= 2010 Wimbledon Championships – Women's doubles qualifying =

Women's doubles qualifying
- 2010 Wimbledon Championships

Events
Singles	men	women		boys	girls
Doubles	men	women	mixed	boys	girls
WC Singles	men	women	quad
WC Doubles	men	women	quad
Legends	men	women	seniors

Qualification
Singles	men	women
Doubles	men	women
- Wimbledon Championships

Players and pairs who neither have high enough rankings nor receive wild cards may participate in a qualifying tournament held one week before the annual Wimbledon Tennis Championships.

== Seeds ==
1. (Ukraine) Mariya Koryttseva / (Belarus) Darya Kustova (qualified)
2. (Greece) Eleni Daniilidou / (Germany) Jasmin Wöhr (qualified)
3. (Croatia) Darija Jurak / (France) Sophie Lefèvre (first round)
4. (France) Stéphanie Cohen-Aloro / (Tunisia) Selima Sfar (first round)
5. (Sweden) Johanna Larsson / (Austria) Yvonne Meusburger (first round)
6. (Russia) Nina Bratchikova / (Russia) Vitalia Diatchenko (qualifying competition)
7. (United States) Jill Craybas / (New Zealand) Marina Erakovic (qualified)
8. (Hungary) Katalin Marosi / (Germany) Kathrin Wörle (qualifying competition, lucky losers)

== Qualifiers ==
1. (Ukraine) Mariya Koryttseva / (Belarus) Darya Kustova
2. (Greece) Eleni Daniilidou / (Germany) Jasmin Wöhr
3. (Estonia) Kaia Kanepi / (China) Zhang Shuai
4. (United States) Jill Craybas / (New Zealand) Marina Erakovic

== Lucky losers ==
1. (Hungary) Katalin Marosi / (Germany) Kathrin Wörle
2. (Chinese Taipei) Chang Kai-chen / (Japan) Ayumi Morita

== Qualifying draw ==
=== First qualifier ===
First round
1	(Ukraine) Mariya Koryttseva (Belarus) Darya Kustova	6	6
(United States) Varvara Lepchenko (France) Aurélie Védy	0	3
(Italy) Maria Elena Camerin (Australia) Jarmila Groth	4	2
6	(Russia) Nina Bratchikova (Russia) Vitalia Diatchenko	6	6

Qualifying competition
1	(Ukraine) Mariya Koryttseva (Belarus) Darya Kustova	6	6
6	(Russia) Nina Bratchikova (Russia) Vitalia Diatchenko	3	3

=== Second qualifier ===
First round
2	(Greece) Eleni Daniilidou (Germany) Jasmin Wöhr	6	6
WC	(United Kingdom) Emily Webley-Smith (United Kingdom) Lisa Whybourn	4	4
(Georgia (country)) Oksana Kalashnikova (Russia) Vesna Manasieva	6	6
5	(Sweden) Johanna Larsson (Austria) Yvonne Meusburger	3	2

Qualifying competition
2	(Greece) Eleni Daniilidou (Germany) Jasmin Wöhr	6	6
(Georgia (country)) Oksana Kalashnikova (Russia) Vesna Manasieva	3	0

=== Third qualifier ===
First round
3	(Croatia) Darija Jurak (France) Sophie Lefèvre	6^{6}	2
(Estonia) Kaia Kanepi (China) Zhang Shuai	7^{8}	6
(Kazakhstan) Sesil Karatantcheva (Bulgaria) Tsvetana Pironkova	6	4	3
8	(Hungary) Katalin Marosi (Germany) Kathrin Wörle	3	6	6

Qualifying competition
(Estonia) Kaia Kanepi (China) Zhang Shuai	7^{8}	6
8	(Hungary) Katalin Marosi (Germany) Kathrin Wörle	6^{6}	4

=== Fourth qualifier ===
First round
4	(France) Stéphanie Cohen-Aloro (Tunisia) Selima Sfar	3	2
(Chinese Taipei) Chang Kai-chen (Japan) Ayumi Morita	6	6
WC	(United Kingdom) Anna Fitzpatrick (United Kingdom) Jade Windley	4	7^{7}	1
7	(United States) Jill Craybas (New Zealand) Marina Erakovic	6	6^{5}	6

Qualifying competition
(Chinese Taipei) Chang Kai-chen (Japan) Ayumi Morita	6	5	1
7	(United States) Jill Craybas (New Zealand) Marina Erakovic	3	7	6
