= 2010 Wimbledon Championships – Men's doubles qualifying =

Men's doubles qualifying
- 2010 Wimbledon Championships

Events
| Singles | men | women | | boys | girls |
| Doubles | men | women | mixed | boys | girls |
| WC Singles | men | women | quad |
| WC Doubles | men | women | quad |
| Legends | men | women | seniors |

Qualification
| Singles | men | women |
| Doubles | men | women |
- Wimbledon Championships

Players and pairs who neither have high enough rankings nor receive wild cards may participate in a qualifying tournament held one week before the annual Wimbledon Tennis Championships.

== Seeds ==
1. (Poland) Tomasz Bednarek / (Poland) Mateusz Kowalczyk (qualifying competition, lucky losers)
2. (Thailand) Sanchai Ratiwatana / (Thailand) Sonchat Ratiwatana (qualifying competition, lucky losers)
3. (United States) David Martin / (Croatia) Lovro Zovko (qualifying competition)
4. (Austria) Martin Fischer / (Austria) Philipp Oswald (first round)
5. (Italy) Alessandro Motti / (Italy) Simone Vagnozzi (first round)
6. (South Africa) Rik de Voest / (Germany) Mischa Zverev (qualified)
7. (Switzerland) Yves Allegro / (India) Prakash Amritraj (first round)
8. (Serbia) Ilija Bozoljac / (India) Harsh Mankad (qualified)

== Qualifiers ==
1. (India) Somdev Devvarman / (Philippines) Treat Huey
2. (South Africa) Rik de Voest / (Germany) Mischa Zverev
3. (United States) Jesse Levine / (United States) Ryan Sweeting
4. (Serbia) Ilija Bozoljac / (India) Harsh Mankad

== Lucky losers ==
1. (Poland) Tomasz Bednarek / (Poland) Mateusz Kowalczyk
2. (Thailand) Sanchai Ratiwatana / (Thailand) Sonchat Ratiwatana

== Qualifying draw ==
=== First qualifier ===
First round
1 | (Poland) Tomasz Bednarek (Poland) Mateusz Kowalczyk | 6 | 6
(Brazil) Marcos Daniel (Germany) Frank Moser | 4 | 2
(India) Somdev Devvarman (Philippines) Treat Huey | 6^{3} | 6 | 6
7 | (Switzerland) Yves Allegro (India) Prakash Amritraj | 7^{7} | 3 | 2

Qualifying competition
1 | (Poland) Tomasz Bednarek (Poland) Mateusz Kowalczyk | 6^{8} | 5
(India) Somdev Devvarman (Philippines) Treat Huey | 7^{10} | 7

=== Second qualifier ===
First round
2 | (Thailand) Sanchai Ratiwatana (Thailand) Sonchat Ratiwatana | 7^{12} | 7^{7}
WC | (United Kingdom) Richard Bloomfield (United Kingdom) Marcus Willis | 6^{10} | 6^{1}
WC | (United Kingdom) Joshua Milton (United Kingdom) Alexander Ward | 3 | 2
6 | (South Africa) Rik de Voest (Germany) Mischa Zverev | 6 | 6

Qualifying competition
2 | (Thailand) Sanchai Ratiwatana (Thailand) Sonchat Ratiwatana | 5 | 2
6 | (South Africa) Rik de Voest (Germany) Mischa Zverev | 7 | 6

=== Third qualifier ===
First round
3 | (United States) David Martin (Croatia) Lovro Zovko | 4 | 6 | 6
(Canada) Frank Dancevic (Canada) Adil Shamasdin | 6 | 4 | 4
(United States) Jesse Levine (United States) Ryan Sweeting | 6 | 6
5 | (Italy) Alessandro Motti (Italy) Simone Vagnozzi | 3 | 4

Qualifying competition
3 | (United States) David Martin (Croatia) Lovro Zovko | 6 | 6^{4} | 8
(United States) Jesse Levine (United States) Ryan Sweeting | 1 | 7^{7} | 10

=== Fourth qualifier ===
First round
4 | (Austria) Martin Fischer (Austria) Philipp Oswald | 2 | 6 | 4
(Austria) Alexander Peya (Germany) Björn Phau | 6 | 4 | 6
(Brazil) Thiago Alves (Brazil) João Souza | 3 | 6^{5}
8 | (Serbia) Ilija Bozoljac (India) Harsh Mankad | 6 | 7^{7}

Qualifying competition
(Austria) Alexander Peya (Germany) Björn Phau | 6^{5} | 4
8 | (Serbia) Ilija Bozoljac (India) Harsh Mankad | 7^{7} | 6
