= 2009 Wimbledon Championships – Men's doubles qualifying =

Men's doubles qualifying
- 2009 Wimbledon Championships

Events
Singles	men	women		boys	girls
Doubles	men	women	mixed	boys	girls
WC Singles	men	women	quad
WC Doubles	men	women	quad
Legends	men	women	seniors

Qualification
Singles	men	women
Doubles	men	women
- Wimbledon Championships

Players and pairs who neither have high enough rankings nor receive wild cards may participate in a qualifying tournament held one week before the annual Wimbledon Tennis Championships.

== Seeds ==
1. (Australia) Rameez Junaid / (Germany) Philipp Marx (qualifying competition, lucky losers)
2. (United States) David Martin / (Switzerland) Jean-Claude Scherrer (qualifying competition, lucky losers)
3. (Russia) Mikhail Elgin / (Russia) Alexander Kudryavtsev (first round)
4. (Thailand) Sanchai Ratiwatana / (Thailand) Sonchat Ratiwatana (qualifying competition, lucky losers)
5. (Mexico) Santiago González / (United States) Travis Rettenmaier (qualified)
6. (Italy) Marco Crugnola / (Spain) David Marrero (first round)
7. (India) Prakash Amritraj / (Pakistan) Aisam-ul-Haq Qureshi (qualified)
8. (Ukraine) Sergei Bubka / (Ukraine) Sergiy Stakhovsky (first round)

== Qualifiers ==
1. (United Kingdom) Chris Eaton / (United Kingdom) Alexander Slabinsky
2. (Mexico) Santiago González / (United States) Travis Rettenmaier
3. (South Africa) Kevin Anderson / (India) Somdev Devvarman
4. (India) Prakash Amritraj / (Pakistan) Aisam-ul-Haq Qureshi

== Lucky losers ==
1. (Australia) Rameez Junaid / (Germany) Philipp Marx
2. (United States) David Martin / (Switzerland) Jean-Claude Scherrer
3. (Italy) Alessandro Motti / (Australia) Joseph Sirianni
4. (Thailand) Sanchai Ratiwatana / (Thailand) Sonchat Ratiwatana
5. (Slovakia) Karol Beck / (Czech Republic) Jaroslav Levinský
6. (Australia) Chris Guccione / (Germany) Frank Moser

== Qualifying draw ==
=== First qualifier ===
First round
1	(Australia) Rameez Junaid (Germany) Philipp Marx	6	6^{5}	7
(Italy) Flavio Cipolla (Israel) Harel Levy	3	7^{7}	5
WC	(United Kingdom) Chris Eaton (United Kingdom) Alexander Slabinsky	6	6
6	(Italy) Marco Crugnola (Spain) David Marrero	4	3

Qualifying competition
1	(Australia) Rameez Junaid (Germany) Philipp Marx	6^{3}	4
WC	(United Kingdom) Chris Eaton (United Kingdom) Alexander Slabinsky	7^{7}	6

=== Second qualifier ===
First round
2	(United States) David Martin (Switzerland) Jean-Claude Scherrer	4	6	6
(Slovakia) Karol Beck (Czech Republic) Jaroslav Levinský	6	3	2
WC	(United Kingdom) Daniel Smethurst (United Kingdom) Marcus Willis	5	3
5	(Mexico) Santiago González (United States) Travis Rettenmaier	7	6

Qualifying competition
2	(United States) David Martin (Switzerland) Jean-Claude Scherrer	6^{2}	4
5	(Mexico) Santiago González (United States) Travis Rettenmaier	7^{7}	6

=== Third qualifier ===
First round
3	(Russia) Mikhail Elgin (Russia) Alexander Kudryavtsev	1	6^{6}
(Italy) Alessandro Motti (Australia) Joseph Sirianni	6	7^{8}
(South Africa) Kevin Anderson (India) Somdev Devvarman	6	2	6
8	(Ukraine) Sergei Bubka (Ukraine) Sergiy Stakhovsky	2	6	4

Qualifying competition
(Italy) Alessandro Motti (Australia) Joseph Sirianni	6^{0}	7^{7}	6
(South Africa) Kevin Anderson (India) Somdev Devvarman	7^{7}	6^{1}	8

=== Fourth qualifier ===
First round
4	(Thailand) Sanchai Ratiwatana (Thailand) Sonchat Ratiwatana	7^{7}	6
(Brazil) Thiago Alves (Argentina) Horacio Zeballos	6^{3}	3
(Australia) Chris Guccione (Germany) Frank Moser	5	7	1
7	(India) Prakash Amritraj (Pakistan) Aisam-ul-Haq Qureshi	7	5	6

Qualifying competition
4	(Thailand) Sanchai Ratiwatana (Thailand) Sonchat Ratiwatana	6^{5}	4
7	(India) Prakash Amritraj (Pakistan) Aisam-ul-Haq Qureshi	7^{7}	6
