= 2009 Wimbledon Championships – Women's doubles qualifying =

Women's doubles qualifying
- 2009 Wimbledon Championships

Events
Singles	men	women		boys	girls
Doubles	men	women	mixed	boys	girls
WC Singles	men	women	quad
WC Doubles	men	women	quad
Legends	men	women	seniors

Qualification
Singles	men	women
Doubles	men	women
- Wimbledon Championships

Players and pairs who neither have high enough rankings nor receive wild cards may participate in a qualifying tournament held one week before the annual Wimbledon Tennis Championships.

== Seeds ==
1. (Slovenia) Andreja Klepač / (Belarus) Darya Kustova (first round)
2. (France) Camille Pin / (Tunisia) Selima Sfar (first round)
3. (Chinese Taipei) Chan Chin-wei / (United States) Angela Haynes (qualifying competition)
4. (Ukraine) Yuliana Fedak / (Bosnia and Herzegovina) Mervana Jugić-Salkić (qualified)
5. (Japan) Rika Fujiwara / (Japan) Aiko Nakamura (qualified)
6. (Romania) Edina Gallovits / (Hungary) Katalin Marosi (qualified)
7. (France) Mathilde Johansson / (Romania) Raluca Olaru (first round)
8. (Poland) Marta Domachowska / (United States) Lilia Osterloh (first round)

== Qualifiers ==
1. (Germany) Tatjana Malek / (Germany) Andrea Petkovic
2. (Japan) Rika Fujiwara / (Japan) Aiko Nakamura
3. (Romania) Edina Gallovits / (Hungary) Katalin Marosi
4. (Ukraine) Yuliana Fedak / (Bosnia and Herzegovina) Mervana Jugić-Salkić

== Qualifying draw ==
=== First qualifier ===
First round
1	(Slovenia) Andreja Klepač (Belarus) Darya Kustova	3	6	5
(Germany) Tatjana Malek (Germany) Andrea Petkovic	6	2	7
(United States) Varvara Lepchenko (Russia) Evgeniya Rodina	6	7
8	(Poland) Marta Domachowska (United States) Lilia Osterloh	2	5

Qualifying competition
(Germany) Tatjana Malek (Germany) Andrea Petkovic	6	7
(United States) Varvara Lepchenko (Russia) Evgeniya Rodina	4	5

=== Second qualifier ===
First round
2	(France) Camille Pin (Tunisia) Selima Sfar	3	7	3
(United States) Melanie Oudin (Netherlands) Arantxa Rus	6	5	6
WC	(United Kingdom) Naomi Broady (United Kingdom) Elizabeth Thomas	5	3
5	(Japan) Rika Fujiwara (Japan) Aiko Nakamura	7	6

Qualifying competition
(United States) Melanie Oudin (Netherlands) Arantxa Rus	4	3
5	(Japan) Rika Fujiwara (Japan) Aiko Nakamura	6	6

=== Third qualifier ===
First round
3	(Chinese Taipei) Chan Chin-wei (United States) Angela Haynes	6	7
WC	(United Kingdom) Anna Fitzpatrick (United Kingdom) Emily Webley-Smith	2	5
(Canada) Stéphanie Dubois (Switzerland) Stefanie Vögele	3	3
6	(Romania) Edina Gallovits (Hungary) Katalin Marosi	6	6

Qualifying competition
3	(Chinese Taipei) Chan Chin-wei (United States) Angela Haynes	6	2	3
6	(Romania) Edina Gallovits (Hungary) Katalin Marosi	1	6	6

=== Fourth qualifier ===
First round
4	(Ukraine) Yuliana Fedak (Bosnia and Herzegovina) Mervana Jugić-Salkić	6	6
(Italy) Alberta Brianti (Slovenia) Maša Zec Peškirič	1	4
(Kazakhstan) Sesil Karatantcheva (Bulgaria) Tsvetana Pironkova	6	6
7	(France) Mathilde Johansson (Romania) Raluca Olaru	3	4

Qualifying competition
4	(Ukraine) Yuliana Fedak (Bosnia and Herzegovina) Mervana Jugić-Salkić	6	6
(Kazakhstan) Sesil Karatantcheva (Bulgaria) Tsvetana Pironkova	2	3
