= 2010 Wimbledon Championships – Day-by-day summaries =

The 2010 Wimbledon Championships are described below in detail, in the form of day-by-day summaries.

== Day 1 (21 June) ==
- Seeds out:
  - Gentlemen's Singles: (Croatia) Marin Čilić [11], (Croatia) Ivan Ljubičić [17], (Switzerland) Stan Wawrinka [20], (Spain) Tommy Robredo [30]
  - Ladies' Singles: (Italy) Francesca Schiavone [5], (Ukraine) Kateryna Bondarenko [34]
- Schedule of play

Matches on main courts
Matches on Centre Court
Event	Winner	Loser	Score
Gentlemen's Singles 1st Round	(Switzerland) Roger Federer [1]	(Colombia) Alejandro Falla	5–7, 4–6, 6–4, 7–6^{(7–1)}, 6–0
Ladies' Singles 1st Round	(Serbia) Jelena Janković [4]	(United Kingdom) Laura Robson [WC]	6–3, 7–6^{(7–5)}
Gentlemen's Singles 1st Round	(Serbia) Novak Djokovic [3]	(Belgium) Olivier Rochus	4–6, 6–2, 3–6, 6–4, 6–2
Matches on No. 1 Court
Event	Winner	Loser	Score
Gentlemen's Singles 1st Round	(Russia) Nikolay Davydenko [7]	(South Africa) Kevin Anderson	3–6, 6–7^{(3–7)}, 7–6^{(7–3)}, 7–5, 9–7
Gentlemen's Singles 1st Round	(United States) Andy Roddick [5]	(United States) Rajeev Ram	6–3, 6–2, 6–2
Ladies' Singles 1st Round	(United States) Venus Williams [2]	(Paraguay) Rossana de los Ríos	6–3, 6–2
Matches on No. 2 Court
Event	Winner	Loser	Score
Ladies' Singles 1st Round	(Belgium) Kim Clijsters [8]	(Italy) Maria Elena Camerin	6–0, 6–3
Gentlemen's Singles 1st Round	(United States) Mardy Fish	(Australia) Bernard Tomic [Q]	6–3, 7–6^{(10–8)}, 6–2
Ladies' Singles 1st Round	(Russia) Vera Dushevina	(Italy) Francesca Schiavone [5]	6–7^{(0–7)}, 7–5, 6–1
Gentlemen's Singles 1st Round	(Australia) Lleyton Hewitt [15]	(Argentina) Máximo González	5–7, 6–0, 6–2, 6–2

== Day 2 (22 June) ==
- Seeds out:
  - Gentlemen's Singles: (Spain) Fernando Verdasco [8], (Spain) Juan Carlos Ferrero [14], (Spain) Nicolás Almagro [19], (Cyprus) Marcos Baghdatis [24]
  - Ladies' Singles: (Australia) Samantha Stosur [6], (Czech Republic) Lucie Šafářová [25]

Schedule of play

Matches on main courts
Matches on Centre Court
Event	Winner	Loser	Score
Ladies' Singles 1st Round	(United States) Serena Williams [1]	(Portugal) Michelle Larcher de Brito	6–0, 6–4
Gentlemen's Singles 1st Round	(Spain) Rafael Nadal [2]	(Japan) Kei Nishikori [WC]	6–2, 6–4, 6–4
Gentlemen's Singles 1st Round	(Sweden) Robin Söderling [6]	(United States) Robby Ginepri	6–2, 6–2, 6–3
Ladies' Singles 1st Round	(Belarus) Victoria Azarenka [14]	(Croatia) Mirjana Lučić [Q]	6–3, 6–3
Matches on No. 1 Court
Event	Winner	Loser	Score
Gentlemen's Singles 1st Round	(France) Jo-Wilfried Tsonga [10]	(United States) Robert Kendrick [Q]	7–6^{(7–2)}, 7–6^{(8–6)}, 3–6, 6–4
Gentlemen's Singles 1st Round	(United Kingdom) Andy Murray [4]	(Czech Republic) Jan Hájek	7–5, 6–1, 6–2
Ladies' Singles 1st Round	(Denmark) Caroline Wozniacki [3]	(Italy) Tathiana Garbin	6–1, 6–1
Ladies' Singles 1st Round	(Slovakia) Daniela Hantuchová [24] vs (United States) Vania King		6–7^{(4–7)}, 7–6^{(7–4)}, suspended
Matches on No. 2 Court
Event	Winner	Loser	Score
Ladies' Singles 1st Round	(Russia) Svetlana Kuznetsova [19]	(Uzbekistan) Akgul Amanmuradova	6–2, 6–7^{(5–7)}, 6–4
Gentlemen's Singles 1st Round	(Spain) David Ferrer [9]	(Germany) Nicolas Kiefer [WC]	6–4, 6–2, 6–3
Ladies' Singles 1st Round	(Russia) Maria Sharapova [16]	(Russia) Anastasia Pivovarova [LL]	6–1, 6–0
Gentlemen's Singles 1st Round	(Belgium) Xavier Malisse	(Spain) Juan Carlos Ferrero [14]	6–2, 6–7^{(6–8)}, 7–6^{(7–5)}, 4–6, 6–1
Notable Matches on Other Courts
Matches on Court 18
Event	Winner	Loser	Score
Gentlemen's Singles 1st Round	(France) Nicolas Mahut [Q] vs (United States) John Isner [23]		4–6, 6–3, 7–6^{(9–7)}, 6–7^{(3–7)}, suspended

== Day 3 (23 June) ==
- Seeds out:
  - Gentlemen's Singles: (Russia) Nikolay Davydenko [7]
  - Ladies' Singles: (Israel) Shahar Pe'er [13], (Kazakhstan) Yaroslava Shvedova [30], (United States) Melanie Oudin [33]
  - Gentlemen's Doubles: (Poland) Łukasz Kubot / (Austria) Oliver Marach [5]

Schedule of play

Matches on main courts
Matches on Centre Court
Event	Winner	Loser	Score
Gentlemen's Singles 2nd Round	(United States) Andy Roddick [5]	(France) Michaël Llodra	4–6, 6–4, 6–1, 7–6^{(7–2)}
Ladies' Singles 2nd Round	(United States) Venus Williams [2]	(Russia) Ekaterina Makarova	6–0, 6–4
Gentlemen's Singles 2nd Round	(Serbia) Novak Djokovic [3]	(United States) Taylor Dent	7–6^{(7–5)}, 6–1, 6–4
Ladies' Doubles 1st Round	(United Kingdom) Sarah Borwell / (United States) Raquel Kops-Jones vs (United States) Liezel Huber [5] / (United States) Bethanie Mattek-Sands [5]		7–6^{(7–1)}, 3–6, suspended
Matches on No. 1 Court
Event	Winner	Loser	Score
Ladies' Singles 2nd Round	(Belgium) Kim Clijsters [8]	(Croatia) Karolina Šprem	6–3, 6–2
Gentlemen's Singles 2nd Round	(Australia) Lleyton Hewitt [15]	(Kazakhstan) Evgeny Korolev	6–4, 6–4, 3–0 ret
Gentlemen's Singles 2nd Round	(Switzerland) Roger Federer [1]	(Serbia) Ilija Bozoljac	6–3, 6–7^{(4–7)}, 6–4, 7–6^{(7–5)}
Ladies' Doubles 1st Round	(Germany) Julia Görges (Hungary) Ágnes Szávay	(United Kingdom) Naomi Cavaday [WC] (United Kingdom) Anna Smith [WC]	4–6, 6–4, 6–1
Matches on No. 2 Court
Event	Winner	Loser	Score
Ladies' Singles 2nd Round	(Belgium) Justine Henin [17]	(Germany) Kristina Barrois	6–3, 7–5
Gentlemen's Singles 2nd Round	(France) Gaël Monfils [21]	(Slovakia) Karol Beck	6–4, 6–4, 6–7^{(4–7)}, 6–4
Gentlemen's Singles 2nd Round	(Czech Republic) Tomáš Berdych [12]	(Germany) Benjamin Becker	7–5, 6–3, 6–4
Ladies' Singles 2nd Round	(Serbia) Jelena Janković [4]	(Canada) Aleksandra Wozniak	4–6, 6–2, 6–4
Notable Matches on Other Courts
Matches on Court 18
Event	Winner	Loser	Score
Gentlemen's Singles 1st Round	(France) Nicolas Mahut [Q] vs (United States) John Isner [23]		4–6, 6–3, 7–6^{(9–7)}, 6–7^{(3–7)}, 59–59, suspended

== Day 4 (24 June) ==
- Seeds out:
  - Ladies' Singles: (France) Aravane Rezaï [18], (Russia) Svetlana Kuznetsova [19], (China) Zheng Jie [23], (Slovakia) Daniela Hantuchová [24]
  - Gentlemen's Doubles: (United States) Mardy Fish / (The Bahamas) Mark Knowles [13]
  - Ladies' Doubles: (Chinese Taipei) Chan Yung-jan / (China) Zheng Jie [9]

Schedule of play

Matches on main courts
Matches on Centre Court
Event	Winner	Loser	Score
Gentlemen's Singles 2nd Round	(United Kingdom) Andy Murray [4]	(Finland) Jarkko Nieminen	6–4, 6–3, 6–2
Ladies' Singles 2nd Round	(Denmark) Caroline Wozniacki [3]	(Chinese Taipei) Chang Kai-chen	6–4, 6–3
Gentlemen's Singles 2nd Round	(Spain) Rafael Nadal [2]	(Netherlands) Robin Haase	5–7, 6–2, 3–6, 6–0, 6–3
Ladies' Doubles 1st Round	(United Kingdom) Elena Baltacha (Ukraine) Olga Savchuk	(Russia) Regina Kulikova (Latvia) Anastasija Sevastova	6–3, 6–3
Matches on No. 1 Court
Event	Winner	Loser	Score
Ladies' Singles 2nd Round	(Russia) Maria Sharapova [16]	(Romania) Raluca Olaru	6–1, 6–4
Gentlemen's Singles 2nd Round	(Sweden) Robin Söderling [6]	(Spain) Marcel Granollers	7–5, 6–1, 6–4
Gentlemen's Singles 2nd Round	(United States) Sam Querrey [18]	(Croatia) Ivan Dodig [Q]	6–2, 5–7, 6–3, 7–6^{(12–10)}
Ladies' Doubles 1st Round	(Estonia) Kaia Kanepi [Q] (China) Zhang Shuai [Q]	(Australia) Sally Peers [WC] (United Kingdom) Laura Robson [WC]	6–2, 6–4
Matches on No. 2 Court
Event	Winner	Loser	Score
Gentlemen's Singles 2nd Round	(France) Jo-Wilfried Tsonga [10]	(Ukraine) Alexandr Dolgopolov	6–4, 6–4, 6–7^{(5–7)}, 5–7, 10–8
Gentlemen's Singles 2nd Round	(Spain) David Ferrer [9]	(France) Florent Serra	6–4, 7–5, 6–7^{(6–8)}, 6–3
Ladies' Singles 2nd Round	(United States) Serena Williams [1]	(Russia) Anna Chakvetadze	6–0, 6–1
Notable Matches on Other Courts
Matches on Court 18
Event	Winner	Loser	Score
Gentlemen's Singles 1st Round	(United States) John Isner [23]	(France) Nicolas Mahut [Q]	6–4, 3–6, 6–7^{(7–9)}, 7–6^{(7–3)}, 70–68

== Day 5 (25 June) ==
- Seeds out:
  - Gentlemen's Singles: (Russia) Mikhail Youzhny [13], (France) Gaël Monfils [21], (Spain) Feliciano López [22], (United States) John Isner [23], (Spain) Albert Montañés [28], (Germany) Philipp Kohlschreiber [29], (Romania) Victor Hănescu [31]
  - Ladies' Singles: (Russia) Nadia Petrova [12], (Belgium) Yanina Wickmayer [15], (Russia) Alisa Kleybanova [26], (Russia) Maria Kirilenko [27], (Ukraine) Alona Bondarenko [28]
  - Gentlemen's Doubles: (Czech Republic) Lukáš Dlouhý / (India) Leander Paes [3], (Czech Republic) František Čermák / (Slovakia) Michal Mertiňák [9]
  - Ladies' Doubles: (Russia) Maria Kirilenko / (Poland) Agnieszka Radwańska [10], (Poland) Alicja Rosolska / (China) Yan Zi [15]

Schedule of play

Matches on main courts
Matches on Centre Court
Event	Winner	Loser	Score
Ladies' Singles 3rd Round	(Belgium) Justine Henin [17]	(Russia) Nadia Petrova [12]	6–1, 6–4
Gentlemen's Singles 3rd Round	(Australia) Lleyton Hewitt [15]	(France) Gaël Monfils [21]	6–3, 7–6^{(11–9)}, 6–4
Gentlemen's Singles 3rd Round	(Switzerland) Roger Federer [1]	(France) Arnaud Clément	6–2, 6–4, 6–2
Mixed Doubles 1st Round	(Brazil) André Sá (Russia) Vera Zvonareva	(United Kingdom) Jamie Murray [WC] (United Kingdom) Laura Robson [WC]	6–3, 6–3
Matches on No. 1 Court
Event	Winner	Loser	Score
Gentlemen's Singles 3rd Round	(Serbia) Novak Djokovic [3]	(Spain) Albert Montañés [28]	6–1, 6–4, 6–4
Ladies' Singles 3rd Round	(United States) Venus Williams [2]	(Russia) Alisa Kleybanova [26]	6–4, 6–2
Gentlemen's Singles 3rd Round	(United States) Andy Roddick [5]	(Germany) Philipp Kohlschreiber [29]	7–5, 6–7^{(5–7)}, 6–3, 6–3
Matches on No. 2 Court
Event	Winner	Loser	Score
Ladies' Singles 3rd Round	(Belgium) Kim Clijsters [8]	(Russia) Maria Kirilenko [27]	6–3, 6–3
Ladies' Singles 3rd Round	(Serbia) Jelena Janković [4]	(Ukraine) Alona Bondarenko [28]	6–0, 6–3
Gentlemen's Singles 3rd Round	(Austria) Jürgen Melzer [16]	(Spain) Feliciano López [22]	4–6, 6–3, 6–2, 6–4
Ladies' Doubles 2nd Round	(United States) Serena Williams [1] (United States) Venus Williams [1]	(Switzerland) Timea Bacsinszky (Italy) Tathiana Garbin	6–1, 7–6^{(7–2)}

== Day 6 (26 June) ==
- Seeds out:
  - Gentlemen's Singles: (Brazil) Thomaz Bellucci [25], (France) Gilles Simon [26], (Germany) Philipp Petzschner [33]
  - Ladies' Singles: (Italy) Flavia Pennetta [10], (Belarus) Victoria Azarenka [14], (Russia) Anastasia Pavlyuchenkova [29], (Romania) Alexandra Dulgheru [31], (Italy) Sara Errani [32]
  - Gentlemen's Doubles: (Canada) Daniel Nestor / (Serbia) Nenad Zimonjić [1], (Poland) Mariusz Fyrstenberg / (Poland) Marcin Matkowski [6], (Brazil) Marcelo Melo / (Brazil) Bruno Soares [15]
  - Ladies' Doubles: (Russia) Vera Dushevina / (Russia) Ekaterina Makarova [13], (Romania) Monica Niculescu / (Israel) Shahar Pe'er [14], (Chinese Taipei) Chuang Chia-jung / (Belarus) Olga Govortsova [17]
  - Mixed Doubles: (India) Mahesh Bhupathi / (United States) Liezel Huber [3], (Austria) Oliver Marach / (Spain) Nuria Llagostera Vives [4], (Sweden) Robert Lindstedt / (Russia) Ekaterina Makarova [13]

Schedule of play

Matches on main courts
Matches on Centre Court
Event	Winner	Loser	Score
Ladies' Singles 3rd Round	(United States) Serena Williams [1]	(Slovakia) Dominika Cibulková	6–0, 7–5
Gentlemen's Singles 3rd Round	(Spain) Rafael Nadal [2]	(Germany) Philipp Petzschner [33]	6–4, 4–6, 6–7^{(5–7)}, 6–2, 6–3
Gentlemen's Singles 3rd Round	(United Kingdom) Andy Murray [4]	(France) Gilles Simon [26]	6–1, 6–4, 6–4
Matches on No. 1 Court
Event	Winner	Loser	Score
Gentlemen's Singles 3rd Round	(Sweden) Robin Söderling [6]	(Brazil) Thomaz Bellucci [25]	6–4, 6–2, 7–5
Ladies' Singles 3rd Round	(Russia) Maria Sharapova [16]	(Czech Republic) Barbora Záhlavová-Strýcová	7–5, 6–3
Gentlemen's Singles 3rd Round	(United States) Sam Querrey [18]	(Belgium) Xavier Malisse	6–7^{(4–7)}, 6–4, 6–2, 5–7, 9–7
Matches on No. 2 Court
Event	Winner	Loser	Score
Ladies' Singles 3rd Round	(Poland) Agnieszka Radwańska [7]	(Italy) Sara Errani [32]	6–3, 6–1
Ladies' Singles 3rd Round	(Denmark) Caroline Wozniacki [3]	(Russia) Anastasia Pavlyuchenkova [29]	7–5, 6–4
Gentlemen's Singles 3rd Round	(France) Jo-Wilfried Tsonga [10]	(Germany) Tobias Kamke [Q]	6–1, 6–4, 7–6^{(7–1)}
Ladies' Doubles 3rd Round	(United States) Serena Williams [1] (United States) Venus Williams [1]	(Slovakia) Dominika Cibulková (Russia) Anastasia Pavlyuchenkova	6–1, 6–2

== Middle Sunday (27 June) ==
Middle Sunday in Wimbledon is traditionally a rest day, without any play, and this was the case in 2010.

== Day 7 (28 June) ==
- Seeds out:
  - Gentlemen's Singles: (United States) Andy Roddick [5], (Spain) David Ferrer [9], (Australia) Lleyton Hewitt [15], (Austria) Jürgen Melzer [16], (United States) Sam Querrey [18], (France) Julien Benneteau [32]
  - Ladies' Singles: (Denmark) Caroline Wozniacki [3], (Serbia) Jelena Janković [4], (Poland) Agnieszka Radwańska [7], (France) Marion Bartoli [11], (Russia) Maria Sharapova [16], (Belgium) Justine Henin [17],
  - Gentlemen's Doubles: (India) Mahesh Bhupathi / (Belarus) Max Mirnyi [4], (Austria) Julian Knowle / (Israel) Andy Ram [8], (Sweden) Simon Aspelin / (Australia) Paul Hanley [10]
  - Ladies' Doubles: (Russia) Nadia Petrova / (Australia) Samantha Stosur [3], (Zimbabwe) Cara Black / (Slovakia) Daniela Hantuchová [11], (Chinese Taipei) Hsieh Su-wei / (Russia) Alla Kudryavtseva [16]
  - Mixed Doubles: (Israel) Andy Ram / (Russia) Elena Vesnina [15], (Poland) Marcin Matkowski / (Italy) Tathiana Garbin [16]

Schedule of play

Matches on main courts
Matches on Centre Court
Event	Winner	Loser	Score
Gentlemen's Singles 4th Round	(Switzerland) Roger Federer [1]	(Austria) Jürgen Melzer [16]	6–3, 6–2, 6–3
Ladies' Singles 4th Round	(United States) Serena Williams [1]	(Russia) Maria Sharapova [16]	7–6^{(11–9)}, 6–4
Gentlemen's Singles 4th Round	(United Kingdom) Andy Murray [4]	(United States) Sam Querrey [18]	7–5, 6–3, 6–4
Mixed Doubles 2nd Round	(Serbia) Nenad Zimonjić [1] (Australia) Samantha Stosur [1]	(United Kingdom) Colin Fleming [WC] (United Kingdom) Sarah Borwell [WC]	6–1, 6–4
Matches on No. 1 Court
Event	Winner	Loser	Score
Ladies' Singles 4th Round	(Belgium) Kim Clijsters [8]	(Belgium) Justine Henin [17]	2–6, 6–2, 6–3
Gentlemen's Singles 4th Round	(Serbia) Novak Djokovic [3]	(Australia) Lleyton Hewitt [15]	7–5, 6–4, 3–6, 6–4
Gentlemen's Singles 4th Round	(Spain) Rafael Nadal [2]	(France) Paul-Henri Mathieu	6–4, 6–2, 6–2
Matches on No. 2 Court
Event	Winner	Loser	Score
Ladies' Singles 4th Round	(United States) Venus Williams [2]	(Australia) Jarmila Groth	6–4, 7–6^{(7–5)}
Ladies' Singles 4th Round	(Czech Republic) Petra Kvitová	(Denmark) Caroline Wozniacki [3]	6–2, 6–0
Gentlemen's Singles 4th Round	(Chinese Taipei) Lu Yen-hsun	(United States) Andy Roddick [5]	4–6, 7–6^{(7–3)}, 7–6^{(7–4)}, 6–7^{(5–7)}, 9–7
Mixed Doubles 2nd Round	(United Kingdom) Jonathan Marray (United Kingdom) Anna Smith	(Poland) Marcin Matkowski [16] (Italy) Tathiana Garbin [16]	7–6^{(8–6)}, 6–7^{(3–7)}, 6–4

== Day 8 (29 June) ==
- Seeds out:
  - Ladies' Singles: (United States) Venus Williams [2], (Belgium) Kim Clijsters [8], (China) Li Na [9]
  - Gentlemen's Doubles: (Spain) Marcel Granollers / (Spain) Tommy Robredo [11], (France) Julien Benneteau / (France) Michaël Llodra [14]
  - Ladies' Doubles: (Czech Republic) Iveta Benešová / (Czech Republic) Barbora Záhlavová-Strýcová [12]
  - Mixed Doubles: (Canada) Daniel Nestor / (United States) Bethanie Mattek-Sands [6], (Belarus) Max Mirnyi / (Russia) Alisa Kleybanova [8]

Schedule of play

Matches on main courts
Matches on Centre Court
Event	Winner	Loser	Score
Ladies' Singles Quarterfinals	(Russia) Vera Zvonareva [21]	(Belgium) Kim Clijsters [8]	3–6, 6–4, 6–2
Ladies' Singles Quarterfinals	(United States) Serena Williams [1]	(China) Li Na [9]	7–5, 6–3
Gentlemen's Doubles 3rd Round	(United States) Bob Bryan [2] (United States) Mike Bryan [2]	(Australia) Carsten Ball (Australia) Chris Guccione	6–4, 6–4, 7–6^{(7–5)}
Ladies' Invitation Doubles Round Robin	(United States) Martina Navratilova (Czech Republic) Jana Novotná	(Spain) Conchita Martínez (France) Nathalie Tauziat	7–5, 6–1
Matches on No. 1 Court
Event	Winner	Loser	Score
Ladies' Singles Quarterfinals	(Bulgaria) Tsvetana Pironkova	(United States) Venus Williams [2]	6–2, 6–3
Ladies' Singles Quarterfinals	(Czech Republic) Petra Kvitová	(Estonia) Kaia Kanepi [Q]	4–6, 7–6^{(10–8)}, 8–6
Gentlemen's Doubles Quarterfinals	(Sweden) Robert Lindstedt [16] (Romania) Horia Tecău [16]	(Spain) Marcel Granollers [11] (Spain) Tommy Robredo [11]	7–6^{(7–5)}, 6–2, 2–6, 6–4

== Day 9 (30 June) ==
- Seeds out:
  - Gentlemen's Singles: (Switzerland) Roger Federer [1], (Sweden) Robin Söderling [6], (France) Jo-Wilfried Tsonga [10]
  - Gentlemen's Doubles: (United States) Bob Bryan / (United States) Mike Bryan [2]
  - Ladies' Doubles: (United States) Serena Williams / (United States) Venus Williams [1], (Czech Republic) Květa Peschke / (Slovenia) Katarina Srebotnik [6], (United States) Lisa Raymond / (Australia) Rennae Stubbs [7]
  - Mixed Doubles: (Serbia) Nenad Zimonjić / (Australia) Samantha Stosur [1], (The Bahamas) Mark Knowles / (Slovenia) Katarina Srebotnik [5], (Poland) Mariusz Fyrstenberg / (China) Yan Zi [8]

Schedule of play

Matches on main courts
Matches on Centre Court
Event	Winner	Loser	Score
Gentlemen's Singles Quarterfinals	(Czech Republic) Tomáš Berdych [12]	(Switzerland) Roger Federer [1]	6–4, 3–6, 6–1, 6–4
Gentlemen's Singles Quarterfinals	(United Kingdom) Andy Murray [4]	(France) Jo-Wilfried Tsonga [10]	6–7^{(5–7)}, 7–6^{(7–5)}, 6–2, 6–2
Ladies' Doubles Quarterfinals	(United States) Liezel Huber [5] (United States) Bethanie Mattek-Sands [5]	(United States) Lisa Raymond [7] (Australia) Rennae Stubbs [7]	6–4, 6–3
Matches on No. 1 Court
Event	Winner	Loser	Score
Gentlemen's Singles Quarterfinals	(Serbia) Novak Djokovic [3]	(Chinese Taipei) Lu Yen-hsun	6–3, 6–2, 6–2
Gentlemen's Singles Quarterfinals	(Spain) Rafael Nadal [2]	(Sweden) Robin Söderling [6]	3–6, 6–3, 7–6^{(7–4)}, 6–1
Ladies' Doubles Quarterfinals	(Argentina) Gisela Dulko [4] (Italy) Flavia Pennetta [4]	(Germany) Julia Görges (Hungary) Ágnes Szávay	6–2, 6–2

== Day 10 (1 July) ==
- Seeds out:
  - Gentlemen's Doubles: (South Africa) Wesley Moodie / (Belgium) Dick Norman [7]
  - Mixed Doubles: (Australia) Paul Hanley / (Chinese Taipei) Chan Yung-jan [12]

Schedule of play

Matches on main courts
Matches on Centre Court
Event	Winner	Loser	Score
Ladies' Singles Semifinals	(Russia) Vera Zvonareva [21]	(Bulgaria) Tsvetana Pironkova	3–6, 6–3, 6–2
Ladies' Singles Semifinals	(United States) Serena Williams [1]	(Czech Republic) Petra Kvitová	7–6^{(7–5)}, 6–2
Gentlemen's Doubles Semifinals	(Sweden) Robert Lindstedt [16] (Romania) Horia Tecău [16]	(Argentina) Juan Ignacio Chela (Argentina) Eduardo Schwank	6–4, 7–5, 6–2
Ladies' Invitation Doubles Round Robin	(Switzerland) Martina Hingis (Russia) Anna Kournikova	(Czech Republic) Helena Suková (Hungary) Andrea Temesvári	6–1, 6–4
Matches on No. 1 Court
Event	Winner	Loser	Score
Gentlemen's Doubles Semifinals	(Austria) Jürgen Melzer (Germany) Philipp Petzschner	(South Africa) Wesley Moodie [7] (Belgium) Dick Norman [7]	7–6^{(7–3)}, 6–3, 3–6, 5–7, 6–3
Mixed Doubles Quarterfinals	(Brazil) Marcelo Melo [10] (Australia) Rennae Stubbs [10]	(Belgium) Xavier Malisse (Belgium) Kim Clijsters	7–6^{(7–3)}, 7–6^{(7–3)}
Mixed Doubles Quarterfinals	(South Africa) Wesley Moodie [11] (United States) Lisa Raymond [11]	(Austria) Julian Knowle (Kazakhstan) Yaroslava Shvedova	7–6^{(10–8)}, 3–6, 6–2

== Day 11 (2 July) ==
- Seeds out:
  - Gentlemen's Singles: (Serbia) Novak Djokovic [3], (United Kingdom) Andy Murray [4]
  - Ladies' Doubles: (Argentina) Gisela Dulko / (Italy) Flavia Pennetta [4], (United States) Liezel Huber / (United States) Bethanie Mattek-Sands [5]
  - Mixed Doubles: (Czech Republic) Lukáš Dlouhý / (Czech Republic) Iveta Benešová [9], (Brazil) Marcelo Melo / (Australia) Rennae Stubbs [10]

Schedule of play

Matches on main courts
Matches on Centre Court
Event	Winner	Loser	Score
Gentlemen's Singles Semifinals	(Czech Republic) Tomáš Berdych [12]	(Serbia) Novak Djokovic [3]	6–3, 7–6^{(11–9)}, 6–3
Gentlemen's Singles Semifinals	(Spain) Rafael Nadal [2]	(United Kingdom) Andy Murray [4]	6–4, 7–6^{(7–6)}, 6–4
Ladies' Invitation Doubles Round Robin	(United States) Martina Navratilova (Czech Republic) Jana Novotná	(South Africa) Ilana Kloss (United States) Rosalyn Nideffer	6–3, 6–1
Matches on No. 1 Court
Event	Winner	Loser	Score
Ladies' Doubles Semifinals	(Russia) Elena Vesnina (Russia) Vera Zvonareva	(Argentina) Gisela Dulko [4] (Italy) Flavia Pennetta [4]	6–3, 6–1
Ladies' Doubles Semifinals	(United States) Vania King (Kazakhstan) Yaroslava Shvedova	(United States) Liezel Huber [5] (United States) Bethanie Mattek-Sands [5]	6–4, 6–4
Mixed Doubles Semifinals	(India) Leander Paes [2] (Zimbabwe) Cara Black [2]	(Czech Republic) Lukáš Dlouhý [9] (Czech Republic) Iveta Benešová [9]	6–3, 6–3
Mixed Doubles Semifinals	(South Africa) Wesley Moodie [11] (United States) Lisa Raymond [11]	(Brazil) Marcelo Melo [10] (Australia) Rennae Stubbs [10]	6–4, 6–4

== Day 12 (3 July) ==
- Seeds out:
  - Ladies' Singles: (Russia) Vera Zvonareva [21]
  - Gentlemen's Doubles: (Sweden) Robert Lindstedt / (Romania) Horia Tecău [16]

Schedule of play

Matches on main courts
Matches on Centre Court
Event	Winner	Loser	Score
Ladies' Singles Final	(United States) Serena Williams [1]	(Russia) Vera Zvonareva [21]	6–3, 6–2
Gentlemen's Doubles Final	(Austria) Jürgen Melzer (Germany) Philipp Petzschner	(Sweden) Robert Lindstedt [16] (Romania) Horia Tecău [16]	6–1, 7–5, 7–5
Ladies' Doubles Final	(United States) Vania King (Kazakhstan) Yaroslava Shvedova	(Russia) Elena Vesnina (Russia) Vera Zvonareva	7–6^{(7–6)}, 6–2
Matches on No. 1 Court
Event	Winner	Loser	Score
Girls' Singles Final	(Czech Republic) Kristýna Plíšková [9]	(Japan) Sachie Ishizu [10]	6–3, 4–6, 6–4
Gentlemen's Invitation Doubles Round Robin	(United States) Donald Johnson (United States) Jared Palmer	(United Kingdom) Mark Petchey (United Kingdom) Chris Wilkinson	6–3, 7–6^{(7–3)}
Gentlemen's Invitation Doubles Round Robin	(United States) Justin Gimelstob (United States) Todd Martin	(South Africa) Wayne Ferreira (Russia) Yevgeny Kafelnikov	6–4, 7–5

== Day 13 (4 July) ==
- Seeds out:
  - Gentlemen's Singles: (Czech Republic) Tomáš Berdych [12]
  - Mixed Doubles: (South Africa) Wesley Moodie / (United States) Lisa Raymond [11]

Schedule of play

Matches on main courts
Matches on Centre Court
Event	Winner	Loser	Score
Gentlemen's Singles Final	(Spain) Rafael Nadal [2]	(Czech Republic) Tomáš Berdych [12]	6–3, 7–5, 6–4
Mixed Doubles Final	(India) Leander Paes [2] (Zimbabwe) Cara Black [2]	(South Africa) Wesley Moodie [11] (United States) Lisa Raymond [11]	6–4, 7–6^{(7–5)}
Matches on No. 1 Court
Event	Winner	Loser	Score
Boys' Singles Final	(Hungary) Márton Fucsovics [13]	(Australia) Benjamin Mitchell [Q]	6–4, 6–4
Ladies' Invitation Doubles Final	(United States) Martina Navratilova (Czech Republic) Jana Novotná	(United States) Tracy Austin (United States) Kathy Rinaldi	7–5, 6–0
Boys' Doubles Final	(United Kingdom) Liam Broady (United Kingdom) Tom Farquharson	(United Kingdom) Lewis Burton (United Kingdom) George Morgan	7–6^{(7–4)}, 6–4
