= 2009 Wimbledon Championships – Day-by-day summaries =

The 2009 Wimbledon Championships are described below in detail, in the form of day-by-day summaries.

== Day 1 (22 June) ==
The first day of Wimbledon 2009 saw the early withdrawal of defending champion and number 1 seed Rafael Nadal due to injury. Instead, 2008 Men's Singles runner-up and five-time Wimbledon Champion Roger Federer opened on Centre Court, winning his first round match in straight sets. Amongst the first day's winners were 2008 Australian Open Champion Novak Djokovic, 2009 French Open finalist Robin Söderling, Fernando Verdasco, Marin Čilić, Ivo Karlović, Jo-Wilfried Tsonga, Mardy Fish and former French Open champion Guillermo Cañas. Spanish player Nicolás Almagro survived a five set match against Juan Mónaco despite losing the first two sets, 6–7^{(3–7)}, 6–7^{(7–9)}, 7–6^{(7–5)}, 6–4, 8–6. Two matches were suspended on the first day: the match between Michaël Llodra and Josh Goodall, and the match between Tommy Haas and Alexander Peya. However, the first major upset of the tournament came when Italy's Andreas Seppi defeated Queen's Club finalist James Blake in straight sets, 7–5, 6–4, 7–6^{(7–5)}.

In the women's side of the draw, last year's finalist and two-time Wimbledon Champion Serena Williams easily won in straight sets; she was joined by Shahar Pe'er, Jill Craybas, Urszula Radwańska, Russian players Elena Dementieva, Alisa Kleybanova, Elena Vesnina, Nadia Petrova, and Anastasia Pavlyuchenkova, 2004 Wimbledon Champion Maria Sharapova, and 2008 semi-finalist Jie Zheng. Slovak player Daniela Hantuchová won a three set thriller against last year's Girls Singles Champion and Britain's young prodigy Laura Robson, 3–6, 6–4, 6–2, while former finalist Marion Bartoli scored the first double bagel of the tournament against Taipei's Chan Yung-jan. The 2009 Ordina Open Champion Tamarine Tanasugarn lost to Arantxa Parra Santonja in straight sets, but the major upset was when Ai Sugiyama defeated Patty Schnyder in straight sets.

- Seeds out:
  - Men's Singles: (United States) James Blake [17], (Spain) Feliciano López [21]
  - Women's Singles: (Switzerland) Patty Schnyder [21], (Canada) Aleksandra Wozniak [23]
- Schedule of Play

Matches on main courts
Matches on Centre Court
Event	Winner	Loser	Score
Gentlemen's Singles 1st Round	(Switzerland) Roger Federer [2]	(Chinese Taipei) Lu Yen-hsun	7–5, 6–3, 6–2
Ladies' Singles 1st Round	(United States) Serena Williams [2]	(Portugal) Neuza Silva [Q]	6–1, 7–5
Gentlemen's Singles 1st Round	(Serbia) Novak Djokovic [4]	(France) Julien Benneteau	6–7^{(8–10)}, 7–6^{(7–1)}, 6–2, 6–4
Matches on No. 1 Court
Event	Winner	Loser	Score
Ladies' Singles 1st Round	(Russia) Maria Sharapova [24]	(Ukraine) Viktoriya Kutuzova [Q]	7–5, 6–4
Gentlemen's Singles 1st Round	(Sweden) Robin Söderling [13]	(Luxembourg) Gilles Müller	6–7^{(4–7)}, 7–5, 6–1, 6–2
Gentlemen's Singles 1st Round	(Spain) Fernando Verdasco [7]	(United Kingdom) James Ward [WC]	6–1, 6–3, 6–4
Ladies' Singles 1st Round	(France) Mathilde Johansson	(United Kingdom) Melanie South [WC]	7–5, 7–6^{(7–5)}

== Day 2 (23 June) ==
In the men's singles 2008 US Open finalist Andy Murray advanced to the second round, and he was joined by two-time Wimbledon finalist Andy Roddick, 2003 French Open Champion Juan Carlos Ferrero, Juan Martín del Potro, Gilles Simon, Tommy Haas, 2002 Wimbledon Champion Lleyton Hewitt, Nikolay Davydenko, David Ferrer, and Stan Wawrinka. "The Magician" Fabrice Santoro, who was competing in his last Wimbledon, scored a straight set victory over Nicolas Kiefer, 6–4, 6–2, 6–2. Three retirements were recorded on the men's side, with Denis Istomin retiring against Fabio Fognini, Grigor Dimitrov retiring against Igor Kunitsyn, and Dmitry Tursunov retiring against Mischa Zverev. Nicolas Devilder fought off a five set thriller against Nicolás Lapentti, 3–6, 6–4, 6–3, 4–6, 7–5. Marat Safin was upset by Jesse Levine in four sets, 6–2, 3–6, 7–6^{(7–4)}, 6–4.

In the women's side five-time Wimbledon Champion Venus Williams got through in straight sets against Stefanie Vögele 6–3 6–2. She was joined in the second round by World No. 1 Dinara Safina, 2009 French Open Champion Svetlana Kuznetsova, former World No. 1 Jelena Janković, Vera Zvonareva, Caroline Wozniacki, Li Na, Shuai Peng, Agnieszka Radwańska, Flavia Pennetta, Carla Suárez Navarro, Samantha Stosur, Maria Kirilenko, and Sabine Lisicki. Two former World No. 1 and Grand Slam champions were pushed to their limit, with Ana Ivanovic prevailing over Lucie Hradecká, 5–7, 6–2, 8–6, and 2006 Champion Amélie Mauresmo triumphed against Melinda Czink, 6–1, 4–6, 6–2.

In the Men's Doubles, second seeds Daniel Nestor and Nenad Zimonjić won their first round, while sixth seed Mariusz Fyrstenberg and Marcin Matkowski were upset by Americans Eric Butorac and Scott Lipsky in straight sets, 6–3, 6–3, 6–3. The Women's Doubles sixth seeds Daniela Hantuchová and Ai Sugiyama got through the first round, and were joined by Shahar Pe'er and Gisela Dulko.

- Seeds out:
  - Men's Singles: (Russia) Marat Safin [14], (Russia) Dmitry Tursunov [25], (Germany) Nicolas Kiefer [33]
  - Women's Singles: (France) Alizé Cornet [22], (Estonia) Kaia Kanepi [25], (Austria) Sybille Bammer [29], (Hungary) Ágnes Szávay [30], (Russia) Anna Chakvetadze [32]
  - Men's Doubles: (Poland) Mariusz Fyrstenberg / (Poland) Marcin Matkowski [6]
- Schedule of Play

Matches on main courts
Matches on Centre Court
Event	Winner	Loser	Score
Ladies' Singles 1st Round	(United States) Venus Williams [3]	(Switzerland) Stefanie Vögele	6–3, 6–2
Gentlemen's Singles 1st Round	(United States) Andy Roddick [6]	(France) Jérémy Chardy	6–3, 7–6^{(7–3)}, 4–6, 6–3
Gentlemen's Singles 1st Round	(United Kingdom) Andy Murray [3]	(United States) Robert Kendrick	7–5, 6–7^{(3–7)}, 6–3, 6–4
Matches on No. 1 Court
Event	Winner	Loser	Score
Gentlemen's Singles 1st Round	(Argentina) Juan Martín del Potro [5]	(France) Arnaud Clément	6–3, 6–1, 6–2
Ladies' Singles 1st Round	(Russia) Dinara Safina [1]	(Spain) Lourdes Domínguez Lino	7–5, 6–3
Gentlemen's Singles 1st Round	(Spain) Juan Carlos Ferrero [WC]	(Russia) Mikhail Youzhny	6–3, 7–6^{(7–3)}, 6–3

== Day 3 (24 June) ==
- Seeds out:
  - Men's Singles: (Germany) Rainer Schüttler [18]
  - Women's Singles: (China) Zheng Jie [16], (Russia) Maria Sharapova [24], (Russia) Alisa Kleybanova [27], (Russia) Anastasia Pavlyuchenkova [31]
  - Men's Doubles: (South Africa) Rik de Voest / (Australia) Ashley Fisher [14], (Australia) Stephen Huss / (United Kingdom) Ross Hutchins [16]
  - Women's Doubles: (Russia) Maria Kirilenko / (Italy) Flavia Pennetta [8] / (France) Nathalie Dechy / (Italy) Mara Santangelo [14]
- Schedule of Play

Matches on main courts
Matches on Centre Court
Event	Winner	Loser	Score
Ladies' Singles 2nd Round	(Argentina) Gisela Dulko	(Russia) Maria Sharapova [24]	6–2, 3–6, 6–4
Gentlemen's Singles 2nd Round	(Switzerland) Roger Federer [2]	(Spain) Guillermo García López	6–2, 6–2, 6–4
Gentlemen's Singles 2nd Round	(Croatia) Marin Čilić [11]	(United States) Sam Querrey	4–6, 7–6^{(7–3)}, 6–3, 6–7^{(4–7)}, 6–4
Matches on No. 1 Court
Event	Winner	Loser	Score
Gentlemen's Singles 2nd Round	(Serbia) Novak Djokovic [4]	(Germany) Simon Greul [Q]	7–5, 6–1, 6–4
Ladies' Singles 2nd Round	(United States) Serena Williams [2]	(Australia) Jarmila Groth	6–2, 6–1
Gentlemen's Singles 2nd Round	(Germany) Tommy Haas [24]	(France) Michaël Llodra	4–3 retired

== Day 4 (25 June) ==
- Seeds out:
  - Men's Singles: (Argentina) Juan Martín del Potro [5]
  - Men's Doubles: (Czech Republic) Lukáš Dlouhý / (India) Leander Paes [3], (South Africa) Jeff Coetzee / (Australia) Jordan Kerr [12]
  - Women's Doubles: (Chinese Taipei) Hsieh Su-wei / (China) Peng Shuai [5], (United States) Lisa Raymond / (Russia) Vera Zvonareva [9]
- Schedule of Play

Matches on main courts
Matches on Centre Court
Event	Winner	Loser	Score
Gentlemen's Singles 2nd Round	(Australia) Lleyton Hewitt	(Argentina) Juan Martín del Potro [5]	6–3, 7–5, 7–5
Ladies' Singles 2nd Round	(Denmark) Caroline Wozniacki [9]	(Russia) Maria Kirilenko	6–0, 6–4
Gentlemen's Singles 2nd Round	(United Kingdom) Andy Murray [3]	(Latvia) Ernests Gulbis	6–2, 7–5, 6–3
Matches on No. 1 Court
Event	Winner	Loser	Score
Ladies' Singles 2nd Round	(United States) Venus Williams [3]	(Ukraine) Kateryna Bondarenko	6–3, 6–2
Gentlemen's Singles 2nd Round	(United States) Andy Roddick [6]	(Russia) Igor Kunitsyn	6–4, 6–2, 3–6, 6–2
Gentlemen's Singles 2nd Round	(Chile) Fernando González [10]	(Argentina) Leonardo Mayer	6–7^{(4–7)}, 6–4, 6–4, 6–4

== Day 5 (26 June) ==
- Seeds out:
  - Men's Singles: (France) Jo-Wilfried Tsonga [9], (Spain) Tommy Robredo [15], (Germany) Philipp Kohlschreiber [27], (United States) Mardy Fish 28], (Spain) Albert Montañés [31]
  - Women's Singles: (France) Marion Bartoli [12], (Slovakia) Dominika Cibulková [14], (Romania) Sorana Cîrstea [28]
  - Men's Doubles: (Brazil) Marcelo Melo / (Brazil) André Sá [11], (Czech Republic) František Čermák / (Slovakia) Michal Mertiňák [13]
- Schedule of Play

Matches on main courts
Matches on Centre Court
Event	Winner	Loser	Score
Gentlemen's Singles 3rd Round	(Switzerland) Roger Federer [2]	(Germany) Philipp Kohlschreiber [27]	6–3, 6–2, 6–7^{(5–7)}, 6–1
Ladies' Singles 3rd Round	(Belarus) Victoria Azarenka [8]	(Romania) Sorana Cîrstea [28]	7–6^{(7–2)}, 6–3
Gentlemen's Singles 3rd Round	(Serbia) Novak Djokovic [4]	(United States) Mardy Fish [28]	6–4, 6–4, 6–4
Matches on No. 1 Court
Event	Winner	Loser	Score
Ladies' Singles 3rd Round	(Russia) Elena Dementieva [4]	(Russia) Regina Kulikova [Q]	6–1, 6–2
Gentlemen's Singles 3rd Round	(Croatia) Ivo Karlović [22]	(France) Jo-Wilfried Tsonga [9]	7–6^{(7–5)}, 6–7^{(5–7)}, 7–5, 7–6^{(7–5)}
Gentlemen's Singles 3rd Round	(Germany) Tommy Haas [24] vs (Croatia) Marin Čilić [11]		7–5, 7–5, 1–6, 6–7^{(3–7)}, 6–6, suspended

== Day 6 (27 June) ==
- Seeds out:
  - Men's Singles: (Chile) Fernando González [10], (Croatia) Marin Čilić [11], (Russia) Nikolay Davydenko [12], (Austria) Jürgen Melzer [26], (Serbia) Viktor Troicki [30]
  - Women's Singles: (Russia) Svetlana Kuznetsova [5], (Serbia) Jelena Janković [13], (Italy) Flavia Pennetta [15], (Australia) Samantha Stosur [18], (China) Li Na [19], (Spain) Anabel Medina Garrigues [20]
  - Men's Doubles: (United States) Travis Parrott / (Slovakia) Filip Polášek [10]
  - Women's Doubles: (Slovakia) Daniela Hantuchová / (Japan) Ai Sugiyama [6], (Chinese Taipei) Chuang Chia-jung / (India) Sania Mirza [15], (Russia) Svetlana Kuznetsova / (France) Amélie Mauresmo [16]
  - Mixed Doubles: (Serbia) Nenad Zimonjić / (China) Yan Zi [10], (Brazil) Marcelo Melo / (China) Peng Shuai [14]
- Schedule of Play

Matches on main courts
Matches on Centre Court
Event	Winner	Loser	Score
Ladies' Singles 3rd Round	(United States) Venus Williams [3]	(Spain) Carla Suárez Navarro	6–0, 6–4
Gentlemen's Singles 3rd Round	(United States) Andy Roddick [6]	(Austria) Jürgen Melzer [26]	7–6^{(7–2)}, 7–6^{(7–2)}, 4–6, 6–3
Gentlemen's Singles 3rd Round	(United Kingdom) Andy Murray [3]	(Serbia) Viktor Troicki [30]	6–2, 6–3, 6–4
Matches on No. 1 Court
Event	Winner	Loser	Score
Gentlemen's Singles 3rd Round	(Czech Republic) Tomáš Berdych [20]	(Russia) Nikolay Davydenko [12]	6–2, 6–3, 6–2
Gentlemen's Singles 3rd Round	(Germany) Tommy Haas [24]	(Croatia) Marin Čilić [11]	7–5, 7–5, 1–6, 6–7^{(3–7)}, 10–8
Ladies' Singles 3rd Round	(Germany) Sabine Lisicki	(Russia) Svetlana Kuznetsova [5]	6–2, 7–5
Gentlemen's Singles 3rd Round	(Spain) Juan Carlos Ferrero [WC]	(Chile) Fernando González [10]	4–6, 7–5, 6–4, 4–6, 6–4

== Middle Sunday (28 June) ==
Middle Sunday in Wimbledon is traditionally a rest day, without any play, and this was the case in 2009. The seventh day of the competition, consequently, fell on Monday 29 June.

== Day 7 (29 June) ==
- Seeds out:
  - Men's Singles: (Spain) Fernando Verdasco [7], (France) Gilles Simon [8], (Sweden) Robin Söderling [13], (Switzerland) Stan Wawrinka [19], (Czech Republic) Tomáš Berdych [20], (Czech Republic) Radek Štěpánek [23], (Russia) Igor Andreev [29]
  - Women's Singles: (Denmark) Caroline Wozniacki [9], (Russia) Nadia Petrova [10], (Serbia) Ana Ivanovic [13], (France) Amélie Mauresmo [17], (France) Virginie Razzano [26]
  - Men's Doubles: (Czech Republic) Martin Damm / (Sweden) Robert Lindstedt [15]
  - Women's Doubles: (Belarus) Victoria Azarenka / (Russia) Elena Vesnina [7], (United States) Bethanie Mattek-Sands / (Russia) Nadia Petrova [10], (China) Yan Zi / (China) Zheng Jie [13]
  - Mixed Doubles: (Poland) Marcin Matkowski / (United States) Lisa Raymond [3], (India) Mahesh Bhupathi / (India) Sania Mirza [13]
- Schedule of Play

Matches on main courts
Matches on Centre Court
Event	Winner	Loser	Score
Gentlemen's Singles 4th Round	(Switzerland) Roger Federer [2]	(Sweden) Robin Söderling [13]	6–4, 7–6^{(7–5)}, 7–6^{(7–5)}
Ladies' Singles 4th Round	(Russia) Dinara Safina [1]	(France) Amélie Mauresmo [17]	4–6, 6–3, 6–4
Gentlemen's Singles 4th Round	(United Kingdom) Andy Murray [3]	(Switzerland) Stan Wawrinka [19]	2–6, 6–3, 6–3, 5–7, 6–3
Matches on No. 1 Court
Event	Winner	Loser	Score
Ladies' Singles 4th Round	(United States) Venus Williams [3]	(Serbia) Ana Ivanovic [13]	6–1, 0–1, retired
Gentlemen's Singles 4th Round	(Croatia) Ivo Karlović [22]	(Spain) Fernando Verdasco [7]	7–6^{(7–5)}, 6–7^{(4–7)}, 6–3, 7–6^{(11–9)}
Gentlemen's Singles 4th Round	(United States) Andy Roddick [6]	(Czech Republic) Tomáš Berdych [20]	7–6^{(7–4)}, 6–4, 6–3

== Day 8 (30 June) ==
- Seeds out:
  - Women's Singles: (Belarus) Victoria Azarenka [8], (Poland) Agnieszka Radwańska [11]
  - Men's Doubles: (Brazil) Bruno Soares / (Zimbabwe) Kevin Ullyett [5], (Belarus) Max Mirnyi / (Israel) Andy Ram [7], (Poland) Łukasz Kubot / (Austria) Oliver Marach [8]
  - Mixed Doubles: (Sweden) Robert Lindstedt / (Australia) Rennae Stubbs [7], (Belarus) Max Mirnyi / (Russia) Nadia Petrova [8]
- Schedule of Play

Matches on main courts
Matches on Centre Court
Event	Winner	Loser	Score
Ladies' Singles Quarterfinals	(Russia) Dinara Safina [1]	(Germany) Sabine Lisicki	6–7^{(5–7)}, 6–4, 6–1
Ladies' Singles Quarterfinals	(United States) Serena Williams [2]	(Belarus) Victoria Azarenka [8]	6–2, 6–3
Gentlemen's Doubles Quarterfinals	(United States) Bob Bryan [1] (United States) Mike Bryan [1]	(Brazil) Bruno Soares [5] (Zimbabwe) Kevin Ullyett [5]	6–2, 6–1, 6–4
Matches on No. 1 Court
Event	Winner	Loser	Score
Ladies' Singles Quarterfinals	(United States) Venus Williams [3]	(Poland) Agnieszka Radwańska [11]	6–1, 6–2
Ladies' Singles Quarterfinals	(Russia) Elena Dementieva [4]	(Italy) Francesca Schiavone	6–2, 6–2
Gentlemen's Doubles Quarterfinals	(Canada) Daniel Nestor [2] (Serbia) Nenad Zimonjić [2]	(Poland) Łukasz Kubot [8] (Austria) Oliver Marach [8]	6–2, 6–3, 6–4

== Day 9 (1 July) ==
- Seeds out:
  - Men's Singles: (Serbia) Novak Djokovic [4], (Croatia) Ivo Karlović [22]
  - Men's Doubles: (India) Mahesh Bhupathi / (The Bahamas) Mark Knowles [4]
  - Women's Doubles: (Spain) Nuria Llagostera Vives / (Spain) María José Martínez Sánchez [11] / (Germany) Anna-Lena Grönefeld / (United States) Vania King [12]
  - Mixed Doubles: (Canada) Daniel Nestor / (Russia) Elena Vesnina [5], (United States) Mike Bryan / (United States) Bethanie Mattek-Sands [6], (Germany) Christopher Kas / (Chinese Taipei) Chuang Chia-jung [16]
- Schedule of Play

Matches on main courts
Matches on Centre Court
Event	Winner	Loser	Score
Gentlemen's Singles Quarterfinals	(Switzerland) Roger Federer [2]	(Croatia) Ivo Karlović [22]	6–3, 7–5, 7–6^{(7–3)}
Gentlemen's Singles Quarterfinals	(United Kingdom) Andy Murray [3]	(Spain) Juan Carlos Ferrero [WC]	7–5, 6–3, 6–2
Gentlemen's Invitation Doubles Round Robin	(France) Guy Forget (France) Cédric Pioline	(United States) Todd Martin (United States) David Wheaton	6–3, 6–4
Matches on No. 1 Court
Event	Winner	Loser	Score
Gentlemen's Singles Quarterfinals	(Germany) Tommy Haas [24]	(Serbia) Novak Djokovic [4]	7–5, 7–6^{(8–6)}, 4–6, 6–3
Gentlemen's Singles Quarterfinals	(United States) Andy Roddick [6]	(Australia) Lleyton Hewitt	6–3, 6–7^{(10–12)}, 7–6^{(7–1)}, 4–6, 6–4

== Day 10 (2 July) ==
- Seeds out:
  - Women's Singles: (Russia) Dinara Safina [1], (Russia) Elena Dementieva [4]
  - Men's Doubles: (South Africa) Wesley Moodie / (Belgium) Dick Norman [9]
  - Mixed Doubles: (United States) Bob Bryan / (Australia) Samantha Stosur [2], (Zimbabwe) Kevin Ullyett / (Chinese Taipei) Hsieh Su-wei [3], (Brazil) André Sá / (Japan) Ai Sugiyama [11]
- Schedule of Play

Matches on main courts
Matches on Centre Court
Event	Winner	Loser	Score
Ladies' Singles Semifinals	(United States) Serena Williams [2]	(Russia) Elena Dementieva [4]	6–7^{(4–7)}, 7–5, 8–6
Ladies' Singles Semifinals	(United States) Venus Williams [3]	(Russia) Dinara Safina [1]	6–1, 6–0
Gentlemen's Doubles Semifinals	(Canada) Daniel Nestor [2] (Serbia) Nenad Zimonjić [2]	(United States) James Blake (United States) Mardy Fish	5–7, 3–6, 6–2, 7–6^{(7–3)}, 10–8
Matches on No. 1 Court
Event	Winner	Loser	Score
Gentlemen's Doubles Semifinals	(United States) Bob Bryan [1] (United States) Mike Bryan [1]	(South Africa) Wesley Moodie [9] (Belgium) Dick Norman [9]	7–6^{(7–4)}, 7–6^{(7–3)}, 6–4
Mixed Doubles Quarterfinals	(India) Leander Paes [1] (Zimbabwe) Cara Black [1]	(Brazil) André Sá [11] (Japan) Ai Sugiyama [11]	6–3, 6–3
Mixed Doubles Quarterfinals	(The Bahamas) Mark Knowles [9] (Germany) Anna-Lena Grönefeld [9]	(United States) Bob Bryan [2] (Australia) Samantha Stosur [2]	0–6, 7–5, 6–3
Gentlemen's Invitation Doubles Round Robin	(Netherlands) Jacco Eltingh (Netherlands) Paul Haarhuis	(Australia) Todd Woodbridge (Australia) Mark Woodforde	7–6^{(10–8)}, 6–3

== Day 11 (3 July) ==
- Seeds out:
  - Men's Singles: (United Kingdom) Andy Murray [3], (Germany) Tommy Haas [24]
  - Women's Doubles: (Zimbabwe) Cara Black / (United States) Liezel Huber [1], (Spain) Anabel Medina Garrigues / (Spain) Virginia Ruano Pascual [2]
  - Mixed Doubles: (Australia) Stephen Huss / (Spain) Virginia Ruano Pascual [12]
- Schedule of Play

Matches on main courts
Matches on Centre Court
Event	Winner	Loser	Score
Gentlemen's Singles Semifinals	(Switzerland) Roger Federer [2]	(Germany) Tommy Haas [24]	7–6^{(7–3)}, 7–5, 6–3
Gentlemen's Singles Semifinals	(United States) Andy Roddick [6]	(United Kingdom) Andy Murray [3]	6–4, 4–6, 7–6^{(9–7)}, 7–6^{(7–5)}
Mixed Doubles Semifinals	(The Bahamas) Mark Knowles [9] (Germany) Anna-Lena Grönefeld [9]	(United Kingdom) Jamie Murray (United States) Liezel Huber	6–2, 7–5
Matches on No. 1 Court
Event	Winner	Loser	Score
Ladies' Doubles Semifinals	(United States) Serena Williams [4] (United States) Venus Williams [4]	(Zimbabwe) Cara Black [1] (United States) Liezel Huber [1]	6–1, 6–2
Ladies' Invitation Doubles Round Robin	(United States) Martina Navratilova (Czech Republic) Helena Suková	(United States) Tracy Austin (United States) Kathy Rinaldi-Stunkel	7–5, 6–3
Mixed Doubles Semifinals	(India) Leander Paes [1] (Zimbabwe) Cara Black [1]	(Australia) Stephen Huss [12] (Spain) Virginia Ruano Pascual [12]	6–4, 6–4
Senior Gentlemen's Invitation Doubles Round Robin	(United States) Kevin Curren (United States) Johan Kriek	(Iran) Mansour Bahrami (France) Henri Leconte	6–1, 6–4

== Day 12 (4 July) ==
- Seeds out:
  - Women's Singles: (United States) Venus Williams [3]
  - Men's Doubles: (United States) Bob Bryan / (United States) Mike Bryan [1]
  - Women's Doubles: (Australia) Samantha Stosur / (Australia) Rennae Stubbs [3]
- Schedule of Play

Matches on main courts
Matches on Centre Court
Event	Winner	Loser	Score
Ladies' Singles Final	(United States) Serena Williams [2]	(United States) Venus Williams [3]	7–6^{(7–3)}, 6–2
Gentlemen's Doubles Final	(Canada) Daniel Nestor [2] (Serbia) Nenad Zimonjić [2]	(United States) Bob Bryan [1] (United States) Mike Bryan [1]	7–6^{(9–7)}, 6–7^{(3–7)}, 7–6^{(7–3)}, 6–3
Ladies' Doubles Final	(United States) Serena Williams [4] (United States) Venus Williams [4]	(Australia) Samantha Stosur [3] (Australia) Rennae Stubbs [3]	7–6^{(7–4)}, 6–4
Matches on No. 1 Court
Event	Winner	Loser	Score
Girls' Singles Final	(Thailand) Noppawan Lertcheewakarn [4]	(France) Kristina Mladenovic [1]	3–6, 6–3, 6–1
Senior Gentlemen's Invitation Doubles Round Robin	(United Kingdom) Jeremy Bates (Sweden) Anders Järryd	(Sweden) Joakim Nyström (Sweden) Mats Wilander	6–1, 6–3
Gentlemen's Invitation Doubles Round Robin	(Australia) Todd Woodbridge (Australia) Mark Woodforde	(France) Guy Forget (France) Cédric Pioline	1–6, 7–6^{(10–8)}, 13–11

== Day 13 (5 July) ==
Roger Federer won his sixth Wimbledon title defeated Andy Roddick in five sets, Federer surpassed Pete Sampras as the all-time Grand Slam record of 15 titles and reclaimed the ATP world no. 1 from Nadal.

- Seeds out:
  - Men's Singles: (United States) Andy Roddick [6]
  - Mixed Doubles: (India) Leander Paes / (Zimbabwe) Cara Black [1]
- Schedule of Play

Matches on main courts
Matches on Centre Court
Event	Winner	Loser	Score
Gentlemen's Singles Final	(Switzerland) Roger Federer [2]	(United States) Andy Roddick [6]	5–7, 7–6^{(8–6)}, 7–6^{(5–7)}, 3–6, 16–14
Mixed Doubles Final	(The Bahamas) Mark Knowles [9] (Germany) Anna-Lena Grönefeld [9]	(India) Leander Paes [1] (Zimbabwe) Cara Black [1]	7–5, 6–3
Matches on No. 1 Court
Event	Winner	Loser	Score
Boys' Singles Final	(Russia) Andrey Kuznetsov	(United States) Jordan Cox	4–6, 6–2, 6–2
Girls' Doubles Final	(Thailand) Noppawan Lertcheewakarn (Australia) Sally Peers	(France) Kristina Mladenovic [2] (Croatia) Silvia Njirić [2]	6–1, 6–1
Gentlemen's Invitation Doubles Final	(Netherlands) Jacco Eltingh (Netherlands) Paul Haarhuis	(United States) Donald Johnson (United States) Jared Palmer	7–6^{(7–2)}, 6–4
