= 2010 Wimbledon Championships – Girls' doubles =

Girls' doubles
- 2010 Wimbledon Championships

Final
- Champions: (Hungary) Tímea Babos (United States) Sloane Stephens
- Runners-up: (Russia) Irina Khromacheva (Ukraine) Elina Svitolina
- Score: 6–7^{(7–9)}, 6–2, 6–2

Events
Singles	men	women		boys	girls
Doubles	men	women	mixed	boys	girls
WC Singles	men	women	quad
WC Doubles	men	women	quad
Legends	men	women	seniors
← 2009 ·	Wimbledon Championships	· 2011 →

Noppawan Lertcheewakarn and Sally Peers were the defending champions, but both were ineligible to participate in the juniors.

Tímea Babos and Sloane Stephens defeated Irina Khromacheva and Elina Svitolina in the final, 6–7^{(7–9)}, 6–2, 6–2 to win the girls' doubles tennis title at the 2010 Wimbledon Championships.

== Seeds ==
1. (Russia) Irina Khromacheva / (Ukraine) Elina Svitolina (final)
2. (Czech Republic) Karolína Plíšková / (Czech Republic) Kristýna Plíšková (quarterfinals)
3. (Tunisia) Ons Jabeur / (Puerto Rico) Monica Puig (semifinals)
4. (Hungary) Tímea Babos / (United States) Sloane Stephens (champions)
5. (Paraguay) Verónica Cepede Royg / (Romania) Cristina Dinu (semifinals)
6. (Belgium) An-Sophie Mestach / (Croatia) Silvia Njirić (quarterfinals)
7. (Slovenia) Nastja Kolar / (Slovakia) Chantal Škamlová (quarterfinals)
8. (Russia) Daria Gavrilova / (Belarus) Ilona Kremen (second round)

== Draw ==
=== Key ===
- Q = Qualifier
- WC = Wild card
- LL = Lucky loser
- Alt = Alternate
- SE = Special exempt
- PR = Protected ranking
- ITF = ITF entry
- JE = Junior exempt
- w/o = Walkover
- r = Retired
- d = Defaulted
- SR = Special ranking

=== Finals ===
Semifinals
1	(Russia) Irina Khromacheva (Ukraine) Elina Svitolina	6	6
3	(Tunisia) Ons Jabeur (Puerto Rico) Monica Puig	4	1
4	(Hungary) Tímea Babos (United States) Sloane Stephens	6	6
5	(Paraguay) Verónica Cepede Royg (Romania) Cristina Dinu	1	3

Final
1	(Russia) Irina Khromacheva (Ukraine) Elina Svitolina	7^{9}	2	2
4	(Hungary) Tímea Babos (United States) Sloane Stephens	6^{7}	6	6

=== Top half ===
First round
1	(Russia) Irina Khromacheva (Ukraine) Elina Svitolina	6	6
(Canada) Gabriela Dabrowski (United Kingdom) Jennifer Ren	4	2
(Ukraine) Sofiya Kovalets (Uzbekistan) Sabina Sharipova	7^{7}	3	6
(Thailand) Luksika Kumkhum (Indonesia) Grace Sari Ysidora	6^{4}	6	1
WC	(United Kingdom) Katy Dunne (United Kingdom) Jessica Ren	3	3
(Czech Republic) Denisa Allertová (Slovakia) Lucia Butkovská	6	6
(Japan) Sachie Ishizu (Japan) Akiko Omae	6^{3}	4
8	(Russia) Daria Gavrilova (Belarus) Ilona Kremen	7^{7}	6
3	(Tunisia) Ons Jabeur (Puerto Rico) Monica Puig	6	6
(Serbia) Doroteja Erić (Montenegro) Danka Kovinić	4	3
WC	(United Kingdom) Eleanor Dean (United Kingdom) Tara Moore	7	5	4
(United States) Krista Hardebeck (United States) Grace Min	5	7	6
(Venezuela) Andrea Gámiz (Venezuela) Adriana Pérez	4	3
(Russia) Ksenia Kirillova (Russia) Yulia Putintseva	6	6
(Chile) Fernanda Brito (Argentina) Agustina Sol Eskenazi	1	2
7	(Slovenia) Nastja Kolar (Slovakia) Chantal Škamlová	6	6

Second round
1	(Russia) I Khromacheva (Ukraine) E Svitolina	6	6
(Ukraine) S Kovalets (Uzbekistan) S Sharipova	1	3
(Czech Republic) D Allertová (Slovakia) L Butkovská	5	6	6
8	(Russia) D Gavrilova (Belarus) I Kremen	7	4	3
3	(Tunisia) O Jabeur (Puerto Rico) M Puig	7^{7}	7
(United States) K Hardebeck (United States) G Min	6^{3}	5
(Russia) K Kirillova (Russia) Y Putintseva	1	3
7	(Slovenia) N Kolar (Slovakia) C Škamlová	6	6

Quarterfinals
1	(Russia) I Khromacheva (Ukraine) E Svitolina	6^{5}	6	8
(Czech Republic) D Allertová (Slovakia) L Butkovská	7^{7}	3	6
3	(Tunisia) O Jabeur (Puerto Rico) M Puig	7	6
7	(Slovenia) N Kolar (Slovakia) C Škamlová	5	4

Semifinals
1	(Russia) I Khromacheva (Ukraine) E Svitolina	6	6
3	(Tunisia) O Jabeur (Puerto Rico) M Puig	4	1

=== Bottom half ===
First round
6	(Belgium) An-Sophie Mestach (Croatia) Silvia Njirić	6	4	7
(Tunisia) Nour Abbès (Madagascar) Zarah Razafimahatratra	2	6	5
(Belarus) Polina Pekhova (Netherlands) Demi Schuurs	6	6
(Uzbekistan) Nigina Abduraimova (Belarus) Aliaksandra Sasnovich	0	2
(Canada) Eugenie Bouchard (Norway) Ulrikke Eikeri	6	6
(Chile) Cecilia Costa Melgar (France) Clothilde de Bernardi	1	2
WC	(United Kingdom) Lucy Brown (United Kingdom) Laura Robson	1	4
4	(Hungary) Tímea Babos (United States) Sloane Stephens	6	6
5	(Paraguay) Verónica Cepede Royg (Romania) Cristina Dinu	7^{7}	2	6
(Denmark) Mai Grage (Japan) Emi Mutaguchi	6^{4}	6	1
WC	(United Kingdom) Ruth Seaborne (United Kingdom) Francesca Stephenson	4	7^{7}	3
(Serbia) Jovana Jakšić (Belgium) Alison Van Uytvanck	6	6^{2}	6
(United Kingdom) Natalie Beazant (Russia) Santa Shumilina	6	2	2
(United States) Ester Goldfeld (United States) Chanelle Van Nguyen	4	6	6
Alt	(Japan) Miyu Kato (Australia) Harriet Sheahan	1	3
2	(Czech Republic) Karolína Plíšková (Czech Republic) Kristýna Plíšková	6	6

Second round
6	(Belgium) A-S Mestach (Croatia) S Njirić	7	7^{7}
(Belarus) P Pekhova (Netherlands) D Schuurs	5	6^{4}
(Canada) E Bouchard (Norway) U Eikeri	6	2	3
4	(Hungary) T Babos (United States) S Stephens	1	6	6
5	(Paraguay) V Cepede Royg (Romania) C Dinu	7	6
(Serbia) J Jakšić (Belgium) A Van Uytvanck	5	3
(United States) E Goldfeld (United States) C Van Nguyen	0	6	3
2	(Czech Republic) Ka Plíšková (Czech Republic) Kr Plíšková	6	4	6

Quarterfinals
6	(Belgium) A-S Mestach (Croatia) S Njirić	5	2
4	(Hungary) T Babos (United States) S Stephens	7	6
5	(Paraguay) V Cepede Royg (Romania) C Dinu	3	7^{7}	7
2	(Czech Republic) Ka Plíšková (Czech Republic) Kr Plíšková	6	6^{5}	5

Semifinals
4	(Hungary) T Babos (United States) S Stephens	6	6
5	(Paraguay) V Cepede Royg (Romania) C Dinu	1	3
