= 2010 Wimbledon Championships – Senior gentlemen's invitation doubles =

Senior gentlemen's invitation doubles
- 2010 Wimbledon Championships

Final
- Champions: (Australia) Pat Cash (Australia) Mark Woodforde
- Runners-up: (United Kingdom) Jeremy Bates (Sweden) Anders Järryd
- Score: 6–2, 7–6^{(7–5)}

Events
Singles	men	women		boys	girls
Doubles	men	women	mixed	boys	girls
WC Singles	men	women	quad
WC Doubles	men	women	quad
Legends	men	women	seniors
← 2009 ·	Wimbledon Championships	· 2011 →

Pat Cash and Mark Woodforde defeated the defending champions Jeremy Bates and Anders Järryd in the final, 6–2, 7–6^{(7–5)} to win the senior gentlemen's invitation doubles tennis title at the 2010 Wimbledon Championships.

== Draw ==
=== Key ===
- Q = Qualifier
- WC = Wild card
- LL = Lucky loser
- Alt = Alternate
- ITF = ITF entry
- PR = Protected ranking
- SR = Special ranking
- SE = Special exempt
- JE = Junior exempt
- JR = Junior Accelerator Programme entrant
- CO = College Accelerator Programme entrant
- NG = Next Gen Accelerator Program entrant
- w/o = Walkover
- r = Retired
- d = Defaulted

=== Final ===
Final
(United Kingdom) Jeremy Bates (Sweden) Anders Järryd	2	6^{5}
(Australia) Pat Cash (Australia) Mark Woodforde	6	7^{7}

=== Group A ===
	(Iran) Bahrami (France) Leconte	(United Kingdom) Bates (Sweden) Järryd	(United States) Fleming (France) Forget	(Sweden) Nystöm (Sweden) Pernfors	RR; W–L	Set; W–L	Game; W–L	Standings
(Iran) Mansour Bahrami (France) Henri Leconte		2–6, 2–6	3–6, 6–2, [10–12]	7–6^{(7–2)}, 7–6^{(7–5)}	1–2	3–4	27–33	3
(United Kingdom) Jeremy Bates (Sweden) Anders Järryd	6–2, 6–2		6–4, 0–6, [10–8]	w/o	3–0	4–1	19–14	1
(United States) Peter Fleming (France) Guy Forget	6–3, 2–6, [12–10]	4–6, 6–0, [8–10]		7–5, 6–3	2–1	5–3	32–24	2
(Sweden) Joakim Nyström (Sweden) Mikael Pernfors	6–7^{(2–7)}, 6–7^{(5–7)}	w/o	5–7, 6–3		0–3	0–4	23–24	4

Standings are determined by: 1. number of wins; 2. number of matches; 3. in two-players-ties, head-to-head records; 4. in three-players-ties, percentage of sets won, or of games won; 5. steering-committee decision.

=== Group B ===
	(India) Amritraj (Australia) Fitzgerald	(Australia) Cash (Australia) Woodforde	(United States) Curren (United States) Kriek	(Australia) McNamara (Australia) McNamee	RR; W–L	Set; W–L	Game; W–L	Standings
(India) Vijay Amritraj (Australia) John Fitzgerald		3–6, 4–6	3–6, 4–6	3–6, 2–6	0–3	0–6	19–36	4
(Australia) Pat Cash (Australia) Mark Woodforde	6–3, 6–4		6–1, 6–2	6–3, 7–6^{(7–4)}	3–0	6–0	37–19	1
(United States) Kevin Curren (United States) Johan Kriek	6–3, 6–4	1–6, 2–6		6–4, 6–3	2–1	4–2	27–26	2
(Australia) Peter McNamara (Australia) Paul McNamee	6–3, 6–2	3–6, 6–7^{(4–7)}	4–6, 3–6		1–2	2–4	28–30	3

Standings are determined by: 1. number of wins; 2. number of matches; 3. in two-players-ties, head-to-head records; 4. in three-players-ties, percentage of sets won, or of games won; 5. steering-committee decision.
