= 2009 Wimbledon Championships – Wheelchair men's doubles =

Wheelchair men's doubles
- 2009 Wimbledon Championships

Final
- Champions: (France) Stéphane Houdet (France) Michaël Jérémiasz
- Runners-up: (Netherlands) Robin Ammerlaan (Japan) Shingo Kunieda
- Score: 1–6, 6–4, 7–6^{(7–3)}

Events
Singles	men	women		boys	girls
Doubles	men	women	mixed	boys	girls
WC Singles	men	women	quad
WC Doubles	men	women	quad
Legends	men	women	seniors
← 2008 ·	Wimbledon Championships	· 2010 →

Stéphane Houdet and Michaël Jérémiasz defeated the two-time defending champion Robin Ammerlaan and his partner Shingo Kunieda in the final, 1–6, 6–4, 7–6^{(7–3)} to win the gentlemen's doubles wheelchair tennis title at the 2009 Wimbledon Championships.

Ammerlaan and Ronald Vink were the two-time defending champions, but did not compete together. Vink partnered Maikel Scheffers, but was defeated by Ammerlaan and Kunieda in the semifinals.

== Seeds ==
1. (France) Stéphane Houdet / (France) Michaël Jeremiasz (champions)
2. (Netherlands) Maikel Scheffers / (Netherlands) Ronald Vink (semifinals)

== Draw ==
=== Key ===
- Q = Qualifier
- WC = Wild card
- LL = Lucky loser
- Alt = Alternate
- ITF = ITF entry
- PR = Protected ranking
- SR = Special ranking
- SE = Special exempt
- JE = Junior exempt
- JR = Junior Accelerator Programme entrant
- CO = College Accelerator Programme entrant
- NG = Next Gen Accelerator Program entrant
- w/o = Walkover
- r = Retired
- d = Defaulted

=== Finals ===
Semifinals
1	(France) Stéphane Houdet (France) Michaël Jeremiasz	7^{15}	6
(Sweden) Stefan Olsson (Sweden) Peter Vikström	6^{13}	1
(Netherlands) Robin Ammerlaan (Japan) Shingo Kunieda	6^{7}	6	6
2	(Netherlands) Maikel Scheffers (Netherlands) Ronald Vink	7^{9}	4	1

Final
1	(France) Stéphane Houdet (France) Michaël Jeremiasz	1	6	7^{7}
(Netherlands) Robin Ammerlaan (Japan) Shingo Kunieda	6	4	6^{3}
