= 2010 Wimbledon Championships – Wheelchair women's doubles =

Wheelchair women's doubles
- 2010 Wimbledon Championships

Final
- Champions: (Netherlands) Esther Vergeer (Netherlands) Sharon Walraven
- Runners-up: (Australia) Daniela Di Toro (United Kingdom) Lucy Shuker
- Score: 6–2, 6–3

Events
Singles	men	women		boys	girls
Doubles	men	women	mixed	boys	girls
WC Singles	men	women	quad
WC Doubles	men	women	quad
Legends	men	women	seniors
← 2009 ·	Wimbledon Championships	· 2011 →

Defending champion Esther Vergeer and her partner Sharon Walraven defeated Daniela Di Toro and Lucy Shuker in the final, 6–2, 6–3 to win the ladies' doubles wheelchair tennis title at the 2010 Wimbledon Championships. Vergeer completed the double career Grand Slam with the win.

Korie Homan and Vergeer were the reigning champions, but Homan did not compete.

== Seeds ==
1. (Netherlands) Esther Vergeer / (Netherlands) Sharon Walraven (champions)
2. (France) Florence Gravellier / (Netherlands) Jiske Griffioen (semifinals, fourth place)

== Draw ==
=== Key ===
- Q = Qualifier
- WC = Wild card
- LL = Lucky loser
- Alt = Alternate
- ITF = ITF entry
- PR = Protected ranking
- SR = Special ranking
- SE = Special exempt
- JE = Junior exempt
- JR = Junior Accelerator Programme entrant
- CO = College Accelerator Programme entrant
- NG = Next Gen Accelerator Program entrant
- w/o = Walkover
- r = Retired
- d = Defaulted

=== Finals ===
Semifinals
1	(Netherlands) Esther Vergeer (Netherlands) Sharon Walraven	6	6
(Belgium) Annick Sevenans (Netherlands) Aniek van Koot	0	3
WC	(Australia) Daniela Di Toro (United Kingdom) Lucy Shuker	7^{7}	3	6
2	(France) Florence Gravellier (Netherlands) Jiske Griffioen	6^{4}	6	3

Final
1	(Netherlands) Esther Vergeer (Netherlands) Sharon Walraven	6	6
WC	(Australia) Daniela Di Toro (United Kingdom) Lucy Shuker	2	3
Third place
(Belgium) Annick Sevenans (Netherlands) Aniek van Koot	6	6^{2}	6
2	(France) Florence Gravellier (Netherlands) Jiske Griffioen	3	7^{7}	4
