= 2009 Wimbledon Championships – Wheelchair women's doubles =

Wheelchair women's doubles
- 2009 Wimbledon Championships

Final
- Champions: (Netherlands) Korie Homan (Netherlands) Esther Vergeer
- Runners-up: (Australia) Daniela Di Toro (United Kingdom) Lucy Shuker
- Score: 6–1, 6–3

Events
Singles	men	women		boys	girls
Doubles	men	women	mixed	boys	girls
WC Singles	men	women	quad
WC Doubles	men	women	quad
Legends	men	women	seniors
Wimbledon Championships	· 2010 →

Korie Homan and Esther Vergeer defeated Daniela Di Toro and Lucy Shuker in the final, 6–1, 6–3 to win the inaugural ladies' doubles wheelchair tennis title at the 2009 Wimbledon Championships. It was their third step towards an eventual Grand Slam, and they each completed the career Super Slam with the win.

== Seeds ==
1. (Netherlands) Korie Homan / (Netherlands) Esther Vergeer (champions)
2. (France) Florence Gravellier / (Netherlands) Jiske Griffioen (semifinals)

== Draw ==
=== Key ===
- Q = Qualifier
- WC = Wild card
- LL = Lucky loser
- Alt = Alternate
- ITF = ITF entry
- PR = Protected ranking
- SR = Special ranking
- SE = Special exempt
- JE = Junior exempt
- JR = Junior Accelerator Programme entrant
- CO = College Accelerator Programme entrant
- NG = Next Gen Accelerator Program entrant
- w/o = Walkover
- r = Retired
- d = Defaulted

=== Finals ===
Semifinals
1	(Netherlands) Korie Homan (Netherlands) Esther Vergeer	6	6
(Germany) Katharina Krüger (Netherlands) Sharon Walraven	0	0
(Australia) Daniela Di Toro (United Kingdom) Lucy Shuker	6	6
2	(France) Florence Gravellier (Netherlands) Jiske Griffioen	4	4

Final
1	(Netherlands) Korie Homan (Netherlands) Esther Vergeer	6	6
(Australia) Daniela Di Toro (United Kingdom) Lucy Shuker	1	3
