= 2009 Wimbledon Championships – Boys' doubles =

Boys' doubles
- 2009 Wimbledon Championships

Final
- Champions: (France) Pierre-Hugues Herbert (Germany) Kevin Krawietz
- Runners-up: (France) Julien Obry (France) Adrien Puget
- Score: 6–7^{(3–7)}, 6–2, 12–10

Events
Singles	men	women		boys	girls
Doubles	men	women	mixed	boys	girls
WC Singles	men	women	quad
WC Doubles	men	women	quad
Legends	men	women	seniors
← 2008 ·	Wimbledon Championships	· 2010 →

Hsieh Cheng-peng and Yang Tsung-hua were the defending champions but Yang did not compete. Hsieh partnered with Huang Liang-chi but they lost in the third round to Alexandros-Ferdinandos Georgoudas and Andrei Vasilevski.

Pierre-Hugues Herbert and Kevin Krawietz defeated Julien Obry and Adrien Puget in the final, 6–7^{(3–7)}, 6–2, 12–10 to win the boys' doubles tennis title at the 2009 Wimbledon Championships.

== Seeds ==
1. (Argentina) Andrea Collarini / (Argentina) Agustín Velotti (quarterfinals)
2. (Chinese Taipei) Hsieh Cheng-peng / (Chinese Taipei) Huang Liang-chi (quarterfinals)
3. (Argentina) Facundo Arguello / (Guatemala) Julen Urigüen (first round)
4. (United States) Evan King / (United States) Denis Kudla (quarterfinals)
5. (Belgium) Arthur De Greef / (France) Gianni Mina (withdrew)
6. (Japan) Hiroyasu Ehara / (Japan) Shuichi Sekiguchi (first round)
7. (Russia) Andrey Kuznetsov / (Germany) Dominik Schulz (withdrew)
8. (Sweden) Daniel Berta / (Czech Republic) Radim Urbanek (first round)

== Draw ==
=== Key ===
- Q = Qualifier
- WC = Wild card
- LL = Lucky loser
- Alt = Alternate
- SE = Special exempt
- PR = Protected ranking
- ITF = ITF entry
- JE = Junior exempt
- w/o = Walkover
- r = Retired
- d = Defaulted
- SR = Special ranking

=== Finals ===
Semifinals
(Spain) Carlos Boluda-Purkiss (Venezuela) David Souto	6^{5}	6	8
(France) Pierre-Hugues Herbert (Germany) Kevin Krawietz	7^{7}	3	10
(France) Julien Obry (France) Adrien Puget	7^{7}	6^{2}	14
(Greece) Alexandros-Ferdinandos Georgoudas (Belarus) Andrei Vasilevski	6^{4}	7^{7}	12

Final
(France) Pierre-Hugues Herbert (Germany) Kevin Krawietz	6^{3}	6	12
(France) Julien Obry (France) Adrien Puget	7^{7}	2	10

=== Top half ===
First round
1	(Argentina) Andrea Collarini (Argentina) Agustín Velotti	4	6	7
(United Kingdom) Liam Broady (Ukraine) Stanislav Poplavskyy	6	4	5
(Slovakia) Filip Horanský (Slovakia) Jozef Kovalík	6	6
(United Kingdom) David Thomson (United Kingdom) Mathew Thomson	4	4
WC	(United Kingdom) Lewis Burton (United Kingdom) George Morgan	6	6
(Brazil) Guilherme Clezar (Egypt) Karim-Mohamed Maamoun	3	4
(Spain) Carlos Boluda-Purkiss (Venezuela) David Souto	6	6
Alt	(New Zealand) Jordan Kelly-Houston (New Zealand) Ben McLachlan	2	3
4	(United States) Evan King (United States) Denis Kudla	6	6
(Philippines) Francis Alcantara (South Africa) Nicolaas Scholtz	4	4
(Switzerland) Sandro Ehrat (Austria) Dominik Wirlend	4	6	7
(United Kingdom) Ahmed El Menshawy (Brazil) Tiago Fernandes	6	4	5
(Italy) Alessandro Bega (Italy) Emanuele Molina	2	2
(France) Pierre-Hugues Herbert (Germany) Kevin Krawietz	6	6
(Italy) Federico Gaio (Italy) Francesco Picco	4	2
Alt	(United Kingdom) Jack Carpenter (United Kingdom) James Marsalek	6	6

Second round
1	(Argentina) A Collarini (Argentina) A Velotti	6	5	6
(Slovakia) F Horanský (Slovakia) J Kovalík	4	7	4
WC	(United Kingdom) L Burton (United Kingdom) G Morgan	6^{3}	7	15
(Spain) C Boluda-Purkiss (Venezuela) D Souto	7^{7}	5	17
4	(United States) E King (United States) D Kudla	6	6
(Switzerland) S Ehrat (Austria) D Wirlend	2	4
(France) P-H Herbert (Germany) K Krawietz	6	6
Alt	(United Kingdom) J Carpenter (United Kingdom) J Marsalek	3	2

Quarterfinals
1	(Argentina) A Collarini (Argentina) A Velotti	w/o
(Spain) C Boluda-Purkiss (Venezuela) D Souto
4	(United States) E King (United States) D Kudla	5	6^{2}
(France) P-H Herbert (Germany) K Krawietz	7	7^{7}

Semifinals
(Spain) C Boluda-Purkiss (Venezuela) D Souto	6^{5}	6	8
(France) P-H Herbert (Germany) K Krawietz	7^{7}	3	10

=== Bottom half ===
First round
6	(Japan) Hiroyasu Ehara (Japan) Shuichi Sekiguchi	6^{2}	3
(Austria) Maximilian Neuchrist (Austria) Tristan-Samuel Weissborn	7^{7}	6
(France) Julien Obry (France) Adrien Puget	7^{8}	6
WC	(United Kingdom) Alastair Barnes (United Kingdom) Oliver Golding	6^{6}	2
(United States) Devin Britton (United States) Jordan Cox	6	6
(United States) Harry Fowler (United States) Johannes Robert Van Overbeek	1	4
(Croatia) Marin Draganja (Croatia) Dino Marcan	6	7^{11}
3	(Argentina) Facundo Arguello (Guatemala) Julen Urigüen	3	6^{9}
8	(Sweden) Daniel Berta (Czech Republic) Radim Urbanek	6	6^{3}	11
WC	(United Kingdom) Tom Farquharson (United Kingdom) Stefan Sterland-Markovic	4	7^{7}	13
(Greece) Alexandros-Ferdinandos Georgoudas (Belarus) Andrei Vasilevski	6	6
WC	(United Kingdom) Richard Gabb (United Kingdom) Ashley Hewitt	4	2
(New Zealand) Sebastian Lavie (New Zealand) Riki McLachlan	6	3	4
(United States) Tennys Sandgren (Japan) Yasutaka Uchiyama	3	6	6
(United States) Mitchell Frank (India) Sudarwa Sitaram	1	2
2	(Chinese Taipei) Hsieh Cheng-peng (Chinese Taipei) Huang Liang-chi	6	6

Second round
(Austria) M Neuchrist (Austria) T-S Weissborn	4	7^{9}	3
(France) J Obry (France) A Puget	6	6^{7}	6
(United States) D Britton (United States) J Cox	6	7^{12}
(Croatia) M Draganja (Croatia) D Marcan	3	6^{10}
WC	(United Kingdom) T Farquharson (United Kingdom) S Sterland-Markovic	6	2	2
(Greece) A-F Georgoudas (Belarus) A Vasilevski	4	6	6
(United States) T Sandgren (Japan) Y Uchiyama	4	6^{5}
2	(Chinese Taipei) C-p Hsieh (Chinese Taipei) L-c Huang	6	7^{7}

Quarterfinals
(France) J Obry (France) A Puget	6	7
(United States) D Britton (United States) J Cox	3	5
(Greece) A-F Georgoudas (Belarus) A Vasilevski	6	7^{7}
2	(Chinese Taipei) C-p Hsieh (Chinese Taipei) L-c Huang	3	6^{4}

Semifinals
(France) J Obry (France) A Puget	7^{7}	6^{2}	14
(Greece) A-F Georgoudas (Belarus) A Vasilevski	6^{4}	7^{7}	12
