= 2010 Wimbledon Championships – Wheelchair men's doubles =

Wheelchair men's doubles
- 2010 Wimbledon Championships

Final
- Champions: (Netherlands) Robin Ammerlaan (Sweden) Stefan Olsson
- Runners-up: (France) Stéphane Houdet (Japan) Shingo Kunieda
- Score: 6–4, 7–6^{(7–4)}

Events
Singles	men	women		boys	girls
Doubles	men	women	mixed	boys	girls
WC Singles	men	women	quad
WC Doubles	men	women	quad
Legends	men	women	seniors
← 2009 ·	Wimbledon Championships	· 2011 →

Robin Ammerlaan and Stefan Olsson defeated the defending champion Stéphane Houdet and his partner Shingo Kunieda in the final, 6–4, 7–6^{(7–4)} to win the gentlemen's doubles wheelchair tennis title at the 2010 Wimbledon Championships.

Houdet and Michaël Jérémiasz were the reigning champions, but Jérémiasz did not compete.

== Seeds ==
1. (France) Stéphane Houdet / (Japan) Shingo Kunieda (final)
2. (Netherlands) Maikel Scheffers / (Netherlands) Ronald Vink (semifinals, third place)

== Draw ==
=== Key ===
- Q = Qualifier
- WC = Wild card
- LL = Lucky loser
- Alt = Alternate
- ITF = ITF entry
- PR = Protected ranking
- SR = Special ranking
- SE = Special exempt
- JE = Junior exempt
- JR = Junior Accelerator Programme entrant
- CO = College Accelerator Programme entrant
- NG = Next Gen Accelerator Program entrant
- w/o = Walkover
- r = Retired
- d = Defaulted

=== Finals ===
Semifinals
1	(France) Stéphane Houdet (Japan) Shingo Kunieda	6	6
WC	(France) Frédéric Cattaneo (France) Nicolas Peifer	3	2
(Netherlands) Robin Ammerlaan (Sweden) Stefan Olsson	7^{7}	6
2	(Netherlands) Maikel Scheffers (Netherlands) Ronald Vink	6^{5}	2

Final
1	(France) Stéphane Houdet (Japan) Shingo Kunieda	4	6^{4}
(Netherlands) Robin Ammerlaan (Sweden) Stefan Olsson	6	7^{7}
Third place
WC	(France) Frédéric Cattaneo (France) Nicolas Peifer	1	4
2	(Netherlands) Maikel Scheffers (Netherlands) Ronald Vink	6	6
