= 2009 Wimbledon Championships – Gentlemen's invitation doubles =

Gentlemen's invitation doubles
- 2009 Wimbledon Championships

Final
- Champions: (Netherlands) Jacco Eltingh (Netherlands) Paul Haarhuis
- Runners-up: (United States) Donald Johnson (United States) Jared Palmer
- Score: 7–6^{(7–2)}, 6–4

Events
Singles	men	women		boys	girls
Doubles	men	women	mixed	boys	girls
WC Singles	men	women	quad
WC Doubles	men	women	quad
Legends	men	women	seniors
← 2008 ·	Wimbledon Championships	· 2010 →

Jacco Eltingh and Paul Haarhuis defeated the defending champions Donald Johnson and Jared Palmer in the final, 7–6^{(7–2)}, 6–4, to win the gentlemen's invitation doubles tennis title at the 2009 Wimbledon Championships.

== Draw ==
=== Key ===
- Q = Qualifier
- WC = Wild card
- LL = Lucky loser
- Alt = Alternate
- ITF = ITF entry
- PR = Protected ranking
- SR = Special ranking
- SE = Special exempt
- JE = Junior exempt
- JR = Junior Accelerator Programme entrant
- CO = College Accelerator Programme entrant
- NG = Next Gen Accelerator Program entrant
- w/o = Walkover
- r = Retired
- d = Defaulted

=== Final ===
Final
(United States) Donald Johnson (United States) Jared Palmer	6^{2}	4
(Netherlands) Jacco Eltingh (Netherlands) Paul Haarhuis	7^{7}	6

=== Group A ===
	(Sweden) Björkman (Netherlands) Krajicek	(Australia) Cash (United Kingdom) Wilkinson	(United States) Johnson (United States) Palmer	(United Kingdom) Petchey (United Kingdom) Rusedski	RR; W–L	Set; W–L	Game; W–L	Standings
(Sweden) Jonas Björkman (Netherlands) Richard Krajicek		6–2, 6–4	4–6, 3–6	4–6, 6–4, [6–10]	1–2	3–4	29–29	2
(Australia) Pat Cash (United Kingdom) Chris Wilkinson	2–6, 4–6		3–6, 2–6	7–6^{(7–4)}, 6–4	1–2	2–4	24–34	4
(United States) Donald Johnson (United States) Jared Palmer	6–4, 6–3	6–3, 6–2		6–1, 6–7^{(5–7)}, [11–9]	3–0	6–1	37–20	1
(United Kingdom) Mark Petchey (United Kingdom) Greg Rusedski	6–4, 4–6, [10–6]	6–7^{(4–7)}, 4–6	1–6, 7–6^{(7–5)}, [9–11]		1–2	3–5	29–36	3

Standings are determined by: 1. number of wins; 2. number of matches; 3. in two-players-ties, head-to-head records; 4. in three-players-ties, percentage of sets won, or of games won; 5. steering-committee decision.

=== Group B ===
	(Netherlands) Eltingh (Netherlands) Haarhuis	(France) Forget (France) Pioline	(United States) Martin (United States) Wheaton	(Australia) Woodbridge (Australia) Woodforde	RR; W–L	Set; W–L	Game; W–L	Standings
(Netherlands) Jacco Eltingh (Netherlands) Paul Haarhuis		4–6, 7–6^{(7–1)}, [10–6]	6–4, 6–0	7–6^{(10–8)}, 6–3	3–0	6–1	37–25	1
(France) Guy Forget (France) Cédric Pioline	6–4, 6–7^{(1–7)}, [6–10]		6–3, 6–4	6–1, 6–7^{(8–10)}, [11–13]	1–2	4–4	36–28	2
(United States) Todd Martin (United States) David Wheaton	4–6, 0–6	3–6, 4–6		7–6^{(7–4)}, 6–3	1–2	2–4	24–33	3
(Australia) Todd Woodbridge (Australia) Mark Woodforde	6–7^{(8–10)}, 3–6	1–6, 7–6^{(10–8)}, [13–11]	3–6, 6–7^{(4–7)}		1–2	2–5	27–38	4

Standings are determined by: 1. number of wins; 2. number of matches; 3. in two-players-ties, head-to-head records; 4. in three-players-ties, percentage of sets won, or of games won; 5. steering-committee decision.
