= 2010 Wimbledon Championships – Gentlemen's invitation doubles =

Gentlemen's invitation doubles
- 2010 Wimbledon Championships

Final
- Champions: (United States) Donald Johnson (United States) Jared Palmer
- Runners-up: (South Africa) Wayne Ferreira (Russia) Yevgeny Kafelnikov
- Score: 6–3, 6–2

Events
Singles	men	women		boys	girls
Doubles	men	women	mixed	boys	girls
WC Singles	men	women	quad
WC Doubles	men	women	quad
Legends	men	women	seniors
← 2009 ·	Wimbledon Championships	· 2011 →

Jacco Eltingh and Paul Haarhuis were the defending champions but were eliminated in the round robin.

Donald Johnson and Jared Palmer defeated the defending champions Wayne Ferreira and Yevgeny Kafelnikov in the final, 6–3, 6–2, to win the gentlemen's invitation doubles tennis title at the 2010 Wimbledon Championships.

== Draw ==
=== Key ===
- Q = Qualifier
- WC = Wild card
- LL = Lucky loser
- Alt = Alternate
- ITF = ITF entry
- PR = Protected ranking
- SR = Special ranking
- SE = Special exempt
- JE = Junior exempt
- JR = Junior Accelerator Programme entrant
- CO = College Accelerator Programme entrant
- NG = Next Gen Accelerator Program entrant
- w/o = Walkover
- r = Retired
- d = Defaulted

=== Final ===
Final
(South Africa) Wayne Ferreira (Russia) Yevgeny Kafelnikov	3	2
(United States) Donald Johnson (United States) Jared Palmer	6	6

=== Group A ===
	(Sweden) Björkman (Australia) Woodbridge	(South Africa) Ferreira (Russia) Kafelnikov	(Netherlands) Krajicek (Germany) Stich	(United States) Gimelstob (United States) Martin	RR; W–L	Set; W–L	Game; W–L	Standings
(Sweden) Jonas Björkman (Australia) Todd Woodbridge		6–3, 3–6, [10–12]	6–3, 7–6^{(10–8)}	5–0 ret.	2–1	4–2	27–9	2
(South Africa) Wayne Ferreira (Russia) Yevgeny Kafelnikov	3–6, 6–3, [12–10]		7–6^{(7–4)}, 4–6, [10–7]	4–6, 5–7	2–1	4–4	31–34	1
(Netherlands) Richard Krajicek (Germany) Michael Stich	3–6, 6–7^{(8–10)}	6–7^{(4–7)}, 6–4, [7–10]		7–6^{(7–5)}, 6–3	1–2	3–4	34–34	3
(United States) Justin Gimelstob (United States) Todd Martin	0–5 ret.	6–4, 7–5	6–7^{(5–7)}, 3–6		1–2	2–2	22–27	4

Standings are determined by: 1. number of wins; 2. number of matches; 3. in two-players-ties, head-to-head records; 4. in three-players-ties, percentage of sets won, or of games won; 5. steering-committee decision.

=== Group B ===
	(Netherlands) Eltingh (Netherlands) Haarhuis	(Croatia) Ivanišević (France) Pioline	(United States) Johnson (United States) Palmer	(United Kingdom) Petchey (United Kingdom) Wilkinson	RR; W–L	Set; W–L	Game; W–L	Standings
(Netherlands) Jacco Eltingh (Netherlands) Paul Haarhuis		6–4, 6–3	4–6, 6–7^{(5–7)}	6–3, 7–6^{(7–4)}	2–1	4–2	35–29	2
(Croatia) Goran Ivanišević (France) Cédric Pioline	4–6, 3–6		7–6^{(7–4)}, 6–7^{(3–7)}, [5–10]	6–4, 7–6^{(7–4)}	1–2	3–4	33–36	3
(United States) Donald Johnson (United States) Jared Palmer	6–4, 7–6^{(7–5)}	6–7^{(4–7)}, 7–6^{(7–3)}, [10–5]		6–3, 7–6^{(7–3)}	3–0	6–1	40–32	1
(United Kingdom) Mark Petchey (United Kingdom) Chris Wilkinson	3–6, 6–7^{(4–7)}	4–6, 6–7^{(4–7)}	3–6, 6–7^{(3–7)}		0–3	0–6	28–39	4

Standings are determined by: 1. number of wins; 2. number of matches; 3. in two-players-ties, head-to-head records; 4. in three-players-ties, percentage of sets won, or of games won; 5. steering-committee decision.
