= 2010 Wimbledon Championships – Boys' singles =

Boys' singles
- 2010 Wimbledon Championships

Final
- Champion: (Hungary) Márton Fucsovics
- Runner-up: (Australia) Benjamin Mitchell
- Score: 6–4, 6–4

Details
- Draw: 64 (8 Q / 8 WC )
- Seeds: 16

Events
Singles	men	women		boys	girls
Doubles	men	women	mixed	boys	girls
WC Singles	men	women	quad
WC Doubles	men	women	quad
Legends	men	women	seniors
← 2009 ·	Wimbledon Championships	· 2011 →

Márton Fucsovics defeated Benjamin Mitchell in the final, 6–4, 6–4 to win the boys' singles tennis title at the 2010 Wimbledon Championships.

Andrey Kuznetsov was the defending champion, but was no longer eligible to participate in junior events.

== Seeds ==
1. (Australia) Jason Kubler (third round)
2. (Argentina) Agustín Velotti (first round)
3. (Brazil) Tiago Fernandes (third round)
4. (Peru) Duilio Beretta (first round)
5. (Czech Republic) Jiří Veselý (third round)
6. (Bosnia and Herzegovina) Damir Džumhur (quarterfinals)
7. (United States) Denis Kudla (quarterfinals)
8. (Australia) James Duckworth (quarterfinals)
9. (Argentina) Renzo Olivo (quarterfinals)
10. (Austria) Dominic Thiem (first round)
11. (Hungary) Máté Zsiga (second round)
12. (Russia) Mikhail Biryukov (third round)
13. (Hungary) Márton Fucsovics (champion)
14. (Colombia) Juan Sebastián Gómez (second round)
15. (Ecuador) Roberto Quiroz (first round)
16. (Germany) Kevin Krawietz (second round)

Click on the seed number of a player to go to their draw section.

== Draw ==
=== Key ===
- Q = Qualifier
- WC = Wild card
- LL = Lucky loser
- Alt = Alternate
- ITF = ITF entry
- PR = Protected ranking
- SR = Special ranking
- SE = Special exempt
- JE = Junior exempt
- JR = Junior Accelerator Programme entrant
- CO = College Accelerator Programme entrant
- NG = Next Gen Accelerator Program entrant
- w/o = Walkover
- r = Retired
- d = Defaulted

=== Finals ===
Quarterfinals
(United Kingdom) Oliver Golding	4	6	6
9	(Argentina) Renzo Olivo	6	4	4
Q	(Australia) Benjamin Mitchell	5	6	6
6	(Bosnia and Herzegovina) Damir Džumhur	7	2	2
7	(United States) Denis Kudla	3	3
(Argentina) Facundo Argüello	6	6
8	(Australia) James Duckworth	4	2
13	(Hungary) Márton Fucsovics	6	6

Semifinals
(United Kingdom) Oliver Golding	2	2
Q	(Australia) Benjamin Mitchell	6	6
(Argentina) Facundo Argüello	3	2
13	(Hungary) Márton Fucsovics	6	6

Final
Q	(Australia) Benjamin Mitchell	4	4
13	(Hungary) Márton Fucsovics	6	6

=== Top half ===
==== Section 1 ====
First round
1	(Australia) Jason Kubler	7	6
Q	(New Zealand) Sebastian Lavie	5	4
(Russia) Alexander Rumyantsev	3	5
(Tunisia) Ahmed Triki	6	7
(United Kingdom) Oliver Golding	6	6
(United States) Dennis Novikov	4	2
(Croatia) Mate Pavić	3	2
14	(Colombia) Juan Sebastián Gómez	6	6
9	(Argentina) Renzo Olivo	6	3	6
(Slovakia) Jozef Kovalík	4	6	3
Q	(United Kingdom) Lewis Burton	6	6
(France) Mathias Bourgue	4	4
(United States) Mitchell Frank	6	7
(Philippines) Jeson Patrombon	1	5
(Barbados) Darian King	1	6	3
5	(Czech Republic) Jiří Veselý	6	3	6

Second round
1	(Australia) J Kubler	6	6
(Tunisia) A Triki	0	2
(United Kingdom) O Golding	6	6
14	(Colombia) JS Gómez	4	4
9	(Argentina) R Olivo	6	6^{5}	6
Q	(United Kingdom) L Burton	3	7^{7}	3
(United States) M Frank	2	7^{11}	4
5	(Czech Republic) J Veselý	6	6^{9}	6

Third round
1	(Australia) J Kubler	6	3	5
(United Kingdom) O Golding	4	6	7
9	(Argentina) R Olivo	7	6
5	(Czech Republic) J Veselý	5	4

Quarterfinals
(United Kingdom) O Golding	4	6	6
9	(Argentina) R Olivo	6	4	4

==== Section 2 ====
First round
3	(Brazil) Tiago Fernandes	6	7
WC	(United Kingdom) Tom Farquharson	2	5
Q	(United States) Dane Webb	6	6
(France) Mick Lescure	3	4
Q	(Australia) Benjamin Mitchell	6	6
(Republic of Ireland) John Morrissey	3	1
LL	(United States) Mitchell Krueger	6	3	14
16	(Germany) Kevin Krawietz	3	6	16
11	(Hungary) Máté Zsiga	4	6	6
(Japan) Taro Daniel	6	2	1
(United States) Nick Chappell	2	4
(Netherlands) Justin Eleveld	6	6
Q	(Italy) Marco Cecchinato	2	1
WC	(United Kingdom) Ashley Hewitt	6	6
Q	(Argentina) Federico Coria	6^{1}	4
6	(Bosnia and Herzegovina) Damir Džumhur	7^{7}	6

Second round
3	(Brazil) T Fernandes	6	6
Q	(United States) D Webb	3	1
Q	(Australia) B Mitchell	7	6
16	(Germany) K Krawietz	5	3
11	(Hungary) M Zsiga	0	6	1
(Netherlands) J Eleveld	6	3	6
WC	(United Kingdom) A Hewitt	1	3
6	(Bosnia and Herzegovina) D Džumhur	6	6

Third round
3	(Brazil) T Fernandes	5	4
Q	(Australia) B Mitchell	7	6
(Netherlands) J Eleveld	3	2
6	(Bosnia and Herzegovina) D Džumhur	6	6

Quarterfinals
Q	(Australia) B Mitchell	5	6	6
6	(Bosnia and Herzegovina) D Džumhur	7	2	2

=== Bottom half ===
==== Section 3 ====
First round
7	(United States) Denis Kudla	6	6
(New Zealand) Ben McLachlan	1	4
(Bolivia) Hugo Dellien	0	1
WC	(United Kingdom) Liam Broady	6	6
WC	(United Kingdom) Luke Bambridge	1	3
(Brazil) Guilherme Clezar	6	6
(Australia) Ben Wagland	7	6^{3}	7
10	(Austria) Dominic Thiem	5	7^{7}	5
15	(Ecuador) Roberto Quiroz	2	6	3
(Argentina) Facundo Argüello	6	0	6
Q	(France) Grégoire Barrère	1	6	9
(Philippines) Francis Alcantara	6	1	11
(Slovakia) Filip Horanský	7	7
(United Kingdom) George Morgan	5	5
Q	(Latvia) Miķelis Lībietis	6	2	15
4	(Peru) Duilio Beretta	3	6	13

Second round
7	(United States) D Kudla	7	6
WC	(United Kingdom) L Broady	5	2
(Brazil) G Clezar	5	6^{2}
(Australia) B Wagland	7	7^{7}
(Argentina) F Argüello	4	6	6
(Philippines) F Alcantara	6	1	4
(Slovakia) F Horanský	6^{5}	6	6
Q	(Latvia) M Lībietis	7^{7}	1	3

Third round
7	(United States) D Kudla	6	7^{7}
(Australia) B Wagland	3	6^{2}
(Argentina) F Argüello	7	3	7
(Slovakia) F Horanský	5	6	5

Quarterfinals
7	(United States) D Kudla	3	3
(Argentina) F Argüello	6	6

==== Section 4 ====
First round
8	(Australia) James Duckworth	6^{2}	6	7
(Japan) Yasutaka Uchiyama	7^{7}	2	5
WC	(United Kingdom) Kyle Edmund	4	4
(United States) Raymond Sarmiento	6	6
WC	(United Kingdom) Jack Carpenter	5	6^{2}
(Finland) Micke Kontinen	7	7^{7}
(Germany) Peter Heller	4	6	5
12	(Russia) Mikhail Biryukov	6	3	7
13	(Hungary) Márton Fucsovics	7^{7}	6
(United States) Junior Alexander Ore	6^{3}	4
(Sweden) Tobias Blomgren	1	4
(Italy) Alessandro Colella	6	6
(Netherlands) Jannick Lupescu	2	6	6
(France) Romain Arneodo	6	4	4
WC	(United Kingdom) James Marsalek	6	6
2/WC	(Argentina) Agustín Velotti	3	2

Second round
8	(Australia) J Duckworth	6	7
(United States) R Sarmiento	3	5
(Finland) M Kontinen	2	1
12	(Russia) M Biryukov	6	6
13	(Hungary) M Fucsovics	6	6
(Italy) A Colella	2	0
(Netherlands) J Lupescu	6^{7}	1
WC	(United Kingdom) J Marsalek	7^{9}	6

Third round
8	(Australia) J Duckworth	6	6
12	(Russia) M Biryukov	1	4
13	(Hungary) M Fucsovics	6	6
WC	(United Kingdom) J Marsalek	3	2

Quarterfinals
8	(Australia) J Duckworth	4	2
13	(Hungary) M Fucsovics	6	6
