= 2009 Wimbledon Championships – Senior gentlemen's invitation doubles =

Senior gentlemen's invitation doubles
- 2009 Wimbledon Championships

Final
- Champions: (United Kingdom) Jeremy Bates (Sweden) Anders Järryd
- Runners-up: (Iran) Mansour Bahrami (France) Henri Leconte
- Score: 6–4, 7–6^{(7–4)}

Events
Singles	men	women		boys	girls
Doubles	men	women	mixed	boys	girls
WC Singles	men	women	quad
WC Doubles	men	women	quad
Legends	men	women	seniors
← 2008 ·	Wimbledon Championships	· 2010 →

Ken Flach and Robert Seguso were the defending champions but Seguso did not participate. Flach partnered with Danie Visser but were eliminated in the round robin.

Jeremy Bates and Anders Järryd defeated Mansour Bahrami and Henri Leconte in the final, 6–4, 7–6^{(7–4)} to win the senior gentlemen's invitation doubles tennis title at the 2009 Wimbledon Championships.

== Draw ==
=== Key ===
- Q = Qualifier
- WC = Wild card
- LL = Lucky loser
- Alt = Alternate
- ITF = ITF entry
- PR = Protected ranking
- SR = Special ranking
- SE = Special exempt
- JE = Junior exempt
- JR = Junior Accelerator Programme entrant
- CO = College Accelerator Programme entrant
- NG = Next Gen Accelerator Program entrant
- w/o = Walkover
- r = Retired
- d = Defaulted

=== Final ===
Final
(Iran) Mansour Bahrami (France) Henri Leconte	4	6^{4}
(United Kingdom) Jeremy Bates (Sweden) Anders Järryd	6	7^{7}

=== Group A ===
	(India) Amritraj (Australia) Fitzgerald	(Iran) Bahrami (France) Leconte	(United States) Curren (United States) Kriek	(United States) Flach (South Africa) Visser	RR; W–L	Set; W–L	Game; W–L	Standings
(India) Vijay Amritraj (Australia) John Fitzgerald		4–6, 4–6	6–3, 5–7, [10–8]	4–6, 6–3, [6–10]	1–2	3–5	30–32	3
(Iran) Mansour Bahrami (France) Henri Leconte	6–4, 6–4		1–6, 4–6	7–6^{(7–2)}, 6–3	2–1	4–2	30–29	1
(United States) Kevin Curren (United States) Johan Kriek	3–6, 7–5, [8–10]	6–1, 6–4		2–6, 3–6	1–2	3–4	27–29	4
(United States) Ken Flach (South Africa) Danie Visser	6–4, 3–6, [10–6]	3–6, 6–7^{(2–7)}	6–3, 6–2		2–1	4–3	31–28	2

Standings are determined by: 1. number of wins; 2. number of matches; 3. in two-players-ties, head-to-head records; 4. in three-players-ties, percentage of sets won, or of games won; 5. steering-committee decision.

=== Group B ===
	(United Kingdom) Bates (Sweden) Järryd	(United States) Fleming (Argentina) Vilas	(Australia) McNamara (Australia) McNamee	(Sweden) Nyström (Sweden) Wilander	RR; W–L	Set; W–L	Game; W–L	Standings
(United Kingdom) Jeremy Bates (Sweden) Anders Järryd		6–1, 6–1	6–4, 7–6^{(8–6)}	6–1, 6–3	3–0	6–0	37–16	1
(United States) Peter Fleming (Argentina) Guillermo Vilas	1–6, 1–6		4–6, 1–6	5–7, 2–6	0–3	0–6	14–37	4
(Australia) Peter McNamara (Australia) Paul McNamee	4–6, 6–7^{(6–8)}	6–4, 6–1		7–5, 6–1	2–1	4–2	35–24	2
(Sweden) Joakim Nyström (Sweden) Mats Wilander	1–6, 3–6	7–5, 6–2	5–7, 1–6		1–2	2–4	23–32	3

Standings are determined by: 1. number of wins; 2. number of matches; 3. in two-players-ties, head-to-head records; 4. in three-players-ties, percentage of sets won, or of games won; 5. steering-committee decision.
