= 2010 Wimbledon Championships – Girls' singles =

Girls' singles
- 2010 Wimbledon Championships

Final
- Champion: (Czech Republic) Kristýna Plíšková
- Runner-up: (Japan) Sachie Ishizu
- Score: 6–3, 4–6, 6–4

Details
- Draw: 64 (8 Q / 8 WC )
- Seeds: 16

Events
Singles	men	women		boys	girls
Doubles	men	women	mixed	boys	girls
WC Singles	men	women	quad
WC Doubles	men	women	quad
Legends	men	women	seniors
← 2009 ·	Wimbledon Championships	· 2011 →

Noppawan Lertcheewakarn was the defending champion, but chose to compete in the ladies' singles competition instead as a wild card and lost to Andrea Hlaváčková in the first round.

Kristýna Plíšková defeated Sachie Ishizu in the final, 6–3, 4–6, 6–4 to win the girls' singles tennis title at the 2010 Wimbledon Championships.

== Seeds ==
1. (Ukraine) Elina Svitolina (first round)
2. (Russia) Irina Khromacheva (quarterfinals)
3. (Hungary) Tímea Babos (third round)
4. (Czech Republic) Karolína Plíšková (second round)
5. (Puerto Rico) Monica Puig (third round)
6. (Slovenia) Nastja Kolar (second round)
7. (Canada) Gabriela Dabrowski (first round)
8. (United Kingdom) Laura Robson (semifinals)
9. (Czech Republic) Kristýna Plíšková (champion)
10. (Japan) Sachie Ishizu (final)
11. (Belgium) An-Sophie Mestach (third round)
12. (Tunisia) Ons Jabeur (quarterfinals)
13. (Paraguay) Verónica Cepede Royg (first round)
14. (Ukraine) Sofiya Kovalets (first round)
15. (Russia) Yulia Putintseva (semifinals)
16. (Russia) Daria Gavrilova (second round)

Click on the seed number of a player to go to their draw section.

== Draw ==
=== Key ===
- Q = Qualifier
- WC = Wild card
- LL = Lucky loser
- Alt = Alternate
- SE = Special exempt
- PR = Protected ranking
- ITF = ITF entry
- JE = Junior exempt
- w/o = Walkover
- r = Retired
- d = Defaulted
- SR = Special ranking

=== Finals ===
Quarterfinals
15	(Russia) Yulia Putintseva	7	6
12	(Tunisia) Ons Jabeur	5	3
(United States) Sloane Stephens	6	1	7
9	(Czech Republic) Kristýna Plíšková	4	6	9
8/WC	(United Kingdom) Laura Robson	7	6
WC	(United Kingdom) Tara Moore	5	1
10	(Japan) Sachie Ishizu	6	6
2	(Russia) Irina Khromacheva	1	2

Semifinals
15	(Russia) Yulia Putintseva	1	4
9	(Czech Republic) Kristýna Plíšková	6	6
8/WC	(United Kingdom) Laura Robson	5	6^{5}
10	(Japan) Sachie Ishizu	7	7^{7}

Final
9	(Czech Republic) Kristýna Plíšková	6	4	6
10	(Japan) Sachie Ishizu	3	6	4

=== Top half ===
==== Section 1 ====
First round
1	(Ukraine) Elina Svitolina	6	5	3
(United States) Grace Min	2	7	6
Q	(United Kingdom) Natalie Beazant	3	1
(Belarus) Polina Pekhova	6	6
Q	(Uzbekistan) Sabina Sharipova	1	6	7
(Norway) Ulrikke Eikeri	6	4	5
(Argentina) Agustina Sol Eskenazi	1	4
15	(Russia) Yulia Putintseva	6	6
12	(Tunisia) Ons Jabeur	6	6
(France) Caroline Garcia	2	2
(Belgium) Alison Van Uytvanck	5	6	4
(Slovakia) Jana Čepelová	7	2	6
(Japan) Emi Mutaguchi	4	6	5
WC	(United Kingdom) Francesca Stephenson	6	1	7
(Romania) Cristina Dinu	6	3	4
5	(Puerto Rico) Monica Puig	3	6	6

Second round
(United States) G Min	7	7
(Belarus) P Pekhova	5	5
Q	(Uzbekistan) S Sharipova	4	3
15	(Russia) Y Putintseva	6	6
12	(Tunisia) O Jabeur	6	2	6
(Slovakia) J Čepelová	2	6	2
WC	(United Kingdom) F Stephenson	6	3	4
5	(Puerto Rico) M Puig	1	6	6

Third round
(United States) G Min	5	0
15	(Russia) Y Putintseva	7	6
12	(Tunisia) O Jabeur	6	6
5	(Puerto Rico) M Puig	3	3

Quarterfinals
15	(Russia) Y Putintseva	7	6
12	(Tunisia) O Jabeur	5	3

==== Section 2 ====
First round
3	(Hungary) Tímea Babos	6	3	6
(Japan) Akiko Omae	3	6	4
Q	(Belarus) Aliaksandra Sasnovich	6	6
WC	(United Kingdom) Jennifer Ren	0	4
(United States) Sloane Stephens	6	6
(Chile) Cecilia Costa Melgar	1	3
(Indonesia) Grace Sari Ysidora	5	5
16	(Russia) Daria Gavrilova	7	7
9	(Czech Republic) Kristýna Plíšková	6	6
(Venezuela) Andrea Gámiz	1	3
LL	(United States) Lauren Herring	6	5	1
(Serbia) Doroteja Erić	1	7	6
(Russia) Ksenia Kirillova	3	6	6
Q	(Slovakia) Lucia Butkovská	6	4	4
WC	(United Kingdom) Eleanor Dean	3	6	6
7	(Canada) Gabriela Dabrowski	6	0	0

Second round
3	(Hungary) T Babos	6	6
Q	(Belarus) A Sasnovich	3	4
(United States) S Stephens	6	6
16	(Russia) D Gavrilova	0	4
9	(Czech Republic) Kr Plíšková	6	6
(Serbia) D Erić	2	0
(Russia) K Kirillova	4	6	4
WC	(United Kingdom) E Dean	6	0	6

Third round
3	(Hungary) T Babos	2	6	6
(United States) S Stephens	6	3	8
9	(Czech Republic) Kr Plíšková	6	6
WC	(United Kingdom) E Dean	0	2

Quarterfinals
(United States) S Stephens	6	1	7
9	(Czech Republic) Kr Plíšková	4	6	9

=== Bottom half ===
==== Section 3 ====
First round
8/WC	(United Kingdom) Laura Robson	6	6
(Japan) Risa Ozaki	0	1
(Chile) Fernanda Brito	3	0
Q	(United States) Krista Hardebeck	6	6
(Thailand) Luksika Kumkhum	3	3
WC	(Romania) Ana Bogdan	6	6
(Belarus) Ilona Kremen	1	0
11	(Belgium) An-Sophie Mestach	6	6
14	(Ukraine) Sofiya Kovalets	7^{7}	1	2
WC	(United Kingdom) Tara Moore	6^{5}	6	6
(Canada) Eugenie Bouchard	6	6
(Slovakia) Chantal Škamlová	2	1
Q	(Uzbekistan) Nigina Abduraimova	6	6
Q	(Russia) Santa Shumilina	2	3
(United States) Chanelle Van Nguyen	2	3
4	(Czech Republic) Karolína Plíšková	6	6

Second round
8/WC	(United Kingdom) L Robson	6	6
Q	(United States) K Hardebeck	0	4
WC	(Romania) A Bogdan	6^{6}	4
11	(Belgium) A-S Mestach	7^{8}	6
WC	(United Kingdom) T Moore	7^{7}	6
(Canada) E Bouchard	6^{4}	2
Q	(Uzbekistan) N Abduraimova	6	4	6
4	(Czech Republic) Ka Plíšková	2	6	3

Third round
8/WC	(United Kingdom) L Robson	6	7^{7}
11	(Belgium) A-S Mestach	4	6^{2}
WC	(United Kingdom) T Moore	6	6
Q	(Uzbekistan) N Abduraimova	1	3

Quarterfinals
8/WC	(United Kingdom) L Robson	7	6
WC	(United Kingdom) T Moore	5	1

==== Section 4 ====
First round
6	(Slovenia) Nastja Kolar	6	6
(Montenegro) Danka Kovinić	3	2
(Czech Republic) Denisa Allertová	6^{3}	6	6
(Madagascar) Zarah Razafimahatratra	7^{7}	2	4
(Serbia) Jovana Jakšić	6	6
WC	(United Kingdom) Lucy Brown	3	4
(Croatia) Silvia Njirić	4	6^{4}
10	(Japan) Sachie Ishizu	6	7^{7}
13	(Paraguay) Verónica Cepede Royg	6^{3}	7	3
Q	(France) Clothilde de Bernardi	7^{7}	5	6
(United States) Ester Goldfeld	6	6
WC	(United Kingdom) Katy Dunne	4	2
(Tunisia) Nour Abbès	5	3
(Venezuela) Adriana Pérez	7	6
(Denmark) Mai Grage	3	3
2	(Russia) Irina Khromacheva	6	6

Second round
6	(Slovenia) N Kolar	6	3	4
(Czech Republic) D Allertová	2	6	6
(Serbia) J Jakšić	6	6^{5}	4
10	(Japan) S Ishizu	4	7^{7}	6
Q	(France) C de Bernardi	6	6
(United States) E Goldfeld	4	4
(Venezuela) A Pérez	4	3
2	(Russia) I Khromacheva	6	6

Third round
(Czech Republic) D Allertová	4	6	3
10	(Japan) S Ishizu	6	2	6
Q	(France) C de Bernardi	3	3
2	(Russia) I Khromacheva	6	6

Quarterfinals
10	(Japan) S Ishizu	6	6
2	(Russia) I Khromacheva	1	2
