= 2009 Wimbledon Championships – Ladies' invitation doubles =

Ladies' invitation doubles
- 2009 Wimbledon Championships

Final
- Champions: (United States) Martina Navratilova (Czech Republic) Helena Suková
- Runners-up: (South Africa) Ilana Kloss (United States) Rosalyn Nideffer
- Score: 6–3, 6–2

Events
| Singles | men | women | | boys | girls |
| Doubles | men | women | mixed | boys | girls |
| WC Singles | men | women | quad |
| WC Doubles | men | women | quad |
| Legends | men | women | seniors |
| ← 2008 · | Wimbledon Championships | · 2010 → |

Jana Novotná and Kathy Rinaldi were the defending champions but did not compete together. Novotná competed with Andrea Temesvári and Rinaldi competed with Tracy Austin, but both paired were eliminated in the round robin.

Martina Navratilova and Helena Suková defeated Ilana Kloss and Rosalyn Nideffer in the final, 6-3, 6-2 to win the ladies' invitation doubles tennis title at the 2009 Wimbledon Championships.

== Draw ==
=== Key ===
- Q = Qualifier
- WC = Wild card
- LL = Lucky loser
- Alt = Alternate
- ITF = ITF entry
- PR = Protected ranking
- SR = Special ranking
- SE = Special exempt
- JE = Junior exempt
- JR = Junior Accelerator Programme entrant
- CO = College Accelerator Programme entrant
- NG = Next Gen Accelerator Program entrant
- w/o = Walkover
- r = Retired
- d = Defaulted

=== Final ===
| Final |
| (South Africa) Ilana Kloss (United States) Rosalyn Nideffer | 3 | 2 |
| (United States) Martina Navratilova (Czech Republic) Helena Suková | 6 | 6 |

=== Group A ===
| | (United Kingdom) Croft (United Kingdom) Smith | (South Africa) Kloss (United States) Nideffer | (Czech Republic) Novotná (Hungary) Temesvári | (United States) Magers (Spain) Martínez | RR; W–L | Set; W–L | Game; W–L | Standings |
| (United Kingdom) Annabel Croft (United Kingdom) Sam Smith | | 2–6, 5–7 | 3–6, 6–7^{(2–7)} | 1–6, 6–3, [5–10] | 0–3 | 1–6 | 23–36 | 4 |
| (South Africa) Ilana Kloss (United States) Rosalyn Nideffer | 6–2, 7–5 | | 1–6, 6–4, [10–8] | 6–2, 6–7^{(7–9)}, [10–5] | 3–0 | 6–2 | 34–26 | 1 |
| (Czech Republic) Jana Novotná (Hungary) Andrea Temesvári | 6–3, 7–6^{(7–2)} | 6–1, 4–6, [8–10] | | 6–4, 3–6, [12–10] | 2–1 | 5–3 | 33–27 | 2 |
| (United States) Gretchen Magers (Spain) Conchita Martínez | 6–1, 3–6, [10–5] | 2–6, 7–6^{(7–9)}, [5–10] | 4–6, 6–3, [10–12] | | 1–2 | 4–5 | 29–30 | 3 |

Standings are determined by: 1. number of wins; 2. number of matches; 3. in two-players-ties, head-to-head records; 4. in three-players-ties, percentage of sets won, or of games won; 5. steering-committee decision.

=== Group B ===
| | (United States) Austin (United States) Rinaldi | (United Kingdom) Durie (Australia) Mandlíková | (United States) Garrison (Australia) Smylie | (United States) Navratilova (Czech Republic) Suková | RR; W–L | Set; W–L | Game; W–L | Standings |
| (United States) Tracy Austin (United States) Kathy Rinaldi | | 6–1, 6–0 | 6–0, 6–1 | 5–7, 3–6 | 2–1 | 4–2 | 32–15 | 2 |
| (United Kingdom) Jo Durie (Australia) Hana Mandlíková | 1–6, 0–6 | | 7–5, 7–5 | 4–6, 1–6 | 1–2 | 2–4 | 20–34 | 3 |
| (United States) Zina Garrison (Australia) Elizabeth Smylie | 0–6, 1–6 | 5–7, 5–7 | | 0–6, 2–6 | 0–3 | 0–6 | 13–38 | 4 |
| (United States) Martina Navratilova (Czech Republic) Helena Suková | 7–5, 6–3 | 6–4, 6–1 | 6–0, 6–2 | | 3–0 | 6–0 | 37–15 | 1 |

Standings are determined by: 1. number of wins; 2. number of matches; 3. in two-players-ties, head-to-head records; 4. in three-players-ties, percentage of sets won, or of games won; 5. steering-committee decision.
