= 2010 Wimbledon Championships – Ladies' invitation doubles =

Ladies' invitation doubles
- 2010 Wimbledon Championships

Final
- Champions: (United States) Martina Navratilova (Czech Republic) Jana Novotná
- Runners-up: (United States) Tracy Austin (United States) Kathy Rinaldi-Stunkel
- Score: 6–3, 6–2

Events
Singles	men	women		boys	girls
Doubles	men	women	mixed	boys	girls
WC Singles	men	women	quad
WC Doubles	men	women	quad
Legends	men	women	seniors
← 2009 ·	Wimbledon Championships	· 2011 →

Martina Navratilova and Helena Suková were the defending champions but did not compete together. Suková partnered with Andrea Temesvári but they were eliminated in the round robin.

Navratilova and Jana Novotná defeated Tracy Austin and Kathy Rinaldi-Stunkel in the final, 7–5, 6–0 to win the ladies' invitation doubles tennis title at the 2010 Wimbledon Championships.

== Draw ==
=== Key ===
- Q = Qualifier
- WC = Wild card
- LL = Lucky loser
- Alt = Alternate
- ITF = ITF entry
- PR = Protected ranking
- SR = Special ranking
- SE = Special exempt
- JE = Junior exempt
- JR = Junior Accelerator Programme entrant
- CO = College Accelerator Programme entrant
- NG = Next Gen Accelerator Program entrant
- w/o = Walkover
- r = Retired
- d = Defaulted

=== Final ===
Final
(United States) Tracy Austin (United States) Kathy Rinaldi-Stunkel	5	0
(United States) Martina Navratilova (Czech Republic) Jana Novotná	7	6

=== Group A ===
	(United States) Austin (United States) Rinaldi-Stunkel	(Switzerland) Hingis (Russia) Kournikova	(United Kingdom) Hobbs (United Kingdom) Smith	(Czech Republic) Suková (Hungary) Temesvári	RR; W–L	Set; W–L	Game; W–L	Standings
(United States) Tracy Austin (United States) Kathy Rinaldi-Stunkel		7–5, 7–6^{(7–4)}	6–2, 6–1	6–4, 6–2	3-0	6-0	38-20	1
(Switzerland) Martina Hingis (Russia) Anna Kournikova	5–7, 6–7^{(4–7)}		6–2, 6–4	6–1, 6–4	2–1	4–2	35–25	2
(United Kingdom) Anne Hobbs (United Kingdom) Samantha Smith	2–6, 1–6	2–6, 4–6		5–7, 2–6	0–3	0–6	17–37	4
(Czech Republic) Helena Suková (Hungary) Andrea Temesvári	4–6, 2–6	1–6, 4–6	7–5, 6–2		1–2	2–4	24–31	3

Standings are determined by: 1. number of wins; 2. number of matches; 3. in two-players-ties, head-to-head records; 4. in three-players-ties, percentage of sets won, or of games won; 5. steering-committee decision.

=== Group B ===
	(United Kingdom) Croft (Bulgaria) Maleeva	(South Africa) Kloss (United States) Nideffer	(Spain) Martínez (France) Tauziat	(United States) Navratilova (Czech Republic) Novotná	RR; W–L	Set; W–L	Game; W–L	Standings
(United Kingdom) Annabel Croft (Bulgaria) Magdalena Maleeva		6–4, 6–1	4–6, 4–6	6–7^{(4–7)}, 2–6	1–2	2–4	28–30	3
(South Africa) Ilana Kloss (United States) Rosalyn Nideffer	4–6, 1–6		4–6, 1–6	3–6, 1–6	0–3	0–6	14–36	4
(Spain) Conchita Martínez (France) Nathalie Tauziat	6–4, 6–4	6–4, 6–1		5–7, 1–6	2–1	4–2	30–26	2
(United States) Martina Navratilova (Czech Republic) Jana Novotná	7–6^{(7–4)}, 6–2	6–3, 6–1	7–5, 6–1		3–0	6–0	38–18	1

Standings are determined by: 1. number of wins; 2. number of matches; 3. in two-players-ties, head-to-head records; 4. in three-players-ties, percentage of sets won, or of games won; 5. steering-committee decision.
