= 2009 Wimbledon Championships – Girls' doubles =

Girls' doubles
- 2009 Wimbledon Championships

Final
- Champions: (Thailand) Noppawan Lertcheewakarn (Australia) Sally Peers
- Runners-up: (France) Kristina Mladenovic (Croatia) Silvia Njirić
- Score: 6–1, 6–1

Events
Singles	men	women		boys	girls
Doubles	men	women	mixed	boys	girls
WC Singles	men	women	quad
WC Doubles	men	women	quad
Legends	men	women	seniors
- Wimbledon Championships

Polona Hercog and Jessica Moore were the defending champions but did not compete in the Juniors this year.

Noppawan Lertcheewakarn and Sally Peers defeated Kristina Mladenovic and Silvia Njirić in the final, 6–1, 6–1 to win the girls' doubles tennis title at the 2009 Wimbledon Championships.

== Seeds ==
1. (United Kingdom) Laura Robson / (United States) Sloane Stephens (withdrew)
2. (France) Kristina Mladenovic / (Croatia) Silvia Njirić (final)
3. (Hungary) Tímea Babos / (Croatia) Ajla Tomljanović (second round)
4. (Norway) Ulrikke Eikeri / (Hungary) Zsófia Susányi (second round)
5. (Russia) Daria Gavrilova / (Russia) Ksenia Kirillova (semifinals)
6. (Poland) Magda Linette / (United Kingdom) Heather Watson (second round)
7. (Netherlands) Richèl Hogenkamp / (Netherlands) Lesley Kerkhove (first round)
8. (Russia) Valeriya Solovyeva / (Ukraine) Maryna Zanevska (second round)

Laura Robson and Sloane Stephens withdrew due to a back injury for Robson.

== Draw ==
Key

- Q = Qualifier
- WC = Wild card
- LL = Lucky loser
- Alt = Alternate
- ITF = ITF entry
- PR = Protected ranking
- SR = Special ranking
- SE = Special exempt
- JE = Junior exempt
- JR = Junior Accelerator Programme entrant
- CO = College Accelerator Programme entrant
- NG = Next Gen Accelerator Program entrant
- w/o = Walkover
- r = Retired
- d = Defaulted

=== Finals ===
Semifinals
(Thailand) Noppawan Lertcheewakarn (Australia) Sally Peers	6	6
5	(Russia) Daria Gavrilova (Russia) Ksenia Kirillova	2	3
(United States) Beatrice Capra (Italy) Martina Trevisan	3	3
2	(France) Kristina Mladenovic (Croatia) Silvia Njirić	6	6

Final
(Thailand) Noppawan Lertcheewakarn (Australia) Sally Peers	6	6
2	(France) Kristina Mladenovic (Croatia) Silvia Njirić	1	1

=== Top half ===
First round
1	(United Kingdom) Laura Robson (United States) Sloane Stephens	w/o
WC	(United Kingdom) Samantha Vickers (United Kingdom) Lisa Whybourn
(Canada) Eugenie Bouchard (Mexico) Alejandra Granillo	2	1
(Slovakia) Jana Čepelová (Slovakia) Vivien Juhászová	6	6
(Japan) Emi Mutaguchi (Japan) Akiko Omae	6	6
(Thailand) Luksika Kumkhum (Thailand) Nicha Lertpitaksinchai	3	3
(Thailand) Noppawan Lertcheewakarn (Australia) Sally Peers	6	6^{2}	6
7	(Netherlands) Richèl Hogenkamp (Netherlands) Lesley Kerkhove	3	7^{7}	3
4	(Norway) Ulrikke Eikeri (Hungary) Zsófia Susányi	4	6	6
(Romania) Ana Bogdan (Denmark) Malou Ejdesgaard	6	3	1
(Oman) Fatma Al-Nabhani (Russia) Yana Buchina	7	6
Alt	(United States) Brooke Bolender (United States) Alexandra Cercone	5	3
WC	(United Kingdom) Lucy Brown (United Kingdom) Elisha Gabb	1	6^{3}
(United States) Nicole Gibbs (Chile) Camila Silva	6	7^{7}
(Thailand) Khunpak Issara (Thailand) Natchanok Saenyaukhot	2	4
5	(Russia) Daria Gavrilova (Russia) Ksenia Kirillova	6	6

Second round
WC	(United Kingdom) S Vickers (United Kingdom) L Whybourn	6^{6}	4
(Slovakia) J Čepelová (Slovakia) V Juhászová	7^{8}	6
(Japan) E Mutaguchi (Japan) A Omae	4	3
(Thailand) N Lertcheewakarn (Australia) S Peers	6	6
4	(Norway) U Eikeri (Hungary) Z Susányi	3	4
(Oman) F Al-Nabhani (Russia) Y Buchina	6	6
(United States) N Gibbs (Chile) C Silva	4	6	0
5	(Russia) D Gavrilova (Russia) K Kirillova	6	3	6

Quarterfinals
(Slovakia) J Čepelová (Slovakia) V Juhászová	6	2	1
(Thailand) N Lertcheewakarn (Australia) S Peers	4	6	6
(Oman) F Al-Nabhani (Russia) Y Buchina	3	6	2
5	(Russia) D Gavrilova (Russia) K Kirillova	6	2	6

Semifinals
(Thailand) N Lertcheewakarn (Australia) S Peers	6	6
5	(Russia) D Gavrilova (Russia) K Kirillova	2	3

=== Bottom half ===
First round
8	(Russia) Valeriya Solovyeva (Ukraine) Maryna Zanevska	6	6
(United Kingdom) Stephanie Cornish (United Kingdom) Hannah James	3	2
(United States) Beatrice Capra (Italy) Martina Trevisan	6	6
(Canada) Katarena Paliivets (South Africa) Chanel Simmonds	2	3
(Australia) Isabella Holland (United States) Christina McHale	6	6
(Hungary) Vaszilisza Bulgakova (Slovakia) Chantal Škamlová	3	4
(Serbia) Tamara Čurović (Serbia) Aleksandra Krunić	3	6	2
3	(Hungary) Tímea Babos (Croatia) Ajla Tomljanović	6	3	6
6	(Poland) Magda Linette (United Kingdom) Heather Watson	6	2	6
(Russia) Polina Leykina (Russia) Anna Arina Marenko	1	6	3
(Paraguay) Verónica Cepede Royg (Indonesia) Grace Sari Ysidora	4	1
(Japan) Miyabi Inoue (Japan) Sachie Ishizu	6	6
WC	(United Kingdom) Nicola George (United Kingdom) Jennifer Ren	2	1
(Netherlands) Quirine Lemoine (Netherlands) Angelique van der Meet	6	6
Alt	(Austria) Christina Mathis (United States) Sachia Vickery	0	0
2	(France) Kristina Mladenovic (Croatia) Silvia Njirić	6	6

Second round
8	(Russia) V Solovyeva (Ukraine) M Zanevska	6^{6}	2
(United States) B Capra (Italy) M Trevisan	7^{8}	6
(Australia) I Holland (United States) C McHale	6^{5}	6	6
3	(Hungary) T Babos (Croatia) A Tomljanović	7^{7}	2	3
6	(Poland) M Linette (United Kingdom) H Watson	6	3	4
(Japan) M Inoue (Japan) S Ishizu	2	6	6
(Netherlands) Q Lemoine (Netherlands) A van der Meet	5	6	1
2	(France) K Mladenovic (Croatia) S Njirić	7	2	6

Quarterfinals
(United States) B Capra (Italy) M Trevisan	4	6	6
(Australia) I Holland (United States) C McHale	6	4	2
(Japan) M Inoue (Japan) S Ishizu	1	3
2	(France) K Mladenovic (Croatia) S Njirić	6	6

Semifinals
(United States) B Capra (Italy) M Trevisan	3	3
2	(France) K Mladenovic (Croatia) S Njirić	6	6
