= 2009 Wimbledon Championships – Women's singles qualifying =

Women's singles qualifying
- 2009 Wimbledon Championships

Events
Singles	men	women		boys	girls
Doubles	men	women	mixed	boys	girls
WC Singles	men	women	quad
WC Doubles	men	women	quad
Legends	men	women	seniors

Qualification
Singles	men	women
Doubles	men	women
- Wimbledon Championships

Players and pairs who neither have high enough rankings nor receive wild cards may participate in a qualifying tournament held one week before the annual Wimbledon Tennis Championships.

== Seeds ==
1. (Ukraine) Viktoriya Kutuzova (qualified)
2. (United States) Varvara Lepchenko (second round)
3. (Germany) Tatjana Malek (qualified)
4. (Netherlands) Arantxa Rus (first round)
5. (Italy) Mara Santangelo (first round)
6. (France) Camille Pin (first round)
7. (Colombia) Mariana Duque Mariño (first round)
8. (Germany) Andrea Petkovic (second round)
9. (Italy) Alberta Brianti (qualified)
10. (Russia) Vitalia Diatchenko (second round)
11. (United States) Julie Ditty (first round)
12. (Latvia) Anastasija Sevastova (qualified)
13. (Russia) Evgeniya Rodina (second round)
14. (Czech Republic) Klára Zakopalová (qualified)
15. (United States) Melanie Oudin (qualified)
16. (Russia) Anna Lapushchenkova (second round)
17. (Slovenia) Polona Hercog (second round)
18. (United States) Carly Gullickson (first round)
19. (Austria) Yvonne Meusburger (second round)
20. (Germany) Angelique Kerber (second round)
21. (Estonia) Maret Ani (first round)
22. (Germany) Julia Schruff (qualifying competition)
23. (United States) Angela Haynes (second round)
24. (Slovakia) Lenka Wienerová (first round)

== Qualifiers ==
1. (Ukraine) Viktoriya Kutuzova
2. (Czech Republic) Klára Zakopalová
3. (Germany) Tatjana Malek
4. (Japan) Aiko Nakamura
5. (Spain) Arantxa Parra Santonja
6. (Kazakhstan) Sesil Karatantcheva
7. (Russia) Regina Kulikova
8. (United States) Melanie Oudin
9. (Italy) Alberta Brianti
10. (Portugal) Neuza Silva
11. (Russia) Vesna Manasieva
12. (Latvia) Anastasija Sevastova

== Lucky loser ==
1. (Slovakia) Kristína Kučová

== Qualifying draw ==
=== First qualifier ===
First round
1	(Ukraine) Viktoriya Kutuzova	3	6	6
(Greece) Anna Gerasimou	6	3	4
(United States) Lauren Albanese	7^{7}	6
(Russia) Olga Puchkova	6^{5}	1
(United States) Shenay Perry	6	6
(Chinese Taipei) Chan Chin-wei	2	3
(Spain) Estrella Cabeza Candela	1	6	0
16	(Russia) Anna Lapushchenkova	6	2	6

Second round
1	(Ukraine) Viktoriya Kutuzova	6	6
(United States) Lauren Albanese	0	4
(United States) Shenay Perry	6	6
16	(Russia) Anna Lapushchenkova	2	2

Qualifying competition
1	(Ukraine) Viktoriya Kutuzova	6	6
(United States) Shenay Perry	0	2

=== Second qualifier ===
First round
2	(United States) Varvara Lepchenko	7	6
WC	(United Kingdom) Elizabeth Thomas	5	4
(Slovakia) Lenka Tvarošková	2	2
(Bosnia and Herzegovina) Mervana Jugić-Salkić	6	6
(Japan) Tomoko Yonemura	7	6
(Lithuania) Lina Stančiūtė	5	2
(Sweden) Sofia Arvidsson	2	0
14	(Czech Republic) Klára Zakopalová	6	6

Second round
2	(United States) Varvara Lepchenko	2	3
(Bosnia and Herzegovina) Mervana Jugić-Salkić	6	6
(Japan) Tomoko Yonemura	1	1
14	(Czech Republic) Klára Zakopalová	6	6

Qualifying competition
(Bosnia and Herzegovina) Mervana Jugić-Salkić	2	1
14	(Czech Republic) Klára Zakopalová	6	6

=== Third qualifier ===
First round
3	(Germany) Tatjana Malek	6	6
(Ukraine) Julia Vakulenko	2	3
(Slovakia) Zuzana Kučová	4	6^{4}
(Australia) Anastasia Rodionova	6	7^{7}
(France) Stéphanie Cohen-Aloro	6^{2}	6^{2}
(United States) Madison Brengle	7^{7}	7^{7}
(Germany) Kathrin Wörle	7	7^{8}
21	(Estonia) Maret Ani	5	6^{6}

Second round
3	(Germany) Tatjana Malek	6	2	6
(Australia) Anastasia Rodionova	3	6	2
(United States) Madison Brengle	6	6
(Germany) Kathrin Wörle	4	3

Qualifying competition
3	(Germany) Tatjana Malek	6	6
(United States) Madison Brengle	0	3

=== Fourth qualifier ===
First round
4	(Netherlands) Arantxa Rus	6	4	0
(Czech Republic) Eva Hrdinová	2	6	6
(Russia) Nina Bratchikova	4	2
(United States) Lindsay Lee-Waters	6	6
(Japan) Aiko Nakamura	6	6
Alt	(South Africa) Natalie Grandin	4	2
(Italy) Corinna Dentoni	6	0	3
17	(Slovenia) Polona Hercog	3	6	6

Second round
(Czech Republic) Eva Hrdinová	6^{5}	4
(United States) Lindsay Lee-Waters	7^{7}	6
(Japan) Aiko Nakamura	6	7
17	(Slovenia) Polona Hercog	4	5

Qualifying competition
(United States) Lindsay Lee-Waters	3	3
(Japan) Aiko Nakamura	6	6

=== Fifth qualifier ===
First round
5	(Italy) Mara Santangelo	1	3
(Czech Republic) Renata Voráčová	6	6
(Spain) Arantxa Parra Santonja	6	3	6
(Tunisia) Selima Sfar	3	6	3
(Hungary) Gréta Arn	6	6
WC	(United Kingdom) Emily Webley-Smith	0	1
(Australia) Monique Adamczak	6	6
18	(United States) Carly Gullickson	4	4

Second round
(Czech Republic) Renata Voráčová	1	2
(Spain) Arantxa Parra Santonja	6	6
(Hungary) Gréta Arn	7^{8}	2	6
(Australia) Monique Adamczak	6^{6}	6	1

Qualifying competition
(Spain) Arantxa Parra Santonja	3	7^{7}	6
(Hungary) Gréta Arn	6	6^{4}	3

=== Sixth qualifier ===
First round
6	(France) Camille Pin	3	3
(United States) Lilia Osterloh	6	6
WC	(United Kingdom) Jade Curtis	1	3
(Kazakhstan) Sesil Karatantcheva	6	6
(Germany) Stephanie Gehrlein	0	1
(United States) Abigail Spears	6	6
(Belarus) Ekaterina Dzehalevich	1	1
23	(United States) Angela Haynes	6	6

Second round
(United States) Lilia Osterloh	2	1
(Kazakhstan) Sesil Karatantcheva	6	6
(United States) Abigail Spears	7^{7}	5	6
23	(United States) Angela Haynes	6^{4}	7	4

Qualifying competition
(Kazakhstan) Sesil Karatantcheva	6	7
(United States) Abigail Spears	3	5

=== Seventh qualifier ===
First round
7	(Colombia) Mariana Duque Mariño	4	1
(Russia) Ekaterina Bychkova	6	6
(Germany) Anne Schäfer	0	0
(Russia) Regina Kulikova	6	6
(Germany) Carmen Klaschka	6	5	2
WC	(Australia) Olivia Rogowska	1	7	6
(Belarus) Tatiana Poutchek	7^{7}	1	4
19	(Austria) Yvonne Meusburger	6^{4}	6	6

Second round
(Russia) Ekaterina Bychkova	6^{5}	2
(Russia) Regina Kulikova	7^{7}	6
WC	(Australia) Olivia Rogowska	6	1	6
19	(Austria) Yvonne Meusburger	3	6	3

Qualifying competition
(Russia) Regina Kulikova	6	6
WC	(Australia) Olivia Rogowska	1	1

=== Eighth qualifier ===
First round
8	(Germany) Andrea Petkovic	6	6
(Czech Republic) Tereza Hladíková	1	4
(Russia) Ekaterina Ivanova	2	7	5
(Slovakia) Kristína Kučová	6	5	7
(Italy) Karin Knapp	6	6
(Ukraine) Olga Savchuk	1	0
(Australia) Sophie Ferguson	6	5	3
15	(United States) Melanie Oudin	2	7	6

Second round
8	(Germany) Andrea Petkovic	7^{7}	6^{5}	4
(Slovakia) Kristína Kučová	6^{4}	7^{7}	6
(Italy) Karin Knapp	1	2
15	(United States) Melanie Oudin	6	6

Qualifying competition
(Slovakia) Kristína Kučová	3	0
15	(United States) Melanie Oudin	6	6

=== Ninth qualifier ===
First round
9	(Italy) Alberta Brianti	6	6
(Canada) Sharon Fichman	2	1
(Spain) Sílvia Soler Espinosa	6	7^{7}
(Czech Republic) Sandra Záhlavová	4	6^{5}
(Chinese Taipei) Hsieh Su-wei	w/o
(China) Yuan Meng
(Czech Republic) Zuzana Ondrášková	6	6
24	(Slovakia) Lenka Wienerová	4	0

Second round
9	(Italy) Alberta Brianti	6	6
(Spain) Sílvia Soler Espinosa	1	1
(China) Yuan Meng	2	4
(Czech Republic) Zuzana Ondrášková	6	6

Qualifying competition
9	(Italy) Alberta Brianti	6	6
(Czech Republic) Zuzana Ondrášková	4	4

=== Tenth qualifier ===
First round
10	(Russia) Vitalia Diatchenko	7^{7}	6
WC	(United Kingdom) Naomi Broady	6^{5}	4
WC	(United Kingdom) Amanda Elliot	2	3
(Portugal) Neuza Silva	6	6
(Hungary) Katalin Marosi	4	4
(Romania) Irina-Camelia Begu	6	6
(Georgia (country)) Anna Tatishvili	6^{4}	4
22	(Germany) Julia Schruff	7^{7}	6

Second round
10	(Russia) Vitalia Diatchenko	3	5
(Portugal) Neuza Silva	6	7
(Romania) Irina-Camelia Begu	2	6	5
22	(Germany) Julia Schruff	6	2	7

Qualifying competition
(Portugal) Neuza Silva	6	1	6
22	(Germany) Julia Schruff	3	6	2

=== Eleventh qualifier ===
First round
11	(United States) Julie Ditty	3	6	6
(Argentina) Jorgelina Cravero	6	1	4
WC	(Thailand) Noppawan Lertcheewakarn	7^{9}	4	1
(Russia) Vesna Manasieva	6^{7}	6	6
(Japan) Rika Fujiwara	0	3
WC	(United Kingdom) Naomi Cavaday	6	6
(Ukraine) Yuliana Fedak	4	6^{4}
20	(Germany) Angelique Kerber	6	7^{7}

Second round
(Argentina) Jorgelina Cravero	3	6^{6}
(Russia) Vesna Manasieva	6	7^{8}
WC	(United Kingdom) Naomi Cavaday	6	3	7
20	(Germany) Angelique Kerber	0	6	5

Qualifying competition
(Russia) Vesna Manasieva	7	6
WC	(United Kingdom) Naomi Cavaday	5	2

=== Twelfth qualifier ===
First round
12	(Latvia) Anastasija Sevastova	6	4	6
(South Africa) Chanelle Scheepers	0	6	3
(Portugal) Frederica Piedade	4	4
(Kyrgyzstan) Ksenia Palkina	6	6
(Belarus) Darya Kustova	6	6
(Slovenia) Andreja Klepač	2	1
(France) Youlia Fedossova	5	1
13	(Russia) Evgeniya Rodina	7	6

Second round
12	(Latvia) Anastasija Sevastova	6	6
(Kyrgyzstan) Ksenia Palkina	3	1
(Belarus) Darya Kustova	1	6	6
13	(Russia) Evgeniya Rodina	6	3	4

Qualifying competition
12	(Latvia) Anastasija Sevastova	6	6
(Belarus) Darya Kustova	0	1
