= 2009 Wimbledon Championships – Men's singles qualifying =

Men's singles qualifying
- 2009 Wimbledon Championships

Events
Singles	men	women		boys	girls
Doubles	men	women	mixed	boys	girls
WC Singles	men	women	quad
WC Doubles	men	women	quad
Legends	men	women	seniors

Qualification
Singles	men	women
Doubles	men	women
- Wimbledon Championships

Players and pairs who neither have high enough rankings nor receive wild cards may participate in a qualifying tournament held one week before the annual Wimbledon Tennis Championships.

== Seeds ==
1. (Ukraine) Sergiy Stakhovsky (first round)
2. (Germany) Simon Greul (qualified)
3. (Italy) Flavio Cipolla (second round)
4. (Croatia) Roko Karanušić (qualified)
5. (Portugal) Rui Machado (second round)
6. (Brazil) Thiago Alves (qualifying competition, lucky loser)
7. (Serbia) Ilija Bozoljac (second round)
8. (Argentina) Horacio Zeballos (second round)
9. (Thailand) Danai Udomchoke (qualifying competition, lucky loser)
10. (Germany) Daniel Brands (second round)
11. (Uruguay) Pablo Cuevas (qualifying competition, lucky loser)
12. (Russia) Mikhail Elgin (first round)
13. (France) Adrian Mannarino (qualified)
14. (India) Somdev Devvarman (first round)
15. (Poland) Łukasz Kubot (first round)
16. (United States) Jesse Levine (qualified)
17. (Belgium) Olivier Rochus (first round)
18. (Algeria) Lamine Ouahab (first round)
19. (Colombia) Santiago Giraldo (first round)
20. (Australia) Chris Guccione (first round)
21. (United States) Brendan Evans (second round)
22. (Czech Republic) Lukáš Rosol (first round)
23. (Spain) Pere Riba (second round)
24. (Slovakia) Karol Beck (qualifying competition, lucky loser)
25. (Brazil) Ricardo Hocevar (second round)
26. (France) Olivier Patience (first round)
27. (Italy) Tomas Tenconi (first round)
28. (India) Prakash Amritraj (qualifying competition)
29. (Argentina) Juan Pablo Brzezicki (second round)
30. (France) Alexandre Sidorenko (first round)
31. (Slovakia) Dominik Hrbatý (second round)
32. (United States) Donald Young (first round)

== Qualifiers ==
1. (United States) Rajeev Ram
2. (Germany) Simon Greul
3. (Belgium) Xavier Malisse
4. (Croatia) Roko Karanušić
5. (Slovakia) Lukáš Lacko
6. (Austria) Alexander Peya
7. (Colombia) Alejandro Falla
8. (France) Édouard Roger-Vasselin
9. (Slovenia) Grega Žemlja
10. (Mexico) Santiago González
11. (United States) Taylor Dent
12. (Italy) Riccardo Ghedin
13. (France) Adrian Mannarino
14. (Slovenia) Luka Gregorc
15. (United States) Michael Yani
16. (United States) Jesse Levine

== Lucky losers ==
1. (Slovakia) Karol Beck
2. (Brazil) Thiago Alves
3. (Thailand) Danai Udomchoke
4. (Uruguay) Pablo Cuevas

== Qualifying draw ==
=== First qualifier ===
First round
1	(Ukraine) Sergiy Stakhovsky	6	3	3
(Italy) Andrea Stoppini	2	6	6
WC	(United Kingdom) Marcus Willis	7^{9}	7^{8}
(United States) Amer Delic	6^{7}	6^{6}
(United States) Sam Warburg	7^{7}	7
(Romania) Adrian Ungur	6^{4}	5
(United States) Rajeev Ram	6	7^{7}
18	(Algeria) Lamine Ouahab	4	6^{0}

Second round
(Italy) Andrea Stoppini	6	6
WC	(United Kingdom) Marcus Willis	2	4
(United States) Sam Warburg	3	2
(United States) Rajeev Ram	6	6

Qualifying competition
(Italy) Andrea Stoppini	4	2	4
(United States) Rajeev Ram	6	6	6

=== Second qualifier ===
First round
2	(Germany) Simon Greul	7^{7}	6
(South Africa) Kevin Anderson	6^{3}	1
(Germany) Dominik Meffert	7	6
(Italy) Stefano Galvani	5	4
(Brazil) Franco Ferreiro	6	6
(Venezuela) José de Armas	4	1
(South Korea) Im Kyu-tae	3	2
24	(Slovakia) Karol Beck	6	6

Second round
2	(Germany) Simon Greul	6	7
(Germany) Dominik Meffert	4	5
(Brazil) Franco Ferreiro	5	7^{7}	2
24	(Slovakia) Karol Beck	7	6^{3}	6

Qualifying competition
2	(Germany) Simon Greul	5	7^{8}	6	7^{7}
24	(Slovakia) Karol Beck	7	6^{6}	2	6^{5}

=== Third qualifier ===
First round
3	(Italy) Flavio Cipolla	6	7^{7}
(Spain) David Marrero	2	6^{1}
(Spain) Daniel Muñoz de la Nava	7	5	6
(Brazil) Ricardo Mello	5	7	3
(South Africa) Rik de Voest	6^{3}	6^{6}
(Belgium) Xavier Malisse	7^{7}	7^{8}
(Israel) Harel Levy	5	7^{7}	6
20	(Australia) Chris Guccione	7	6^{0}	3

Second round
3	(Italy) Flavio Cipolla	6^{6}	7	6
(Spain) Daniel Muñoz de la Nava	7^{8}	5	8
(Belgium) Xavier Malisse	6	3	6
(Israel) Harel Levy	0	6	3

Qualifying competition
(Spain) Daniel Muñoz de la Nava	3	6^{2}	0
(Belgium) Xavier Malisse	6	7^{7}	6

=== Fourth qualifier ===
First round
4	(Croatia) Roko Karanušić	6	7^{7}
(Germany) Julian Reister	2	6^{5}
WC	(United Kingdom) Alexander Slabinsky	6	6
(Romania) Adrian Cruciat	4	4
(Turkey) Marsel İlhan	6^{5}	6	4
(Denmark) Kristian Pless	7^{7}	4	6
(Austria) Martin Fischer	6	3	6
19	(Colombia) Santiago Giraldo	3	6	3

Second round
4	(Croatia) Roko Karanušić	7^{7}	6
WC	(United Kingdom) Alexander Slabinsky	6^{4}	1
(Denmark) Kristian Pless	2	4
(Austria) Martin Fischer	6	6

Qualifying competition
4	(Croatia) Roko Karanušić	6	6	4	6
(Austria) Martin Fischer	2	4	6	3

=== Fifth qualifier ===
First round
5	(Portugal) Rui Machado	6	6
(Italy) Giancarlo Petrazzuolo	1	4
(Slovakia) Lukáš Lacko	1	6	6
(United States) Ryan Sweeting	6	3	4
(Argentina) Juan-Pablo Amado	2	2
(Brazil) Caio Zampieri	6	6
(Italy) Paolo Lorenzi	6^{3}	6	4
25	(Brazil) Ricardo Hocevar	7^{7}	3	6

Second round
5	(Portugal) Rui Machado	6	2	6
(Slovakia) Lukáš Lacko	1	6	8
(Brazil) Caio Zampieri	6	6
25	(Brazil) Ricardo Hocevar	4	4

Qualifying competition
(Slovakia) Lukáš Lacko	6	6	6
(Brazil) Caio Zampieri	2	4	2

=== Sixth qualifier ===
First round
6	(Brazil) Thiago Alves	7	4	6
(Brazil) Rogério Dutra Silva	5	6	3
(Germany) Tobias Kamke	7	1
(Romania) Gabriel Moraru	5	0^{r}
(Brazil) João Souza	4	6	2
(Austria) Alexander Peya	6	4	6
WC	(United Kingdom) Joshua Milton	2	7^{7}	6
30	(France) Alexandre Sidorenko	6	6^{4}	1

Second round
6	(Brazil) Thiago Alves	6	7
(Germany) Tobias Kamke	4	5
(Austria) Alexander Peya	6	6
WC	(United Kingdom) Joshua Milton	4	4

Qualifying competition
6	(Brazil) Thiago Alves	6^{4}	1	1
(Austria) Alexander Peya	7^{7}	6	6

=== Seventh qualifier ===
First round
7	(Serbia) Ilija Bozoljac	6	6^{11}	6
(Czech Republic) Jiří Vaněk	1	7^{13}	4
(Spain) Fernando Vicente	3	1
(France) Sébastien de Chaunac	6	6
WC	(United Kingdom) Daniel Smethurst	6^{4}	4
(Switzerland) Marco Chiudinelli	7^{7}	6
(Colombia) Alejandro Falla	6	6
32	(United States) Donald Young	4	4

Second round
7	(Serbia) Ilija Bozoljac	3	6^{3}
(France) Sébastien de Chaunac	6	7^{7}
(Switzerland) Marco Chiudinelli	6	4	13
(Colombia) Alejandro Falla	4	6	15

Qualifying competition
(France) Sébastien de Chaunac	4	4	4
(Colombia) Alejandro Falla	6	6	6

=== Eighth qualifier ===
First round
8	(Argentina) Horacio Zeballos	6	7^{7}
(Netherlands) Michel Koning	4	6^{4}
(United States) Scoville Jenkins	7^{7}	3	0
(France) Édouard Roger-Vasselin	6^{4}	6	6
WC	(Australia) Bernard Tomic	7^{7}	7^{7}
(United States) Alex Bogomolov Jr.	6^{5}	6^{1}
(Argentina) Diego Álvarez	3	2
29	(Argentina) Juan Pablo Brzezicki	6	6

Second round
8	(Argentina) Horacio Zeballos	6^{4}	3
(France) Édouard Roger-Vasselin	7^{7}	6
WC	(Australia) Bernard Tomic	6	6
29	(Argentina) Juan Pablo Brzezicki	3	3

Qualifying competition
(France) Édouard Roger-Vasselin	7^{7}	6	6
WC	(Australia) Bernard Tomic	6^{1}	4	0

=== Ninth qualifier ===
First round
9	(Thailand) Danai Udomchoke	6	6
(Denmark) Frederik Nielsen	4	4
(Croatia) Ivan Dodig	4	4
(Austria) Andreas Haider-Maurer	6	6
(Slovenia) Grega Žemlja	6	6
(Dominican Republic) Víctor Estrella Burgos	4	2
(Ukraine) Sergei Bubka	6	7
22	(Czech Republic) Lukáš Rosol	4	5

Second round
9	(Thailand) Danai Udomchoke	4	6	8
(Austria) Andreas Haider-Maurer	6	4	6
(Slovenia) Grega Žemlja	6	6^{4}	6
(Ukraine) Sergei Bubka	3	7^{7}	4

Qualifying competition
9	(Thailand) Danai Udomchoke	4	6^{4}	4
(Slovenia) Grega Žemlja	6	7^{7}	6

=== Tenth qualifier ===
First round
10	(Germany) Daniel Brands	6	6
(Sweden) Björn Rehnquist	3	2
(Spain) Carles Poch Gradin	6^{9}	4
(Belgium) Ruben Bemelmans	7^{11}	6
(Ecuador) Giovanni Lapentti	6^{5}	6	3
(Mexico) Santiago González	7^{7}	4	6
(Switzerland) Michael Lammer	6^{3}	6	4
31	(Slovakia) Dominik Hrbatý	7^{7}	4	6

Second round
10	(Germany) Daniel Brands	3	6^{3}
(Belgium) Ruben Bemelmans	6	7^{7}
(Mexico) Santiago González	6	6
31	(Slovakia) Dominik Hrbatý	4	4

Qualifying competition
(Belgium) Ruben Bemelmans	3	3	6^{8}
(Mexico) Santiago González	6	6	7^{10}

=== Eleventh qualifier ===
First round
11	(Uruguay) Pablo Cuevas	2	6	6
(Argentina) Sebastián Decoud	6	2	4
(Uruguay) Marcel Felder	2	3
PR	(United States) Ryler DeHeart	6	6
(Australia) Peter Luczak	6	6
(Czech Republic) Jaroslav Pospíšil	3	2
WC	(United States) Taylor Dent	6	6^{2}	6
17	(Belgium) Olivier Rochus	4	7^{7}	4

Second round
11	(Uruguay) Pablo Cuevas	6	5	6
PR	(United States) Ryler DeHeart	2	7	4
(Australia) Peter Luczak	6^{4}	3
WC	(United States) Taylor Dent	7^{7}	6

Qualifying competition
11	(Uruguay) Pablo Cuevas	3	5	7^{9}	3
WC	(United States) Taylor Dent	6	7	6^{7}	6

=== Twelfth qualifier ===
First round
12	(Russia) Mikhail Elgin	5	4
(Russia) Alexander Kudryavtsev	7	6
(South Africa) Izak van der Merwe	2^{r}
(Italy) Riccardo Ghedin	5
(Italy) Marco Crugnola	6	2	7
(Ukraine) Illya Marchenko	3	6	5
(Slovakia) Kamil Čapkovič	3	1
23	(Spain) Pere Riba	6	6

Second round
(Russia) Alexander Kudryavtsev	7	6^{3}	2
(Italy) Riccardo Ghedin	5	7^{7}	6
(Italy) Marco Crugnola	7^{7}	6
23	(Spain) Pere Riba	6^{3}	3

Qualifying competition
(Italy) Riccardo Ghedin	7^{8}	6	6
(Italy) Marco Crugnola	6^{6}	3	1

=== Thirteenth qualifier ===
First round
13	(France) Adrian Mannarino	7^{8}	6
PR	(Mexico) Bruno Echagaray	6^{6}	3
WC	(United Kingdom) Chris Eaton	4	2
(France) Stéphane Robert	6	6
(Slovenia) Blaž Kavčič	3	6	6
(Australia) Robert Smeets	6	1	4
(Switzerland) Stéphane Bohli	7	4	6
26	(France) Olivier Patience	5	6	4

Second round
13	(France) Adrian Mannarino	2	6	6
(France) Stéphane Robert	6	3	4
(Slovenia) Blaž Kavčič	6	6
(Switzerland) Stéphane Bohli	4	4

Qualifying competition
13	(France) Adrian Mannarino	6	6	7^{8}
(Slovenia) Blaž Kavčič	2	3	6^{6}

=== Fourteenth qualifier ===
First round
14	(India) Somdev Devvarman	3	2
(Monaco) Jean-René Lisnard	6	6
(Australia) Joseph Sirianni	6	3	6
(Czech Republic) Pavel Šnobel	4	6	1
(Brazil) André Miele	4	4
(Slovenia) Luka Gregorc	6	6
(Australia) Marinko Matosevic	4	2
21	(United States) Brendan Evans	6	6

Second round
(Monaco) Jean-René Lisnard	4	4
(Australia) Joseph Sirianni	6	6
(Slovenia) Luka Gregorc	6	0	16
21	(United States) Brendan Evans	4	6	14

Qualifying competition
(Australia) Joseph Sirianni	4	4	5
(Slovenia) Luka Gregorc	6	6	7

=== Fifteenth qualifier ===
First round
15	(Poland) Łukasz Kubot	4	6	9
(Japan) Go Soeda	6	3	11
(United States) Michael Yani	6	6
(Spain) Marc López	1	1
(Republic of Ireland) Conor Niland	3	6	6
WC	(United Kingdom) Daniel Cox	6	1	8
(Croatia) Antonio Veić	3	4
28	(India) Prakash Amritraj	6	6

Second round
(Japan) Go Soeda	2	6^{5}
(United States) Michael Yani	6	7^{7}
WC	(United Kingdom) Daniel Cox	3	3
28	(India) Prakash Amritraj	6	6

Qualifying competition
(United States) Michael Yani	3	7	6	6
28	(India) Prakash Amritraj	6	5	3	4

=== Sixteenth qualifier ===
First round
16	(United States) Jesse Levine	6	6^{3}	7
(Australia) Sam Groth	4	7^{7}	5
(Germany) Dieter Kindlmann	6	6
WC	(United Kingdom) Richard Bloomfield	4	0
(Germany) Matthias Bachinger	6	6
(United States) Todd Widom	3	3
(Germany) Alexander Flock	1	6	9
27	(Italy) Tomas Tenconi	6	4	7

Second round
16	(United States) Jesse Levine	6	6
(Germany) Dieter Kindlmann	2	3
(Germany) Matthias Bachinger	6	7
(Germany) Alexander Flock	3	5

Qualifying competition
16	(United States) Jesse Levine	6	7	6
(Germany) Matthias Bachinger	2	5	2
