= Cavaday =

Cavaday is a surname. Notable people with the surname include:

- Naomi Cavaday (born 1989), British tennis player and coach
- Nick Cavaday (born 1986), British tennis player and coach
