= Nick Cavaday =

English tennis coach (born 1986)

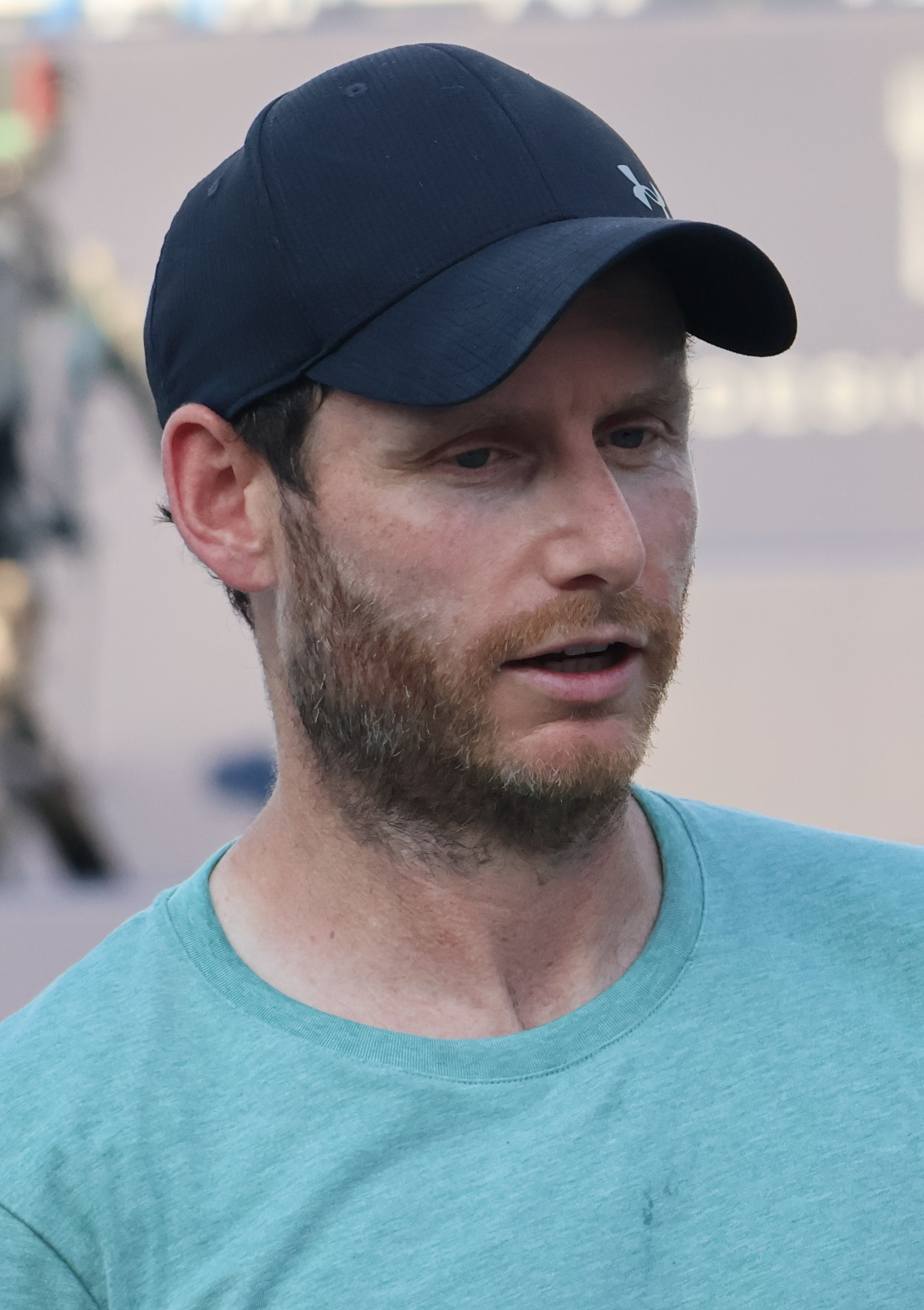
- Cavaday at the 2024 Washington Open
- Born: 14 May 1986 (age 38); London, England
- College: North Carolina State University

Singles
- Highest ranking: 1,022 (14 September 2009)

Doubles
- Highest ranking: 991 (19 April 2010)

Coaching career (2011–)
- Dom Inglot and Robert Lindstedt (2015–16); Aljaz Bedene (2016–18); Ranah Stoiber (2023); Emma Raducanu (2024–2025)
- Last updated on: 13 June 2024.

Nick Cavaday (born 14 May 1986) is an English former tennis player turned coach. He has coached Emma Raducanu as well as guiding Dom Inglot and Robert Lindstedt to the US Open men's doubles semi-finals.

== Playing career ==
Cavaday played US collegiate tennis for North Carolina State University, amassing a 74-56 singles record and 74–53 in doubles, while studying for a degree in psychology.

After finishing university, he turned professional and played regularly on the ITF Tour reaching a career-high of 1,022 in the ATP singles rankings, with his last match being in 2010.

== Coaching career ==
Cavaday began coaching in 2011. He was head coach at the LTA High Performance Centre in Bromley from 2011 to 2014.

Moving into working with individual players, he coached Dom Inglot and Robert Lindstedt over the next two years, during which time they reached the men's doubles semi-finals at the 2015 US Open.

Cavaday coached Aljaz Bedene from 2016 to 2018, helping him reach a career high ranking of world number 43.

He was appointed head coach at the LTA's newly created Loughborough Academy in October 2018, a post he held until April 2023 when he became coach of Ranah Stoiber.

Cavaday began informally working with 2021 US Open champion, Emma Raducanu, who he has known since she was 10-years-old, in December 2023, before being officially confirmed as her coach the following month in the build-up to the 2024 Australian Open.

It was announced on 24 January 2025, that Cavaday and Raducanu had ended their partnership due to issues with his health.

== Personal life ==
Cavaday's sister Naomi is a former tennis player who now commentates on the sport on television and radio.
