= Naomi Cavaday =

British tennis player (born 1989)

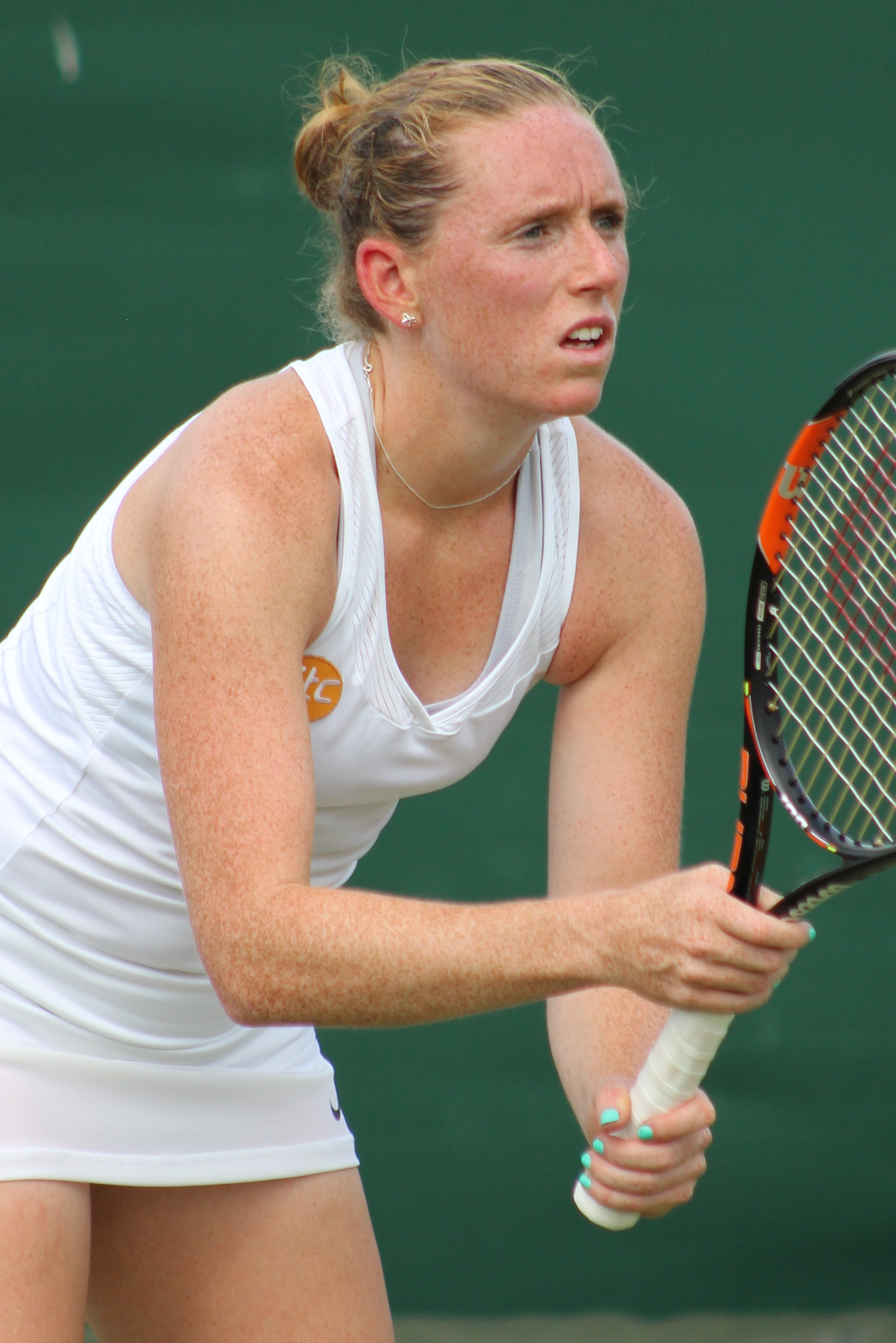
- Cavaday at the 2015 Wimbledon Championships
- Country (sports): United Kingdom
- Residence: Chislehurst, London
- Born: 24 April 1989 (age 37) Sidcup, London
- Height: 1.70 m (5 ft 7 in)
- Turned pro: 2005
- Retired: 2015
- Plays: Left (two-handed backhand)
- Prize money: $213,061

Singles
- Career record: 208–128
- Career titles: 6 ITF
- Highest ranking: No. 174 (10 May 2010)

Grand Slam singles results
- Australian Open: Q2 (2010)
- French Open: Q1 (2008)
- Wimbledon: 1R (2006, 2007, 2008)
- US Open: Q3 (2007)

Doubles
- Career record: 54–60
- Career titles: 2 ITF
- Highest ranking: No. 184 (5 April 2010)

Grand Slam doubles results
- Wimbledon: 1R (2007, 2008, 2009, 2010)

Naomi Kathleen Cavaday (born 24 April 1989) is a British former professional tennis player from Sidcup, London. She retired in April 2011 to take up a coaching role with the Lawn Tennis Association. At the time of her retirement, she was the British No. 6, with a ranking of world No. 231. Her career-high ranking was 174, achieved in May 2010. She won three ITF singles titles and two ITF doubles titles. Her coach at retirement was Rob Smith. She was formerly coached by David Felgate, the long-time coach of Tim Henman.

In 2014, Cavaday returned to professional tennis, regained a world ranking, and won three additional ITF titles. She finally retired in 2015 and has since worked as a coach and as a commentator for BBC Radio 5 Live's Wimbledon coverage and on Amazon Prime.

== Personal life ==
Cavaday was born in suburban south-east London. Her mother is a sport psychologist and her brother has played tennis at county level and in America for North Carolina State University. Up to the age of 13 years Cavaday studied at Bromley High School before getting a tennis scholarship to Queenswood School in Hertfordshire. She has also studied at the highly prestigious Nick Bollettieri Tennis Academy in Florida. Cavaday took a course in journalism and creative writing and expressed an interest in becoming a sports journalist when her tennis career was over. She appeared as a guest on the Al Jazeera English programme The Stream in July 2015, as part of a discussion on issues of female body image and its impact on sportswomen regarding their physiques.

Cavaday became an ambassador for Beat, the eating disorder charity, in 2011 and as of 2016 is a mental health ambassador for the LTA.

In July 2019, Cavaday got married and in November 2020, Cavaday and her husband gave birth to a baby boy .

Cavaday's brother Nick is a tennis coach and previously worked with Emma Raducanu.

== Career ==
=== Junior (2004–2007) ===
Cavaday competed on the ITF Junior Circuit from May 2004 to July 2007. She was a quarterfinalist at a total of nine tournaments, one of which was the 2006 Wimbledon girls' championships where she lost to Urszula Radwańska, 3–6, 2–6. She reached the semifinals of the ITF Junior Cup Copenhagen, Danish ITF Junior Tournament and the Optus Nottinghill International and was a finalist in the Malta ITF Junior Tournament, Safina Cup, French Riviera International Junior Open and the Tournoi International Juniors de Beaulieu sur Mer. She won one junior singles title at the Istres International Junior Tournament in April 2006 where she also won her only junior doubles title in the same year. Her best result at the Australian Open junior tournament was a first round defeat at the hands of Alizé Cornet, 1–6, 6–7^{(5)}, in 2007. She participated in the French Open and US Open junior Grand Slam events only once, losing in the second round of qualifying for the French and the second round of the main draw of the US Open where she lost Tamira Paszek, 6–4, 4–6, 0–6.

Her career-high junior combined ranking was world No. 23 (achieved 19 March 2007) and her win–loss records for her junior career were 55–21 in singles and 28–19 in doubles.

=== 2005–2006 ===
Cavaday made her debut on the ITF Women's Circuit in January 2005 and in only the fourth professional tournament of her career she qualified and beat Isha Lakhani, 6–4, 6–1, in the final to win the event. Nevertheless, she finished 2005 without a world ranking.

In January 2006, Cavaday qualified for and reached the semifinal of the Tipton $10k event and at the start of February she competed in her first ever $25k event in Jersey where she was beaten, 4–6, 1–6, by Anne Keothavong in round one. One month later, Cavaday qualified for Sunderland $10k and reached the final where she was defeated by Gaëlle Widmer in three sets, 1–6, 6–3, 1–6. This was immediately followed by a quarterfinal appearance in the $10k in Sheffield and a semifinal appearance in another $10k event, this one in Bath, where she lost to up-and-comer Urszula Radwańska, 6–7^{(1)}, 3–6. In her very next tournament, she yet again lost in the semifinal before receiving a wildcard into the Tier III Birmingham Classic qualifying draw. She won one tough three set match against Tatiana Poutchek, 7–6^{(5)}, 3–6, 7–6^{(6)}, before losing another to Hungarian Melinda Czink, in a close three-setter. This was followed by Cavaday's first ever Grand Slam main-draw appearance, courtesy of a wildcard into home Grand Slam Wimbledon. She played Japanese veteran Ai Sugiyama and lost in straight sets. During September and October, Cavaday played in one $10k tournament (where she lost in the quarterfinal) and three $25k tournaments where she reached the semifinals, quarterfinals and second round. She rounded off her 2006 season in Australia with three more $25k tournaments in Mount Gambier, Port Pirie and Nurioopta where she reached the quarterfinal of the first tournament and the first round of the other two. Her year-end ranking of 2006 was 401.

=== 2007 ===
During January and February of 2007, Cavaday competed in two $25k events in Great Britain and reached the quarterfinals of one of them. She then headed to the U.S. in March where she won eight consecutive matches to qualify for and win the $25k in Orange, California. In April she reached the quarterfinal stage in another $25k tournament, this one in Jackson, Mississippi. She reached the semifinal of Palm Beach $25k in May before heading back to England and playing in the main draw of the Tier III Birmingham Classic courtesy of a wildcard where she beat Vasilisa Bardina, 6–2, 6–1, in round one. She was then demolished by Marion Bartoli, 6–3, 6–1, in the second round. She was immediately given a wildcard into the qualifying draw of the International Women's Open, a Tier II tournament held in Eastbourne, England. She was beaten in a tight two set match by Youlia Fedossova, in two tiebreakers, in the first round. A third consecutive wildcard allowed Cavaday entry into the main draw of Wimbledon for the second year running where she was drawn to face a resurgent former multiple Grand Slam champion in the form of Martina Hingis on Court 2, the "Graveyard of Champions". The court almost held true to its name when Cavaday had match points in the second set but failed to convert them, eventually losing 7–6^{(1)}, 5–7, 0–6.

After Wimbledon, Cavaday played one more tournament on grass, the $25k Felixstowe (where she reached the quarterfinal), before heading to the U.S. in preparation for the US Open qualifying tournament. She was given a wildcard into the qualifying draw for the Tier II event New Haven Open where she fell just short of qualifying, losing to Tatiana Poutchek in three sets in the final round. She then headed to the US Open qualifying for the first time in her career where she also lost in the final round of qualifying in three sets, this time to German Sandra Klösel. After this, her ranking was high enough to enter her into qualifying for the Tier III Sunfeast Open on merit. She won two matches to qualify before falling in the first round to Ekaterina Ivanova, 3–6, 6–2, 2–6. This was then followed immediately by Cavaday attempting to qualify for the Tier IV Korea Open but again losing one match short of qualifying for the main draw. At the end of the 2007 season, she played four more $25k events (reaching the quarterfinal of one, the semifinal of another and round two in the other two). She then attempted to qualify for the Auckland Open, a Tier IV event in Auckland, where she lost to Ahsha Rolle in the final round. Her year-end ranking was world No. 196.

=== 2008 ===
From the start of 2008 until the French Open, Cavaday competed primarily in $50k and $75k events. She reached the semifinal of New Delhi $50k (losing to Yanina Wickmayer in straight sets) and the quarterfinals of Patras $50k and Monzon $75k. In May, she competed in the qualifying tournament of the French Open for the first time in her career but lost, 3–6, 5–7, in the first round to Stefanie Vögele. In June she received another wildcard into the Tier III DFS Classic where she dominated Jill Craybas with her tricky serve and impressive forehand in the first round to win 6–0, 6–4 before going on to lose in the second round to Indian Sunitha Rao, in three sets. Compatriot Elena Baltacha then beat her in the opening round of qualifying for the Tier II International Women's Open in Eastbourne in straight sets, 6–2, 6–4. Another wildcard granted Cavaday access to the main draw of Wimbledon for the third year running where she was drawn to face defending champion and 12-time Grand Slam finalist, Venus Williams. She led Williams in the first set but eventually lost, 6–7^{(5)}, 1–6, in a match which led Williams to suggest that Cavaday could go far in the game with coaching from her father Richard Williams.

Following Wimbledon, Cavaday hit a patch of bad form, winning only two of her next six matches including losing in round one of qualifying for the US Open to Kristína Kučová. Following this, Cavaday did not play any more matches in 2008 due to a viral infection which saw her unable to train properly for the next three months and struggling to climb flights of stairs. It was the first serious setback Cavaday had been faced with in her young career but she gradually recovered and began light training once again in November in preparation for the 2009 season. She said of the setback, "As an athlete it was very worrying". Her worldwide ranking at the end of 2008 had fallen to No.268.

=== 2009 ===
In her first event since the 2008 US Open qualifying, Cavaday entered Wrexham $10k in January as a wildcard and the No. 2 seed. She reached the semifinal before being overcome by fifth seed Claudine Schaul from Luxembourg, 6–2, 6–0. The very next week, she reached the quarterfinal of the $25k tournament in Sutton, before falling to compatriot Katie O'Brien, 1–6, 1–6. She then entered the $25k event in Stockholm where she was beaten by Tatjana Malek, 2–6, 1–6, in the semifinals. At the 2009 WTA International in Birmingham she received a wildcard, and overcame Julie Ditty and 12th seed Tamarine Tanasugarn to reach the third round.

=== 2014: Return to professional tennis ===
In 2014, Cavaday returned to professional tennis, receiving a wildcard into the $50k grass-court tournament in Nottingham, England. Further tournaments in England and in Egypt followed, and in September 2014, she won the first title of her comeback at a $10k tournament in Sharm El Sheikh, Egypt, defeating top seed Barbara Haas at the quarterfinal stage, and second seed Ana Veselinović in the final. In consecutive weeks in October – November 2014, she won back-to-back $10k titles in Stockholm, Sweden., beating Tayisiya Morderger in the first week's final and Margarita Lazareva in the second final.

=== 2015 ===
Cavaday was restricted by a wrist injury in the first half of the year and played only three matches. On 7 October 2015, she posted on her website that she would no longer be competing professionally.

== ITF Circuit finals ==
=== Singles (6–2) ===
Legend $25,000 tournaments $10,000 tournaments	Finals by surface Hard (5–2) Clay (1–0)

Result	W–L	Date	Tournament	Tier	Surface	Opponent	Score
Win	1–0	6 November 2005	ITF Pune, India	10,000	Hard	(India) Isha Lakhani	6–4, 6–1
Loss	1–1	12 March 2006	ITF Sunderland, UK	10,000	Hard	(Switzerland) Gaëlle Widmer	1–6, 6–3, 1–6
Win	2–1	18 March 2007	ITF Orange, United States	25,000	Hard	(Italy) Karin Knapp	6–1, 6–1
Win	3–1	3 May 2010	ITF Brescia, Italy	25,000	Clay	(Czech Republic) Andrea Hlaváčková	6–2, 6–4
Loss	3–2	14 September 2010	ITF Darwin, Australia	25,000	Hard	(Australia) Olivia Rogowska	2–6, 6–2, 0–6
Win	4–2	28 September 2014	ITF Sharm El Sheikh, Egypt	10,000	Hard	(Montenegro) Ana Veselinovic	6–4, 6–4
Win	5–2	26 October 2014	ITF Stockholm, Sweden	10,000	Hard (i)	(Germany) Tayisiya Morderger	7–6^{(7–3)}, 6–4
Win	6–2	2 November 2014	ITF Stockholm, Sweden	10,000	Hard (i)	(Russia) Margarita Lazareva	5–7, 6–3, 6–3

=== Doubles (2–4) ===
Legend $50,000 tournaments $25,000 tournaments $10,000 tournaments	Finals by surface Hard (1–2) Clay (1–1) Grass (0–1)

Result	No.	Date	Tournament	Surface	Partnering	Opponents	Score
Loss	1	28 May 2006	ITF Budapest, Hungary	Clay	(United Kingdom) Georgie Gent	(Romania) Antonia Xenia Tout (Serbia) Nataša Zorić	1–6, 2–6
Loss	2	23 September 2006	ITF Nottingham, UK	Hard	(United Kingdom) Claire Peterzen	(United Kingdom) Georgie Gent (United Kingdom) Emily Webley-Smith	6–3, 5–7, 4–6
Loss	3	8 June 2007	Surbiton Trophy, UK	Grass	(United Kingdom) Elena Baltacha	(United Kingdom) Karen Paterson (United Kingdom) Melanie South	1–6, 4–6
Win	4	3 March 2009	Soweto Open, South Africa	Hard	(Ukraine) Lesia Tsurenko	(Slovakia) Kristína Kučová (Latvia) Anastasija Sevastova	6–2, 2–6, [11–9]
Loss	5	6 February 2010	ITF Sutton, UK	Hard	(United Kingdom) Anna Smith	(Greece) Irini Georgatou (Russia) Valeria Savinykh	5–7, 6–2, [8–10]
Win	6	3 May 2010	ITF Brescia, Italy	Clay	(Russia) Anastasia Pivovarova	(France) Iryna Brémond (Russia) Valeria Savinykh	6–3, 6–7^{(5)}, [10–8]

== Performance timelines ==
Key
W	F	SF	QF	#R	RR	Q#	P#	DNQ	A	Z#	PO	G	S	B	NMS	NTI	P	NH

(W) winner; (F) finalist; (SF) semifinalist; (QF) quarterfinalist; (#R) rounds 4, 3, 2, 1; (RR) round-robin stage; (Q#) qualification round; (P#) preliminary round; (DNQ) did not qualify; (A) absent; (Z#) Davis/Fed Cup Zonal Group (with number indication) or (PO) play-off; (G) gold, (S) silver or (B) bronze Olympic/Paralympic medal; (NMS) not a Masters tournament; (NTI) not a Tier I tournament; (P) postponed; (NH) not held; (SR) strike rate (events won / competed); (W–L) win–loss record.
To avoid confusion and double counting, these charts are updated at the conclusion of a tournament or when the player's participation has ended.

=== Singles ===
Tournament	2006	2007	2008	2009	2010	2011	2014	2015	Career W–L
Australian Open	A	A	A	A	Q2	A	A	A	0–0
French Open	A	A	Q1	A	Q1	A	A	A	0–0
Wimbledon	1R	1R	1R	Q3	Q2	A	A	Q1	0–3
US Open	A	Q3	Q1	A	Q1	A	A	A	0–0
Year-end ranking	401	196	268	203	213	670	606	502	N/A

=== Doubles ===
Tournament	2007	2008	2009	2010	Career W–L
Australian Open	A	A	A	A	0–0
French Open	A	A	A	A	0–0
Wimbledon	1R	1R	1R	1R	0–4
US Open	A	A	A	A	0–0
Year-end ranking	425	748	246	277	N/A

=== Mixed doubles ===
Tournament	2009	Career W–L
Australian Open	A	0–0
French Open	A	0–0
Wimbledon	1R	0–1
US Open	A	0–0

=== Fed Cup ===
Europe/Africa Group I
Date	Venue	Surface	Round	Opponents	Final match score	Match	Opponent	Rubber score
19–21 April 2007	Plovdiv	Clay	RR	Luxembourg	1–2	Singles	Mandy Minella	6–4, 6–7^{(2)}, 4–6
19–21 April 2007	Plovdiv	Clay	RR	Poland	0–3	Singles	Agnieszka Radwańska	3–6, 2–6
19–21 April 2007	Plovdiv	Clay	PO (9th–12th)	Sweden	1–2	Singles	Johanna Larsson	2–6, 6–1, 1–6
