= 2009 Wimbledon Championships – Mixed doubles =

Mixed doubles
- 2009 Wimbledon Championships

Final
- Champions: (The Bahamas) Mark Knowles (Germany) Anna-Lena Grönefeld
- Runners-up: (India) Leander Paes (Zimbabwe) Cara Black
- Score: 7–5, 6–3

Details
- Draw: 48 (5 WC )
- Seeds: 16

Events
Singles	men	women		boys	girls
Doubles	men	women	mixed	boys	girls
WC Singles	men	women	quad
WC Doubles	men	women	quad
Legends	men	women	seniors
← 2008 ·	Wimbledon Championships	· 2010 →

Bob Bryan and Samantha Stosur were the defending champions but lost in the quarterfinals to Mark Knowles and Anna-Lena Grönefeld.

Knowles and Grönefeld defeated Leander Paes and Cara Black in the final, 7–5, 6–3 to win the mixed doubles tennis title at the 2009 Wimbledon Championships.

== Seeds ==
All seeds received a bye into the second round.

1. (India) Leander Paes / (Zimbabwe) Cara Black (final)
2. (United States) Bob Bryan / (Australia) Samantha Stosur (quarterfinals)
3. (Poland) Marcin Matkowski / (United States) Lisa Raymond (third round)
4. (Zimbabwe) Kevin Ullyett / (Chinese Taipei) Hsieh Su-wei (quarterfinals)
5. (Canada) Daniel Nestor / (Russia) Elena Vesnina (third round)
6. (United States) Mike Bryan / (United States) Bethanie Mattek-Sands (third round)
7. (Sweden) Robert Lindstedt / (Australia) Rennae Stubbs (third round)
8. (Belarus) Max Mirnyi / (Russia) Nadia Petrova (third round)
9. (The Bahamas) Mark Knowles / (Germany) Anna-Lena Grönefeld (champions)
10. (Serbia) Nenad Zimonjić / (China) Yan Zi (second round)
11. (Brazil) André Sá / (Japan) Ai Sugiyama (quarterfinals)
12. (Australia) Stephen Huss / (Spain) Virginia Ruano Pascual (semifinals)
13. (India) Mahesh Bhupathi / (India) Sania Mirza (third round)
14. (Brazil) Marcelo Melo / (China) Peng Shuai (second round)
15. (Czech Republic) Lukáš Dlouhý / (Czech Republic) Iveta Benešová (quarterfinals)
16. (Germany) Christopher Kas / (Chinese Taipei) Chuang Chia-jung (third round)

Click on the seed number of a player to go to their draw section.

== Draw ==
=== Key ===
- Q = Qualifier
- WC = Wild card
- LL = Lucky loser
- Alt = Alternate
- ITF = ITF entry
- PR = Protected ranking
- SR = Special ranking
- SE = Special exempt
- JE = Junior exempt
- JR = Junior Accelerator Programme entrant
- CO = College Accelerator Programme entrant
- NG = Next Gen Accelerator Program entrant
- w/o = Walkover
- r = Retired
- d = Defaulted

=== Finals ===
Quarterfinals
1	(India) Leander Paes (Zimbabwe) Cara Black	6	6
11	(Brazil) André Sá (Japan) Ai Sugiyama	3	3
4	(Zimbabwe) Kevin Ullyett (Chinese Taipei) Hsieh Su-wei	3	7	7
12	(Australia) Stephen Huss (Spain) Virginia Ruano Pascual	6	5	9
(United Kingdom) Jamie Murray (United States) Liezel Huber
15	(Czech Republic) Lukáš Dlouhý (Czech Republic) Iveta Benešová	w/o
9	(The Bahamas) Mark Knowles (Germany) Anna-Lena Grönefeld	0	7	6
2	(United States) Bob Bryan (Australia) Samantha Stosur	6	5	3

Semifinals
1	(India) Leander Paes (Zimbabwe) Cara Black	6	6
12	(Australia) Stephen Huss (Spain) Virginia Ruano Pascual	4	4
(United Kingdom) Jamie Murray (United States) Liezel Huber	2	5
9	(The Bahamas) Mark Knowles (Germany) Anna-Lena Grönefeld	6	7

Final
1	(India) Leander Paes (Zimbabwe) Cara Black	5	3
9	(The Bahamas) Mark Knowles (Germany) Anna-Lena Grönefeld	7	6

=== Top half ===
==== Section 1 ====
First round
(South Africa) W Moodie (Czech Republic) V Uhlířová	6	2	9
(Slovakia) M Mertiňák (Italy) M Santangelo	3	6	11
(Serbia) D Vemić (Italy) F Pennetta	5	6	5
WC	(United Kingdom) C Fleming (United Kingdom) S Borwell	7	4	7
(Australia) A Fisher (United States) A Spears	4	4
WC	(United Kingdom) K Skupski (United Kingdom) K O'Brien	6	6
(Romania) A Pavel (Romania) M Niculescu	7	3	6
(Australia) J Kerr (United States) V King	5	6	3

Second round
1	(India) L Paes (Zimbabwe) C Black
(Slovakia) M Mertiňák (Italy) M Santangelo	w/o
WC	(United Kingdom) C Fleming (United Kingdom) S Borwell	6^{4}	4
13	(India) M Bhupathi (India) S Mirza	7^{7}	6
11	(Brazil) A Sá (Japan) A Sugiyama	6	7^{7}
WC	(United Kingdom) K Skupski (United Kingdom) K O'Brien	3	6^{4}
(Romania) A Pavel (Romania) M Niculescu	3	6	6
7	(Sweden) R Lindstedt (Australia) R Stubbs	6	2	8

Third round
1	(India) L Paes (Zimbabwe) C Black	6	6^{2}	6
13	(India) M Bhupathi (India) S Mirza	2	7^{7}	3
11	(Brazil) A Sá (Japan) A Sugiyama	6^{11}	6	6
7	(Sweden) R Lindstedt (Australia) R Stubbs	7^{13}	3	2

Quarterfinals
1	(India) L Paes (Zimbabwe) C Black	6	6
11	(Brazil) A Sá (Japan) A Sugiyama	3	3

==== Section 2 ====
First round
(Netherlands Antilles) J-J Rojer (Kazakhstan) G Voskoboeva	4	6	15
(South Africa) J Coetzee (United States) J Craybas	6	3	13
(Israel) A Ram (Russia) A Chakvetadze	2	6	2
(Russia) I Andreev (Russia) M Kirilenko	6	3	6
(United Kingdom) R Hutchins (United Kingdom) A Keothavong	4	2
(Brazil) B Soares (Russia) A Kleybanova	6	6
WC	(United Kingdom) A Bogdanovic (United Kingdom) M South	5	3
(Netherlands) R Wassen (Thailand) T Tanasugarn	7	6

Second round
4	(Zimbabwe) K Ullyett (Chinese Taipei) S-w Hsieh	6	6
(Netherlands Antilles) J-J Rojer (Kazakhstan) G Voskoboeva	3	4
(Russia) I Andreev (Russia) M Kirilenko	w/o
16	(Germany) C Kas (Chinese Taipei) C-j Chuang
12	(Australia) S Huss (Spain) V Ruano Pascual	7	7^{7}
(Brazil) B Soares (Russia) A Kleybanova	5	6^{5}
(Netherlands) R Wassen (Thailand) T Tanasugarn	w/o
8	(Belarus) M Mirnyi (Russia) N Petrova

Third round
4	(Zimbabwe) K Ullyett (Chinese Taipei) S-w Hsieh	6	6
16	(Germany) C Kas (Chinese Taipei) C-j Chuang	3	2
12	(Australia) S Huss (Spain) V Ruano Pascual	6	7^{11}
8	(Belarus) M Mirnyi (Russia) N Petrova	3	6^{9}

Quarterfinals
4	(Zimbabwe) K Ullyett (Chinese Taipei) S-w Hsieh	3	7	7
12	(Australia) S Huss (Spain) V Ruano Pascual	6	5	9

=== Bottom half ===
==== Section 3 ====
First round
(Germany) P Petzschner (Czech Republic) B Záhlavová-Strýcová	6	6
(United States) S Lipsky (Russia) E Makarova	4	4
(South Africa) R de Voest (United States) R Kops-Jones	6	6^{7}	1
(United Kingdom) J Murray (United States) L Huber	2	7^{9}	6
(United States) E Butorac (Kazakhstan) Y Shvedova	6	6
(Sweden) J Brunström (Russia) V Dushevina	3	4
(Australia) P Hanley (Australia) A Rodionova	6	6
(Slovakia) F Polášek (Czech Republic) A Hlaváčková	3	2

Second round
6	(United States) M Bryan (United States) B Mattek-Sands	6	6
(Germany) P Petzschner (Czech Republic) B Záhlavová-Strýcová	1	1
(United Kingdom) J Murray (United States) L Huber	7^{7}	3	6
10	(Serbia) N Zimonjić (China) Z Yan	6^{3}	6	3
15	(Czech Republic) L Dlouhý (Czech Republic) I Benešová	7	7^{7}
(United States) E Butorac (Kazakhstan) Y Shvedova	5	6^{1}
(Australia) P Hanley (Australia) A Rodionova	1	3
3	(Poland) M Matkowski (United States) L Raymond	6	6

Third round
6	(United States) M Bryan (United States) B Mattek-Sands	6^{7}	6	3
(United Kingdom) J Murray (United States) L Huber	7^{9}	4	6
15	(Czech Republic) L Dlouhý (Czech Republic) I Benešová	4	6	6
3	(Poland) M Matkowski (United States) L Raymond	6	4	2

Quarterfinals
(United Kingdom) J Murray (United States) L Huber
15	(Czech Republic) L Dlouhý (Czech Republic) I Benešová	w/o

==== Section 4 ====
First round
(United States) T Parrott (Ukraine) K Bondarenko	6^{5}	2
WC	(United Kingdom) J Auckland (United Kingdom) E Baltacha	7^{7}	6
(Belgium) D Norman (Latvia) L Dekmeijere	3	4
(United States) J Cerretani (Austria) S Bammer	6	6
(Czech Republic) F Čermák (Czech Republic) L Hradecká	6^{4}	3
(France) F Santoro (Spain) A Medina Garrigues	7^{7}	6
WC	(United Kingdom) J Goodall (United Kingdom) N Cavaday	2	4
(Argentina) L Arnold Ker (Argentina) G Dulko	6	6

Second round
5	(Canada) D Nestor (Russia) E Vesnina	6	6
WC	(United Kingdom) J Auckland (United Kingdom) E Baltacha	1	2
(United States) J Cerretani (Austria) S Bammer	6^{5}	3
9	(The Bahamas) M Knowles (Germany) A-L Grönefeld	7^{7}	6
14	(Brazil) M Melo (China) S Peng	4	3
(France) F Santoro (Spain) A Medina Garrigues	6	6
(Argentina) L Arnold Ker (Argentina) G Dulko	1	4
2	(United States) B Bryan (Australia) S Stosur	6	6

Third round
5	(Canada) D Nestor (Russia) E Vesnina	4	4
9	(The Bahamas) M Knowles (Germany) A-L Grönefeld	6	6
(France) F Santoro (Spain) A Medina Garrigues	w/o
2	(United States) B Bryan (Australia) S Stosur

Quarterfinals
9	(The Bahamas) M Knowles (Germany) A-L Grönefeld	0	7	6
2	(United States) B Bryan (Australia) S Stosur	6	5	3
