= 2009 Wimbledon Championships – Women's doubles =

Women's doubles
- 2009 Wimbledon Championships

Final
- Champions: (United States) Serena Williams (United States) Venus Williams
- Runners-up: (Australia) Samantha Stosur (Australia) Rennae Stubbs
- Score: 7–6^{(7–4)}, 6–4

Details
- Draw: 64 (4 Q / 5 WC )
- Seeds: 16

Events
Singles	men	women		boys	girls
Doubles	men	women	mixed	boys	girls
WC Singles	men	women	quad
WC Doubles	men	women	quad
Legends	men	women	seniors
← 2008 ·	Wimbledon Championships	· 2010 →

Defending champions Serena and Venus Williams defeated Samantha Stosur and Rennae Stubbs in the final, 7–6^{(7–4)}, 6–4 to win the ladies' doubles tennis title at the 2009 Wimbledon Championships. It was their fourth Wimbledon title together and ninth major title together overall. For the second consecutive year, the pair did not lose a set during the tournament. As also in the previous year, the Williams sisters contested the singles final as well, with Serena emerging victorious. It was also the first component in an eventual non-calendar-year Grand Slam for the sisters.

== Seeds ==
1. (Zimbabwe) Cara Black / (United States) Liezel Huber (semifinals)
2. (Spain) Anabel Medina Garrigues / (Spain) Virginia Ruano Pascual (semifinals)
3. (Australia) Samantha Stosur / (Australia) Rennae Stubbs (final)
4. (United States) Serena Williams / (United States) Venus Williams (champions)
5. (Chinese Taipei) Hsieh Su-wei / (China) Peng Shuai (first round)
6. (Slovakia) Daniela Hantuchová / (Japan) Ai Sugiyama (second round)
7. (Belarus) Victoria Azarenka / (Russia) Elena Vesnina (third round, withdrew due to heat illness)
8. (Russia) Maria Kirilenko / (Italy) Flavia Pennetta (first round)
9. (United States) Lisa Raymond / (Russia) Vera Zvonareva (first round)
10. (United States) Bethanie Mattek-Sands / (Russia) Nadia Petrova (third round)
11. (Spain) Nuria Llagostera Vives / (Spain) María José Martínez Sánchez (quarterfinals)
12. (Germany) Anna-Lena Grönefeld / (United States) Vania King (quarterfinals)
13. (China) Yan Zi / (China) Zheng Jie (third round)
14. (France) Nathalie Dechy / (Italy) Mara Santangelo (first round)
15. (Chinese Taipei) Chuang Chia-jung / (India) Sania Mirza (second round)
16. (Russia) Svetlana Kuznetsova / (France) Amélie Mauresmo (third round)

Click on the seed number of a player to go to their draw section.

== Draw ==
=== Key ===
- Q = Qualifier
- WC = Wild card
- LL = Lucky loser
- Alt = Alternate
- ITF = ITF entry
- PR = Protected ranking
- SR = Special ranking
- SE = Special exempt
- JE = Junior exempt
- JR = Junior Accelerator Programme entrant
- CO = College Accelerator Programme entrant
- NG = Next Gen Accelerator Program entrant
- w/o = Walkover
- r = Retired
- d = Defaulted

=== Finals ===
Quarterfinals
1	(Zimbabwe) Cara Black (United States) Liezel Huber	4	6	6
11	(Spain) Nuria Llagostera Vives (Spain) María José Martínez Sánchez	6	3	0
4	(United States) Serena Williams (United States) Venus Williams	6	7
12	(Germany) Anna-Lena Grönefeld (United States) Vania King	2	5
(Germany) Kristina Barrois (Italy) Tathiana Garbin	6	3	4
3	(Australia) Samantha Stosur (Australia) Rennae Stubbs	1	6	6
(Russia) Alisa Kleybanova (Russia) Ekaterina Makarova	4	5
2	(Spain) Anabel Medina Garrigues (Spain) Virginia Ruano Pascual	6	7

Semifinals
1	(Zimbabwe) Cara Black (United States) Liezel Huber	1	2
4	(United States) Serena Williams (United States) Venus Williams	6	6
3	(Australia) Samantha Stosur (Australia) Rennae Stubbs	6^{3}	6	6
2	(Spain) Anabel Medina Garrigues (Spain) Virginia Ruano Pascual	7^{7}	4	2

Final
4	(United States) Serena Williams (United States) Venus Williams	7^{7}	6
3	(Australia) Samantha Stosur (Australia) Rennae Stubbs	6^{4}	4

=== Top half ===
==== Section 1 ====
First round
1	(Zimbabwe) C Black (United States) L Huber	6	6
(United States) R Kops-Jones (United States) A Spears	1	4
Q	(Ukraine) Y Fedak (Bosnia and Herzegovina) M Jugić-Salkić	4	3
(Poland) K Jans (Poland) A Rosolska	6	6
(Czech Republic) I Benešová (Czech Republic) B Záhlavová-Strýcová	6	2	7
(Austria) S Bammer (United States) A Glatch	2	6	5
(Kazakhstan) Y Shvedova (Thailand) T Tanasugarn	6	6
14	(France) N Dechy (Italy) M Santangelo	3	3
11	(Spain) N Llagostera Vives (Spain) MJ Martínez Sánchez	6	6^{8}	6
(Uzbekistan) A Amanmuradova (France) J Coin	2	7^{10}	2
(Russia) A Pavlyuchenkova (Italy) F Schiavone	6	7^{7}
(France) A Cornet (France) P Parmentier	2	6^{4}
(Slovakia) M Rybáriková (Belgium) Y Wickmayer	6	6
(Latvia) L Dekmeijere (Ukraine) V Kutuzova	3	0
WC	(United Kingdom) E Baltacha (United Kingdom) A Elliott	0	4
7	(Belarus) V Azarenka (Russia) E Vesnina	6	6

Second round
1	(Zimbabwe) C Black (United States) L Huber	7	6
(Poland) K Jans (Poland) A Rosolska	5	2
(Czech Republic) I Benešová (Czech Republic) B Záhlavová-Strýcová	2	6	6
(Kazakhstan) Y Shvedova (Thailand) T Tanasugarn	6	4	4
11	(Spain) N Llagostera Vives (Spain) MJ Martínez Sánchez	7	6
(Russia) A Pavlyuchenkova (Italy) F Schiavone	5	3
(Slovakia) M Rybáriková (Belgium) Y Wickmayer	w/o
7	(Belarus) V Azarenka (Russia) E Vesnina

Third round
1	(Zimbabwe) C Black (United States) L Huber	2	6	6
(Czech Republic) I Benešová (Czech Republic) B Záhlavová-Strýcová	6	3	4
11	(Spain) N Llagostera Vives (Spain) MJ Martínez Sánchez
7	(Belarus) V Azarenka (Russia) E Vesnina	w/o

Quarterfinals
1	(Zimbabwe) C Black (United States) L Huber	4	6	6
11	(Spain) N Llagostera Vives (Spain) MJ Martínez Sánchez	6	3	0

==== Section 2 ====
First round
4	(United States) S Williams (United States) V Williams	6	6
(France) V Razzano (France) A Rezaï	3	3
(Germany) S Lisicki (Canada) A Wozniak	6	6
(Estonia) M Ani (Italy) R Vinci	3	3
(Australia) J Groth (Czech Republic) R Voráčová	4	3
(Argentina) G Dulko (Israel) S Pe'er	6	6
(Japan) A Morigami (Japan) A Morita	1	1
13	(China) Z Yan (China) J Zheng	6	6
12	(Germany) A-L Grönefeld (United States) V King	6	6
(Hungary) M Czink (South Africa) N Grandin	4	3
WC	(United Kingdom) J Rae (United Kingdom) M South	6	7^{7}
(Ukraine) A Bondarenko (Ukraine) K Bondarenko	1	6^{4}
(Chinese Taipei) Y-j Chan (Hungary) Á Szávay	5	6	4
(Russia) V Dushevina (Ukraine) T Perebiynis	7	3	6
(Estonia) K Kanepi (Turkey) İ Şenoğlu	6	7^{7}
8	(Russia) M Kirilenko (Italy) F Pennetta	3	6^{4}

Second round
4	(United States) S Williams (United States) V Williams	6	6
(Germany) S Lisicki (Canada) A Wozniak	1	4
(Argentina) G Dulko (Israel) S Pe'er	4	1
13	(China) Z Yan (China) J Zheng	6	6
12	(Germany) A-L Grönefeld (United States) V King	2	6	6
(United Kingdom) J Rae (United Kingdom) M South	6	3	4
(Russia) V Dushevina (Ukraine) T Perebiynis	4	6	2
(Estonia) K Kanepi (Turkey) İ Şenoğlu	6	4	6

Third round
4	(United States) S Williams (United States) V Williams	6	6
13	(China) Z Yan (China) J Zheng	0	0
12	(Germany) A-L Grönefeld (United States) V King	6	6
(Estonia) K Kanepi (Turkey) İ Şenoğlu	3	3

Quarterfinals
4	(United States) S Williams (United States) V Williams	6	7
12	(Germany) A-L Grönefeld (United States) V King	2	5

=== Bottom half ===
==== Section 3 ====
First round
5	(Chinese Taipei) S-w Hsieh (China) S Peng	4	6	2
(Romania) S Cîrstea (Denmark) C Wozniacki	6	2	6
WC	(United Kingdom) N Cavaday (United Kingdom) K O'Brien	4	3
(Ukraine) M Koryttseva (Belarus) T Poutchek	6	6
Q	(Japan) R Fujiwara (Japan) A Nakamura	6	4	7
(Germany) K Barrois (Italy) T Garbin	3	6	9
(Italy) S Errani (Spain) C Suárez Navarro	6
9	(United States) L Raymond (Russia) V Zvonareva	5^{r}
16	(Russia) S Kuznetsova (France) A Mauresmo	6	6
Q	(Germany) T Malek (Germany) A Petkovic	3	4
WC	(United Kingdom) J Curtis (United Kingdom) A Smith	4	6	11
WC	(United Kingdom) L Robson (United Kingdom) G Stoop	6	3	13
(Italy) ME Camerin (Russia) A Chakvetadze	5	7^{7}	6
Q	(Romania) E Gallovits (Hungary) K Marosi	7	6^{4}	4
(United Kingdom) S Borwell (United Kingdom) A Keothavong	2	3
3	(Australia) S Stosur (Australia) R Stubbs	6	6

Second round
(Romania) S Cîrstea (Denmark) C Wozniacki	6	6^{8}	4
(Ukraine) M Koryttseva (Belarus) T Poutchek	4	7^{10}	6
(Germany) K Barrois (Italy) T Garbin	7^{7}	6
(Italy) S Errani (Spain) C Suárez Navarro	6^{5}	1
16	(Russia) S Kuznetsova (France) A Mauresmo	6	6
WC	(United Kingdom) L Robson (United Kingdom) G Stoop	3	4
(Italy) ME Camerin (Russia) A Chakvetadze	3	5
3	(Australia) S Stosur (Australia) R Stubbs	6	7

Third round
(Ukraine) M Koryttseva (Belarus) T Poutchek	3	4
(Germany) K Barrois (Italy) T Garbin	6	6
16	(Russia) S Kuznetsova (France) A Mauresmo	3	2
3	(Australia) S Stosur (Australia) R Stubbs	6	6

Quarterfinals
(Germany) K Barrois (Italy) T Garbin	6	3	4
3	(Australia) S Stosur (Australia) R Stubbs	1	6	6

==== Section 4 ====
First round
6	(Slovakia) D Hantuchová (Japan) A Sugiyama	6	6
(Austria) T Paszek (Ukraine) O Savchuk	0	1
(Russia) A Kleybanova (Russia) E Makarova	6	0
(Slovakia) D Cibulková (Slovakia) J Husárová	0	0^{r}
(Czech Republic) E Hrdinová (Czech Republic) N Vaidišová	5	7^{12}	5
(United States) J Ditty (Belarus) E Dzehalevich	7	6^{10}	7
(Poland) A Radwańska (Poland) U Radwańska	4	6^{5}
10	(United States) B Mattek-Sands (Russia) N Petrova	6	7^{7}
15	(Chinese Taipei) C-j Chuang (India) S Mirza	6	6
(United States) J Craybas (United States) C Gullickson	4	2
(Spain) L Domínguez Lino (Spain) A Parra Santonja	5	6	1
(Russia) A Kudryavtseva (Romania) M Niculescu	7	4	6
(Australia) A Rodionova (Kazakhstan) G Voskoboeva	6	6
(Czech Republic) L Šafářová (Czech Republic) V Uhlířová	1	3
(Czech Republic) A Hlaváčková (Czech Republic) L Hradecká	6^{3}	3
2	(Spain) A Medina Garrigues (Spain) V Ruano Pascual	7^{7}	6

Second round
6	(Slovakia) D Hantuchová (Japan) A Sugiyama	6	6^{5}	2
(Russia) A Kleybanova (Russia) E Makarova	4	7^{7}	6
(United States) J Ditty (Belarus) E Dzehalevich	2	2
10	(United States) B Mattek-Sands (Russia) N Petrova	6	6
15	(Chinese Taipei) C-j Chuang (India) S Mirza	2	3
(Russia) A Kudryavtseva (Romania) M Niculescu	6	6
(Australia) A Rodionova (Kazakhstan) G Voskoboeva	7	2	4
2	(Spain) A Medina Garrigues (Spain) V Ruano Pascual	5	6	6

Third round
(Russia) A Kleybanova (Russia) E Makarova	6	7
10	(United States) B Mattek-Sands (Russia) N Petrova	4	5
(Russia) A Kudryavtseva (Romania) M Niculescu	5	3
2	(Spain) A Medina Garrigues (Spain) V Ruano Pascual	7	6

Quarterfinals
(Russia) A Kleybanova (Russia) E Makarova	4	5
2	(Spain) A Medina Garrigues (Spain) V Ruano Pascual	6	7
