= 2009 Wimbledon Championships – Boys' singles =

Boys' singles
- 2009 Wimbledon Championships

Final
- Champion: (Russia) Andrey Kuznetsov
- Runner-up: (United States) Jordan Cox
- Score: 4—6, 6–2, 6–2

Details
- Draw: 64 (8 Q / 8 WC )
- Seeds: 16

Events
| Singles | men | women | | boys | girls |
| Doubles | men | women | mixed | boys | girls |
| WC Singles | men | women | quad |
| WC Doubles | men | women | quad |
| Legends | men | women | seniors |
| ← 2008 · | Wimbledon Championships | · 2010 → |

Andrey Kuznetsov defeated Jordan Cox in the final, 4—6, 6–2, 6–2 to win the boys' singles tennis title at the 2009 Wimbledon Championships.

Grigor Dimitrov was the defending champion, but received a wildcard into the gentlemen's singles event, where he lost to Igor Kunitsyn in the first round.

== Seeds ==
1. (Sweden) Daniel Berta (third round)
2. (Chinese Taipei) Huang Liang-chi (first round)
3. (Australia) Bernard Tomic (semifinals)
4. (Argentina) Agustín Velotti (quarterfinals)
5. (Argentina) Andrea Collarini (first round)
6. (France) Gianni Mina (second round)
7. (Japan) Shuichi Sekiguchi (first round)
8. (Guatemala) Julen Urigüen (first round)
9. (Germany) Dominik Schulz (quarterfinals)
10. (France) Julien Obry (second round)
11. (Venezuela) David Souto (second round)
12. (United States) Denis Kudla (first round)
13. (Chinese Taipei) Hsieh Cheng-peng (second round)
14. (Argentina) Facundo Argüello (first round)
15. (United States) Tennys Sandgren (second round)
16. (United States) Evan King (first round)

Click on the seed number of a player to go to their draw section.

== Draw ==
=== Key ===
- Q = Qualifier
- WC = Wild card
- LL = Lucky loser
- Alt = Alternate
- ITF = ITF entry
- PR = Protected ranking
- SR = Special ranking
- SE = Special exempt
- JE = Junior exempt
- JR = Junior Accelerator Programme entrant
- CO = College Accelerator Programme entrant
- NG = Next Gen Accelerator Program entrant
- w/o = Walkover
- r = Retired
- d = Defaulted

=== Finals ===
Quarterfinals
(United States) Alexander Domijan | 7^{7} | 3 | 4
(United States) Devin Britton | 6^{2} | 6 | 6
4 | (Argentina) Agustín Velotti | 5 | 6 | 3
Q | (United States) Jordan Cox | 7 | 3 | 6
9 | (Germany) Dominik Schulz | 2 | 7 | 1
3 | (Australia) Bernard Tomic | 6 | 5 | 6
(Russia) Andrey Kuznetsov | 6 | 6
(Croatia) Dino Marcan | 4 | 3

Semifinals
(United States) Devin Britton | 3 | 7^{7} | 14
Q | (United States) Jordan Cox | 6 | 6^{5} | 16
3 | (Australia) Bernard Tomic | 3 | 6^{6}
(Russia) Andrey Kuznetsov | 6 | 7^{8}

Final
Q | (United States) Jordan Cox | 6 | 2 | 2
(Russia) Andrey Kuznetsov | 4 | 6 | 6

=== Top half ===
==== Section 1 ====
First round
1 | (Sweden) Daniel Berta | 6 | 6
(Belgium) Yannik Reuter | 4 | 0
(Austria) Dominik Wirlend | 6 | 2 | 4
Q | (United Kingdom) David Thomson | 4 | 6 | 6
(United States) Alexander Domijan | 4 | 6 | 6
Q | (United Kingdom) Liam Broady | 6 | 4 | 3
Q | (United States) Johannes Robert Van Overbeek | 6 | 6^{3} | 11
13 | (Chinese Taipei) Hsieh Cheng-peng | 4 | 7^{7} | 13
10 | (France) Julien Obry | 6 | 6
LL | (Czech Republic) Robert Rumler | 1 | 2
(Brazil) Tiago Fernandes | 6 | 6
(Switzerland) Sandro Ehrat | 4 | 4
(New Zealand) Sebastian Lavie | 6 | 7
WC | (United Kingdom) Jack Carpenter | 4 | 5
(United States) Devin Britton | 6 | 6
7 | (Japan) Shuichi Sekiguchi | 4 | 0

Second round
1 | (Sweden) D Berta | 6 | 6
Q | (United Kingdom) D Thomson | 3 | 1
(United States) A Domijan | 6 | 6
13 | (Chinese Taipei) C-p Hsieh | 2 | 3
10 | (France) J Obry | 6^{4} | 7^{7} | 4
(Brazil) T Fernandes | 7^{7} | 6^{3} | 6
(New Zealand) S Lavie | 4 | 5
(United States) D Britton | 6 | 7

Third round
1 | (Sweden) D Berta | 3 | 3
(United States) A Domijan | 6 | 6
(Brazil) T Fernandes | 5 | 3
(United States) D Britton | 7 | 6

Quarterfinals
(United States) A Domijan | 7^{7} | 3 | 4
(United States) D Britton | 6^{2} | 6 | 6

==== Section 2 ====
First round
4 | (Argentina) Agustín Velotti | 6^{5} | 6 | 7
(South Africa) Nicolaas Scholtz | 7^{7} | 4 | 5
(Philippines) Francis Alcantara | 2 | 6 | 3
(Austria) Maximilian Neuchrist | 6 | 4 | 6
(Slovakia) Filip Horanský | 7^{7} | 7
WC | (United Kingdom) James Marsalek | 6^{5} | 5
(France) Adrien Puget | 3 | 2
15 | (United States) Tennys Sandgren | 6 | 6
11 | (Venezuela) David Souto | 6 | 5 | 6
WC | (United Kingdom) Lewis Burton | 4 | 7 | 4
(Greece) Alexandros Georgoudas | 4 | 5
Q | (United States) Jordan Cox | 6 | 7
Q | (Belarus) Andrei Vasilevski | 6 | 6
(Croatia) Marin Draganja | 4 | 4
(Italy) Federico Gaio | 7^{8} | 6
8 | (Guatemala) Julen Urigüen | 6^{6} | 4

Second round
4 | (Argentina) A Velotti | 7^{7} | 6
(Austria) M Neuchrist | 6^{3} | 4
(Slovakia) F Horanský | 3 | 7^{12} | 6
15 | (United States) T Sandgren | 6 | 6^{10} | 4
11 | (Venezuela) D Souto | 6^{5} | 6 | 3
Q | (United States) J Cox | 7^{7} | 3 | 6
Q | (Belarus) A Vasilevski | 6 | 3 | 7
(Italy) F Gaio | 3 | 6 | 5

Third round
4 | (Argentina) A Velotti | 7^{7} | 6
(Slovakia) F Horanský | 6^{3} | 1
Q | (United States) J Cox | 7^{7} | 6
Q | (Belarus) A Vasilevski | 6^{3} | 3

Quarterfinals
4 | (Argentina) A Velotti | 5 | 6 | 3
Q | (United States) J Cox | 7 | 3 | 6

=== Bottom half ===
==== Section 3 ====
First round
5 | (Argentina) Andrea Collarini | 2 | 5
(Spain) Carlos Boluda-Purkiss | 6 | 7
(Slovakia) Jozef Kovalík | 6 | 2 | 6
(United States) Mitchell Frank | 4 | 6 | 4
(France) Pierre-Hugues Herbert | 7^{7} | 3 | 4
WC | (United Kingdom) Richard Gabb | 6^{5} | 6 | 6
(Czech Republic) Radim Urbanek | 4 | 2
9 | (Germany) Dominik Schulz | 6 | 6
16 | (United States) Evan King | 3 | 2
(Belgium) Arthur De Greef | 6 | 6
Q | (Italy) Alessandro Bega | 6 | 4 | 2
WC | (United Kingdom) Tom Farquharson | 3 | 6 | 6
(Egypt) Karim-Mohamed Maamoun | 3 | 6 | 2
(India) Sudarwa Sitaram | 6 | 4 | 6
WC | (United Kingdom) George Morgan | 6^{1} | 2
3 | (Australia) Bernard Tomic | 7^{7} | 6

Second round
(Spain) C Boluda-Purkiss | 7 | 7
(Slovakia) J Kovalík | 5 | 5
WC | (United Kingdom) R Gabb | 6^{5} | 4
9 | (Germany) D Schulz | 7^{7} | 6
(Belgium) A De Greef | 0 | 0^{r}
WC | (United Kingdom) T Farquharson | 6 | 1
(India) S Sitaram | 2 | 2
3 | (Australia) B Tomic | 6 | 6

Third round
(Spain) C Boluda-Purkiss | 6^{4} | 6^{5}
9 | (Germany) D Schulz | 7^{7} | 7^{7}
WC | (United Kingdom) T Farquharson | 3 | 4
3 | (Australia) B Tomic | 6 | 6

Quarterfinals
9 | (Germany) D Schulz | 2 | 7 | 1
3 | (Australia) B Tomic | 6 | 5 | 6

==== Section 4 ====
First round
6 | (France) Gianni Mina | 6 | 7^{7}
WC | (United Kingdom) Oliver Golding | 4 | 6^{5}
(Russia) Andrey Kuznetsov | 6^{0} | 6 | 6
(Austria) Tristan-Samuel Weissborn | 7^{7} | 2 | 0
Q | (Germany) Kevin Krawietz | 7^{7} | 7^{7}
(Brazil) Guilherme Clezar | 6^{5} | 6^{5}
(Japan) Hiroyasu Ehara | 3 | 7 | 8
12 | (United States) Denis Kudla | 6 | 5 | 6
14 | (Argentina) Facundo Argüello | 6 | 1 | 3
(Croatia) Dino Marcan | 3 | 6 | 6
(New Zealand) Riki McLachlan | 4 | 2
(Ukraine) Stanislav Poplavskyy | 6 | 6
(United States) Harry Fowler | 7^{7} | 5 | 9
Q | (Italy) Emanuele Molina | 6^{2} | 7 | 7
WC | (United Kingdom) Ashley Hewitt | 6 | 7
2 | (Chinese Taipei) Huang Liang-chi | 4 | 5

Second round
6 | (France) G Mina | 5 | 1
(Russia) A Kuznetsov | 7 | 6
Q | (Germany) K Krawietz | 6 | 2 | 3
(Japan) H Ehara | 2 | 6 | 6
(Croatia) D Marcan | 2 | 6 | 7
(Ukraine) S Poplavskyy | 6 | 3 | 5
(United States) H Fowler | 3 | 6 | 6
WC | (United Kingdom) A Hewitt | 6 | 3 | 4

Third round
(Russia) A Kuznetsov | 6 | 6
(Japan) H Ehara | 2 | 3
(Croatia) D Marcan | 6 | 6
(United States) H Fowler | 0 | 4

Quarterfinals
(Russia) A Kuznetsov | 6 | 6
(Croatia) D Marcan | 4 | 3
