= 2009 Wimbledon Championships – Men's singles =

Men's singles
- 2009 Wimbledon Championships

Final
- Champion: (Switzerland) Roger Federer
- Runner-up: (United States) Andy Roddick
- Score: 5–7, 7–6^{(8–6)}, 7–6^{(7–5)}, 3–6, 16–14

Details
- Draw: 128 (16Q / 7WC)
- Seeds: 32

Events
Singles	men	women		boys	girls
Doubles	men	women	mixed	boys	girls
WC Singles	men	women	quad
WC Doubles	men	women	quad
Legends	men	women	seniors
← 2008 ·	Wimbledon Championships	· 2010 →

Roger Federer defeated Andy Roddick in the final, 5–7, 7–6^{(8–6)}, 7–6^{(7–5)}, 3–6, 16–14 to win the gentlemen's singles tennis title at the 2009 Wimbledon Championships. It was his sixth Wimbledon title and record 15th major men's singles title overall, breaking Pete Sampras' all-time record. It was the longest men's singles major final (in terms of games played) in history with 77 games, breaking the record of 71 games from the 1927 Australian Championships. The match also had the longest fifth set (16–14) in a major men's singles final, surpassing the 11–9 fifth set in the 1927 French Championships final. The match lasted 4 hours and 17 minutes, and the fifth set alone lasted 95 minutes. It was a rematch of the 2004 and 2005 finals, where Federer also beat Roddick to win the title. This was Federer's eleventh grass court men's singles title, surpassing Sampras' Open Era record. Notably, Roddick lost despite having his serve broken only once, in the last game of the match. By winning the title, Federer regained the world No. 1 singles ranking, and completed the Channel Slam.

Rafael Nadal was the reigning champion, but withdrew from the tournament due to knee tendinitis. This would be the only edition of the tournament between 2006 and 2011 not to feature Nadal in the final.

Roddick's appearance in the final would be the last time an American man reached a major singles final until the 2024 US Open, 15 years later. This was the first major appearance of future ATP Finals champion Grigor Dimitrov, who retired in the first round against Igor Kunitsyn.

== Seeds ==
1. (Spain) Rafael Nadal (withdrew)
2. (Switzerland) Roger Federer (champion)
3. (United Kingdom) Andy Murray (semifinals)
4. (Serbia) Novak Djokovic (quarterfinals)
5. (Argentina) Juan Martín del Potro (second round)
6. (United States) Andy Roddick (final)
7. (Spain) Fernando Verdasco (fourth round)
8. (France) Gilles Simon (fourth round)
9. (France) Jo-Wilfried Tsonga (third round)
10. (Chile) Fernando González (third round)
11. (Croatia) Marin Čilić (third round)
12. (Russia) Nikolay Davydenko (third round)
13. (Sweden) Robin Söderling (fourth round)
14. (Russia) Marat Safin (first round)
15. (Spain) Tommy Robredo (third round)
16. (Spain) David Ferrer (third round)
17. (United States) James Blake (first round)
18. (Germany) Rainer Schüttler (second round)
19. (Switzerland) Stan Wawrinka (fourth round)
20. (Czech Republic) Tomáš Berdych (fourth round)
21. (Spain) Feliciano López (first round)
22. (Croatia) Ivo Karlović (quarterfinals)
23. (Czech Republic) Radek Štěpánek (fourth round)
24. (Germany) Tommy Haas (semifinals)
25. (Russia) Dmitry Tursunov (first round)
26. (Austria) Jürgen Melzer (third round)
27. (Germany) Philipp Kohlschreiber (third round)
28. (United States) Mardy Fish (third round)
29. (Russia) Igor Andreev (fourth round)
30. (Serbia) Viktor Troicki (third round)
31. (Romania) Victor Hănescu (third round)
32. (Spain) Albert Montañés (third round)
33. (Germany) Nicolas Kiefer (first round)

Click on the seed number of a player to go to their draw section.

== Draw ==
Key

- Q = Qualifier
- WC = Wild card
- LL = Lucky loser
- Alt = Alternate
- ITF = ITF entry
- PR = Protected ranking
- SR = Special ranking
- SE = Special exempt
- JE = Junior exempt
- JR = Junior Accelerator Programme entrant
- CO = College Accelerator Programme entrant
- NG = Next Gen Accelerator Program entrant
- w/o = Walkover
- r = Retired
- d = Defaulted

=== Finals ===
Quarterfinals
(Australia) Lleyton Hewitt	3	7^{12}	6^{1}	6	4
6	(United States) Andy Roddick	6	6^{10}	7^{7}	4	6
3	(United Kingdom) Andy Murray	7	6	6
WC	(Spain) Juan Carlos Ferrero	5	3	2
24	(Germany) Tommy Haas	7	7^{8}	4	6
4	(Serbia) Novak Djokovic	5	6^{6}	6	3
22	(Croatia) Ivo Karlović	3	5	6^{3}
2	(Switzerland) Roger Federer	6	7	7^{7}

Semifinals
6	(United States) Andy Roddick	6	4	7^{9}	7^{7}
3	(United Kingdom) Andy Murray	4	6	6^{7}	6^{5}
24	(Germany) Tommy Haas	6^{3}	5	3
2	(Switzerland) Roger Federer	7^{7}	7	6

Final
6	(United States) Andy Roddick	7	6^{6}	6^{5}	6	14
2	(Switzerland) Roger Federer	5	7^{8}	7^{7}	3	16

=== Top half ===
==== Section 1 ====
First round
5	(Argentina) JM del Potro	6	6	6
(France) A Clément	3	1	2
(Australia) L Hewitt	6	6	6
(United States) R Ginepri	4	1	1
Q	(United States) R Ram	6	1	6^{3}	1
(Germany) P Petzschner	2	6	7^{7}	6
(Germany) M Zverev	6	6	3
25	(Russia) D Tursunov	4	2	0^{r}
23	(Czech Republic) R Štěpánek	6	6	6
Q	(Colombia) A Falla	4	4	1
(Italy) P Starace	7^{7}	6	0
(Argentina) J Acasuso	6^{0}	3	0^{r}
(Italy) F Fognini	1	6^{3}	6	3
(Uzbekistan) D Istomin	6	7^{7}	4	1^{r}
(United States) K Kim	5	3	6	2
16	(Spain) D Ferrer	7	6	4	6

Second round
5	(Argentina) JM del Potro	3	5	5
(Australia) L Hewitt	6	7	7
(Germany) P Petzschner	4	7^{15}	3	7^{7}	6
(Germany) M Zverev	6	6^{13}	6	6^{5}	0
23	(Czech Republic) R Štěpánek	6	4	6	4	6
(Italy) P Starace	4	6	2	6	3
(Italy) F Fognini	2	2	3
16	(Spain) D Ferrer	6	6	6

Third round
(Australia) L Hewitt	7	7^{7}	6
(Germany) P Petzschner	5	6^{3}	3
23	(Czech Republic) R Štěpánek	7	7	3	4	6
16	(Spain) D Ferrer	5	5	6	6	4

Fourth round
(Australia) L Hewitt	4	2	6	6	6
23	(Czech Republic) R Štěpánek	6	6	1	2	2

==== Section 2 ====
First round
12	(Russia) N Davydenko	6	6	6
WC	(United Kingdom) D Evans	2	3	3
(Romania) V Crivoi	4	6	7^{7}	2	6
(Germany) B Phau	6	1	6^{3}	6	3
(Portugal) F Gil	1	6	4	2
(France) P-H Mathieu	6	2	6	6
WC	(United Kingdom) A Bogdanovic	3	4	4
20	(Czech Republic) T Berdych	6	6	6
26	(Austria) J Melzer	6	6	6
(United States) W Odesnik	1	4	2
(Germany) B Becker	6	6	6
Q	(Croatia) R Karanušić	4	4	1
WC	(Bulgaria) G Dimitrov	6	0	0^{r}
(Russia) I Kunitsyn	3	6	3
(France) J Chardy	3	6^{3}	6	3
6	(United States) A Roddick	6	7^{7}	4	6

Second round
12	(Russia) N Davydenko	6	6	6
(Romania) V Crivoi	4	4	2
(France) P-H Mathieu	2	4	4
20	(Czech Republic) T Berdych	6	6	6
26	(Austria) J Melzer	7^{8}	6	7^{7}
(Germany) B Becker	6^{6}	3	6^{1}
(Russia) I Kunitsyn	4	2	6	2
6	(United States) A Roddick	6	6	3	6

Third round
12	(Russia) N Davydenko	2	3	2
20	(Czech Republic) T Berdych	6	6	6
26	(Austria) J Melzer	6^{2}	6^{2}	6	3
6	(United States) A Roddick	7^{7}	7^{7}	4	6

Fourth round
20	(Czech Republic) T Berdych	6^{4}	4	3
6	(United States) A Roddick	7^{7}	6	6

==== Section 3 ====
First round
3	(United Kingdom) A Murray	7	6^{3}	6	6
(United States) R Kendrick	5	7^{7}	3	4
Q	(Italy) R Ghedin	2	4	4
(Latvia) E Gulbis	6	6	6
Q	(United States) T Dent	5	6^{6}	6	7^{7}	4
(Spain) D Gimeno Traver	7	7^{8}	4	6^{3}	6
(Argentina) B Dabul	4	4	3
30	(Serbia) V Troicki	6	6	6
19	(Switzerland) S Wawrinka	7	6	6
(Argentina) E Schwank	5	4	1
(Spain) P Andújar	6	3	2	2
(Argentina) M Vassallo Argüello	4	6	6	6
(Belgium) C Rochus	6	6	4	1	9
LL	(Uruguay) P Cuevas	3	4	6	6	11
Q	(United States) J Levine	6	3	7^{7}	6
14	(Russia) M Safin	2	6	6^{4}	4

Second round
3	(United Kingdom) A Murray	6	7	6
(Latvia) E Gulbis	2	5	3
(Spain) D Gimeno Traver	7^{7}	0	6	3	5
30	(Serbia) V Troicki	6^{5}	6	1	6	7
19	(Switzerland) S Wawrinka	6	6	6
(Argentina) M Vassallo Argüello	3	2	2
LL	(Uruguay) P Cuevas	2	1	6	6	3
Q	(United States) J Levine	6	6	4	4	6

Third round
3	(United Kingdom) A Murray	6	6	6
30	(Serbia) V Troicki	2	3	4
19	(Switzerland) S Wawrinka	5	7	6	6
Q	(United States) J Levine	7	5	3	3

Fourth round
3	(United Kingdom) A Murray	2	6	6	5	6
19	(Switzerland) S Wawrinka	6	3	3	7	3

==== Section 4 ====
First round
10	(Chile) F González	7	7	6
(Russia) T Gabashvili	5	5	3
(Spain) Ó Hernández	0	0	3
(Argentina) L Mayer	6	6	6
WC	(Spain) JC Ferrero	6	7^{7}	6
(Russia) M Youzhny	3	6^{3}	3
(France) F Santoro	6	6	6
33	(Germany) N Kiefer	4	2	2
31	(Romania) V Hănescu	6	6^{5}	6	6^{5}	12
(Spain) I Navarro	3	7^{7}	4	7^{7}	10
(France) N Devilder	3	6	6	4	7
(Ecuador) N Lapentti	6	4	3	6	5
LL	(Brazil) T Alves	6	2	6	2	6
PR	(Romania) A Pavel	3	6	1	6	1
(United States) B Reynolds	4	3	3
8	(France) G Simon	6	6	6

Second round
10	(Chile) F González	6^{4}	6	6	6
(Argentina) L Mayer	7^{7}	4	4	4
WC	(Spain) JC Ferrero	6^{1}	6	6	6
(France) F Santoro	7^{7}	3	4	3
31	(Romania) V Hănescu	6	6	6
(France) N Devilder	2	3	1
LL	(Brazil) T Alves	7	3	4	4
8	(France) G Simon	5	6	6	6

Third round
10	(Chile) F González	6	5	4	6	4
WC	(Spain) JC Ferrero	4	7	6	4	6
31	(Romania) V Hănescu	2	5	2
8	(France) G Simon	6	7	6

Fourth round
WC	(Spain) JC Ferrero	7^{7}	6	6
8	(France) G Simon	6^{4}	3	2

=== Bottom half ===
==== Section 5 ====
First round
17	(United States) J Blake	5	4	6^{5}
(Italy) A Seppi	7	6	7^{7}
Q	(France) A Mannarino	2	2	4
(France) M Gicquel	6	6	6
(Chile) P Capdeville	0	4	5
(United States) V Spadea	6	6	7
(Russia) E Korolev	6	6^{2}	4	6^{4}
29	(Russia) I Andreev	4	7^{7}	6	7^{7}
24	(Germany) T Haas	6^{5}	7^{7}	6	6
Q	(Austria) A Peya	7^{7}	6^{0}	3	4
(France) M Llodra	4	7^{7}	6	3	6
WC	(United Kingdom) J Goodall	6	6^{5}	4	6	4
(United States) S Querrey	6	6	6
LL	(Thailand) D Udomchoke	3	4	4
(Spain) A Martín	3	4	4
11	(Croatia) M Čilić	6	6	6

Second round
(Italy) A Seppi	7	6	6^{3}	5	6
(France) M Gicquel	5	4	7^{7}	7	4
(United States) V Spadea	3	5	2
29	(Russia) I Andreev	6	7	6
24	(Germany) T Haas	4
(France) M Llodra	3^{r}
(United States) S Querrey	6	6^{3}	3	7^{7}	4
11	(Croatia) M Čilić	4	7^{7}	6	6^{4}	6

Third round
(Italy) A Seppi	1	6^{5}	6	6^{5}
29	(Russia) I Andreev	6	7^{7}	4	7^{7}
24	(Germany) T Haas	7	7	1	6^{3}	10
11	(Croatia) M Čilić	5	5	6	7^{7}	8

Fourth round
29	(Russia) I Andreev	6^{8}	4	4
24	(Germany) T Haas	7^{10}	6	6

==== Section 6 ====
First round
15	(Spain) T Robredo	7^{7}	6	5	7^{7}
Q	(Slovenia) L Gregorc	6^{4}	4	7	6^{3}
Q	(France) É Roger-Vasselin	5	3	6	6	3
PR	(Austria) S Koubek	7	6	4	3	6
(Israel) D Sela	6	4	7^{7}	6
Q	(Mexico) S González	4	6	6^{2}	3
Q	(Belgium) X Malisse	7^{11}	4	6^{3}	1
18	(Germany) R Schüttler	6^{9}	6	7^{7}	6
28	(United States) M Fish	6	6	4
(Argentina) S Roitman	3	2	1^{r}
(Czech Republic) J Hernych	4	4	6^{4}
(Serbia) J Tipsarević	6	6	7^{7}
Q	(Germany) S Greul	6	6	7
Q	(United States) M Yani	4	2	5
(France) J Benneteau	7^{10}	6^{1}	2	4
4	(Serbia) N Djokovic	6^{8}	7^{7}	6	6

Second round
15	(Spain) T Robredo	3	4	6	7^{7}	6
PR	(Austria) S Koubek	6	6	4	6^{5}	1
(Israel) D Sela	7^{7}	6	6
18	(Germany) R Schüttler	6^{3}	3	2
28	(United States) M Fish	6	3	6	6
(Serbia) J Tipsarević	4	6	1	4
Q	(Germany) S Greul	5	1	4
4	(Serbia) N Djokovic	7	6	6

Third round
15	(Spain) T Robredo	6^{8}	5	6	5
(Israel) D Sela	7^{10}	7	2	7
28	(United States) M Fish	4	4	4
4	(Serbia) N Djokovic	6	6	6

Fourth round
(Israel) D Sela	2	4	1
4	(Serbia) N Djokovic	6	6	6

==== Section 7 ====
First round
7	(Spain) F Verdasco	6	6	6
WC	(United Kingdom) J Ward	1	3	4
WC	(France) N Mahut	3	6^{6}	7	7	4
(Belgium) K Vliegen	6	7^{8}	5	5	6
(Argentina) D Junqueira	1	2	2
(Argentina) G Cañas	6	6	6
Q	(Slovenia) G Žemlja	4	4	4
32	(Spain) A Montañés	6	6	6
22	(Croatia) I Karlović	6	7^{7}	6
Q	(Slovakia) L Lacko	3	6^{4}	3
(Belgium) S Darcis	6	7^{7}	6
(Canada) F Dancevic	4	6^{4}	3
(Italy) S Bolelli	6^{3}	2	7	6	6
(Austria) D Köllerer	7^{7}	6	5	4	4
(Kazakhstan) A Golubev	3	7	6^{4}	6^{5}
9	(France) J-W Tsonga	6	5	7^{7}	7^{7}

Second round
7	(Spain) F Verdasco	7^{7}	6^{3}	7^{7}	6
(Belgium) K Vliegen	6^{3}	7^{7}	6^{4}	4
(Argentina) G Cañas	4	3	6	3
32	(Spain) A Montañés	6	6	4	6
22	(Croatia) I Karlović	7	6	6
(Belgium) S Darcis	5	3	4
(Italy) S Bolelli	w/o
9	(France) J-W Tsonga

Third round
7	(Spain) F Verdasco	4	6	6	7^{7}
32	(Spain) A Montañés	6	1	4	6^{2}
22	(Croatia) I Karlović	7^{7}	6^{5}	7	7^{7}
9	(France) J-W Tsonga	6^{5}	7^{7}	5	6^{5}

Fourth round
7	(Spain) F Verdasco	6^{5}	7^{7}	3	6^{9}
22	(Croatia) I Karlović	7^{7}	6^{4}	6	7^{11}

==== Section 8 ====
First round
13	(Sweden) R Söderling	6^{4}	7	6	6
(Luxembourg) G Müller	7^{7}	5	1	2
(Spain) M Granollers	6	6	6^{4}	6
(Germany) A Beck	2	4	7^{7}	2
(Spain) N Almagro	6^{3}	6^{7}	7^{7}	6	8
(Argentina) J Mónaco	7^{7}	7^{9}	6^{5}	4	6
LL	(Slovakia) K Beck	1	7	6	4	10
21	(Spain) F López	6	5	3	6	8
27	(Germany) P Kohlschreiber	7^{7}	6	6
(France) F Serra	6^{3}	1	4
(Czech Republic) I Minář	6	3	7	6
(Argentina) M González	4	6	5	0
(Spain) G García López	6	6	6
(Argentina) A Calleri	2	3	2
(Chinese Taipei) Y-h Lu	5	3	2
2	(Switzerland) R Federer	7	6	6

Second round
13	(Sweden) R Söderling	4	7^{9}	6	7
(Spain) M Granollers	6	6^{7}	4	5
(Spain) N Almagro	6	7^{7}	3	3	7
LL	(Slovakia) K Beck	4	6^{2}	6	6	5
27	(Germany) P Kohlschreiber	6	3	4	6	8
(Czech Republic) I Minář	4	6	6	2	6
(Spain) G García López	2	2	4
2	(Switzerland) R Federer	6	6	6

Third round
13	(Sweden) R Söderling	7^{9}	6	6
(Spain) N Almagro	6^{7}	4	4
27	(Germany) P Kohlschreiber	3	2	7^{7}	1
2	(Switzerland) R Federer	6	6	6^{5}	6

Fourth round
13	(Sweden) R Söderling	4	6^{5}	6^{5}
2	(Switzerland) R Federer	6	7^{7}	7^{7}

Preceded by 2009 French Open – Men's singles	Grand Slam men's singles	Succeeded by 2009 US Open – Men's singles
