= 2009 Wimbledon Championships – Men's doubles =

Men's doubles
- 2009 Wimbledon Championships

Final
- Champions: (Canada) Daniel Nestor (Serbia) Nenad Zimonjić
- Runners-up: (United States) Bob Bryan (United States) Mike Bryan
- Score: 7–6^{(9–7)}, 6–7^{(3–7)}, 7–6^{(7–3)}, 6–3

Details
- Draw: 64 (4 Q / 4 WC )
- Seeds: 16

Events
| Singles | men | women | | boys | girls |
| Doubles | men | women | mixed | boys | girls |
| WC Singles | men | women | quad |
| WC Doubles | men | women | quad |
| Legends | men | women | seniors |
| ← 2008 · | Wimbledon Championships | · 2010 → |

Daniel Nestor and Nenad Zimonjić successfully defended their title, defeating Bob and Mike Bryan in the final, 7–6^{(9–7)}, 6–7^{(3–7)}, 7–6^{(7–3)}, 6–3, to win the gentlemen's doubles title at the 2009 Wimbledon Championships.

== Seeds ==
1. (United States) Bob Bryan / (United States) Mike Bryan (final)
2. (Canada) Daniel Nestor / (Serbia) Nenad Zimonjić (champions)
3. (Czech Republic) Lukáš Dlouhý / (India) Leander Paes (first round)
4. (India) Mahesh Bhupathi / (The Bahamas) Mark Knowles (quarterfinals)
5. (Brazil) Bruno Soares / (Zimbabwe) Kevin Ullyett (quarterfinals)
6. (Poland) Mariusz Fyrstenberg / (Poland) Marcin Matkowski (first round)
7. (Belarus) Max Mirnyi / (Israel) Andy Ram (third round)
8. (Poland) Łukasz Kubot / (Austria) Oliver Marach (quarterfinals)
9. (South Africa) Wesley Moodie / (Belgium) Dick Norman (semifinals)
10. (United States) Travis Parrott / (Slovakia) Filip Polášek (second round)
11. (Brazil) Marcelo Melo / (Brazil) André Sá (second round)
12. (South Africa) Jeff Coetzee / (Australia) Jordan Kerr (second round)
13. (Czech Republic) František Čermák / (Slovakia) Michal Mertiňák (second round)
14. (South Africa) Rik de Voest / (Australia) Ashley Fisher (first round)
15. (Czech Republic) Martin Damm / (Sweden) Robert Lindstedt (third round)
16. (Australia) Stephen Huss / (United Kingdom) Ross Hutchins (first round)

Click on the seed number of a player to go to their draw section.

== Draw ==
=== Key ===
- Q = Qualifier
- WC = Wild card
- LL = Lucky loser
- Alt = Alternate
- ITF = ITF entry
- PR = Protected ranking
- SR = Special ranking
- SE = Special exempt
- JE = Junior exempt
- JR = Junior Accelerator Programme entrant
- CO = College Accelerator Programme entrant
- NG = Next Gen Accelerator Program entrant
- w/o = Walkover
- r = Retired
- d = Defaulted

=== Finals ===
Quarterfinals
1 | (United States) Bob Bryan (United States) Mike Bryan | 6 | 6 | 6
5 | (Brazil) Bruno Soares (Zimbabwe) Kevin Ullyett | 2 | 1 | 4
4 | (India) Mahesh Bhupathi (The Bahamas) Mark Knowles | 6^{9} | 6 | 6^{7} | 7 | 4
9 | (South Africa) Wesley Moodie (Belgium) Dick Norman | 7^{11} | 4 | 7^{9} | 5 | 6
(Sweden) Simon Aspelin (Australia) Paul Hanley | 6^{5} | 4 | 6^{5}
(United States) James Blake (United States) Mardy Fish | 7^{7} | 6 | 7^{7}
8 | (Poland) Łukasz Kubot (Austria) Oliver Marach | 2 | 3 | 4
2 | (Canada) Daniel Nestor (Serbia) Nenad Zimonjić | 6 | 6 | 6

Semifinals
1 | (United States) Bob Bryan (United States) Mike Bryan | 7^{7} | 7^{7} | 6
9 | (South Africa) Wesley Moodie (Belgium) Dick Norman | 6^{4} | 6^{3} | 4
(United States) James Blake (United States) Mardy Fish | 7 | 6 | 2 | 6^{3} | 8
2 | (Canada) Daniel Nestor (Serbia) Nenad Zimonjić | 5 | 3 | 6 | 7^{7} | 10

Final
1 | (United States) Bob Bryan (United States) Mike Bryan | 6^{7} | 7^{7} | 6^{3} | 3
2 | (Canada) Daniel Nestor (Serbia) Nenad Zimonjić | 7^{9} | 6^{3} | 7^{7} | 6

=== Top half ===
==== Section 1 ====
First round
1 | (United States) B Bryan (United States) M Bryan | 6 | 6 | 6
(Serbia) D Vemić (Germany) M Zverev | 3 | 4 | 3
WC | (United Kingdom) C Fleming (United Kingdom) K Skupski | 7^{7} | 7^{7} | 6^{5} | 4 | 4
(Sweden) J Brunström (Netherlands Antilles) J-J Rojer | 6^{4} | 6^{5} | 7^{7} | 6 | 6
(Spain) M Granollers (Spain) S Ventura Bertomeu | 3 | 4 | 2
Q | (United Kingdom) C Eaton (United Kingdom) A Slabinsky | 6 | 6 | 6
(Czech Republic) L Friedl (Czech Republic) D Škoch | 6 | 7^{7} | 6
14 | (South Africa) R de Voest (Australia) A Fisher | 4 | 6^{4} | 3
12 | (South Africa) J Coetzee (Australia) J Kerr | 6 | 6 | 7
(Spain) D Ferrer (Spain) M López | 1 | 2 | 5
(Netherlands) R Wassen (Slovakia) I Zelenay | 6 | 4 | 2
(Argentina) M González (Argentina) J Mónaco | 1 | 6 | 1^{r}
WC | (United Kingdom) A Bogdanovic (United Kingdom) J Ward | 6 | 6 | 6
LL | (United States) D Martin (Switzerland) J-C Scherrer | 4 | 4 | 4
(Switzerland) Y Allegro (France) F Santoro | 7^{7} | 2 | 4 | 1
5 | (Brazil) B Soares (Zimbabwe) K Ullyett | 6^{4} | 6 | 6 | 6

Second round
1 | (United States) B Bryan (United States) M Bryan | 6 | 6 | 6
(Sweden) J Brunström (Netherlands Antilles) J-J Rojer | 0 | 2 | 4
Q | (United Kingdom) C Eaton (United Kingdom) A Slabinsky | 4 | 3 | 6^{0}
(Czech Republic) L Friedl (Czech Republic) D Škoch | 6 | 6 | 7^{7}
12 | (South Africa) J Coetzee (Australia) J Kerr | 6 | 3 | 4 | 6 | 7
(Netherlands) R Wassen (Slovakia) I Zelenay | 3 | 6 | 6 | 3 | 9
WC | (United Kingdom) A Bogdanovic (United Kingdom) J Ward | 2 | 4 | 7 | 3
5 | (Brazil) B Soares (Zimbabwe) K Ullyett | 6 | 6 | 5 | 6

Third round
1 | (United States) B Bryan (United States) M Bryan | 7 | 6 | 6
(Czech Republic) L Friedl (Czech Republic) D Škoch | 5 | 3 | 1
(Netherlands) R Wassen (Slovakia) I Zelenay | 4 | 6^{2} | 6^{4}
5 | (Brazil) B Soares (Zimbabwe) K Ullyett | 6 | 7^{7} | 7^{7}

Quarterfinals
1 | (United States) B Bryan (United States) M Bryan | 6 | 6 | 6
5 | (Brazil) B Soares (Zimbabwe) K Ullyett | 2 | 1 | 4

==== Section 2 ====
First round
4 | (India) M Bhupathi (The Bahamas) M Knowles | 6^{4} | 6 | 7 | 7
Q | (South Africa) K Anderson (India) S Devvarman | 7^{7} | 4 | 5 | 5
(Germany) P Petzschner (Austria) A Peya | 6 | 6 | 6
LL | (Italy) A Motti (Australia) J Sirianni | 3 | 4 | 3
LL | (Australia) R Junaid (Germany) P Marx | 6 | 6 | 6
(Spain) G García López (Spain) I Navarro | 4 | 2 | 4
Q | (India) P Amritraj (Pakistan) A-u-H Qureshi | 6 | 6^{12} | 6 | 3 | 6
16 | (Australia) S Huss (United Kingdom) R Hutchins | 4 | 7^{14} | 4 | 6 | 3
9 | (South Africa) W Moodie (Belgium) D Norman | 3 | 6 | 6 | 6
WC | (United Kingdom) J Auckland (United Kingdom) J Goodall | 6 | 3 | 4 | 4
(Chinese Taipei) Y-h Lu (Germany) B Phau | 5 | 5 | 5
(Russia) I Andreev (Russia) E Korolev | 7 | 7 | 7
(Romania) A Pavel (Romania) H Tecău | 7^{7} | 6 | 6
LL | (Slovakia) K Beck (Czech Republic) J Levinský | 6^{1} | 4 | 4
(United States) E Butorac (United States) S Lipsky | 6 | 6 | 6
6 | (Poland) M Fyrstenberg (Poland) M Matkowski | 3 | 3 | 3

Second round
4 | (India) M Bhupathi (The Bahamas) M Knowles | 6 | 7 | 6^{5} | 6
(Germany) P Petzschner (Austria) A Peya | 3 | 5 | 7^{7} | 3
LL | (Australia) R Junaid (Germany) P Marx | 5 | 4 | 7^{7} | 7^{7} | 6
Q | (India) P Amritraj (Pakistan) A-u-H Qureshi | 7 | 6 | 6^{3} | 6^{3} | 8
9 | (South Africa) W Moodie (Belgium) D Norman | 7^{7} | 3 | 7^{7} | 6
(Russia) I Andreev (Russia) E Korolev | 6^{2} | 6 | 6^{5} | 4
(Romania) A Pavel (Romania) H Tecău | 6 | 6^{9} | 3 | 6 | 15
(United States) E Butorac (United States) S Lipsky | 4 | 7^{11} | 6 | 4 | 13

Third round
4 | (India) M Bhupathi (The Bahamas) M Knowles | 6 | 5 | 7^{7} | 6
Q | (India) P Amritraj (Pakistan) A-u-H Qureshi | 4 | 7 | 6^{3} | 0
9 | (South Africa) W Moodie (Belgium) D Norman | 3 | 6 | 6 | 6^{6} | 14
(Romania) A Pavel (Romania) H Tecău | 6 | 3 | 4 | 7^{8} | 12

Quarterfinals
4 | (India) M Bhupathi (The Bahamas) M Knowles | 6^{9} | 6 | 6^{7} | 7 | 4
9 | (South Africa) W Moodie (Belgium) D Norman | 7^{11} | 4 | 7^{9} | 5 | 6

=== Bottom half ===
==== Section 3 ====
First round
7 | (Belarus) M Mirnyi (Israel) A Ram | 6 | 3 | 6 | 3 | 10
Q | (Mexico) S González (United States) T Rettenmaier | 2 | 6 | 3 | 6 | 8
LL | (Thailand) Sa Ratiwatana (Thailand) So Ratiwatana | 6 | 6 | 6
(Argentina) S Roitman (Argentina) M Vassallo Argüello | 2 | 1 | 1
(Sweden) S Aspelin (Australia) P Hanley | 6 | 6 | 5 | 6
(Italy) F Fognini (Italy) P Starace | 1 | 4 | 7 | 4
(Uruguay) P Cuevas (Argentina) L Mayer | 7^{7} | 6^{4} | 3 | 6^{3}
10 | (United States) T Parrott (Slovakia) F Polášek | 6^{4} | 7^{7} | 6 | 7^{7}
15 | (Czech Republic) M Damm (Sweden) R Lindstedt | 6 | 6 | 6
(Argentina) J Acasuso (Argentina) S Prieto | 2 | 2 | 3
(United States) J Cerretani (Romania) V Hănescu | 7^{7} | 6 | 6
(Spain) Ó Hernández (Spain) A Montañés | 6^{5} | 4 | 3
(Austria) S Koubek (Israel) D Sela | 2 | 4 | 6 | 6^{3}
(France) A Clément (France) M Gicquel | 6 | 6 | 2 | 7^{7}
(United States) J Blake (United States) M Fish | 6 | 6 | 6
3 | (Czech Republic) L Dlouhý (India) L Paes | 4 | 4 | 3

Second round
7 | (Belarus) M Mirnyi (Israel) A Ram | 7^{7} | 6 | 6
LL | (Thailand) Sa Ratiwatana (Thailand) So Ratiwatana | 6^{5} | 4 | 3
(Sweden) S Aspelin (Australia) P Hanley | 7 | 6^{1} | 6 | 6
10 | (United States) T Parrott (Slovakia) F Polášek | 5 | 7^{7} | 2 | 3
15 | (Czech Republic) M Damm (Sweden) R Lindstedt | 6 | 6 | 6^{12} | 7
(United States) J Cerretani (Romania) V Hănescu | 3 | 3 | 7^{14} | 5
(France) A Clément (France) M Gicquel | 3 | 4 | 2
(United States) J Blake (United States) M Fish | 6 | 6 | 6

Third round
7 | (Belarus) M Mirnyi (Israel) A Ram | 2 | 7^{7} | 6^{5} | 7^{7} | 3
(Sweden) S Aspelin (Australia) P Hanley | 6 | 6^{3} | 7^{7} | 6^{2} | 6
15 | (Czech Republic) M Damm (Sweden) R Lindstedt | 3 | 6^{4} | 7^{7} | 4
(United States) J Blake (United States) M Fish | 6 | 7^{7} | 6^{4} | 6

Quarterfinals
(Sweden) S Aspelin (Australia) P Hanley | 6^{5} | 4 | 6^{5}
(United States) J Blake (United States) M Fish | 7^{7} | 6 | 7^{7}

==== Section 4 ====
First round
8 | (Poland) Ł Kubot (Austria) O Marach | 6 | 6 | 6
(United Kingdom) J Murray (Israel) J Erlich | 4 | 3 | 1
LL | (Australia) C Guccione (Germany) F Moser | 7^{7} | 6 | 6^{5} | 7
(Germany) B Becker (Germany) R Schüttler | 6^{4} | 4 | 7^{7} | 5
(Russia) I Kunitsyn (Russia) D Tursunov | 4 | 6^{1} | 3
(Germany) C Kas (Serbia) V Troicki | 6 | 7^{7} | 6
(United States) R Ram (Croatia) L Zovko | 4 | 6^{4} | 3
11 | (Brazil) M Melo (Brazil) A Sá | 6 | 7^{7} | 6
13 | (Czech Republic) F Čermák (Slovakia) M Mertiňák | 6 | 6 | 6
(Argentina) L Arnold Ker (Portugal) F Gil | 3 | 4 | 4
WC | (United Kingdom) J Delgado (United Kingdom) J Marray | 6 | 4
(Belgium) C Rochus (France) N Devilder | 1 | 1^{r}
(Austria) J Knowle (Austria) J Melzer | 3 | 6 | 4 | 4
(United States) S Querrey (United States) R Kendrick | 6 | 4 | 6 | 6
(Italy) S Bolelli (Italy) A Seppi | 4 | 2^{r}
2 | (Canada) D Nestor (Serbia) N Zimonjić | 6 | 4

Second round
8 | (Poland) Ł Kubot (Austria) O Marach | 6 | 6 | 3 | 7^{7}
LL | (Australia) C Guccione (Germany) F Moser | 2 | 4 | 6 | 6^{4}
(Germany) C Kas (Serbia) V Troicki | 7^{7} | 7 | 4 | 6
11 | (Brazil) M Melo (Brazil) A Sá | 6^{1} | 5 | 6 | 3
13 | (Czech Republic) F Čermák (Slovakia) M Mertiňák | 6 | 6^{5} | 7^{7} | 6^{9} | 2
WC | (United Kingdom) J Delgado (United Kingdom) J Marray | 2 | 7^{7} | 6^{4} | 7^{11} | 6
(United States) S Querrey (United States) R Kendrick | 6 | 3 | 4 | 4
2 | (Canada) D Nestor (Serbia) N Zimonjić | 3 | 6 | 6 | 6

Third round
8 | (Poland) Ł Kubot (Austria) O Marach | 6^{2} | 7^{7} | 6 | 6
(Germany) C Kas (Serbia) V Troicki | 7^{7} | 6^{4} | 1 | 3
WC | (United Kingdom) J Delgado (United Kingdom) J Marray | 5 | 4 | 4
2 | (Canada) D Nestor (Serbia) N Zimonjić | 7 | 6 | 6

Quarterfinals
8 | (Poland) Ł Kubot (Austria) O Marach | 2 | 3 | 4
2 | (Canada) D Nestor (Serbia) N Zimonjić | 6 | 6 | 6
