= 2009 Wimbledon Championships – Girls' singles =

Girls' singles
- 2009 Wimbledon Championships

Final
- Champion: (Thailand) Noppawan Lertcheewakarn
- Runner-up: (France) Kristina Mladenovic
- Score: 3–6, 6–3, 6–1

Details
- Draw: 64 (8 Q / 7 WC )
- Seeds: 16

Events
| Singles | men | women | | boys | girls |
| Doubles | men | women | mixed | boys | girls |
| WC Singles | men | women | quad |
| WC Doubles | men | women | quad |
| Legends | men | women | seniors |
| ← 2008 · | Wimbledon Championships | · 2010 → |

Laura Robson was the defending champion but lost in the third round to Quirine Lemoine.

Noppawan Lertcheewakarn defeated Kristina Mladenovic in the final, 3–6, 6–3, 6–1 to win the girls' singles tennis title at the 2009 Wimbledon Championships.

== Seeds ==
1. (France) Kristina Mladenovic (final)
2. (United Kingdom) Laura Robson (third round)
3. (Romania) Ana Bogdan (second round)
4. (Thailand) Noppawan Lertcheewakarn (champion)
5. (Australia) Olivia Rogowska (first round)
6. (Hungary) Tímea Babos (semifinals)
7. (United States) Sloane Stephens (quarterfinals)
8. (Croatia) Ajla Tomljanović (first round)
9. (United States) Christina McHale (first round)
10. (Chile) Camila Silva (third round)
11. (Croatia) Silvia Njirić (quarterfinals)
12. (United Kingdom) Heather Watson (first round)
13. (Belgium) Tamaryn Hendler (third round)
14. (South Africa) Chanel Simmonds (second round)
15. (Russia) Daria Gavrilova (second round)
16. (Norway) Ulrikke Eikeri (first round)

Click on the seed number of a player to go to their draw section.

== Draw ==
=== Key ===
- Q = Qualifier
- WC = Wild card
- LL = Lucky loser
- Alt = Alternate
- SE = Special exempt
- PR = Protected ranking
- ITF = ITF entry
- JE = Junior exempt
- w/o = Walkover
- r = Retired
- d = Defaulted
- SR = Special ranking

=== Finals ===
Quarterfinals
1 | (France) Kristina Mladenovic | 6 | 6
7 | (United States) Sloane Stephens | 1 | 0
(Hungary) Zsófia Susányi | 6 | 2 | 5
(Japan) Miyabi Inoue | 4 | 6 | 7
11 | (Croatia) Silvia Njirić | 4 | 4
4 | (Thailand) Noppawan Lertcheewakarn | 6 | 6
6 | (Hungary) Tímea Babos | 2 | 6 | 6
(Netherlands) Quirine Lemoine | 6 | 1 | 4

Semifinals
1 | (France) Kristina Mladenovic | 6 | 6
(Japan) Miyabi Inoue | 1 | 2
4 | (Thailand) Noppawan Lertcheewakarn | 6 | 6
6 | (Hungary) Tímea Babos | 2 | 0

Final
1 | (France) Kristina Mladenovic | 6 | 3 | 1
4 | (Thailand) Noppawan Lertcheewakarn | 3 | 6 | 6

=== Top half ===
==== Section 1 ====
First round
1 | (France) Kristina Mladenovic | 6 | 2 | 7
Q | (Canada) Eugénie Bouchard | 3 | 6 | 5
Q | (United States) Sachia Vickery | 6 | 6^{3} | 6
Q | (Thailand) Luksika Kumkhum | 4 | 7^{7} | 3
(Slovakia) Jana Čepelová | 2 | 1
Q | (Japan) Akiko Omae | 6 | 6
(United Kingdom) Hannah James | 2 | 2
15 | (Russia) Daria Gavrilova | 6 | 6
10 | (Chile) Camila Silva | 6 | 4 | 8
(Indonesia) Grace Sari Ysidora | 2 | 6 | 6
(Thailand) Khunpak Issara | 6 | 3 | 5
WC | (United Kingdom) Alexandra Walker | 3 | 6 | 7
(Australia) Isabella Holland | 3 | 4
LL | (Netherlands) Angelique van der Meet | 6 | 6
WC | (United Kingdom) Jocelyn Rae | 4 | 3
7 | (United States) Sloane Stephens | 6 | 6

Second round
1 | (France) K Mladenovic | 6 | 6
Q | (United States) S Vickery | 1 | 3
Q | (Japan) A Omae | 6 | 6
15 | (Russia) D Gavrilova | 2 | 3
10 | (Chile) C Silva | 6 | 7^{8}
WC | (United Kingdom) A Walker | 4 | 6^{6}
LL | (Netherlands) A van der Meet | 3 | 1
7 | (United States) S Stephens | 6 | 6

Third round
1 | (France) K Mladenovic | 6 | 7
Q | (Japan) A Omae | 3 | 5
10 | (Chile) C Silva | 2 | 6^{1}
7 | (United States) S Stephens | 6 | 7^{7}

Quarterfinals
1 | (France) K Mladenovic | 6 | 6
7 | (United States) S Stephens | 1 | 0

==== Section 2 ====
First round
3 | (Romania) Ana Bogdan | 6 | 6
(Poland) Magda Linette | 3 | 3
(Thailand) Natchanok Saenyaukhot | 0 | 1
(Netherlands) Richèl Hogenkamp | 6 | 6
(Italy) Martina Trevisan | 6 | 6
WC | (United Kingdom) Samantha Vickers | 1 | 0
(Hungary) Zsófia Susányi | 6 | 1 | 6
16 | (Norway) Ulrikke Eikeri | 4 | 6 | 0
12 | (United Kingdom) Heather Watson | 4 | 6 | 4
(Russia) Valeriya Solovyeva | 6 | 1 | 6
(Japan) Miyabi Inoue | 3 | 6 | 6
(Oman) Fatma Al-Nabhani | 6 | 4 | 2
(United States) Beatrice Capra | 6 | 6^{4} | 7
Q | (Belgium) An-Sophie Mestach | 3 | 7^{7} | 5
(Serbia) Tamara Čurović | 7 | 6
8 | (Croatia) Ajla Tomljanović | 5 | 2

Second round
3 | (Romania) A Bogdan | 6 | 1 | 4
(Netherlands) R Hogenkamp | 3 | 6 | 6
(Italy) M Trevisan | 4 | 1
(Hungary) Z Susányi | 6 | 6
(Russia) V Solovyeva | 3 | 6 | 4
(Japan) M Inoue | 6 | 3 | 6
(United States) B Capra | 7^{7} | 6
(Serbia) T Čurović | 6^{4} | 1

Third round
(Netherlands) R Hogenkamp | 2 | 6 | 3
(Hungary) Z Susányi | 6 | 3 | 6
(Japan) M Inoue | 6 | 6
(United States) B Capra | 2 | 3

Quarterfinals
(Hungary) Z Susányi | 6 | 2 | 5
(Japan) M Inoue | 4 | 6 | 7

=== Bottom half ===
==== Section 3 ====
First round
5 | (Australia) Olivia Rogowska | 3 | 1
(Netherlands) Lesley Kerkhove | 6 | 6
(Russia) Ksenia Kirillova | 6 | 6
(Paraguay) Verónica Cepede Royg | 2 | 1
(United Kingdom) Stephanie Cornish | 6 | 6
(Serbia) Aleksandra Krunić | 3 | 3
(United States) Nicole Gibbs | 2 | 6 | 4
11 | (Croatia) Silvia Njirić | 6 | 3 | 6
13/WC | (Belgium) Tamaryn Hendler | 6 | 6
(Japan) Emi Mutaguchi | 3 | 4
(Slovakia) Chantal Škamlová | 2 | 1
Q | (Romania) Ilinca Stoica | 6 | 6
WC | (United Kingdom) Jennifer Ren | 2 | 2
(Slovenia) Nastja Kolar | 6 | 6
(Mexico) Alejandra Granillo | 6 | 3 | 5
4 | (Thailand) Noppawan Lertcheewakarn | 3 | 6 | 7

Second round
(Netherlands) L Kerkhove | 4 | 6 | 6
(Russia) K Kirillova | 6 | 1 | 8
(United Kingdom) S Cornish | 2 | 4
11 | (Croatia) S Njirić | 6 | 6
13/WC | (Belgium) T Hendler | 6 | 6
Q | (Romania) I Stoica | 2 | 4
(Slovenia) N Kolar | 1 | 3
4 | (Thailand) N Lertcheewakarn | 6 | 6

Third round
(Russia) K Kirillova | 4 | 6 | 2
11 | (Croatia) S Njirić | 6 | 2 | 6
13/WC | (Belgium) T Hendler | 4 | 3
4 | (Thailand) N Lertcheewakarn | 6 | 6

Quarterfinals
11 | (Croatia) S Njirić | 4 | 4
4 | (Thailand) N Lertcheewakarn | 6 | 6

==== Section 4 ====
First round
6 | (Hungary) Tímea Babos | 6 | 4
WC | (United Kingdom) Tara Moore | 3 | 0^{r}
(Slovakia) Vivien Juhászová | 6 | 7
WC | (United Kingdom) Nicola George | 4 | 5
(Japan) Sachie Ishizu | 6 | 4 | 6
(Thailand) Nicha Lertpitaksinchai | 0 | 6 | 4
(Russia) Yana Buchina | 6 | 6
9 | (United States) Christina McHale | 4 | 3
14 | (South Africa) Chanel Simmonds | 6 | 6
(Ukraine) Maryna Zanevska | 4 | 2
(Russia) Polina Leykina | 6^{2} | 4
(Netherlands) Quirine Lemoine | 7^{7} | 6
Q | (Denmark) Malou Ejdesgaard | 2 | 3
Q | (Australia) Sally Peers | 6 | 6
(Canada) Katarena Paliivets | 3 | 2
2 | (United Kingdom) Laura Robson | 6 | 6

Second round
6 | (Hungary) T Babos | 6 | 4 | 6
(Slovakia) V Juhászová | 1 | 6 | 0
(Japan) S Ishizu | 6 | 3 | 3
(Russia) Y Buchina | 2 | 6 | 6
14 | (South Africa) C Simmonds | 7 | 4 | 4
(Netherlands) Q Lemoine | 5 | 6 | 6
Q | (Australia) S Peers | 3 | 2
2 | (United Kingdom) L Robson | 6 | 6

Third round
6 | (Hungary) T Babos | 7 | 6
(Russia) Y Buchina | 5 | 1
(Netherlands) Q Lemoine | 6 | 4 | 8
2 | (United Kingdom) L Robson | 2 | 6 | 6

Quarterfinals
6 | (Hungary) T Babos | 2 | 6 | 6
(Netherlands) Q Lemoine | 6 | 1 | 4
