= 2009 Wimbledon Championships – Women's singles =

Women's singles
- 2009 Wimbledon Championships

Final
- Champion: (United States) Serena Williams
- Runner-up: (United States) Venus Williams
- Score: 7–6^{(7–3)}, 6–2

Details
- Draw: 128 (12Q / 8WC)
- Seeds: 32

Events
Singles	men	women		boys	girls
Doubles	men	women	mixed	boys	girls
WC Singles	men	women	quad
WC Doubles	men	women	quad
Legends	men	women	seniors
- Wimbledon Championships

Serena Williams defeated the two-time defending champion, her sister Venus Williams, in a rematch of the previous year's final, 7–6^{(7–3)}, 6–2 to win the ladies' singles tennis title at the 2009 Wimbledon Championships. It was her third Wimbledon singles title and eleventh major singles title overall. It was the third time she won a major after saving a match point, which occurred in the semifinals against Elena Dementieva.

Venus Williams was attempting to become the first player to win the title three consecutive times since Steffi Graf in 1991, 1992 and 1993.

This edition of the tournament saw the top four seeds all reach the semifinals, the most recent occurrence of this at a major up until the 2026 US Open. The match between Serena Williams and Dementieva was the longest women's semifinal at Wimbledon in the Open Era, lasting two hours and 49 minutes, before being surpassed in 2024 by the semifinal between Jasmine Paolini and Donna Vekić.

== Seeds ==
1. (Russia) Dinara Safina (semifinals)
2. (United States) Serena Williams (champion)
3. (United States) Venus Williams (final)
4. (Russia) Elena Dementieva (semifinals)
5. (Russia) Svetlana Kuznetsova (third round)
6. (Serbia) Jelena Janković (third round)
7. (Russia) Vera Zvonareva (third round, withdrew due to an ankle injury)
8. (Belarus) Victoria Azarenka (quarterfinals)
9. (Denmark) Caroline Wozniacki (fourth round)
10. (Russia) Nadia Petrova (fourth round)
11. (Poland) Agnieszka Radwańska (quarterfinals)
12. (France) Marion Bartoli (third round)
13. (Serbia) Ana Ivanovic (fourth round, retired due to a thigh injury)
14. (Slovakia) Dominika Cibulková (third round)
15. (Italy) Flavia Pennetta (third round)
16. (China) Zheng Jie (second round)

17. (France) Amélie Mauresmo (fourth round)
18. (Australia) Samantha Stosur (third round)
19. (China) Li Na (third round)
20. (Spain) Anabel Medina Garrigues (third round)
21. (Switzerland) Patty Schnyder (first round)
22. (France) Alizé Cornet (first round)
23. (Canada) Aleksandra Wozniak (first round)
24. (Russia) Maria Sharapova (second round)
25. (Estonia) Kaia Kanepi (first round)
26. (France) Virginie Razzano (fourth round)
27. (Russia) Alisa Kleybanova (second round)
28. (Romania) Sorana Cîrstea (third round)
29. (Austria) Sybille Bammer (first round)
30. (Hungary) Ágnes Szávay (first round)
31. (Russia) Anastasia Pavlyuchenkova (second round)
32. (Russia) Anna Chakvetadze (first round)

Click on the seed number of a player to go to their draw section.

== Draw ==
Key

- Q = Qualifier
- WC = Wild card
- LL = Lucky loser
- Alt = Alternate
- ITF = ITF entry
- PR = Protected ranking
- SR = Special ranking
- SE = Special exempt
- JE = Junior exempt
- JR = Junior Accelerator Programme entrant
- CO = College Accelerator Programme entrant
- NG = Next Gen Accelerator Program entrant
- w/o = Walkover
- r = Retired
- d = Defaulted

=== Finals ===
Quarterfinals
1	(Russia) Dinara Safina	6^{5}	6	6
(Germany) Sabine Lisicki	7^{7}	4	1
3	(United States) Venus Williams	6	6
11	(Poland) Agnieszka Radwańska	1	2
(Italy) Francesca Schiavone	2	2
4	(Russia) Elena Dementieva	6	6
8	(Belarus) Victoria Azarenka	2	3
2	(United States) Serena Williams	6	6

Semifinals
1	(Russia) Dinara Safina	1	0
3	(United States) Venus Williams	6	6
4	(Russia) Elena Dementieva	7^{7}	5	6
2	(United States) Serena Williams	6^{4}	7	8

Final
3	(United States) Venus Williams	6^{3}	2
2	(United States) Serena Williams	7^{7}	6

=== Top half ===
==== Section 1 ====
First round
1	(Russia) D Safina	7	6
(Spain) L Domínguez Lino	5	3
(Czech Republic) N Vaidišová	4	7^{7}	4
(Paraguay) R de los Ríos	6	6^{4}	6
WC	(United Kingdom) E Baltacha	3	6	6
(Ukraine) A Bondarenko	6	3	4
(Belgium) K Flipkens	7	6
30	(Hungary) Á Szávay	5	4
17	(France) A Mauresmo	6	4	6
(Hungary) M Czink	1	6	2
LL	(Slovakia) K Kučová	2	6	6
Q	(Japan) A Nakamura	6	3	3
(United States) V King	6	6
(Ukraine) M Koryttseva	4	2
(Spain) N Llagostera Vives	6	1	0
15	(Italy) F Pennetta	3	6	6

Second round
1	(Russia) D Safina	6	7
(Paraguay) R de los Ríos	3	5
WC	(United Kingdom) E Baltacha	5	1
(Belgium) K Flipkens	7	6
17	(France) A Mauresmo	6	6
LL	(Slovakia) K Kučová	3	3
(United States) V King	2	2
15	(Italy) F Pennetta	6	6

Third round
1	(Russia) D Safina	7	6
(Belgium) K Flipkens	5	1
17	(France) A Mauresmo	7	6
15	(Italy) F Pennetta	5	3

Fourth round
1	(Russia) D Safina	4	6	6
17	(France) A Mauresmo	6	3	4

==== Section 2 ====
First round
9	(Denmark) C Wozniacki	5	6	6
WC	(Japan) K Date-Krumm	7	3	1
(Czech Republic) P Kvitová	4	4
(Russia) M Kirilenko	6	6
Q	(Italy) A Brianti	4	3
(Italy) T Garbin	6	6
(Poland) M Domachowska	6	3	4
20	(Spain) A Medina Garrigues	3	6	6
32	(Russia) A Chakvetadze	6	6^{4}	2
(Germany) S Lisicki	4	7^{7}	6
(Austria) P Mayr	7	6
(United Kingdom) A Keothavong	5	2
(France) P Parmentier	6	1	6
(Uzbekistan) A Amanmuradova	4	6	3
PR	(Japan) A Morigami	3	6^{1}
5	(Russia) S Kuznetsova	6	7^{7}

Second round
9	(Denmark) C Wozniacki	6	6
(Russia) M Kirilenko	0	4
(Italy) T Garbin	6^{5}	3
20	(Spain) A Medina Garrigues	7^{7}	6
(Germany) S Lisicki	6	6
(Austria) P Mayr	2	4
(France) P Parmentier	1	3
5	(Russia) S Kuznetsova	6	6

Third round
9	(Denmark) C Wozniacki	6	6
20	(Spain) A Medina Garrigues	2	2
(Germany) S Lisicki	6	7
5	(Russia) S Kuznetsova	2	5

Fourth round
9	(Denmark) C Wozniacki	4	4
(Germany) S Lisicki	6	6

==== Section 3 ====
First round
3	(United States) V Williams	6	6
(Switzerland) S Vögele	3	2
Q	(Latvia) A Sevastova	3	6^{5}
(Ukraine) K Bondarenko	6	7^{7}
(Russia) E Makarova	7	2	6
(Czech Republic) B Záhlavová-Strýcová	5	6	3
(Spain) C Suárez Navarro	4	6	6
25	(Estonia) K Kanepi	6	3	3
18	(Australia) S Stosur	6	6^{6}	6
(United States) B Mattek-Sands	4	7^{8}	2
(Australia) J Dokic	6	5	2
Q	(Germany) T Malek	3	7	6
(Italy) S Errani	7	6
(Canada) S Dubois	5	2
(Czech Republic) L Hradecká	7	2	6
13	(Serbia) A Ivanovic	5	6	8

Second round
3	(United States) V Williams	6	6
(Ukraine) K Bondarenko	3	2
(Russia) E Makarova	5	6	1
(Spain) C Suárez Navarro	7	4	6
18	(Australia) S Stosur	4	7^{8}	6
Q	(Germany) T Malek	6	6^{6}	4
(Italy) S Errani	5	1
13	(Serbia) A Ivanovic	7	6

Third round
3	(United States) V Williams	6	6
(Spain) C Suárez Navarro	0	4
18	(Australia) S Stosur	5	2
13	(Serbia) A Ivanovic	7	6

Fourth round
3	(United States) V Williams	6	0
13	(Serbia) A Ivanovic	1	1^{r}

==== Section 4 ====
First round
11	(Poland) A Radwańska	7	6
(Spain) MJ Martínez Sánchez	5	1
WC	(United States) A Glatch	4	6	4
(China) S Peng	6	2	6
(Belarus) O Govortsova	4	6	6
PR	(Ukraine) T Perebiynis	6	3	4
(Kazakhstan) G Voskoboeva	6^{5}	0
19	(China) N Li	7^{7}	6
29	(Austria) S Bammer	6	4	2
Q	(United States) M Oudin	4	6	6
(Romania) M Niculescu	1	0
(Kazakhstan) Y Shvedova	6	6
WC	(United Kingdom) K O'Brien	2	7	4
(Czech Republic) I Benešová	6	5	6
(Germany) J Görges	4	6^{0}
6	(Serbia) J Janković	6	7^{7}

Second round
11	(Poland) A Radwańska	6	6^{6}	9
(China) S Peng	2	7^{8}	7
(Belarus) O Govortsova	4	2
19	(China) N Li	6	6
Q	(United States) M Oudin	3	6	6
(Kazakhstan) Y Shvedova	6	2	4
(Czech Republic) I Benešová	2	4
6	(Serbia) J Janković	6	6

Third round
11	(Poland) A Radwańska	6	7
19	(China) N Li	4	5
Q	(United States) M Oudin	6^{8}	7	6
6	(Serbia) J Janković	7^{10}	5	2

Fourth round
11	(Poland) A Radwańska	6	7
Q	(United States) M Oudin	4	5

=== Bottom half ===
==== Section 5 ====
First round
7	(Russia) V Zvonareva	7^{7}	4	6
WC	(United Kingdom) G Stoop	6^{0}	6	4
WC	(United Kingdom) M South	5	6^{5}
(France) M Johansson	7	7^{7}
(United States) J Craybas	6	7
(Bulgaria) T Pironkova	4	5
(Austria) T Paszek	0	1^{r}
26	(France) V Razzano	6	3
23	(Canada) A Wozniak	6	4	4
(Italy) F Schiavone	4	6	6
WC	(Portugal) M Larcher de Brito	6	7
Q	(Czech Republic) K Zakopalová	2	5
(Switzerland) T Bacsinszky	6	4	8
Q	(Russia) V Manasieva	1	6	6
(Chinese Taipei) Y-j Chan	0	0
12	(France) M Bartoli	6	6

Second round
7	(Russia) V Zvonareva	6	6
(France) M Johansson	1	3
(United States) J Craybas	3	0
26	(France) V Razzano	6	6
(Italy) F Schiavone	7^{7}	7^{7}
WC	(Portugal) M Larcher de Brito	6^{2}	6^{4}
(Switzerland) T Bacsinszky	5	1
12	(France) M Bartoli	7	6

Third round
7	(Russia) V Zvonareva	w/o
26	(France) V Razzano
(Italy) F Schiavone	7^{7}	6
12	(France) M Bartoli	6^{5}	0

Fourth round
26	(France) V Razzano	2	6^{1}
(Italy) F Schiavone	6	7^{7}

==== Section 6 ====
First round
14	(Slovakia) D Cibulková	6	3	6
(France) J Coin	4	6	3
(Slovenia) M Zec Peškirič	3	3
(Poland) U Radwańska	6	6
(Belgium) Y Wickmayer	1	1
(Russia) E Vesnina	6	6
(Russia) V Dushevina	3	6	6
22	(France) A Cornet	6	0	4
27	(Russia) A Kleybanova	6	7
Q	(Kazakhstan) S Karatantcheva	2	5
(Croatia) K Šprem	6	5	3
Q	(Russia) R Kulikova	4	7	6
(France) A Rezaï	6	6
(Japan) A Morita	2	2
(Russia) A Kudryavtseva	4	1
4	(Russia) E Dementieva	6	6

Second round
14	(Slovakia) D Cibulková	6	6
(Poland) U Radwańska	2	4
(Russia) E Vesnina	6	6
(Russia) V Dushevina	3	4
27	(Russia) A Kleybanova	6	4	1
Q	(Russia) R Kulikova	0	6	6
(France) A Rezaï	1	3
4	(Russia) E Dementieva	6	6

Third round
14	(Slovakia) D Cibulková	5	6	4
(Russia) E Vesnina	7	4	6
Q	(Russia) R Kulikova	1	2
4	(Russia) E Dementieva	6	6

Fourth round
(Russia) E Vesnina	1	3
4	(Russia) E Dementieva	6	6

==== Section 7 ====
First round
8	(Belarus) V Azarenka	6	0
(France) S Brémond Beltrame	2	0^{r}
(France) N Dechy	6	6^{0}	2
(Romania) R Olaru	1	7^{7}	6
(Germany) A-L Grönefeld	2	6	2
(India) S Mirza	6	2	6
(Romania) E Gallovits	5	1
28	(Romania) S Cîrstea	7	6
24	(Russia) M Sharapova	7	6
Q	(Ukraine) V Kutuzova	5	4
(Argentina) G Dulko	6	7
(France) S Foretz	3	5
(Italy) ME Camerin	2	6^{3}
(Israel) S Pe'er	6	7^{7}
(Belarus) A Yakimova	1	1
10	(Russia) N Petrova	6	6

Second round
8	(Belarus) V Azarenka	6	6
(Romania) R Olaru	0	0
(India) S Mirza	4	4
28	(Romania) S Cîrstea	6	6
24	(Russia) M Sharapova	2	6	4
(Argentina) G Dulko	6	3	6
(Israel) S Pe'er	3	2
10	(Russia) N Petrova	6	6

Third round
8	(Belarus) V Azarenka	7^{7}	6
28	(Romania) S Cîrstea	6^{2}	3
(Argentina) G Dulko	6	3	4
10	(Russia) N Petrova	3	6	6

Fourth round
8	(Belarus) V Azarenka	7^{7}	2	6
10	(Russia) N Petrova	6^{5}	6	3

==== Section 8 ====
First round
16	(China) J Zheng	7^{7}	7^{7}
(Germany) K Barrois	6^{2}	6^{4}
(Slovakia) D Hantuchová	3	6	6
WC	(United Kingdom) L Robson	6	4	2
(Thailand) T Tanasugarn	4	4
Q	(Spain) A Parra Santonja	6	6
(Japan) A Sugiyama	6	6
21	(Switzerland) P Schnyder	4	4
31	(Russia) A Pavlyuchenkova	6	6
(Czech Republic) P Cetkovská	2	2
(Italy) R Vinci	6	6
(Slovakia) M Rybáriková	3	2
(Czech Republic) L Šafářová	3	6	3
(Australia) J Groth	6	3	6
Q	(Portugal) N Silva	1	5
2	(United States) S Williams	6	7

Second round
16	(China) J Zheng	3	5
(Slovakia) D Hantuchová	6	7
Q	(Spain) A Parra Santonja	6^{5}	3
(Japan) A Sugiyama	7^{7}	6
31	(Russia) A Pavlyuchenkova	4	6^{6}
(Italy) R Vinci	6	7^{8}
(Australia) J Groth	2	1
2	(United States) S Williams	6	6

Third round
(Slovakia) D Hantuchová	6	6
(Japan) A Sugiyama	4	3
(Italy) R Vinci	3	4
2	(United States) S Williams	6	6

Fourth round
(Slovakia) D Hantuchová	3	1
2	(United States) S Williams	6	6

== Championship match statistics ==
Category	(United States) S. Williams	(United States) V. Williams
1st serve %	33/54 (61%)	43/70 (61%)
1st serve points won	31 of 33 = 94%	30 of 43 = 70%
2nd serve points won	15 of 21 = 71%	15 of 27 = 56%
Total service points won	46 of 54 = 85.19%	45 of 70 = 64.29%
Aces	12	2
Double faults	0	3
Winners	25	14
Unforced errors	12	18
Net points won	4 of 4 = 100%	8 of 10 = 80%
Break points converted	2 of 5 = 40%	0 of 2 = 0%
Return points won	25 of 70 = 36%	8 of 54 = 15%
Total points won	71	53

Preceded by 2009 French Open – Women's singles	Grand Slam women's singles	Succeeded by 2009 US Open – Women's singles
