= 2010 Brazil Open Series – Doubles =

Doubles
- 2010 Brazil Open Series

Final
- Champions: (Germany) Dominik Meffert (Portugal) Leonardo Tavares
- Runners-up: (Paraguay) Ramón Delgado (Brazil) André Sá
- Score: 3–6, 6–2, [10–2]

Events
Singles	Doubles
- Brazil Open Series

Marcelo Demoliner and Rodrigo Guidolin were the defending champions, but Demoliner chose not to participate in doubles.
Guidolin partnered up with Fernando Romboli, but they lost in the quarterfinals against Dominik Meffert and Leonardo Tavares.
Dominik Meffert and Leonardo Tavares won in the final 3–6, 6–2, [10–2] against Ramón Delgado and André Sá.

== Seeds ==
1. (Brazil) Ricardo Hocevar / (Brazil) João Souza (quarterfinals)
2. (Germany) Dominik Meffert / (Portugal) Leonardo Tavares (champions)
3. (Spain) Carles Poch-Gradin / (Spain) Gabriel Trujillo-Soler (quarterfinals)
4. (Paraguay) Ramón Delgado / (Brazil) André Sá (final)

== Draw ==
Key

- Q = Qualifier
- WC = Wild card
- LL = Lucky loser
- Alt = Alternate
- ITF = ITF entry
- PR = Protected ranking
- SR = Special ranking
- SE = Special exempt
- JE = Junior exempt
- JR = Junior Accelerator Programme entrant
- CO = College Accelerator Programme entrant
- NG = Next Gen Accelerator Program entrant
- w/o = Walkover
- r = Retired
- d = Defaulted

=== Draw ===
First round
1	(Brazil) R Hocevar (Brazil) J Souza	6	3	[10]
(Brazil) F Ferreiro (Brazil) A Ghem	3	6	[7]
WC	(Brazil) R Cristo (Brazil) R Kompatscher	2	4
WC	(Brazil) M Daniel (Brazil) T Fernandes	6	6
4	(Paraguay) R Delgado (Brazil) A Sá	6	6
(Argentina) C Berlocq (Argentina) D Junqueira	3	4
(Brazil) R Dutra da Silva (Brazil) J Silva	6	6
(Argentina) M Alund (Argentina) F Bagnis	2	2
(Spain) G Alcaide (Spain) G Olaso	4	6	[2]
(Italy) S Vagnozzi (Brazil) C Zampieri	6	4	[10]
(Austria) A Haider-Maurer (Germany) B Knittel	6^{5}	5
3	(Spain) C Poch-Gradin (Spain) G Trujillo-Soler	7	7
(Brazil) R Guidolin (Brazil) F Romboli	6	6
WC	(Brazil) L Kirche (Brazil) A Miele	3	3
(Uruguay) M Felder (Argentina) A Molteni	0	2
2	(Germany) D Meffert (Portugal) L Tavares	6	6

Quarterfinals
1	(Brazil) R Hocevar (Brazil) J Souza	6	3	[4]
WC	(Brazil) M Daniel (Brazil) T Fernandes	1	6	[10]
4	(Paraguay) R Delgado (Brazil) A Sá	6	6
(Brazil) R Dutra da Silva (Brazil) J Silva	1	2
(Italy) S Vagnozzi (Brazil) C Zampieri	6	7
3	(Spain) C Poch-Gradin (Spain) G Trujillo-Soler	4	6^{7}
(Brazil) R Guidolin (Brazil) F Romboli	6	3	[1]
2	(Germany) D Meffert (Portugal) L Tavares	2	6	[10]

Semifinals
WC	(Brazil) M Daniel (Brazil) T Fernandes	3	0
4	(Paraguay) R Delgado (Brazil) A Sá	6	6
(Italy) S Vagnozzi (Brazil) C Zampieri	4	6^{8}
2	(Germany) D Meffert (Portugal) L Tavares	6	7

Finals
4	(Paraguay) R Delgado (Brazil) A Sá	6	2	[4]
2	(Germany) D Meffert (Portugal) L Tavares	3	6	[10]
