= 2010 Brazil Open Series – Singles =

Singles
- 2010 Brazil Open Series

Final
- Champion: (Germany) Dominik Meffert
- Runner-up: (Brazil) Ricardo Mello
- Score: 6–4, 6–7(3), 6–2

Events
| Singles | Doubles |
| ← 2009 · | Brazil Open Series | · 2011 → |

Ricardo Mello was the defending champion and he reached the final, but he lost to Dominik Meffert 4–6, 7–6(3), 2–6.

== Seeds ==
1. (Chile) Nicolás Massú (second round)
2. (Slovenia) Blaž Kavčič (first round)
3. (Brazil) Ricardo Mello (final)
4. (Brazil) Marcos Daniel (semifinals, retired)
5. (Brazil) Thiago Alves (semifinals)
6. (Brazil) João Souza (first round)
7. (Paraguay) Ramón Delgado (second round)
8. (Brazil) Júlio Silva (first round)

== Draw ==
=== Key ===
- Q = Qualifier
- WC = Wild card
- LL = Lucky loser
- Alt = Alternate
- SE = Special exempt
- PR = Protected ranking
- ITF = ITF entry
- JE = Junior exempt
- w/o = Walkover
- r = Retired
- d = Defaulted
- SR = Special ranking

=== Finals ===
Semifinals
(Germany) Dominik Meffert | 4
4 | (Brazil) Marcos Daniel | 0^{r}
3 | (Brazil) Ricardo Mello | 6 | 6
5 | (Brazil) Thiago Alves | 4 | 3

Final
(Germany) Dominik Meffert | 6 | 6^{3} | 6
3 | (Brazil) Ricardo Mello | 4 | 7 | 2

=== Top half ===
First round
1 | (Chile) N Massú | 6 | 5 | 6
WC | (Brazil) G Clezar | 4 | 7 | 2
WC | (Brazil) T Fernandes | 0 | 5
(Germany) D Meffert | 6 | 7
(Italy) S Vagnozzi | 6 | 6
Q | (Brazil) M Demoliner | 4 | 3
(Argentina) D Junqueira | 6 | 6
6 | (Brazil) J Souza | 4 | 3
4 | (Brazil) M Daniel | 6 | 6
(Brazil) A Ghem | 1 | 0
Q | (Peru) I Miranda | 6 | 6
SE | (Germany) B Knittel | 4 | 2
Q | (Slovenia) A Bedene | 7 | 6
(Spain) G Trujillo-Soler | 6^{5} | 3
(Spain) G Alcaide | 3 | 6 | 6
8 | (Brazil) J Silva | 6 | 4 | 3

Second round
1 | (Chile) N Massú | 2 | 4
(Germany) D Meffert | 6 | 6
(Italy) S Vagnozzi | 4 | 2
(Argentina) D Junqueira | 6 | 6
4 | (Brazil) M Daniel | 4 | 6 | 6
Q | (Peru) I Miranda | 6 | 3 | 4
Q | (Slovenia) A Bedene | 6^{8} | 2
(Spain) G Alcaide | 7 | 6

Quarterfinals
(Germany) D Meffert | 6 | 7
(Argentina) D Junqueira | 3 | 6^{4}
4 | (Brazil) M Daniel | 7 | 7
(Spain) G Alcaide | 6^{3} | 6^{6}

Semifinals
(Germany) D Meffert | 4
4 | (Brazil) M Daniel | 0^{r}

=== Bottom half ===
First round
7 | (Paraguay) R Delgado | 6 | 3 | 6
(Spain) G Olaso | 3 | 6 | 2
(Brazil) C Zampieri | 6 | 6
WC | (Brazil) T Takemoto | 3 | 3
(Brazil) R Hocevar | 6 | 3 | 7
WC | (Brazil) F Romboli | 1 | 6 | 6^{2}
(Argentina) M Alund | 3 | 2
3 | (Brazil) R Mello | 6 | 6
5 | (Brazil) T Alves | 6 | 3 | 7
(Morocco) R El Amrani | 4 | 6 | 5
SE | (Portugal) L Tavares | 6 | 3 | 2
(Argentina) C Berlocq | 2 | 6 | 6
Q | (Brazil) R Dutra da Silva | 2 | 4
(Austria) A Haider-Maurer | 6 | 6
(Uruguay) M Felder | 7 | 2 | 7
2 | (Slovenia) B Kavčič | 5 | 6 | 5

Second round
7 | (Paraguay) R Delgado | 6^{5} | 3
(Brazil) C Zampieri | 7 | 6
(Brazil) R Hocevar | 2 | 3
3 | (Brazil) R Mello | 6 | 6
5 | (Brazil) T Alves | 7 | 6
(Argentina) C Berlocq | 5 | 4
(Austria) A Haider-Maurer | 7 | 2 | 1
(Uruguay) M Felder | 6^{5} | 6 | 6

Quarterfinals
(Brazil) C Zampieri | 1 | 2
3 | (Brazil) R Mello | 6 | 6
5 | (Brazil) T Alves | 6 | 1 | 6
(Uruguay) M Felder | 2 | 6 | 4

Semifinals
3 | (Brazil) R Mello | 6 | 6
5 | (Brazil) T Alves | 4 | 3
