= 2004 Estoril Open – Men's doubles =

Men's doubles
- 2004 Estoril Open

Final
- Champions: (Argentina) Juan Ignacio Chela (Argentina) Gastón Gaudio
- Runners-up: (Czech Republic) František Čermák (Czech Republic) Leoš Friedl
- Score: 6–2, 6–1

Events
Singles	men	women
Doubles	men	women
← 2003 ·	Estoril Open	· 2005 →

Mahesh Bhupathi and Max Mirnyi were the defending champions but did not compete that year.

Juan Ignacio Chela and Gastón Gaudio won in the final 6–2, 6–1 against František Čermák and Leoš Friedl.

== Seeds ==
1. (Czech Republic) František Čermák / (Czech Republic) Leoš Friedl (final)
2. (Italy) Massimo Bertolini / (South Africa) Robbie Koenig (quarterfinals)
3. (Czech Republic) Petr Pála / (Czech Republic) Radek Štěpánek (first round)
4. (United States) Scott Humphries / (United States) Jared Palmer (first round)

== Draw ==
=== Key ===
- Q = Qualifier
- WC = Wild card
- LL = Lucky loser
- Alt = Alternate
- SE = Special exempt
- PR = Protected ranking
- ITF = ITF entry
- JE = Junior exempt
- w/o = Walkover
- r = Retired
- d = Defaulted
- SR = Special ranking

First round
1	(Czech Republic) F Čermák (Czech Republic) L Friedl	7^{7}	7
(Georgia (country)) I Labadze (Russia) M Safin	6^{2}	5
(Czech Republic) B Ulihrach (Czech Republic) J Vaněk	4	1
WC	(Portugal) F Gil (Portugal) B Mota	6	6
3	(Czech Republic) P Pála (Czech Republic) R Štěpánek	4	0
(Argentina) G Cañas (Argentina) M Zabaleta	6	6
(Argentina) L Arnold (Argentina) A Calleri	6	6
(Germany) F Mayer (Germany) R Schüttler	2	1
(Czech Republic) P Luxa (Netherlands) R Wassen	4	1
(Czech Republic) T Cibulec (Czech Republic) D Škoch	6	6
WC	(Portugal) T Godinho (Portugal) L Tavares	6	2	7^{7}
4	(United States) S Humphries (United States) J Palmer	3	6	6^{5}
(France) G Carraz (France) F Santoro	1	4
(Argentina) J I Chela (Argentina) G Gaudio	6	6
(Czech Republic) J Hernych (Czech Republic) T Zíb	1	1
2	(Italy) M Bertolini (South Africa) R Koenig	6	6

Quarterfinals
1	(Czech Republic) F Čermák (Czech Republic) L Friedl	6	6
WC	(Portugal) F Gil (Portugal) B Mota	4	3
(Argentina) G Cañas (Argentina) M Zabaleta	4	0
(Argentina) L Arnold (Argentina) A Calleri	6	6
(Czech Republic) T Cibulec (Czech Republic) D Škoch	6	6
WC	(Portugal) T Godinho (Portugal) L Tavares	1	2
(Argentina) J I Chela (Argentina) G Gaudio	6	6
2	(Italy) M Bertolini (South Africa) R Koenig	4	4

Semifinals
1	(Czech Republic) F Čermák (Czech Republic) L Friedl	4	6	6
(Argentina) L Arnold (Argentina) A Calleri	6	4	2
(Czech Republic) T Cibulec (Czech Republic) D Škoch	6	2	4
(Argentina) J I Chela (Argentina) G Gaudio	4	6	6

Final
1	(Czech Republic) F Čermák (Czech Republic) L Friedl	2	1
(Argentina) J I Chela (Argentina) G Gaudio	6	6
