= 2010 Brazil Open Series =

- Date: April 19 – April 25
- Edition: 2nd
- Location: Curitiba, Brazil

Champions

Singles
- (Germany) Dominik Meffert

Doubles
- (Germany) Dominik Meffert / (Portugal) Leonardo Tavares
← 2009 ·	Brazil Open Series	· 2011 →

The 2010 Brazil Open Series was a professional tennis tournament played on outdoor red clay courts. It was part of the 2010 ATP Challenger Tour. It took place in Curitiba, Brazil between 19 and 25 April 2010.

== ATP entrants ==
=== Seeds ===
Nationality	Player	Ranking*	Seeding
CHI	Nicolás Massú	93	1
SLO	Blaž Kavčič	119	2
BRA	Ricardo Mello	133	3
BRA	Marcos Daniel	136	4
BRA	Thiago Alves	148	5
BRA	João Souza	154	6
PAR	Ramón Delgado	165	7
BRA	Júlio Silva	166	8

- Rankings are as of April 5, 2010.

=== Other entrants ===
The following players received wildcards into the singles main draw:

- (Brazil) Guilherme Clézar
- (Brazil) Tiago Fernandes
- (Brazil) Fernando Romboli
- (Brazil) Thomas Takemoto

The following players received special exempt into the singles main draw:

- (Germany) Bastian Knittel
- (Portugal) Leonardo Tavares

The following players received entry from the qualifying draw:

- (Slovenia) Aljaž Bedene
- (Brazil) Marcelo Demoliner
- (Brazil) Rogério Dutra da Silva
- (Peru) Iván Miranda

== Champions ==
=== Singles ===
(Germany) Dominik Meffert def. (Brazil) Ricardo Mello, 6–4, 6–7(3), 6–2

=== Doubles ===
(Germany) Dominik Meffert / (Portugal) Leonardo Tavares def. (Paraguay) Ramón Delgado / (Brazil) André Sá, 3–6, 6–2, [10–2]
