= 2005 Estoril Open – Men's doubles =

Men's doubles
- 2005 Estoril Open

Final
- Champions: (Czech Republic) František Čermák (Czech Republic) Leoš Friedl
- Runners-up: (Argentina) Juan Ignacio Chela (Spain) Tommy Robredo
- Score: 6–3, 6–4

Events
Singles	men	women
Doubles	men	women
- Estoril Open

Juan Ignacio Chela and Gastón Gaudio were the defending champions. Chela participated with Tommy Robredo this year, finishing runner-up. Gaudio did not participate this year.

František Čermák and Leoš Friedl won in the final 6–3, 6–4, against Juan Ignacio Chela and Tommy Robredo.

== Seeds ==
1. (Sweden) Simon Aspelin / (Australia) Todd Perry (semifinals)
2. (Argentina) Gastón Etlis / (Argentina) Martin Rodríguez (first round)
3. (Czech Republic) František Čermák / (Czech Republic) Leoš Friedl (champions)
4. (Czech Republic) Jiří Novák / (Czech Republic) Petr Pála (first round)

== Draw ==
Key

- Q = Qualifier
- WC = Wild card
- LL = Lucky loser
- Alt = Alternate
- ITF = ITF entry
- PR = Protected ranking
- SR = Special ranking
- SE = Special exempt
- JE = Junior exempt
- JR = Junior Accelerator Programme entrant
- CO = College Accelerator Programme entrant
- NG = Next Gen Accelerator Program entrant
- w/o = Walkover
- r = Retired
- d = Defaulted

=== Draw ===
First round
1	(Sweden) S Aspelin (Australia) T Perry	6	6
WC	(Portugal) F Gil (Portugal) L Tavares	1	0
(Czech Republic) T Berdych (Czech Republic) J Levinský	6	7^{7}
(Spain) Á Calatrava (Chile) N Massú	2	6^{2}
3	(Czech Republic) F Čermák (Czech Republic) L Friedl	6	6
(Czech Republic) T Cibulec (Poland) M Fyrstenberg	1	2
WC	(Portugal) R Machado (Portugal) D Rocha	1	2
(Argentina) M García (Netherlands) R Wassen	6	6
(Australia) A Fisher (United States) J Thomas	2	4
(Germany) K Braasch (Poland) M Matkowski	6	6
(Argentina) JI Chela (Spain) T Robredo	7	1	7^{8}
4	(Czech Republic) J Novák (Czech Republic) P Pála	5	6	6^{6}
(Czech Republic) J Hernych (Czech Republic) J Vacek	1	6^{1}
Alt	(Spain) E Carril (Spain) G Fraile	6	7^{7}
(Denmark) K Carlsen (Croatia) I Karlović	6	6
2	(Argentina) G Etlis (Argentina) M Rodríguez	3	4

Quarterfinals
1	(Sweden) S Aspelin (Australia) T Perry	6^{3}	6	6
(Czech Republic) T Berdych (Czech Republic) J Levinský	7^{7}	3	4
3	(Czech Republic) F Čermák (Czech Republic) L Friedl	6	7^{7}
(Argentina) M García (Netherlands) R Wassen	1	6^{5}
(Germany) K Braasch (Poland) M Matkowski	7^{7}	3	2
(Argentina) JI Chela (Spain) T Robredo	6^{5}	6	6
Alt	(Spain) E Carril (Spain) G Fraile	3	6^{5}
(Denmark) K Carlsen (Croatia) I Karlović	6	7^{7}

Semifinals
1	(Sweden) S Aspelin (Australia) T Perry	6^{3}	2
3	(Czech Republic) F Čermák (Czech Republic) L Friedl	7^{7}	6
(Argentina) JI Chela (Spain) T Robredo	7	6
(Denmark) K Carlsen (Croatia) I Karlović	5	4

Final
3	(Czech Republic) F Čermák (Czech Republic) L Friedl	6	6
(Argentina) JI Chela (Spain) T Robredo	3	4
