= 2004 Estoril Open – Men's singles =

Men's singles
- 2004 Estoril Open

Final
- Champion: (Argentina) Juan Ignacio Chela
- Runner-up: (Russia) Marat Safin
- Score: 6–7^{(2–7)}, 6–3, 6–3

Details
- Draw: 32
- Seeds: 8

Events
Singles	men	women
Doubles	men	women
← 2003 ·	Estoril Open	· 2005 →

Nikolay Davydenko was the defending champion but lost in the first round to Radek Štěpánek.

Juan Ignacio Chela won in the final 6–7^{(2–7)}, 6–3, 6–3 against Marat Safin.

== Seeds ==
1. (Germany) Rainer Schüttler (first round)
2. (Chile) Nicolás Massú (first round)
3. (Argentina) Agustín Calleri (first round)
4. (Spain) Tommy Robredo (quarterfinals)
5. (Argentina) Juan Ignacio Chela (champion)
6. (Belarus) Max Mirnyi (second round)
7. (Argentina) Gastón Gaudio (first round)
8. (Russia) Marat Safin (final)

== Draw ==
=== Key ===
- Q = Qualifier
- WC = Wild card
- LL = Lucky loser
- Alt = Alternate
- SE = Special exempt
- PR = Protected ranking
- ITF = ITF entry
- JE = Junior exempt
- w/o = Walkover
- r = Retired
- d = Defaulted
- SR = Special ranking

=== Finals ===
Semifinals
Q	(Germany) Florian Mayer	3	3
5	(Argentina) Juan Ignacio Chela	6	6
8	(Russia) Marat Safin	2
(Georgia (country)) Irakli Labadze	3^{r}

Final
5	(Argentina) Juan Ignacio Chela	6^{2}	6	6
8	(Russia) Marat Safin	7^{7}	3	3

=== Top half ===
First round
1	(Germany) R Schüttler	6^{4}	7^{7}	3
(Romania) V Hănescu	7^{7}	6^{4}	6
(Belgium) O Rochus	6	7
(France) G Carraz	4	5
(Czech Republic) R Štěpánek	7^{7}	6
(Russia) N Davydenko	6^{3}	3
Q	(Germany) F Mayer	6	6
7	(Argentina) G Gaudio	3	4
3	(Argentina) A Calleri	6^{3}	6	6^{3}
Q	(Czech Republic) J Vaněk	7^{7}	3	7^{7}
(France) J Boutter	6	2	4
(France) O Patience	3	6	6
WC	(Portugal) D Rocha	7	2	6
WC	(Portugal) L Tavares	5	6	3
WC	(Argentina) G Cañas	3	4
5	(Argentina) J I Chela	6	6

Second round
(Romania) V Hănescu	6	6
(Belgium) O Rochus	3	0
(Czech Republic) R Štěpánek	4	2
Q	(Germany) F Mayer	6	6
Q	(Czech Republic) J Vaněk	3	2
(France) O Patience	6	6
WC	(Portugal) D Rocha	0	0^{r}
5	(Argentina) J I Chela	6	2

Quarterfinals
(Romania) V Hănescu	4	3
Q	(Germany) F Mayer	6	6
(France) O Patience	3	2
5	(Argentina) J I Chela	6	6

Semifinals
Q	(Germany) F Mayer	3	3
5	(Argentina) J I Chela	6	6

=== Bottom half ===
First round
8	(Russia) M Safin	5	6	6
(France) C Saulnier	7	2	2
(France) A Dupuis	6^{5}	0
(France) T Ascione	7^{7}	6
Q	(Greece) V Mazarakis	6	1	2
(Argentina) M Zabaleta	3	6	6
(Belgium) X Malisse	0	0^{r}
4	(Spain) T Robredo	6	0
6	(Belarus) M Mirnyi	7^{7}	6
(Czech Republic) B Ulihrach	6^{2}	3
Q	(Hungary) A Sávolt	6	4	5
(Georgia (country)) I Labadze	4	6	7
(Croatia) G Ivanišević	4	1
(Spain) R Nadal	6	6
(France) R Gasquet	0	7^{7}	7^{7}
2	(Chile) N Massú	6	6^{2}	6^{5}

Second round
8	(Russia) M Safin	6	6
(France) T Ascione	4	4
(Argentina) M Zabaleta	1	6^{6}
4	(Spain) T Robredo	6	7^{8}
6	(Belarus) M Mirnyi	3	3
(Georgia (country)) I Labadze	6	6
(Spain) R Nadal	6	3	6
(France) R Gasquet	4	6	2

Quarterfinals
8	(Russia) M Safin	7^{7}	2	7^{7}
4	(Spain) T Robredo	6^{2}	6	6^{5}
(Georgia (country)) I Labadze	w/o
(Spain) R Nadal

Semifinals
8	(Russia) M Safin	2
(Georgia (country)) I Labadze	3^{r}
