= 2010 Weil Tennis Academy Challenger – Singles =

Singles
- 2010 Weil Tennis Academy Challenger

Final
- Champion: (United States) Bobby Reynolds
- Runner-up: (Australia) Marinko Matosevic
- Score: 3–6, 7–5, 7–5

Events
Singles	Doubles
- Weil Tennis Academy Challenger

Bobby Reynolds won in the final, 3-6, 7-5, 7-5 against Marinko Matosevic.

== Seeds ==
1. (United States) Ryan Sweeting (second round)
2. (Argentina) Brian Dabul (semifinals, retired)
3. (United States) Kevin Kim (first round)
4. (United States) Donald Young (semifinals)
5. (United States) Michael Yani (withdrew due to elbow injury)
6. (United States) Robert Kendrick (first round)
7. (Republic of Ireland) Conor Niland (first round)
8. (United States) Alex Kuznetsov (second round)

== Draw ==
Key

- Q = Qualifier
- WC = Wild card
- LL = Lucky loser
- Alt = Alternate
- ITF = ITF entry
- PR = Protected ranking
- SR = Special ranking
- SE = Special exempt
- JE = Junior exempt
- JR = Junior Accelerator Programme entrant
- CO = College Accelerator Programme entrant
- NG = Next Gen Accelerator Program entrant
- w/o = Walkover
- r = Retired
- d = Defaulted

=== Finals ===
Semifinals
WC	(United States) Bobby Reynolds	6	6
4/WC	(United States) Donald Young	3	2
(Australia) Marinko Matosevic	4
2	(Argentina) Brian Dabul	3^{r}

Final
WC	(United States) Bobby Reynolds	3	7	7
(Australia) Marinko Matosevic	6	5	5

=== Top half ===
First round
1	(United States) R Sweeting	6	6
(Dominican Republic) V Estrella	3	1
Q	(United States) Greg Ouellette	1	7	1
(Chile) P Capdeville	6	6^{5}	6
WC	(United States) B Reynolds	6	6
WC	(United States) S Bangoura	2	1
(Russia) A Sitak	4	6^{2}
8	(United States) A Kuznetsov	6	7
4/WC	(United States) D Young	6	6
(Portugal) L Tavares	3	2
(Sweden) M Ryderstedt	4	6^{3}
LL	(Australia) Dayne Kelly	6	7
(Canada) M Raonic	6	6
(Japan) T Suzuki	3	3
(Slovenia) L Gregorc	6	6
7	(Republic of Ireland) C Niland	4	4

Second round
1	(United States) R Sweeting	3	6^{4}
(Chile) P Capdeville	6	7
WC	(United States) B Reynolds	6	6
8	(United States) A Kuznetsov	4	2
4/WC	(United States) D Young	7	2	7
LL	(Australia) D Kelly	5	6	5
(Canada) M Raonic	3	6	1
(Slovenia) L Gregorc	6	3	6

Quarterfinals
(Chile) P Capdeville	6	4	5
WC	(United States) B Reynolds	2	6	7
4/WC	(United States) D Young	2	6	6
(Slovenia) L Gregorc	6	1	4

Semifinals
WC	(United States) B Reynolds	6	6
4/WC	(United States) D Young	3	2

=== Bottom half ===
First round
6	(United States) R Kendrick	6	3	6^{2}
Q	(Canada) P Bester	2	6	7
Q	(United States) N Monroe	6^{4}	3
(United States) T Smyczek	7	6
ALT	(Canada) P-L Duclos	5	0
(Canada) P Polansky	7	6
(Australia) M Matosevic	6	6
3	(United States) K Kim	1	0
LL	(Australia) M Reid	6	4	2
(United States) L Cook	4	6	6
(South Africa) I van der Merwe	7	6^{6}	6
WC	(United States) S Johnson	5	7	3
Q	(Philippines) C Mamiit	1	7	6^{2}
(Australia) S Groth	6	5	7
(New Zealand) J Statham	6	6^{6}	6^{5}
2	(Argentina) B Dabul	2	7	7

Second round
Q	(Canada) P Bester	3	1
(United States) T Smyczek	6	6
(Canada) P Polansky	5	4
(Australia) M Matosevic	7	6
(United States) L Cook	6	6
(South Africa) I van der Merwe	4	4
(Australia) S Groth	4	1^{r}
2	(Argentina) B Dabul	6	1

Quarterfinals
(United States) T Smyczek	2	2
(Australia) M Matosevic	6	6
(United States) L Cook	3	4
2	(Argentina) B Dabul	6	6

Semifinals
(Australia) M Matosevic	4
2	(Argentina) B Dabul	3^{r}

== General references ==
- Main Draw
- Qualifying Singles
