= Tiago Godinho =

Portuguese tennis player (born 1984)

- Country (sports): Portugal
- Residence: Lisbon, Portugal
- Born: 13 August 1984 (age 41)
- Turned pro: 2001
- Retired: 2008
- Plays: Right-handed
- Coach: Pedro Bivar; Sotero Rebelo
- Prize money: $11,288

Singles
- Career record: 0–1
- Career titles: 0
- Highest ranking: No. 750 (14 July 2003)

Doubles
- Career record: 1–1
- Career titles: 0
- Highest ranking: No. 461 (7 June 2004)

Tiago Godinho (born 13 August 1984) is a Portuguese former professional tennis player who competed in the ITF Men's Circuit. He achieved his highest singles ranking of 750 in the world by the Association of Tennis Professionals (ATP) in July 2003. Though he never entered a singles event in the ATP Challenger Tour, Godinho did play in the doubles event at the 2004 Estoril Open and was selected for one Davis Cup tie in 2002.

== Career finals ==
=== ITF Men's Circuit ===
==== Doubles: 5 (2 titles, 3 runner-ups) ====
Legend Futures (1–3) Satellites (1–0)	Titles by surface Hard (0–2) Clay (2–1) Grass (0–0) Carpet (0–0)	Titles by setting Outdoors (2–3) Indoors (0–0)

Result	Date	Category	Tournament	Surface	Partner	Opponents	Score
Runner-up	17 November 2002	Futures	Nonthaburi, Thailand F2	Hard	(Portugal) Leonardo Tavares	(Japan) Hiroki Kondo (Japan) Michihisa Onoda	3–6, 2–6
Runner-up	24 November 2002	Futures	Hanoi, Vietnam F1	Hard	(Portugal) Leonardo Tavares	(South Africa) Johan Du Randt (South Africa) Dirk Stegmann	5–7, 6–7^{(2–7)}
Winner	28 June 2003	Futures	Lisbon, Portugal F10	Clay	(Portugal) António van Grichen	(Portugal) Jorge Laranjeiro (Portugal) Leonardo Tavares	6–4, 6–4
Winner	29 May 2004	Satellites	Sofia, Bulgaria 1	Clay	(Portugal) Frederico Gil	(North Macedonia) Lazar Magdinčev (North Macedonia) Predrag Rusevski	6–2, 3–6, 7–5
Runner-up	4 July 2008	Futures	Alicante, Spain F25	Clay	(Portugal) Pedro Sousa	(Spain) David Ollivier (Spain) Carlos Rexach-Itoiz	5–7, 1–6

== National participation ==
=== Davis Cup (0 wins, 1 loss) ===
Godinho played 1 match in 1 tie for the Portugal Davis Cup team in 2002. His singles record was 0–1 and his doubles record was 0–0 (0–1 overall).

Group membership World Group (0–0) WG Play-off (0–0) Group I (0–1) Group II (0–0) Group III (0–0) Group IV (0–0)	Matches by surface Hard (0–0) Clay (0–0) Grass (0–0) Carpet (0–1)	Matches by Type Singles (0–1) Doubles (0–0)	Matches by Setting Indoors (0–1) Outdoors (0–0)	Matches by Venue Portugal (0–0) Away (0–1)

- ▲ ▼ indicates the result of the Davis Cup match followed by the score, date, place of event, the zonal classification and its phase, and the court surface.

Rubber result	Rubber	Match type (partner if any)	Opponent nation	Opponent player(s)	Score
▼1–4; 20–22 September 2002; Follonica T.C., Follonica, Italy; Group I Europe/Africa Relegation Play-off; Carpet(i) surface
Defeat	V	Singles (dead rubber)	Italy	Stefano Galvani	4–6, 1–6
