= 2003 Estoril Open – Men's singles =

Men's singles
- 2003 Estoril Open

Final
- Champion: (Russia) Nikolay Davydenko
- Runner-up: (Argentina) Agustín Calleri
- Score: 6–4, 6–3

Details
- Draw: 32 (3WC/4Q/2LL)
- Seeds: 8

Events
Singles	men	women
Doubles	men	women
← 2002 ·	Estoril Open	· 2004 →

David Nalbandian was the defending champion but did not compete that year.

Nikolay Davydenko won in the final 6–4, 6–3 against Agustín Calleri.

== Seeds ==
1. (Czech Republic) Jiří Novák (first round)
2. (Germany) Rainer Schüttler (first round)
3. (Netherlands) Sjeng Schalken (first round)
4. (Chile) Fernando González (quarterfinals)
5. (Spain) Tommy Robredo (semifinals)
6. (Russia) Yevgeny Kafelnikov (quarterfinals)
7. (Belarus) Max Mirnyi (semifinals)
8. (Finland) Jarkko Nieminen (second round)

== Draw ==
=== Key ===
- Q = Qualifier
- WC = Wild card
- LL = Lucky loser
- Alt = Alternate
- ITF = ITF entry
- PR = Protected ranking
- SR = Special ranking
- SE = Special exempt
- JE = Junior exempt
- JR = Junior Accelerator Programme entrant
- CO = College Accelerator Programme entrant
- NG = Next Gen Accelerator Program entrant
- w/o = Walkover
- r = Retired
- d = Defaulted

=== Finals ===
Semifinals
5	(Spain) Tommy Robredo	4	2
(Argentina) Agustín Calleri	6	6
(Russia) Nikolay Davydenko	6	3	6
7	(Belarus) Max Mirnyi	4	6	3

Final
(Argentina) Agustín Calleri	4	3
(Russia) Nikolay Davydenko	6	6

=== Top half ===
First round
1	(Czech Republic) J Novák	7^{7}	4	5
(Netherlands) J van Lottum	6^{5}	6	7
Q	(Spain) F Verdasco	6^{3}	6	4
LL	(Spain) G Blanco	7^{7}	1	6
Q	(Israel) H Levy	6	7^{7}
(Netherlands) M Verkerk	3	6^{4}
(Italy) A Gaudenzi	3	1
5	(Spain) T Robredo	6	6
4	(Chile) F González	6	4	6
(Spain) D Ferrer	2	6	4
(Argentina) J Acasuso	6	6
(Spain) D Sánchez	3	4
(Argentina) A Calleri	6	6
WC	(Portugal) D Rocha	1	0
WC	(Portugal) H Lopes	6	1	1
8	(Finland) J Nieminen	4	6	6

Second round
(Netherlands) J van Lottum	1	3
LL	(Spain) G Blanco	6	6
Q	(Israel) H Levy	3	1
5	(Spain) T Robredo	6	6
4	(Chile) F González	6	6
(Argentina) J Acasuso	1	3
(Argentina) A Calleri	6	6
8	(Finland) J Nieminen	3	4

Quarterfinals
LL	(Spain) G Blanco	2	3
5	(Spain) T Robredo	6	6
4	(Chile) F González	5	1
(Argentina) A Calleri	7	6

Semifinals
5	(Spain) T Robredo	4	2
(Argentina) A Calleri	6	6

=== Bottom half ===
First round
6	(Russia) N Davydenko	6	6
(Georgia (country)) I Labadze	1	0
(Australia) W Arthurs	6	5	6^{1}
(Romania) A Voinea	3	7	7^{7}
(Germany) A Waske	6	5	6
LL	(Argentina) G Etlis	2	7	4
(Russia) N Davydenko	6	6
3	(Netherlands) S Schalken	3	2
7	(Belarus) M Mirnyi	6	4	7
(Spain) A Martín	0	6	5
Q	(Romania) V Hănescu	6	6
Q	(Belgium) C Rochus	3	2
(Netherlands) R Sluiter	6^{1}	6	6^{3}
WC	(Portugal) B Mota	7^{7}	3	7^{7}
(Spain) F López	6	4	7
2	(Germany) R Schüttler	1	6	5

Second round
6	(Russia) Y Kafelnikov	6	6
(Romania) A Voinea	3	0
(Germany) A Waske	3	6^{3}
(Russia) N Davydenko	6	7^{7}
7	(Belarus) M Mirnyi	3	6	6
Q	(Romania) V Hănescu	6	3	4
WC	(Portugal) B Mota	3	4
(Spain) F López	6	6

Quarterfinals
6	(Russia) Y Kafelnikov	2	4
(Russia) N Davydenko	6	6
7	(Belarus) M Mirnyi	7^{7}	6
(Spain) F López	6^{0}	4

Semifinals
(Russia) N Davydenko	6	3	6
7	(Belarus) M Mirnyi	4	6	3

== Qualifying ==
=== Qualifying seeds ===
1. (Spain) Galo Blanco (qualifying competition, retired due to a stiff neck, lucky loser)
2. (Russia) Andrei Stoliarov (second round)
3. (Belgium) Christophe Rochus (qualified)
4. (Spain) Fernando Verdasco (qualified)
5. (Czech Republic) Tomáš Zíb (second round)
6. (Belgium) Dick Norman (second round)
7. (Costa Rica) Juan Antonio Marín (first round)
8. (Romania) Victor Hănescu (qualified)

=== Qualifiers ===
1. (Israel) Harel Levy
2. (Romania) Victor Hănescu
3. (Belgium) Christophe Rochus
4. (Spain) Fernando Verdasco

=== Lucky losers ===
1. (Spain) Galo Blanco
2. (Argentina) Gastón Etlis

=== Qualifying draw ===
==== First qualifier ====
First round
1	(Spain) Galo Blanco	6	6
WC	(Portugal) Pedro Leão	1	1
(France) Sébastien de Chaunac	3	3
(France) Julien Benneteau	6	6
(Israel) Harel Levy	1	6	7^{8}
(Spain) Didac Pérez	6	2	6^{6}
(France) Florent Serra	0	2
5	(Czech Republic) Tomáš Zíb	6	6

Second round
1	(Spain) Galo Blanco	6	6
(France) Julien Benneteau	2	4
(Israel) Harel Levy	7	6
5	(Czech Republic) Tomáš Zíb	5	4

Qualifying competition
1	(Spain) Galo Blanco	5	r
(Israel) Harel Levy	7

==== Second qualifier ====
First round
2	(Russia) Andrei Stoliarov	1	6	6
(Norway) Jan Frode Andersen	6	3	4
(Brazil) Francisco Costa	1	2
(Spain) Óscar Serrano	6	6
WC	(Portugal) Rui Machado	6^{9}	3
(Czech Republic) Pavel Šnobel	7^{11}	6
(Spain) Marc Fornell Mestres	3	7	2
8	(Romania) Victor Hănescu	6	5	6

Second round
2	(Russia) Andrei Stoliarov	3	2
(Spain) Óscar Serrano	6	6
(Czech Republic) Pavel Šnobel	4	2
8	(Romania) Victor Hănescu	6	6

Qualifying competition
(Spain) Óscar Serrano	1	6	2
8	(Romania) Victor Hănescu	6	2	6

==== Third qualifier ====
First round
3	(Belgium) Christophe Rochus	6	6
(Spain) Álex Calatrava	2	2
(Czech Republic) Jan Hájek	6	7^{7}
WC	(Portugal) Peter Rodrigues	0	6^{1}
(Germany) David Prinosil	7	6
WC	(Portugal) Frederico Gil	5	0
(Argentina) Gastón Etlis	7^{7}	6
7	(Costa Rica) Juan Antonio Marín	6^{4}	3

Second round
3	(Belgium) Christophe Rochus	3	6	6
(Czech Republic) Jan Hájek	6	4	4
(Germany) David Prinosil	1	2
(Argentina) Gastón Etlis	6	6

Qualifying competition
3	(Belgium) Christophe Rochus	7	6^{3}	6
(Argentina) Gastón Etlis	5	7^{7}	4

==== Fourth qualifier ====
First round
4	(Spain) Fernando Verdasco	6	6
(Belgium) Gilles Elseneer	3	3
(Germany) Marc-Kevin Goellner	3	7	6
(Spain) Juan Giner	6	5	3
(Germany) Denis Gremelmayr	4	4
(Germany) Christopher Kas	6	6
(Serbia and Montenegro) Boris Pašanski	1	7	2
6	(Belgium) Dick Norman	6	5	6

Second round
4	(Spain) Fernando Verdasco	6	6
(Germany) Marc-Kevin Goellner	2	1
(Germany) Christopher Kas	4	7	6
6	(Belgium) Dick Norman	6	5	1

Qualifying competition
4	(Spain) Fernando Verdasco	6	6
(Germany) Christopher Kas	3	3
