= 2003 Estoril Open – Women's singles =

Women's singles
- 2003 Estoril Open

Final
- Champion: (Spain) Magüi Serna
- Runner-up: (Germany) Julia Schruff
- Score: 6–4, 6–1

Details
- Draw: 32 (2WC/4Q/3LL/1PR)
- Seeds: 8

Events
Singles	men	women
Doubles	men	women
← 2002 ·	Estoril Open	· 2004 →

Magüi Serna was the defending champion and successfully defended her title, by defeating qualifier Julia Schruff 6–4, 6–1 in the final.

== Seeds ==
1. (Slovenia) Katarina Srebotnik (second round)
2. (Spain) Magüi Serna (champion)
3. (France) Virginie Razzano (semifinals)
4. (Italy) Rita Grande (first round, retired)
5. (Slovakia) Henrieta Nagyová (second round, retired)
6. (Czech Republic) Klára Koukalová (first round)
7. (Austria) Patricia Wartusch (first round)
8. (Czech Republic) Iveta Benešová (second round)

== Draw ==
=== Key ===
- Q = Qualifier
- WC = Wild card
- LL = Lucky loser
- Alt = Alternate
- SE = Special exempt
- PR = Protected ranking
- ITF = ITF entry
- JE = Junior exempt
- w/o = Walkover
- r = Retired
- d = Defaulted
- SR = Special ranking

=== Finals ===
Semifinals
Q	(Germany) Julia Schruff	6	6
(Switzerland) Emmanuelle Gagliardi	3	4
3	(France) Virginie Razzano	0	1
2	(Spain) Magüi Serna	6	6

Final
Q	(Germany) Julia Schruff	4	1
2	(Spain) Magüi Serna	6	6

=== Top half ===
First round
1	(Slovenia) K Srebotnik	6	6
Q	(Spain) A Parra Santonja	4	4
Q	(Germany) J Schruff	7	6
Q	(Argentina) ME Salerni	5	1
(Slovakia) Ľ Cervanová	6	6
Q	(Estonia) M Ani	3	4
(Belarus) T Poutchek	3	1
8	(Czech Republic) I Benešová	6	6
4	(Italy) R Grande	3^{r}
(Switzerland) E Gagliardi	6
(Germany) A Rösch	7	4	4
(Croatia) J Kostanić	5	6	6
(Paraguay) R de los Ríos	3	6	3
(Spain) M Marrero	6	3	3^{r}
(Croatia) S Talaja	6	6
6	(Czech Republic) K Koukalová	4	4

Second round
1	(Slovenia) K Srebotnik	4	6	3
Q	(Germany) J Schruff	6	3	6
(Slovakia) Ľ Cervanová	6	6
8	(Czech Republic) I Benešová	3	2
(Switzerland) E Gagliardi	6	7^{8}
(Croatia) J Kostanić	2	6^{6}
(Paraguay) R de los Ríos	6	2	1
(Croatia) S Talaja	3	6	6

Quarterfinals
Q	(Germany) J Schruff	7	6
(Slovakia) Ľ Cervanová	5	3
(Switzerland) E Gagliardi	6	7^{7}
(Croatia) S Talaja	4	6^{4}

Semifinals
Q	(Germany) J Schruff	6	6
(Switzerland) E Gagliardi	3	4

=== Bottom half ===
First round
5	(Slovakia) H Nagyová	6	6
(Spain) C Martínez Granados	1	3
LL	(Argentina) G Dulko	6	6
LL	(Czech Republic) S Kleinová	4	4
(Italy) A Serra Zanetti	1	7	3
PR	(Spain) A Medina Garrigues	6	5	6
(Germany) B Rittner	6^{5}	0
3	(France) V Razzano	7^{7}	6
7	(Austria) P Wartusch	7	3	4
(Spain) M Sánchez Lorenzo	5	6	6
WC	(Russia) M Kirilenko	2	3
(France) S Cohen-Aloro	6	6
(Hungary) P Mandula	6	6
WC	(Portugal) F Piedade	1	3
LL	(Ukraine) E Tatarkova	3	1
2	(Spain) M Serna	6	6

Second round
5	(Slovakia) H Nagyová	1^{r}
LL	(Argentina) G Dulko	5
PR	(Spain) A Medina Garrigues	6	4	4
3	(France) V Razzano	4	6	6
(Spain) M Sánchez Lorenzo	4	6	2
(France) S Cohen-Aloro	6	2	6
(Hungary) P Mandula	5	0
2	(Spain) M Serna	7	6

Quarterfinals
LL	(Argentina) G Dulko	6^{4}	4
3	(France) V Razzano	7^{7}	6
(France) S Cohen-Aloro	3	2
2	(Spain) M Serna	6	6

Semifinals
3	(France) V Razzano	0	1
2	(Spain) M Serna	6	6

== Qualifying ==
=== Qualifying seeds ===
1. (Slovakia) Martina Suchá (second round)
2. (Israel) Tzipora Obziler (first round)
3. (Luxembourg) Claudine Schaul (first round)
4. (Czech Republic) Alena Vašková (second round)
5. (Czech Republic) Sandra Kleinová (qualifying competition, lucky loser)
6. (Federal Republic of Yugoslavia) Jelena Janković (second round)
7. (Spain) Gala León García (first round)
8. (Hungary) Melinda Czink (first round)

=== Qualifiers ===
1. (Spain) Arantxa Parra Santonja
2. (Argentina) María Emilia Salerni
3. (Germany) Julia Schruff
4. (Estonia) Maret Ani

=== Lucky losers ===
1. (Ukraine) Elena Tatarkova
2. (Czech Republic) Sandra Kleinová
3. (Argentina) Gisela Dulko

=== Protected ranking ===
1. (Spain) Anabel Medina Garrigues

=== Qualifying draw ===
==== First qualifier ====
First round
1	(Slovakia) Martina Suchá	6	6
WC	(Portugal) Magali de Lattre	1	0
WC	(Romania) Adriana Mingireanu	0	0
(Spain) Arantxa Parra Santonja	6	6
(United Kingdom) Anne Keothavong	7	7
(Ukraine) Yuliana Fedak	5	5
(Argentina) Gisela Dulko	6	6
7	(Spain) Gala León García	4	2

Second round
1	(Slovakia) Martina Suchá	3	2
(Spain) Arantxa Parra Santonja	6	6
(United Kingdom) Anne Keothavong	3	1
(Argentina) Gisela Dulko	6	6

Qualifying competition
(Spain) Arantxa Parra Santonja	6	6
(Argentina) Gisela Dulko	3	4

==== Second qualifier ====
First round
2	(Israel) Tzipora Obziler	3	5
(Netherlands) Kristie Boogert	6	7
WC	(Portugal) Neuza Silva	3	0
(Ukraine) Elena Tatarkova	6	6
(Hungary) Zsófia Gubacsi	6	7^{14}
(Poland) Joanna Sakowicz	4	6^{12}
(Argentina) María Emilia Salerni	2	7^{7}	6
8	(Hungary) Melinda Czink	6	6^{5}	3

Second round
(Netherlands) Kristie Boogert	2	1
(Ukraine) Elena Tatarkova	6	6
(Hungary) Zsófia Gubacsi	3	3
(Argentina) María Emilia Salerni	6	6

Qualifying competition
(Ukraine) Elena Tatarkova	4	2
(Argentina) María Emilia Salerni	6	6

==== Third qualifier ====
First round
3	(Luxembourg) Claudine Schaul	6	2	1
(Federal Republic of Yugoslavia) Katarina Dašković	0	6	6
(Germany) Stephanie Gehrlein	1	1
(Germany) Julia Schruff	6	6
(Bulgaria) Lubomira Bacheva	6	6
(South Africa) Natalie Grandin	2	0
WC	(Portugal) Ana Catarina Nogueira	2	2
5	(Czech Republic) Sandra Kleinová	6	6

Second round
(Federal Republic of Yugoslavia) Katarina Dašković	2	4
(Germany) Julia Schruff	6	6
(Bulgaria) Lubomira Bacheva	6^{3}	6	6^{4}
5	(Czech Republic) Sandra Kleinová	7^{7}	3	7^{7}

Qualifying competition
(Germany) Julia Schruff	7^{7}	0	7
5	(Czech Republic) Sandra Kleinová	6^{4}	6	5

==== Fourth qualifier ====
First round
4	(Czech Republic) Alena Vašková	7	3	6
(Romania) Andreea Vanc	5	6	4
(Republic of Ireland) Kelly Liggan	3	1
(Germany) Adriana Barna	6	6
(Spain) Nuria Llagostera Vives	6	2	3
(Estonia) Maret Ani	1	6	6
(Italy) Valentina Sassi	6^{2}	5
6	(Federal Republic of Yugoslavia) Jelena Janković	7^{7}	7

Second round
4	(Czech Republic) Alena Vašková	2	2
(Germany) Adriana Barna	6	6
(Estonia) Maret Ani	6	6
6	(Federal Republic of Yugoslavia) Jelena Janković	2	4

Qualifying competition
(Germany) Adriana Barna	3	6	2
(Estonia) Maret Ani	6	3	6
