= 2010 Weil Tennis Academy Challenger – Doubles =

Doubles
- 2010 Weil Tennis Academy Challenger

Final
- Champions: (Russia) Artem Sitak (Portugal) Leonardo Tavares
- Runners-up: (India) Harsh Mankad (South Africa) Izak van der Merwe
- Score: 4–6, 6–4, [10–8]

Events
Singles	Doubles
← 2009 ·	Weil Tennis Academy Challenger	· 2011 →

Artem Sitak and Leonardo Tavares won in the final, 4–6, 6–4, [10–8] against Harsh Mankad and Izak van der Merwe.

== Seeds ==
1. (India) Harsh Mankad / (South Africa) Izak van der Merwe (final)
2. (United States) Lester Cook / (United States) David Martin (semifinals)
3. (Australia) Samuel Groth / (Australia) Adam Hubble (quarterfinals, withdrew)
4. (Canada) Pierre-Ludovic Duclos / (United States) John Paul Fruttero (first round)

== Draw ==
=== Key ===
- Q = Qualifier
- WC = Wild card
- LL = Lucky loser
- Alt = Alternate
- SE = Special exempt
- PR = Protected ranking
- ITF = ITF entry
- JE = Junior exempt
- w/o = Walkover
- r = Retired
- d = Defaulted
- SR = Special ranking

=== Draw ===
First round
1	(India) H Mankad (South Africa) I van der Merwe	6	2	[10]
WC	(Philippines) C Mamiit (United States) Nick Papac	4	6	[3]
(United States) A Kuznetsov (United States) B Reynolds	6	7
WC	(United States) Cory Parr (United States) Todd Paul	3	6^{4}
3	(Australia) S Groth (Australia) A Hubble	7	7
WC	(United States) Colt Gaston (United States) D Young	5	5
(New Zealand) M Daniell (New Zealand) J Statham	7	6
(Japan) Y Ito (Japan) T Suzuki	6^{6}	1
Q	(United States) Conor Pollock (United States) M Venus	6	2	[8]
(Russia) A Sitak (Portugal) L Tavares	3	6	[10]
(Sweden) M Ryderstedt (Sweden) A Siljeström	6	6
4	(Canada) P-L Duclos (United States) JP Fruttero	3	3
(United States) Brett Joelson (United States) T Smyczek	6	3	[7]
(United States) B Battistone (United States) N Monroe	4	6	[10]
(Chile) P Capdeville (Argentina) B Dabul	3	2
2	(United States) L Cook (United States) D Martin	6	6

Quarterfinals
1	(India) H Mankad (South Africa) I van der Merwe	6	6
(United States) A Kuznetsov (United States) B Reynolds	4	4
3	(Australia) S Groth (Australia) A Hubble	w/o
(New Zealand) M Daniell (New Zealand) J Statham
(Russia) A Sitak (Portugal) L Tavares	1	6	[10]
(Sweden) M Ryderstedt (Sweden) A Siljeström	6	2	[3]
(United States) B Battistone (United States) N Monroe	3	2
2	(United States) L Cook (United States) D Martin	6	6

Semifinals
1	(India) H Mankad (South Africa) I van der Merwe	6	7
(New Zealand) M Daniell (New Zealand) J Statham	2	5
(Russia) A Sitak (Portugal) L Tavares	6	2	[10]
2	(United States) L Cook (United States) D Martin	3	6	[7]

Finals
1	(India) H Mankad (South Africa) I van der Merwe	6	4	[8]
(Russia) A Sitak (Portugal) L Tavares	4	6	[10]
