= 2004 Estoril Open – Women's doubles =

Women's doubles
- 2004 Estoril Open

Final
- Champions: (Switzerland) Emmanuelle Gagliardi; (Slovakia) Janette Husárová
- Runners-up: (Czech Republic) Olga Blahotová; (Czech Republic) Gabriela Navrátilová
- Score: 6–3, 6–2

Events
Singles	men	women
Doubles	men	women
← 2003 ·	Estoril Open	· 2005 →

Petra Mandula and Patricia Wartusch were the defending champions, but Mandula did not compete this year. Wartusch teamed up with Barbara Schett and lost in quarterfinals to Kira Nagy and Adriana Serra Zanetti.

Emmanuelle Gagliardi and Janette Husárová won the title by defeating Olga Blahotová and Gabriela Navrátilová 6–3, 6–2 in the final. It was the 1st title for Gagliardi and the 17th title for Husárová in their respective doubles careers.

== Seeds ==
1. (France) Marion Bartoli / (France) Émilie Loit (first round, withdrew)
2. (Switzerland) Emmanuelle Gagliardi / (Slovakia) Janette Husárová (champions)
3. (Austria) Barbara Schett / (Austria) Patricia Wartusch (quarterfinals)
4. (Estonia) Maret Ani / (Czech Republic) Libuše Průšová (first round)

== Draw ==
=== Key ===
- Q = Qualifier
- WC = Wild card
- LL = Lucky loser
- Alt = Alternate
- SE = Special exempt
- PR = Protected ranking
- ITF = ITF entry
- JE = Junior exempt
- w/o = Walkover
- r = Retired
- d = Defaulted
- SR = Special ranking

=== Draw ===
First round

Quarterfinals

Semifinals

Final

1
- (France) M Bartoli
- (France) É Loit

- (Czech Republic) D Chládková
- (Slovakia) Ľ Kurhajcová
w/o

- (Czech Republic) D Chládková
- (Slovakia) Ľ Kurhajcová
6^{8}
6
2

- (Italy) ME Camerin
- (Italy) F Pennetta
5
2

- (Czech Republic) O Blahotová
- (Czech Republic) G Navrátilová
7^{10}
4
6

- (Czech Republic) O Blahotová
- (Czech Republic) G Navrátilová
7
6

- (Czech Republic) O Blahotová
- (Czech Republic) G Navrátilová
6
4
6

3
- (Austria) B Schett
- (Austria) P Wartusch
7^{7}
4
6

- (Hungary) K Nagy
- (Italy) Ad Serra Zanetti
4
6
2

- (United States) A Augustus
- (Slovakia) H Nagyová
6^{1}
6
4

3
- (Austria) B Schett
- (Austria) P Wartusch
6^{6}
3

- (Hungary) K Nagy
- (Italy) Ad Serra Zanetti
6
6

- (Hungary) K Nagy
- (Italy) Ad Serra Zanetti
7^{8}
6

WC
- (Portugal) AC Nogueira
- (Portugal) N Silva
0
3

- (Czech Republic) O Blahotová
- (Czech Republic) G Navrátilová
3
2

- (Slovenia) T Križan
- (Slovenia) K Srebotnik
6
6

2
- (Switzerland) E Gagliardi
- (Slovakia) J Husárová
6
6

- (Italy) T Garbin
- (Spain) C Martínez Granados
0
3

- (Slovenia) T Križan
- (Slovenia) K Srebotnik
2
1

- (Czech Republic) I Benešová
- (Czech Republic) M Paštiková
7^{7}
6

- (Czech Republic) I Benešová
- (Czech Republic) M Paštiková
6
6

4
- (Estonia) M Ani
- (Czech Republic) L Průšová
6^{3}
3

- (Czech Republic) I Benešová
- (Czech Republic) M Paštiková
6^{5}
6^{4}

- (Croatia) S Talaja
- (Argentina) P Tarabini
2
3

2
- (Switzerland) E Gagliardi
- (Slovakia) J Husárová
7^{7}
7^{7}

- (Belgium) E Callens
- (Sweden) Å Svensson
6
6

- (Belgium) E Callens
- (Sweden) Å Svensson
1
5

- (Ukraine) Y Beygelzimer
- (Belarus) T Poutchek
6
4
1

2
- (Switzerland) E Gagliardi
- (Slovakia) J Husárová
6
7

2
- (Switzerland) E Gagliardi
- (Slovakia) J Husárová
2
6
6
