= 2005 Estoril Open – Women's singles =

Women's singles
- 2005 Estoril Open

Final
- Champion: (Czech Republic) Lucie Šafářová
- Runner-up: (China) Li Na
- Score: 6–7^{(4–7)}, 6–4, 6–3

Events
Singles	men	women
Doubles	men	women
- Estoril Open

Émilie Loit was the defending champion, but did not compete this year.

Lucie Šafářová won the title by defeating Li Na 6–7^{(4–7)}, 6–4, 6–3 in the final.

== Seeds ==
1. (Italy) Flavia Pennetta (first round)
2. (Russia) Dinara Safina (semifinals)
3. (Argentina) Gisela Dulko (semifinals)
4. (China) Li Na (final)
5. (Spain) ~~Anabel Medina Garrigues~~ (withdrew due to a right knee tendonitis)
6. (Madagascar) Dally Randriantefy (quarterfinals)
7. (Spain) ~~Nuria Llagostera Vives~~ (withdrew due to an upper right leg injury)
8. (Spain) Virginia Ruano Pascual (first round)
9. (China) Zheng Jie (quarterfinals)
10. (Spain) Arantxa Parra Santonja (first round)

== Draw ==
Key

- Q = Qualifier
- WC = Wild card
- LL = Lucky loser
- Alt = Alternate
- ITF = ITF entry
- PR = Protected ranking
- SR = Special ranking
- SE = Special exempt
- JE = Junior exempt
- JR = Junior Accelerator Programme entrant
- CO = College Accelerator Programme entrant
- NG = Next Gen Accelerator Program entrant
- w/o = Walkover
- r = Retired
- d = Defaulted

=== Finals ===
Semifinals
Q	(Czech Republic) Lucie Šafářová	7^{7}	6
3	(Argentina) Gisela Dulko	6^{3}	0
4	(China) Li Na	6	6
2	(Russia) Dinara Safina	1	1

Final
Q	(Czech Republic) Lucie Šafářová	6^{4}	6	6
4	(China) Li Na	7^{7}	4	3

=== Top half ===
First round
1	(Italy) F Pennetta	3	6^{8}
Q	(Ukraine) O Savchuk	6	7^{10}
(Argentina) M Díaz Oliva	6	6
WC	(Canada) M Gloria	1	1
(Netherlands) M Krajicek	3	6	6
(France) S Beltrame	6	4	3
Q	(Czech Republic) L Šafářová	7	6^{3}	6
8	(Spain) V Ruano Pascual	5	7^{7}	0
3	(Argentina) G Dulko	7^{7}	6
(France) S Foretz	6^{2}	2
(Ukraine) A Bondarenko	6	3	6
(Serbia and Montenegro) J Dokic	2	6	2
(Spain) M Marrero	4	4
Q	(Germany) M Müller	6	6
Q	(Slovakia) H Nagyová	6	2	4
9	(China) J Zheng	3	6	6

Second round
Q	(Ukraine) O Savchuk	2	3
(Argentina) M Díaz Oliva	6	6
(Netherlands) M Krajicek	6	6^{6}	5
Q	(Czech Republic) L Šafářová	3	7^{8}	7
3	(Argentina) G Dulko	6	6
(Ukraine) A Bondarenko	2	3
Q	(Germany) M Müller	3	4
9	(China) J Zheng	6	6

Quarterfinals
(Argentina) M Díaz Oliva	2	6	1
Q	(Czech Republic) L Šafářová	6	4	6
3	(Argentina) G Dulko	6	6
9	(China) J Zheng	2	1

Semifinals
Q	(Czech Republic) L Šafářová	7^{7}	6
3	(Argentina) G Dulko	6^{3}	0

=== Bottom half ===
First round
6	(Madagascar) D Randriantefy	6	6
WC	(Portugal) N Silva	2	2
(Spain) M Sánchez Lorenzo	0	7	6
(United States) L Osterloh	6	5	1
(Australia) N Pratt	2	6	6
(Italy) An Serra Zanetti	6	1	1
(France) S Cohen-Aloro	4	6	3
4	(China) N Li	6	1	6
10	(Spain) A Parra Santonja	4	0
(Slovakia) Ľ Cervanová	6	6
LL	(Romania) M Mihalache	3	1
(United States) J Craybas	6	6
LL	(Hungary) M Czink	5	3
LL	(Ukraine) K Bondarenko	7	6
(Luxembourg) C Schaul	2	1
2	(Russia) D Safina	6	6

Second round
6	(Madagascar) D Randriantefy	4	6	6
(Spain) M Sánchez Lorenzo	6	0	2
(Australia) N Pratt	5	1
4	(China) N Li	7	6
(Slovakia) Ľ Cervanová	4	1
(United States) J Craybas	6	6
LL	(Ukraine) K Bondarenko	2	2
2	(Russia) D Safina	6	6

Quarterfinals
6	(Madagascar) D Randriantefy	3	1
4	(China) N Li	6	6
(United States) J Craybas	4	2
2	(Russia) D Safina	6	6

Semifinals
4	(China) N Li	6	6
2	(Russia) D Safina	1	1
