= 2003 Estoril Open – Women's doubles =

Women's doubles
- 2003 Estoril Open

Final
- Champions: (Hungary) Petra Mandula; (Austria) Patricia Wartusch
- Runners-up: (Estonia) Maret Ani; (Switzerland) Emmanuelle Gagliardi
- Score: 6–7^{(3–7)}, 7–6^{(7–3)}, 6–2

Details
- Draw: 16 (1WC/1Q/1LL)
- Seeds: 4

Events
Singles	men	women
Doubles	men	women
← 2002 ·	Estoril Open	· 2004 →

Elena Bovina and Zsófia Gubacsi were the defending champions, but Bovina decided to compete in Charleston at the same week. Gubacsi teamed up with Katarina Dašković and lost in first round to wildcards Vanessa Menga and Ana Catarina Nogueira.

Petra Mandula and Patricia Wartusch won the title by defeating Maret Ani and Emmanuelle Gagliardi 6–7^{(3–7)}, 7–6^{(7–3)}, 6–2 in the final.

== Seeds ==
1. (Hungary) Petra Mandula / (Austria) Patricia Wartusch (champions)
2. (Croatia) Jelena Kostanić / (Germany) Barbara Rittner (first round)
3. (Netherlands) Kristie Boogert / (Spain) Magüi Serna (semifinals)
4. (Belarus) Tatiana Poutchek / (Ukraine) Elena Tatarkova (semifinals)

== Draw ==
=== Key ===
- Q = Qualifier
- WC = Wild card
- LL = Lucky loser
- Alt = Alternate
- SE = Special exempt
- PR = Protected ranking
- ITF = ITF entry
- JE = Junior exempt
- w/o = Walkover
- r = Retired
- d = Defaulted
- SR = Special ranking

=== Draw ===
First round

Quarterfinals

Semifinals

Final

1
- (Hungary) P Mandula
- (Austria) P Wartusch
6
7^{7}

- (Argentina) G Dulko
- (Argentina) ME Salerni
1
6^{3}

1
- (Hungary) P Mandula
- (Austria) P Wartusch
6
6

- (Australia) C Barclay
- (South Africa) K Grant
2
5

- (Spain) C Martínez Granados
- (Italy) An Serra Zanetti
0
3

- (Spain) C Martínez Granados
- (Italy) An Serra Zanetti
6
7

1
- (Hungary) P Mandula
- (Austria) P Wartusch
7^{7}
6

3
- (Netherlands) K Boogert
- (Spain) M Serna
6
6

3
- (Netherlands) K Boogert
- (Spain) M Serna
6^{1}
2

- (South Africa) N Grandin
- (Republic of Ireland) K Liggan
3
2

3
- (Netherlands) K Boogert
- (Spain) M Serna
6
6

WC
- (Brazil) V Menga
- (Portugal) AC Nogueira
5
6
6

WC
- (Brazil) V Menga
- (Portugal) AC Nogueira
2
1

- (Federal Republic of Yugoslavia) K Dašković
- (Hungary) Z Gubacsi
7
2
2

1
- (Hungary) P Mandula
- (Austria) P Wartusch
6^{3}
7^{7}
6

Q
- (Ukraine) Y Fedak
- (Luxembourg) C Schaul
2
6
6

- (Estonia) M Ani
- (Switzerland) E Gagliardi
7^{7}
6^{3}
2

- (Bulgaria) L Bacheva
- (Romania) A Vanc
6
3
4

Q
- (Ukraine) Y Fedak
- (Luxembourg) C Schaul
1
3

- (Germany) A Rösch
- (Croatia) S Talaja
4
3

4
- (Belarus) T Poutchek
- (Ukraine) E Tatarkova
6
6

4
- (Belarus) T Poutchek
- (Ukraine) E Tatarkova
6
6

4
- (Belarus) T Poutchek
- (Ukraine) E Tatarkova
3
6
3

LL
- (Portugal) F Piedade
- (Portugal) N Silva
1
1

- (Estonia) M Ani
- (Switzerland) E Gagliardi
6
2
6

- (Estonia) M Ani
- (Switzerland) E Gagliardi
6
6

- (Estonia) M Ani
- (Switzerland) E Gagliardi
6
6

- (Germany) K Freye
- (Australia) T Musgrave
7
4
7

- (Germany) K Freye
- (Australia) T Musgrave
1
3

2
- (Croatia) J Kostanić
- (Germany) B Rittner
5
6
5

== Qualifying ==
=== Qualifying seeds ===
1. (France) Stéphanie Cohen-Aloro / (France) Virginie Razzano (first round)
2. (Germany) Caroline Schneider / (United States) Elizabeth Schmidt (first round)

=== Qualifiers ===
1. (Ukraine) Yuliana Fedak / (Luxembourg) Claudine Schaul

=== Lucky losers ===
1. (Portugal) Frederica Piedade / (Portugal) Neuza Silva

=== Qualifying draw ===
First round
1	(France) Stéphanie Cohen-Aloro (France) Virginie Razzano	2
(Ukraine) Yuliana Fedak (Luxembourg) Claudine Schaul	8
WC	(Portugal) Frederica Piedade (Portugal) Neuza Silva	8
2	(Germany) Caroline Schneider (United States) Elizabeth Schmidt	3

Qualifying competition
(Ukraine) Yuliana Fedak (Luxembourg) Claudine Schaul	6	6
WC	(Portugal) Frederica Piedade (Portugal) Neuza Silva	1	4
