= Diogo Rocha (tennis) =

Portuguese tennis player (born 1984)

- Country (sports): Portugal
- Residence: Porto, Portugal
- Born: 14 June 1984 (age 42) Porto, Portugal
- Turned pro: 2001
- Retired: 2008
- Plays: Right-handed (two-handed backhand)
- Coach: João Maio
- Prize money: $21,109

Singles
- Career record: 2–2
- Career titles: 0
- Highest ranking: No. 634 (21 February 2005)

Doubles
- Career record: 0–1
- Career titles: 0
- Highest ranking: No. 1372 (14 April 2003)

Diogo Rocha (born 14 June 1984) is a Portuguese former professional tennis player who competed in the ITF Men's Circuit. He achieved his highest singles ATP ranking of world No. 634 in February 2005. Though he never entered a singles event in the ATP Challenger Tour, Rocha did play in the 2003, 2004 and 2005 Estoril Open, and was selected for one Davis Cup tie in 2005.

== Head-to-head vs. Top 20 players ==
This section contains Rocha's win-loss record against players who have been ranked 20th or higher in the world rankings during their careers.

Opponent	Highest rank	Matches	Won	Lost	Win %	Last match	Ref
(Argentina) Juan Ignacio Chela	15	1	0	1	0.00%	Lost (0–6, 0–2 ret.) at the 2004 Estoril Open	
(Argentina) Agustín Calleri	16	1	0	1	0.00%	Lost (1–6, 0–6) at the 2003 Estoril Open	
Total		2	0	2	0.00%	Statistics correct as of 16 May 2016	

== National participation ==
=== Davis Cup (1 win, 0 losses) ===
Rocha played 1 match in 1 tie for the Portugal Davis Cup team in 2005. His singles record was 1–0 and his doubles record was 0–0 (1–0 overall).

Group membership World Group (0–0) WG Play-off (0–0) Group I (0–0) Group II (1–0) Group III (0–0) Group IV (0–0)	Matches by surface Hard (0–0) Clay (0–0) Grass (0–0) Carpet (1–0)	Matches by type Singles (1–0) Doubles (0–0)	Matches by setting Indoors (i) (1–0) Outdoors (0–0)	Matches by venue Portugal (0–0) Away (1–0)

- ▲ ▼ indicates the result of the Davis Cup match followed by the score, date, place of event, the zonal classification and its phase, and the court surface.

Rubber result	Rubber	Match type (partner if any)	Opponent nation	Opponent player(s)	Score
▲4–1; 4–6 March 2005; Kadrioru Tennis Center, Tallinn, Estonia; Group II Europe/Africa First Round; Carpet(i) surface
Victory	V	Singles	Estonia	Oskar Saarne	6–3, 6–2

== See also ==
- Portugal Davis Cup team
