= 2005 Estoril Open – Women's doubles =

Women's doubles
- 2005 Estoril Open

Final
- Champions: (China) Li Ting (China) Sun Tiantian
- Runners-up: (Netherlands) Michaëlla Krajicek (Slovakia) Henrieta Nagyová
- Score: 6–3, 6–1

Events
Singles	men	women
Doubles	men	women
← 2004 ·	Estoril Open	· 2006 →

Emmanuelle Gagliardi and Janette Husárová were the defending champions, but none competed this year.

Li Ting and Sun Tiantian won the title by defeating Michaëlla Krajicek and Henrieta Nagyová 6–3, 6–1 in the final.

== Seeds ==
The top three seeds received a bye into the quarterfinals.

1. (China) Yan Zi / (China) Zheng Jie (quarterfinals)
2. (France) Stéphanie Cohen-Aloro / (Australia) Nicole Pratt (quarterfinals)
3. (China) Li Ting / (China) Sun Tiantian (champions)
4. (Italy) Adriana Serra Zanetti / (Italy) Antonella Serra Zanetti (quarterfinals)

== Draw ==
=== Key ===
- Q = Qualifier
- WC = Wild card
- LL = Lucky loser
- Alt = Alternate
- ITF = ITF entry
- PR = Protected ranking
- SR = Special ranking
- SE = Special exempt
- JE = Junior exempt
- JR = Junior Accelerator Programme entrant
- CO = College Accelerator Programme entrant
- NG = Next Gen Accelerator Program entrant
- w/o = Walkover
- r = Retired
- d = Defaulted

=== Draw ===
First round
(Australia) J Hewitt (China) N Li	5	4
(Ukraine) A Bondarenko (Ukraine) K Bondarenko	7	6
(Argentina) M Díaz Oliva (Argentina) G Dulko	6	7
(France) S Foretz (Luxembourg) C Schaul	4	5
(Czech Republic) L Šafářová (Ukraine) O Savchuk	3	1
(Netherlands) M Krajicek (Slovakia) H Nagyová	6	6
(Portugal) K Rodrigues (United Kingdom) T Wigan	1	0
4	(Italy) Ad Serra Zanetti (Italy) An Serra Zanetti	6	6
(Portugal) C Ferreira (Canada) M Gloria	2	4
(Germany) M Müller (United States) L Osterloh	6	6

Quarterfinals
1	(China) Z Yan (China) J Zheng	4	6^{3}
(Ukraine) A Bondarenko (Ukraine) K Bondarenko	6	7^{7}
3	(China) T Li (China) T Sun	6	6
(Argentina) M Díaz Oliva (Argentina) G Dulko	4	4
(Netherlands) M Krajicek (Slovakia) H Nagyová	7^{7}	6
4	(Italy) Ad Serra Zanetti (Italy) An Serra Zanetti	6^{3}	2
(Germany) M Müller (United States) L Osterloh	6	4	6
2	(France) S Cohen-Aloro (Australia) N Pratt	4	6	2

Semifinals
(Ukraine) A Bondarenko (Ukraine) K Bondarenko	0	6	2
3	(China) T Li (China) T Sun	6	2	6
(Netherlands) M Krajicek (Slovakia) H Nagyová	7	4	6
(Germany) M Müller (United States) L Osterloh	5	6	1

Final
3	(China) T Li (China) T Sun	6	6
(Netherlands) M Krajicek (Slovakia) H Nagyová	3	1
