= Esteban Carril =

Spanish tennis player and coach (born 1977)

- Full name: Esteban Carril Caso
- Country (sports): Spain
- Born: 24 May 1977 (age 49)
- Height: 6 ft 2 in (188 cm)
- Prize money: $34,580

Singles
- Highest ranking: No. 462 (17 Feb 2003)

Doubles
- Career record: 1–1
- Highest ranking: No. 291 (12 Sep 2005)

Esteban Carril Caso (born 24 May 1977) is a Spanish tennis coach and former professional player.

== Playing career ==
A native of Gijón, Carril was a three-time All-American varsity player at Texas Christian University. On the professional tour he made his only ATP Tour main draw appearance in the doubles of the 2005 Estoril Open, reaching the quarter-finals. Most of his tour matches were on the ITF Futures circuit, where he won one singles and nine doubles titles.

== Coaching ==
Carril's coaching career has been highlighted by his three years with Johanna Konta, whom he took from around 100 in the world to an Australian Open semi-final and top 10 ranking, before departing in 2016. He had a trial period as coach of Emma Raducanu in late 2021 and was then announced to have joined fellow Brit Andy Murray's coaching team for the Stockholm Open.

== ITF Futures titles ==
=== Singles: (1) ===
No.	Date	Tournament	Surface	Opponent	Score
1.	May 2002	Kuwait F3, Mishref	Hard	(Romania) Adrian Barbu	6–4, 6–1

=== Doubles: (9) ===
No.	Date	Tournament	Surface	Partner	Opponents	Score
1.	Apr 2002	Kuwait F1, Mishref	Hard	(Germany) Walter Orth	(Russia) Evgueni Smirnov (Netherlands) Jasper Smit	6–2, 5–7, 6–4
2.	Jun 2002	Spain F4, Canary Islands	Hard	(Australia) Mark Kovacs	(Spain) Guillermo García López (Spain) Carles Poch Gradin	7–6^{(3)}, 6–4
3.	Oct 2002	Spain F17, Martos	Hard	(Netherlands) Johan Dijkstra	(Argentina) Diego Junqueira (Italy) Federico Torresi	3–6, 6–4, 6–4
4.	Aug 2003	Croatia F5, Zagreb	Clay	(Croatia) Luka Kutanjac	(Croatia) Goran Belošević (Croatia) Ivan Cinkus	6–3, 7–5
5.	Sep 2003	Spain F22, Madrid	Hard	(Spain) Santiago Ventura	(Italy) Alessandro da Col (Italy) Giuseppe Menga	6–0, 3–6, 6–3
6.	Sep 2003	Spain F24, Madrid	Hard	(Spain) Santiago Ventura	(Brazil) Eduardo Bohrer (Brazil) Márcio Carlsson	6–4, 7–6^{(5)}
7.	Oct 2004	Spain F27, Córdoba	Hard	(Spain) Angel-Jose Martin-Arroyo	(Spain) Sergio Contreras-Farinas (Germany) Tony Holzinger	6–4, 7–5
8.	Aug 2005	Spain F21, Santander	Clay	(Spain) Gabriel Trujillo Soler	(Spain) Guillem Burniol (Spain) José Antonio Sánchez de Luna	6–3, 7–5
9.	Sep 2005	Spain F22, Oviedo	Clay	(Spain) Gabriel Trujillo Soler	(Spain) Cesar Ferrer-Victoria (Spain) Daniel Muñoz de la Nava	6–2, 6–2
