= 2010 Wimbledon Championships – Men's singles qualifying =

Men's singles qualifying
- 2010 Wimbledon Championships

Events
Singles	men	women		boys	girls
Doubles	men	women	mixed	boys	girls
WC Singles	men	women	quad
WC Doubles	men	women	quad
Legends	men	women	seniors

Qualification
Singles	men	women
Doubles	men	women
- Wimbledon Championships

Players and pairs who neither have high enough rankings nor receive wild cards may participate in a qualifying tournament held one week before the annual Wimbledon Tennis Championships.

== Seeds ==
1. (United States) Taylor Dent (qualified)
2. (Germany) Björn Phau (second round)
3. (India) Somdev Devvarman (second round)
4. (Brazil) Thiago Alves (second round)
5. (Spain) Iván Navarro (first round)
6. (Slovenia) Grega Žemlja (second round)
7. (United States) Donald Young (first round)
8. (France) Édouard Roger-Vasselin (second round)
9. (United States) Jesse Levine (qualifying competition, lucky loser)
10. (Brazil) João Souza (first round)
11. (Turkey) Marsel İlhan (qualified)
12. (United States) Ryan Sweeting (qualifying competition, lucky loser)
13. (Austria) Stefan Koubek (qualifying competition, lucky loser)
14. (Portugal) Rui Machado (first round)
15. (Japan) Go Soeda (qualifying competition, lucky loser)
16. (Spain) Santiago Ventura Bertomeu (qualifying competition, lucky loser)
17. (Germany) Tobias Kamke (qualified)
18. (Germany) Julian Reister (qualifying competition, lucky loser)
19. (Australia) Carsten Ball (qualified)
20. (France) David Guez (second round)
21. (Spain) Albert Ramos Viñolas (first round)
22. (Czech Republic) Jan Hernych (second round)
23. (United States) Kevin Kim (second round)
24. (Paraguay) Ramón Delgado (qualifying competition, lucky loser)
25. (Germany) Mischa Zverev (first round)
26. (France) Josselin Ouanna (second round)
27. (France) Nicolas Mahut (qualified)
28. (Germany) Dieter Kindlmann (first round)
29. (Serbia) Ilija Bozoljac (qualified)
30. (Lithuania) Ričardas Berankis (qualified)
31. (Belgium) Christophe Rochus (first round)
32. (Mexico) Santiago González (first round)

== Qualifiers ==
1. (United States) Taylor Dent
2. (Austria) Martin Fischer
3. (Serbia) Ilija Bozoljac
4. (Australia) Carsten Ball
5. (South Africa) Rik de Voest
6. (Croatia) Ivan Dodig
7. (Spain) Guillermo Alcaide
8. (Australia) Bernard Tomic
9. (Germany) Tobias Kamke
10. (Netherlands) Jesse Huta Galung
11. (Turkey) Marsel İlhan
12. (United States) Robert Kendrick
13. (France) Nicolas Mahut
14. (United States) Brendan Evans
15. (United States) Jesse Witten
16. (Lithuania) Ričardas Berankis

== Lucky losers ==
1. (United States) Jesse Levine
2. (United States) Ryan Sweeting
3. (Austria) Stefan Koubek
4. (Japan) Go Soeda
5. (Spain) Santiago Ventura Bertomeu
6. (Germany) Julian Reister
7. (Paraguay) Ramón Delgado

== Qualifying draw ==
=== First qualifier ===
First round
1	(United States) Taylor Dent	7^{7}	6
(Slovakia) Pavol Červenák	6^{2}	2
(Spain) Roberto Bautista Agut	6	6
(Croatia) Antonio Veić	2	1
(Australia) Matthew Ebden	6	6
(Spain) David Marrero	4	4
(Spain) Pedro Clar-Rosselló	2	6	6
20	(France) David Guez	6	4	8

Second round
1	(United States) Taylor Dent	6	6
(Spain) Roberto Bautista Agut	2	3
(Australia) Matthew Ebden	4	6	6
20	(France) David Guez	6	4	3

Qualifying competition
1	(United States) Taylor Dent	4	7^{7}	7^{10}	6
(Australia) Matthew Ebden	6	6^{1}	6^{8}	3

=== Second qualifier ===
First round
2	(Germany) Björn Phau	6	7
(Czech Republic) Lukáš Rosol	4	5
(Slovakia) Dominik Hrbatý	6^{2}	4
(Austria) Martin Fischer	7^{7}	6
WC	(United Kingdom) Daniel Cox	4	6^{5}
(France) Sébastien de Chaunac	6	7^{7}
(Australia) John Millman	2	3
24	(Paraguay) Ramón Delgado	6	6

Second round
2	(Germany) Björn Phau	3	3
(Austria) Martin Fischer	6	6
(France) Sébastien de Chaunac	4	7^{8}	3
24	(Paraguay) Ramón Delgado	6	6^{6}	6

Qualifying competition
(Austria) Martin Fischer	6	7	7^{7}
24	(Paraguay) Ramón Delgado	4	5	6^{2}

=== Third qualifier ===
First round
3	(India) Somdev Devvarman	6	6
(France) Guillaume Rufin	2	2
(United States) Ryler DeHeart	6	0
WC	(United Kingdom) Daniel Smethurst	0	0^{r}
(Spain) Daniel Muñoz de la Nava	4	6	6
(Japan) Yūichi Sugita	6	1	4
(Italy) Simone Vagnozzi	5	4
29	(Serbia) Ilija Bozoljac	7	6

Second round
3	(India) Somdev Devvarman	2	7^{7}	3
(United States) Ryler DeHeart	6	6^{2}	6
(Spain) Daniel Muñoz de la Nava	4	6	3
29	(Serbia) Ilija Bozoljac	6	3	6

Qualifying competition
(United States) Ryler DeHeart	6^{1}	4	6^{4}
29	(Serbia) Ilija Bozoljac	7^{7}	6	7^{7}

=== Fourth qualifier ===
First round
4	(Brazil) Thiago Alves	6	6
(Brazil) Júlio Silva	4	4
(Luxembourg) Gilles Müller	6	6
(Portugal) Leonardo Tavares	3	4
(Russia) Alexander Kudryavtsev	6	6
WC	(United Kingdom) Morgan Phillips	3	2
(Czech Republic) Dušan Lojda	6^{5}	2
19	(Australia) Carsten Ball	7^{7}	6

Second round
4	(Brazil) Thiago Alves	5	2
(Luxembourg) Gilles Müller	7	6
(Russia) Alexander Kudryavtsev	6^{3}	4
19	(Australia) Carsten Ball	7^{7}	6

Qualifying competition
(Luxembourg) Gilles Müller	4	4	6^{7}
19	(Australia) Carsten Ball	6	6	7^{9}

=== Fifth qualifier ===
First round
5	(Spain) Iván Navarro	3	7^{7}	8
(Germany) Dominik Meffert	6	6^{3}	10
(South Africa) Rik de Voest	1	6	6
(United States) Alex Bogomolov Jr.	6	2	4
(Czech Republic) Ivo Minář	4	7	6
(Switzerland) Michael Lammer	6	5	1
(Germany) Andre Begemann	6	7^{7}
25	(Germany) Mischa Zverev	3	6^{2}

Second round
(Germany) Dominik Meffert	4	1^{r}
(South Africa) Rik de Voest	6	1
(Czech Republic) Ivo Minář	7^{9}	4	4
(Germany) Andre Begemann	6^{7}	6	6

Qualifying competition
(South Africa) Rik de Voest	6	7^{7}	6
(Germany) Andre Begemann	3	6^{4}	1

=== Sixth qualifier ===
First round
6	(Slovenia) Grega Žemlja	4	6	6
(Brazil) Caio Zampieri	6	4	1
(Croatia) Ivan Dodig	6	6
(Spain) Guillermo Olaso	2	3
(Austria) Alexander Peya	4	7^{7}	6
(Australia) Chris Guccione	6	6^{1}	4
(Austria) Philipp Oswald	3	6	14
23	(United States) Kevin Kim	6	4	16

Second round
6	(Slovenia) Grega Žemlja	3	6	1
(Croatia) Ivan Dodig	6	3	6
(Austria) Alexander Peya	7^{8}	6
23	(United States) Kevin Kim	6^{6}	3

Qualifying competition
(Croatia) Ivan Dodig	4	2	6	7^{7}	6
(Austria) Alexander Peya	6	6	2	6^{4}	4

=== Seventh qualifier ===
First round
7	(United States) Donald Young	4	1
(Spain) Guillermo Alcaide	6	6
WC	(United Kingdom) David Rice	2	2
(Argentina) Juan Pablo Brzezicki	6	6
(Russia) Evgeny Kirillov	6	6
(Argentina) Martín Alund	2	2
WC	(United Kingdom) Josh Goodall	6	6
21	(Spain) Albert Ramos Viñolas	3	4

Second round
(Spain) Guillermo Alcaide	6	5	6
(Argentina) Juan Pablo Brzezicki	4	7	2
(Russia) Evgeny Kirillov	4	6	10
WC	(United Kingdom) Josh Goodall	6	4	8

Qualifying competition
(Spain) Guillermo Alcaide	6	6	6
(Russia) Evgeny Kirillov	4	3	4

=== Eighth qualifier ===
First round
8	(France) Édouard Roger-Vasselin	6	6
WC	(United Kingdom) Joshua Milton	1	4
(United States) Michael Yani	6^{4}	7	5
(Australia) Bernard Tomic	7^{7}	5	7
(Canada) Peter Polansky	7^{7}	2	3
(Australia) Marinko Matosevic	6^{4}	6	6
(India) Prakash Amritraj	6	6
28	(Germany) Dieter Kindlmann	3	4

Second round
8	(France) Édouard Roger-Vasselin	1	6^{4}
(Australia) Bernard Tomic	6	7^{7}
(Australia) Marinko Matosevic	6	3	3
(India) Prakash Amritraj	2	6	6

Qualifying competition
(Australia) Bernard Tomic	7^{7}	6	6
(India) Prakash Amritraj	6^{3}	3	4

=== Ninth qualifier ===
First round
9	(United States) Jesse Levine	6	6
(United States) Lester Cook	4	3
(Australia) Joseph Sirianni	6	6
(Morocco) Reda El Amrani	4	2
(United States) Alex Kuznetsov	6	6^{5}	14
(South Africa) Izak van der Merwe	3	7^{7}	12
(Argentina) Sebastián Decoud	6^{10}	1
17	(Germany) Tobias Kamke	7^{12}	6

Second round
9	(United States) Jesse Levine	6	6
(Australia) Joseph Sirianni	1	3
(United States) Alex Kuznetsov	4	5
17	(Germany) Tobias Kamke	6	7

Qualifying competition
9	(United States) Jesse Levine	6	2	2	3
17	(Germany) Tobias Kamke	4	6	6	6

=== Tenth qualifier ===
First round
10	(Brazil) João Souza	4	6^{3}
PR	(France) Adrian Mannarino	6	7^{7}
(Israel) Noam Okun	6^{1}	2
(Italy) Riccardo Ghedin	7^{7}	6
(Germany) Bastian Knittel	6	6
(Italy) Francesco Aldi	2	2
(Netherlands) Jesse Huta Galung	4	7	8
31	(Belgium) Christophe Rochus	6	5	6

Second round
PR	(France) Adrian Mannarino	6	6
(Italy) Riccardo Ghedin	1	4
(Germany) Bastian Knittel	5	6	3
(Netherlands) Jesse Huta Galung	7	4	6

Qualifying competition
PR	(France) Adrian Mannarino	3	3	3
(Netherlands) Jesse Huta Galung	6	6	6

=== Eleventh qualifier ===
First round
11	(Turkey) Marsel İlhan	6	4	6
(Belgium) Ruben Bemelmans	3	6	1
(Slovenia) Aljaž Bedene	6	3	6
(France) Thierry Ascione	2	6	4
WC	(United Kingdom) Chris Eaton	6	3	8
(Croatia) Roko Karanušić	4	6	10
(Argentina) Juan-Martín Aranguren	1	1
22	(Czech Republic) Jan Hernych	6	6

Second round
11	(Turkey) Marsel İlhan	6	6
(Slovenia) Aljaž Bedene	2	4
(Croatia) Roko Karanušić	3	7	8
22	(Czech Republic) Jan Hernych	6	5	6

Qualifying competition
11	(Turkey) Marsel İlhan	7	7^{7}	6
(Croatia) Roko Karanušić	5	6^{4}	2

=== Twelfth qualifier ===
First round
12	(United States) Ryan Sweeting	7^{7}	7^{7}
(Czech Republic) Jan Minář	6^{5}	6^{2}
(Monaco) Benjamin Balleret	6	6
(Spain) Arnau Brugués Davi	4	2
(United States) Robert Kendrick	6	6
(Serbia) Filip Krajinović	4	2
WC	(United Kingdom) Alexander Ward	6^{3}	3
26	(France) Josselin Ouanna	7^{7}	6

Second round
12	(United States) Ryan Sweeting	6	6
(Monaco) Benjamin Balleret	3	2
(United States) Robert Kendrick	6	6
26	(France) Josselin Ouanna	3	4

Qualifying competition
12	(United States) Ryan Sweeting	4	7^{7}	6	6^{4}	6
(United States) Robert Kendrick	6	6^{4}	3	7^{7}	8

=== Thirteenth qualifier ===
First round
13	(Austria) Stefan Koubek	6	5	6
(France) Jonathan Dasnières	1	7	2
(Republic of Ireland) Conor Niland	6^{5}	4
(Austria) Andreas Haider-Maurer	7^{7}	6
(United Kingdom) Alex Bogdanovic	6	7^{7}
(Brazil) Ricardo Hocevar	3	6^{3}
(Canada) Frank Dancevic	3	0
27	(France) Nicolas Mahut	6	6

Second round
13	(Austria) Stefan Koubek	7^{7}	6
(Austria) Andreas Haider-Maurer	6^{3}	3
(United Kingdom) Alex Bogdanovic	6	3	22
27	(France) Nicolas Mahut	3	6	24

Qualifying competition
13	(Austria) Stefan Koubek	7^{10}	6	3	4	4
27	(France) Nicolas Mahut	6^{8}	3	6	6	6

=== Fourteenth qualifier ===
First round
14	(Portugal) Rui Machado	6	3	3
(Japan) Tatsuma Ito	4	6	6
(United States) Brendan Evans	6	6^{2}	6
(France) Benoît Paire	4	7^{7}	3
(New Zealand) Daniel King-Turner	6	6^{7}	13
(Slovakia) Andrej Martin	2	7^{9}	15
(Belgium) Yannick Mertens	3	4
18	(Germany) Julian Reister	6	6

Second round
(Japan) Tatsuma Ito	7^{7}	3	3
(United States) Brendan Evans	6^{5}	6	6
(Slovakia) Andrej Martin	2	4
18	(Germany) Julian Reister	6	6

Qualifying competition
(United States) Brendan Evans	7^{15}	6	7^{7}
18	(Germany) Julian Reister	6^{13}	3	6^{2}

=== Fifteenth qualifier ===
First round
15	(Japan) Go Soeda	6	7
(Spain) Íñigo Cervantes	3	5
(France) Alexandre Sidorenko	7^{7}	7^{7}
(Belgium) Niels Desein	6^{0}	6^{3}
PR	(United States) Bobby Reynolds	7	3	1
(United States) Jesse Witten	5	6	6
(Australia) Greg Jones	6	7^{7}
32	(Mexico) Santiago González	0	6^{5}

Second round
15	(Japan) Go Soeda	6	6
(France) Alexandre Sidorenko	2	3
(United States) Jesse Witten	6	7^{8}
(Australia) Greg Jones	2	6^{6}

Qualifying competition
15	(Japan) Go Soeda	2	2	6	4
(United States) Jesse Witten	6	6	2	6

=== Sixteenth qualifier ===
First round
16	(Spain) Santiago Ventura Bertomeu	2	6	6
(France) Éric Prodon	6	4	4
(Spain) Sergio Gutiérrez Ferrol	6^{6}	2
(Italy) Flavio Cipolla	7^{8}	6
WC	(United Kingdom) Dan Evans	4	6	12
(United States) Tim Smyczek	6	1	10
(United States) Ryan Harrison	3	2
30	(Lithuania) Ričardas Berankis	6	6

Second round
16	(Spain) Santiago Ventura Bertomeu	6	6
(Italy) Flavio Cipolla	4	3
WC	(United Kingdom) Dan Evans	5	3
30	(Lithuania) Ričardas Berankis	7	6

Qualifying competition
16	(Spain) Santiago Ventura Bertomeu	5	1	3
30	(Lithuania) Ričardas Berankis	7	6	6
