= 2003 Estoril Open – Men's doubles =

Men's doubles
- 2003 Estoril Open

Final
- Champions: (India) Mahesh Bhupathi; (Belarus) Max Mirnyi
- Runners-up: (Argentina) Lucas Arnold; (Argentina) Mariano Hood
- Score: 6–1, 6–2

Events
Singles	men	women
Doubles	men	women
← 2002 ·	Estoril Open	· 2004 →

Karsten Braasch and Andrei Olhovskiy were the defending champions but did not compete that year.

Mahesh Bhupathi and Max Mirnyi won in the final 6–1, 6–2 against Lucas Arnold and Mariano Hood.

== Seeds ==
1. (India) Mahesh Bhupathi / (Belarus) Max Mirnyi (champions)
2. (Czech Republic) Martin Damm / (Czech Republic) Cyril Suk (quarterfinals)
3. (Czech Republic) Tomáš Cibulec / (Czech Republic) Pavel Vízner (first round)
4. (Australia) Wayne Arthurs / (United States) Donald Johnson (first round)

== Draw ==
=== Key ===
- Q = Qualifier
- WC = Wild card
- LL = Lucky loser
- Alt = Alternate
- SE = Special exempt
- PR = Protected ranking
- ITF = ITF entry
- JE = Junior exempt
- w/o = Walkover
- r = Retired
- d = Defaulted
- SR = Special ranking

First round

Quarterfinals

Semifinals

Final

1
- (India) M Bhupathi
- (Belarus) M Mirnyi
4
6
7^{7}

- (Spain) Á López Morón
- (Spain) D Sánchez
6
3
6^{4}

1
- (India) M Bhupathi
- (Belarus) M Mirnyi
6
6

- (Finland) J Nieminen
- (Russia) A Stoliarov
6
6

- (Finland) J Nieminen
- (Russia) A Stoliarov
2
2

- (South Africa) D Adams
- (Netherlands) S Schalken
4
4

1
- (India) M Bhupathi
- (Belarus) M Mirnyi
6
6

3
- (Czech Republic) T Cibulec
- (Czech Republic) P Vízner
6
3
2

- (Czech Republic) J Novák
- (Czech Republic) P Pála
3
2

- (Czech Republic) J Novák
- (Czech Republic) P Pála
4
6
6

- (Czech Republic) J Novák
- (Czech Republic) P Pála
6
6

- (United States) G Oliver
- (Germany) D Prinosil
4
1

- (Chile) F González
- (Spain) T Robredo
2
2

- (Chile) F González
- (Spain) T Robredo
6
6

1
- (India) M Bhupathi
- (Belarus) M Mirnyi
6
6

WC
- (Portugal) E Couto
- (Portugal) B Mota
6
6

- (Argentina) L Arnold
- (Argentina) M Hood
1
2

- (Spain) D Ferrer
- (Spain) F López
3
3

WC
- (Portugal) E Couto
- (Portugal) B Mota
4
4

- (Argentina) G Etlis
- (Argentina) M Rodríguez
6
6

- (Argentina) G Etlis
- (Argentina) M Rodríguez
6
6

4
- (Australia) W Arthurs
- (United States) D Johnson
4
4

- (Argentina) G Etlis
- (Argentina) M Rodríguez
6^{1}
7^{7}
4

- (Argentina) J Acasuso
- (Argentina) A Calleri
1
1

- (Argentina) L Arnold
- (Argentina) M Hood
7^{7}
6^{5}
6

- (Argentina) L Arnold
- (Argentina) M Hood
6
6

- (Argentina) L Arnold
- (Argentina) M Hood
7^{7}
6

WC
- (Iran) M Bahrami
- (Portugal) N Marques
3
4

2
- (Czech Republic) M Damm
- (Czech Republic) C Suk
6^{3}
3

2
- (Czech Republic) M Damm
- (Czech Republic) C Suk
6
6
