= 2010 Weil Tennis Academy Challenger =

2010 tennis tournament

- Date: May 31 – June 6
- Edition: 1st
- Location: Ojai, California, United States

Champions

Singles
- (United States) Bobby Reynolds

Doubles
- (Russia) Artem Sitak / (Portugal) Leonardo Tavares
- Weil Tennis Academy Challenger

The 2010 Weil Tennis Academy Challenger was a professional tennis tournament played on outdoor hard courts. It was part of the 2010 ATP Challenger Tour. It took place in Ojai, California, United States between May 31 and June 6, 2010.

== Singles main-draw entrants ==
=== Seeds ===
Nationality	Player	Ranking*	Seeding
USA	Ryan Sweeting	116	1
ARG	Brian Dabul	122	2
USA	Kevin Kim	140	3
USA	Donald Young	147	4
USA	Michael Yani	151	5
USA	Robert Kendrick	156	6
IRL	Conor Niland	170	7
USA	Alex Kuznetsov	178	8

- Rankings are as of May 24, 2010.

=== Other entrants ===
The following players received wildcards into the singles main draw:

- (United States) Sekou Bangoura
- (United States) Steve Johnson
- (United States) Bobby Reynolds
- (United States) Donald Young

The following players received enty into the singles main draw as an alternate:

- (Canada) Pierre-Ludovic Duclos

The following players received entry from the qualifying draw:

- (Canada) Philip Bester
- (Philippines) Cecil Mamiit
- (United States) Nicholas Monroe
- (United States) Greg Ouellette

The following players received Lucky loser into the singles main draw:

- (Australia) Dayne Kelly

== Champions ==
=== Singles ===
(United States) Bobby Reynolds def. (Australia) Marinko Matosevic, 3–6, 7–5, 7–5

=== Doubles ===
(Russia) Artem Sitak / (Portugal) Leonardo Tavares def. (India) Harsh Mankad / (South Africa) Izak van der Merwe, 4–6, 6–4, [10–8]
