= 2005 Estoril Open – Men's singles =

Men's singles
- 2005 Estoril Open

Final
- Champion: (Argentina) Gastón Gaudio
- Runner-up: (Spain) Tommy Robredo
- Score: 6–1, 2–6, 6–1

Details
- Draw: 32
- Seeds: 8

Events
Singles	men	women
Doubles	men	women
← 2004 ·	Portugal Open	· 2006 →

In the men's singles final, Gastón Gaudio defeated Tommy Robredo with a score of 6–1, 2–6, 6–1.

== Seeds ==
1. (Spain) Carlos Moyà (semifinals, retired because of an arm injury)
2. (Argentina) Gastón Gaudio (champion)
3. (Sweden) Joachim Johansson (second round)
4. (Spain) Tommy Robredo (finalist)
5. (Chile) Nicolás Massú (first round)
6. (Czech Republic) ~~Radek Štěpánek~~ (withdrew due to harmstring injury)
7. (Czech Republic) Jiří Novák (first round)
8. (Spain) Feliciano López (quarterfinals)

== Draw ==
=== Key ===
- Q = Qualifier
- WC = Wild card
- LL = Lucky loser
- Alt = Alternate
- ITF = ITF entry
- PR = Protected ranking
- SR = Special ranking
- SE = Special exempt
- JE = Junior exempt
- JR = Junior Accelerator Programme entrant
- CO = College Accelerator Programme entrant
- NG = Next Gen Accelerator Program entrant
- w/o = Walkover
- r = Retired
- d = Defaulted

=== Finals ===
Semifinals
1	(Spain) Carlos Moyà	3	0^{r}
4/WC	(Spain) Tommy Robredo	6	3
(Spain) Guillermo García López	4	6	2
2	(Argentina) Gastón Gaudio	6	2	6

Final
4/WC	(Spain) Tommy Robredo	1	6	1
2	(Argentina) Gastón Gaudio	6	2	6

=== Top half ===
First round
1	(Spain) C Moyà	6	7^{7}
(Spain) F Mantilla	0	6^{5}
(Spain) JC Ferrero	6	2	7^{8}
(Cyprus) M Baghdatis	3	6	6^{6}
Q	(Czech Republic) T Cakl	6	6
(Denmark) K Carlsen	3	0
(France) PH Mathieu	7^{7}	6
7	(Czech Republic) J Novák	6^{5}	1
4/WC	(Spain) T Robredo	6	2	6
Q	(Czech Republic) F Čermák	2	6	4
(Luxembourg) G Müller	6	1	2
(Spain) S Ventura	3	6	6
(Italy) D Sanguinetti	6	6
Q	(Spain) F Cóndor	0	2
(Spain) A Costa	3	6	6
5	(Chile) N Massú	6	3	3

Second round
1	(Spain) C Moyà	7	6^{4}	6
(Spain) JC Ferrero	5	7^{7}	4
Q	(Czech Republic) T Cakl	1	1
(France) PH Mathieu	6	6
4/WC	(Spain) T Robredo	7	6
(Spain) S Ventura	5	0
(Italy) D Sanguinetti	5	6	4
(Spain) A Costa	7	3	4

Quarterfinals
1	(Spain) C Moyà	6	6
(France) PH Mathieu	4	2
4/WC	(Spain) T Robredo	6	6
(Italy) D Sanguinetti	2	2

Semifinals
1	(Spain) C Moyà	3	0^{r}
4/WC	(Spain) T Robredo	6	3

=== Bottom half ===
First round
9	(Argentina) J Chela	1	2
LL	(Costa Rica) J Marín	6	6
WC	(Portugal) R Machado	6	3	1
(Argentina) A Calleri	4	6	6
(Spain) G García López	6	6
(Croatia) I Karlović	3	3
(Spain) Á Calatrava	6^{1}	4
3	(Sweden) J Johansson	7^{7}	6
8	(Spain) F López	6^{1}	7^{7}	6
WC	(Spain) À Corretja	7^{7}	6^{4}	4
Q	(Spain) G Blanco	6^{5}	4
(Spain) A Montañés	7^{7}	6
(Czech Republic) M Tabara	1	6	6
(Czech Republic) T Berdych	6	4	1
(Czech Republic) J Hernych	7^{7}	5	0
2	(Argentina) G Gaudio	6^{5}	7	6

Second round
LL	(Costa Rica) J Marín	6	3
Q	(Argentina) A Calleri	4	1^{r}
(Spain) G García López	6	6
3	(Sweden) J Johansson	2	4
8	(Spain) F López	7^{7}	4	6
(Spain) A Montañés	6^{5}	6	4
(Czech Republic) M Tabara	2	1
2	(Argentina) G Gaudio	6	6

Quarterfinals
LL	(Costa Rica) J Marín	1	6	3
(Spain) G García López	6	2	6
8	(Spain) F López	2	2
2	(Argentina) G Gaudio	6	6

Semifinals
(Spain) G García López	4	6	2
2	(Argentina) G Gaudio	6	2	6
