= 2004 Estoril Open – Women's singles =

Women's singles
- 2004 Estoril Open

Final
- Champion: (France) Émilie Loit
- Runner-up: (Czech Republic) Iveta Benešová
- Score: 7–5, 7–6^{(7–1)}

Events
Singles	men	women
Doubles	men	women
- Estoril Open

Magüi Serna was the defending champion, but did not compete this year.

Émilie Loit won the title by defeating Iveta Benešová 7–5, 7–6^{(7–1)} in the final. It was the second title in the year for Loit and the eighth title in her singles career.

== Seeds ==
1. (Russia) Elena Bovina (second round)
2. (Australia) Alicia Molik (first round)
3. (France) Émilie Loit (champion)
4. (Czech Republic) Denisa Chládková (quarterfinals)
5. (Austria) Barbara Schett (quarterfinals)
6. (Czech Republic) Iveta Benešová (final)
7. (Slovenia) Katarina Srebotnik (second round)
8. (France) Marion Bartoli (first round)

== Draw ==
Key

- Q = Qualifier
- WC = Wild card
- LL = Lucky loser
- Alt = Alternate
- ITF = ITF entry
- PR = Protected ranking
- SR = Special ranking
- SE = Special exempt
- JE = Junior exempt
- JR = Junior Accelerator Programme entrant
- CO = College Accelerator Programme entrant
- NG = Next Gen Accelerator Program entrant
- w/o = Walkover
- r = Retired
- d = Defaulted

=== Finals ===
Semifinals
(Spain) Marta Marrero	4	4
3	(France) Émilie Loit	6	6
6	(Czech Republic) Iveta Benešová	6	7
(France) Stéphanie Cohen-Aloro	3	5

Final
3	(France) Émilie Loit	7	7^{7}
6	(Czech Republic) Iveta Benešová	5	6^{1}

=== Top half ===
First round
1	(Russia) E Bovina	6	6
WC	(Croatia) I Majoli	4	2
(Spain) M Marrero	6	6
(Hungary) V Németh	1	1
Q	(Germany) AL Grönefeld	6	6
(Slovakia) Ľ Kurhajcová	1	2
Q	(Estonia) M Ani	1	7^{10}	4
5	(Austria) B Schett	6	6^{8}	6
3	(France) É Loit	6	6
(Belgium) E Callens	2	2
(Slovakia) Ľ Cervanová	3	6	6
(Switzerland) E Gagliardi	6	2	4
(Italy) T Garbin	7	2	3
(Czech Republic) K Koukalová	5	6	6
(Italy) R Grande	7^{7}	3	5
7	(Slovenia) K Srebotnik	6^{4}	6	7

Second round
1	(Russia) E Bovina	7^{8}	4	3
(Spain) M Marrero	6^{6}	6	6
Q	(Germany) AL Grönefeld	5	5
5	(Austria) B Schett	7	7
3	(France) É Loit	6	6
(Slovakia) Ľ Cervanová	2	0
(Czech Republic) K Koukalová	6	6
7	(Slovenia) K Srebotnik	3	4

Quarterfinals
(Spain) M Marrero	6	6
5	(Austria) B Schett	0	2
3	(France) É Loit	6	2	6
(Czech Republic) K Koukalová	3	6	4

Semifinals
(Spain) M Marrero	4	4
3	(France) É Loit	6	6

=== Bottom half ===
First round
6	(Czech Republic) I Benešová	7^{7}	6
Q	(Argentina) N Gussoni	6^{4}	3
(Italy) F Pennetta	6	6
(Sweden) Å Svensson	1	3
WC	(Portugal) N Silva	3	7^{7}	7^{10}
Q	(Germany) J Schruff	6	6^{5}	6^{8}
(Ukraine) Y Beygelzimer	3	2
4	(Czech Republic) D Chládková	6	6
8	(France) M Bartoli	3	3
(Italy) ME Camerin	6	6
(Slovakia) M Suchá	6	6
(Czech Republic) Z Ondrášková	1	2
(Czech Republic) S Kleinová	2	7^{7}	0
(France) S Cohen-Aloro	6	6^{4}	6
(Slovakia) H Nagyová	3	6	7^{7}
2	(Australia) A Molik	6	3	6^{3}

Second round
6	(Czech Republic) I Benešová	1	6	6
(Italy) F Pennetta	6	3	4
WC	(Portugal) N Silva	2	1
4	(Czech Republic) D Chládková	6	6
(Italy) ME Camerin	2	4
(Slovakia) M Suchá	6	6
(France) S Cohen-Aloro	7	7
(Slovakia) H Nagyová	5	5

Quarterfinals
6	(Czech Republic) I Benešová	6	6
4	(Czech Republic) D Chládková	2	2
(Slovakia) M Suchá	6	4	4
(France) S Cohen-Aloro	3	6	6

Semifinals
6	(Czech Republic) I Benešová	6	7
(France) S Cohen-Aloro	3	5
