= 2003 Estoril Open =

- Date: 7–13 April
- Edition: 14th (ATP) / 7th (WTA)
- Surface: Clay / outdoor
- Location: Oeiras, Portugal

Champions

Men's singles
- (Russia) Nikolay Davydenko

Women's singles
- (Spain) Magüi Serna

Men's doubles
- (India) Mahesh Bhupathi / (Belarus) Max Mirnyi

Women's doubles
- (Hungary) Petra Mandula / (Austria) Patricia Wartusch
- Estoril Open

The 2003 Estoril Open was a tennis tournament played on outdoor clay courts at the Estoril Court Central in Oeiras in Portugal that was part of the International Series of the 2003 ATP Tour and of Tier IV of the 2003 WTA Tour. The tournament ran from 7 April until 13 April 2003. Nikolay Davydenko and Magüi Serna won the singles title.

== Finals ==
=== Men's singles ===
(Russia) Nikolay Davydenko defeated (Argentina) Agustín Calleri 6–4, 6–3

- It was Davydenko's 2nd title of the year and the 2nd of his career.

=== Women's singles ===
(Spain) Magüi Serna defeated (Germany) Julia Schruff 6–4, 6–1

- It was Serna's 1st title of the year and the 3rd of her career.

=== Men's doubles ===
(India) Mahesh Bhupathi / (Belarus) Max Mirnyi defeated (Argentina) Lucas Arnold / (Argentina) Mariano Hood 6–1, 6–2

- It was Bhupathi's 1st title of the year and the 27th of his career. It was Mirnyi's 3rd title of the year and the 16th of his career.

=== Women's doubles ===
(Hungary) Petra Mandula / (Austria) Patricia Wartusch defeated (Estonia) Maret Ani / (Switzerland) Emmanuelle Gagliardi 6–7^{(3–7)}, 7–6^{(7–3)}, 6–2

- It was Mandula's 1st title of the year and the 4th of her career. It was Wartusch's 1st title of the year and the 7th of her career.
