= 2005 Estoril Open =

- Date: 25 April – 1 May
- Edition: 16th (ATP) / 9th (WTA)
- Surface: Clay / outdoor
- Location: Oeiras, Portugal

Champions

Men's singles
- (Argentina) Gastón Gaudio

Women's singles
- (Czech Republic) Lucie Šafářová

Men's doubles
- (Czech Republic) František Čermák / (Czech Republic) Leoš Friedl

Women's doubles
- (China) Li Ting / (China) Sun Tiantian
← 2004 ·	Estoril Open	· 2006 →

The 2005 Estoril Open was a tennis tournament played on outdoor clay courts. This event was the 16th edition of the Estoril Open for the men (the 9th for the women), included in the 2005 ATP Tour International Series and in the 2005 WTA Tour Tier IV Series. Both the men's and the women's events took place at the Estoril Court Central, in Oeiras, Portugal, from 25 April through 1 May 2005. Gastón Gaudio and Lucie Šafářová won the singles titles.

== Finals ==
=== Men's singles ===
(Argentina) Gastón Gaudio defeated (Spain) Tommy Robredo, 6–1, 2–6, 6–1

=== Women's singles ===
(Czech Republic) Lucie Šafářová defeated (China) Li Na, 6–7^{(4–7)} 6–4, 6–3

=== Men's doubles ===
(Czech Republic) František Čermák / (Czech Republic) Leoš Friedl defeated (Argentina) Juan Ignacio Chela / (Spain) Tommy Robredo, 6–3, 6–4

=== Women's doubles ===
(China) Li Ting / (China) Sun Tiantian defeated (Netherlands) Michaëlla Krajicek / (Slovakia) Henrieta Nagyová, 6–3, 6–1
