= Brazil Open Series =

Defunct tennis tournament
- Location: Curitiba, Brazil
- Category: ATP Challenger Tour
- Surface: Hard
- Draw: 32S/17Q/16D
- Prize money: $50,000+H

The Brazil Open Series was a professional tennis tournament played on outdoor hardcourts. It was part of the ATP Challenger Tour. It was held in Curitiba, Brazil in 2010.

== History ==
In 2010, The Brazil Open Series was introduced as part of the ATP Challenger Tour. The event was held in Curitiba, Brazil, and played on hardcourts.

The event was intended to provide opportunities for lower-ranked professional players to earn prizes and ranking points in international events.

== Past finals ==
=== Singles ===
Year	Champion	Runner-up	Score
2010	(Germany) Dominik Meffert	(Brazil) Ricardo Mello	6–4, 6–7(3), 6–2

=== Doubles ===
Year	Champions	Runners-up	Score
2010	(Germany) Dominik Meffert (Portugal) Leonardo Tavares	(Paraguay) Ramón Delgado (Brazil) André Sá	3–6, 6–2, [10–2]
