= 2004 Estoril Open =

- Date: 12–18 April
- Edition: 15th(ATP) / 8th(WTA)
- Surface: Clay / outdoor
- Location: Oeiras, Portugal
- Venue: Estoril Court Central

Champions

Men's singles
- (Argentina) Juan Ignacio Chela

Women's singles
- (France) Émilie Loit

Men's doubles
- (Argentina) Juan Ignacio Chela / (Argentina) Gastón Gaudio

Women's doubles
- (Switzerland) Emmanuelle Gagliardi / (Slovakia) Janette Husárová
- Estoril Open

The 2004 Estoril Open was a tennis tournament played on outdoor clay courts at the Estoril Court Central in Oeiras in Portugal that was part of the International Series of the men's 2004 ATP Tour and of Tier IV of the women's 2004 WTA Tour. It was the 15th edition of the tournament for the men (the 8th for the women) and was held from 12 April until 18 April 2004. Juan Ignacio Chela and Émilie Loit won the singles titles.

== Finals ==
=== Men's singles ===
(Argentina) Juan Ignacio Chela defeated (Russia) Marat Safin 6–7^{(2–7)}, 6–3, 6–3

- It was Chela's 2nd title of the year and the 4th of his career.

=== Women's singles ===
(France) Émilie Loit defeated (Czech Republic) Iveta Benešová 7–5, 7–6^{(7–1)}

- It was Loit's 3rd title of the year and the 10th of her career.

=== Men's doubles ===
(Argentina) Juan Ignacio Chela / (Argentina) Gastón Gaudio defeated (Czech Republic) František Čermák / (Czech Republic) Leoš Friedl 6–2, 6–1

- It was Chela's 3rd title of the year and the 5th of his career. It was Gaudio's 2nd title of the year and the 4th of his career.

=== Women's doubles ===
(Switzerland) Emmanuelle Gagliardi / (Slovakia) Janette Husárová defeated (Czech Republic) Olga Blahotová / (Czech Republic) Gabriela Navrátilová 6–3, 6–2

- It was Gagliardi's 1st title of the year and the 1st of her career. It was Husárová's 2nd title of the year and the 17th of her career.
