= Dominik Meffert =

German tennis player

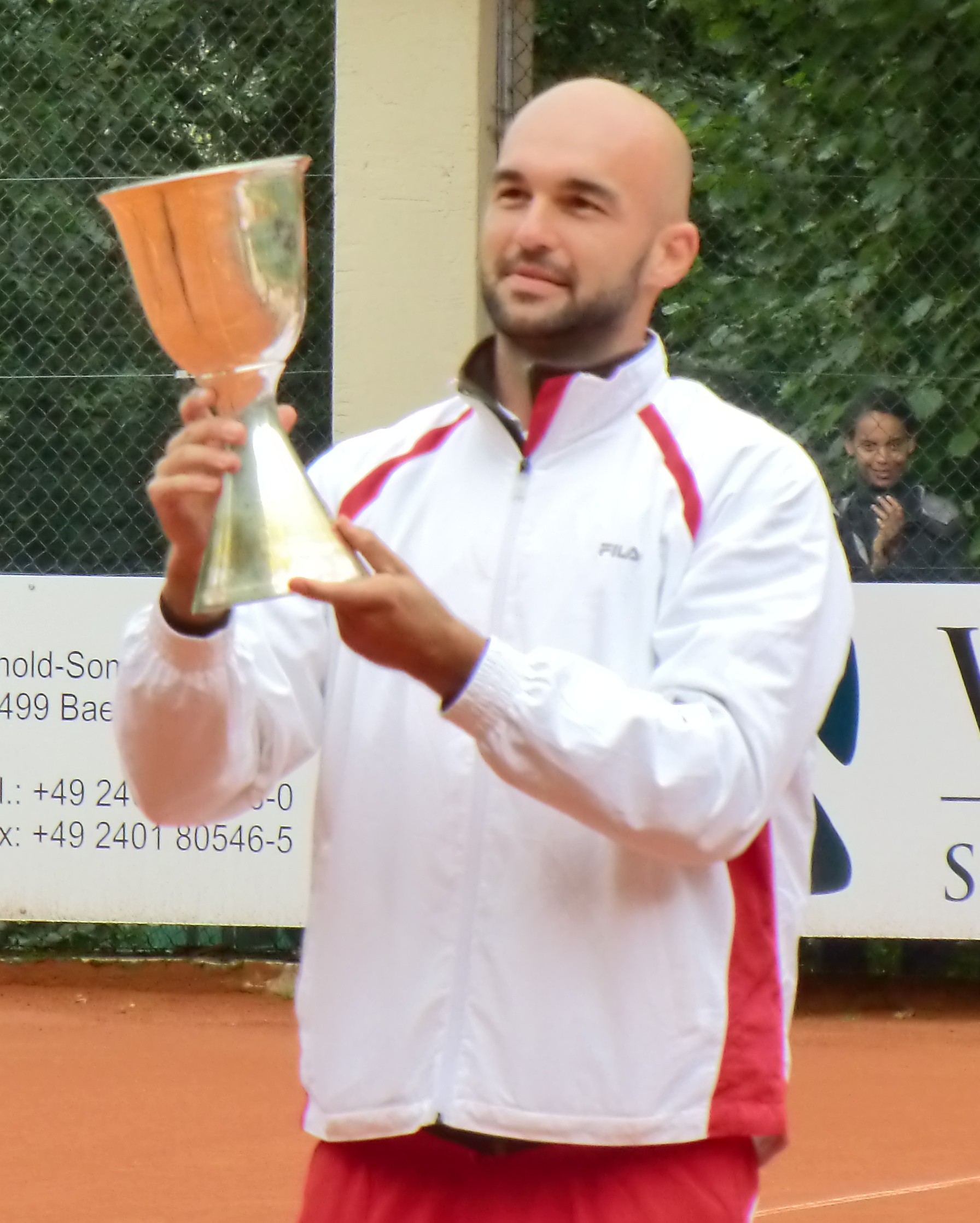
- Country (sports): Germany
- Residence: Cologne, Germany
- Born: 9 April 1981 (age 44) Mayen, Rhineland-Palatinate, West Germany
- Height: 1.98 m (6 ft 6 in)
- Turned pro: 2005
- Plays: Right-handed (two-handed backhand)
- Prize money: $ 513,278

Singles
- Career record: 5–8
- Career titles: 0
- Highest ranking: No. 161 (30 January 2012)

Grand Slam singles results
- Australian Open: Q2 (2007, 2008)
- French Open: Q2 (2011)
- Wimbledon: Q2 (2009, 2010, 2013)
- US Open: 1R (2007)

Doubles
- Career record: 7–8
- Career titles: 0
- Highest ranking: No. 91 (9 March 2015)

Grand Slam doubles results
- Wimbledon: 1R (2013)

Dominik Meffert (born 9 April 1981) is a German former professional tennis player. He qualified for the 2007 US Open, his only Grand Slam singles competition, but lost in the first round. He recorded a first round victory over 2003 French Open Champion Juan Carlos Ferrero at the 2010 Gerry Weber Open.

== Titles ==
=== Singles (5) ===
Legend (singles)
Grand Slam (0)
ATP World Tour Finals (0)
ATP World Tour Masters 1000 (0)
ATP World Tour 500 (0)
ATP World Tour 250 (0)
ATP Challenger Tour (4)
ITF Futures (1)

No.	Date	Tournament	Surface	Opponent	Score
1.	5 September 2005	Bagneres-De-Bigorre	Hard	(Germany) Philipp Hammer	7–6^{6}, 7–5
2.	17 August 2009	Geneva	Clay	(Monaco) Benjamin Balleret	6–3, 6–1
3.	25 April 2010	Curitiba	Clay	(Brazil) Ricardo Mello	6–4, 6–7^{3}, 6–2
4.	13 March 2011	Kyoto	Carpet (i)	(Germany) Cedrik-Marcel Stebe	4–6, 6–4, 6–2
5.	29 July 2012	Oberstaufen	Clay	(Germany) Nils Langer	6–4, 6–3

=== Doubles (8) ===
Legend (singles)
Grand Slam (0)
ATP World Tour Finals (0)
ATP World Tour Masters 1000 (0)
ATP World Tour 500 (0)
ATP World Tour 250 (0)
ATP Challenger Tour (8)

No.	Date	Tournament	Surface	Partner	Opponents	Score
1.	3 September 2006	Freudenstadt	Clay	(Germany) Tomas Behrend	(France) Alexandre Sidorenko (Germany) Mischa Zverev	7–5, 7–6^{5}
2.	28 January 2007	Durban	Hard	(South Africa) Rik de Voest	(Switzerland) Stéphane Bohli (Israel) Noam Okun	6–4, 6–2
3.	20 February 2010	Tanger	Clay	(Belgium) Steve Darcis	(Belarus) Uladzimir Ignatik (Slovakia) Martin Kližan	5–7, 7–5, [10–7]
4.	18 April 2010	Pereira	Clay	(Austria) Philipp Oswald	(Germany) Gero Kretschmer (Germany) Alex Satschko	6–7^{4}, 7–6^{6}, [10–5]
5.	25 April 2010	Curitiba	Clay	(Portugal) Leonardo Tavares	(Paraguay) Ramón Delgado (Brazil) André Sá	3–6, 6–2, [10–4]
6.	8 January 2011	Nouméa	Hard	(Denmark) Frederik Nielsen	(Italy) Flavio Cipolla (Italy) Simone Vagnozzi	7–6^{4}, 5–7, [10–5]
7.	12 March 2011	Kyoto	Carpet (i)	(Germany) Simon Stadler	(Germany) Andre Begemann (Australia) James Lemke	7–5, 2–6, [10–7]
8.	31 July 2011	Dortmund	Clay	(Germany) Björn Phau	(Russia) Teymuraz Gabashvili (Russia) Andrey Kuznetsov	6–4, 6–3
9.	4 May 2013	Tunis	Clay	(Austria) Philipp Oswald	(United Kingdom) Jamie Delgado (Sweden) Andreas Siljeström	3–6, 7–6^{(7–0)}, [10–7]
