= Leonardo Tavares =

Portuguese tennis player (born 1984)

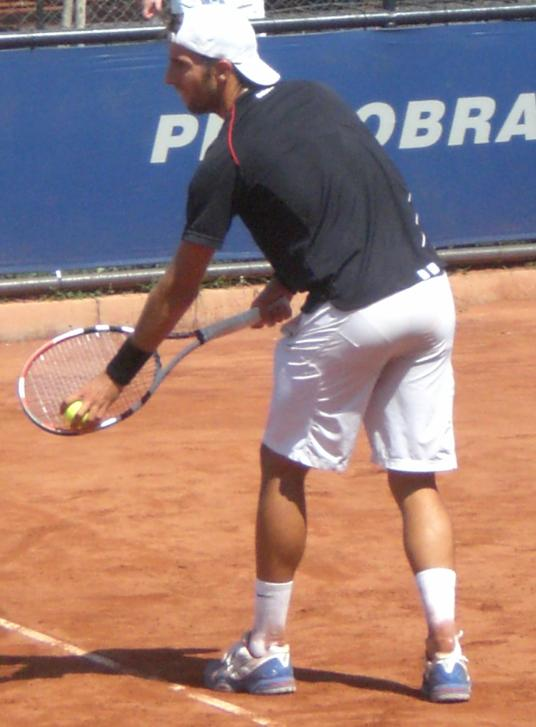
- Country (sports): Portugal
- Residence: Espinho, Portugal
- Born: 20 February 1984 (age 42) Espinho, Portugal
- Height: 1.85 m (6 ft 1 in)
- Turned pro: 2001
- Plays: Right-handed (two-handed backhand)
- Prize money: $183,352

Singles
- Career record: 6–10 (Note: The official ATP records are incomplete as they do not count one Davis Cup loss against Serbia and Montenegro in 2004.)
- Career titles: 0
- Highest ranking: No. 186 (16 August 2010)

Grand Slam singles results
- Australian Open: Q1 (2011)
- French Open: Q1 (2010)
- Wimbledon: Q1 (2010)
- US Open: Q1 (2010)

Doubles
- Career record: 15–16 (Note: The official ATP records are incomplete as they do not count one Davis Cup loss against Serbia and Montenegro in 2004.)
- Career titles: 0
- Highest ranking: No. 95 (13 September 2010)
- Last updated on: 10 April 2017.

Leonardo Tavares (born 20 February 1984) is a Portuguese professional tennis player. He has regularly competed on the ATP Challenger Tour throughout his career. In August 2010, he achieved a career-high singles world ranking of no. 186.

Earlier in his career, Tavares played in the ITF Men's Circuit. However, a breakthrough year in 2009 led him to his first Challenger final in August. He became a mainstay at that level, capturing several doubles titles and breaking into the top 100 doubles ranking. Tavares reached a career high no. 95 ranking in September 2010. He played regularly for the Portugal Davis Cup team between 2002 and 2011.

Tavares is currently inactive, having played his last tournament in May 2016.

== Career finals ==
=== ATP Challenger Tour ===
==== Singles: 2 (0 titles, 2 runners-up) ====
Legend ATP Challenger Tour Finals (0–0) ATP Challenger Tour (0–2)	Titles by surface Hard (0–0) Clay (0–2) Grass (0–0) Carpet (0–0)	Titles by setting Outdoors (0–2) Indoors (0–0)

Result	Date	Category	Tournament	Surface	Opponent	Score
Runner-up	30 August 2009	Challenger	Manerbio, Italy	Clay	(Argentina) Federico Delbonis	1–6, 3–6
Runner-up	1 August 2010	Challenger	Tampere, Finland	Clay	(France) Éric Prodon	4–6, 4–6

==== Doubles: 10 (5 titles, 5 runners-up) ====
Legend ATP Challenger Tour (5–5)	Titles by surface Hard (2–1) Clay (3–4) Grass (0–0) Carpet (0–0)	Titles by setting Outdoors (5–5) Indoors (0–0)

Outcome	Date	Category	Tournament	Surface	Partner	Opponents	Score
Winner	22 November 2009	Challenger	Cancún, Mexico	Hard	(Germany) Andre Begemann	(Canada) Adil Shamasdin (United States) Greg Ouellette	6–1, 6–7^{(6–7)}, [10–8]
Winner	25 April 2010	Challenger	Curitiba, Brazil	Clay	(Germany) Dominik Meffert	(Paraguay) Ramón Delgado (Brazil) André Sá	3–6, 6–2, [10–4]
Runner-up	30 May 2010	Challenger	Carson, United States	Hard	(Russia) Artem Sitak	(United States) Brian Battistone (United States) Nicholas Monroe	7–5, 3–6, [4–10]
Winner	6 June 2010	Challenger	Ojai, United States	Hard	(Russia) Artem Sitak	(India) Harsh Mankad (South Africa) Izak van der Merwe	4–6, 6–4, [10–8]
Winner	4 July 2010	Challenger	Braunschweig, Germany	Clay	(Italy) Simone Vagnozzi	(Russia) Igor Kunitsyn (Kazakhstan) Yuri Schukin	7–5, 7–6^{(7–4)}
Winner	1 August 2010	Challenger	Tampere, Finland	Clay	(Portugal) João Sousa	(Latvia) Andis Juška (Latvia) Deniss Pavlovs	7–6^{(7–3)}, 7–5
Runner-up	25 February 2011	Challenger	Casablanca, Morocco	Clay	(Italy) Simone Vagnozzi	(Spain) Guillermo Alcaide (Spain) Adrián Menéndez Maceiras	2–6, 1–6
Runner-up	16 April 2011	Challenger	Blumenau, Brazil	Clay	(Spain) Adrián Menéndez Maceiras	(Brazil) Franco Ferreiro (Brazil) André Sá	2–6, 6–3, [4–10]
Runner-up	17 June 2011	Challenger	Milan, Italy	Clay	(Italy) Andrea Arnaboldi	(Spain) Adrián Menéndez Maceiras (Italy) Simone Vagnozzi	6–0, 3–6, [5–10]
Runner-up	3 March 2012	Challenger	Florianópolis, Brazil	Clay	(Spain) Javier Martí	(Slovenia) Blaž Kavčič (Croatia) Antonio Veić	3–6, 3–6

=== ITF Men's Circuit ===
==== Singles: 7 (2 titles, 5 runners-up) ====
Category Futures (2–5)	Titles by surface Hard (1–2) Clay (1–3) Grass (0–0) Carpet (0–0)	Titles by setting Outdoors (2–5) Indoors (0–0)

Outcome	Date	Category	Tournament	Surface	Opponent	Score
Runner-up	7 June 2004	Futures	Riyadh, Saudi Arabia F2	Hard	(Pakistan) Aisam-ul-Haq Qureshi	4–6, 7–6^{(7–5)}, 3–6
Runner-up	11 October 2004	Futures	Santa Cruz, Bolivia F2	Clay	(Argentina) Cristian Villagrán	3–6, 3–6
Winner	15 October 2007	Futures	Porto, Portugal F4	Clay	(Argentina) Cristian Villagrán	4–6, 6–1, 6–2
Runner-up	8 August 2008	Futures	Wahlstedt, Germany F16	Clay	(Chile) Adrián García	3–6, 6–4, 0–6
Winner	6 April 2009	Futures	Albufeira, Portugal F3	Hard	(Netherlands) Raemon Sluiter	6–3, 6–4
Runner-up	17 March 2013	Futures	Guimarães, Portugal F4	Hard	(France) Jules Marie	4–6, 6–3, 4–6
Runner-up	15 November 2014	Futures	Casablanca, Morocco F5	Clay	(Spain) Oriol Roca Batalla	3–6, 3–6

==== Doubles: 25 (13 titles, 12 runners-up) ====
Category Futures (13–12)	Titles by surface Hard (5–5) Clay (8–7) Grass (0–0) Carpet (0–0)	Titles by setting Outdoors (13–12) Indoors (0–0)

Outcome	Date	Category	Tournament	Surface	Partner	Opponents	Score
Runner-up	18 June 2001	Futures	Agadir, Morocco F3	Clay	(Portugal) João Paulo Magalhães	(Australia) Kane Dewhurst (Australia) David McNamara	0–6, 1–6
Runner-up	17 November 2002	Futures	Nonthaburi, Thailand F2	Hard	(Portugal) Tiago Godinho	(Japan) Hiroki Kondo (Japan) Michihisa Onoda	3–6, 2–6
Runner-up	24 November 2002	Futures	Hanoi, Vietnam F1	Hard	(Portugal) Tiago Godinho	(South Africa) Johan Du Randt (South Africa) Dirk Stegmann	5–7, 6–7^{(2–7)}
Winner	15 June 2003	Futures	Lisbon, Portugal F8	Clay	(India) Harsh Mankad	(France) Baptiste Dupuy (France) Gregory Girault	6–1, 6–2
Winner	22 June 2003	Futures	Lisbon, Portugal F9	Clay	(India) Harsh Mankad	(France) Fábrice Betencourt (India) Baptiste Dupuy	6–4, 6–3
Runner-up	28 June 2003	Futures	Lisbon, Portugal F10	Clay	(Portugal) Jorge Laranjeiro	(Portugal) Tiago Godinho (Portugal) António van Grichen	4–6, 4–6
Runner-up	22 March 2004	Futures	Albufeira, Portugal F2	Hard	(Portugal) Frederico Gil	(Chile) Juan Ignacio Cerda (Netherlands) Jasper Smit	4–6, 4–6
Winner	7 June 2004	Futures	Riyadh, Saudi Arabia F1	Hard	(United Kingdom) Jamie Delgado	(India) Mustafa Ghouse (Venezuela) Jhonnatan Medina-Álvarez	6–2, 3–6, 6–3
Runner-up	4 October 2004	Futures	La Paz, Bolivia F1	Clay	(Argentina) Guillermo Carry	(Colombia) Michael Quintero (Colombia) Carlos Salamanca	5–7, 4–6
Runner-up	21 March 2005	Futures	Lagos, Portugal F3	Hard	(Portugal) Frederico Gil	(Sweden) Richard Holstrom (Sweden) Christian Johansson	walkover
Winner	29 May 2006	Futures	Naples, Italy F14	Clay	(Brazil) Marcelo Melo	(Latvia) Deniss Pavlovs (Italy) Giancarlo Petrazzuolo	6–3, 6–2
Runner-up	16 April 2007	Futures	Cairo, Egypt F1	Clay	(Spain) Cesar Ferrer-Victoria	(Romania) Adrian Cruciat (Romania) Cătălin-Ionuț Gârd	4–6, 7–5, 4–6
Runner-up	25 June 2007	Futures	Minsk, Belarus F3	Clay	(Spain) Cesar Ferrer-Victoria	(Russia) Mikhail Elgin (Russia) Alexandre Krasnoroutskiy	4–6, 0–6
Runner-up	30 July 2007	Futures	Saint-Gervais-les-Bains, France F11	Clay	(Ukraine) Ivan Sergeyev	(France) Jonathan Eysseric (France) Adrian Mannarino	1–6, 4–6
Winner	13 October 2008	Futures	Porto, Portugal F7	Clay	(Portugal) Nuno Marques	(Ukraine) Vladislav Bondarenko (Ukraine) Vladyslav Klymenko	6–4, 6–3
Runner-up	20 October 2008	Futures	Espinho, Portugal F8	Clay	(Spain) Javier Martí	(Ukraine) Vladislav Bondarenko (Ukraine) Vladyslav Klymenko	4–6, 6–3, [5–10]
Runner-up	16 February 2009	Futures	Abidjan, Ivory Coast F1	Hard	(Germany) Andre Begemann	(Canada) Pierre-Ludovic Duclos (Austria) Andreas Haider-Maurer	1–6, 7–6^{(7–5)}, [12–14]
Winner	27 June 2009	Futures	Toulon, France F9	Clay	(France) Augustin Gensse	(France) Julien Jeanpierre (France) Nicolas Renavand	6–2, 6–2
Winner	15 August 2009	Futures	Bolzano, Italy F23	Clay	(Italy) Manuel Jorquera	(Romania) Marius Copil (Netherlands) Antal van der Duim	6–7^{(2–7)}, 6–3, [10–5]
Winner	24 February 2012	Futures	Itajaí, Brazil F8	Clay	(Montenegro) Goran Tošić	(France) Jonathan Eysseric (Brazil) Fernando Romboli	1–6, 6–3, [10–8]
Winner	4 October 2014	Futures	Oliveira de Azeméis, Portugal F8	Hard	(Portugal) Frederico Gil	(Portugal) Romain Barbosa (Portugal) Frederico Ferreira Silva	6–1, 3–6, [10–4]
Winner	11 October 2014	Futures	Porto, Portugal F9	Clay	(Portugal) Frederico Gil	(Portugal) Romain Barbosa (Portugal) Frederico Ferreira Silva	2–6, 6–3, [10–6]
Winner	1 November 2014	Futures	Elvas, Portugal F12	Hard	(Portugal) Romain Barbosa	(Spain) Jaime Pulgar-Garcia (Spain) Javier Pulgar-Garcia	walkover
Winner	1 March 2015	Futures	Vale do Lobo, Portugal F1	Hard	(Portugal) Romain Barbosa	(Spain) Juan-Samuel Arauzo-Martinez (Spain) Ivan Arenas-Gualda	3–6, 6–3, [10–6]
Winner	15 March 2015	Futures	Loulé, Portugal F3	Hard	(Portugal) Romain Barbosa	(Portugal) João Domingues (Portugal) David Vega Hernández	6–1, 4–6, [12–10]

== Performance timelines ==
Key
W	F	SF	QF	#R	RR	Q#	P#	DNQ	A	Z#	PO	G	S	B	NMS	NTI	P	NH

(W) winner; (F) finalist; (SF) semifinalist; (QF) quarterfinalist; (#R) rounds 4, 3, 2, 1; (RR) round-robin stage; (Q#) qualification round; (P#) preliminary round; (DNQ) did not qualify; (A) absent; (Z#) Davis/Fed Cup Zonal Group (with number indication) or (PO) play-off; (G) gold, (S) silver or (B) bronze Olympic/Paralympic medal; (NMS) not a Masters tournament; (NTI) not a Tier I tournament; (P) postponed; (NH) not held; (SR) strike rate (events won / competed); (W–L) win–loss record.
To avoid confusion and double counting, these charts are updated at the conclusion of a tournament or when the player's participation has ended.

Current through 2016 ATP World Tour.

=== Singles ===
Tournament	2002	2003	2004	2005	2006	2007	2008	2009	2010	2011	2012	2013	2014	2015	2016	SR	W–L	Win %
Grand Slam tournaments
Australian Open	A	A	A	A	A	A	A	A	A	Q1	A	A	A	A	A	0 / 0	0–0	N/A
French Open	A	A	A	A	A	A	A	A	Q1	A	A	A	A	A	A	0 / 0	0–0	N/A
Wimbledon	A	A	A	A	A	A	A	A	Q1	A	A	A	A	A	A	0 / 0	0–0	N/A
US Open	A	A	A	A	A	A	A	A	Q1	A	A	A	A	A	A	0 / 0	0–0	N/A
Win–loss	0–0	0–0	0–0	0–0	0–0	0–0	0–0	0–0	0–0	0–0	0–0	0–0	0–0	0–0	0–0	0 / 0	0–0	N/A
National representation
Summer Olympics	Not Held		A	Not Held			A	Not Held			A	Not Held			A	0 / 0	0–0	N/A
Davis Cup	Z1	Z2	Z2	Z2	Z1	A	Z2	Z2	Z2	Z1	A	A	A	A	A	0 / 9	5–9	36%
Career statistics
	2002	2003	2004	2005	2006	2007	2008	2009	2010	2011	2012	2013	2014	2015	2016	SR	W–L	Win %
Tournaments	0	0	1	0	0	0	0	0	1	0	0	0	0	0	0	2		
Titles	0	0	0	0	0	0	0	0	0	0	0	0	0	0	0	0		
Finals	0	0	0	0	0	0	0	0	0	0	0	0	0	0	0	0		
Hard win–loss	0–0	0–2	1–0	0–0	0–0	0–0	0–1	0–0	0–0	0–1	0–0	0–0	0–0	0–0	0–0	0 / 0	1–4	20%
Clay win–loss	0–0	0–1	0–2	1–0	0–0	0–0	1–0	1–0	1–2	0–0	0–0	0–0	0–0	0–0	0–0	0 / 2	4–5	44%
Grass win–loss	0–0	0–0	0–0	0–0	0–0	0–0	0–0	0–0	0–0	0–0	0–0	0–0	0–0	0–0	0–0	0 / 0	0–0	N/A
Carpet win–loss	0–2	0–0	0–0	1–0	0–0	0–0	0–0	Discontinued								0 / 0	1–2	33%
Outdoor Win–loss	0–0	0–3	1–2	1–0	0–0	0–0	1–0	1–0	1–1	0–0	0–0	0–0	0–0	0–0	0–0	0 / 2	5–6	45%
Indoor win–loss	0–2	0–0	0–0	1–0	0–0	0–0	0–1	0–0	0–1	0–1	0–0	0–0	0–0	0–0	0–0	0 / 0	1–5	17%
Overall win–loss	0–2	0–3	1–2	2–0	0–0	0–0	1–1	1–0	1–2	0–1	0–0	0–0	0–0	0–0	0–0	0 / 2	6–11	35%
Win (%)	0%	0%	33%	100%	N/A	N/A	50%	100%	33%	0%	N/A	N/A	N/A	N/A	N/A	35.29%		
Year-end ranking	920	715	444	625	1024	504	606	262	234	759	1048	686	726	1367	–	$ 183,352		

=== Doubles ===
Tournament	2002	2003	2004	2005	2006	2007	2008	2009	2010	2011	2012	2013	2014	2015	2016	SR	W–L	Win %
National representation
Summer Olympics	Not Held		A	Not Held			A	Not Held			A	Not Held			A	0 / 0	0–0	N/A
Davis Cup	Z1	Z2	Z2	Z2	Z1	A	Z2	Z2	Z2	Z1	A	A	A	A	A	0 / 9	10–7	63%
Career statistics
	2002	2003	2004	2005	2006	2007	2008	2009	2010	2011	2012	2013	2014	2015	2016	SR	W–L	Win %
Tournaments	0	0	1	1	1	0	1	0	1	3	0	1	0	0	0	9		
Titles	0	0	0	0	0	0	0	0	0	0	0	0	0	0	0	0		
Finals	0	0	0	0	0	0	0	0	0	0	0	0	0	0	0	0		
Hard win–loss	0–0	0–1	1–0	0–0	0–1	0–0	0–1	0–1	0–0	0–1	0–0	0–0	0–0	0–0	0–0	0 / 0	1–5	17%
Clay win–loss	0–0	0–0	1–2	2–1	1–1	0–0	1–1	1–0	5–1	1–4	0–0	0–1	0–0	0–0	0–0	0 / 9	12–11	55%
Grass win–loss	0–0	0–0	0–0	0–0	0–0	0–0	0–0	0–0	0–0	0–0	0–0	0–0	0–0	0–0	0–0	0 / 0	0–0	N/A
Carpet win–loss	0–0	0–0	0–0	1–0	0–0	0–0	1–0	Discontinued								0 / 0	2–0	100%
Outdoor Win–loss	0–0	0–1	2–2	2–1	1–1	0–0	2–1	1–1	4–1	1–4	0–0	0–1	0–0	0–0	0–0	0 / 9	13–13	50%
Indoor win–loss	0–0	0–0	0–0	1–0	0–1	0–0	0–1	0–0	1–0	0–1	0–0	0–0	0–0	0–0	0–0	0 / 0	2–3	40%
Overall win–loss	0–0	0–1	2–2	3–1	1–2	0–0	2–2	1–1	5–1	1–5	0–0	0–1	0–0	0–0	0–0	0 / 9	15–16	48%
Win (%)	N/A	0%	50%	75%	33%	N/A	50%	50%	83%	17%	N/A	0%	N/A	N/A	N/A	48.39%		
Year-end ranking	532	528	375	531	554	775	731	230	125	256	598	1312	746	881	–	$60,445		

== Wins over top 10 players ==
Type	2002	2003	2004	2005	2006	2007	2008	2009	2010	2011	2012	2013	2014	2015	2016	Total
Singles	0	0	0	0	0	0	0	0	0	0	0	0	0	0	0	0
Doubles	0	0	0	0	0	0	0	0	0	1	0	0	0	0	0	1

=== Doubles ===
#	Partner	Opponents	Ranking	Category	Tournament	Surface	Round	Score	Tavares Ranking
2011
1.	(Argentina) Carlos Berlocq	(Poland) Łukasz Kubot (Austria) Oliver Marach	10; 11	250 series	Brasil Open, Brazil	Clay	1R	7–6^{(8–6)}, 7–5	120

== Head-to-head vs. Top 20 players ==
This section contains Tavares' win–loss record against players who have been ranked 20th or higher in the world rankings during their careers.

Opponent	Highest rank	Matches	Won	Lost	Win %	Last match	Ref
(Switzerland) Stan Wawrinka	3	1	0	1	0.00%	Lost (6–7^{(1–7)}, 0–6) at the 2011 Davis Cup	
Total		1	0	1	0.00%	Statistics correct as of 10 April 2017	

== Career earnings ==
Year	Major titles	ATP titles	Total titles	Earnings	Ref
2002	0	0	0	$2,108	
2003	0	0	0	$5,205	
2004	0	0	0	$18,369	
2005	0	0	0	$6,557	
2006	0	0	0	$7,277	
2007	0	0	0	$9,778	
2008	0	0	0	$9,017	
2009	0	0	0	$25,970	
2010	0	0	0	$63,912	
2011	0	0	0	$18,180	
2012	0	0	0	$2,420	
2013	0	0	0	$5,618	
2014	0	0	0	$4,242	
2015	0	0	0	$2,477	
2016	0	0	0	* $192	
Career *	0	0	0	$183,352	

* As of 10 April 2017.

== National participation ==
=== Davis Cup (15 wins, 16 losses) ===
Tavares debuted for the Portugal Davis Cup team in 2002 and has played 31 matches in 20 ties. His singles record is 5–9 and his doubles record is 10–7 (15–16 overall).

Group membership World Group (0–0) WG Play-off (0–0) Group I (0–6) Group II (15–10) Group III (0–0) Group IV (0–0)	Matches by surface Hard (2–9) Clay (11–5) Grass (0–0) Carpet (2–2)	Matches by type Singles (5–9) Doubles (10–7)	Matches by setting Indoors (3–8) Outdoors (12–8)	Matches by venue Portugal (9–5) Away (6–11)

- ▲ ▼ indicates the result of the Davis Cup match followed by the score, date, place of event, the zonal classification and its phase, and the court surface.

Rubber result	Rubber	Match type (partner if any)	Opponent nation	Opponent player(s)	Score
▼1–4; 12–14 July 2002; Olympic Training Centre, Minsk, Belarus; Group I Europe/Africa Quarterfinals; Carpet(i) surface
Defeat	IV	Singles (dead rubber)	Belarus	Alexander Shvets	2–6, 6–7^{(4–7)}
▼1–4; 20–22 September 2002; Follonica T.C., Follonica, Italy; Group I Europe/Africa Relegation Play-off; Carpet(i) surface
Defeat	II	Singles	Italy	Davide Sanguinetti	3–6, 2–6, 1–6
▲4–1; 4–6 April 2003; Complexo Municipal de Ténis, Maia, Portugal; Group II Europe/Africa First Round; Clay surface
Defeat	V	Singles (dead rubber)	Monaco	Emmanuel Heussner	2–6, 4–6
▼0–5; 11–13 July 2003; Westridge Park, Durban, South Africa; Group II Europe/Africa Quarterfinal; Hard surface
Defeat	II	Singles	South Africa	Wesley Moodie	3–6, 4–6, 6–1, 6–7^{(7–9)}
Defeat	III	Doubles (with Rui Machado)	South Africa	Chris Haggard / Robbie Koenig	5–7, 3–6, 2–6
Defeat	V	Singles (dead rubber)	South Africa	Rik de Voest	1–6, 4–6
▲3–2; 9–11 April 2004; Centre National de Tennis, Tunis, Tunisia; Group II Europe/Africa First Round; Hard surface
Victory	I	Singles	Tunisia	Haythem Abid	7–6^{(7–5)}, 6–1, 4–6, 6–2
Victory	III	Doubles (with Frederico Gil)	Tunisia	Haythem Abid / Malek Jaziri	7–5, 6–3, 6–2
▼0–5; 16–18 July 2004; Complexo Municipal de Ténis da Maia, Maia, Portugal; Group II Europe/Africa Quarterfinal; Clay surface
Defeat	I	Singles	Serbia and Montenegro	Boris Pašanski	6–3, 1–6, 6–1, 1–6, 2–6
Defeat	III	Doubles (with Frederico Gil)	Serbia and Montenegro	Nikola Ćirić / Dušan Vemić	6–1, 7–6^{(7–5)}, 3–6, 1–6, 4–6
▲4–1; 4–6 March 2005; Kadrioru Tennis Center, Tallinn, Estonia; Group II Europe/Africa First Round; Carpet(i) surface
Victory	II	Singles	Estonia	Alti Vahkal	3–6, 2–6, 6–2, 7–6^{(7–5)}, 6–4
Victory	III	Doubles (with Frederico Gil)	Estonia	Mait Künnap / Alti Vahkal	6–3, 6–4, 6–4
▲3–2; 15–17 July 2005; Estádio Nacional, Lisbon, Portugal; Group II Europe/Africa Quarterfinal; Clay surface
Victory	III	Doubles (with Frederico Gil)	Algeria	Abdel-Hak Hameurlaine / Slimane Saoudi	6–7^{(3–7)}, 6–3, 6–1, 7–6^{(7–3)}
▲4–1; 23–25 September 2005; Clube de Ténis do Estoril, Estoril, Portugal; Group II Europe/Africa Semifinal; Clay surface
Victory	III	Doubles (with Frederico Gil)	Slovenia	Rok Jarc / Grega Žemlja	6–4, 6–2, 6–4
Victory	V	Singles	Slovenia	Marko Tkalec	6–4, 7–5
▼1–4; 10–12 February 2006; National Tennis Centre, Esch-sur-Alzette, Luxembourg; Group I Europe/Africa First Round; Hard(i) surface
Defeat	III	Doubles (with Frederico Gil)	Luxembourg	Gilles Müller / Mike Scheidweiler	6–4, 3–6, 5–7, 1–6
▲4–1; 11–13 April 2008; Clube de Ténis do Estoril, Estoril, Portugal; Group II Europe/Africa First Round; Clay surface
Victory	III	Doubles (with Gastão Elias)	Tunisia	Walid Jallali / Malek Jaziri	6–3, 6–3, 6–3
Victory	II	Singles (dead rubber)	Tunisia	Slah Mbarek	6–2, 6–4
▲5–0; 18–20 July 2008; Lawn Tennis Club da Foz, Porto, Portugal; Group II Europe/Africa Quarterfinal; Clay surface
Victory	III	Doubles (with Frederico Gil)	Cyprus	Photos Kallias / Demetrios Leontis	6–2, 6–1, 5–7, 6–3
▼0–5; 19–21 September 2008; Megaron Tennis Club, Dnipropetrovsk, Ukraine; Group II Europe/Africa Semifinal; Hard (i) surface
Defeat	III	Doubles (with Gastão Elias)	Ukraine	Sergei Bubka / Sergiy Stakhovsky	3–6, 2–6, 4–6
Defeat	V	Singles (dead rubber)	Ukraine	Ivan Sergeyev	6–7^{(6–8)}, 6–4, 3–6
▼2–3; 6–8 March 2009; National Tennis Centre, Nicosia, Cyprus; Group II Europe/Africa First Round; Hard surface
Defeat	III	Doubles (with Frederico Gil)	Cyprus	Marcos Baghdatis / Photos Kallias	4–6, 6–3, 6–4, 3–6, 1–6
▲5–0; 10–12 July 2009; Office des parc Omnisport Wilaya d'Oran, Oran, Algeria; Group II Europe/Africa Relegation Play-off; Clay surface
Victory	III	Doubles (with Frederico Gil)	Algeria	Abdel-Hak Hameurlaine / Valentin Rahmine	6–1, 6–2, 6–3
Victory	V	Singles (dead rubber)	Algeria	Valentin Rahmine	6–1, 6–0
▲4–1; 5–7 March 2010; Complexo de Ténis da Maia, Maia, Portugal; Group II Europe/Africa First Round; Clay(i) surface
Victory	III	Doubles (with Frederico Gil)	Denmark	Frederik Nielsen / Martin Pedersen	6–4, 6–3, 6–1
Defeat	V	Singles (dead rubber)	Denmark	Martin Pedersen	5–7, 4–6
▲5–0; 9–11 July 2010; Centro de Ténis do Jamor, Cruz Quebrada, Portugal; Group II Europe/Africa Quarterfinal; Clay surface
Victory	III	Doubles (with Frederico Gil)	Cyprus	Eleftherios Christou / Rareș Cuzdriorean	6–2, 6–1, 6–3
▲3–2; 17–19 September 2010; Centro de Ténis do Jamor, Cruz Quebrada, Portugal; Group II Europe/Africa Semifinal; Clay surface
Victory	III	Doubles (with Frederico Gil)	Bosnia and Herzegovina	Amer Delić / Aldin Šetkić	6–1, 6–4, 4–6, 6–4
▲4–1; 4–6 March 2011; Centro Desportivo Nacional do Jamor, Cruz Quebrada, Portugal; Group I Europe/Africa First Round; Clay surface
Defeat	III	Doubles (with Frederico Gil)	Slovakia	Michal Mertiňák / Filip Polášek	6–4, 3–6, 6–4, 6–0
▼0–5; 8–10 July 2011; PostFinance-Arena, Bern, Switzerland; Group I Europe/Africa Quarterfinal; Hard(i) surface
Defeat	III	Doubles (with Frederico Gil)	Switzerland	Roger Federer / Stan Wawrinka	3–6, 4–6, 4–6
Defeat	V	Singles (dead rubber)	Switzerland	Stan Wawrinka	6–7^{(1–7)}, 0–6

== Awards ==
- 2013 – ITF Commitment Award
