= 2010 Wimbledon Championships – Women's singles qualifying =

Women's singles qualifying
- 2010 Wimbledon Championships

Events
Singles	men	women		boys	girls
Doubles	men	women	mixed	boys	girls
WC Singles	men	women	quad
WC Doubles	men	women	quad
Legends	men	women	seniors

Qualification
Singles	men	women
Doubles	men	women
- Wimbledon Championships

Players and pairs who neither have high enough rankings nor receive wild cards may participate in a qualifying tournament held one week before the annual Wimbledon Tennis Championships.

== Seeds ==
1. (Estonia) Kaia Kanepi (qualified)
2. (Sweden) Johanna Larsson (first round)
3. (Russia) Ksenia Pervak (second round)
4. (United States) Bethanie Mattek-Sands (qualified)
5. (China) Zhang Shuai (second round)
6. (Romania) Simona Halep (second round)
7. (Russia) Evgeniya Rodina (second round)
8. (Austria) Patricia Mayr (first round)
9. (Australia) Sophie Ferguson (first round)
10. (Russia) Ekaterina Bychkova (second round)
11. (Italy) Maria Elena Camerin (moved to main Draw)
12. (Slovenia) Maša Zec Peškirič (second round)
13. (Netherlands) Michaëlla Krajicek (qualifying competition)
14. (Canada) Stéphanie Dubois (qualifying competition, lucky loser)
15. (Russia) Vesna Manasieva (qualifying competition)
16. (Russia) Anastasia Pivovarova (qualifying competition, lucky loser)
17. (United States) Shenay Perry (qualified)
18. (United States) Lilia Osterloh (first round)
19. (Germany) Kathrin Wörle (first round)
20. (Hungary) Gréta Arn (qualified)
21. (Australia) Jelena Dokic (second round)
22. (Czech Republic) Andrea Hlaváčková (qualified)
23. (France) Stéphanie Cohen-Aloro (first round)
24. (Slovakia) Kristína Kučová (first round)

== Qualifiers ==
1. (Estonia) Kaia Kanepi
2. (Spain) Nuria Llagostera Vives
3. (Italy) Romina Oprandi
4. (United States) Bethanie Mattek-Sands
5. (United States) Shenay Perry
6. (Belarus) Anastasiya Yakimova
7. (Hungary) Gréta Arn
8. (Croatia) Mirjana Lučić
9. (Japan) Kurumi Nara
10. (Romania) Monica Niculescu
11. (Czech Republic) Andrea Hlaváčková
12. (Greece) Eleni Daniilidou

== Lucky losers ==
1. (Canada) Stéphanie Dubois
2. (Russia) Anastasia Pivovarova

== Qualifying draw ==
=== First qualifier ===
First round
1	(Estonia) Kaia Kanepi	6	7
(Ukraine) Olga Savchuk	1	5
(Russia) Elena Bovina	4	6	11
(Luxembourg) Mandy Minella	6	4	9
(Russia) Arina Rodionova	0	0
(Belarus) Ekaterina Dzehalevich	6	6
(Croatia) Ajla Tomljanović	1	6	6
24	(Slovakia) Kristína Kučová	6	4	1

Second round
1	(Estonia) Kaia Kanepi	6	6
(Russia) Elena Bovina	1	2
(Belarus) Ekaterina Dzehalevich	4	3
(Croatia) Ajla Tomljanović	6	6

Qualifying competition
1	(Estonia) Kaia Kanepi	6	6
(Croatia) Ajla Tomljanović	1	2

=== Second qualifier ===
First round
2	(Sweden) Johanna Larsson	6	3	4
(Kazakhstan) Sesil Karatantcheva	4	6	6
(Spain) Nuria Llagostera Vives	6	6
(Belarus) Darya Kustova	2	1
(China) Han Xinyun	5	7	8
(Germany) Julia Schruff	7	5	6
(United States) Lauren Albanese	2	1
15	(Russia) Vesna Manasieva	6	6

Second round
(Kazakhstan) Sesil Karatantcheva	3	6	3
(Spain) Nuria Llagostera Vives	6	2	6
(China) Han Xinyun	2	3
15	(Russia) Vesna Manasieva	6	6

Qualifying competition
(Spain) Nuria Llagostera Vives	7^{7}	6
15	(Russia) Vesna Manasieva	6^{4}	4

=== Third qualifier ===
First round
3	(Russia) Ksenia Pervak	6	7
(Russia) Alexandra Panova	2	5
(Italy) Romina Oprandi	6	6
(Hungary) Anikó Kapros	1	1
(Russia) Ekaterina Ivanova	6	6
(Hungary) Katalin Marosi	1	4
(Australia) Shannon Golds	7^{7}	6
23	(France) Stéphanie Cohen-Aloro	6^{3}	4

Second round
3	(Russia) Ksenia Pervak	3	4
(Italy) Romina Oprandi	6	6
(Russia) Ekaterina Ivanova	6	6
(Australia) Shannon Golds	2	2

Qualifying competition
(Italy) Romina Oprandi	6	4	6
(Russia) Ekaterina Ivanova	3	6	4

=== Fourth qualifier ===
First round
4	(United States) Bethanie Mattek-Sands	6	6
(Belarus) Iryna Kuryanovich	2	1
(Russia) Nina Bratchikova	7^{7}	6
(Russia) Elena Chalova	6^{2}	1
PR	(United States) Julie Ditty	6	6
(Georgia (country)) Margalita Chakhnashvili	4	3
(Austria) Melanie Klaffner	2	1
21	(Australia) Jelena Dokic	6	6

Second round
4	(United States) Bethanie Mattek-Sands	6	0	6
(Russia) Nina Bratchikova	3	6	2
PR	(United States) Julie Ditty	5	7	6
21	(Australia) Jelena Dokic	7	5	2

Qualifying competition
4	(United States) Bethanie Mattek-Sands	6	4	6
PR	(United States) Julie Ditty	1	6	4

=== Fifth qualifier ===
First round
5	(China) Zhang Shuai	6	6^{2}	6
(Georgia (country)) Anna Tatishvili	1	7^{7}	2
(United States) Julia Cohen	3	6^{4}
(France) Séverine Beltrame	6	7^{7}
WC	(United Kingdom) Emily Webley-Smith	7^{7}	6^{6}	3
WC	(New Zealand) Marina Erakovic	6^{5}	7^{8}	6
WC	(United Kingdom) Lucy Brown	2	5
17	(United States) Shenay Perry	6	7

Second round
5	(China) Zhang Shuai	0	2
(France) Séverine Beltrame	6	6
WC	(New Zealand) Marina Erakovic	4	2
17	(United States) Shenay Perry	6	6

Qualifying competition
(France) Séverine Beltrame	6	4	3
17	(United States) Shenay Perry	3	6	6

=== Sixth qualifier ===
First round
6	(Romania) Simona Halep	6^{8}	7^{7}	6
(France) Youlia Fedossova	7^{10}	6^{2}	2
(Belarus) Anastasiya Yakimova	6	7^{7}
(Canada) Rebecca Marino	4	6^{3}
(Japan) Misaki Doi	4	7	8
(Croatia) Ivana Lisjak	6	5	6
(Italy) Corinna Dentoni	6	2	6
18	(United States) Lilia Osterloh	4	6	4

Second round
6	(Romania) Simona Halep	4	1
(Belarus) Anastasiya Yakimova	6	6
(Japan) Misaki Doi	6	6
(Italy) Corinna Dentoni	4	2

Qualifying competition
(Belarus) Anastasiya Yakimova	2	6	6
(Japan) Misaki Doi	6	4	4

=== Seventh qualifier ===
First round
7	(Russia) Evgeniya Rodina	6	6
(Spain) Laura Pous Tió	4	2
(Spain) Beatriz García Vidagany	4	7^{11}	6
(France) Olivia Sanchez	6	6^{9}	3
(Kyrgyzstan) Ksenia Palkina	2	1
(United States) Madison Brengle	6	6
(Ukraine) Irina Buryachok	2	4
20	(Hungary) Gréta Arn	6	6

Second round
7	(Russia) Evgeniya Rodina	4	2
(Spain) Beatriz García Vidagany	6	6
(United States) Madison Brengle	1	6^{3}
20	(Hungary) Gréta Arn	6	7^{7}

Qualifying competition
(Spain) Beatriz García Vidagany	7	3	2
20	(Hungary) Gréta Arn	5	6	6

=== Eighth qualifier ===
First round
8	(Austria) Patricia Mayr	2	3
(Czech Republic) Eva Birnerová	6	6
(Croatia) Mirjana Lučić	6	6
WC	(United Kingdom) Anna Smith	4	2
(Czech Republic) Zuzana Ondrášková	4	6	6
(Japan) Rika Fujiwara	6	3	0
(Portugal) Neuza Silva	1	3
13	(Netherlands) Michaëlla Krajicek	6	6

Second round
(Czech Republic) Eva Birnerová	1	5
(Croatia) Mirjana Lučić	6	7
(Czech Republic) Zuzana Ondrášková	2	3
13	(Netherlands) Michaëlla Krajicek	6	6

Qualifying competition
(Croatia) Mirjana Lučić	6	6
13	(Netherlands) Michaëlla Krajicek	3	2

=== Ninth qualifier ===
First round
9	(Australia) Sophie Ferguson	6	3	2
(Japan) Kurumi Nara	3	6	6
WC	(Austria) Tamira Paszek	6	6
(Romania) Irina-Camelia Begu	4	2
(Austria) Nikola Hofmanova	6	6
WC	(United Kingdom) Naomi Broady	4	4
(Spain) Eloisa Compostizo de Andrés	1	1
14	(Canada) Stéphanie Dubois	6	6

Second round
(Japan) Kurumi Nara	7	6
WC	(Austria) Tamira Paszek	5	4
(Austria) Nikola Hofmanova	6^{4}	4
14	(Canada) Stéphanie Dubois	7^{7}	6

Qualifying competition
(Japan) Kurumi Nara	7^{7}	6
14	(Canada) Stéphanie Dubois	6^{2}	4

=== Tenth qualifier ===
First round
10	(Russia) Ekaterina Bychkova	3	6	6
(Australia) Olivia Rogowska	6	2	3
(Japan) Junri Namigata	6	4	14
(Czech Republic) Karolína Plíšková	2	6	12
WC	(United Kingdom) Jocelyn Rae	3	4
(Romania) Monica Niculescu	6	6
(Russia) Vitalia Diatchenko	6	6
19	(Germany) Kathrin Wörle	2	3

Second round
10	(Russia) Ekaterina Bychkova	6	4	4
(Japan) Junri Namigata	3	6	6
(Romania) Monica Niculescu	7	6
(Russia) Vitalia Diatchenko	5	2

Qualifying competition
(Japan) Junri Namigata	4	0
(Romania) Monica Niculescu	6	6

=== Eleventh qualifier ===
First round
Alt	(Germany) Mona Barthel	5	6	2
(Italy) Anna Floris	7	3	6
WC	(United Kingdom) Lisa Whybourn	6	7^{7}
(Australia) Sally Peers	4	6^{3}
(United Kingdom) Naomi Cavaday	6	3	6
(Ukraine) Lesia Tsurenko	2	6	3
(Georgia (country)) Oksana Kalashnikova	5	6	3
22	(Czech Republic) Andrea Hlaváčková	7	4	6

Second round
(Italy) Anna Floris	1	4
WC	(United Kingdom) Lisa Whybourn	6	6
WC	(United Kingdom) Naomi Cavaday	1	2
22	(Czech Republic) Andrea Hlaváčková	6	6

Qualifying competition
WC	(United Kingdom) Lisa Whybourn	1	2
22	(Czech Republic) Andrea Hlaváčková	6	6

=== Twelfth qualifier ===
First round
12	(Slovenia) Maša Zec Peškirič	7	6
(Colombia) Catalina Castaño	5	2
(Greece) Eleni Daniilidou	7^{7}	6
(Canada) Heidi El Tabakh	6^{3}	3
(Argentina) María Irigoyen	3	6	4
(China) Zhou Yimiao	6	2	1^{r}
(Spain) Sílvia Soler Espinosa	1	3
16	(Russia) Anastasia Pivovarova	6	6

Second round
12	(Slovenia) Maša Zec Peškirič	2	2
(Greece) Eleni Daniilidou	6	6
(Argentina) María Irigoyen	2	4
16	(Russia) Anastasia Pivovarova	6	6

Qualifying competition
(Greece) Eleni Daniilidou	6	6
16	(Russia) Anastasia Pivovarova	0	0
