= 2010 Wimbledon Championships =

- Date: 21 June – 4 July
- Edition: 124th
- Category: Grand Slam (ITF)
- Draw: 128S / 64D / 48XD
- Prize money: £13,725,000
- Surface: Grass
- Location: Church Road; SW19, Wimbledon, London, United Kingdom
- Venue: All England Lawn Tennis and Croquet Club
- Attendance: 489,946

Champions

Men's singles
- (Spain) Rafael Nadal

Women's singles
- (United States) Serena Williams

Men's doubles
- (Austria) Jürgen Melzer / (Germany) Philipp Petzschner

Women's doubles
- (United States) Vania King / (Kazakhstan) Yaroslava Shvedova

Mixed doubles
- (India) Leander Paes / (Zimbabwe) Cara Black

Wheelchair men's doubles
- (Netherlands) Robin Ammerlaan / (Sweden) Stefan Olsson

Wheelchair women's doubles
- (Netherlands) Esther Vergeer / (Netherlands) Sharon Walraven

Boys' singles
- (Hungary) Márton Fucsovics

Girls' singles
- (Czech Republic) Kristýna Plíšková

Boys' doubles
- (United Kingdom) Liam Broady / (United Kingdom) Tom Farquharson

Girls' doubles
- (Hungary) Tímea Babos / (United States) Sloane Stephens

Gentlemen's invitation doubles
- (United States) Donald Johnson / (United States) Jared Palmer

Ladies' invitation doubles
- (United States) Martina Navratilova / (Czech Republic) Helena Suková

Senior gentlemen's invitation doubles
- (Australia) Pat Cash / (Australia) Mark Woodforde
- Wimbledon Championships

The 2010 Wimbledon Championships was a tennis tournament played on grass courts at the All England Lawn Tennis and Croquet Club in Wimbledon, London in the United Kingdom. It was the 124th edition of the Wimbledon Championships and were held from 21 June to 4 July 2010. It was the third Grand Slam tennis event of the year. The Queen of the United Kingdom, Elizabeth II attended on Thursday 24 June 2010, for the first time in more than 30 years.

Roger Federer was the defending men's champion and first seed (was actually ranked 2nd), but he was defeated in the quarterfinals by Tomáš Berdych. Berdych also defeated third seed Novak Djokovic in the semi-finals, but was defeated in straight sets by Rafael Nadal in the final. Nadal won his second Wimbledon title, having previously won the 2008 title. Serena Williams successfully defended the women's crown, defeating Vera Zvonareva in the final to win her fourth Wimbledon title.

== Point and prize money distribution ==
=== Point distribution ===
Below are the tables with the point distribution for each discipline of the tournament.

Event	W	F	SF	QF	Round of 16	Round of 32	Round of 64	Round of 128	Q	Q3	Q2	Q1
Men's singles	2000	1200	720	360	180	90	45	10	25	16	8	0
Men's doubles	2000	1200	720	360	180	90	0	—N/a	0	—N/a	0	0
Women's singles	2000	1400	900	500	280	160	100	5	60	50	40	2
Women's doubles	2000	1400	900	500	280	160	5	—N/a	0	—N/a	0	0

=== Prize money ===
The total prize money for 2010 championships was £13,725. The winner of the men's and women's singles title earned £1,000,000.

Event	W	F	SF	QF	Round of 16	Round of 32	Round of 64	Round of 128	Q3	Q2	Q1
Singles	£1,000,000	£500,000	£250,000	£125,000	£62,500	£31,250	£18,750	£11,250	£7,000	£3,500	£1,750
Doubles*	£240,000	£120,000	£60,000	£30,000	£16,000	£9,000	£5,250	—N/a	—N/a	—N/a	—N/a
Mixed doubles*	£92,000	£46,000	£23,000	£10,500	£5,200	£2,600	£1,300	—N/a	—N/a	—N/a	—N/a
Wheelchair doubles*	£7,000	£4,000	£2,250	£1,250	—N/a	—N/a	—N/a	—N/a	—N/a	—N/a	—N/a
Invitation doubles	£17,500	£14,500	£11,500	£10,500	£9,500	—N/a	—N/a	—N/a	—N/a	—N/a	—N/a

_{* per team}

== Champions ==
=== Seniors ===
==== Men's singles ====
(Spain) Rafael Nadal def. (Czech Republic) Tomáš Berdych, 6–3, 7–5, 6–4

- It was Nadal's fifth title of the year and 41st of his career. It was his 8th Grand Slam title and second at Wimbledon, also winning in 2008.

==== Women's singles ====
(United States) Serena Williams def. (Russia) Vera Zvonareva, 6–3, 6–2

- This was Williams' second title of the year and 37th of her career. The title was Williams' 4th Wimbledon title and 13th major victory which ranked her 6th all-time.

==== Men's doubles ====
(Austria) Jürgen Melzer / (Germany) Philipp Petzschner def. (Sweden) Robert Lindstedt / (Romania) Horia Tecău, 6–1, 7–5, 7–5

- It was the first title for both Melzer and Petzschner.

==== Women's doubles ====
(United States) Vania King / (Kazakhstan) Yaroslava Shvedova def. (Russia) Elena Vesnina / (Russia) Vera Zvonareva, 7–6^{(8–6)}, 6–2

- It was King and Shvedova's third tournament as a team, and their first title together.

==== Mixed doubles ====
(India) Leander Paes / (Zimbabwe) Cara Black def. (South Africa) Wesley Moodie / (United States) Lisa Raymond, 6–4, 7–6^{(7–5)}

=== Juniors ===
==== Boys' singles ====
(Hungary) Márton Fucsovics def. (Australia) Benjamin Mitchell, 6–4, 6–4

==== Girls' singles ====
(Czech Republic) Kristýna Plíšková def. (Japan) Sachie Ishizu, 6–3, 4–6, 6–4

==== Boys' doubles ====
(United Kingdom) Liam Broady / (United Kingdom) Tom Farquharson def. (United Kingdom) Lewis Burton / (United Kingdom) George Morgan, 7–6^{(7–4)}, 6–4

==== Girls' doubles ====
(Hungary) Tímea Babos / (United States) Sloane Stephens def. (Russia) Irina Khromacheva / (Ukraine) Elina Svitolina, 6–7^{(7–9)}, 6–2, 6–2

=== Invitation ===
==== Gentlemen's invitation doubles ====
(United States) Donald Johnson / (United States) Jared Palmer def. (South Africa) Wayne Ferreira / (Russia) Yevgeny Kafelnikov, 6–3, 6–2

==== Ladies' invitation doubles ====
(United States) Martina Navratilova / (Czech Republic) Jana Novotná def. (United States) Tracy Austin / (United States) Kathy Rinaldi, 7–5, 6–0

==== Senior gentlemen's invitation doubles ====
(Australia) Pat Cash / (Australia) Mark Woodforde def. (United Kingdom) Jeremy Bates / (Sweden) Anders Järryd, 6–2, 7–6^{(7–5)}

=== Wheelchair events ===
==== Wheelchair men's doubles ====
(Netherlands) Robin Ammerlaan / (Sweden) Stefan Olsson def. (France) Stéphane Houdet / (Japan) Shingo Kunieda, 6–4, 7–6^{(7–4)}

==== Wheelchair women's doubles ====
(Netherlands) Esther Vergeer / (Netherlands) Sharon Walraven def. (Australia) Daniela Di Toro / (United Kingdom) Lucy Shuker, 6–2, 6–3

== Events ==
=== Isner–Mahut match ===
In a record-setting match spanning three days, 23rd seed John Isner, attempting to win his first ever match at Wimbledon, faced off against qualifier Nicolas Mahut in the first round, between 22 and 24 June. With the score at 6–4, 3–6, 6–7(7), 7–6(3), 59–59, the match was suspended due to failing daylight for the second straight day, after a total of 9 hours and 58 minutes of play. Isner had already served a world record 98 aces by that time, with Mahut scoring 94 aces, both breaking Ivo Karlović's previous record of 78. The second day's play alone totalled 7 hours and 8 minutes, more than the longest previous complete match, therefore also making it the longest session of tennis ever played in a single day. Isner eventually defeated Mahut 6–4, 3–6, 6–7(7), 7–6(3), 70–68. The match lasted 11 hours and 5 minutes in total, and the fifth set alone lasted 8 hours and 11 minutes.

The match has been noted as officially the longest ever in a tennis Open in terms of both times and games, beating the previous records set (respectively) by the match between Frenchmen Fabrice Santoro and Arnaud Clément at the 2004 French Open, which lasted for 6 hours and 33 minutes, and the first round match at Wimbledon in 1969 where Pancho Gonzales defeated Charlie Pasarell in 112 games (before the introduction of the tie-break). Time magazine named the Isner–Mahut match one of the Top 10 Sports Moments of 2010.

=== Queen visits Wimbledon ===
Queen Elizabeth II visited Wimbledon on Thursday 24 June, her first visit to the annual tennis tournament in 33 years. The last time the Queen had attended the championships was in 1977, when she watched British player Virginia Wade win the ladies' singles title. Arriving shortly after 11 am, the Queen's visit included a tour of the grounds and an observation session of the All England Club's Wimbledon Junior Tennis Initiative on Court 14, before moving to the Members' Lawn where she greeted a line-up of players: the defending champions in singles Serena Williams and Roger Federer, multiple-time Wimbledon champions Martina Navratilova, Billie Jean King and Venus Williams, and a selection of top professionals: Caroline Wozniacki, Jelena Janković, Novak Djokovic and Andy Roddick. She also met four British women's tennis players: Heather Watson, Elena Baltacha, Anne Keothavong and Laura Robson. Following that, she walked across the bridge to Centre Court, where she later had lunch in the Clubhouse with a selection of former and current tennis players.

The Queen finished her visit by watching Britain's fourth seed Andy Murray play Jarkko Nieminen on Centre Court, from the Royal Box. Before and after the match, Murray and Nieminen bowed to the Royal Box, a tradition that had previously not been in use since 2003.

=== Records ===
In addition to all the records set during the match between John Isner and Nicolas Mahut, the following records were also established at the 2010 championships:

- Novak Djokovic's first-round match against Olivier Rochus was the latest-ever finish at Wimbledon, ending at 22:58, two minutes before the 23:00 curfew. Djokovic won the match 4–6, 6–2, 3–6, 6–4, 6–2.
- In a second-round match against Djokovic, Taylor Dent broke the serve speed record at Wimbledon, at 148 mph (beating the record set by Andy Roddick at 146 mph in 2009). Djokovic won the match 7–6^{(7–5)}, 6–1, 6–4.
- Serena Williams recorded the most aces served by a female at a Grand Slam, with 89 aces.

== Singles players ==
Gentlemen's singles

Champion		Runner-up	
(Spain) Rafael Nadal [2]		(Czech Republic) Tomáš Berdych [12]	
Semi-finals out
(Serbia) Novak Djokovic [3]		(United Kingdom) Andy Murray [4]	
Quarter-finals out
(Switzerland) Roger Federer [1]	(Chinese Taipei) Lu Yen-hsun	(France) Jo-Wilfried Tsonga [10]	(Sweden) Robin Söderling [6]
4th round out
(Austria) Jürgen Melzer [16]	(Germany) Daniel Brands	(Australia) Lleyton Hewitt [15]	(United States) Andy Roddick [5]
(France) Julien Benneteau [32]	(United States) Sam Querrey [18]	(Spain) David Ferrer [9]	(France) Paul-Henri Mathieu
3rd round out
(France) Arnaud Clément	(Spain) Feliciano López [22]	(Uzbekistan) Denis Istomin	(Romania) Victor Hănescu [31]
(Spain) Albert Montañés [28]	(France) Gaël Monfils [21]	(Germany) Florian Mayer	(Germany) Philipp Kohlschreiber [29]
(Italy) Fabio Fognini	(Germany) Tobias Kamke (Q)	(Belgium) Xavier Malisse	(France) Gilles Simon [26]
(Brazil) Thomaz Bellucci [25]	(France) Jérémy Chardy	(Netherlands) Thiemo de Bakker	(Germany) Philipp Petzschner [33]
2nd round out
(Serbia) Ilija Bozoljac (Q)	(Australia) Peter Luczak	(Lithuania) Ričardas Berankis	(Serbia) Viktor Troicki
(Germany) Benjamin Becker	(Germany) Rainer Schüttler	(Turkey) Marsel İlhan (Q)	(Russia) Nikolay Davydenko [7]
(United States) Taylor Dent (Q)	(United States) Brendan Evans (Q)	(Slovakia) Karol Beck	(Kazakhstan) Evgeny Korolev
(United States) Mardy Fish	(Poland) Michał Przysiężny	(Russia) Teymuraz Gabashvili (WC)	(France) Michaël Llodra
(United States) Michael Russell	(Germany) Andreas Beck	(Italy) Andreas Seppi	(Ukraine) Alexandr Dolgopolov
(Germany) Julian Reister (LL)	(Croatia) Ivan Dodig (Q)	(Ukraine) Illya Marchenko	(Finland) Jarkko Nieminen
(Spain) Marcel Granollers	(Austria) Martin Fischer (Q)	(Slovakia) Lukáš Lacko	(France) Florent Serra
(Russia) Mikhail Youzhny [13]	(United States) John Isner [23]	(Poland) Łukasz Kubot	(Netherlands) Robin Haase (PR)
1st round out
(Colombia) Alejandro Falla	(Chile) Nicolás Massú	(Serbia) Janko Tipsarević	(Spain) Tommy Robredo [30]
(United States) Jesse Levine (LL)	(Australia) Carsten Ball (Q)	(Russia) Igor Kunitsyn	(Jamaica) Dustin Brown
(Kazakhstan) Andrey Golubev	(United States) Ryan Sweeting (LL)	(Russia) Dmitry Tursunov (PR)	(Switzerland) Stan Wawrinka [22]
(Russia) Andrey Kuznetsov (WC)	(Brazil) Marcos Daniel	(Russia) Igor Andreev	(South Africa) Kevin Anderson
(Belgium) Olivier Rochus	(Argentina) Juan Ignacio Chela	(Netherlands) Jesse Huta Galung (Q)	(Italy) Paolo Lorenzi
(Argentina) Leonardo Mayer	(Spain) Santiago Ventura Bertomeu (LL)	(Argentina) Eduardo Schwank	(Argentina) Máximo González (PR)
(Croatia) Marin Čilić [11]	(Australia) Bernard Tomic (Q)	(Argentina) Horacio Zeballos	(Croatia) Ivan Ljubičić [17]
(Italy) Potito Starace	(Paraguay) Ramón Delgado (LL)	(United States) Jesse Witten (Q)	(United States) Rajeev Ram
(Spain) Fernando Verdasco [8]	(Spain) Pere Riba	(United Kingdom) Jamie Baker (WC)	(Belgium) Kristof Vliegen (PR)
(Spain) Nicolás Almagro [19]	(Spain) Guillermo García López	(Switzerland) Marco Chiudinelli	(United States) Robert Kendrick (Q)
(Spain) Juan Carlos Ferrero [14]	(South Africa) Rik de Voest (Q)	(Spain) Óscar Hernández	(Ukraine) Sergiy Stakhovsky
(Spain) Guillermo Alcaide (Q)	(Germany) Michael Berrer	(Austria) Stefan Koubek (LL)	(Czech Republic) Jan Hájek
(United States) Robby Ginepri	(Portugal) Frederico Gil	(Japan) Go Soeda (LL)	(Brazil) Ricardo Mello
(Cyprus) Marcos Baghdatis [24]	(Spain) Daniel Gimeno Traver	(Germany) Simon Greul	(Germany) Nicolas Kiefer (WC)
(Israel) Dudi Sela	(France) Marc Gicquel	(Colombia) Santiago Giraldo	(France) Nicolas Mahut (Q)
(France) Stéphane Robert	(Slovenia) Blaž Kavčič	(United States) James Blake	(Japan) Kei Nishikori (WC)

Ladies' singles

Champion		Runner-up	
(United States) Serena Williams [1]		(Russia) Vera Zvonareva [21]	
Semi-finals out
(Czech Republic) Petra Kvitová		(Bulgaria) Tsvetana Pironkova	
Quarter-finals out
(China) Li Na [9]	(Estonia) Kaia Kanepi (Q)	(Belgium) Kim Clijsters [8]	(United States) Venus Williams [2]
4th round out
(Russia) Maria Sharapova [16]	(Poland) Agnieszka Radwańska [7]	(Denmark) Caroline Wozniacki [3]	(Czech Republic) Klára Zakopalová
(Belgium) Justine Henin [17]	(Serbia) Jelena Janković [4]	(France) Marion Bartoli [11]	(Australia) Jarmila Groth
3rd round out
(Slovakia) Dominika Cibulková	(Czech Republic) Barbora Záhlavová-Strýcová	(Australia) Anastasia Rodionova	(Italy) Sara Errani [32]
(Russia) Anastasia Pavlyuchenkova [29]	(Belarus) Victoria Azarenka [14]	(Italy) Flavia Pennetta [10]	(Romania) Alexandra Dulgheru [31]
(Russia) Maria Kirilenko [27]	(Russia) Nadia Petrova [12]	(Belgium) Yanina Wickmayer [15]	(Ukraine) Alona Bondarenko [28]
(Russia) Regina Kulikova	(Hungary) Gréta Arn (Q)	(Germany) Angelique Kerber	(Russia) Alisa Kleybanova [26]
2nd round out
(Russia) Anna Chakvetadze	(Japan) Ayumi Morita	(Slovakia) Daniela Hantuchová [24]	(Romania) Raluca Olaru
(Japan) Kurumi Nara (Q)	(Russia) Svetlana Kuznetsova [19]	(Spain) Arantxa Parra Santonja	(Italy) Alberta Brianti
(Chinese Taipei) Chang Kai-chen	(Italy) Roberta Vinci	(China) Zheng Jie [23]	(Serbia) Bojana Jovanovski
(Romania) Monica Niculescu	(France) Aravane Rezaï [18]	(Italy) Romina Oprandi	(Romania) Edina Gallovits
(Croatia) Karolina Šprem	(United States) Shenay Perry (Q)	(Germany) Kristina Barrois	(Chinese Taipei) Chan Yung-jan
(Belgium) Kirsten Flipkens	(Czech Republic) Andrea Hlaváčková	(United States) Varvara Lepchenko	(Canada) Aleksandra Wozniak
(Russia) Vera Dushevina	(Kazakhstan) Yaroslava Shvedova [30]	(Australia) Alicia Molik	(Croatia) Petra Martić
(Israel) Shahar Pe'er [13]	(United States) Melanie Oudin [33]	(Russia) Alla Kudryavtseva	(Russia) Ekaterina Makarova
1st round out
(Portugal) Michelle Larcher de Brito	(Germany) Andrea Petkovic	(Thailand) Tamarine Tanasugarn	(Czech Republic) Lucie Šafářová [25]
(United States) Vania King	(Russia) Elena Vesnina	(France) Alizé Cornet	(Russia) Anastasia Pivovarova
(South Africa) Chanelle Scheepers (WC)	(Colombia) Mariana Duque Mariño	(United Kingdom) Anne Keothavong	(Uzbekistan) Akgul Amanmuradova
(France) Julie Coin	(Belarus) Olga Govortsova	(United States) Jill Craybas	(Hungary) Melinda Czink
(Italy) Tathiana Garbin	(Netherlands) Arantxa Rus	(Austria) Sybille Bammer	(Czech Republic) Iveta Benešová
(France) Pauline Parmentier	(Romania) Sorana Cîrstea	(Australia) Casey Dellacqua (PR)	(Croatia) Mirjana Lučić (Q)
(Spain) Anabel Medina Garrigues	(Argentina) Gisela Dulko	(Austria) Yvonne Meusburger	(Slovakia) Magdaléna Rybáriková
(Japan) Kimiko Date-Krumm	(United Kingdom) Heather Watson (WC)	(Switzerland) Timea Bacsinszky	(Australia) Samantha Stosur [6]
(Italy) Maria Elena Camerin	(United States) Bethanie Mattek-Sands (Q)	(Belarus) Anastasiya Yakimova (Q)	(Switzerland) Stefanie Vögele
(Latvia) Anastasija Sevastova	(Ukraine) Mariya Koryttseva	(Switzerland) Patty Schnyder	(Germany) Tatjana Malek
(United States) Alison Riske (WC)	(Canada) Stéphanie Dubois (LL)	(Thailand) Noppawan Lertcheewakarn (WC)	(Spain) Nuria Llagostera Vives (Q)
(United Kingdom) Katie O'Brien	(Czech Republic) Lucie Hradecká	(Greece) Eleni Daniilidou (Q)	(United Kingdom) Laura Robson (WC)
(Italy) Francesca Schiavone [5]	(Russia) Anna Lapushchenkova	(United Kingdom) Melanie South (WC)	(Slovenia) Polona Hercog
(Ukraine) Kateryna Bondarenko [34]	(Slovakia) Zuzana Kučová	(United Kingdom) Elena Baltacha	(Germany) Julia Görges
(Serbia) Ana Ivanovic	(India) Sania Mirza	(Czech Republic) Renata Voráčová	(Germany) Anna-Lena Grönefeld
(Czech Republic) Sandra Záhlavová	(Sweden) Sofia Arvidsson	(Hungary) Ágnes Szávay	(Paraguay) Rossana de los Ríos

== Singles seeds ==
The following are the seeded players and notable players who withdrew from the event. Seedings based on ATP and WTA rankings as of 14 June 2010. Rankings and points before are as of 21 June 2010.

=== Men's singles ===
The Men's singles seeds is arranged on a surface-based system to reflect more accurately the individual player's grass court achievement as per the following formula:

- ESP points as at a week before The Championships
- Add 100% points earned for all grass court tournaments in the past 12 months
- add 75% points earned for best grass court tournament in the 12 months before that.

Seed	Rank	Player	Points before	Points defending	Points won	Points after	Status
1	2	(Switzerland) Roger Federer	8,525	2,000	360	6,885	Quarter-finals lost to (Czech Republic) Tomáš Berdych [12]
2	1	(Spain) Rafael Nadal	8,745	0	2,000	10,745	Champion, defeated (Czech Republic) Tomáš Berdych [12]
3	3	(Serbia) Novak Djokovic	6,545	360	720	6,905	Semi-finals lost to (Czech Republic) Tomáš Berdych [12]
4	4	(United Kingdom) Andy Murray	5,155	720	720	5,155	Semi-finals lost to (Spain) Rafael Nadal [2]
5	7	(United States) Andy Roddick	4,510	1200	180	3,490	Fourth round lost to (Chinese Taipei) Lu Yen-hsun
6	6	(Sweden) Robin Söderling	4,755	180	360	4,935	Quarter-finals lost to (Spain) Rafael Nadal [2]
7	5	(Russia) Nikolay Davydenko	4,785	90	45	4,740	Second round lost to (Germany) Daniel Brands
8	9	(Spain) Fernando Verdasco	3,645	180	10	3,475	First round lost to (Italy) Fabio Fognini
9	11	(Spain) David Ferrer	3,010	90	180	3,100	Fourth round lost to (Sweden) Robin Söderling [6]
10	10	(France) Jo-Wilfried Tsonga	3,185	90	360	3,455	Quarter-finals lost to (United Kingdom) Andy Murray [4]
11	12	(Croatia) Marin Čilić	2,945	90	10	2,865	First round lost to (Germany) Florian Mayer
12	13	(Czech Republic) Tomáš Berdych	2,825	180	1200	3,845	Runner-up, lost to (Spain) Rafael Nadal [2]
13	14	(Russia) Mikhail Youzhny	2,665	10	45	2,700	Second round lost to (France) Paul-Henri Mathieu
14	17	(Spain) Juan Carlos Ferrero	2,095	360	10	1,745	First round lost to (Belgium) Xavier Malisse
15	26	(Australia) Lleyton Hewitt	1,565	360	180	1,385	Fourth round lost to (Serbia) Novak Djokovic [3]
16	16	(Austria) Jürgen Melzer	2,125	90	180	2,215	Fourth round lost to (Switzerland) Roger Federer [1]
17	15	(Croatia) Ivan Ljubičić	2,190	0	10	2,200	First round lost to (Poland) Michał Przysiężny
18	21	(United States) Sam Querrey	1,755	45	180	1,890	Fourth round lost to (United Kingdom) Andy Murray [4]
19	18	(Spain) Nicolás Almagro	1,960	90	10	1,890	First round lost to (Italy) Andreas Seppi
20	23	(Switzerland) Stan Wawrinka	1,690	180	10	1,520	First round lost to (Uzbekistan) Denis Istomin
21	20	(France) Gaël Monfils	1,905	0	90	1,995	Third round lost to (Australia) Lleyton Hewitt [15]
22	30	(Spain) Feliciano López	1,455	10	90	1,535	Third round lost to (Austria) Jürgen Melzer [16]
23	19	(United States) John Isner	1,925	(45)^{†}	45	1,925	Second round lost to (Netherlands) Thiemo de Bakker
24	27	(Cyprus) Marcos Baghdatis	1,545	0	10	1,555	First round lost to (Slovakia) Lukáš Lacko
25	24	(Brazil) Thomaz Bellucci	1,652	(20)^{†}	90	1,722	Third round lost to (Sweden) Robin Söderling [6]
26	32	(France) Gilles Simon	1,305	180	90	1,215	Third round lost to (United Kingdom) Andy Murray [4]
~~27~~	~~29~~	(Latvia) ~~Ernests Gulbis~~	1,459	45	0	1,414	Withdrew with right thigh muscle tear
28	31	(Spain) Albert Montañés	1,405	90	90	1,405	Third round lost to (Serbia) Novak Djokovic [3]
29	35	(Germany) Philipp Kohlschreiber	1,230	90	90	1,230	Third round lost to (United States) Andy Roddick [5]
30	36	(Spain) Tommy Robredo	1,155	90	10	1,075	First round lost to (Australia) Peter Luczak
31	38	(Romania) Victor Hănescu	1,070	45	90	1,115	Third round retired against (Germany) Daniel Brands
32	40	(France) Julien Benneteau	1,059	10	180	1,229	Fourth round lost to (France) Jo-Wilfried Tsonga [10]
33	41	(Germany) Philipp Petzschner	1,055	90	90	1,055	Third round lost to (Spain) Rafael Nadal [2]

†The player did not qualify for the tournament in 2009. Accordingly, this was the 18th best result deducted instead.

The following players would have been seeded, but they withdrew from the event.

Rank	Player	Points before	Points defending	Points after	Withdrawal reason
8	(Argentina) Juan Martín del Potro	4,395	45	4,350	Right wrist injury
22	(Chile) Fernando González	1,710	90	1,620	Knee injury
25	(Czech Republic) Radek Štěpánek	1,645	180	1,465	Knee injury
28	(Argentina) Juan Mónaco	1,475	10	1,465	Wrist injury
33	(Croatia) Ivo Karlović	1,285	360	925	Foot injury
34	(Germany) Tommy Haas	1,230	720	510	Right hip surgery

=== Women's singles ===
For the Women's singles seeds, the seeding order follows the ranking list, except where in the opinion of the Committee, the grass court credentials of a particular player necessitates a change in the interest of achieving a balanced draw.

Seed	Rank	Player	Points before	Points defending	Points won	Points after	Status
1	1	(United States) Serena Williams	8,475	2,000	2,000	8,475	Champion, defeated (Russia) Vera Zvonareva [21]
2	2	(United States) Venus Williams	6,506	1,400	500	5,606	Quarter-finals lost to (Bulgaria) Tsvetana Pironkova
3	3	(Denmark) Caroline Wozniacki	5,630	280	280	5,630	Fourth round lost to (Czech Republic) Petra Kvitová
4	4	(Serbia) Jelena Janković	5,780	160	280	5,900	Fourth round retired against (Russia) Vera Zvonareva [21]
5	6	(Italy) Francesca Schiavone	4,920	500	5	4,425	First round lost to (Russia) Vera Dushevina
6	7	(Australia) Samantha Stosur	5,045	160	5	4,890	First round lost to (Estonia) Kaia Kanepi [Q]
7	9	(Poland) Agnieszka Radwańska	3,950	500	280	3,730	Fourth round lost to (China) Li Na [9]
8	8	(Belgium) Kim Clijsters	4,010	0	500	4,510	Quarter-finals lost to (Russia) Vera Zvonareva [21]
9	12	(China) Li Na	3,416	160	500	3,756	Quarter-finals lost to (United States) Serena Williams [1]
10	10	(Italy) Flavia Pennetta	3,450	160	160	3,450	Third round lost to (Czech Republic) Klára Zakopalová
11	13	(France) Marion Bartoli	3,246	160	280	3,366	Fourth round lost to (Bulgaria) Tsvetana Pironkova
12	14	(Russia) Nadia Petrova	3,195	280	160	3,075	Third round lost to (Belgium) Justine Henin [17]
13	15	(Israel) Shahar Pe'er	3,175	100	100	3,175	Second round lost to (Germany) Angelique Kerber
14	11	(Belarus) Victoria Azarenka	3,430	500	160	3,090	Third round lost to (Czech Republic) Petra Kvitová
15	18	(Belgium) Yanina Wickmayer	2,980	5	160	3,135	Third round lost to (Russia) Vera Zvonareva [21]
16	17	(Russia) Maria Sharapova	3,080	100	280	3,260	Fourth round lost to (United States) Serena Williams [1]
17	16	(Belgium) Justine Henin	3,135	0	280	3,415	Fourth round lost to (Belgium) Kim Clijsters [8]
18	20	(France) Aravane Rezaï	2,825	100	100	2,825	Second round lost to (Czech Republic) Klára Zakopalová
19	19	(Russia) Svetlana Kuznetsova	2,940	160	100	2,880	Second round lost to (Australia) Anastasia Rodionova
~~20~~	~~22~~	~~(Russia) Dinara Safina~~	2,632	900	0	1,732	Withdrew due to lower back injury
21	21	(Russia) Vera Zvonareva	2,725	160	1,400	3,965	Runner-up, lost to (United States) Serena Williams [1]
~~22~~	~~23~~	~~(Spain) María José Martínez Sánchez~~	2,540	5	0	2,535	Withdrew due to knee injury
23	24	(China) Zheng Jie	2,296	100	100	2,296	Second round lost to (Czech Republic) Petra Kvitová
24	25	(Slovakia) Daniela Hantuchová	2,285	280	100	2,105	Second round lost to (Czech Republic) Barbora Záhlavová-Strýcová
25	26	(Czech Republic) Lucie Šafářová	2,075	5	5	2,075	First round lost to (Slovakia) Dominika Cibulková
26	27	(Russia) Alisa Kleybanova	2,010	100	160	2,070	Third round lost to (United States) Venus Williams [2]
27	28	(Russia) Maria Kirilenko	1,985	100	160	2,045	Third round lost to (Belgium) Kim Clijsters [8]
28	30	(Ukraine) Alona Bondarenko	1,855	5	160	2,010	Third round lost to (Serbia) Jelena Janković [4]
29	32	(Russia) Anastasia Pavlyuchenkova	1,850	100	160	1,910	Third round lost to (Denmark) Caroline Wozniacki [3]
30	29	(Kazakhstan) Yaroslava Shvedova	1,860	100	100	1,860	Second round lost to (Russia) Regina Kulikova
31	31	(Romania) Alexandra Dulgheru	1,855	(30)^{†}	160	1,985	Third round lost to (Estonia) Kaia Kanepi [Q]
32	34	(Italy) Sara Errani	1,660	100	160	1,720	Third round lost to (Poland) Agnieszka Radwańska [7]
33	35	(United States) Melanie Oudin	1,513	340	100	1,273	Second round lost to (Australia) Jarmila Groth
34	36	(Ukraine) Kateryna Bondarenko	1,481	100	5	1,386	First round lost to (Hungary) Gréta Arn [Q]

†The player did not qualify the tournament in 2009. Accordingly, this was the 16th best result deducted instead.

The following player would have been seeded, but she withdrew from the event.

Rank	Player	Points before	Points defending	Points after	Withdrawal reason
5	(Russia) Elena Dementieva	5,570	900	4,670	Torn left calf muscle

== Main draw wild card entries ==
The following players received wild cards into the main draw senior events.

=== Men's singles ===
1. (United Kingdom) Jamie Baker
2. (Russia) Teymuraz Gabashvili
3. (Germany) Nicolas Kiefer
4. (Russia) Andrey Kuznetsov
5. (Japan) Kei Nishikori

=== Women's singles ===
1. (Thailand) Noppawan Lertcheewakarn
2. (United Kingdom) Katie O'Brien
3. (United States) Alison Riske
4. (United Kingdom) Laura Robson
5. (South Africa) Chanelle Scheepers
6. (United Kingdom) Melanie South
7. (United Kingdom) Heather Watson

=== Men's doubles ===
1. (United Kingdom) Alex Bogdanovic / (United Kingdom) Alexander Slabinsky
2. (United Kingdom) Jamie Delgado / (United Kingdom) Josh Goodall
3. (United Kingdom) Chris Eaton / (United Kingdom) Dominic Inglot
4. (United Kingdom) Jonathan Marray / (United Kingdom) Jamie Murray

=== Women's doubles ===
1. (United Kingdom) Naomi Broady / (United Kingdom) Katie O'Brien
2. (United Kingdom) Naomi Cavaday / (United Kingdom) Anna Smith
3. (United Kingdom) Anne Keothavong / (United Kingdom) Melanie South
4. (Australia) Sally Peers / (United Kingdom) Laura Robson

=== Mixed doubles ===
1. (United States) Bob Bryan / (United States) Lindsay Davenport
2. (United Kingdom) Colin Fleming / (United Kingdom) Sarah Borwell
3. (United Kingdom) Ross Hutchins / (United Kingdom) Anne Keothavong
4. (United Kingdom) Jonathan Marray / (United Kingdom) Anna Smith
5. (United Kingdom) Jamie Murray / (United Kingdom) Laura Robson

== Protected ranking ==
The following players were accepted directly into the main draw using a protected ranking:

Men's Singles

- (Russia) Dmitry Tursunov (58)
- (Argentina) Máximo González (66)
- (Belgium) Kristof Vliegen (68)
- (Netherlands) Robin Haase (104)

Women's Singles

- (Australia) Casey Dellacqua (82)

== Qualifiers entries ==
Below are the lists of the qualifiers entering in the main draws.

=== Men's singles ===
Men's singles qualifiers

1. (United States) Taylor Dent
2. (Austria) Martin Fischer
3. (Serbia) Ilija Bozoljac
4. (Australia) Carsten Ball
5. (South Africa) Rik de Voest
6. (Croatia) Ivan Dodig
7. (Spain) Guillermo Alcaide
8. (Australia) Bernard Tomic
9. (Germany) Tobias Kamke
10. (Netherlands) Jesse Huta Galung
11. (Turkey) Marsel İlhan
12. (United States) Robert Kendrick
13. (France) Nicolas Mahut
14. (United States) Brendan Evans
15. (United States) Jesse Witten
16. (Lithuania) Ričardas Berankis

Lucky losers

1. (United States) Jesse Levine
2. (United States) Ryan Sweeting
3. (Austria) Stefan Koubek
4. (Japan) Go Soeda
5. (Germany) Julian Reister
6. (Spain) Santiago Ventura Bertomeu
7. (Paraguay) Ramón Delgado

=== Women's singles ===
Women's singles qualifiers

1. (Estonia) Kaia Kanepi
2. (Spain) Nuria Llagostera Vives
3. (Italy) Romina Oprandi
4. (United States) Bethanie Mattek-Sands
5. (United States) Shenay Perry
6. (Belarus) Anastasiya Yakimova
7. (Hungary) Gréta Arn
8. (Croatia) Mirjana Lučić
9. (Japan) Kurumi Nara
10. (Romania) Monica Niculescu
11. (Czech Republic) Andrea Hlaváčková
12. (Greece) Eleni Daniilidou

Lucky losers

1. (Canada) Stéphanie Dubois
2. (Russia) Anastasia Pivovarova

=== Men's doubles ===
Men's doubles qualifiers

1. (India) Somdev Devvarman / (Philippines) Treat Huey
2. (South Africa) Rik de Voest / (Germany) Mischa Zverev
3. (United States) Jesse Levine / (United States) Ryan Sweeting
4. (Serbia) Ilija Bozoljac / (India) Harsh Mankad

Lucky losers

1. (Poland) Tomasz Bednarek / (Poland) Mateusz Kowalczyk
2. (Thailand) Sanchai Ratiwatana / (Thailand) Sonchat Ratiwatana

=== Women's doubles ===
Women's doubles qualifiers

1. (Ukraine) Mariya Koryttseva / (Belarus) Darya Kustova
2. (Greece) Eleni Daniilidou / (Germany) Jasmin Wöhr
3. (Estonia) Kaia Kanepi / (China) Zhang Shuai
4. (United States) Jill Craybas / (New Zealand) Marina Erakovic

Lucky losers

1. (Hungary) Katalin Marosi / (Germany) Kathrin Wörle
2. (Chinese Taipei) Chang Kai-chen / (Japan) Ayumi Morita

== Withdrawals ==
The following players were accepted directly into the main tournament, but withdrew with injuries or personal reasons.

Men's singles

- ‡ (Argentina) Juan Martín del Potro (5) → replaced by (United States) Robby Ginepri (100)
- ‡ (Germany) Tommy Haas (20) → replaced by (Jamaica) Dustin Brown (101)
- ‡ (Chile) Fernando González (14) → replaced by (Portugal) Frederico Gil (102)
- ‡ (Argentina) Juan Mónaco (27) → replaced by (Spain) Óscar Hernández (103)
- † (Croatia) Ivo Karlović (36) → replaced by (Austria) Stefan Koubek (LL)
- † (Uruguay) Pablo Cuevas (50) → replaced by (United States) Jesse Levine (LL)
- † (Argentina) David Nalbandian (15 PR) → replaced by (Paraguay) Ramón Delgado (LL)
- † (Croatia) Mario Ančić (65 PR) → replaced by (Germany) Julian Reister (LL)
- † (Czech Republic) Radek Štěpánek (21) → replaced by (Japan) Go Soeda (LL)
- † (France) Richard Gasquet (82) → replaced by (United States) Ryan Sweeting (LL)
- § (Latvia) Ernests Gulbis (34) → replaced by (Spain) Santiago Ventura Bertomeu (LL)

Women's singles

- ‡ (China) Peng Shuai (50) → replaced by (Croatia) Karolina Šprem (108)
- ‡ (Spain) Carla Suárez Navarro (40) → replaced by (Australia) Jarmila Groth (109)
- ‡ (Germany) Sabine Lisicki (49) → replaced by (United States) Varvara Lepchenko (110)
- ‡ (France) Virginie Razzano (47) → replaced by (Portugal) Michelle Larcher de Brito (112)
- ‡ (Russia) Elena Dementieva (6) → replaced by (Italy) Maria Elena Camerin (114)
- § (Spain) María José Martínez Sánchez (19) → replaced by (Russia) Anastasia Pivovarova (LL)
- § (Russia) Dinara Safina (5) → replaced by (Canada) Stéphanie Dubois (LL)

‡ – withdrew from entry list before qualifying began
† – withdrew from entry list after qualifying began
§ – withdrew from main draw

== Media coverage ==
These are the Wimbledon television broadcasters:

- Asia: Star Sports, Star Cricket (Star Sports were also showing 2010 FIFA World Cup matches, so Star Cricket showed some Live Wimbledon coverage)
- Europe:
  - Albania: Supersport, M Ryci Ltd
  - Austria: ORF
  - Belgium: RTBF, VRT
  - Bosnia and Herzegovina: Sport Klub, BHRT
  - Bulgaria: Diema Vision Plc, TV Sedem JSC, TV7
  - Croatia: HRT
  - Czech Republic: Nova Sport
  - Denmark: TV2 Sport
  - France: Canal+
  - Germany: Sky, SPORT1
  - Greece: Nova Sports
  - Hungary: Sport 1, Sport 2
  - (Republic of Ireland) Ireland: TG4
  - Italy: Sky Sport Italy
  - Kosovo:Kohavision
  - Lithuania: Sport 1
  - (North Macedonia) Macedonia: Sport Klub
  - Malta: Go Multiplus
  - Montenegro: Sport Klub, TV In, B92
  - Netherlands: NOS, SBS, Sport 1, Utd Football Broadcasting
  - Norway: Canal+
  - Poland: Polsat
  - Portugal: Sport TV
  - Romania: MPI / Sport Radio TV, Sport.ro
  - Russia: NTV Plus
  - Serbia: Sport Klub, B92
  - Slovakia: Nova Sport
  - Slovenia: Sport Klub
  - Spain: Canal+
  - Sweden: TV4
  - Switzerland: SRG-SSR, SSR TV
  - Turkey: NTV Spor
  - United Kingdom: BBC
- Israel: Sport 5, Sport 5+, 5+ Live, Sport 5 HD
- United States: NBC, ESPN, Tennis Channel, DirecTV Experience
- Canada: RDS, TSN, Global
- Brazil: SporTV
- Australia: Nine Network, Fox Sports
- Hong Kong: ATV
- Japan: Wowow, NHK, Gaora
- Malaysia: Star Sports
- Venezuela: Meridiano
- Nigeria: NRK
- Middle East: Jsc Sports
- New Zealand: Sky Sport, TVNZ
- South Africa: Supersport
- Fiji: Fiji TV

Preceded by 2010 French Open	Grand Slams	Succeeded by 2010 US Open
