= 2010 Wimbledon Championships – Women's doubles =

Women's doubles
- 2010 Wimbledon Championships

Final
- Champions: (United States) Vania King (Kazakhstan) Yaroslava Shvedova
- Runners-up: (Russia) Elena Vesnina (Russia) Vera Zvonareva
- Score: 7–6^{(8–6)}, 6–2

Details
- Draw: 64 (4Q / 5WC)
- Seeds: 16

Events
Singles	men	women		boys	girls
Doubles	men	women	mixed	boys	girls
WC Singles	men	women	quad
WC Doubles	men	women	quad
Legends	men	women	seniors
- Wimbledon Championships

Vania King and Yaroslava Shvedova defeated Elena Vesnina and Vera Zvonareva in the final, 7–6^{(8–6)}, 6–2 to win the ladies' doubles tennis title at the 2010 Wimbledon Championships.

Serena and Venus Williams were the two-time defending champions, but lost in the quarterfinals to Vesnina and Zvonareva.

== Seeds ==
1. (United States) Serena Williams / (United States) Venus Williams (quarterfinals)
2. (Spain) Nuria Llagostera Vives / (Spain) María José Martínez Sánchez (withdrew)
3. (Russia) Nadia Petrova / (Australia) Samantha Stosur (third round)
4. (Argentina) Gisela Dulko / (Italy) Flavia Pennetta (semifinals)
5. (United States) Liezel Huber / (United States) Bethanie Mattek-Sands (semifinals)
6. (Czech Republic) Květa Peschke / (Slovenia) Katarina Srebotnik (quarterfinals)
7. (United States) Lisa Raymond / (Australia) Rennae Stubbs (quarterfinals)
8. (Russia) Alisa Kleybanova / (Italy) Francesca Schiavone (withdrew)
9. (Chinese Taipei) Chan Yung-jan / (China) Zheng Jie (first round)
10. (Russia) Maria Kirilenko / (Poland) Agnieszka Radwańska (second round)
11. (Zimbabwe) Cara Black / (Slovakia) Daniela Hantuchová (third round)
12. (Czech Republic) Iveta Benešová / (Czech Republic) Barbora Záhlavová-Strýcová (third round)
13. (Russia) Vera Dushevina / (Russia) Ekaterina Makarova (second round)
14. (Romania) Monica Niculescu / (Israel) Shahar Pe'er (second round)
15. (Poland) Alicja Rosolska / (China) Yan Zi (second round)
16. (Chinese Taipei) Hsieh Su-wei / (Russia) Alla Kudryavtseva (third round)
17. (Chinese Taipei) Chuang Chia-jung / (Belarus) Olga Govortsova (second round)

Click on the seed number of a player to go to their draw section.

== Draw ==
Key

- Q = Qualifier
- WC = Wild card
- LL = Lucky loser
- Alt = Alternate
- ITF = ITF entry
- PR = Protected ranking
- SR = Special ranking
- SE = Special exempt
- JE = Junior exempt
- JR = Junior Accelerator Programme entrant
- CO = College Accelerator Programme entrant
- NG = Next Gen Accelerator Program entrant
- w/o = Walkover
- r = Retired
- d = Defaulted

=== Finals ===
Quarterfinals
1	(United States) Serena Williams (United States) Venus Williams	6	3	4
(Russia) Elena Vesnina (Russia) Vera Zvonareva	3	6	6
4	(Argentina) Gisela Dulko (Italy) Flavia Pennetta	6	6
(Germany) Julia Görges (Hungary) Ágnes Szávay	2	2
6	(Czech Republic) Květa Peschke (Slovenia) Katarina Srebotnik	6	5	3
(United States) Vania King (Kazakhstan) Yaroslava Shvedova	3	7	6
7	(United States) Lisa Raymond (Australia) Rennae Stubbs	4	3
5	(United States) Liezel Huber (United States) Bethanie Mattek-Sands	6	6

Semifinals
(Russia) Elena Vesnina (Russia) Vera Zvonareva	6	6
4	(Argentina) Gisela Dulko (Italy) Flavia Pennetta	3	1
(United States) Vania King (Kazakhstan) Yaroslava Shvedova	6	6
5	(United States) Liezel Huber (United States) Bethanie Mattek-Sands	4	2

Final
(Russia) Elena Vesnina (Russia) Vera Zvonareva	6^{6}	2
(United States) Vania King (Kazakhstan) Yaroslava Shvedova	7^{8}	6

=== Top half ===
==== Section 1 ====
First round
1	(United States) S Williams (United States) V Williams	6	6
(United States) J Ditty (Czech Republic) R Voráčová	4	2
(Germany) T Malek (Germany) A Petkovic	4	4
(Switzerland) T Bacsinszky (Italy) T Garbin	6	6
(Slovakia) D Cibulková (Russia) A Pavlyuchenkova	4	6	6
(Romania) E Gallovits (Poland) K Jans	6	2	4
(France) J Coin (Canada) M-È Pelletier	3	2
15	(Poland) A Rosolska (China) Z Yan	6	6
12	(Czech Republic) I Benešová (Czech Republic) B Záhlavová-Strýcová	6	5	6
Q	(Greece) E Daniilidou (Germany) J Wöhr	2	7	3
WC	(United Kingdom) N Broady (United Kingdom) K O'Brien	2	3
(Czech Republic) A Hlaváčková (Czech Republic) L Hradecká	6	6
(Russia) E Vesnina (Russia) V Zvonareva	7	6
Q	(Ukraine) M Koryttseva (Belarus) D Kustova	5	4
(Belarus) V Azarenka (Russia) A Chakvetadze	6	6^{2}	2
17	(Chinese Taipei) C-j Chuang (Belarus) O Govortsova	3	7^{7}	6

Second round
1	(United States) S Williams (United States) V Williams	6	7^{7}
(Switzerland) T Bacsinszky (Italy) T Garbin	1	6^{2}
(Slovakia) D Cibulková (Russia) A Pavlyuchenkova	7	6
15	(Poland) A Rosolska (China) Z Yan	5	1
12	(Czech Republic) I Benešová (Czech Republic) B Záhlavová-Strýcová	6	6
(Czech Republic) A Hlaváčková (Czech Republic) L Hradecká	3	3
(Russia) E Vesnina (Russia) V Zvonareva	6	5	7
17	(Chinese Taipei) C-j Chuang (Belarus) O Govortsova	4	7	5

Third round
1	(United States) S Williams (United States) V Williams	6	6
(Slovakia) D Cibulková (Russia) A Pavlyuchenkova	1	2
12	(Czech Republic) I Benešová (Czech Republic) B Záhlavová-Strýcová	3	2
(Russia) E Vesnina (Russia) V Zvonareva	6	6

Quarterfinals
1	(United States) S Williams (United States) V Williams	6	3	4
(Russia) E Vesnina (Russia) V Zvonareva	3	6	6

==== Section 2 ====
First round
4	(Argentina) G Dulko (Italy) F Pennetta	6	4	6
(Australia) An Rodionova (Russia) Ar Rodionova	2	6	1
(Russia) R Kulikova (Latvia) A Sevastova	3	3
(United Kingdom) E Baltacha (Ukraine) O Savchuk	6	6
(Spain) A Medina Garrigues (Turkey) İ Şenoğlu	4	2
(Serbia) J Janković (South Africa) C Scheepers	6	6
(Belgium) K Flipkens (Belgium) Y Wickmayer	6^{4}	3
13	(Russia) V Dushevina (Russia) E Makarova	7^{7}	6
9	(Chinese Taipei) Y-j Chan (China) J Zheng	3	6	4
(Uzbekistan) A Amanmuradova (Germany) K Barrois	6	2	6
(Slovakia) M Rybáriková (Czech Republic) K Zakopalová	6	7^{7}
(Hungary) M Czink (Spain) A Parra Santonja	3	6^{3}
(Germany) J Görges (Hungary) Á Szávay	4	6	6
WC	(United Kingdom) N Cavaday (United Kingdom) A Smith	6	4	1
(Japan) K Date-Krumm (Thailand) T Tanasugarn	3	6^{4}
LL	(Chinese Taipei) K-c Chang (Japan) A Morita	6	7^{7}

Second round
4	(Argentina) G Dulko (Italy) F Pennetta	6^{2}	6	6
(United Kingdom) E Baltacha (Ukraine) O Savchuk	7^{7}	3	0
(Serbia) J Janković (South Africa) C Scheepers	7^{7}	6
13	(Russia) V Dushevina (Russia) E Makarova	6^{4}	4
(Uzbekistan) A Amanmuradova (Germany) K Barrois	6	6
(Slovakia) M Rybáriková (Czech Republic) K Zakopalová	4	2
(Germany) J Görges (Hungary) Á Szávay	6	7
LL	(Chinese Taipei) K-c Chang (Japan) A Morita	2	5

Third round
4	(Argentina) G Dulko (Italy) F Pennetta
(Serbia) J Janković (South Africa) C Scheepers	w/o
(Uzbekistan) A Amanmuradova (Germany) K Barrois	2	6^{7}
(Germany) J Görges (Hungary) Á Szávay	6	7^{9}

Quarterfinals
4	(Argentina) G Dulko (Italy) F Pennetta	6	6
(Germany) J Görges (Hungary) Á Szávay	2	2

=== Bottom half ===
==== Section 3 ====
First round
6	(Czech Republic) K Peschke (Slovenia) K Srebotnik	6	7
Q	(United States) J Craybas (New Zealand) M Erakovic	2	5
(Belarus) E Dzehalevich (Belarus) T Poutchek	4	5
(Spain) V Ruano Pascual (United States) M Shaughnessy	6	7
(South Africa) N Grandin (United States) A Spears	3	3
(Italy) S Errani (Italy) R Vinci	6	6
(Sweden) S Arvidsson (Germany) A Kerber	4	5
10	(Russia) M Kirilenko (Poland) A Radwańska	6	7
14	(Romania) M Niculescu (Israel) S Pe'er	6	6
(Ukraine) A Bondarenko (Ukraine) K Bondarenko	2	2
(United States) V King (Kazakhstan) Y Shvedova	6	6
(Italy) A Brianti (Romania) A Dulgheru	1	2
(Russia) S Kuznetsova (France) A Rezaï	6	4	6
(Latvia) L Dekmeijere (Czech Republic) P Kvitová	3	6	2
(United States) M Oudin (United States) R Zalameda	6^{5}	0
3	(Russia) N Petrova (Australia) S Stosur	7^{7}	6

Second round
6	(Czech Republic) K Peschke (Slovenia) K Srebotnik	6	6
(Spain) V Ruano Pascual (United States) M Shaughnessy	3	1
(Italy) S Errani (Italy) R Vinci	6	6
10	(Russia) M Kirilenko (Poland) A Radwańska	4	1
14	(Romania) M Niculescu (Israel) S Pe'er	0	6	2
(United States) V King (Kazakhstan) Y Shvedova	6	3	6
(Russia) S Kuznetsova (France) A Rezaï	0	4
3	(Russia) N Petrova (Australia) S Stosur	6	6

Third round
6	(Czech Republic) K Peschke (Slovenia) K Srebotnik	7	6
(Italy) S Errani (Italy) R Vinci	5	3
(United States) V King (Kazakhstan) Y Shvedova	6	6
3	(Russia) N Petrova (Australia) S Stosur	4	4

Quarterfinals
6	(Czech Republic) K Peschke (Slovenia) K Srebotnik	6	5	3
(United States) V King (Kazakhstan) Y Shvedova	3	7	6

==== Section 4 ====
First round
7	(United States) L Raymond (Australia) R Stubbs	7^{13}	4	6
(Slovenia) P Hercog (Croatia) P Martić	6^{11}	6	4
WC	(United Kingdom) J Rae (United Kingdom) H Watson	3	6	6
(Australia) C Dellacqua (Australia) A Molik	6	1	4
(India) S Mirza (Denmark) C Wozniacki	6	6
WC	(United Kingdom) A Keothavong (United Kingdom) M South	4	1
(Russia) M Kondratieva (Czech Republic) V Uhlířová	2	6	2
11	(Zimbabwe) C Black (Slovakia) D Hantuchová	6	2	6
16	(Chinese Taipei) S-w Hsieh (Russia) A Kudryavtseva	6	6
(Netherlands) M Krajicek (Switzerland) P Schnyder	3	2
WC	(Australia) S Peers (United Kingdom) L Robson	2	4
Q	(Estonia) K Kanepi (China) S Zhang	6	6
(Czech Republic) L Šafářová (Canada) A Wozniak	4	6	6
LL	(Hungary) K Marosi (Germany) K Wörle	6	4	3
(United Kingdom) S Borwell (United States) R Kops-Jones	7^{7}	3	5
5	(United States) L Huber (United States) B Mattek-Sands	6^{1}	6	7

Second round
7	(United States) L Raymond (Australia) R Stubbs	6	6
(United Kingdom) J Rae (United Kingdom) H Watson	4	3
(India) S Mirza (Denmark) C Wozniacki	6^{0}	3
11	(Zimbabwe) C Black (Slovakia) D Hantuchová	7^{7}	6
16	(Chinese Taipei) S-w Hsieh (Russia) A Kudryavtseva	6	4	6
Q	(Estonia) K Kanepi (China) S Zhang	3	6	1
(Czech Republic) L Šafářová (Canada) A Wozniak	1	1
5	(United States) L Huber (United States) B Mattek-Sands	6	6

Third round
7	(United States) L Raymond (Australia) R Stubbs	6	6
11	(Zimbabwe) C Black (Slovakia) D Hantuchová	2	2
16	(Chinese Taipei) S-w Hsieh (Russia) A Kudryavtseva	6	2	4
5	(United States) L Huber (United States) B Mattek-Sands	3	6	6

Quarterfinals
7	(United States) L Raymond (Australia) R Stubbs	4	3
5	(United States) L Huber (United States) B Mattek-Sands	6	6
