= 2010 Wimbledon Championships – Men's singles =

Tennis championship

Men's singles
- 2010 Wimbledon Championships

Final
- Champion: (Spain) Rafael Nadal
- Runner-up: (Czech Republic) Tomáš Berdych
- Score: 6–3, 7–5, 6–4

Details
- Draw: 128 (16Q / 5WC)
- Seeds: 32

Events
| Singles | men | women | | boys | girls |
| Doubles | men | women | mixed | boys | girls |
| WC Singles | men | women | quad |
| WC Doubles | men | women | quad |
| Legends | men | women | seniors |
- Wimbledon Championships

Rafael Nadal defeated Tomáš Berdych in the final, 6–3, 7–5, 6–4 to win the gentlemen's singles tennis title at the 2010 Wimbledon Championships on July 5, 2010. It was his second Wimbledon title and eighth major title overall, completing the Channel Slam for the second time in his career. It was also Nadal's fourth non-consecutive Wimbledon final (he skipped the 2009 tournament because of injuries).

Roger Federer was the defending champion, but lost in the quarterfinals to Berdych. This was the first time since 2002 that Federer did not reach the final, and the second successive major in which Federer was defeated at the quarterfinal stage, having previously been on a record run of 23 successive major semifinals. Federer's loss, along with those of Lleyton Hewitt and Andy Roddick, both in the fourth round, guaranteed a first-time Wimbledon finalist from the top half of the draw.

Berdych was the first Czech man to reach the final since Ivan Lendl in 1987. For the first time, there were no English players in the Wimbledon men's singles competition, though Great Britain was represented by two players from Scotland: fourth seed Andy Murray and wildcard Jamie Baker.

The first-round match between John Isner and Nicolas Mahut set a new record for the longest tennis match in history (in both time and total of games), as well as many other records due to its length. Isner won the match, taking the final set 70–68 after a total of 11 hours and 5 minutes of play across three days. Coincidentally, the two faced each other again in the first round the following year, with Isner taking that match in straight sets, 7–6^{(7–4)}, 6–2, 7–6^{(8–6)}.

== Seeds ==
1. (Switzerland) Roger Federer (quarterfinals)
2. (Spain) Rafael Nadal (champion)
3. (Serbia) Novak Djokovic (semifinals)
4. (United Kingdom) Andy Murray (semifinals)
5. (United States) Andy Roddick (fourth round)
6. (Sweden) Robin Söderling (quarterfinals)
7. (Russia) Nikolay Davydenko (second round)
8. (Spain) Fernando Verdasco (first round)
9. (Spain) David Ferrer (fourth round)
10. (France) Jo-Wilfried Tsonga (quarterfinals)
11. (Croatia) Marin Čilić (first round)
12. (Czech Republic) Tomáš Berdych (final)
13. (Russia) Mikhail Youzhny (second round)
14. (Spain) Juan Carlos Ferrero (first round)
15. (Australia) Lleyton Hewitt (fourth round)
16. (Austria) Jürgen Melzer (fourth round)
17. (Croatia) Ivan Ljubičić (first round)
18. (United States) Sam Querrey (fourth round)
19. (Spain) Nicolás Almagro (first round)
20. (Switzerland) Stan Wawrinka (first round)
21. (France) Gaël Monfils (third round)
22. (Spain) Feliciano López (third round)
23. (United States) John Isner (second round)
24. (Cyprus) Marcos Baghdatis (first round)
25. (Brazil) Thomaz Bellucci (third round)
26. (France) Gilles Simon (third round)
27. (Latvia) Ernests Gulbis (withdrew)
28. (Spain) Albert Montañés (third round)
29. (Germany) Philipp Kohlschreiber (third round)
30. (Spain) Tommy Robredo (first round)
31. (Romania) Victor Hănescu (third round, retired due to leg injury)
32. (France) Julien Benneteau (fourth round)
33. (Germany) Philipp Petzschner (third round)

Click on the seed number of a player to go to their draw section.

Ernests Gulbis withdrew due to a muscle tear in his right thigh. He was replaced in the draw by the highest-ranked non-seeded player Philipp Petzschner, who became the #33 seed.

== Draw ==
Key

- Q = Qualifier
- WC = Wild card
- LL = Lucky loser
- Alt = Alternate
- ITF = ITF entry
- PR = Protected ranking
- SR = Special ranking
- SE = Special exempt
- JE = Junior exempt
- JR = Junior Accelerator Programme entrant
- CO = College Accelerator Programme entrant
- NG = Next Gen Accelerator Program entrant
- w/o = Walkover
- r = Retired
- d = Defaulted

=== Finals ===
Quarterfinals
1 | (Switzerland) Roger Federer | 4 | 6 | 1 | 4
12 | (Czech Republic) Tomáš Berdych | 6 | 3 | 6 | 6
3 | (Serbia) Novak Djokovic | 6 | 6 | 6
(Chinese Taipei) Lu Yen-hsun | 3 | 2 | 2
10 | (France) Jo-Wilfried Tsonga | 7^{7} | 6^{5} | 2 | 2
4 | (United Kingdom) Andy Murray | 6^{5} | 7^{7} | 6 | 6
6 | (Sweden) Robin Söderling | 6 | 3 | 6^{4} | 1
2 | (Spain) Rafael Nadal | 3 | 6 | 7^{7} | 6

Semifinals
12 | (Czech Republic) Tomáš Berdych | 6 | 7^{11} | 6
3 | (Serbia) Novak Djokovic | 3 | 6^{9} | 3
4 | (United Kingdom) Andy Murray | 4 | 6^{6} | 4
2 | (Spain) Rafael Nadal | 6 | 7^{8} | 6

Final
12 | (Czech Republic) Tomáš Berdych | 3 | 5 | 4
2 | (Spain) Rafael Nadal | 6 | 7 | 6

=== Top half ===
==== Section 1 ====
First round
1 | (Switzerland) R Federer | 5 | 4 | 6 | 7^{7} | 6
(Colombia) A Falla | 7 | 6 | 4 | 6^{1} | 0
Q | (Serbia) I Bozoljac | 7^{7} | 3 | 6 | 7^{9}
(Chile) N Massú | 6^{3} | 6 | 3 | 6^{7}
(Serbia) J Tipsarević | 3 | 6 | 4 | 5
(France) A Clément | 6 | 3 | 6 | 7
(Australia) P Luczak | 2 | 7^{7} | 6 | 7
30 | (Spain) T Robredo | 6 | 6^{3} | 2 | 5
22 | (Spain) F López | 7^{7} | 3 | 6 | 6
LL | (United States) J Levine | 6^{2} | 6 | 2 | 3
Q | (Lithuania) R Berankis | 6 | 6 | 3 | 7^{7}
Q | (Australia) C Ball | 2 | 0 | 6 | 6^{5}
(Russia) I Kunitsyn | 3 | 4 | 1
(Serbia) V Troicki | 6 | 6 | 6
(Jamaica) D Brown | 3 | 6 | 2 | 3
16 | (Austria) J Melzer | 6 | 4 | 6 | 6

Second round
1 | (Switzerland) R Federer | 6 | 6^{4} | 6 | 7^{7}
Q | (Serbia) I Bozoljac | 3 | 7^{7} | 4 | 6^{5}
(France) A Clément | 6^{4} | 6 | 6 | 6
(Australia) P Luczak | 7^{7} | 3 | 3 | 4
22 | (Spain) F López | 7 | 4 | 6 | 6
Q | (Lithuania) R Berankis | 5 | 6 | 3 | 4
(Serbia) V Troicki | 7^{7} | 6 | 3 | 6^{6} | 3
16 | (Austria) J Melzer | 6^{5} | 4 | 6 | 7^{8} | 6

Third round
1 | (Switzerland) R Federer | 6 | 6 | 6
(France) A Clément | 2 | 4 | 2
22 | (Spain) F López | 6 | 3 | 2 | 4
16 | (Austria) J Melzer | 4 | 6 | 6 | 6

Fourth round
1 | (Switzerland) R Federer | 6 | 6 | 6
16 | (Austria) J Melzer | 3 | 2 | 3

==== Section 2 ====
First round
12 | (Czech Republic) T Berdych | 7^{7} | 6 | 6
(Kazakhstan) A Golubev | 6^{5} | 2 | 2
LL | (United States) R Sweeting | 7 | 2 | 2 | 4
(Germany) B Becker | 5 | 6 | 6 | 6
PR | (Russia) D Tursunov | 2 | 2 | 3
(Germany) R Schüttler | 6 | 6 | 6
(Uzbekistan) D Istomin | 6^{5} | 6 | 2 | 7^{7} | 6
20 | (Switzerland) S Wawrinka | 7^{7} | 1 | 6 | 6^{4} | 3
31 | (Romania) V Hănescu | 6^{4} | 7^{7} | 6 | 1 | 7
WC | (Russia) A Kuznetsov | 7^{7} | 6^{3} | 3 | 6 | 5
Q | (Turkey) M İlhan | 6^{4} | 4 | 6 | 6 | 6
(Brazil) M Daniel | 7^{7} | 6 | 2 | 3 | 1
(Russia) I Andreev | 6^{5} | 6^{4} | 5
(Germany) D Brands | 7^{7} | 7^{7} | 7
(South Africa) K Anderson | 6 | 7^{7} | 6^{3} | 5 | 7
7 | (Russia) N Davydenko | 3 | 6^{3} | 7^{7} | 7 | 9

Second round
12 | (Czech Republic) T Berdych | 7 | 6 | 6
(Germany) B Becker | 5 | 3 | 4
(Germany) R Schüttler | 3 | 6^{5} | 6 | 6 | 1
(Uzbekistan) D Istomin | 6 | 7^{7} | 4 | 4 | 6
31 | (Romania) V Hănescu | 6 | 6 | 3 | 6
Q | (Turkey) M İlhan | 4 | 4 | 6 | 3
(Germany) D Brands | 1 | 7^{7} | 7^{10} | 6
7 | (Russia) N Davydenko | 6 | 6^{5} | 6^{8} | 1

Third round
12 | (Czech Republic) T Berdych | 6^{1} | 7^{7} | 6^{8} | 6 | 6
(Uzbekistan) D Istomin | 7^{7} | 6^{5} | 7^{10} | 3 | 4
31 | (Romania) V Hănescu | 7^{9} | 7^{7} | 6^{7} | 3 | 0^{r}
(Germany) D Brands | 6^{7} | 6^{3} | 7^{9} | 6 | 3

Fourth round
12 | (Czech Republic) T Berdych | 4 | 7^{7} | 7 | 6
(Germany) D Brands | 6 | 6^{1} | 5 | 3

==== Section 3 ====
First round
3 | (Serbia) N Djokovic | 4 | 6 | 3 | 6 | 6
(Belgium) O Rochus | 6 | 2 | 6 | 4 | 2
(Argentina) JI Chela | 3 | 7^{7} | 6^{3} | 5
Q | (United States) T Dent | 6 | 6^{2} | 7^{7} | 7
Q | (United States) B Evans | 6 | 7^{14} | 6
Q | (Netherlands) J Huta Galung | 3 | 6^{12} | 3
(Italy) P Lorenzi | 3 | 6^{5} | 2
28 | (Spain) A Montañés | 6 | 7^{7} | 6
21 | (France) G Monfils | 6 | 7^{11} | 6
(Argentina) L Mayer | 1 | 6^{9} | 2
(Slovakia) K Beck | 6 | 6 | 4 | 6
LL | (Spain) S Ventura Bertomeu | 3 | 1 | 6 | 2
(Argentina) E Schwank | 1 | 6^{8} | 6 | 2
(Kazakhstan) E Korolev | 6 | 7^{10} | 4 | 6
PR | (Argentina) M González | 7 | 0 | 2 | 2
15 | (Australia) L Hewitt | 5 | 6 | 6 | 6

Second round
3 | (Serbia) N Djokovic | 7^{7} | 6 | 6
Q | (United States) T Dent | 6^{5} | 1 | 4
Q | (United States) B Evans | 6 | 3 | 7^{7} | 1 | 4
28 | (Spain) A Montañés | 3 | 6 | 6^{5} | 6 | 6
21 | (France) G Monfils | 6 | 6 | 6^{4} | 6
(Slovakia) K Beck | 4 | 4 | 7^{7} | 4
(Kazakhstan) E Korolev | 4 | 4 | 0^{r}
15 | (Australia) L Hewitt | 6 | 6 | 3

Third round
3 | (Serbia) N Djokovic | 6 | 6 | 6
28 | (Spain) A Montañés | 1 | 4 | 4
21 | (France) G Monfils | 3 | 6^{9} | 4
15 | (Australia) L Hewitt | 6 | 7^{11} | 6

Fourth round
3 | (Serbia) N Djokovic | 7 | 6 | 3 | 6
15 | (Australia) L Hewitt | 5 | 4 | 6 | 4

==== Section 4 ====
First round
11 | (Croatia) M Čilić | 2 | 4 | 6^{1}
(Germany) F Mayer | 6 | 6 | 7^{7}
(United States) M Fish | 6 | 7^{10} | 6
Q | (Australia) B Tomic | 3 | 6^{8} | 2
(Argentina) H Zeballos | 5 | 4 | 3
(Chinese Taipei) Y-h Lu | 7 | 6 | 6
(Poland) M Przysiężny | 7 | 7^{7} | 6
17 | (Croatia) I Ljubičić | 5 | 6^{5} | 3
29 | (Germany) P Kohlschreiber | 6 | 3 | 6 | 6
(Italy) P Starace | 3 | 6 | 3 | 0
LL | (Paraguay) R Delgado | 6 | 4 | 4 | 2
WC | (Russia) T Gabashvili | 2 | 6 | 6 | 6
(France) M Llodra | 6 | 6 | 6^{5} | 6
Q | (United States) J Witten | 4 | 4 | 7^{7} | 3
(United States) R Ram | 3 | 2 | 2
5 | (United States) A Roddick | 6 | 6 | 6

Second round
(Germany) F Mayer | 6^{2} | 6 | 6 | 6
(United States) M Fish | 7^{7} | 3 | 4 | 4
(Chinese Taipei) Y-h Lu | 6 | 7^{9} | 6
(Poland) M Przysiężny | 4 | 6^{7} | 3
29 | (Germany) P Kohlschreiber | 7^{8} | 5 | 2 | 7^{7} | 9
WC | (Russia) T Gabashvili | 6^{6} | 7 | 6 | 6^{5} | 7
(France) M Llodra | 6 | 4 | 1 | 6^{2}
5 | (United States) A Roddick | 4 | 6 | 6 | 7^{7}

Third round
(Germany) F Mayer | 4 | 4 | 1^{r}
(Chinese Taipei) Y-h Lu | 6 | 6 | 2
29 | (Germany) P Kohlschreiber | 5 | 7^{7} | 3 | 3
5 | (United States) A Roddick | 7 | 6^{5} | 6 | 6

Fourth round
(Chinese Taipei) Y-h Lu | 4 | 7^{7} | 7^{7} | 6^{5} | 9
5 | (United States) A Roddick | 6 | 6^{3} | 6^{4} | 7^{7} | 7

=== Bottom half ===
==== Section 5 ====
First round
8 | (Spain) F Verdasco | 6^{9} | 2 | 7^{8} | 4
(Italy) F Fognini | 7^{11} | 6 | 6^{6} | 6
(United States) M Russell | 6 | 7^{7} | 2 | 7^{7}
(Spain) P Riba | 3 | 6^{1} | 6 | 6^{1}
(Germany) A Beck | 7^{7} | 6 | 6
WC | (United Kingdom) J Baker | 6^{4} | 3 | 4
PR | (Belgium) K Vliegen | 6 | 7^{8} | 1 | 2 | 5
32 | (France) J Benneteau | 2 | 6^{6} | 6 | 6 | 7
19 | (Spain) N Almagro | 6^{4} | 6^{7} | 2
(Italy) A Seppi | 7^{7} | 7^{9} | 6
Q | (Germany) T Kamke | 5 | 2 | 7 | 6 | 6
(Spain) G García López | 7 | 6 | 5 | 4 | 4
(Switzerland) M Chiudinelli | 4 | 3 | 3
(Ukraine) A Dolgopolov | 6 | 6 | 6
Q | (United States) R Kendrick | 6^{2} | 6^{6} | 6 | 4
10 | (France) J-W Tsonga | 7^{7} | 7^{8} | 3 | 6

Second round
(Italy) F Fognini | 3 | 5 | 7 | 7^{8} | 6
(United States) M Russell | 6 | 7 | 5 | 6^{6} | 3
(Germany) A Beck | 6 | 2 | 6 | 6^{5} | 3
32 | (France) J Benneteau | 3 | 6 | 4 | 7^{7} | 6
(Italy) A Seppi | 6 | 2 | 3 | 4
Q | (Germany) T Kamke | 3 | 6 | 6 | 6
(Ukraine) A Dolgopolov | 4 | 4 | 7^{7} | 7 | 8
10 | (France) J-W Tsonga | 6 | 6 | 6^{5} | 5 | 10

Third round
(Italy) F Fognini | 4 | 1 | 6 | 3
32 | (France) J Benneteau | 6 | 6 | 4 | 6
Q | (Germany) T Kamke | 1 | 4 | 6^{1}
10 | (France) J-W Tsonga | 6 | 6 | 7^{7}

Fourth round
32 | (France) J Benneteau | 1 | 4 | 6 | 1
10 | (France) J-W Tsonga | 6 | 6 | 3 | 6

==== Section 6 ====
First round
14 | (Spain) JC Ferrero | 2 | 7^{8} | 6^{5} | 6 | 1
(Belgium) X Malisse | 6 | 6^{6} | 7^{7} | 4 | 6
LL | (Germany) J Reister | 6 | 7 | 3 | 6
Q | (South Africa) R de Voest | 4 | 5 | 6 | 2
(Spain) Ó Hernández | 1 | 3 | 3
Q | (Croatia) I Dodig | 6 | 6 | 6
(Ukraine) S Stakhovsky | 6^{4} | 3 | 1^{r}
18 | (United States) S Querrey | 7^{7} | 6 | 2
26 | (France) G Simon | 6 | 6 | 7^{7}
Q | (Spain) G Alcaide | 3 | 4 | 6^{0}
(Ukraine) I Marchenko | 6 | 7 | 0
(Germany) M Berrer | 3 | 5 | 0^{r}
(Finland) J Nieminen | 6 | 7^{7} | 5 | 6
LL | (Austria) S Koubek | 4 | 6^{3} | 7 | 2
(Czech Republic) J Hájek | 5 | 1 | 2
4 | (United Kingdom) A Murray | 7 | 6 | 6

Second round
(Belgium) X Malisse | 6^{7} | 6 | 6 | 6
LL | (Germany) J Reister | 7^{9} | 4 | 1 | 4
Q | (Croatia) I Dodig | 2 | 7 | 3 | 6^{10}
18 | (United States) S Querrey | 6 | 5 | 6 | 7^{12}
26 | (France) G Simon | w/o
(Ukraine) I Marchenko
(Finland) J Nieminen | 3 | 4 | 2
4 | (United Kingdom) A Murray | 6 | 6 | 6

Third round
(Belgium) X Malisse | 7^{7} | 4 | 2 | 7 | 7
18 | (United States) S Querrey | 6^{4} | 6 | 6 | 5 | 9
26 | (France) G Simon | 1 | 4 | 4
4 | (United Kingdom) A Murray | 6 | 6 | 6

Fourth round
18 | (United States) S Querrey | 5 | 3 | 4
4 | (United Kingdom) A Murray | 7 | 6 | 6

==== Section 7 ====
First round
6 | (Sweden) R Söderling | 6 | 6 | 6
(United States) R Ginepri | 2 | 2 | 3
(Portugal) F Gil | 3 | 0 | 4
(Spain) M Granollers | 6 | 6 | 6
LL | (Japan) G Soeda | 4 | 3 | 1
Q | (Austria) M Fischer | 6 | 6 | 6
(Brazil) R Mello | 4 | 4 | 4
25 | (Brazil) T Bellucci | 6 | 6 | 6
24 | (Cyprus) M Baghdatis | 3 | 6 | 3 | 1
(Slovakia) L Lacko | 6 | 2 | 6 | 6
(France) J Chardy | 6 | 6 | 6
(Spain) D Gimeno Traver | 3 | 3 | 1
(Germany) S Gruel | 6^{2} | 3 | 2
(France) F Serra | 7^{7} | 6 | 6
WC | (Germany) N Kiefer | 4 | 2 | 3
9 | (Spain) D Ferrer | 6 | 6 | 6

Second round
6 | (Sweden) R Söderling | 7 | 6 | 6
(Spain) M Granollers | 5 | 1 | 4
Q | (Austria) M Fischer | 7^{13} | 6^{4} | 6^{1} | 2
25 | (Brazil) T Bellucci | 6^{11} | 7^{7} | 7^{7} | 6
(Slovakia) L Lacko | 3 | 6^{4} | 6 | 7^{7} | 6
(France) J Chardy | 6 | 7^{7} | 4 | 6^{5} | 8
(France) F Serra | 4 | 5 | 7^{8} | 3
9 | (Spain) D Ferrer | 6 | 7 | 6^{6} | 6

Third round
6 | (Sweden) R Söderling | 6 | 6 | 7
25 | (Brazil) T Bellucci | 4 | 2 | 5
(France) J Chardy | 5 | 3 | 6 | 6 | 5
9 | (Spain) D Ferrer | 7 | 6 | 4 | 3 | 7

Fourth round
6 | (Sweden) R Söderling | 6 | 5 | 6 | 3 | 7
9 | (Spain) D Ferrer | 2 | 7 | 2 | 6 | 5

==== Section 8 ====
First round
13 | (Russia) M Youzhny | 6 | 6 | 4 | 7^{7}
(Israel) D Sela | 3 | 4 | 6 | 6^{2}
(France) M Gicquel | 1 | 5 | 6 | 1
(France) P-H Mathieu | 6 | 7 | 3 | 6
(Netherlands) T de Bakker | 6^{4} | 6 | 6 | 5 | 16
(Colombia) S Giraldo | 7^{7} | 4 | 3 | 7 | 14
Q | (France) N Mahut | 4 | 6 | 7^{9} | 6^{3} | 68
23 | (United States) J Isner | 6 | 3 | 6^{7} | 7^{7} | 70
33 | (Germany) P Petzschner | 6 | 7^{8} | 4 | 2 | 6
(France) S Robert | 4 | 6^{6} | 6 | 6 | 4
(Slovenia) B Kavčič | 6 | 2 | 2 | 3
(Poland) Ł Kubot | 4 | 6 | 6 | 6
PR | (Netherlands) R Haase | 6 | 6 | 6
(United States) J Blake | 2 | 4 | 4
WC | (Japan) K Nishikori | 2 | 4 | 4
2 | (Spain) R Nadal | 6 | 6 | 6

Second round
13 | (Russia) M Youzhny | 4 | 6 | 6 | 3 | 4
(France) P-H Mathieu | 6 | 2 | 2 | 6 | 6
(Netherlands) T de Bakker | 6 | 6 | 6
23 | (United States) J Isner | 0 | 3 | 2
33 | (Germany) P Petzschner | 6 | 3 | 4 | 6 | 6
(Poland) Ł Kubot | 4 | 6 | 6 | 3 | 2
PR | (Netherlands) R Haase | 7 | 2 | 6 | 0 | 3
2 | (Spain) R Nadal | 5 | 6 | 3 | 6 | 6

Third round
(France) P-H Mathieu | 7^{7} | 7^{8} | 6^{8} | 6
(Netherlands) T de Bakker | 6^{5} | 6^{6} | 7^{10} | 4
33 | (Germany) P Petzschner | 4 | 6 | 7^{7} | 2 | 3
2 | (Spain) R Nadal | 6 | 4 | 6^{5} | 6 | 6

Fourth round
(France) P-H Mathieu | 4 | 2 | 2
2 | (Spain) R Nadal | 6 | 6 | 6

| Preceded by 2010 French Open – Men's singles | Grand Slam men's singles | Succeeded by 2010 US Open – Men's singles |
