= 2010 Wimbledon Championships – Boys' doubles =

Boys' doubles
- 2010 Wimbledon Championships

Final
- Champions: (United Kingdom) Liam Broady (United Kingdom) Tom Farquharson
- Runners-up: (United Kingdom) Lewis Burton (United Kingdom) George Morgan
- Score: 7–6^{(7–4)}, 6–4

Events
Singles	men	women		boys	girls
Doubles	men	women	mixed	boys	girls
WC Singles	men	women	quad
WC Doubles	men	women	quad
Legends	men	women	seniors
← 2009 ·	Wimbledon Championships	· 2011 →

Pierre-Hugues Herbert and Kevin Krawietz were the defending champions. However, Herbert was no longer eligible to compete as a Junior. Krawietz competed with Peter Heller and lost in the semifinals to Lewis Burton and George Morgan.

Liam Broady and Tom Farquharson defeated Lewis Burton and George Morgan in the final, 7–6^{(7–4)}, 6–4 to win the boys' doubles tennis title at the 2010 Wimbledon Championships. It was the first all-British final in the title's history and the first British champions since Martin Lee and James Trotman in 1995.

== Seeds ==
1. (Peru) Duilio Beretta / (Ecuador) Roberto Quiroz (second round)
2. (Bosnia and Herzegovina) Damir Džumhur / (Croatia) Mate Pavić (second round)
3. (United States) Denis Kudla / (United States) Raymond Sarmiento (second round)
4. (Colombia) Juan Sebastián Gómez / (Japan) Yasutaka Uchiyama (quarterfinals)
5. (Germany) Peter Heller / (Germany) Kevin Krawietz (semifinals)
6. (Bolivia) Hugo Dellien / (Austria) Dominic Thiem (first round)
7. (Brazil) Guilherme Clezar / (Brazil) Tiago Fernandes (quarterfinals)
8. (Slovakia) Filip Horanský / (Slovakia) Jozef Kovalík (first round)

== Draw ==
=== Key ===
- Q = Qualifier
- WC = Wild card
- LL = Lucky loser
- Alt = Alternate
- SE = Special exempt
- PR = Protected ranking
- ITF = ITF entry
- JE = Junior exempt
- w/o = Walkover
- r = Retired
- d = Defaulted
- SR = Special ranking

=== Finals ===
Semifinals
(United Kingdom) Lewis Burton (United Kingdom) George Morgan	6	3	15
5	(Germany) Peter Heller (Germany) Kevin Krawietz	3	6	13
WC	(United Kingdom) Liam Broady (United Kingdom) Tom Farquharson	6	6^{4}	6
(Russia) Mikhail Biryukov (Russia) Alexander Rumyantsev	0	7^{7}	4

Final
(United Kingdom) Lewis Burton (United Kingdom) George Morgan	6^{4}	4
WC	(United Kingdom) Liam Broady (United Kingdom) Tom Farquharson	7^{7}	6

=== Top half ===
First round
1	(Peru) Duilio Beretta (Ecuador) Roberto Quiroz	5	6	6
(United States) Nick Chappell (United States) Dane Webb	7	3	2
(Italy) Marco Cecchinato (Italy) Alessandro Colella	4	3
(United Kingdom) Lewis Burton (United Kingdom) George Morgan	6	6
(Hungary) Márton Fucsovics (Czech Republic) Libor Salaba	7^{10}	6
(Finland) Micke Kontinen (Czech Republic) Jiří Veselý	6^{8}	3
(Barbados) Darian King (Hungary) Máté Zsiga	6	6
8	(Slovakia) Filip Horanský (Slovakia) Jozef Kovalík	0	3
4	(Colombia) Juan Sebastián Gómez (Japan) Yasutaka Uchiyama	6	6
(Japan) Taro Daniel (United States) Dennis Novikov	2	1
(Australia) Benjamin Mitchell (Australia) Ben Wagland	1	4
WC	(United Kingdom) Tom Allen (United Kingdom) Jack Carpenter	6	6
Alt	(Argentina) Federico Coria (Paraguay) Diego Galeano	2	6^{3}
(United States) Mitchell Frank (United States) Junior Alexander Ore	6	7^{7}
(Argentina) Facundo Argüello (Argentina) Agustín Velotti	6^{6}	3
5	(Germany) Peter Heller (Germany) Kevin Krawietz	7^{8}	6

Second round
1	(Peru) D Beretta (Ecuador) R Quiroz	6	5	9
(United Kingdom) L Burton (United Kingdom) G Morgan	4	7	11
(Hungary) M Fucsovics (Czech Republic) L Salaba	6	6
(Barbados) D King (Hungary) M Zsiga	4	4
4	(Colombia) JS Gómez (Japan) Y Uchiyama	6	6
WC	(United Kingdom) T Allen (United Kingdom) J Carpenter	1	2
(United States) M Frank (United States) JA Ore	6^{5}	2
5	(Germany) P Heller (Germany) K Krawietz	7^{7}	6

Quarterfinals
(United Kingdom) L Burton (United Kingdom) G Morgan	6	7^{7}
(Hungary) M Fucsovics (Czech Republic) L Salaba	2	6^{1}
4	(Colombia) JS Gómez (Japan) Y Uchiyama	2	6^{3}
5	(Germany) P Heller (Germany) K Krawietz	6	7^{7}

Semifinals
(United Kingdom) L Burton (United Kingdom) G Morgan	6	3	15
5	(Germany) P Heller (Germany) K Krawietz	3	6	13

=== Bottom half ===
First round
7	(Brazil) Guilherme Clezar (Brazil) Tiago Fernandes	2	7^{7}	6
(Netherlands) Justin Eleveld (Netherlands) Jannick Lupescu	6	6^{1}	2
(Republic of Ireland) Sam Barry (New Zealand) Ben McLachlan	2	2
(Australia) Jason Kubler (Australia) Andrew Whittington	6	6
WC	(United Kingdom) Liam Broady (United Kingdom) Tom Farquharson	1	6	6
(Sweden) Tobias Blomgren (Republic of Ireland) John Morrissey	6	2	3
(Philippines) Francis Alcantara (United Kingdom) Oliver Golding	1	4
3	(United States) Denis Kudla (United States) Raymond Sarmiento	6	6
6	(Bolivia) Hugo Dellien (Austria) Dominic Thiem	6	4	1
(Russia) Mikhail Biryukov (Russia) Alexander Rumyantsev	3	6	6
WC	(United Kingdom) Luke Bambridge (United Kingdom) Kyle Edmund	6	7^{7}
(France) Romain Arneodo (France) Mick Lescure	3	6^{3}
(New Zealand) Sebastian Lavie (Argentina) Renzo Olivo	3	2
WC	(United Kingdom) Richard Gabb (United Kingdom) Ashley Hewitt	6	6
(Philippines) Jeson Patrombon (Tunisia) Ahmed Triki	3	2
2	(Bosnia and Herzegovina) Damir Džumhur (Croatia) Mate Pavić	6	6

Second round
7	(Brazil) G Clezar (Brazil) T Fernandes	7^{9}	6
(Australia) J Kubler (Australia) A Whittington	6^{7}	3
WC	(United Kingdom) L Broady (United Kingdom) T Farquharson	4	6	6
3	(United States) D Kudla (United States) R Sarmiento	6	2	2
(Russia) M Biryukov (Russia) A Rumyantsev	6	6
WC	(United Kingdom) L Bambridge (United Kingdom) K Edmund	4	2
WC	(United Kingdom) R Gabb (United Kingdom) A Hewitt	7^{7}	4	16
2	(Bosnia and Herzegovina) D Džumhur (Croatia) M Pavić	6^{3}	6	14

Quarterfinals
7	(Brazil) G Clezar (Brazil) T Fernandes	3	6	2
WC	(United Kingdom) L Broady (United Kingdom) T Farquharson	6	4	6
(Russia) M Biryukov (Russia) A Rumyantsev	6	6
WC	(United Kingdom) R Gabb (United Kingdom) A Hewitt	4	4

Semifinals
WC	(United Kingdom) L Broady (United Kingdom) T Farquharson	6	6^{4}	6
(Russia) M Biryukov (Russia) A Rumyantsev	0	7^{7}	4
