= 2010 Wimbledon Championships – Mixed doubles =

Mixed doubles
- 2010 Wimbledon Championships

Final
- Champions: (India) Leander Paes (Zimbabwe) Cara Black
- Runners-up: (South Africa) Wesley Moodie (United States) Lisa Raymond
- Score: 6–4, 7–6^{(7–5)}

Details
- Draw: 48 (5 WC )
- Seeds: 16

Events
Singles	men	women		boys	girls
Doubles	men	women	mixed	boys	girls
WC Singles	men	women	quad
WC Doubles	men	women	quad
Legends	men	women	seniors
← 2009 ·	Wimbledon Championships	· 2011 →

Mark Knowles and Anna-Lena Grönefeld were the defending champions but Grönefeld did not compete. Knowles partnered with Katarina Srebotnik but they lost in the third round to Paul Hanley and Chan Yung-jan.

Leander Paes and Cara Black defeated Wesley Moodie and Lisa Raymond in the final, 6–4, 7–6^{(7–5)} to win the mixed doubles tennis title at the 2010 Wimbledon Championships.

== Seeds ==
All seeds received a bye into the second round.

1. (Serbia) Nenad Zimonjić / (Australia) Samantha Stosur (third round)
2. (India) Leander Paes / (Zimbabwe) Cara Black (champions)
3. (India) Mahesh Bhupathi / (United States) Liezel Huber (second round)
4. (Austria) Oliver Marach / (Spain) Nuria Llagostera Vives (second round)
5. (The Bahamas) Mark Knowles / (Slovenia) Katarina Srebotnik (third round)
6. (Canada) Daniel Nestor / (United States) Bethanie Mattek-Sands (third round)
7. (Belarus) Max Mirnyi / (Russia) Alisa Kleybanova (third round)
8. (Poland) Mariusz Fyrstenberg / (China) Yan Zi (third round)
9. (Czech Republic) Lukáš Dlouhý / (Czech Republic) Iveta Benešová (semifinals)
10. (Brazil) Marcelo Melo / (Australia) Rennae Stubbs (semifinals)
11. (South Africa) Wesley Moodie / (United States) Lisa Raymond (final)
12. (Australia) Paul Hanley / (Chinese Taipei) Chan Yung-jan (quarterfinals)
13. (Sweden) Robert Lindstedt / (Russia) Ekaterina Makarova (second round)
14. (Spain) Marc López / (Spain) Anabel Medina Garrigues (withdrew)
15. (Israel) Andy Ram / (Russia) Elena Vesnina (second round)
16. (Poland) Marcin Matkowski / (Italy) Tathiana Garbin (second round)

Click on the seed number of a player to go to their draw section.

== Draw ==
=== Key ===
- Q = Qualifier
- WC = Wild card
- LL = Lucky loser
- Alt = Alternate
- SE = Special exempt
- PR = Protected ranking
- ITF = ITF entry
- JE = Junior exempt
- w/o = Walkover
- r = Retired
- d = Defaulted
- SR = Special ranking

=== Finals ===
Quarterfinals
(Belgium) Xavier Malisse (Belgium) Kim Clijsters	6^{3}	6^{3}
10	(Brazil) Marcelo Melo (Australia) Rennae Stubbs	7^{7}	7^{7}
(Austria) Julian Knowle (Kazakhstan) Yaroslava Shvedova	6^{8}	6	2
11	(South Africa) Wesley Moodie (United States) Lisa Raymond	7^{10}	3	6
9	(Czech Republic) Lukáš Dlouhý (Czech Republic) Iveta Benešová	3	6	6
(Russia) Dmitry Tursunov (Russia) Vera Dushevina	6	3	4
12	(Australia) Paul Hanley (Chinese Taipei) Chan Yung-jan	4	7^{7}	3
2	(India) Leander Paes (Zimbabwe) Cara Black	6	6^{4}	6

Semifinals
10	(Brazil) Marcelo Melo (Australia) Rennae Stubbs	4	4
11	(South Africa) Wesley Moodie (United States) Lisa Raymond	6	6
9	(Czech Republic) Lukáš Dlouhý (Czech Republic) Iveta Benešová	3	3
2	(India) Leander Paes (Zimbabwe) Cara Black	6	6

Final
11	(South Africa) Wesley Moodie (United States) Lisa Raymond	4	6^{5}
2	(India) Leander Paes (Zimbabwe) Cara Black	6	7^{7}

=== Top half ===
==== Section 1 ====
First round
(Germany) C Kas (United States) V King	3	4
WC	(United Kingdom) C Fleming (United Kingdom) S Borwell	6	6
(Belgium) X Malisse (Belgium) K Clijsters	6	6
(Slovakia) F Polášek (Chinese Taipei) C-j Chuang	3	4
(Spain) T Robredo (Canada) M-È Pelletier	6^{6}	4
(Romania) H Tecău (Romania) M Niculescu	7^{8}	6
(Pakistan) A-u-H Qureshi (Russia) A Kudryavtseva	6^{3}	3
WC	(United States) B Bryan (United States) L Davenport	7^{7}	6

Second round
1	(Serbia) N Zimonjić (Australia) S Stosur	6	6
WC	(United Kingdom) C Fleming (United Kingdom) S Borwell	1	4
(Belgium) X Malisse (Belgium) K Clijsters	6	6
15	(Israel) A Ram (Russia) E Vesnina	3	2
10	(Brazil) M Melo (Australia) R Stubbs	6	6
(Romania) H Tecău (Romania) M Niculescu	3	2
WC	(United States) B Bryan (United States) L Davenport	4	6	9
6	(Canada) D Nestor (United States) B Mattek-Sands	6	3	11

Third round
1	(Serbia) N Zimonjić (Australia) S Stosur	4	6^{4}
(Belgium) X Malisse (Belgium) K Clijsters	6	7^{7}
10	(Brazil) M Melo (Australia) R Stubbs	7	6
6	(Canada) D Nestor (United States) B Mattek-Sands	5	4

Quarterfinals
(Belgium) X Malisse (Belgium) K Clijsters	6^{3}	6^{3}
10	(Brazil) M Melo (Australia) R Stubbs	7^{7}	7^{7}

==== Section 2 ====
First round
(Austria) J Knowle (Kazakhstan) Y Shvedova	3	6	12
(Germany) P Marx (Germany) A Petkovic	6	3	10
(Brazil) B Soares (Chinese Taipei) S-w Hsieh	6	4	6
(Germany) P Petzschner (Czech Republic) B Záhlavová-Strýcová	3	6	4
(India) R Bopanna (Australia) A Rodionova	6^{4}	2
(United States) E Butorac (Belarus) O Govortsova	7^{7}	6
(Germany) M Kohlmann (Germany) J Görges	7^{9}	1	4
(Argentina) JI Chela (Argentina) G Dulko	6^{7}	6	6

Second round
4	(Austria) O Marach (Spain) N Llagostera Vives	2	2
(Austria) J Knowle (Kazakhstan) Y Shvedova	6	6
(Brazil) B Soares (Chinese Taipei) S-w Hsieh	7^{7}	6
13	(Sweden) R Lindstedt (Russia) E Makarova	6^{5}	4
11	(South Africa) W Moodie (United States) L Raymond	6	7^{7}
(United States) E Butorac (Belarus) O Govortsova	3	6^{3}
(Argentina) JI Chela (Argentina) G Dulko	6^{2}	3
7	(Belarus) M Mirnyi (Russia) A Kleybanova	7^{7}	6

Third round
(Austria) J Knowle (Kazakhstan) Y Shvedova	6	7
(Brazil) B Soares (Chinese Taipei) S-w Hsieh	4	5
11	(South Africa) W Moodie (United States) L Raymond	4	7^{7}	6
7	(Belarus) M Mirnyi (Russia) A Kleybanova	6	6^{2}	4

Quarterfinals
(Austria) J Knowle (Kazakhstan) Y Shvedova	6^{8}	6	2
11	(South Africa) W Moodie (United States) L Raymond	7^{10}	3	6

=== Bottom half ===
==== Section 3 ====
First round
(Mexico) S González (Poland) K Jans	6	6
Alt	(Czech Republic) L Friedl (Czech Republic) L Hradecká	3	3
(Brazil) A Sá (Russia) V Zvonareva	6	6
WC	(United Kingdom) J Murray (United Kingdom) L Robson	3	3
(Belgium) D Norman (Belgium) Y Wickmayer	3	6	5
WC	(United Kingdom) J Marray (United Kingdom) A Smith	6	3	7
(Netherlands Antilles) J-J Rojer (Russia) A Pavlyuchenkova	3	6	2
(Russia) D Tursunov (Russia) V Dushevina	6	3	6

Second round
8	(Poland) M Fyrstenberg (China) Z Yan	7^{7}	6
(Mexico) S González (Poland) K Jans	6^{5}	3
(Brazil) A Sá (Russia) V Zvonareva	7^{7}	4	4
9	(Czech Republic) L Dlouhý (Czech Republic) I Benešová	6^{4}	6	6
16	(Poland) M Matkowski (Italy) T Garbin	6^{6}	7^{7}	4
WC	(United Kingdom) J Marray (United Kingdom) A Smith	7^{8}	6^{3}	6
(Russia) D Tursunov (Russia) V Dushevina	6	3	6
3	(India) M Bhupathi (United States) L Huber	2	6	3

Third round
8	(Poland) M Fyrstenberg (China) Z Yan	4	4
9	(Czech Republic) L Dlouhý (Czech Republic) I Benešová	6	6
WC	(United Kingdom) J Marray (United Kingdom) A Smith	4	7^{7}	1
(Russia) D Tursunov (Russia) V Dushevina	6	6^{5}	6

Quarterfinals
9	(Czech Republic) L Dlouhý (Czech Republic) I Benešová	3	6	6
(Russia) D Tursunov (Russia) V Dushevina	6	3	4

==== Section 4 ====
First round
(Slovakia) M Mertiňák (Czech Republic) A Hlaváčková	2	3
(United Kingdom) K Skupski (United Kingdom) E Baltacha	6	6
WC	(United Kingdom) R Hutchins (United Kingdom) A Keothavong	4	4
(Spain) D Marrero (Romania) A Dulgheru	6	6
(Australia) J Kerr (Ukraine) K Bondarenko	6	6
(Sweden) J Brunström (Switzerland) T Bacsinszky	4	4
(Czech Republic) M Damm (Czech Republic) V Uhlířová	4	6	7
(Serbia) D Vemić (Italy) F Pennetta	6	3	5

Second round
5	(The Bahamas) M Knowles (Slovenia) K Srebotnik	4	6	6
(United Kingdom) K Skupski (United Kingdom) E Baltacha	6	2	3
(Spain) D Marrero (Romania) A Dulgheru	1	3
12	(Australia) P Hanley (Chinese Taipei) Y-j Chan	6	6
Alt	(Slovakia) I Zelenay (Poland) A Rosolska	5	7^{8}	7
(Australia) J Kerr (Ukraine) K Bondarenko	7	6^{6}	5
(Czech Republic) M Damm (Czech Republic) V Uhlířová	3	6	2
2	(India) L Paes (Zimbabwe) C Black	6	3	6

Third round
5	(The Bahamas) M Knowles (Slovenia) K Srebotnik	6	3	5
12	(Australia) P Hanley (Chinese Taipei) Y-j Chan	3	6	7
Alt	(Slovakia) I Zelenay (Poland) A Rosolska	1	3
2	(India) L Paes (Zimbabwe) C Black	6	6

Quarterfinals
12	(Australia) P Hanley (Chinese Taipei) Y-j Chan	4	7^{7}	3
2	(India) L Paes (Zimbabwe) C Black	6	6^{4}	6
