= 2010 Wimbledon Championships – Men's doubles =

Men's doubles
- 2010 Wimbledon Championships

Final
- Champions: (Austria) Jürgen Melzer (Germany) Philipp Petzschner
- Runners-up: (Sweden) Robert Lindstedt (Romania) Horia Tecău
- Score: 6–1, 7–5, 7–5

Details
- Draw: 64 (4 Q / 4 WC )
- Seeds: 16

Events
Singles	men	women		boys	girls
Doubles	men	women	mixed	boys	girls
WC Singles	men	women	quad
WC Doubles	men	women	quad
Legends	men	women	seniors
← 2009 ·	Wimbledon Championships	· 2011 →

Daniel Nestor and Nenad Zimonjić were the two-time defending champions, but lost in the second round to Chris Eaton and Dominic Inglot.

Jürgen Melzer and Philipp Petzschner defeated Robert Lindstedt and Horia Tecău in the final, 6–1, 7–5, 7–5, to win the gentlemen's doubles title at the 2010 Wimbledon Championships.

== Seeds ==
1. (Canada) Daniel Nestor / (Serbia) Nenad Zimonjić (second round)
2. (United States) Bob Bryan / (United States) Mike Bryan (quarterfinals)
3. (Czech Republic) Lukáš Dlouhý / (India) Leander Paes (second round)
4. (India) Mahesh Bhupathi / (Belarus) Max Mirnyi (third round)
5. (Poland) Łukasz Kubot / (Austria) Oliver Marach (first round)
6. (Poland) Mariusz Fyrstenberg / (Poland) Marcin Matkowski (second round)
7. (South Africa) Wesley Moodie / (Belgium) Dick Norman (semifinals)
8. (Austria) Julian Knowle / (Israel) Andy Ram (third round)
9. (Czech Republic) František Čermák / (Slovakia) Michal Mertiňák (second round)
10. (Sweden) Simon Aspelin / (Australia) Paul Hanley (second round)
11. (Spain) Marcel Granollers / (Spain) Tommy Robredo (quarterfinals)
12. (United States) John Isner / (United States) Sam Querrey (withdrew)
13. (United States) Mardy Fish / (The Bahamas) Mark Knowles (first round)
14. (France) Julien Benneteau / (France) Michaël Llodra (quarterfinals)
15. (Brazil) Marcelo Melo / (Brazil) Bruno Soares (second round)
16. (Sweden) Robert Lindstedt / (Romania) Horia Tecău (final)

Click on the seed number of a player to go to their draw section.

John Isner and Sam Querrey withdrew due to Isner's fatigue after his first round singles match against Nicolas Mahut.

== Draw ==
=== Key ===
- Q = Qualifier
- WC = Wild card
- LL = Lucky loser
- Alt = Alternate
- ITF = ITF entry
- PR = Protected ranking
- SR = Special ranking
- SE = Special exempt
- JE = Junior exempt
- JR = Junior Accelerator Programme entrant
- CO = College Accelerator Programme entrant
- NG = Next Gen Accelerator Program entrant
- w/o = Walkover
- r = Retired
- d = Defaulted

=== Finals ===
Quarterfinals
14	(France) Julien Benneteau (France) Michaël Llodra	6^{6}	4	6^{5}
(Argentina) Juan Ignacio Chela (Argentina) Eduardo Schwank	7^{8}	6	7^{7}
16	(Sweden) Robert Lindstedt (Romania) Horia Tecău	7^{7}	6	2	6
11	(Spain) Marcel Granollers (Spain) Tommy Robredo	6^{5}	2	6	4
(Austria) Jürgen Melzer (Germany) Philipp Petzschner	6	7^{7}	6
(India) Rohan Bopanna (Pakistan) Aisam-ul-Haq Qureshi	4	6^{3}	2
7	(South Africa) Wesley Moodie (Belgium) Dick Norman	7^{7}	7^{7}	6^{3}	7
2	(United States) Bob Bryan (United States) Mike Bryan	6^{4}	6^{5}	7^{7}	5

Semifinals
(Argentina) Juan Ignacio Chela (Argentina) Eduardo Schwank	4	5	2
16	(Sweden) Robert Lindstedt (Romania) Horia Tecău	6	7	6
(Austria) Jürgen Melzer (Germany) Philipp Petzschner	7^{7}	6	3	5	6
7	(South Africa) Wesley Moodie (Belgium) Dick Norman	6^{3}	3	6	7	3

Final
16	(Sweden) Robert Lindstedt (Romania) Horia Tecău	1	5	5
(Austria) Jürgen Melzer (Germany) Philipp Petzschner	6	7	7

=== Top half ===
==== Section 1 ====
First round
1	(Canada) D Nestor (Serbia) N Zimonjić	6	6^{2}	7^{8}	6^{2}	15
WC	(United Kingdom) J Marray (United Kingdom) J Murray	3	7^{7}	6^{6}	7^{7}	13
(Italy) F Fognini (Zimbabwe) K Ullyett	7^{9}	5	4	6^{4}
WC	(United Kingdom) C Eaton (United Kingdom) D Inglot	6^{7}	7	6	7^{7}
(Italy) D Bracciali (Italy) P Starace	4	6	6^{5}	1
(Mexico) S González (United States) T Rettenmaier	6	3	7^{7}	6
(Slovakia) K Beck (Russia) D Tursunov	1	2	6^{6}
14	(France) J Benneteau (France) M Llodra	6	6	7^{8}
LL	(Thailand) Sa Ratiwatana (Thailand) So Ratiwatana	6	6	7^{7}
LL	(Poland) T Bednarek (Poland) M Kowalczyk	1	4	6^{2}
(Germany) C Kas (Serbia) V Troicki	7^{7}	4	6^{3}	3
(Netherlands) T de Bakker (Netherlands) R Haase	6^{4}	6	7^{7}	6
Q	(Serbia) I Bozoljac (India) H Mankad	3	4	2
(Argentina) JI Chela (Argentina) E Schwank	6	6	6
(Argentina) L Mayer (Argentina) H Zeballos	6	6^{6}	6	2	8
5	(Poland) Ł Kubot (Austria) O Marach	3	7^{8}	3	6	6

Second round
1	(Canada) D Nestor (Serbia) N Zimonjić	5	7	6^{4}	7^{7}	6
WC	(United Kingdom) C Eaton (United Kingdom) D Inglot	7	5	7^{7}	6^{3}	8
(Mexico) S González (United States) T Rettenmaier	3	5	7^{7}	6^{2}
14	(France) J Benneteau (France) M Llodra	6	7	6^{2}	7^{7}
LL	(Thailand) Sa Ratiwatana (Thailand) So Ratiwatana	6	7^{8}	4	6
(Netherlands) T de Bakker (Netherlands) R Haase	4	6^{6}	6	2
(Argentina) JI Chela (Argentina) E Schwank	4	7^{7}	6	2	9
(Argentina) L Mayer (Argentina) H Zeballos	6	6^{5}	4	6	7

Third round
WC	(United Kingdom) C Eaton (United Kingdom) D Inglot	6	3	4	4
14	(France) J Benneteau (France) M Llodra	2	6	6	6
LL	(Thailand) Sa Ratiwatana (Thailand) So Ratiwatana	3	2	6^{2}
(Argentina) JI Chela (Argentina) E Schwank	6	6	7^{7}

Quarterfinals
14	(France) J Benneteau (France) M Llodra	6^{6}	4	6^{5}
(Argentina) JI Chela (Argentina) E Schwank	7^{8}	6	7^{7}

==== Section 2 ====
First round
4	(India) M Bhupathi (Belarus) M Mirnyi	7	6	7
(Argentina) M González (Argentina) S Prieto	5	1	5
(Spain) N Almagro (Spain) S Ventura Bertomeu	7	6^{4}	1	3
WC	(United Kingdom) J Delgado (United Kingdom) J Goodall	5	7^{7}	6	6
Q	(United States) J Levine (United States) R Sweeting	2	6	6	6
(France) S Robert (Netherlands) R Wassen	6	2	2	2
(Czech Republic) L Friedl (Czech Republic) D Škoch	4	3	6^{4}
16	(Sweden) R Lindstedt (Romania) H Tecău	6	6	7^{7}
11	(Spain) M Granollers (Spain) T Robredo	7^{7}	4	7^{7}	6^{2}	6
(Sweden) J Brunström (Netherlands Antilles) J-J Rojer	6^{5}	6	6^{4}	7^{7}	4
(United Kingdom) R Hutchins (Australia) J Kerr	6	7^{7}	6
WC	(United Kingdom) A Bogdanovic (United Kingdom) A Slabinsky	1	6^{2}	4
(Spain) M López (Spain) D Marrero	6	6	6
(Ukraine) A Dolgopolov (Uzbekistan) D Istomin	4	3	3
(United States) E Butorac (United States) R Ram	7^{7}	4	4	2
8	(Austria) J Knowle (Israel) A Ram	6^{3}	6	6	6

Second round
4	(India) M Bhupathi (Belarus) M Mirnyi	6	6	6
WC	(United Kingdom) J Delgado (United Kingdom) J Goodall	3	4	4
Q	(United States) J Levine (United States) R Sweeting	5	3	2
16	(Sweden) R Lindstedt (Romania) H Tecău	7	6	6
11	(Spain) M Granollers (Spain) T Robredo	7^{7}	7^{7}	6
(United Kingdom) R Hutchins (Australia) J Kerr	6^{2}	6^{5}	3
(Spain) M López (Spain) D Marrero	6^{2}	2	4
8	(Austria) J Knowle (Israel) A Ram	7^{7}	6	6

Third round
4	(India) M Bhupathi (Belarus) M Mirnyi	6	6	3	6^{8}	6
16	(Sweden) R Lindstedt (Romania) H Tecău	3	4	6	7^{10}	8
11	(Spain) M Granollers (Spain) T Robredo	6	7^{7}	1	7^{7}
8	(Austria) J Knowle (Israel) A Ram	2	6^{2}	6	6^{5}

Quarterfinals
16	(Sweden) R Lindstedt (Romania) H Tecău	7^{7}	6	2	6
11	(Spain) M Granollers (Spain) T Robredo	6^{5}	2	6	4

=== Bottom half ===
==== Section 3 ====
First round
6	(Poland) M Fyrstenberg (Poland) M Matkowski	6^{4}	6	1	7^{7}	6
(Germany) M Kohlmann (Finland) J Nieminen	7^{7}	1	6	6^{2}	4
(United States) J Cerretani (France) J Chardy	4	4	6^{2}
(Chinese Taipei) Y-h Lu (Serbia) J Tipsarević	6	6	7^{7}
(Belgium) X Malisse (Belgium) O Rochus	5	2	6^{4}
(Austria) J Melzer (Germany) P Petzschner	7	6	7^{7}
(Spain) G García López (Spain) A Montañés	6	3	3	1
10	(Sweden) S Aspelin (Australia) P Hanley	2	6	6	6
13	(United States) M Fish (The Bahamas) M Knowles	7^{7}	6^{7}	4	7^{7}	3
(Germany) P Marx (Slovakia) I Zelenay	6^{5}	7^{9}	6	6^{3}	6
Q	(India) S Devvarman (Philippines) T Huey	6	5	3	6^{6}
(India) R Bopanna (Pakistan) A-u-H Qureshi	3	7	6	7^{8}
(Colombia) A Falla (Colombia) S Giraldo	6	2	5	4
(Slovakia) L Lacko (Ukraine) S Stakhovsky	4	6	7	6
Q	(South Africa) R de Voest (Germany) M Zverev	6^{4}	4	3
3	(Czech Republic) L Dlouhý (India) L Paes	7^{7}	6	6

Second round
6	(Poland) M Fyrstenberg (Poland) M Matkowski	6	3	6	5	10
(Chinese Taipei) Y-h Lu (Serbia) J Tipsarević	3	6	4	7	12
(Austria) J Melzer (Germany) P Petzschner	6^{3}	6	6	6
10	(Sweden) S Aspelin (Australia) P Hanley	7^{7}	2	3	4
(Germany) P Marx (Slovakia) I Zelenay	7^{8}	4	4	6	11
(India) R Bopanna (Pakistan) A-u-H Qureshi	6^{6}	6	6	4	13
(Slovakia) L Lacko (Ukraine) S Stakhovsky	6	6	5	4	7
3	(Czech Republic) L Dlouhý (India) L Paes	3	3	7	6	5

Third round
(Chinese Taipei) Y-h Lu (Serbia) J Tipsarević	4	2	4
(Austria) J Melzer (Germany) P Petzschner	6	6	6
(India) R Bopanna (Pakistan) A-u-H Qureshi	7	7^{7}	6
(Slovakia) L Lacko (Ukraine) S Stakhovsky	5	6^{4}	2

Quarterfinals
(Austria) J Melzer (Germany) P Petzschner	6	7^{7}	6
(India) R Bopanna (Pakistan) A-u-H Qureshi	4	6^{3}	2

==== Section 4 ====
First round
7	(South Africa) W Moodie (Belgium) D Norman	7^{7}	6	4	6
(South Africa) J Coetzee (Belgium) K Vliegen	6^{3}	4	6	2
(Kazakhstan) A Golubev (Italy) A Seppi	6	5	7	7^{8}
(Czech Republic) J Hájek (Germany) R Schüttler	4	7	5	6^{6}
(Israel) J Erlich (Serbia) D Vemić	3	3	4
(Czech Republic) M Damm (Slovakia) F Polášek	6	6	6
(Germany) B Becker (United States) S Lipsky	6	6^{5}	6^{4}	1
9	(Czech Republic) F Čermák (Slovakia) M Mertiňák	4	7^{7}	7^{7}	6
15	(Brazil) M Melo (Brazil) B Soares	7^{7}	6	7
(Germany) S Greul (Australia) P Luczak	6^{4}	3	5
(Australia) C Ball (Australia) C Guccione	6	6	6
(Australia) S Huss (Brazil) A Sá	4	2	4
(France) A Clément (France) N Mahut	6^{4}	4	6	6^{4}
(United Kingdom) C Fleming (United Kingdom) K Skupski	7^{7}	6	3	7^{7}
(Switzerland) M Chiudinelli (United States) B Reynolds	1	4	4
2	(United States) B Bryan (United States) M Bryan	6	6	6

Second round
7	(South Africa) W Moodie (Belgium) D Norman	6	6	6
(Kazakhstan) A Golubev (Italy) A Seppi	3	4	4
(Czech Republic) M Damm (Slovakia) F Polášek	6	6	6^{7}	4	6
9	(Czech Republic) F Čermák (Slovakia) M Mertiňák	4	4	7^{9}	6	3
15	(Brazil) M Melo (Brazil) B Soares	2	3	7^{7}	6^{6}
(Australia) C Ball (Australia) C Guccione	6	6	6^{2}	7^{8}
(United Kingdom) C Fleming (United Kingdom) K Skupski	2	4	6^{5}
2	(United States) B Bryan (United States) M Bryan	6	6	7^{7}

Third round
7	(South Africa) W Moodie (Belgium) D Norman	7^{11}	7^{7}	7^{7}
(Czech Republic) M Damm (Slovakia) F Polášek	6^{9}	6^{5}	6^{3}
(Australia) C Ball (Australia) C Guccione	4	4	6^{5}
2	(United States) B Bryan (United States) M Bryan	6	6	7^{7}

Quarterfinals
7	(South Africa) W Moodie (Belgium) D Norman	7^{7}	7^{7}	6^{3}	7
2	(United States) B Bryan (United States) M Bryan	6^{4}	6^{5}	7^{7}	5
