= Tom Farquharson (tennis) =

British tennis player

- Country (sports): Great Britain
- Born: February 12, 1992 (age 33)
- Prize money: $36,812

Singles
- Career record: 0–0 (in ATP World Tour and Grand Slam main draw matches, and in Davis Cup)
- Career titles: 0
- Highest ranking: No. 429 (17 March 2014)

Grand Slam singles results
- Wimbledon Junior: 3R (2009)

Doubles
- Career record: 0–0 (in ATP World Tour and Grand Slam main draw matches, and in Davis Cup)
- Career titles: 0
- Highest ranking: No. 1,145 (1 May 2017)

Grand Slam doubles results
- Wimbledon Junior: W (2010)
- Last updated on: 1 January 2019.

Tom Farquharson is a former British tennis player who in 2010 won the Boys' Doubles at Wimbledon partnered with Liam Broady. He primarily competed on the Futures Circuit, and had a career high singles ranking of 429, achieved on 17 March 2014.

After retiring from his professional tennis career, Tom and his brother Sandy founded a world-leading padel coaching company called The Padel School. The Padel School is one of the largest English-speaking padel training platforms in the world with hundreds of thousands of followers on social media.

Tom regularly competes on the international padel circuit, and is ranked top 500 in the world.

He is also a member of the GB Men's Padel Team and is recognised as one of the best padel players in the UK.

== Challenger and Futures finals ==
=== Singles: 7 (5–2) ===
Legend (singles) ATP Challenger Tour (0–0) ITF Futures Tour (5–2)	Titles by surface Hard (4–0) Clay (0–0) Grass (0–2) Carpet (1–0)

Result	W–L	Date	Tournament	Tier	Surface	Opponent	Score
Loss	0–1	Jul 2013	Great Britain F12, Manchester	Futures	Grass	(United Kingdom) Daniel Cox	3–6, 2–6
Loss	0–2	Jul 2013	Great Britain F13, Ilkley	Futures	Grass	(New Zealand) Marcus Daniell	3–6, 6–3, 3–6
Win	1–2	Feb 2014	Great Britain F4, Wirral	Futures	Hard (i)	(United Kingdom) Daniel Smethurst	6–3, 7–5
Win	2–2	Oct 2014	Great Britain F17, Manchester	Futures	Hard (i)	(Switzerland) Adrien Bossel	6–4, 6–1
Win	3–2	Jul 2017	Ireland F1, Dublin	Futures	Carpet	(United Kingdom) Ryan James Storrie	6–4, 6–1
Win	4–2	Sep 2017	Great Britain F5, Roehampton	Futures	Hard	(Czech Republic) Michal Konečný	7–6^{(7–5)}, 6–2
Win	5–2	Sep 2017	Great Britain F6, Barnstaple	Futures	Hard (i)	(France) Grégoire Barrère	7–5, 6–3

=== Doubles: 1 (1–0) ===
Legend (doubles) ATP Challenger Tour (0–0) ITF Futures Tour (1–0)	Titles by surface Hard (0–0) Clay (1–0) Grass (0–0)

Result	W–L	Date	Tournament	Tier	Surface	Partner	Opponents	Score
Win	1–0	Aug 2016	Belgium F11, Huy	Futures	Clay	(United Kingdom) Jarryd Bant	(Belgium) Sander Gillé (Belgium) Joran Vliegen	6–3, 6–2
