= 2010 Wimbledon Championships – Women's singles =

Women's singles
- 2010 Wimbledon Championships

Final
- Champion: (United States) Serena Williams
- Runner-up: (Russia) Vera Zvonareva
- Score: 6–3, 6–2

Details
- Draw: 128 (12 Q / 7 WC )
- Seeds: 32

Events
Singles	men	women		boys	girls
Doubles	men	women	mixed	boys	girls
WC Singles	men	women	quad
WC Doubles	men	women	quad
Legends	men	women	seniors
← 2009 ·	Wimbledon Championships	· 2011 →

Defending champion Serena Williams defeated Vera Zvonareva in the final, 6–3, 6–2 to win the ladies' singles tennis title at the 2010 Wimbledon Championships. It was her fourth Wimbledon singles title and 13th major singles title overall. Williams did not lose a set during the tournament.

The reigning French Open champion Francesca Schiavone and runner-up Samantha Stosur both lost in the first round, marking the first time that the two French Open finalists lost in the opening round of Wimbledon.

Petra Kvitová (ranked 62nd) and Tsvetana Pironkova (ranked 82nd) reached the semifinals, marking the first time since 1999 that two unseeded players reached the semifinals. Pironkova became the first Bulgarian woman to reach a major semifinal. (Note: Manuela Maleeva, who previously represented Bulgaria, was representing Switzerland when she reached the US Open semifinals in 1992 and 1993.)

== Seeds ==
1. (United States) Serena Williams (champion)
2. (United States) Venus Williams (quarterfinals)
3. (Denmark) Caroline Wozniacki (fourth round)
4. (Serbia) Jelena Janković (fourth round, retired due to back injury)
5. (Italy) Francesca Schiavone (first round)
6. (Australia) Samantha Stosur (first round)
7. (Poland) Agnieszka Radwańska (fourth round)
8. (Belgium) Kim Clijsters (quarterfinals)
9. (China) Li Na (quarterfinals)
10. (Italy) Flavia Pennetta (third round)
11. (France) Marion Bartoli (fourth round)
12. (Russia) Nadia Petrova (third round)
13. (Israel) Shahar Pe'er (second round)
14. (Belarus) Victoria Azarenka (third round)
15. (Belgium) Yanina Wickmayer (third round)
16. (Russia) Maria Sharapova (fourth round)
17. (Belgium) Justine Henin (fourth round)

18. (France) Aravane Rezaï (second round)
19. (Russia) Svetlana Kuznetsova (second round)
20. (Russia) Dinara Safina (withdrew)
21. (Russia) Vera Zvonareva (final)
22. (Spain) María José Martínez Sánchez (withdrew)
23. (China) Zheng Jie (second round)
24. (Slovakia) Daniela Hantuchová (second round)
25. (Czech Republic) Lucie Šafářová (first round)
26. (Russia) Alisa Kleybanova (third round)
27. (Russia) Maria Kirilenko (third round)
28. (Ukraine) Alona Bondarenko (third round)
29. (Russia) Anastasia Pavlyuchenkova (third round)
30. (Kazakhstan) Yaroslava Shvedova (second round)
31. (Romania) Alexandra Dulgheru (third round)
32. (Italy) Sara Errani (third round)
33. (United States) Melanie Oudin (second round)
34. (Ukraine) Kateryna Bondarenko (first round)

Click on the seed number of a player to go to their draw section.

Dinara Safina and María José Martínez Sánchez withdrew due to injury; Safina with a lower back injury and Martínez Sánchez with a knee injury. They were replaced in the draw by the highest-ranked non-seeded players Melanie Oudin and Kateryna Bondarenko, who became the #33 and #34 seeds.

== Draw ==
=== Key ===
- Q = Qualifier
- WC = Wild card
- LL = Lucky loser
- Alt = Alternate
- ITF = ITF entry
- PR = Protected ranking
- SR = Special ranking
- SE = Special exempt
- JE = Junior exempt
- JR = Junior Accelerator Programme entrant
- CO = College Accelerator Programme entrant
- NG = Next Gen Accelerator Program entrant
- w/o = Walkover
- r = Retired
- d = Defaulted

=== Finals ===
Quarterfinals
1	(United States) Serena Williams	7	6
9	(China) Li Na	5	3
(Czech Republic) Petra Kvitová	4	7^{10}	8
Q	(Estonia) Kaia Kanepi	6	6^{8}	6
8	(Belgium) Kim Clijsters	6	4	2
21	(Russia) Vera Zvonareva	3	6	6
(Bulgaria) Tsvetana Pironkova	6	6
2	(United States) Venus Williams	2	3

Semifinals
1	(United States) Serena Williams	7^{7}	6
(Czech Republic) Petra Kvitová	6^{5}	2
21	(Russia) Vera Zvonareva	3	6	6
(Bulgaria) Tsvetana Pironkova	6	3	2

Final
1	(United States) Serena Williams	6	6
21	(Russia) Vera Zvonareva	3	2

=== Top half ===
==== Section 1 ====
First round
1	(United States) S Williams	6	6
(Portugal) M Larcher de Brito	0	4
(Russia) A Chakvetadze	3	6	6
(Germany) A Petkovic	6	4	4
(Thailand) T Tanasugarn	5	1
(Japan) A Morita	7	6
(Slovakia) D Cibulková	7^{7}	6
25	(Czech Republic) L Šafářová	6^{5}	4
24	(Slovakia) D Hantuchová	6^{4}	7^{7}	6
(United States) V King	7^{7}	6^{4}	3
(Czech Republic) B Záhlavová-Strýcová	6	6
(Russia) E Vesnina	1	3
(Romania) R Olaru	5	6	6
(France) A Cornet	7	4	4
LL	(Russia) A Pivovarova	1	0
16	(Russia) M Sharapova	6	6

Second round
1	(United States) S Williams	6	6
(Russia) A Chakvetadze	0	1
(Japan) A Morita	7^{7}	6^{2}	5
(Slovakia) D Cibulková	6^{4}	7^{7}	7
24	(Slovakia) D Hantuchová	6	2	4
(Czech Republic) B Záhlavová-Strýcová	1	6	6
(Romania) R Olaru	1	4
16	(Russia) M Sharapova	6	6

Third round
1	(United States) S Williams	6	7
(Slovakia) D Cibulková	0	5
(Czech Republic) B Záhlavová-Strýcová	5	3
16	(Russia) M Sharapova	7	6

Fourth round
1	(United States) S Williams	7^{11}	6
16	(Russia) M Sharapova	6^{9}	4

==== Section 2 ====
First round
9	(China) N Li	7^{7}	6
WC	(South Africa) C Scheepers	6^{5}	2
(Colombia) M Duque Mariño	4	2
Q	(Japan) K Nara	6	6
(United Kingdom) A Keothavong	6	2	4
(Australia) A Rodionova	3	6	6
(Uzbekistan) A Amanmuradova	2	7^{7}	4
19	(Russia) S Kuznetsova	6	6^{5}	6
32	(Italy) S Errani	6	6
(France) J Coin	2	4
(Spain) A Parra Santonja	6	2	6
(Belarus) O Govortsova	3	6	4
(Italy) A Brianti	6	7
(United States) J Craybas	2	5
(Hungary) M Czink	3	3
7	(Poland) A Radwańska	6	6

Second round
9	(China) N Li	6	6
Q	(Japan) K Nara	2	4
(Australia) A Rodionova	6	2	6
19	(Russia) S Kuznetsova	4	6	4
32	(Italy) S Errani	6	6
(Spain) A Parra Santonja	2	2
(Italy) A Brianti	2	0
7	(Poland) A Radwańska	6	6

Third round
9	(China) N Li	6	6
(Australia) A Rodionova	1	3
32	(Italy) S Errani	3	1
7	(Poland) A Radwańska	6	6

Fourth round
9	(China) N Li	6	6
7	(Poland) A Radwańska	3	2

==== Section 3 ====
First round
3	(Denmark) C Wozniacki	6	6
(Italy) T Garbin	1	1
(Netherlands) A Rus	0	6	3
(Chinese Taipei) K-c Chang	6	2	6
(Austria) S Bammer	3	3
(Italy) R Vinci	6	6
(Czech Republic) I Benešová	3	4
29	(Russia) A Pavlyuchenkova	6	6
23	(China) J Zheng	7	6
(France) P Parmentier	5	4
(Romania) S Cîrstea	2	2
(Czech Republic) P Kvitová	6	6
(Serbia) B Jovanovski	6	6
PR	(Australia) C Dellacqua	1	0
Q	(Croatia) M Lučić	3	3
14	(Belarus) V Azarenka	6	6

Second round
3	(Denmark) C Wozniacki	6	6
(Chinese Taipei) K-c Chang	4	3
(Italy) R Vinci	2	6^{1}
29	(Russia) A Pavlyuchenkova	6	7^{7}
23	(China) J Zheng	4	6	2
(Czech Republic) P Kvitová	6	2	6
(Serbia) B Jovanovski	1	4
14	(Belarus) V Azarenka	6	6

Third round
3	(Denmark) C Wozniacki	7	6
29	(Russia) A Pavlyuchenkova	5	4
(Czech Republic) P Kvitová	7	6
14	(Belarus) V Azarenka	5	0

Fourth round
3	(Denmark) C Wozniacki	2	0
(Czech Republic) P Kvitová	6	6

==== Section 4 ====
First round
10	(Italy) F Pennetta	6	6
(Spain) A Medina Garrigues	4	0
Q	(Romania) M Niculescu	6	6
(Argentina) G Dulko	3	2
(Czech Republic) K Zakopalová	6^{1}	6	6
(Austria) Y Meusburger	7^{7}	1	0
(Slovakia) M Rybáriková	7^{10}	2	5
18	(France) A Rezaï	6^{8}	6	7
31	(Romania) A Dulgheru	6	6^{3}	6
(Japan) K Date-Krumm	2	7^{7}	1
Q	(Italy) R Oprandi	6	1	6
WC	(United Kingdom) H Watson	4	6	3
(Switzerland) T Bacsinszky	6	5	3
(Romania) E Gallovits	4	7	6
Q	(Estonia) K Kanepi	6	6
6	(Australia) S Stosur	4	4

Second round
10	(Italy) F Pennetta	6	6
Q	(Romania) M Niculescu	1	1
(Czech Republic) K Zakopalová	5	6	6
18	(France) A Rezaï	7	3	3
31	(Romania) A Dulgheru	6	6
Q	(Italy) R Oprandi	2	0
(Romania) E Gallovits	4	5
Q	(Estonia) K Kanepi	6	7

Third round
10	(Italy) F Pennetta	2	3
(Czech Republic) K Zakopalová	6	6
31	(Romania) A Dulgheru	1	2
Q	(Estonia) K Kanepi	6	6

Fourth round
(Czech Republic) K Zakopalová	2	4
Q	(Estonia) K Kanepi	6	6

=== Bottom half ===
==== Section 5 ====
First round
8	(Belgium) K Clijsters	6	6
(Italy) ME Camerin	0	3
(Croatia) K Šprem	6	6
Q	(United States) B Mattek-Sands	3	4
Q	(United States) S Perry	6	4	9
Q	(Belarus) A Yakimova	2	6	7
(Switzerland) S Vögele	6	4	5
27	(Russia) M Kirilenko	2	6	7
17	(Belgium) J Henin	6	6
(Latvia) A Sevastova	4	3
(Germany) K Barrois	6	6
(Ukraine) M Koryttseva	3	4
(Chinese Taipei) Y-j Chan	6	6
(Switzerland) P Schnyder	0	2
(Germany) T Malek	4	3
12	(Russia) N Petrova	6	6

Second round
8	(Belgium) K Clijsters	6	6
(Croatia) K Šprem	3	2
Q	(United States) S Perry	1	4
27	(Russia) M Kirilenko	6	6
17	(Belgium) J Henin	6	7
(Germany) K Barrois	3	5
(Chinese Taipei) Y-j Chan	3	4
12	(Russia) N Petrova	6	6

Third round
8	(Belgium) K Clijsters	6	6
27	(Russia) M Kirilenko	3	3
17	(Belgium) J Henin	6	6
12	(Russia) N Petrova	1	4

Fourth round
8	(Belgium) K Clijsters	2	6	6
17	(Belgium) J Henin	6	2	3

==== Section 6 ====
First round
15	(Belgium) Y Wickmayer	6	5	6
WC	(United States) A Riske	4	7	3
LL	(Canada) S Dubois	4	4
(Belgium) K Flipkens	6	6
WC	(Thailand) N Lertcheewakarn	3	2
Q	(Czech Republic) A Hlaváčková	6	6
Q	(Spain) N Llagostera Vives	4	1
21	(Russia) V Zvonareva	6	6
28	(Ukraine) A Bondarenko	6	6^{10}	6
WC	(United Kingdom) K O'Brien	3	7^{12}	4
(Czech Republic) L Hradecká	4	5
(United States) V Lepchenko	6	7
Q	(Greece) E Daniilidou	5	5
(Canada) A Wozniak	7	7
WC	(United Kingdom) L Robson	3	6^{5}
4	(Serbia) J Janković	6	7^{7}

Second round
15	(Belgium) Y Wickmayer	7^{11}	6
(Belgium) K Flipkens	6^{9}	4
Q	(Czech Republic) A Hlaváčková	1	4
21	(Russia) V Zvonareva	6	6
28	(Ukraine) A Bondarenko	4	6	6
(United States) V Lepchenko	6	4	3
(Canada) A Wozniak	6	2	4
4	(Serbia) J Janković	4	6	6

Third round
15	(Belgium) Y Wickmayer	4	2
21	(Russia) V Zvonareva	6	6
28	(Ukraine) A Bondarenko	0	3
4	(Serbia) J Janković	6	6

Fourth round
21	(Russia) V Zvonareva	6	3
4	(Serbia) J Janković	1	0^{r}

==== Section 7 ====
First round
5	(Italy) F Schiavone	7^{7}	5	1
(Russia) V Dushevina	6^{0}	7	6
(Bulgaria) T Pironkova	6	7^{9}
(Russia) A Lapushchenkova	0	6^{7}
(Russia) R Kulikova	6	6
WC	(United Kingdom) M South	1	2
(Slovenia) P Hercog	1	4
30	(Kazakhstan) Y Shvedova	6	6
34	(Ukraine) K Bondarenko	6^{1}	6	3
Q	(Hungary) G Arn	7^{7}	3	6
(Slovakia) Z Kučová	2	5
(Australia) A Molik	6	7
(Croatia) P Martić	2	7	6
(United Kingdom) E Baltacha	6	5	3
(Germany) J Görges	4	3
11	(France) M Bartoli	6	6

Second round
(Russia) V Dushevina	3	4
(Bulgaria) T Pironkova	6	6
(Russia) R Kulikova	6	6
30	(Kazakhstan) Y Shvedova	2	4
Q	(Hungary) G Arn	7	6
(Australia) A Molik	5	4
(Croatia) P Martić	w/o
11	(France) M Bartoli

Third round
(Bulgaria) T Pironkova	6	2
(Russia) R Kulikova	4	0^{r}
Q	(Hungary) G Arn	3	4
11	(France) M Bartoli	6	6

Fourth round
(Bulgaria) T Pironkova	6	6
11	(France) M Bartoli	4	4

==== Section 8 ====
First round
13	(Israel) S Pe'er	6	6
(Serbia) A Ivanovic	3	4
(India) S Mirza	4	1
(Germany) A Kerber	6	6
(Czech Republic) R Voráčová	4	3
(Australia) J Groth	6	6
(Germany) A-L Grönefeld	3	0
33	(United States) M Oudin	6	6
26	(Russia) A Kleybanova	6	6
(Czech Republic) S Záhlavová	2	3
(Sweden) S Arvidsson	4	1
(Russia) A Kudryavtseva	6	6
(Russia) E Makarova	6	7^{7}
(Hungary) Á Szávay	4	6^{2}
(Paraguay) R de los Ríos	3	2
2	(United States) V Williams	6	6

Second round
13	(Israel) S Pe'er	6	3	4
(Germany) A Kerber	3	6	6
(Australia) J Groth	6	6
33	(United States) M Oudin	4	3
26	(Russia) A Kleybanova	6	6
(Russia) A Kudryavtseva	4	2
(Russia) E Makarova	0	4
2	(United States) V Williams	6	6

Third round
(Germany) A Kerber	3	5
(Australia) J Groth	6	7
26	(Russia) A Kleybanova	4	2
2	(United States) V Williams	6	6

Fourth round
(Australia) J Groth	4	6^{5}
2	(United States) V Williams	6	7^{7}

== Championship match statistics ==
Category	(United States) S. Williams	(Russia) Zvonareva
1st serve %	33/50 (66%)	41/55 (75%)
1st serve points won	31 of 33 = 94%	26 of 41 = 63%
2nd serve points won	7 of 17 = 41%	5 of 14 = 36%
Total service points won	38 of 50 = 76.00%	31 of 55 = 56.36%
Aces	9	4
Double faults	3	2
Winners	29	9
Unforced errors	15	11
Net points won	13 of 13 = 100%	5 of 9 = 56%
Break points converted	3 of 7 = 43%	0 of 0 = 0%
Return points won	24 of 55 = 44%	12 of 50 = 24%
Total points won	62	43

== Notes ==
Preceded by 2010 French Open – Women's singles	Grand Slam women's singles	Succeeded by 2010 US Open – Women's singles
