= 2010 Grand Prix Hassan II =

- Date: 5–11 April
- Edition: 26th
- Category: ATP Tour World 250
- Draw: 28S / 16D
- Prize money: €398,250
- Surface: Clay
- Location: Casablanca, Morocco
- Venue: Complexe Al Amal

Champions

Singles
- (Switzerland) Stan Wawrinka

Doubles
- (Sweden) Robert Lindstedt / (Romania) Horia Tecău
- Grand Prix Hassan II

The 2010 Grand Prix Hassan II was a men's tennis tournament played on outdoor clay courts. It was the 26th edition of the Grand Prix Hassan II, and an ATP Tour World 250 event on the 2010 ATP World Tour. It was the 26th edition of the tournament and took place at the Complexe Al Amal in Casablanca, Morocco, from 5 April through 11 April 2010. `First-seeded Stan Wawrinka won the singles title.

== Entrants ==
=== Seeds ===
Athlete	Nationality	Ranking*	Seeding
Stan Wawrinka	Switzerland	23	1
Guillermo García-López	Spain	41	2
Victor Hănescu	Romania	42	3
Łukasz Kubot	Poland	43	4
Paul-Henri Mathieu	France	44	5
Simon Greul	Germany	55	6
Olivier Rochus	Belgium	59	7
Florent Serra	France	61	8

- Rankings and seedings are as of March 22, 2010.

=== Other entrants ===
The following players received wildcards into the main draw:

- (Morocco) Reda El Amrani
- (France) Paul-Henri Mathieu
- (Morocco) Mehdi Ziadi

The following players received entry via qualifying:

- (Slovakia) Martin Kližan
- (Austria) Stefan Koubek
- (Spain) Iván Navarro
- (Finland) Jarkko Nieminen

== Finals ==
=== Singles ===
(Switzerland) Stan Wawrinka defeated (Romania) Victor Hănescu, 6–2, 6–3

- It was Wawrinka's first title of the year (and first in 4 years) and second title of his career.

=== Doubles ===
(Sweden) Robert Lindstedt / (Romania) Horia Tecău defeated (India) Rohan Bopanna / (Pakistan) Aisam-ul-Haq Qureshi, 6–2, 3–6, [10–7]
