= 2010 Grand Prix Hassan II – Singles =

Singles
- 2010 Grand Prix Hassan II

Final
- Champion: (Switzerland) Stanislas Wawrinka
- Runner-up: (Romania) Victor Hănescu
- Score: 6–2, 6–3

Events
Singles	Doubles
← 2009 ·	Grand Prix Hassan II	· 2011 →

Juan Carlos Ferrero was the defender of championship title; however, he chose to not participate this year.
Stanislas Wawrinka defeated Victor Hănescu in the final 6–2, 6–3.

== Seeds ==
The top four seeds receive a bye into the second round.

1. (Switzerland) Stanislas Wawrinka (champion)
2. (Spain) Guillermo García López (quarterfinals)
3. (Romania) Victor Hănescu (final)
4. (Poland) Łukasz Kubot (quarterfinals)
5. (France) Paul-Henri Mathieu (first round)
6. (Germany) Simon Greul (first round)
7. (Belgium) Olivier Rochus (first round)
8. (France) Florent Serra (semifinals)

== Draw ==
=== Key ===
- Q = Qualifier
- WC = Wild card
- LL = Lucky loser
- Alt = Alternate
- SE = Special exempt
- PR = Protected ranking
- ITF = ITF entry
- JE = Junior exempt
- w/o = Walkover
- r = Retired
- d = Defaulted
- SR = Special ranking

=== Finals ===
Semifinals
1	(Switzerland) Stanislas Wawrinka	6	3	6
(Italy) Potito Starace	4	6	4
3	(Romania) Victor Hănescu	6	6
8	(France) Florent Serra	4	1

Final
1	(Switzerland) Stanislas Wawrinka	6	6
3	(Romania) Victor Hănescu	2	3

=== Top half ===
First round
(Ukraine) O Dolgopolov Jr.	6	1	5
Q	(Slovakia) M Kližan	4	6	7
(Russia) T Gabashvili	6^{5}	6	6^{4}
WC	(Morocco) R El Amrani	7^{7}	4	7^{7}
(Czech Republic) J Hájek	7^{7}	6
6	(Germany) S Greul	6^{3}	4
(France) A Clément	6	6
Q	(Spain) I Navarro	3	3
(Italy) P Starace	6	7
(Australia) P Luczak	3	5
(Spain) Ó Hernández	7^{9}	6
5/WC	(France) P-H Mathieu	6^{7}	3

Second round
1	(Switzerland) S Wawrinka	6	0	6
Q	(Slovakia) M Kližan	4	6	4
WC	(Morocco) R El Amrani	6	2	6
(Czech Republic) J Hájek	3	6	2
4	(Poland) Ł Kubot	6	6
(France) A Clément	4	1
(Italy) P Starace	6	6
(Spain) Ó Hernández	2	1

Quarterfinals
1	(Switzerland) S Wawrinka	6	6
WC	(Morocco) R El Amrani	3	1
4	(Poland) Ł Kubot	1	0
(Italy) P Starace	6	6

Semifinals
1	(Switzerland) S Wawrinka	6	3	6
(Italy) P Starace	4	6	4

=== Bottom half ===
First round
7	(Belgium) O Rochus	1	1
(France) R Gasquet	6	6
(Kazakhstan) A Golubev	6	7^{7}
(Austria) D Köllerer	2	6^{5}
Q	(Finland) J Nieminen	6	6
WC	(Morocco) M Ziadi	1	1
8	(France) F Serra	6	6
(Spain) S Ventura	4	3
Q	(Austria) S Koubek	3	7	5
(France) S Robert	6	5	7
(Netherlands) R Haase	6^{7}	6^{5}
(Spain) M Granollers	7^{9}	7^{7}

Second round
(France) R Gasquet	6	6
(Kazakhstan) A Golubev	1	1
Q	(Finland) J Nieminen	6	3	2
3	(Romania) V Hănescu	2	6	6
8	(France) F Serra	2	6	6
(France) S Robert	6	1	3
(Spain) M Granollers	3	2
2	(Spain) G García López	6	6

Quarterfinals
(France) R Gasquet	6^{3}	6	3
3	(Romania) V Hănescu	7^{7}	4	6
8	(France) F Serra	6	6
2	(Spain) G García López	2	2

Semifinals
3	(Romania) V Hănescu	6	6
8	(France) F Serra	4	1

== Qualifying ==
=== Seeds ===
1. (Finland) Jarkko Nieminen (qualified)
2. (Portugal) Fred Gil (qualifying competition)
3. (Spain) Iván Navarro (qualified)
4. (Austria) Stefan Koubek (qualified)
5. (Spain) Alberto Martín (first round)
6. (France) David Guez (second round)
7. (Croatia) Ivan Dodig (qualifying competition)
8. (Italy) Flavio Cipolla (first round)

=== Qualifiers ===
1. (Finland) Jarkko Nieminen
2. (Slovakia) Martin Kližan
3. (Spain) Iván Navarro
4. (Austria) Stefan Koubek

=== Draw ===
==== First qualifier ====
First round
1	(Finland) Jarkko Nieminen	5	6	7
(Austria) Oliver Marach	7	3	5
(Switzerland) George Bastl	2	4
(Morocco) Talal Ouahabi	6	6
(Spain) Adrián Menéndez Maceiras	5	7	6
(Kazakhstan) Yuri Schukin	7	5	4
(Spain) Íñigo Cervantes	6	6
8	(Italy) Flavio Cipolla	4	2

Second round
1	(Finland) Jarkko Nieminen	6	6
(Morocco) Talal Ouahabi	1	0
(Spain) Adrián Menéndez Maceiras	6	6
(Spain) Íñigo Cervantes	4	4

Qualifying competition
1	(Finland) Jarkko Nieminen	6	6
(Spain) Adrián Menéndez Maceiras	2	0

==== Second qualifier ====
First round
2	(Portugal) Fred Gil	4	6	6
(Morocco) Lamine Ouahab	6	3	2
(Spain) Gabriel Trujillo Soler	6	6
WC	(Morocco) Mohamed Saber	0	1
(Czech Republic) Leoš Friedl	6^{5}	6	3
(Slovakia) Martin Kližan	7^{7}	3	6
(Spain) Miguel Ángel López Jaén	7^{8}	4	0^{r}
6	(France) David Guez	6^{6}	6	3

Second round
2	(Portugal) Fred Gil	6	6
(Spain) Gabriel Trujillo Soler	4	4
(Slovakia) Martin Kližan	7^{7}	6
6	(France) David Guez	6^{5}	2

Qualifying competition
2	(Portugal) Fred Gil	2	6^{1}
(Slovakia) Martin Kližan	6	7^{7}

==== Third qualifier ====
First round
3	(Spain) Iván Navarro	6	6
(Netherlands) Matwé Middelkoop	1	4
WC	(Morocco) Mehdi Benhammou	6	6
WC	(Morocco) Ali El Alaoui	3	3
(Spain) José Checa Calvo	6	6
(Czech Republic) David Škoch	1	4
(Spain) Pablo Martin Adalia	5	1
7	(Croatia) Ivan Dodig	7	6

Second round
3	(Spain) Iván Navarro	6	6
WC	(Morocco) Mehdi Benhammou	0	1
(Spain) José Checa Calvo	6^{4}	6	2
7	(Croatia) Ivan Dodig	7^{7}	2	6

Qualifying competition
3	(Spain) Iván Navarro	5	7^{7}	7^{7}
7	(Croatia) Ivan Dodig	7	6^{4}	6^{4}

==== Fourth qualifier ====
First round
4	(Austria) Stefan Koubek	6	6
WC	(Morocco) Hamza Aglaib	0	4
(France) Éric Prodon	7	6
(Spain) Guillermo Alcaide	5	2
(Morocco) Mohcine Roudami	2	3
(Croatia) Antonio Veić	6	6
(Spain) Sergio Gutiérrez Ferrol	6^{3}	7	6
5	(Spain) Alberto Martín	7^{7}	5	3

Second round
4	(Austria) Stefan Koubek	7^{7}	6
(France) Éric Prodon	6^{3}	4
(Croatia) Antonio Veić	6^{7}	6	6
(Spain) Sergio Gutiérrez Ferrol	7^{9}	1	4

Qualifying competition
4	(Austria) Stefan Koubek	6^{5}	6	6
(Croatia) Antonio Veić	7^{7}	3	4
