= 2011 Grand Prix Hassan II =

- Date: 4–10 April
- Edition: 27th
- Category: World Tour 250
- Draw: 28S / 16D
- Prize money: €450,000
- Surface: Clay / outdoor
- Location: Casablanca, Morocco
- Venue: Complexe Al Amal

Champions

Singles
- (Spain) Pablo Andújar

Doubles
- (Sweden) Robert Lindstedt / (Romania) Horia Tecău
- Grand Prix Hassan II

The 2011 Grand Prix Hassan II was a men's tennis tournament played on outdoor clay courts. It was the 27th edition of the Grand Prix Hassan II, and an World Tour 250 event on the 2011 ATP World Tour. It took place at the Complexe Al Amal in Casablanca, Morocco, from 4 April until 10 April 2011. Unseeded Pablo Andújar won the singles title.

== Entrants ==
=== Seeds ===
Country	Player	Rank^{1}	Seed
ESP	Albert Montañés	22	1
CYP	Marcos Baghdatis	24	2
FRA	Gilles Simon	27	3
KAZ	Andrey Golubev	37	4
ITA	Potito Starace	47	5
FRA	Jérémy Chardy	49	6
ITA	Fabio Fognini	53	7
ROU	Victor Hănescu	59	8

- Rankings and seedings are as of March 21, 2011.

=== Other entrants ===
The following players received wildcards into the main draw:

- (Cyprus) Marcos Baghdatis
- (France) Jérémy Chardy
- (Morocco) Reda El Amrani

The following players received entry via qualifying:

- (France) Nicolas Devilder
- (Spain) Gerard Granollers
- (Spain) Sergio Gutiérrez-Ferrol
- (Russia) Andrey Kuznetsov

== Finals ==
=== Singles ===
(Spain) Pablo Andújar defeated (Italy) Potito Starace, 6–1, 6–2

- It was Andújar's 1st career title.

=== Doubles ===
(Sweden) Robert Lindstedt / (Romania) Horia Tecău defeated (United Kingdom) Colin Fleming / (Slovakia) Igor Zelenay, 6–2, 6–1
