= 2011 Grand Prix Hassan II – Singles Qualifying =

This article displays the tennis qualifying draw of the 2011 Grand Prix Hassan II.

== Players ==
=== Seeds ===
1. (Kazakhstan) Mikhail Kukushkin (qualifying competition)
2. (Kazakhstan) Yuri Schukin (second round)
3. (Republic of Ireland) Conor Niland (qualifying competition)
4. (Spain) Daniel Muñoz-de la Nava (second round)
5. (France) Vincent Millot (second round)
6. (Slovakia) Martin Kližan (first round, retired)
7. (Australia) Peter Luczak (second round)
8. (Czech Republic) Jan Hernych (first round)

=== Qualifiers ===
1. (Spain) Sergio Gutiérrez-Ferrol
2. (Spain) Gerard Granollers-Pujol
3. (Russia) Andrey Kuznetsov
4. (France) Nicolas Devilder

== Qualifying draw ==
=== First qualifier ===
First Round
1	(Kazakhstan) Mikhail Kukushkin	6	6
(Germany) Michael Kohlmann	1	2
(United Kingdom) Colin Fleming	4	3
(Morocco) Mehdi Ziadi	6	6
(Germany) Dieter Kindlmann	3	6	2
(Russia) Andrey Kumantsov	6	4	6
(Spain) Sergio Gutiérrez-Ferrol	6	4
6	(Slovakia) Martin Kližan	2	1^{r}

Second Round
1	(Kazakhstan) Mikhail Kukushkin	6	1	6
(Morocco) Mehdi Ziadi	4	6	4
(Russia) Andrey Kumantsov
(Spain) Sergio Gutiérrez-Ferrol	w/o

Qualifying Competition
1	(Kazakhstan) Mikhail Kukushkin	6^{7}	6	6^{4}
(Spain) Sergio Gutiérrez-Ferrol	7^{9}	4	7^{7}

=== Second qualifier ===
First Round
2	(Kazakhstan) Yuri Schukin	6	6
(Austria) Stefan Koubek	4	4
(Spain) Roberto Bautista-Agut	7^{7}	6
(Kazakhstan) Evgeny Korolev	6^{2}	4
(Spain) Gerard Granollers	7^{7}	6
(Italy) Thomas Fabbiano	6^{1}	3
(Spain) Pablo Carreño-Busta	4	6	6
8	(Czech Republic) Jan Hernych	6	3	4

Second Round
2	(Kazakhstan) Yuri Schukin	6^{5}	6	4
(Spain) Roberto Bautista-Agut	7^{7}	4	6
(Spain) Gerard Granollers	6	3	7^{7}
(Spain) Pablo Carreño-Busta	0	6	6^{1}

Qualifying Competition
(Spain) Roberto Bautista-Agut	4	7^{8}	2
(Spain) Gerard Granollers	6	6^{6}	6

=== Third qualifier ===
First Round
3	(Republic of Ireland) Conor Niland	6	3	6
(Spain) Iván Navarro	4	6	3
(United Kingdom) Daniel Smethurst	3	7^{9}	6
WC	(Morocco) Talal Ouahabi	6	6^{7}	3
WC	(Morocco) Yassine Idmbarek	1	0
(Russia) Andrey Kuznetsov	6	6
WC	(Morocco) Hicham Khaddari	5	4
5	(France) Vincent Millot	7	6

Second Round
3	(Republic of Ireland) Conor Niland	6^{2}	6	6
(United Kingdom) Daniel Smethurst	7^{7}	4	3
(Russia) Andrey Kuznetsov	6	6
5	(France) Vincent Millot	4	2

Qualifying Competition
3	(Republic of Ireland) Conor Niland	2	0
(Russia) Andrey Kuznetsov	6	6

=== Fourth qualifier ===
First Round
4	(Spain) Daniel Muñoz-de la Nava	6	6
(Algeria) Lamine Ouahab	0	3
(France) Nicolas Devilder	6	6
WC	(Morocco) Anas Fattar	3	3
(Tunisia) Malek Jaziri	4	6	1
(Austria) Alexander Peya	6	0	6
(Czech Republic) Jan Mertl	2	6^{2}
7	(Australia) Peter Luczak	6	7^{7}

Second Round
4	(Spain) Daniel Muñoz-de la Nava	6	3	2
(France) Nicolas Devilder	4	6	6
(Austria) Alexander Peya	7^{9}	0	6
7	(Australia) Peter Luczak	6^{7}	6	2

Qualifying Competition
(France) Nicolas Devilder	6	7
(Austria) Alexander Peya	2	5
