= 2010 Grand Prix Hassan II – Doubles =

Doubles
- 2010 Grand Prix Hassan II

Final
- Champions: (Sweden) Robert Lindstedt (Romania) Horia Tecău
- Runners-up: (India) Rohan Bopanna (Pakistan) Aisam-ul-Haq Qureshi
- Score: 6–2, 3–6, [10–7]

Events
Singles	Doubles
← 2009 ·	Grand Prix Hassan II	· 2011 →

Łukasz Kubot and Oliver Marach were the defenders of championship title; however, they were defeated by Polish unseeded pair Tomasz Bednarek and Mateusz Kowalczyk in the first round (6–1, 0–6, [10–12]).
Robert Lindstedt and Horia Tecău won in the final 6–2, 3–6, [10–7], against Rohan Bopanna and Aisam-ul-Haq Qureshi.

== Seeds ==
1. (Poland) Łukasz Kubot / (Austria) Oliver Marach (first round)
2. (Spain) Marcel Granollers / (Spain) Marc López (semifinals)
3. (Sweden) Robert Lindstedt / (Romania) Horia Tecău (champions)
4. (Germany) Michael Kohlmann / (Finland) Jarkko Nieminen (first round)

== Draw ==
=== Key ===
- Q = Qualifier
- WC = Wild card
- LL = Lucky loser
- Alt = Alternate
- SE = Special exempt
- PR = Protected ranking
- ITF = ITF entry
- JE = Junior exempt
- w/o = Walkover
- r = Retired
- d = Defaulted
- SR = Special ranking

=== Draw ===
First round
1	(Poland) Ł Kubot (Austria) O Marach	6	0	[10]
(Poland) T Bednarek (Poland) M Kowalczyk	1	6	[12]
(Germany) P Marx (Slovakia) I Zelenay	7	6
(Ukraine) O Dolgopolov Jr. (Russia) D Sitak	5	4
4	(Germany) M Kohlmann (Finland) J Nieminen	4	2
(Germany) S Greul (Australia) P Luczak	6	6
(India) R Bopanna (Pakistan) A-u-H Qureshi	4	6	[10]
WC	(Morocco) R Chaki (Morocco) R El Amrani	6	2	[8]
(United Kingdom) C Fleming (United Kingdom) K Skupski	6	6
WC	(Morocco) T Ouahabi (Morocco) M Ziadi	3	1
(Switzerland) Y Allegro (Switzerland) S Wawrinka	6^{9}	5
3	(Sweden) R Lindstedt (Romania) H Tecău	7^{11}	7
(France) A Clément (France) F Serra	1	4
(Czech Republic) L Friedl (Czech Republic) D Škoch	6	6
(Spain) G García-López (Brazil) M Melo	5	4
2	(Spain) M Granollers (Spain) M López	7	6

Quarterfinals
(Poland) T Bednarek (Poland) M Kowalczyk	1	7^{7}	[7]
(Germany) P Marx (Slovakia) I Zelenay	6	6^{2}	[10]
(Germany) S Greul (Australia) P Luczak	3	2
(India) R Bopanna (Pakistan) A-u-H Qureshi	6	6
(United Kingdom) C Fleming (United Kingdom) K Skupski	2	4
3	(Sweden) R Lindstedt (Romania) H Tecău	6	6
(Czech Republic) L Friedl (Czech Republic) D Škoch	2	4
2	(Spain) M Granollers (Spain) M López	6	6

Semifinals
(Germany) P Marx (Slovakia) I Zelenay	3	4
(India) R Bopanna (Pakistan) A-u-H Qureshi	6	6
3	(Sweden) R Lindstedt (Romania) H Tecău	6	6
2	(Spain) M Granollers (Spain) M López	4	3

Finals
(India) R Bopanna (Pakistan) A-u-H Qureshi	2	6	[7]
3	(Sweden) R Lindstedt (Romania) H Tecău	6	3	[10]
