= 2011 Grand Prix Hassan II – Singles =

Singles
- 2011 Grand Prix Hassan II

Final
- Champions: (Spain) Pablo Andújar
- Runners-up: (Italy) Potito Starace
- Score: 6–1, 6–2

Details
- Draw: 28
- Seeds: 8

Events
Singles	Doubles
← 2010 ·	Grand Prix Hassan II	· 2012 →

Stanislas Wawrinka was the defending champion, but hasn't entered this year.
Pablo Andújar defeated Potito Starace 6–1, 6–2 in the final match.

== Seeds ==
The top four seeds receive a bye into the second round.

1. (Spain) Albert Montañés (semifinals)
2. (Cyprus) Marcos Baghdatis (second round)
3. (France) Gilles Simon (quarterfinals)
4. (Kazakhstan) Andrey Golubev (second round)
5. (Italy) Potito Starace (final)
6. (France) Jérémy Chardy (second round)
7. (Italy) Fabio Fognini (quarterfinals)
8. (Romania) Victor Hănescu (semifinals)

== Draw ==
=== Key ===
- Q = Qualifier
- WC = Wild card
- LL = Lucky loser
- Alt = Alternate
- ITF = ITF entry
- PR = Protected ranking
- SR = Special ranking
- SE = Special exempt
- JE = Junior exempt
- JR = Junior Accelerator Programme entrant
- CO = College Accelerator Programme entrant
- NG = Next Gen Accelerator Program entrant
- w/o = Walkover
- r = Retired
- d = Defaulted

=== Finals ===
Semifinals
1	(Spain) Albert Montañés	4	4
(Spain) Pablo Andújar	6	6
5	(Italy) Potito Starace	6	6^{3}	7^{7}
8	(Romania) Victor Hănescu	1	7^{7}	6^{2}

Final
(Spain) Pablo Andújar	6	6
5	(Italy) Potito Starace	1	2

=== Top half ===
First round
(Italy) F Volandri	7	6
(France) J Benneteau	5	2
(Slovenia) B Kavčič	3
WC	(Morocco) R El Amrani	4^{r}
Q	(Spain) G Granollers-Pujol	2	6	3
7	(Italy) F Fognini	6	4	6
(Spain) P Riba	6	6
(Netherlands) J Huta Galung	3	3
(Spain) P Andújar	6	3	6
(France) F Serra	1	6	2
(Germany) B Phau	2	5
6/WC	(France) J Chardy	6	7

Second round
1	(Spain) A Montañés	6	6
(Italy) F Volandri	1	4
(Slovenia) B Kavčič	6	5	5
7	(Italy) F Fognini	1	7	7
4	(Kazakhstan) A Golubev	6	1	5
(Spain) P Riba	0	6	7
(Spain) P Andújar	7^{8}	6
6/WC	(France) J Chardy	6^{6}	1

Quarterfinals
1	(Spain) A Montañés	7^{7}	6
7	(Italy) F Fognini	6^{1}	1
(Spain) P Riba	2	2
(Spain) P Andújar	6	6

Semifinals
1	(Spain) A Montañés	4	4
(Spain) P Andújar	6	6

=== Bottom half ===
First round
5	(Italy) P Starace	7	6
(Germany) D Brands	5	2
(Portugal) R Machado	5	1
(Spain) R Ramírez Hidalgo	7	6
(Italy) S Bolelli	3	1
(Portugal) F Gil	6	6
8	(Romania) V Hănescu	4	6	6
(Spain) D Gimeno Traver	6	4	4
Q	(France) N Devilder	3	3
(Germany) M Berrer	6	6
Q	(Spain) S Gutiérrez-Ferrol	1	6^{5}
Q	(Russia) A Kuznetsov	6	7^{7}

Second round
5	(Italy) P Starace	6	6
(Spain) R Ramírez Hidalgo	4	3
(Portugal) F Gil	3	4
3	(France) G Simon	6	6
8	(Romania) V Hănescu	6	7^{7}
(Germany) M Berrer	4	6^{4}
Q	(Russia) A Kuznetsov	6	4	6
2/WC	(Cyprus) M Baghdatis	4	6	4

Quarterfinals
5	(Italy) P Starace	6	3	6
3	(France) G Simon	4	6	4
8	(Romania) V Hănescu	6^{1}	7	6
Q	(Russia) A Kuznetsov	7	5	2

Semifinals
5	(Italy) P Starace	6	6^{3}	7^{7}
8	(Romania) V Hănescu	1	7^{7}	6^{2}
