= 2011 Grand Prix Hassan II – Doubles =

Doubles
- 2011 Grand Prix Hassan II

Final
- Champions: (Sweden) Robert Lindstedt (Romania) Horia Tecău
- Runners-up: (United Kingdom) Colin Fleming (Slovakia) Igor Zelenay
- Score: 6–2, 6–1

Events
Singles	Doubles
← 2010 ·	Grand Prix Hassan II	· 2012 →

Robert Lindstedt and Horia Tecău successfully defended their title after defeating Colin Fleming and Igor Zelenay 6–2, 6–1 in the final.

== Seeds ==
1. (Sweden) Robert Lindstedt / (Romania) Horia Tecău (champions)
2. (Australia) Paul Hanley / (Brazil) Bruno Soares (second round)
3. (Sweden) Simon Aspelin / (Austria) Julian Knowle (first round)
4. (Italy) Daniele Bracciali / (Italy) Potito Starace (first round)

== Draw ==
=== Key ===
- Q = Qualifier
- WC = Wild card
- LL = Lucky loser
- Alt = Alternate
- SE = Special exempt
- PR = Protected ranking
- ITF = ITF entry
- JE = Junior exempt
- w/o = Walkover
- r = Retired
- d = Defaulted
- SR = Special ranking

=== Draw ===
First round
1	(Sweden) R Lindstedt (Romania) H Tecău	6	5	[10]
(Russia) M Elgin (Kazakhstan) A Golubev	2	7	[5]
(Spain) P Andújar (Spain) D Gimeno-Traver	5	2
(Germany) M Kohlmann (Spain) S Ventura	7	6
4	(Italy) D Bracciali (Italy) P Starace	6	1	[7]
(Kazakhstan) M Kukushkin (Italy) F Volandri	2	6	[10]
(Italy) F Fognini (Spain) P Riba	6	6
WC	(Morocco) R El Amrani (Morocco) A Fattar	1	3
WC	(Spain) A Montañés (Spain) F Montañés	1	4
(Spain) D Marrero (Spain) R Ramírez Hidalgo	6	6
(Germany) C Kas (Austria) A Peya	4
3	(Sweden) S Aspelin (Austria) J Knowle	4^{r}
(United States) T Parrott (Slovakia) F Polášek	6^{4}	7	[7]
(United Kingdom) C Fleming (Slovakia) I Zelenay	7^{7}	5	[10]
(Czech Republic) L Friedl (Netherlands) R Wassen	4	4
2	(Australia) P Hanley (Brazil) B Soares	6	6

Quarterfinals
1	(Sweden) R Lindstedt (Romania) H Tecău	6	6
(Germany) M Kohlmann (Spain) S Ventura	4	4
(Kazakhstan) M Kukushkin (Italy) F Volandri	2	2
(Italy) F Fognini (Spain) P Riba	6	6
(Spain) D Marrero (Spain) R Ramírez Hidalgo	5	5
(Germany) C Kas (Austria) A Peya	7	7
(United Kingdom) C Fleming (Slovakia) I Zelenay	6^{9}	6	[10]
2	(Australia) P Hanley (Brazil) B Soares	7^{11}	4	[4]

Semifinals
1	(Sweden) R Lindstedt (Romania) H Tecău	6	6
(Italy) F Fognini (Spain) P Riba	2	1
(Germany) C Kas (Austria) A Peya	6^{5}	4
(United Kingdom) C Fleming (Slovakia) I Zelenay	7^{7}	6

Final
1	(Sweden) R Lindstedt (Romania) H Tecău	6	6
(United Kingdom) C Fleming (Slovakia) I Zelenay	2	1
