= 2012 Mutua Madrid Open – Men's doubles =

Men's doubles
- 2012 Mutua Madrid Open

Final
- Champions: (Poland) Mariusz Fyrstenberg; (Poland) Marcin Matkowski
- Runners-up: (Sweden) Robert Lindstedt; (Romania) Horia Tecău
- Score: 6–3, 6–4

Events
Singles	men	women
Doubles	men	women
- Mutua Madrid Open

Bob Bryan and Mike Bryan were the defending champions but lost in the second round to Aisam-ul-Haq Qureshi and Jean-Julien Rojer. Mariusz Fyrstenberg and Marcin Matkowski won the tournament defeating Robert Lindstedt and Horia Tecău 6–3, 6–4 in the final.

== Seeds ==
The top eight seeds receive a bye into the second round.

1. (United States) Bob Bryan / (United States) Mike Bryan (second round)
2. (Belarus) Max Mirnyi / (Canada) Daniel Nestor (semifinals)
3. (France) Michaël Llodra / (Serbia) Nenad Zimonjić (second round)
4. (Poland) Mariusz Fyrstenberg / (Poland) Marcin Matkowski (champions)
5. (India) Leander Paes / (Czech Republic) Radek Štěpánek (quarterfinals)
6. (Sweden) Robert Lindstedt / (Romania) Horia Tecău (final)
7. (India) Mahesh Bhupathi / (India) Rohan Bopanna (semifinals)
8. (Austria) Jürgen Melzer / (Germany) Philipp Petzschner (second round)

== Draw ==
Key

- Q = Qualifier
- WC = Wild card
- LL = Lucky loser
- Alt = Alternate
- ITF = ITF entry
- PR = Protected ranking
- SR = Special ranking
- SE = Special exempt
- JE = Junior exempt
- JR = Junior Accelerator Programme entrant
- CO = College Accelerator Programme entrant
- NG = Next Gen Accelerator Program entrant
- w/o = Walkover
- r = Retired
- d = Defaulted

=== Finals ===
Semifinals

Final

7
- (India) Mahesh Bhupathi
- (India) Rohan Bopanna
4
6
[7]

6
- (Sweden) Robert Lindstedt
- (Romania) Horia Tecău
6
1
[10]

6
- (Sweden) Robert Lindstedt
- (Romania) Horia Tecău
3
4

4
- (Poland) Mariusz Fyrstenberg
- (Poland) Marcin Matkowski
6
6

4
- (Poland) Mariusz Fyrstenberg
- (Poland) Marcin Matkowski
6^{3}
7^{8}
[12]

2
- (Belarus) Max Mirnyi
- (Canada) Daniel Nestor
7^{7}
6^{6}
[10]

=== Top half ===
First round

Second round

Quarterfinals

Semifinals

1
- (United States) B Bryan
- (United States) M Bryan
6
4
[16]

- (Pakistan) A-u-H Qureshi
- (Netherlands) J-J Rojer
6
7

- (Pakistan) A-u-H Qureshi
- (Netherlands) J-J Rojer
4
6
[18]

WC
- (Spain) D Gimeno Traver
- (Spain) I Navarro
3
5

- (Pakistan) A-u-H Qureshi
- (Netherlands) J-J Rojer
6^{2}
6^{5}

- (Mexico) S González
- (Germany) C Kas
3
6
[10]

7
- (India) M Bhupathi
- (India) R Bopanna
7^{7}
7^{7}

- (Austria) O Marach
- (Austria) A Peya
6
4
[8]

- (Mexico) S González
- (Germany) C Kas
1
6^{2}

7
- (India) M Bhupathi
- (India) R Bopanna
6
7^{7}

7
- (India) M Bhupathi
- (India) R Bopanna
4
6
[7]

6
- (Sweden) R Lindstedt
- (Romania) H Tecău
6
1
[10]

3
- (France) M Llodra
- (Serbia) N Zimonjić
4
4

- (Canada) M Raonic
- (Serbia) V Troicki
4
4

- (Spain) M Granollers
- (Spain) M López
6
6

- (Spain) M Granollers
- (Spain) M López
6
6

- (Spain) M Granollers
- (Spain) M López
5
6^{5}

- (Spain) N Almagro
- (Spain) A Ramos
3
2

6
- (Sweden) R Lindstedt
- (Romania) H Tecău
7
7^{7}

- (Czech Republic) F Čermák
- (Slovakia) F Polášek
6
6

- (Czech Republic) F Čermák
- (Slovakia) F Polášek
6
6^{7}
[7]

6
- (Sweden) R Lindstedt
- (Romania) H Tecău
4
7^{9}
[10]

=== Bottom half ===
First round

Second round

Quarterfinals

Semifinals

8
- (Austria) J Melzer
- (Germany) P Petzschner
6^{1}
3

Alt
- (Russia) A Bogomolov
- (Italy) F Fognini
4
1

- (Croatia) M Čilić
- (Brazil) M Melo
7^{7}
6

- (Croatia) M Čilić
- (Brazil) M Melo
6
6

- (Croatia) M Čilić
- (Brazil) M Melo
5
2

- (Colombia) JS Cabal
- (Argentina) E Schwank
6
7^{7}

4
- (Poland) M Fyrstenberg
- (Poland) M Matkowski
7
6

- (South Africa) K Anderson
- (United States) J Isner
4
6^{4}

- (Colombia) JS Cabal
- (Argentina) E Schwank
3
6^{5}

4
- (Poland) M Fyrstenberg
- (Poland) M Matkowski
6
7^{7}

4
- (Poland) M Fyrstenberg
- (Poland) M Matkowski
6^{3}
7^{7}
[12]

2
- (Belarus) M Mirnyi
- (Canada) D Nestor
7^{7}
6^{5}
[10]

5
- (India) L Paes
- (Czech Republic) R Štěpánek
6
6

- (France) R Gasquet
- (France) G Monfils
7^{8}
6

- (France) R Gasquet
- (France) G Monfils
3
4

WC
- (Ukraine) S Bubka
- (Spain) J Martí
6^{6}
2

5
- (India) L Paes
- (Czech Republic) R Štěpánek
3
7^{7}
[2]

- (Spain) D Marrero
- (Spain) F Verdasco
4
7
[12]

2
- (Belarus) M Mirnyi
- (Canada) D Nestor
6
6^{2}
[10]

- (Ukraine) A Dolgopolov
- (France) J-W Tsonga
6
5
[10]

- (Spain) D Marrero
- (Spain) F Verdasco
3
6^{4}

2
- (Belarus) M Mirnyi
- (Canada) D Nestor
6
7^{7}
