= Horia Tecău =

Romanian tennis player

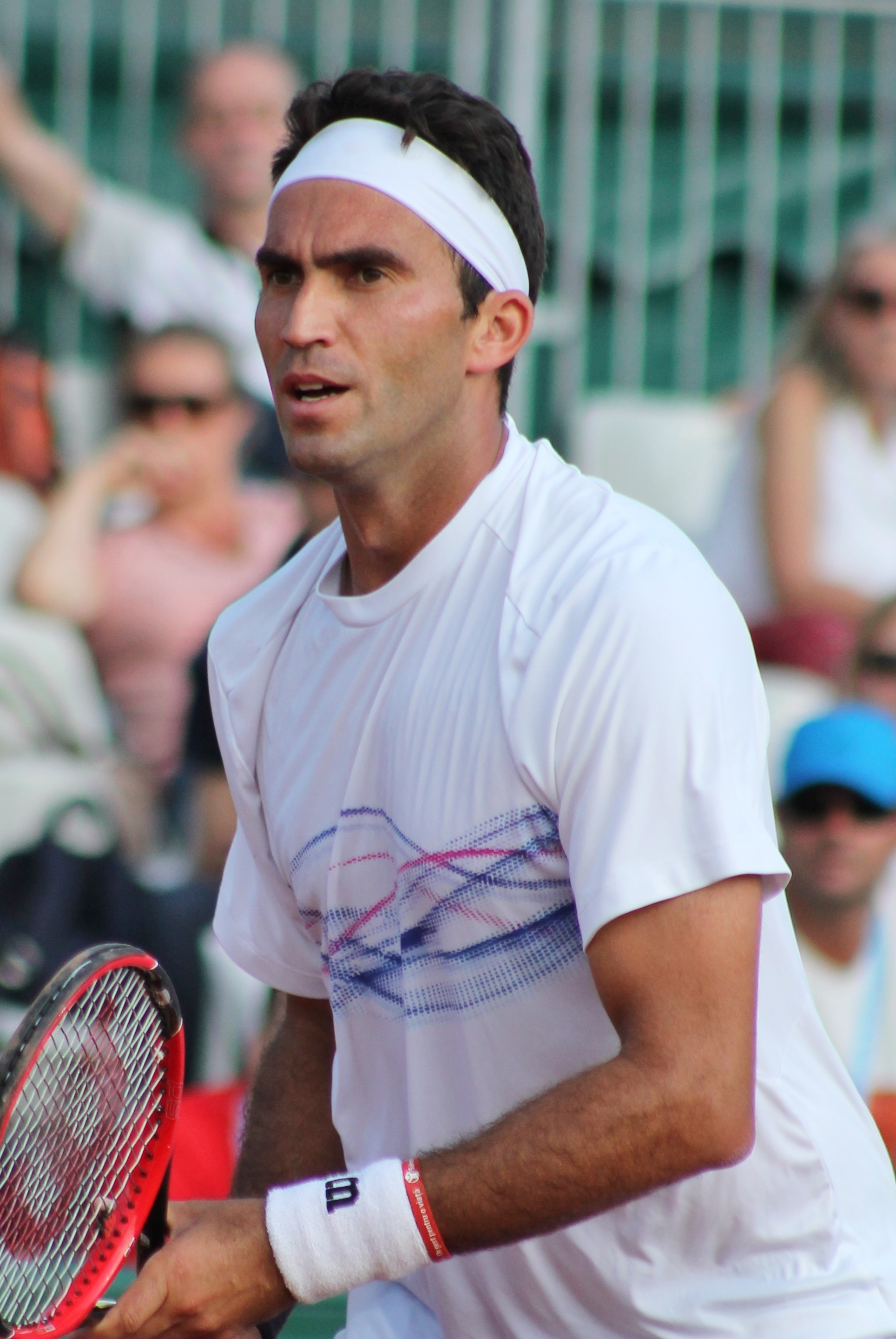
- Horia Tecău at the 2016 French Open
- Country (sports): Romania
- Residence: Constanța, Romania
- Born: January 19, 1985 (age 41) Constanța, Romania
- Height: 1.93 m (6 ft 4 in)
- Turned pro: 2003
- Retired: 2022
- Plays: Right-handed (two-handed backhand)
- Prize money: US$5,882,695

Singles
- Career record: 0–3
- Career titles: 0
- Highest ranking: No. 326 (4 April 2005)

Doubles
- Career record: 473–286
- Career titles: 38
- Highest ranking: No. 2 (23 November 2015)

Grand Slam doubles results
- Australian Open: SF (2012, 2015)
- French Open: SF (2015)
- Wimbledon: W (2015)
- US Open: W (2017)

Other doubles tournaments
- Tour Finals: W (2015)

Mixed doubles
- Career titles: 1

Grand Slam mixed doubles results
- Australian Open: W (2012)
- French Open: SF (2015)
- Wimbledon: QF (2013, 2015)
- US Open: SF (2017)
Medal record
Representing Romania
Men's Tennis
Silver medal – second place	2016 Rio de Janeiro	Doubles

Horia Tecău (Romanian pronunciation: [ˈhori.a teˈkəw]; born January 19, 1985) is a Romanian former professional tennis player who specialised in doubles.

He is a three-time Grand Slam champion, having won the 2015 Wimbledon Championships and 2017 US Open alongside Jean-Julien Rojer in men's doubles, as well as the 2012 Australian Open with Bethanie Mattek-Sands in mixed doubles. Tecău also reached five further Grand Slam finals: at the 2010, 2011 and 2012 Wimbledon Championships with Robert Lindstedt in men's doubles, and at the 2014 and 2016 Australian Opens in mixed doubles.

He reached his career-high doubles ranking of world No. 2 in November 2015, shortly before winning the 2015 ATP Finals with Rojer. Tecău won 38 doubles and one mixed doubles titles on the ATP Tour, including three at Masters 1000 level. He also won the silver medal at the 2016 Olympic Games in Rio de Janeiro, alongside compatriot Florin Mergea.

== Career ==
=== 2010 ===
On January 16, 2010, Tecău won his first ATP doubles title at the Auckland Open, partnering Marcus Daniell.

He showed strong form in early 2010 and won two doubles titles, (one Challenger and one ATP World Tour 250 Series), at Marrakech and Casablanca, which confirmed his good form.

He won his third doubles title at 's-Hertogenbosch and his second with partner Robert Lindstedt (his first with him came in Casablanca).

At Wimbledon, Tecău reached, for the first time in his career, a Grand Slam doubles final. He and his partner, Robert Lindstedt, defeated the pair of Tommy Robredo and Marcel Granollers in four sets in the quarterfinals and in the semifinals the duo of Juan Ignacio Chela and Eduardo Schwank. In the final, Tecău and Lindstedt were defeated by the pair of Jürgen Melzer and Philipp Petzschner.

At Wimbledon in the mixed doubles, he and his partner, fellow Romanian Monica Niculescu, lost in the second round to Marcelo Melo and Rennae Stubbs.

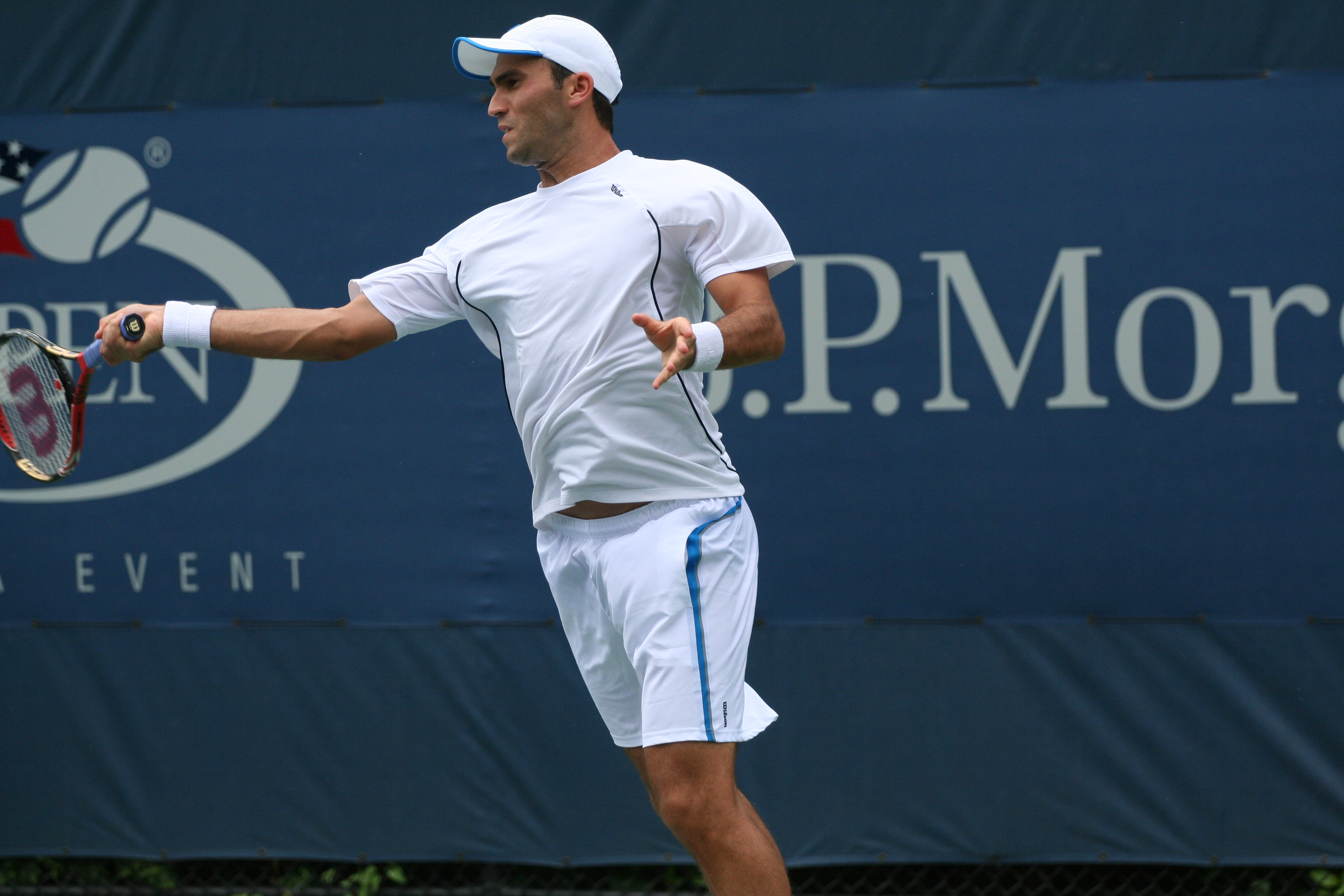
Horia Tecău at the 2010 US Open

At the Swedish Open, Lindstedt and Tecău won their third title together winning the final against Andreas Seppi and Simone Vagnozzi.

At the Los Angeles Open, Tecău and Lindstedt were defeated by Eric Butorac and Jean-Julien Rojer in the quarterfinals. At the Washington Open, they were defeated by the pair of Marcos Baghdatis and Stanislas Wawrinka in the first round.

The fifth title of Tecău's career and fourth partnering Lindstedt came at the Connecticut Open. The final saw them beating Rohan Bopanna and Aisam-ul-Haq Qureshi, this being their second title win against the Indian-Pakistani pair.

=== 2011 ===
Horia started season alongside his partner Lindstedt at the Brisbane International. They had a good start and reached the final of the tournament but a calf injury of Lindstedt forced them to retire after just one set and thus losing the match to the Lukáš Dlouhý/Paul Hanley pair. At the Auckland Open, Horia was the defending champion and seeded No. 1 with Robert but they were forced to withdraw due to the Swede's left calf injury sustained just days earlier.

At the Australian Open Horia and Robert were eleventh seed but despite leading 1–0 in the first round match against wildcards Colin Ebelthite and Adam Feeney they were forced to retire yet again due to Robert's injury.

After the year's first Grand Slam, Horia decided to give his partner, Robert, time to recover and paired with experienced doubles player, Belgian Dick Norman, for the Zagreb Indoors. This was a successful choice and they reached the tournament final and won it.

Following the Zagreb title, Horia paired for the next two tournaments with Austrian Julian Knowle and Pakistani Aisam-ul-Haq Qureshi but with little success, exiting both competitions after the first round. He then paired with fellow countryman Victor Hănescu for their biggest doubles title to date, the 500 point Mexican Open. In the final, they beat Brazilians Marcelo Melo and Bruno Soares in straight sets.

In April, Horia and Lindstedt defended their title in Casablanca, after an impressive display and losing just one set in the first round of the tournament.

He had a good grass-court season with two finals together with Lindstedt, losing in the final of Wimbledon to the Bryan twins.

At the return to clay, he defended his win at Swedish Open, again with Lindstedt.

=== 2012: Masters 1000 doubles title, end of doubles relationship with Lindstedt ===
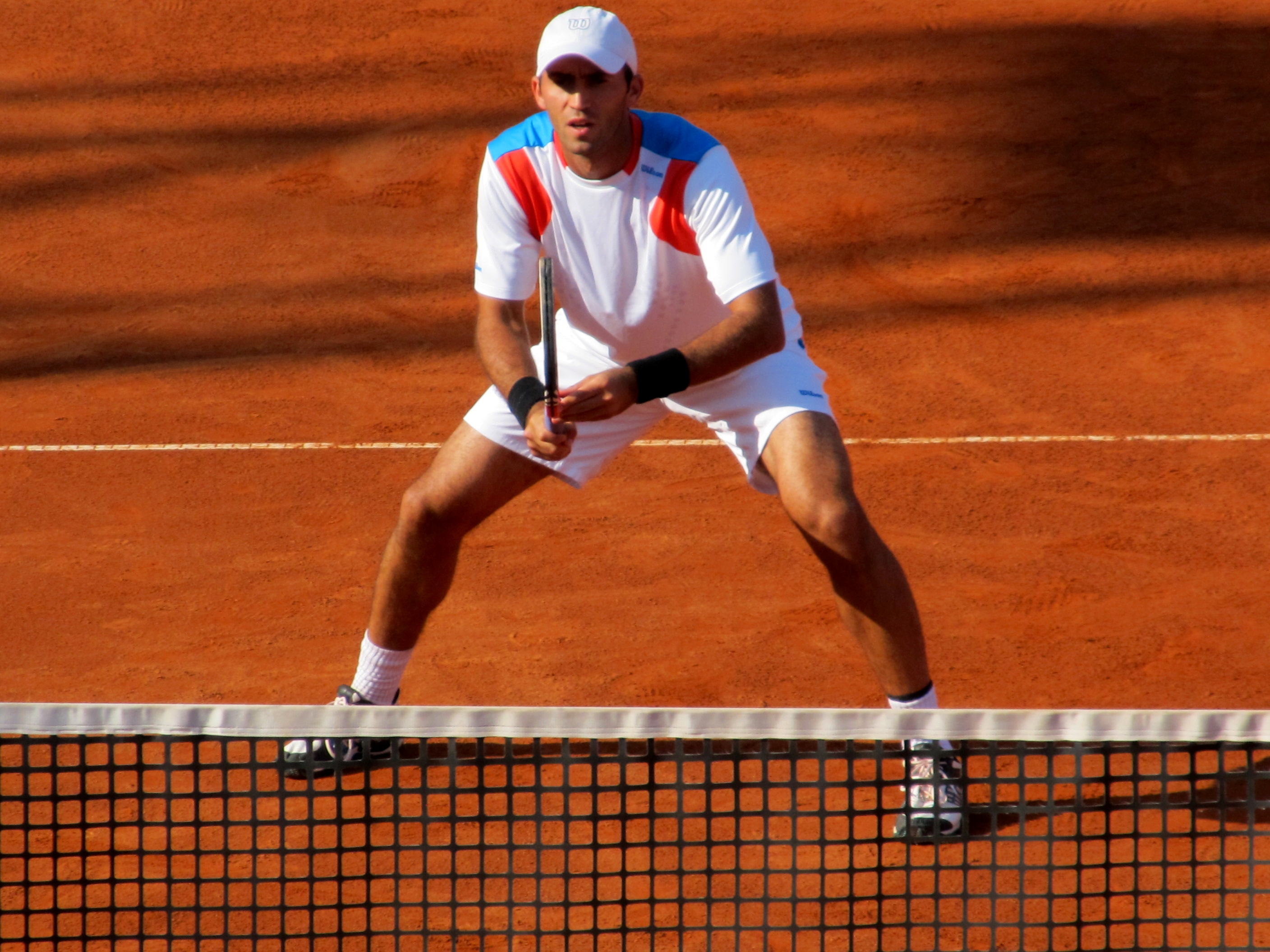
Tecău playing at the 2012 Romanian Open

Tecău and Bethanie Mattek-Sands won the Australian Open mixed-doubles final on 29 January. He reached the semifinals in men's doubles with Lindstedt and lost to Bob and Mike Bryan in a close three-setter. Together they also reached the final of a Masters 1000 for the first time at the 2012 Mutua Madrid Open.

At the Summer Olympics, Tecău and teammate Adrian Ungur lost in the first round.

In August 2012, Tecău and Lindstedt won the biggest title together, the Masters 1000 title at the 2012 Western & Southern Open in Cincinnati.

Tecău and Lindstedt separated in September 2012 after a fruitful three-year relationship where they won a total of 10 titles.

=== 2013: Three more doubles titles with Mirnyi ===
Tecău paired up with Max Mirnyi for 2013. They reached five finals and won three of them.

=== 2014–2019: Two Grand Slam doubles titles, world No. 2, Olympic Silver ===
Tecău and his partner Jean-Julien Rojer won 2015 Wimbledon defeating Jamie Murray and John Peers in the final and the 2017 US Open defeating Feliciano López and Marc López in the final.

He won the 2016 BRD Năstase Țiriac Trophy and the silver medal at the 2016 Olympic Games in Rio de Janeiro with Florin Mergea.

=== 2020–2022: Major doubles semifinal, an ATP title, and retirement ===
He qualified with his new partner German Kevin Krawietz on 4 November 2021 for the 2021 ATP Finals with whom he won his 38th title in Halle. Tecău played his last match at the 2021 ATP Finals before his retirement. However he postponed his retirement when he was called back to play doubles in the 2022 Davis Cup with Marius Copil where they won their match against Spain duo Alejandro Davidovich Fokina and Pedro Martínez (tennis). He was announced as the Billie Jean King Cup captain for Romania in March 2022.

== Personal life ==
Tecău was chosen by Sony Pictures to dub Charles Darwin's voice in Romanian in the animated movie The Pirates! In an Adventure with Scientists!.

== Significant finals ==
=== Grand Slam finals ===
==== Doubles: 5 (2 titles, 3 runner-ups) ====
Result	Year	Championship	Surface	Partner	Opponents	Score
Loss	2010	Wimbledon	Grass	(Sweden) Robert Lindstedt	(Austria) Jürgen Melzer (Germany) Philipp Petzschner	1–6, 5–7, 5–7
Loss	2011	Wimbledon	Grass	(Sweden) Robert Lindstedt	(United States) Bob Bryan (United States) Mike Bryan	3–6, 4–6, 6–7^{(2–7)}
Loss	2012	Wimbledon	Grass	(Sweden) Robert Lindstedt	(United Kingdom) Jonathan Marray (Denmark) Frederik Nielsen	6–4, 4–6, 6–7^{(5–7)}, 7–6^{(7–5)}, 3–6
Win	2015	Wimbledon	Grass	(Netherlands) Jean-Julien Rojer	(United Kingdom) Jamie Murray (Australia) John Peers	7–6^{(7–5)}, 6–4, 6–4
Win	2017	US Open	Hard	(Netherlands) Jean-Julien Rojer	(Spain) Feliciano López (Spain) Marc López	6–4, 6–3

==== Mixed doubles: 3 (1 title, 2 runner-ups) ====
Result	Year	Championship	Surface	Partner	Opponents	Score
Win	2012	Australian Open	Hard	(United States) Bethanie Mattek-Sands	(Russia) Elena Vesnina (India) Leander Paes	6–3, 5–7, [10–3]
Loss	2014	Australian Open	Hard	(India) Sania Mirza	(France) Kristina Mladenovic (Canada) Daniel Nestor	3–6, 2–6
Loss	2016	Australian Open	Hard	(United States) CoCo Vandeweghe	(Russia) Elena Vesnina (Brazil) Bruno Soares	4–6, 6–4, [5–10]

=== Year-end championships ===
==== Doubles: 1 (1 title) ====
Result	Year	Championship	Surface	Partner	Opponents	Score
Win	2015	ATP World Tour Finals, London	Hard (i)	(Netherlands) Jean-Julien Rojer	(India) Rohan Bopanna (Romania) Florin Mergea	6–4, 6–3

=== Masters 1000 finals ===
==== Doubles: 6 (3 titles, 3 runner-ups) ====
Result	Year	Tournament	Surface	Partner	Opponents	Score
Loss	2012	Madrid Open	Clay	(Sweden) Robert Lindstedt	(Poland) Mariusz Fyrstenberg (Poland) Marcin Matkowski	3–6, 4–6
Win	2012	Cincinnati Masters	Hard	(Sweden) Robert Lindstedt	(India) Mahesh Bhupathi (India) Rohan Bopanna	6–4, 6–4
Win	2016	Madrid Open	Clay	(Netherlands) Jean-Julien Rojer	(India) Rohan Bopanna (Romania) Florin Mergea	6–4, 7–6 ^{7–5}
Loss	2016	Cincinnati Masters	Hard	(Netherlands) Jean-Julien Rojer	(Croatia) Ivan Dodig (Brazil) Marcelo Melo	6–7^{(5–7)}, 7–6^{(7–5)}, [6–10]
Loss	2018	Paris Masters	Hard (i)	(Netherlands) Jean-Julien Rojer	(Spain) Marcel Granollers (United States) Rajeev Ram	4–6, 4–6
Win	2019	Madrid Open	Clay	(Netherlands) Jean-Julien Rojer	(Argentina) Diego Schwartzman (Austria) Dominic Thiem	6–2, 6–3

=== Olympic medal matches ===
==== Doubles: 1 (silver medal) ====
Outcome	Year	Championship	Surface	Partner	Opponents	Score
Silver	2016	Summer Olympics, Rio de Janeiro	Hard	(Romania) Florin Mergea	(Spain) Marc López (Spain) Rafael Nadal	2–6, 6–3, 4–6

== ATP career finals ==
=== Doubles: 62 (38 titles, 24 runner-ups) ===
Legend Grand Slam tournaments (2–3) ATP World Tour Finals (1–0) ATP World Tour Masters 1000 (3–3) Olympic Games (0–1) ATP World Tour 500 Series (10–9) ATP World Tour 250 Series (22–8)	Finals by surface Hard (18–14) Clay (14–6) Grass (6–4)	Finals by setting Outdoor (32–19) Indoor (6–5)

Result	W–L	Date	Tournament	Tier	Surface	Partner	Opponents	Score
Loss	0–1	May 2009	Austrian Open Kitzbühel	250 Series	Clay	(Romania) Andrei Pavel	(Brazil) Marcelo Melo (Brazil) André Sá	7–6^{(11–9)}, 2–6, [7–10]
Loss	0–2	Jul 2009	Stuttgart Open, Germany	250 Series	Clay	(Romania) Victor Hănescu	(Czech Republic) František Čermák (Slovakia) Michal Mertiňák	5–7, 4–6
Win	1–2	Jan 2010	Auckland Open, New Zealand	250 Series	Hard	(New Zealand) Marcus Daniell	(Brazil) Marcelo Melo (Brazil) Bruno Soares	7–5, 6–4
Win	2–2	Apr 2010	Grand Prix Hassan II, Morocco	250 Series	Clay	(Sweden) Robert Lindstedt	(India) Rohan Bopanna (Pakistan) Aisam-ul-Haq Qureshi	6–2, 3–6, [10–7]
Win	3–2	Jun 2010	Rosmalen Grass Court Championships, Netherlands	250 Series	Grass	(Sweden) Robert Lindstedt	(Czech Republic) Lukáš Dlouhý (India) Leander Paes	1–6, 7–5, [10–7]
Loss	3–3	Jul 2010	Wimbledon, United Kingdom	Grand Slam	Grass	(Sweden) Robert Lindstedt	(Austria) Jürgen Melzer (Germany) Philipp Petzschner	1–6, 5–7, 5–7
Win	4–3	Jul 2010	Swedish Open, Sweden	250 Series	Clay	(Sweden) Robert Lindstedt	(Italy) Andreas Seppi (Italy) Simone Vagnozzi	6–4, 7–5
Win	5–3	Aug 2010	New Haven Open, United States	250 Series	Hard	(Sweden) Robert Lindstedt	(India) Rohan Bopanna (Pakistan) Aisam-ul-Haq Qureshi	6–4, 7–5
Loss	5–4	Jan 2011	Brisbane International, Australia	250 Series	Hard	(Sweden) Robert Lindstedt	(Czech Republic) Lukáš Dlouhý (Australia) Paul Hanley	4–6, ret.
Win	6–4	Feb 2011	Zagreb Indoors, Croatia	250 Series	Hard (i)	(Belgium) Dick Norman	(Spain) Marcel Granollers (Spain) Marc López	6–3, 6–4
Win	7–4	Feb 2011	Mexican Open, Mexico	500 Series	Clay	(Romania) Victor Hănescu	(Brazil) Marcelo Melo (Brazil) Bruno Soares	6–1, 6–3
Win	8–4	Apr 2011	Grand Prix Hassan II, Morocco (2)	250 Series	Clay	(Sweden) Robert Lindstedt	(United Kingdom) Colin Fleming (Slovakia) Igor Zelenay	6–2, 6–1
Loss	8–5	Jun 2011	Rosmalen Grass Court Championships, Netherlands	250 Series	Grass	(Sweden) Robert Lindstedt	(Italy) Daniele Bracciali (Czech Republic) František Čermák	3–6, 6–2, [8–10]
Loss	8–6	Jul 2011	Wimbledon, United Kingdom (2)	Grand Slam	Grass	(Sweden) Robert Lindstedt	(United States) Bob Bryan (United States) Mike Bryan	3–6, 4–6, 6–7^{(3–7)}
Win	9–6	Jul 2011	Swedish Open, Sweden (2)	250 Series	Clay	(Sweden) Robert Lindstedt	(Sweden) Simon Aspelin (Sweden) Andreas Siljeström	6–3, 6–3
Loss	9–7	Aug 2011	Washington Open, United States	500 Series	Hard	(Sweden) Robert Lindstedt	(France) Michaël Llodra (Serbia) Nenad Zimonjić	7–6^{(7–3)}, 6–7^{(6–8)}, [7–10]
Loss	9–8	Oct 2011	China Open, China	500 Series	Hard	(Sweden) Robert Lindstedt	(France) Michaël Llodra (Serbia) Nenad Zimonjić	6–7^{(2–7)}, 6–7^{(4–7)}
Loss	9–9	Feb 2012	Rotterdam Open, Netherlands	500 Series	Hard (i)	(Sweden) Robert Lindstedt	(France) Michaël Llodra (Serbia) Nenad Zimonjić	6–4, 5–7, [14–16]
Win	10–9	Apr 2012	Romanian Open, Romania	250 Series	Clay	(Sweden) Robert Lindstedt	(France) Jérémy Chardy (Poland) Łukasz Kubot	7–6^{(7–2)}, 6–3
Loss	10–10	May 2012	Madrid Open, Spain	Masters 1000	Clay	(Sweden) Robert Lindstedt	(Poland) Mariusz Fyrstenberg (Poland) Marcin Matkowski	3–6, 4–6
Win	11–10	Jun 2012	Rosmalen Grass Court Championships, Netherlands (2)	250 Series	Grass	(Sweden) Robert Lindstedt	(Colombia) Juan Sebastián Cabal (Russia) Dmitry Tursunov	6–3, 7–6^{(7–1)}
Loss	11–11	Jul 2012	Wimbledon, United Kingdom (3)	Grand Slam	Grass	(Sweden) Robert Lindstedt	(United Kingdom) Jonathan Marray (Denmark) Frederik Nielsen	6–4, 4–6, 6–7^{(5–7)}, 7–6^{(7–5)}, 3–6
Win	12–11	Jul 2012	Swedish Open, Sweden (3)	250 Series	Clay	(Sweden) Robert Lindstedt	(Austria) Alexander Peya (Brazil) Bruno Soares	6–3, 7–6^{(7–5)}
Win	13–11	Aug 2012	Cincinnati Masters, United States	Masters 1000	Hard	(Sweden) Robert Lindstedt	(India) Mahesh Bhupathi (India) Rohan Bopanna	6–4, 6–4
Loss	13–12	Jan 2013	Sydney International, Australia	250 Series	Hard	(Belarus) Max Mirnyi	(United States) Bob Bryan (United States) Mike Bryan	4–6, 4–6
Loss	13–13	Mar 2013	Delray Beach Open, United States	250 Series	Hard	(Belarus) Max Mirnyi	(United States) James Blake (United States) Jack Sock	4–6, 4–6
Win	14–13	Apr 2013	Romanian Open, Romania (2)	250 Series	Clay	(Belarus) Max Mirnyi	(Czech Republic) Lukáš Dlouhý (Austria) Oliver Marach	4–6, 6–4, [10–6]
Win	15–13	Jun 2013	Rosmalen Grass Court Championships, Netherlands (3)	250 Series	Grass	(Belarus) Max Mirnyi	(Germany) Andre Begemann (Germany) Martin Emmrich	6–3, 7–6^{(7–4)}
Win	16–13	Oct 2013	China Open, China	500 Series	Hard	(Belarus) Max Mirnyi	(Italy) Fabio Fognini (Italy) Andreas Seppi	6–4, 6–2
Win	17–13	Feb 2014	Zagreb Indoors, Croatia (2)	250 Series	Hard (i)	(Netherlands) Jean-Julien Rojer	(Germany) Philipp Marx (Slovakia) Michal Mertiňák	3–6, 6–4, [10–2]
Loss	17–14	Feb 2014	Rotterdam Open, Netherlands (2)	500 Series	Hard (i)	(Netherlands) Jean-Julien Rojer	(France) Michaël Llodra (France) Nicolas Mahut	2–6, 6–7^{(7–4)}
Win	18–14	Apr 2014	Grand Prix Hassan II, Morocco (3)	250 Series	Clay	(Netherlands) Jean-Julien Rojer	(Poland) Tomasz Bednarek (Czech Republic) Lukáš Dlouhý	6–2, 6–2
Win	19–14	Apr 2014	Romanian Open, Romania (3)	250 Series	Clay	(Netherlands) Jean-Julien Rojer	(Poland) Mariusz Fyrstenberg (Poland) Marcin Matkowski	6–4, 6–4
Win	20–14	Jun 2014	Rosmalen Grass Court Championships, Netherlands (4)	250 Series	Grass	(Netherlands) Jean-Julien Rojer	(United States) Scott Lipsky (Mexico) Santiago González	6–3, 7–6^{(7–3)}
Win	21–14	Aug 2014	Washington Open, United States	500 Series	Hard	(Netherlands) Jean-Julien Rojer	(Australia) Sam Groth (India) Leander Paes	7–5, 6–4
Win	22–14	Sep 2014	Shenzhen Open, China	250 Series	Hard	(Netherlands) Jean-Julien Rojer	(Australia) Chris Guccione (Australia) Sam Groth	6–4, 7–6^{(7–4)}
Win	23–14	Oct 2014	China Open, China (2)	500 Series	Hard	(Netherlands) Jean-Julien Rojer	(France) Julien Benneteau (Canada) Vasek Pospisil	6–7^{(6–8)}, 7–5, [10–5]
Win	24–14	Oct 2014	Valencia Open, Spain	500 Series	Hard (i)	(Netherlands) Jean-Julien Rojer	(South Africa) Kevin Anderson (France) Jérémy Chardy	6–4, 6–2
Loss	24–15	Jan 2015	Sydney International, Australia (2)	250 Series	Hard	(Netherlands) Jean-Julien Rojer	(India) Rohan Bopanna (Canada) Daniel Nestor	4–6, 6–7^{(5–7)}
Win	25–15	Feb 2015	Rotterdam Open, Netherlands	500 Series	Hard (i)	(Netherlands) Jean-Julien Rojer	(United Kingdom) Jamie Murray (Australia) John Peers	3–6, 6–3, [10–8]
Loss	25–16	May 2015	Open de Nice, France	250 Series	Clay	(Netherlands) Jean-Julien Rojer	(Croatia) Mate Pavić (New Zealand) Michael Venus	6–7^{(4–7)}, 6–2, [8–10]
Win	26–16	Jul 2015	Wimbledon, United Kingdom	Grand Slam	Grass	(Netherlands) Jean-Julien Rojer	(United Kingdom) Jamie Murray (Australia) John Peers	7–6^{(7–5)}, 6–4, 6–4
Win	27–16	Nov 2015	ATP World Tour Finals, United Kingdom	Tour Finals	Hard (i)	(Netherlands) Jean-Julien Rojer	(India) Rohan Bopanna (Romania) Florin Mergea	6–4, 6–3
Win	28–16	Apr 2016	Romanian Open, Romania (4)	250 Series	Clay	(Romania) Florin Mergea	(Australia) Chris Guccione (Brazil) André Sá	7–5, 6–4
Win	29–16	May 2016	Madrid Open, Spain	Masters 1000	Clay	(Netherlands) Jean-Julien Rojer	(India) Rohan Bopanna (Romania) Florin Mergea	6–4, 6–3
Loss	29–17	Aug 2016	Rio Summer Olympics, Brazil	Olympics	Hard	(Romania) Florin Mergea	(Spain) Marc López (Spain) Rafael Nadal	2–6, 6–3, 4–6
Loss	29–18	Aug 2016	Cincinnati Masters, United States	Masters 1000	Hard	(Netherlands) Jean-Julien Rojer	(Croatia) Ivan Dodig (Brazil) Marcelo Melo	6–7^{(5–7)}, 7–6^{(7–5)}, [6–10]
Win	30–18	Mar 2017	Dubai Tennis Championships, UAE	500 Series	Hard	(Netherlands) Jean-Julien Rojer	(India) Rohan Bopanna (Poland) Marcin Matkowski	4–6, 6–3, [10–3]
Win	31–18	May 2017	Geneva Open, Switzerland	250 Series	Clay	(Netherlands) Jean-Julien Rojer	(Colombia) Juan Sebastián Cabal (Colombia) Robert Farah	2–6, 7–6^{(11–9)}, [10–6]
Win	32–18	Aug 2017	Winston-Salem Open, United States	250 Series	Hard	(Netherlands) Jean-Julien Rojer	(Chile) Julio Peralta (Argentina) Horacio Zeballos	6–3, 6–4
Win	33–18	Sep 2017	US Open, United States	Grand Slam	Hard	(Netherlands) Jean-Julien Rojer	(Spain) Feliciano López (Spain) Marc López	6–4, 6–3
Win	34–18	Mar 2018	Dubai Tennis Championships, UAE (2)	500 Series	Hard	(Netherlands) Jean-Julien Rojer	(United States) James Cerretani (India) Leander Paes	6–2, 7–6^{(7–2)}
Win	35-18	Aug 2018	Winston-Salem Open, United States (2)	250 Series	Hard	(Netherlands) Jean-Julien Rojer	(United States) James Cerretani (India) Leander Paes	6–4, 6–2
Loss	35–19	Nov 2018	Paris Masters, France	Masters 1000	Hard (i)	(Netherlands) Jean-Julien Rojer	(Spain) Marcel Granollers (United States) Rajeev Ram	4–6, 4–6
Loss	35–20	Feb 2019	Rotterdam Open, Netherlands	500 Series	Hard (i)	(Netherlands) Jean-Julien Rojer	(France) Jérémy Chardy (Finland) Henri Kontinen	6–7^{(5–7)}, 6–7^{(4–7)}
Win	36–20	May 2019	Madrid Open, Spain	Masters 1000	Clay	(Netherlands) Jean-Julien Rojer	(Argentina) Diego Schwartzman (Austria) Dominic Thiem	6–2, 6–3
Loss	36–21	Aug 2019	Washington Open, United States	500 Series	Hard	(Netherlands) Jean-Julien Rojer	(South Africa) Raven Klaasen (New Zealand) Michael Venus	6–3, 3–6, [2–10]
Win	37–21	Oct 2019	Swiss Indoors, Switzerland	500 Series	Hard (i)	(Netherlands) Jean-Julien Rojer	(United States) Taylor Fritz (United States) Reilly Opelka	7–5, 6–3
Loss	37–22	Mar 2021	Rotterdam Open, Netherlands	500 Series	Hard (i)	(Germany) Kevin Krawietz	(Croatia) Nikola Mektić (Croatia) Mate Pavić	6–7^{(7–9)}, 2–6
Loss	37–23	Apr 2021	Barcelona Open, Spain	500 Series	Clay	(Germany) Kevin Krawietz	(Colombia) Juan Sebastián Cabal (Colombia) Robert Farah	4–6, 2–6
Win	38–23	Jun 2021	Halle Open, Germany	500 Series	Grass	(Germany) Kevin Krawietz	(Canada) Félix Auger-Aliassime (Poland) Hubert Hurkacz	7–6^{(7–4)}, 6–4
Loss	38–24	Jul 2021	Hamburg European Open, Germany	500 Series	Clay	(Germany) Kevin Krawietz	(Germany) Tim Pütz (New Zealand) Michael Venus	3–6, 7–6^{(7–3)}, [8–10]

== Performance timelines ==
Key
W	F	SF	QF	#R	RR	Q#	P#	DNQ	A	Z#	PO	G	S	B	NMS	NTI	P	NH

(W) winner; (F) finalist; (SF) semifinalist; (QF) quarterfinalist; (#R) rounds 4, 3, 2, 1; (RR) round-robin stage; (Q#) qualification round; (P#) preliminary round; (DNQ) did not qualify; (A) absent; (Z#) Davis/Fed Cup Zonal Group (with number indication) or (PO) play-off; (G) gold, (S) silver or (B) bronze Olympic/Paralympic medal; (NMS) not a Masters tournament; (NTI) not a Tier I tournament; (P) postponed; (NH) not held; (SR) strike rate (events won / competed); (W–L) win–loss record.
To avoid confusion and double counting, these charts are updated at the conclusion of a tournament or when the player's participation has ended.

=== Doubles ===
Tournament	2007	2008	2009	2010	2011	2012	2013	2014	2015	2016	2017	2018	2019	2020	2021	!SR	W–L
Grand Slam tournaments
Australian Open	A	A	3R	2R	1R	SF	2R	2R	SF	QF	3R	2R	1R	2R	3R	0 / 13	22–13
French Open	A	2R	2R	1R	QF	2R	2R	3R	SF	2R	3R	A	QF	3R	QF	0 / 13	24–13
Wimbledon	A	Q1	3R	F	F	F	3R	3R	W	1R	1R	A	QF	NH	2R	1 / 11	31–10
US Open	A	2R	2R	3R	QF	3R	1R	3R	QF	3R	W	2R	1R	SF	QF	1 / 14	28–13
Win–loss	0–0	2–2	6–4	8–4	11–4	12–4	4–4	7–4	16–3	6–4	10–3	2–2	6–4	6–3	9–4	2 / 51	105–49
Year-end championships
Tour Finals	Did not qualify				RR	RR	DNQ	RR	W	DNQ	RR	DNQ	RR	DNQ	RR	1 / 7	9–14
National representation
Summer Olympics	NH	A	Not Held			1R	Not Held			F–S	Not Held				A	0 / 2	4–2
ATP Tour Masters 1000
Indian Wells Masters	A	A	A	A	1R	2R	A	1R	1R	1R	QF	2R	QF	NH	QF	0 / 9	8–9
Miami Open	1R	A	A	1R	QF	1R	A	1R	QF	1R	2R	2R	1R	NH	QF	0 / 11	8–11
Monte Carlo Masters	A	A	A	A	2R	2R	QF	1R	2R	2R	2R	A	1R	NH	1R	0 / 9	1–9
Madrid Open^{1}	A	A	A	2R	1R	F	QF	2R	2R	W	1R	A	W	NH	2R	2 / 10	15–8
Italian Open	A	A	A	A	QF	SF	SF	1R	QF	2R	1R	A	1R	1R	QF	0 / 10	9–10
Canadian Open	A	A	A	2R	2R	SF	2R	QF	QF	SF	2R	QF	2R	NH	SF	0 / 11	13–11
Cincinnati Masters	A	A	A	1R	2R	W	2R	QF	QF	F	QF	SF	1R	QF	2R	1 / 12	18–11
Shanghai Masters^{2}	A	A	A	2R	QF	2R	1R	2R	2R	A	SF	2R	2R	NH		0 / 9	6–9
Paris Masters	A	A	A	1R	2R	2R	SF	SF	QF	2R	SF	F	1R	A	2R	0 / 11	12–11
Win–loss	0–1	0–0	0–0	3–6	5–9	12–8	8–7	7–9	6–9	9–7	10–9	10–6	8–8	2–2	10–8	3 / 93	90–89
Year-end ranking	175	87	46	19	12	9	23	16	2	19	8	27	19	22	17	$5,882,695	

^{1} Held as Hamburg Masters (outdoor clay) until 2008, Madrid Masters (outdoor clay) 2009 – present.
^{2} Held as Stuttgart Masters (indoor hard) until 2001, Madrid Masters (indoor hard) from 2002 to 2008, and Shanghai Masters (outdoor hard) 2009 – present.

=== Mixed doubles ===
Tournament	2010	2011	2012	2013	2014	2015	2016	2017	2018	2019	2020	2021	SR	W–L	Win%
Grand Slam tournaments
Australian Open	A	SF	W	1R	F	1R	F	2R	A	1R	A	A	1 / 8	17–7	71%
French Open	1R	2R	2R	2R	2R	SF	1R	A	A	A	NH	A	0 / 7	7–7	50%
Wimbledon	2R	A	1R	QF	2R	QF	2R	A	A	A	NH	A	0 / 6	6–6	50%
US Open	1R	1R	1R	1R	1R	QF	A	SF	A	A	NH	A	0 / 7	5–7	42%
Win–loss	1–3	4–3	6–3	3–4	6–4	7–4	4–3	4–2	0–0	0–1	0–0	0–0	1 / 28	35–27	56%

== ATP Challenger and ITF Futures finals ==
=== Singles: 6 (5 titles, 1 runner-up) ===
Legend ATP Challenger Tour (0–0) ITF Futures Tour (5–1)	Finals by surface Hard (4–1) Clay (0–0) Grass (1–0) Carpet (0–0)

Result	W–L	Date	Tournament	Tier	Surface	Opponent	Score
Win	1–0	May 2004	Saudi Arabia F1, Riyadh	Futures	Hard	(Germany) Torsten Popp	6–4, 2–6, 6–3
Win	2–0	Oct 2004	United States F27, Laguna Beach	Futures	Hard	(United States) Wayne Odesnik	6–3, 6–2
Win	3–0	Nov 2004	United States F31, Hawaii	Futures	Hard	(United States) Wayne Odesnik	6–4, 6–4
Win	4–0	Jan 2005	United States F3, Key Biscayne	Futures	Hard	(Ghana) Henry Adjei-Darko	6–3, 6–7^{(13–15)}, 6–3
Win	5–0	Nov 2005	Australia F11, Barmera	Futures	Grass	(Australia) Luke Bourgeois	3–6, 6–2, 7–5
Loss	5–1	Feb 2007	United States F4, Brownsville	Futures	Hard	(South Africa) Wesley Whitehouse	3–6, 6–2, 5–7

=== Doubles: 38 (20 titles, 18 runner-ups) ===
Legend ATP Challenger Tour (8–11) ITF Futures Tour (12–7)	Finals by surface Hard (8–10) Clay (11–6) Grass (0–1) Carpet (1–1)

Result	W–L	Date	Tournament	Tier	Surface	Partner	Opponents	Score
Loss	0–1	Feb 2003	Croatia F2, Zagreb	Futures	Hard	(Romania) Florin Mergea	(Croatia) Ivan Cinkus (Slovenia) Andrej Kračman	7–5, 6–7^{(8–10)}, 1–6
Win	1–1	Apr 2003	Greece F2, Kalamata	Futures	Hard	(Romania) Florin Mergea	(Greece) Konstantinos Economidis (Greece) Nikos Rovas	6–4, 1–6, 6–3
Win	2–1	May 2003	Kuwait F2, Kuwait City	Futures	Hard	(Romania) Florin Mergea	(Germany) Ivo Klec (Czech Republic) Josef Neštický	6–4, 7–6^{(8–6)}
Win	3–1	May 2003	Kuwait F3, Kuwait City	Futures	Hard	(Romania) Florin Mergea	(Kuwait) Musaad Al Jazzaf (United Arab Emirates) Omar Alawadhi	6–2, 7–5
Loss	3–2	Jul 2003	Romania F4, Craiova	Futures	Clay	(Romania) Florin Mergea	(Romania) Adrian Barbu (Romania) Catalin-Ionut Gard	3-0 ret.
Win	4–2	Apr 2004	Greece F2, Syros	Futures	Hard	(Romania) Florin Mergea	(Czech Republic) Roman Michalik (Czech Republic) Pavel Šnobel	7–5, 3–6, 6–3
Win	5–2	Apr 2004	Qatar F1, Doha	Futures	Hard	(Romania) Florin Mergea	(Germany) Frank Moser (Germany) Bernard Parun	6–1, 6-2
Loss	5–3	May 2004	Lebanon F1, Jounieh	Futures	Clay	(Romania) Florin Mergea	(Republic of Ireland) Mustafa Ghouse (Republic of Ireland) Harsh Mankad	3–6, 7–5, 6–7^{)1–7)}
Win	6–3	May 2004	Lebanon F2, Jounieh	Futures	Clay	(Romania) Florin Mergea	(Croatia) Ivan Cerović (Greece) Alexandros Jakupovic	0–6, 6–3, 6–1
Win	7–3	Jun 2004	Romania F6, Constanța	Futures	Clay	(Romania) Florin Mergea	(Spain) David Luque-Velasco (Spain) Alberto Soriano-Maldonado	6–1, 7–6^{(7–5)}
Win	8–3	Jul 2004	Romania F9, Balș	Futures	Clay	(Romania) Florin Mergea	(Argentina) Juan-Martín Aranguren (Belgium) Dominique Coene	6–0, 4–6, 6–2
Loss	8–4	Jul 2004	Romania F11, Bucharest	Futures	Clay	(Romania) Florin Mergea	(Romania) Adrian Cruciat (Romania) Adrian-Vasile Gavrila	6–0, 4–6, 4–6
Win	9–4	Aug 2004	Timișoara, Romania	Challenger	Clay	(Romania) Florin Mergea	(Romania) Marius Calugaru (Romania) Ciprian Petre Porumb	6–3, 6–3
Win	10–4	Nov 2004	United States F32, Honolulu	Futures	Hard	(United States) Alex Kuznetsov	(United States) Zack Fleishman (United States) Wayne Odesnik	walkover
Loss	10–5	Nov 2005	Australia F10, Berri	Futures	Grass	(India) Rohan Bopanna	(Australia) Carsten Ball (Australia) Andrew Coelho	7–5, 3–6, [5–10]
Win	11–5	Jan 2006	United States F1, Tampa	Futures	Hard	(United States) Alex Kuznetsov	(United States) Alex Clayton (United States) Donald Young	7–6^{(11–9)}, 6-3
Loss	11–6	Jun 2006	Yuba City, United States	Challenger	Hard	(United States) Nicholas Monroe	(United States) Scott Lipsky (United States) David Martin	0–6, 4–6
Loss	11–7	Jul 2006	Constanța Romania	Challenger	Clay	(Romania) Florin Mergea	(Greece) Konstantinos Economidis (Netherlands Antilles) Jean-Julien Rojer	6–7^{(1–7)}, 1–6
Loss	11–8	Aug 2006	Manta, Ecuador	Challenger	Hard	(United States) Nicholas Monroe	(United States) Eric Nunez (Netherlands Antilles) Jean-Julien Rojer	3–6, 2–6
Loss	11–9	Nov 2006	Puebla, Mexico	Challenger	Hard	(Mexico) Bruno Echagaray	(Mexico) Daniel Garza (Netherlands Antilles) Jean-Julien Rojer	7–6^{(8–6)}, 3–6, [7–10]
Loss	11–10	Feb 2007	United States F4, Brownsville	Futures	Hard	(Russia) Alexander Kudryavtsev	(United States) Nicholas Monroe (South Africa) Izak van der Merwe	5–7, 6–7^{(5–7)}
Loss	11–11	Mar 2007	United States F5, Harlingen	Futures	Hard	(United States) Nicholas Monroe	(South Africa) Wesley Whitehouse (South Africa) Izak van der Merwe	3–6, 1–6
Win	12–11	Jun 2007	Romania F5, Bacău	Futures	Clay	(Romania) Florin Mergea	(Romania) Cosmin Cotet (Romania) Bogdan-Victor Leonte	6–7^{(5–7)}, 7–6^{(14–12)}, 6–2
Loss	12–12	Jul 2007	Constanța, Romania	Challenger	Clay	(Romania) Gabriel Moraru	(Spain) Marc Fornell Mestres (Spain) Gabriel Trujillo Soler	4–6, 4–6
Win	13–12	Jul 2007	Romania F11, Bucharest	Futures	Clay	(Romania) Petru-Alexandru Luncanu	(Romania) Laurentiu-Antoniu Erlic (Romania) Bogdan-Victor Leonte	6-4, 6-2
Loss	13–13	Aug 2007	Qarshi, Uzbekistan	Challenger	Hard	(Bosnia and Herzegovina) Ivan Dodig	(Australia) Andrew Coelho (Australia) Adam Feeney	3–6, 6–3, [7–10]
Win	14–13	Sep 2007	Brașov, Romania	Challenger	Clay	(Romania) Florin Mergea	(Romania) Marcel-Ioan Miron (Romania) Adrian Cruciat	5–7, 6–3, [10–8]
Loss	14–14	Sep 2007	Bucharest, Romania	Challenger	Clay	(Romania) Florin Mergea	(Spain) Marcel Granollers (Spain) Santiago Ventura	2–6, 1–6
Loss	14–15	Feb 2008	Besançon, France	Challenger	Hard	(Switzerland) Yves Allegro	(Germany) Philipp Petzschner (Austria) Alexander Peya	2–6, 1–6
Win	15–15	Mar 2008	Cherbourg, France	Challenger	Hard	(Romania) Florin Mergea	(Switzerland) Jean-Claude Scherrer (Brazil) Márcio Torres	7–5, 7–5
Loss	15–16	Apr 2009	Cremona, Italy	Challenger	Hard	(Romania) Florin Mergea	(Argentina) Eduardo Schwank (Serbia) Dušan Vemić	3–6, 2–6
Win	16–16	Jun 2008	Milan, Italy	Challenger	Clay	(Switzerland) Yves Allegro	(Argentina) Juan-Martín Aranguren (Spain) Marc Fornell Mestres	6–4, 6–4
Win	17–16	Jun 2008	Constanța, Romania	Challenger	Clay	(Romania) Florin Mergea	(Brazil) Júlio Silva (Italy) Simone Vagnozzi	6–4, 6–2
Win	18–16	Jul 2008	San Marino, San Marino	Challenger	Clay	(Switzerland) Yves Allegro	(Italy) Fabio Colangelo (Germany) Philipp Marx	7–5, 7–5
Loss	18–17	Oct 2008	Mons, Belgium	Challenger	Hard	(Switzerland) Yves Allegro	(Slovakia) Michal Mertiňák (Croatia) Lovro Zovko	5–7, 3–6
Loss	18–18	Oct 2008	Rennes, France	Challenger	Carpet	(Switzerland) Yves Allegro	(United Kingdom) James Auckland (Belgium) Dick Norman	3–6, 4–6
Win	19–18	Nov 2008	Eckental, Germany	Challenger	Carpet	(Switzerland) Yves Allegro	(United Kingdom) James Auckland (Brazil) Márcio Torres	6–3, 3–6, [10–7]
Win	20–18	Mar 2010	Marrakesh, Morocco	Challenger	Clay	(Serbia) Ilija Bozoljac	(United States) James Cerretani (Canada) Adil Shamasdin	6–1, 6-1

== Junior Grand Slam finals ==
=== Boys' doubles: 4 (2 titles, 2 runner–ups) ===
Result	Year	Tournament	Surface	Partner	Opponents	Score
Loss	2002	Australian Open	Hard	(Romania) Florin Mergea	(Australia) Ryan Henry (Australia) Todd Reid	walkover
Win	2002	Wimbledon	Grass	(Romania) Florin Mergea	(United States) Brian Baker (United States) Rajeev Ram	6–4, 4–6, 6–4
Loss	2003	Australian Open	Hard	(Romania) Florin Mergea	(United States) Scott Oudsema (United States) Phillip Simmonds	4–6, 4–6
Win	2003	Wimbledon	Grass	(Romania) Florin Mergea	(Australia) Chris Guccione (Australia) Adam Feeney	7–6^{(7–4)}, 7–5

== ATP Tour career earnings ==
Year	Majors	ATP wins	Total wins	Earnings ($)	Money list rank
2003	0	0	0	3,714	821
2004	0	0	0	17,433	414
2005	0	0	0	16,416	428
2006	0	0	0	14,360	501
2007	0	0	0	18,625	455
2008	0	0	0	47,861,	310
2009	0	0	0	103,430	202
2010	0	5	5	241,780	116
2011	0	4	4	447,311	70
2012	0	4	4	497,956	61
2013	0	3	3	294,482	146
2014	0	8	8	519,036	100
2015	1	2	3	886,584	100
2016	0	2	2	442,130	100
2017	1	3	4	774,623	100
2018	0	2	2	371,879	130
2019	0	2	2	652,307	95
2020	0	0	0	156,354	n/a
2021	0	1	1	362,112	135
Career	2	36	38	$5,882,695	157

== Publication ==
- Tecău, Horia (2016). Viața în ritm de tenis (in Romanian). Curtea Veche Publishing. ISBN 978-606-588-920-0.

Awards
Preceded by (United States) Bob Bryan & (United States) Mike Bryan	ATP Doubles Team of the Year (with (Netherlands) Jean-Julien Rojer); 2015	Succeeded by (United Kingdom) Jamie Murray & (Brazil) Bruno Soares
Preceded by (United States) Bob Bryan & (United States) Mike Bryan	ITF Men's Doubles World Champion (with (Netherlands) Jean-Julien Rojer); 2015	Succeeded by (United Kingdom) Jamie Murray & (Brazil) Bruno Soares
Preceded by (Croatia) Marin Čilić	Arthur Ashe Humanitarian of the Year; 2017	Succeeded by (Spain) Tommy Robredo
Olympic Games
Preceded by Valeria Motogna-Beșe	Flagbearer for Romania; London 2012	Succeeded by Cătălina Ponor
