= Robert Lindstedt =

Swedish tennis player

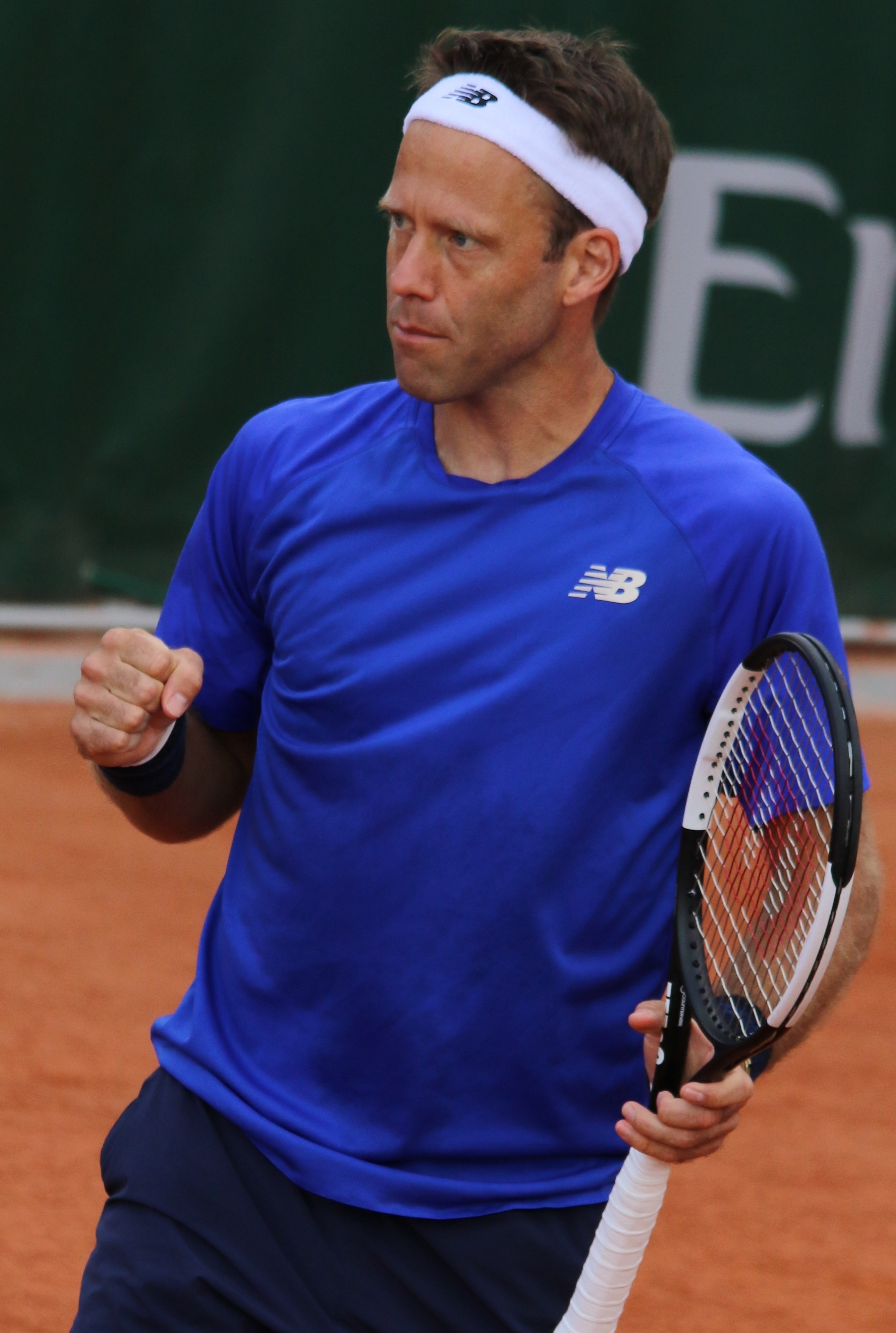
- Robert Lindstedt at the 2019 French Open
- Country (sports): Sweden
- Residence: Stockholm, Sweden
- Born: 19 March 1977 (age 49) Sundbyberg, Sweden
- Height: 1.93 m (6 ft 4 in)
- Turned pro: 1998
- Retired: December 2021
- Plays: Right-handed (two-handed backhand)
- College: Pepperdine University
- Prize money: $3,742,773

Singles
- Career record: 0–4
- Career titles: 0
- Highest ranking: No. 309 (26 April 2004)

Doubles
- Career record: 441–375
- Career titles: 23
- Highest ranking: No. 3 (20 May 2013)

Grand Slam doubles results
- Australian Open: W (2014)
- French Open: QF (2011, 2014)
- Wimbledon: F (2010, 2011, 2012)
- US Open: SF (2015)

Other doubles tournaments
- Tour Finals: SF (2014)
- Olympic Games: 2R (2012)

Mixed doubles
- Career record: 20–19
- Career titles: 0

Grand Slam mixed doubles results
- Australian Open: 2R (2015, 2016, 2017, 2019)
- French Open: QF (2015)
- Wimbledon: F (2019)
- US Open: QF (2008, 2009)

Other mixed doubles tournaments
- Olympic Games: 1R (2012)

Team competitions
- Davis Cup: QF (2008, 2011)

Robert Lindstedt (born 19 March 1977) is a Swedish former professional tennis player who specialized in doubles. He turned professional in 1998, and reached a career-high doubles ranking of world No. 3 in May 2013. Lindstedt won his first Grand Slam title at the 2014 Australian Open with partner Łukasz Kubot. He has also reached four finals at the Wimbledon Championships: in 2010, 2011 and 2012 alongside Horia Tecău in men's doubles, and in 2019 with Jeļena Ostapenko in mixed doubles.

Lindstedt has won 23 doubles titles on the ATP Tour, including one at Masters 1000 level at the 2012 Western & Southern Open. He represented Sweden in the Davis Cup from 2007 to 2021, as well as at the 2012 Olympic Games.

== Career ==
=== Early years ===
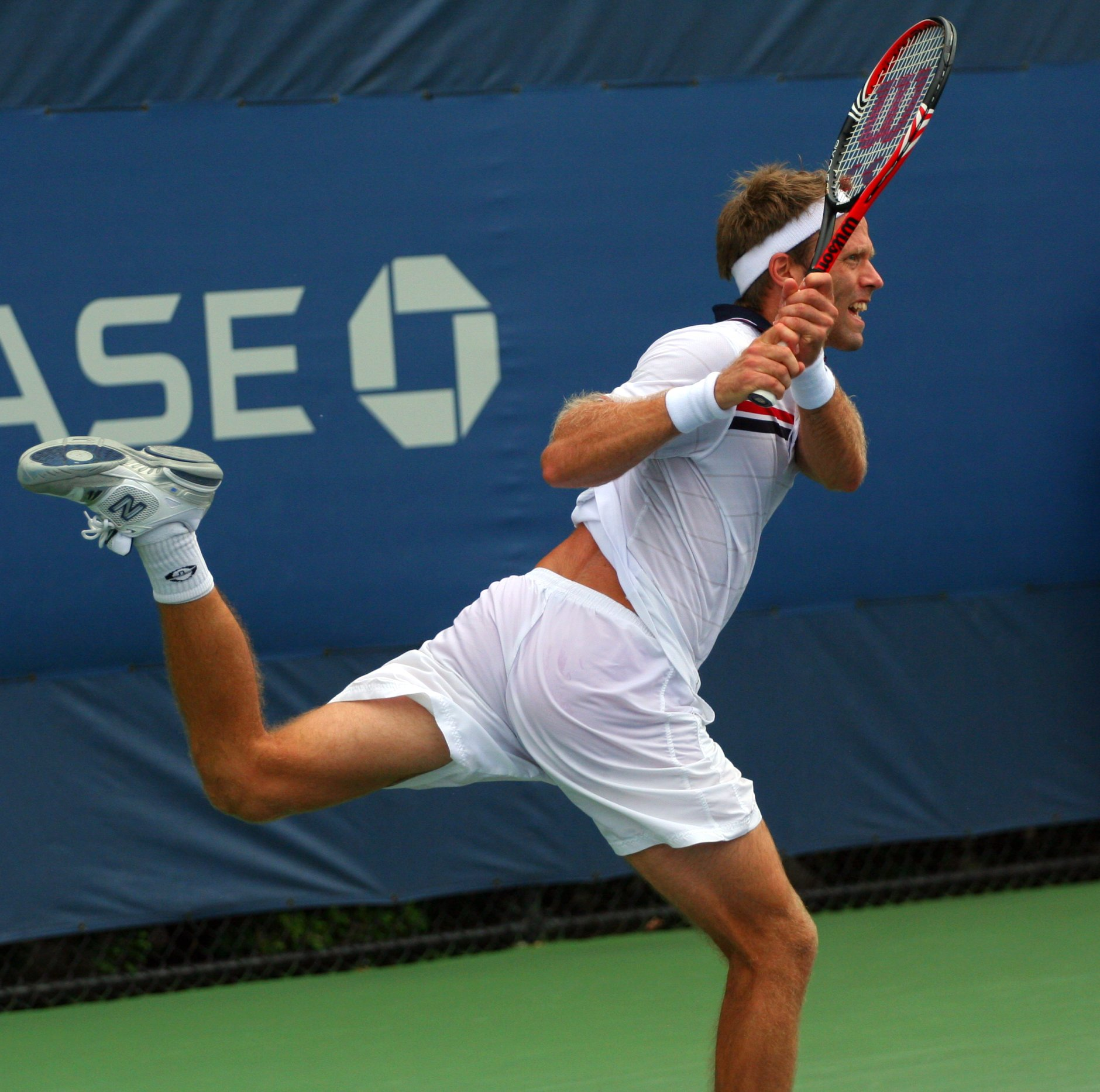
Lindstedt at the 2010 US Open

Lindstedt played college tennis in the United States, playing first at Fresno State University before following coach Peter Smith to Pepperdine University, where he completed his collegiate career. While at Pepperdine, he teamed with Kelly Gullett in doubles competition. They were runners-up at the 1667 NCAA individual competition at the University of Georgia, receiving all-America honors for the second year in a row.

=== 2007–2008 ===
Lindstedt won two doubles titles in 2007, the first in Mumbai with Jarkko Nieminen against Indian Rohan Bopanna and Pakistani Aisam-ul-Haq Qureshi. The second came paired with Jordan Kerr in Tokyo, beating Frank Dancevic and Stephen Huss. In 2008. Lindstedt paired with Marc Gicquel to win the Washington tournament and was a semifinalist at the ATP Master Series event in Indian Wells with Richard Gasquet, in Tokyo with Jordan Kerr, and in Kitzbühel with Jürgen Melzer.

Robert was part of a team including Robin Söderling, Thomas Johansson, and coach Peter Carlsson who beat the Russian tennis team (of Dmitry Tursunov, Igor Andreev, and Mikhail Youzhny) 2–1 in the ARAG World Team Cup in Düsseldorf.

=== 2010: Four titles, First Wimbledon final with Tecău ===
Lindstedt reached his first Grand Slam final at Wimbledon, with long-time partner Horia Tecău.

=== 2011: Second Wimbledon final with Tecău ===
Lindstedt reached his second Grand Slam final again at Wimbledon with Horia Tecău.

=== 2012: Four titles including a Masters 1000, Third Wimbledon final in a row, Top 10 year-end ranking ===
Lindstedt and Horia Tecău of Romania reached their third Wimbledon final in a row. They also defeated Alexander Peya of Austria and Bruno Soares of Brazil to win the Swedish Open.

=== 2013: World No. 3 in doubles ===
Robert and Nenad Zimonjic of Serbia partnered during the first three months; they won the Rotterdam Open together. Later, Lindstedt played with Daniel Nestor and reached the final of the Barcelona Open (tennis) on clay at their second tournament together. Lindstedt scored his first win over the Bryan brothers with Nestor before they stopped playing together.

=== 2014: Australian Open doubles champion with Kubot ===
Lindstedt and Łukasz Kubot of Poland won the Australian Open together, after failing to win a match before the Grand Slam event.

=== 2021: Retirement ===
His last ATP tournament in his career was the 2021 Stockholm Open where he reached the quarterfinals with Swedish compatriot Andre Goransson. He also partnered Goransson in the Davis Cup.

== Doubles performance timeline ==
Key
| W | F | SF | QF | #R | RR | Q# | P# | DNQ | A | Z# | PO | G | S | B | NMS | NTI | P | NH |

(W) winner; (F) finalist; (SF) semifinalist; (QF) quarterfinalist; (#R) rounds 4, 3, 2, 1; (RR) round-robin stage; (Q#) qualification round; (P#) preliminary round; (DNQ) did not qualify; (A) absent; (Z#) Davis/Fed Cup Zonal Group (with number indication) or (PO) play-off; (G) gold, (S) silver or (B) bronze Olympic/Paralympic medal; (NMS) not a Masters tournament; (NTI) not a Tier I tournament; (P) postponed; (NH) not held; (SR) strike rate (events won / competed); (W–L) win–loss record.

| Tournament | 2000 | 2001 | 2002 | 2003 | 2004 | 2005 | 2006 | 2007 | 2008 | 2009 | 2010 | 2011 | 2012 | 2013 | 2014 | 2015 | 2016 | 2017 | 2018 | 2019 | 2020 | 2021 | SR | W–L |
|---|---|---|---|---|---|---|---|---|---|---|---|---|---|---|---|---|---|---|---|---|---|---|---|---|
Grand Slam tournaments
| Australian Open | A | A | A | A | A | A | 2R | 1R | 2R | 2R | 1R | 1R | SF | 2R | W | 2R | 3R | 2R | 2R | 1R | 1R | A | 1 / 15 | 19–14 |
| French Open | A | A | A | A | A | 1R | 1R | A | 2R | 1R | 1R | QF | 2R | 2R | QF | 2R | A | 3R | 1R | 1R | 2R | A | 0 / 14 | 13–14 |
| Wimbledon | A | A | A | A | 2R | 2R | 1R | 2R | QF | 3R | F | F | F | QF | 2R | 2R | 3R | 3R | QF | 2R | NH | A | 0 / 16 | 35–16 |
| US Open | A | A | A | A | 1R | 2R | 2R | 2R | QF | 3R | 3R | QF | 3R | 2R | 2R | SF | QF | 3R | 1R | 1R | A | A | 0 / 16 | 26–16 |
| Win–loss | 0–0 | 0–0 | 0–0 | 0–0 | 1–2 | 2–3 | 2–4 | 2–3 | 8–4 | 5–4 | 7–4 | 11–4 | 11–4 | 6–4 | 11–3 | 7–4 | 7–3 | 7–4 | 4–4 | 1–4 | 1–2 | 0–0 | 1 / 61 | 93–60 |
Year-end championships
| ATP Finals | Did not qualify | | | | | | | | | | | RR | RR | DNQ | SF | Did not qualify | | | | | | | 0 / 3 | 5–5 |
National representation
| Olympics | A | Not Held | | | A | Not Held | | | A | Not Held | | | 2R | Not Held | | | A | Not Held | | | | A | 0 / 1 | 1–1 |
| Davis Cup | A | A | A | A | A | A | A | A | QF | 1R | 1R | QF | 1R | Z1 | Z1 | Z1 | Z1 | A | PO | QR | QF | | 0 / 6 | 16–6 |
ATP Tour Masters 1000
| Indian Wells Masters | A | A | A | A | A | A | 1R | QF | SF | 1R | 1R | 1R | 2R | 1R | 2R | A | 2R | A | A | A | NH | A | 0 / 10 | 8–10 |
| Miami Open | A | A | A | A | A | A | 2R | 1R | 1R | 2R | 1R | QF | 1R | QF | 2R | 2R | 1R | 1R | A | A | NH | A | 0 / 12 | 8–12 |
| Monte-Carlo Masters | A | A | A | A | A | A | A | A | A | 1R | 1R | 2R | 2R | QF | 2R | A | 2R | A | A | A | NH | A | 0 / 7 | 2–7 |
| Madrid Open | NH | | A | A | A | A | A | 1R | A | A | 2R | 1R | F | QF | 2R | A | A | A | A | 1R | NH | A | 0 / 7 | 5–7 |
| Italian Open | A | A | A | A | A | A | A | A | A | 1R | A | QF | SF | QF | 2R | 1R | A | A | A | A | A | A | 0 / 6 | 5–6 |
| Canadian Open | A | A | A | A | A | A | 1R | A | A | 2R | 2R | 2R | SF | SF | 1R | 2R | 1R | A | A | A | NH | A | 0 / 9 | 7–9 |
| Cincinnati Masters | A | A | A | A | A | A | 2R | A | 2R | 2R | 1R | 2R | W | 2R | QF | A | A | A | A | A | A | A | 1 / 8 | 9–7 |
| Shanghai Masters | Not Masters Series | | | | | | | | | 1R | 2R | QF | 2R | QF | 2R | 2R | 2R | A | QF | A | NH | | 0 / 9 | 8–9 |
| Paris Masters | A | A | A | A | A | A | A | 1R | 1R | A | 1R | 2R | 2R | 1R | 1R | SF | A | A | A | A | A | A | 0 / 8 | 4–8 |
| German Open | A | A | A | A | A | A | 2R | A | 1R | Not Masters Series | | | | | | | | | | | | | 0 / 2 | 1–2 |
| Win–loss | 0–0 | 0–0 | 0–0 | 0–0 | 0–0 | 0–0 | 3–5 | 2–4 | 4–5 | 3–7 | 3–8 | 5–9 | 12–8 | 9–9 | 6–9 | 6–5 | 2–5 | 0–1 | 2–1 | 0–1 | 0–0 | 0–0 | 1 / 78 | 57–77 |
Career statistics
| | 2000 | 2001 | 2002 | 2003 | 2004 | 2005 | 2006 | 2007 | 2008 | 2009 | 2010 | 2011 | 2012 | 2013 | 2014 | 2015 | 2016 | 2017 | 2018 | 2019 | 2020 | 2021 | Career | |
| Titles | 0 | 0 | 0 | 0 | 0 | 0 | 0 | 2 | 1 | 3 | 4 | 2 | 4 | 1 | 1 | 1 | 1 | 1 | 1 | 1 | 0 | 0 | 23 | |
| Finals | 0 | 0 | 0 | 0 | 0 | 1 | 2 | 2 | 1 | 6 | 6 | 7 | 8 | 4 | 1 | 2 | 2 | 1 | 3 | 2 | 0 | 0 | 48 | |
| Overall win–loss | 1–1 | 0–0 | 0–0 | 0–0 | 4–7 | 10–13 | 19–27 | 22–22 | 29–27 | 38–28 | 36–29 | 42–25 | 50–23 | 32–26 | 28–25 | 36–26 | 28–26 | 15–18 | 28–19 | 17–22 | 4–9 | 2–2 | 441–375 | |
| Year-end ranking | 235 | 357 | 934 | 204 | 96 | 62 | 42 | 39 | 26 | 27 | 21 | 16 | 8 | 19 | 13 | 26 | 39 | 72 | 46 | 70 | 87 | 184 | 54% | |

== Significant finals ==
=== Grand Slam finals ===
==== Doubles: 4 (1–3) ====
| Result | Year | Championship | Surface | Partner | Opponents | Score |
|---|---|---|---|---|---|---|
| Loss | 2010 | Wimbledon | Grass | (Romania) Horia Tecău | (Austria) Jürgen Melzer (Germany) Philipp Petzschner | 1–6, 5–7, 5–7 |
| Loss | 2011 | Wimbledon (2) | Grass | (Romania) Horia Tecău | (United States) Bob Bryan (United States) Mike Bryan | 3–6, 4–6, 6–7^{(2–7)} |
| Loss | 2012 | Wimbledon (3) | Grass | (Romania) Horia Tecău | (United Kingdom) Jonathan Marray (Denmark) Frederik Nielsen | 6–4, 4–6, 6–7^{(5–7)}, 7–6^{(7–5)}, 3–6 |
| Win | 2014 | Australian Open | Hard | (Poland) Łukasz Kubot | (United States) Eric Butorac (South Africa) Raven Klaasen | 6–3, 6–3 |

==== Mixed doubles: 1 (0–1) ====
| Result | Year | Championship | Surface | Partner | Opponents | Score |
|---|---|---|---|---|---|---|
| Loss | 2019 | Wimbledon | Grass | (Latvia) Jeļena Ostapenko | (Croatia) Ivan Dodig (Chinese Taipei) Latisha Chan | 6–3, 6–2 |

=== Masters 1000 finals ===
==== Doubles: 2 (1–1) ====
| Result | Year | Tournament | Surface | Partner | Opponents | Score |
|---|---|---|---|---|---|---|
| Loss | 2012 | Madrid | Clay (blue) | (Romania) Horia Tecău | (Poland) Mariusz Fyrstenberg (Poland) Marcin Matkowski | 3–6, 4–6 |
| Win | 2012 | Cincinnati | Hard | (Romania) Horia Tecău | (India) Mahesh Bhupathi (India) Rohan Bopanna | 6–4, 6–4 |

== ATP career finals ==
=== Doubles: 48 (23 titles, 25 runner-ups) ===
| Legend (pre/post 2009) Grand Slam tournaments (1–3) ATP Masters Series / ATP World Tour Masters 1000 (1–1) ATP International Series Gold / ATP World Tour 500 Series (3–8) ATP International Series / ATP World Tour 250 Series (18–13) | Finals by surface Hard (13–12) Clay (7–7) Grass (3–5) Carpet (0–1) | Finals by setting Outdoor (20–19) Indoor (3–6) |

| Result | W–L | Date | Tournament | Tier | Surface | Partner | Opponents | Score |
|---|---|---|---|---|---|---|---|---|
| Loss | 0–1 | Oct 2005 | Vietnam Open | International | Carpet (i) | (Australia) Ashley Fisher | (Germany) Lars Burgsmüller (Germany) Philipp Kohlschreiber | 6–5^{(7–3)}, 4–6, 2–6 (Note: Tie-breaks were held at 5–5 and not 6–6 in this tournament.) |
| Loss | 0–2 | Mar 2006 | Las Vegas Open, United States | International | Hard | (Czech Republic) Jaroslav Levinský | (United States) Bob Bryan (United States) Mike Bryan | 3–6, 2–6 |
| Loss | 0–3 | Jul 2006 | Stuttgart Open, Germany | Intl. Gold | Clay | (Switzerland) Yves Allegro | (Argentina) Gastón Gaudio (Belarus) Max Mirnyi | 5–7, 7–6^{(7–4)}, [10–12] |
| Win | 1–3 | Sep 2007 | Mumbai Open, India | International | Hard | (Finland) Jarkko Nieminen | (India) Rohan Bopanna (Pakistan) Aisam-ul-Haq Qureshi | 7–6^{(7–3)}, 7–6^{(7–5)} |
| Win | 2–3 | Oct 2007 | Japan Open | Intl. Gold | Hard | (Australia) Jordan Kerr | (Canada) Frank Dancevic (Australia) Stephen Huss | 6–4, 6–4 |
| Win | 3–3 | Aug 2008 | Washington Open, United States | International | Hard | (France) Marc Gicquel | (Brazil) Bruno Soares (Zimbabwe) Kevin Ullyett | 7–6^{(8–6)}, 6–3 |
| Win | 4–3 | Jan 2009 | Auckland Open, New Zealand | 250 Series | Hard | (Czech Republic) Martin Damm | (United States) Scott Lipsky (India) Leander Paes | 7–5, 6–4 |
| Win | 5–3 | Feb 2009 | Zagreb Indoors, Croatia | 250 Series | Hard (i) | (Czech Republic) Martin Damm | (Germany) Christopher Kas (Netherlands) Rogier Wassen | 6–4, 6–3 |
| Loss | 5–4 | Feb 2009 | Dubai Tennis Championships, UAE | 500 Series | Hard | (Czech Republic) Martin Damm | (South Africa) Rik de Voest (Russia) Dmitry Tursunov | 6–4, 3–6, [5–10] |
| Loss | 5–5 | May 2009 | Estoril Open, Portugal | 250 Series | Clay | (Czech Republic) Martin Damm | (United States) Eric Butorac (United States) Scott Lipsky | 3–6, 2–6 |
| Loss | 5–6 | Jul 2009 | Swedish Open | 250 Series | Clay | (Sweden) Robin Söderling | (Czech Republic) Jaroslav Levinský (Slovakia) Filip Polášek | 6–1, 3–6, [7–10] |
| Win | 6–6 | Aug 2009 | Washington Open, United States (2) | 500 Series | Hard | (Czech Republic) Martin Damm | (Poland) Mariusz Fyrstenberg (Poland) Marcin Matkowski | 7–5, 7–6^{(7–3)} |
| Loss | 6–7 | Feb 2010 | Open 13, France | 250 Series | Hard (i) | (Austria) Julian Knowle | (France) Julien Benneteau (France) Michaël Llodra | 4–6, 3–6 |
| Win | 7–7 | Apr 2010 | Grand Prix Hassan II, Morocco | 250 Series | Clay | (Romania) Horia Tecău | (India) Rohan Bopanna (Pakistan) Aisam-ul-Haq Qureshi | 6–2, 3–6, [10–7] |
| Win | 8–7 | Jun 2010 | Rosmalen Championships, Netherlands | 250 Series | Grass | (Romania) Horia Tecău | (Czech Republic) Lukáš Dlouhý (India) Leander Paes | 1–6, 7–5, [10–7] |
| Loss | 8–8 | Jul 2010 | Wimbledon, United Kingdom | Grand Slam | Grass | (Romania) Horia Tecău | (Austria) Jürgen Melzer (Germany) Philipp Petzschner | 1–6, 5–7, 5–7 |
| Win | 9–8 | Jul 2010 | Swedish Open | 250 Series | Clay | (Romania) Horia Tecău | (Italy) Andreas Seppi (Italy) Simone Vagnozzi | 6–4, 7–5 |
| Win | 10–8 | Aug 2010 | New Haven Open, United States | 250 Series | Hard | (Romania) Horia Tecău | (India) Rohan Bopanna (Pakistan) Aisam-ul-Haq Qureshi | 6–4, 7–5 |
| Loss | 10–9 | Jan 2011 | Brisbane International, Australia | 250 Series | Hard | (Romania) Horia Tecău | (Czech Republic) Lukáš Dlouhý (Australia) Paul Hanley | 4–6, ret. |
| Win | 11–9 | Apr 2011 | Grand Prix Hassan II, Morocco (2) | 250 Series | Clay | (Romania) Horia Tecău | (United Kingdom) Colin Fleming (Slovakia) Igor Zelenay | 6–2, 6–1 |
| Loss | 11–10 | Jun 2011 | Rosmalen Championships, Netherlands | 250 Series | Grass | (Romania) Horia Tecău | (Italy) Daniele Bracciali (Czech Republic) František Čermák | 3–6, 6–2, [8–10] |
| Loss | 11–11 | Jul 2011 | Wimbledon, United Kingdom | Grand Slam | Grass | (Romania) Horia Tecău | (United States) Bob Bryan (United States) Mike Bryan | 3–6, 4–6, 6–7^{(3–7)} |
| Win | 12–11 | Jul 2011 | Swedish Open (2) | 250 Series | Clay | (Romania) Horia Tecău | (Sweden) Simon Aspelin (Sweden) Andreas Siljeström | 6–3, 6–3 |
| Loss | 12–12 | Aug 2011 | Washington Open, United States | 500 Series | Hard | (Romania) Horia Tecău | (France) Michaël Llodra (Serbia) Nenad Zimonjić | 7–6^{(9–7)}, 6–7^{(8–10)}, [7–10] |
| Loss | 12–13 | Oct 2011 | China Open | 500 Series | Hard | (Romania) Horia Tecău | (France) Michaël Llodra (Serbia) Nenad Zimonjić | 6–7^{(2–7)}, 6–7^{(4–7)} |
| Loss | 12–14 | Feb 2012 | Rotterdam Open, Netherlands | 500 Series | Hard (i) | (Romania) Horia Tecău | (France) Michaël Llodra (Serbia) Nenad Zimonjić | 6–4, 5–7, [14–16] |
| Win | 13–14 | Apr 2012 | Romanian Open | 250 Series | Clay | (Romania) Horia Tecău | (France) Jérémy Chardy (Poland) Łukasz Kubot | 7–6^{(7–2)}, 6–3 |
| Loss | 13–15 | May 2012 | Madrid Open, Spain | Masters 1000 | Clay | (Romania) Horia Tecău | (Poland) Mariusz Fyrstenberg (Poland) Marcin Matkowski | 3–6, 4–6 |
| Win | 14–15 | Jun 2012 | Rosmalen Championships, Netherlands (2) | 250 Series | Grass | (Romania) Horia Tecău | (Colombia) Juan Sebastián Cabal (Russia) Dmitry Tursunov | 6–3, 7–6^{(7–1)} |
| Loss | 14–16 | Jul 2012 | Wimbledon, United Kingdom | Grand Slam | Grass | (Romania) Horia Tecău | (United Kingdom) Jonathan Marray (Denmark) Frederik Nielsen | 6–4, 4–6, 6–7^{(5–7)}, 7–6^{(7–5)}, 3–6 |
| Win | 15–16 | Jul 2012 | Swedish Open (3) | 250 Series | Clay | (Romania) Horia Tecău | (Austria) Alexander Peya (Brazil) Bruno Soares | 6–3, 7–6^{(7–5)} |
| Win | 16–16 | Aug 2012 | Cincinnati Masters, United States | Masters 1000 | Hard | (Romania) Horia Tecău | (India) Mahesh Bhupathi (India) Rohan Bopanna | 6–4, 6–4 |
| Loss | 16–17 | Oct 2012 | Stockholm Open, Sweden | 250 Series | Hard (i) | (Serbia) Nenad Zimonjić | (Brazil) Marcelo Melo (Brazil) Bruno Soares | 7–6^{(7–4)}, 5–7, [6–10] |
| Win | 17–17 | Feb 2013 | Rotterdam Open, Netherlands | 500 Series | Hard (i) | (Serbia) Nenad Zimonjić | (Netherlands) Thiemo de Bakker (Netherlands) Jesse Huta Galung | 5–7, 6–3, [10–8] |
| Loss | 17–18 | Mar 2013 | Dubai Tennis Championships, UAE | 500 Series | Hard | (Serbia) Nenad Zimonjić | (India) Mahesh Bhupathi (France) Michaël Llodra | 6–7^{(6–8)}, 6–7^{(6–8)} |
| Loss | 17–19 | Apr 2013 | Barcelona Open, Spain | 500 Series | Clay | (Canada) Daniel Nestor | (Austria) Alexander Peya (Brazil) Bruno Soares | 7–5, 6–7^{(7–9)}, [4–10] |
| Loss | 17–20 | Oct 2013 | Stockholm Open, Sweden | 250 Series | Hard (i) | (Sweden) Jonas Björkman | (Pakistan) Aisam-ul-Haq Qureshi (Netherlands) Jean-Julien Rojer | 2–6, 2–6 |
| Win | 18–20 | Jan 2014 | Australian Open | Grand Slam | Hard | (Poland) Łukasz Kubot | (United States) Eric Butorac (South Africa) Raven Klaasen | 6–3, 6–3 |
| Loss | 18–21 | May 2015 | Istanbul Open, Turkey | 250 Series | Clay | (Austria) Jürgen Melzer | (Moldova) Radu Albot (Serbia) Dušan Lajović | 4–6, 6–7^{(2–7)} |
| Win | 19–21 | Aug 2015 | Winston-Salem Open, United States | 250 Series | Hard | (United Kingdom) Dominic Inglot | (United States) Eric Butorac (United States) Scott Lipsky | 6–2, 6–4 |
| Win | 20–21 | Oct 2016 | Shenzhen Open, China | 250 Series | Hard | (Italy) Fabio Fognini | (Austria) Oliver Marach (France) Fabrice Martin | 7–6^{(7–4)}, 6–3 |
| Loss | 20–22 | Oct 2016 | Swiss Indoors, Switzerland | 500 Series | Hard (i) | (New Zealand) Michael Venus | (Spain) Marcel Granollers (United States) Jack Sock | 3–6, 4–6 |
| Win | 21–22 | Jun 2017 | Antalya Open, Turkey | 250 Series | Grass | (Pakistan) Aisam-ul-Haq Qureshi | (Austria) Oliver Marach (Croatia) Mate Pavić | 7–5, 4–1 ret. |
| Win | 22–22 | May 2018 | Istanbul Open, Turkey | 250 Series | Clay | (United Kingdom) Dominic Inglot | (Japan) Ben McLachlan (United States) Nicholas Monroe | 3–6, 6–3, [10–8] |
| Loss | 22–23 | Jun 2018 | Stuttgart Open, Germany | 250 Series | Grass | (Poland) Marcin Matkowski | (Germany) Philipp Petzschner (Germany) Tim Pütz | 6–7^{(5–7)}, 3–6 |
| Loss | 22–24 | Sep 2018 | Shenzhen Open, China | 250 Series | Hard | (United States) Rajeev Ram | (Japan) Ben McLachlan (United Kingdom) Joe Salisbury | 6–7^{(5–7)}, 6–7^{(4–7)} |
| Loss | 22–25 | May 2019 | Geneva Open, Switzerland | 250 Series | Clay | (Australia) Matthew Ebden | (Austria) Oliver Marach (Croatia) Mate Pavić | 4–6, 4–6 |
| Win | 23–25 | Sep 2019 | Moselle Open, France | 250 Series | Hard (i) | (Germany) Jan-Lennard Struff | (France) Nicolas Mahut (France) Édouard Roger-Vasselin | 2–6, 7–6^{(7–1)}, [10–4] |

== Wins over top 10 players ==
=== Doubles ===
- He has a 40–78 record against players who were, at the time the match was played, ranked in the top 10.

| Type | 2006 | 2007 | 2008 | 2009 | 2010 | 2011 | 2012 | 2013 | 2014 | 2015 | 2016 | 2017 | 2018 | 2019 | Total |
|---|---|---|---|---|---|---|---|---|---|---|---|---|---|---|---|
| Wins | 1 | 2 | 5 | 2 | 2 | 4 | 5 | 3 | 5 | 3 | 3 | 2 | 0 | 3 | 40 |

| # | Opponents | Rank | Event | Surface | Rd | Score | Partner | RLR |
|---|---|---|---|---|---|---|---|---|
2006
| 1. | (Sweden) Jonas Björkman (Belarus) Max Mirnyi | 4; 3 | Las Vegas, United States | Hard | QF | 6–3, 4–6, [13–11] | (Czech Republic) Jaroslav Levinský | 50 |
2007
| 2. | (United States) Bob Bryan (United States) Mike Bryan | 3; 3 | Indian Wells, United States | Hard | 1R | 6–4, 6–4 | (Finland) Jarkko Nieminen | 49 |
| 3. | (Sweden) Jonas Björkman (Belarus) Max Mirnyi | 4; 3 | Wimbledon, London, United Kingdom | Grass | 1R | 2–6, 7–6^{(7–4)}, 7–5, 6–3 | (Finland) Jarkko Nieminen | 51 |
2008
| 4. | (Sweden) Simon Aspelin (Austria) Julian Knowle | 8; 6 | Australian Open, Australia | Hard | 1R | 6–4, 4–6, 6–2 | (Finland) Jarkko Nieminen | 42 |
| 5. | (Czech Republic) Michal Tabara (Czech Republic) Pavel Vízner | - 5 | World Team Cup, Düsseldorf, Germany | Clay | RR | 6–4, 7–5 | (Sweden) Robin Söderling | 35 |
| 6. | (Sweden) Simon Aspelin (Austria) Julian Knowle | 10; 9 | Wimbledon, London, United Kingdom | Grass | 1R | 6–4, 4–6, 7–6^{(8–6)}, 7–6^{(7–4)} | (South Africa) Kevin Anderson | 41 |
| 7. | (Brazil) Bruno Soares (Zimbabwe) Kevin Ullyett | 39; 8 | Washington, United States | Hard | F | 7–6^{(8–6)}, 6–3 | (France) Marc Gicquel | 32 |
| 8. | (Canada) Daniel Nestor (Serbia) Nenad Zimonjić | 1; 4 | US Open, New York, United States | Hard | 3R | 6–4, 6–7^{(11–13)}, 6–2 | (Finland) Jarkko Nieminen | 28 |
2009
| 9. | (United States) Scott Lipsky (India) Leander Paes | 47; 10 | Auckland, New Zealand | Hard | F | 7–5, 6–4 | (Czech Republic) Martin Damm | 25 |
| 10. | (India) Mahesh Bhupathi (The Bahamas) Mark Knowles | 9; 7 | Washington, United States | Hard | QF | 3–6, 6–1, [16–14] | (Czech Republic) Martin Damm | 23 |
| - | (Canada) Daniel Nestor (Serbia) Nenad Zimonjić | 4; 3 | Washington, United States | Hard | SF | Walkover | (Czech Republic) Martin Damm | 23 |
2010
| 11. | (Czech Republic) Lukáš Dlouhý (India) Leander Paes | 5; 6 | 's-Hertogenbosch, Netherlands | Grass | F | 1–6, 7–5, [10–7] | (Romania) Horia Tecău | 29 |
| 12. | (India) Mahesh Bhupathi (Belarus) Max Mirnyi | 7; 12 | Wimbledon, London, United Kingdom | Grass | 3R | 3–6, 4–6, 6–3, 7–6^{(10–8)}, 8–6 | (Romania) Horia Tecău | 27 |
2011
| 13. | (Poland) Mariusz Fyrstenberg (Poland) Marcin Matkowski | 11; 10 | Rome, Italy | Clay | 2R | 5–7, 7–6^{(9–7)}, [10–3] | (Romania) Horia Tecău | 22 |
| 14. | (Serbia) Novak Djokovic (Serbia) Nenad Zimonjić | 245; 6 | Davis Cup, Halmstad, Sweden | Hard (i) | QF | 6–4, 7–6^{(7–5)}, 7–5 | (Sweden) Simon Aspelin | 14 |
| 15. | (Belarus) Max Mirnyi (Canada) Daniel Nestor | 4; 5 | Beijing, China | Hard | QF | 7–6^{(8–6)}, 2–6, [10–6] | (Romania) Horia Tecău | 16 |
| 16. | (India) Mahesh Bhupathi (India) Leander Paes | 7; 8 | ATP Finals, London, United Kingdom | Hard (i) | RR | 7–6^{(8–6)}, 6–1 | (Romania) Horia Tecău | 14 |
2012
| 17. | (Serbia) Janko Tipsarević (Serbia) Nenad Zimonjić | 83; 6 | Davis Cup, Niš, Serbia | Hard (i) | 1R | 3–6, 6–3, 7–6^{(7–4)}, 6–7^{(3–7)}, 10–8 | (Sweden) Johan Brunström | 10 |
| 18. | (India) Leander Paes (Serbia) Janko Tipsarević | 7; 83 | Dubai, United Arab Emirates | Hard | 1R | 6–4, 7–5 | (Romania) Horia Tecău | 8 |
| 19. | (Poland) Mariusz Fyrstenberg (Poland) Marcin Matkowski | 8; 8 | Rome, Italy | Clay | QF | 6–2, 1–6, [12–10] | (Romania) Horia Tecău | 10 |
| 20. | (Spain) Marcel Granollers (Spain) Marc López | 18; 10 | Cincinnati, United States | Hard | QF | 7–6^{(7–3)}, 7–6^{(7–2)} | (Romania) Horia Tecău | 8 |
| 21. | (United States) Bob Bryan (United States) Mike Bryan | 3; 3 | Cincinnati, United States | Hard | SF | 7–5, 6–7^{(5–7)}, [10–2] | (Romania) Horia Tecău | 8 |
2013
| 22. | (Spain) Marcel Granollers (Spain) Marc López | 5; 3 | Rotterdam, Netherlands | Hard (i) | SF | 6–2, 7–6^{(12–10)} | (Serbia) Nenad Zimonjić | 9 |
| 23. | (United States) Bob Bryan (United States) Mike Bryan | 1; 1 | Montreal, Canada | Hard | QF | 6–7^{(2–7)}, 6–3, [10–5] | (Canada) Daniel Nestor | 11 |
| 24. | (Canada) Daniel Nestor (India) Leander Paes | 15; 7 | Shanghai, China | Hard | 2R | 7–5, 3–6, [13–11] | (Canada) Vasek Pospisil | 17 |
2014
| 25. | (Croatia) Ivan Dodig (Brazil) Marcelo Melo | 7; 5 | Australian Open, Australia | Hard | 3R | 5–7, 6–4, 6–4 | (Poland) Łukasz Kubot | 20 |
| 26. | (Israel) Jonathan Erlich (Brazil) Marcelo Melo | 84; 5 | French Open, Paris, France | Clay | 3R | 6–4, 7–6^{(7–5)} | (Poland) Łukasz Kubot | 14 |
| 27. | (Croatia) Ivan Dodig (Brazil) Marcelo Melo | 8; 6 | Cincinnati, United States | Hard | 2R | 6–2, 6–4 | (Poland) Marcin Matkowski | 18 |
| 28. | (United States) Bob Bryan (United States) Mike Bryan | 1; 1 | ATP Finals, London, United Kingdom | Hard (i) | RR | 7–6^{(7–3)}, 6–3 | (Poland) Łukasz Kubot | 17 |
| 29. | (Austria) Alexander Peya (Brazil) Bruno Soares | 8; 8 | ATP Finals, London, United Kingdom | Hard (i) | RR | 6–4, 3–6, [10–6] | (Poland) Łukasz Kubot | 17 |
2015
| 30. | (Pakistan) Aisam-ul-Haq Qureshi (Serbia) Nenad Zimonjić | 37; 3 | Sydney, Australia | Hard | QF | 6–4, 6–3 | (Poland) Marcin Matkowski | 13 |
| 31. | (Croatia) Ivan Dodig (Brazil) Marcelo Melo | 4; 3 | US Open, New York, United States | Hard | 1R | 7–6^{(7–3)}, 5–7, 6–4 | (United Kingdom) Dominic Inglot | 32 |
| 32. | (India) Rohan Bopanna (Romania) Florin Mergea | 10; 12 | US Open, New York, United States | Hard | QF | 7–6^{(7–2)}, 6–3 | (United Kingdom) Dominic Inglot | 32 |
2016
| 33. | (Netherlands) Jean-Julien Rojer (Romania) Horia Tecău | 11; 9 | US Open, New York, United States | Hard | 3R | 6–3, 7–6^{(7–4)} | (Pakistan) Aisam-ul-Haq Qureshi | 32 |
| 34. | (Croatia) Ivan Dodig (Serbia) Nenad Zimonjić | 8; 54 | Basel, Switzerland | Hard (i) | 1R | 7–6^{(7–3)}, 6–3 | (New Zealand) Michael Venus | 37 |
| 35. | (Netherlands) Jean-Julien Rojer (Romania) Horia Tecău | 10; 9 | Basel, Switzerland | Hard (i) | SF | 1–6, 6–3, [10–8] | (New Zealand) Michael Venus | 37 |
2017
| 36. | (United States) Bob Bryan (United States) Mike Bryan | 6; 6 | French Open, Paris, France | Clay | 2R | 7–6^{(7–4)}, 6–3 | (Australia) Sam Groth | 46 |
| 37. | (United Kingdom) Jamie Murray (Brazil) Bruno Soares | 5; 6 | Wimbledon, London, United Kingdom | Grass | 2R | 4–6, 6–3, 4–6, 7–5, 7–5 | (Australia) Sam Groth | 35 |
2019
| 38. | (United States) Bob Bryan (United States) Mike Bryan | 14; 1 | Brisbane, Australia | Hard | 1R | 3–6, 6–4, [10–7] | (Canada) Milos Raonic | 46 |
| 39. | (United Kingdom) Jamie Murray (Brazil) Bruno Soares | 5; 6 | Acapulco, Mexico | Hard | 1R | 6–2, 7–6^{(7–4)} | (United States) Frances Tiafoe | 52 |
| 40. | (France) Nicolas Mahut (France) Édouard Roger-Vasselin | 7; 27 | Metz, France | Hard (i) | F | 2–6, 7–6^{(7–1)}, [10–4] | (Germany) Jan-Lennard Struff | 70 |

== World TeamTennis ==
Lindstedt enters his third season with World TeamTennis in 2020, after making his debut with the Washington Kastles in 2018, and playing a season with the Springfield Lasers in 2019. It was announced he will be returning to the Springfield Lasers during the 2020 WTT season set to begin 12 July.
