= Complexe Al Amal =

Tennis complex in Casablanca, Morocco

Coordinates: 33.588134°N 7.625837°W

Complexe al-Amal
- Interactive map of Complexe al-Amal
- Location: Casablanca, Morocco
- Capacity: 5,500
- Surface: Clay, Outdoors (6,000 m²)

Construction
- Groundbreaking: ?
- Opened: ?
- Cost: ?
- Architect: Abdelrhani Fenjiro

Tenants
- Grand Prix Hassan II (250 series) (1986-2015); Davis Cup (Morocco vs Great Britain) (Sep 2003)

The Complexe Al Amal is a tennis complex in Casablanca, Morocco. The complex is the host of the annual ATP Tour stop, the Grand Prix Hassan II. The stadium court has a capacity of 5,500 people.

== See also ==
- List of tennis stadiums by capacity
