= Grand Prix Hassan II =

- 2026 Grand Prix Hassan II

ATP Tour
- Founded: 1984
- Location: Casablanca (1984–2015); Marrakesh (2016–present); Morocco
- Venue: Complexe Al Amal (1984-2015); Royal Tennis Club de Marrakech (2016-present)
- Category: ATP Tour 250 series / ATP International Series / ATP World Series / (1990–current); Challenger Series (1986–1989)
- Surface: Clay / outdoors
- Draw: 32S / 16D
- Prize money: €562,815 (2024)
- Website: website

Current champions (2025)
- Singles: (Italy) Luciano Darderi
- Doubles: (Czech Republic) Petr Nouza (Czech Republic) Patrik Rikl

The Grand Prix Hassan II is an annual ATP Tour tennis tournament currently part of the ATP 250 series. The event is played on clay courts. It was held annually at the Complexe Al Amal in Casablanca, Morocco through 2015, before relocating to Marrakesh in 2016. Between 1984 and 1989 it was part of the Challenger Series. It is currently the only ATP event held in Africa. The tournament is usually held in April though it has been held in March before and is a lead up tournament for the French Open.

== Past finals ==
=== Key ===
ATP Tour
Challenger

=== Singles ===
Location	Year	Champion	Runners-up	Score
Marrakesh	2026	(Spain) Rafael Jódar	(Argentina) Marco Trungelliti	6–3, 6–2
Marrakesh	2025	(Italy) Luciano Darderi	(Netherlands) Tallon Griekspoor	7–6^{(7–3)}, 7–6^{(7–4)}
Marrakesh	2024	(Italy) Matteo Berrettini	(Spain) Roberto Carballés Baena	7–5, 6–2
Marrakesh	2023	(Spain) Roberto Carballés Baena	(France) Alexandre Müller	4–6, 7–6^{(7–3)}, 6–2
Marrakesh	2022	(Belgium) David Goffin	(Slovakia) Alex Molčan	3–6, 6–3, 6–3
Marrakesh	2021–2020	Cancelled due to the COVID-19 pandemic.		
Marrakesh	2019	(France) Benoît Paire	(Spain) Pablo Andújar	6–2, 6–3
Marrakesh	2018	(Spain) Pablo Andújar	(United Kingdom) Kyle Edmund	6–2, 6–2
Marrakesh	2017	(Croatia) Borna Ćorić	(Germany) Philipp Kohlschreiber	5–7, 7–6^{(7–3)}, 7–5
Marrakesh	2016	(Argentina) Federico Delbonis	(Croatia) Borna Ćorić	6–2, 6–4
Casablanca	2015	(Slovakia) Martin Kližan	(Spain) Daniel Gimeno-Traver	6–2, 6–2
Casablanca	2014	(Spain) Guillermo Garcia-Lopez	(Spain) Marcel Granollers	5–7, 6–4, 6–3
Casablanca	2013	(Spain) Tommy Robredo	(South Africa) Kevin Anderson	7–6^{(8–6)}, 4–6, 6–3
Casablanca	2012	(Spain) Pablo Andújar	(Spain) Albert Ramos	6–1, 7–6^{(7–5)}
Casablanca	2011	(Spain) Pablo Andújar	(Italy) Potito Starace	6–1, 6–2
Casablanca	2010	(Switzerland) Stan Wawrinka	(Romania) Victor Hănescu	6–2, 6–3
Casablanca	2009	(Spain) Juan Carlos Ferrero	(France) Florent Serra	6–4, 7–5
Casablanca	2008	(France) Gilles Simon	(France) Julien Benneteau	7–5, 6–2
Casablanca	2007	(France) Paul-Henri Mathieu	(Spain) Álbert Montañés	6–1, 6–1
Casablanca	2006	(Italy) Daniele Bracciali	(Chile) Nicolás Massú	6–1, 6–4
Casablanca	2005	(Argentina) Mariano Puerta	(Argentina) Juan Mónaco	6–4, 6–1
Casablanca	2004	(Spain) Santiago Ventura	(Slovakia) Dominik Hrbatý	6–3, 1–6, 6–4
Casablanca	2003	(France) Julien Boutter	(Morocco) Younes El Aynaoui	6–2, 2–6, 6–1
Casablanca	2002	(Morocco) Younes El Aynaoui	(Argentina) Guillermo Cañas	3–6, 6–3, 6–2
Casablanca	2001	(Argentina) Guillermo Cañas	(Spain) Tommy Robredo	7–5, 6–2
Casablanca	2000	(Spain) Fernando Vicente	(France) Sébastien Grosjean	6–4, 4–6, 7–6
Casablanca	1999	(Spain) Alberto Martín	(Spain) Fernando Vicente	6–3, 6–4
Casablanca	1998	(Italy) Andrea Gaudenzi	(Spain) Álex Calatrava	6–4, 5–7, 6–4
Casablanca	1997	(Morocco) Hicham Arazi	(Argentina) Franco Squillari	3–6, 6–1, 6–2
Casablanca	1996	(Spain) Tomás Carbonell	(Austria) Gilbert Schaller	7–5, 1–6, 6–2
Casablanca	1995	(Austria) Gilbert Schaller	(Spain) Albert Costa	6–4, 6–2
Casablanca	1994	(Italy) Renzo Furlan	(Morocco) Karim Alami	6–2, 6–2
Casablanca	1993	(Argentina) Guillermo Pérez Roldán	(Morocco) Younes El Aynaoui	6–4, 6–3
Casablanca	1992	(Argentina) Guillermo Pérez Roldán	(Spain) Germán López	2–6, 7–5, 6–3
Casablanca	1991	Not held		
Casablanca	1990	(Austria) Thomas Muster	(Argentina) Guillermo Pérez Roldán	6–1, 6–7, 6–2
Casablanca	1989	(Soviet Union) Andres Võsand	(Netherlands) Mark Koevermans	3–6, 7–6, 6–0
Casablanca	1988	(Argentina) Franco Davín	(Spain) Jordi Arrese	6–3, 2–6, 6–4
Casablanca	1987	(France) Tarik Benhabiles	(Argentina) Francisco Yunis	6–2, 7–5
Casablanca	1986	(Spain) David De Miguel	(France) Thierry Champion	6–2, 6–3
Casablanca	1985	(United States) Ronald Agenor	(Germany) Ricki Osterthun	2–6, 6–3, 6–4
Casablanca	1984	(Chile) Hans Gildemeister	(United States) Blaine Willenborg	6–7, 6–2, 6–1

=== Doubles ===
Location	Year	Champion	Runners-up	Score
Marrakesh	2026	(United States) Robert Cash/ (United States) JJ Tracy	(United States) Vasil Kirkov/ (Netherlands) Bart Stevens	6–2, 6–3
Marrakesh	2025	(Czech Republic) Petr Nouza (Czech Republic) Patrik Rikl	(Monaco) Hugo Nys (France) Édouard Roger-Vasselin	6–3, 6–4
Marrakesh	2024	(Finland) Harri Heliövaara (United Kingdom) Henry Patten	(Austria) Alexander Erler (Austria) Lucas Miedler	3–6, 6–4, [10–4]
Marrakesh	2023	(Brazil) Marcelo Demoliner (Italy) Andrea Vavassori	(Austria) Alexander Erler (Austria) Lucas Miedler	6–4, 3–6, [12–10]
Marrakesh	2022	(Brazil) Rafael Matos (Spain) David Vega Hernández	(Italy) Andrea Vavassori (Poland) Jan Zieliński	6–1, 7–5
Marrakesh	2021-2020	Cancelled due to the COVID-19 pandemic.		
Marrakesh	2019	(Austria) Jürgen Melzer (Croatia) Franko Škugor	(Netherlands) Matwé Middelkoop (Denmark) Frederik Nielsen	6–4, 7–6^{(8–6)}
Marrakesh	2018	(Croatia) Nikola Mektić (Austria) Alexander Peya	(France) Benoît Paire (France) Édouard Roger-Vasselin	7–5, 3–6, [10–7]
Marrakesh	2017	(United Kingdom) Dominic Inglot (Croatia) Mate Pavić	(Spain) Marcel Granollers (Spain) Marc López	6–4, 2–6, [11–9]
Marrakesh	2016	(Argentina) Guillermo Durán (Argentina) Máximo González	(Croatia) Marin Draganja (Pakistan) Aisam-ul-Haq Qureshi	6–2, 3–6, [10–6]
Casablanca	2015	(Australia) Rameez Junaid (Canada) Adil Shamasdin	(India) Rohan Bopanna (Romania) Florin Mergea	3–6, 6–2, [10–7]
Casablanca	2014	(Netherlands) Jean-Julien Rojer (Romania) Horia Tecău	(Poland) Tomasz Bednarek (Czech Republic) Lukáš Dlouhý	6–2, 6–2
Casablanca	2013	(Austria) Julian Knowle (Slovakia) Filip Polášek	(Germany) Dustin Brown (Germany) Christopher Kas	6–3, 6–2
Casablanca	2012	(Germany) Dustin Brown (Australia) Paul Hanley	(Italy) Daniele Bracciali (Italy) Fabio Fognini	7–5, 6–3
Casablanca	2011	(Sweden) Robert Lindstedt (Romania) Horia Tecău	(United Kingdom) Colin Fleming (Slovakia) Igor Zelenay	6–2, 6–1
Casablanca	2010	(Sweden) Robert Lindstedt (Romania) Horia Tecău	(India) Rohan Bopanna (Pakistan) Aisam-ul-Haq Qureshi	6–2, 3–6, [10–7]
Casablanca	2009	(Poland) Łukasz Kubot (Austria) Oliver Marach	(Sweden) Simon Aspelin (Australia) Paul Hanley	7–6 (7–4), 3–6, [10–6]
Casablanca	2008	(Spain) Albert Montañés (Spain) Santiago Ventura	(United States) James Cerretani (Australia) Todd Perry	6–1, 6–2
Casablanca	2007	(Australia) Jordan Kerr (Czech Republic) David Škoch	(Poland) Łukasz Kubot (Austria) Oliver Marach	7–6, 1–6, [10–4]
Casablanca	2006	(Austria) Julian Knowle (Austria) Jürgen Melzer	(Germany) Michael Kohlmann (Germany) Alexander Waske	6–3, 6–4
Casablanca	2005	(Czech Republic) František Čermák (Czech Republic) Leoš Friedl	(Argentina) Martín García (Peru) Luis Horna	6–4, 6–3
Casablanca	2004	(Italy) Enzo Artoni (Spain) Fernando Vicente	(Switzerland) Yves Allegro (Germany) Michael Kohlmann	3–6, 6–0, 6–4
Casablanca	2003	(Czech Republic) František Čermák (Czech Republic) Leoš Friedl	(United States) Devin Bowen (Australia) Ashley Fisher	6–3, 7–5
Casablanca	2002	(Australia) Stephen Huss (South Africa) Myles Wakefield	(Argentina) Martín García (Argentina) Luis Lobo	6–4, 6–2
Casablanca	2001	(Australia) Michael Hill (United States) Jeff Tarango	(Argentina) Pablo Albano (Australia) David Macpherson	7–6, 6–3
Casablanca	2000	(France) Arnaud Clément (France) Sébastien Grosjean	(Germany) Lars Burgsmüller (Australia) Andrew Painter	7–6, 6–4
Casablanca	1999	(Brazil) Fernando Meligeni (Brazil) Jaime Oncins	(Italy) Massimo Ardinghi (Italy) Vincenzo Santopadre	6–2, 6–3
Casablanca	1998	(Italy) Andrea Gaudenzi (Italy) Diego Nargiso	(Italy) Cristian Brandi (Italy) Filippo Messori	6–4, 7–6
Casablanca	1997	(Portugal) João Cunha e Silva (Portugal) Nuno Marques	(Morocco) Karim Alami (Morocco) Hicham Arazi	7–6, 6–2
Casablanca	1996	(Czech Republic) Jiří Novák (Czech Republic) David Rikl	(Spain) Tomás Carbonell (Spain) Francisco Roig	7–6, 6–3
Casablanca	1995	(Spain) Tomás Carbonell (Spain) Francisco Roig	(Portugal) Emanuel Couto (Portugal) João Cunha e Silva	6–4, 6–1
Casablanca	1994	(South Africa) David Adams (Netherlands) Menno Oosting	(Italy) Cristian Brandi (Italy) Federico Mordegan	6–3, 6–4
Casablanca	1993	(United States) Mike Bauer (South Africa) Piet Norval	(Latvia) Ģirts Dzelde (Croatia) Goran Prpić	7–5, 7–6
Casablanca	1992	(Argentina) Horacio de la Peña (Mexico) Jorge Lozano	(Commonwealth of Independent States) Ģirts Dzelde (United States) T. J. Middleton	2–6, 6–4, 7–6
Casablanca	1991	Not held		
Casablanca	1990	(Australia) Todd Woodbridge (Australia) Simon Youl	(Netherlands) Paul Haarhuis (Netherlands) Mark Koevermans	6–3, 6–1
Casablanca	1989	(Czechoslovakia) Jaroslav Bulant (Czechoslovakia) Richard Vogel	(Belgium) Libor Pimek (Romania) Florin Segărceanu	6–1, 6–3
Casablanca	1988	(Czechoslovakia) Josef Čihák (Czechoslovakia) Cyril Suk	(France) Arnaud Boetsch (Belgium) Denis Langaskens	6–2, 6–0
Casablanca	1987	(Spain) José López-Maeso (Spain) Alberto Tous	(Italy) Massimo Cierro (Italy) Alessandro de Minicis	7–6, 6–2
Casablanca	1986	(Mexico) Agustín Moreno (United States) Larry Scott	(West Germany) Tore Meinecke (West Germany) Ricki Osterthun	7–5, 6–2
