= Reda El Amrani =

Moroccan tennis player (born 1988)

- Country (sports): Morocco
- Residence: Mohammedia, Morocco
- Born: 19 May 1988 (age 37) Casablanca, Morocco
- Height: 1.85 m (6 ft 1 in)
- Turned pro: 2006
- Retired: June 2017 (last match played)
- Plays: Right-handed (one-handed backhand)
- Prize money: US$166,299

Singles
- Career record: 10–9
- Career titles: 0
- Highest ranking: No. 160 (7 June 2010)

Grand Slam singles results
- Australian Open: Q2 (2011)
- French Open: Q1 (2010, 2011)
- Wimbledon: Q1 (2010)
- US Open: Q1 (2010)

Doubles
- Career record: 3–11
- Career titles: 0
- Highest ranking: No. 437 (24 March 2008)
- Last updated on: 20 August 2017.

Reda El Amrani (born 19 May 1988) is a former professional tennis player from Morocco. He has a career high-ranking of world No. 160 achieved in June 2010.

== Career finals: 19 (13–6) ==
=== Singles: 11 (8–3) ===
Legend
Challengers (0–0)
Futures (8–3)

Outcome	No.	Date	Tournament	Surface	Opponent in the final	Score in the final
Runner-up	1.	May 14, 2007	Algeria F2	Clay	(Algeria) Lamine Ouahab	4–6, 3–6
Runner-up	2.	April 6, 2007	Tunisia F1	Clay	(Morocco) Mehdi Ziadi	6–7^{(7)}, 4–6
Winner	3.	June 11, 2007	Tunisia F2	Clay	(France) Charles Roche	6–4, 6–2
Runner-up	4.	December 10, 2007	Nigeria F3	Hard	(Netherlands) Boy Westerhof	3–6, 4–6
Winner	5.	September 1, 2008	Italy F29	Clay	(Italy) Alessandro Accardo	1–6, 7–5, 6–0
Winner	6.	March 23, 2008	Egypt F4	Clay	(Russia) Andrey Kuznetsov	1–6, 6–1, 6–1
Winner	7.	June 1, 2008	Tunisia F1	Clay	(Tunisia) Malek Jaziri	6–0, 6–3
Winner	8.	June 8, 2008	Tunisia F2	Clay	(France) Frédéric Jeanclaude	4–3, ret.
Winner	9.	June 15, 2009	Morocco F3	Clay	(Morocco) Mounir El Aarej	3–6, 7–5, 7–5
Winner	10.	October 12, 2009	Nigeria F1	Hard	(Netherlands) Boy Westerhof	6–3, 6–3
Winner	11.	October 19, 2009	Nigeria F2	Hard	(Israel) Gilad Ben Zvi	6–3, 6–3

=== Doubles: 8 (5–3) ===
Legend
Challengers (0–0)
Futures (5–3)

Outcome	No.	Date	Tournament	Surface	Partner	Opponents in the final	Score in final
Winner	1.	October 23, 2006	Ghana F1	Clay	(Morocco) Anas Fattar	(Nigeria) Abdul-Mumin Babalola (Togo) Komlavi Loglo	4–6, 6–3, 6–4
Winner	2.	June 4, 2007	Tunisia F1	Clay	(Morocco) Younès Rachidi	(France) Romain Hardy (France) Frédéric Jeanclaude	6–4, 6–2
Runner-up	3.	August 6, 2007	Italy F26	Clay	(Morocco) Mehdi Ziadi	(Italy) Massimo Capone (Italy) Luca Vanni	3–6, 0–6
Runner-up	4.	September 3, 2007	Egypt F7	Clay	(Morocco) Younès Rachidi	(Egypt) Mohamed Mamoun (Egypt) Sherif Sabry	6–7^{(5)}, 2–6
Runner-up	5.	September 10, 2007	Egypt F8	Clay	(Morocco) Younès Rachidi	(Egypt) Karim Maamoun (Egypt) Mohamed Mamoun	4–6, 3–6
Winner	6.	March 3, 2008	Morocco F2	Clay	(Morocco) Rabie Chaki	(Morocco) Mohamed Saber (Morocco) Mehdi Ziadi	6–3, 6–2
Winner	7.	June 8, 2009	Tunisia F2	Clay	(France) Alexandre Penaud	(France) Rudy Coco (France) Jean-Noel Insausti	2–6, 6–4, [10–8]
Winner	8.	October 12, 2009	Nigeria F1	Clay	(Morocco) Anas Fattar	(Togo) Komlavi Loglo (Ivory Coast) Valentin Sanon	6–4, 3–6, [10–3]

=== Style of play ===
Reda El Amrani has a powerful serve, he can easily reach 200 kilometres per hour (120 mph). He usually hits approximately 10 aces per match. He sometimes hits a lot of double faults. He has a good forehand, as he hits it spinny most of the time but sometimes flat; he won this way against 2 top 100 players. He has a one handed backhand. He also uses a lot of dropshots. He has had numerous injuries, like a knee injury in 2011.

== Best results ==
=== 2010 ===
250 Series: Quarterfinalist Grand Prix Hassan II (Casablanca).

Challenger Series: Finalist Rome-3, Finalist Bogotá-2, Semi-Finalist Alessandria, Quarter-finalist Blumenau.

=== 2009 ===
Futures Series: Winner: Nigeria F2, Nigeria F1, Morocco F3, Tunisia F2, Tunisia F1.

=== 2008 ===
Futures Series: Winner: Italy F29, Egypt F4, Tunisia F1, Tunisia F2.

=== 2007 ===
Futures Series: Winner: Tunisia F2.
