= Mehdi Ziadi =

Moroccan tennis player

- Country (sports): Morocco
- Born: 20 September 1986 (age 39) Rabat, Morocco
- Plays: Right-handed (two-handed backhand)
- Prize money: $88,867

Singles
- Career record: 0–9 (at ATP Tour level, Grand Slam level, and in Davis Cup)
- Career titles: 0
- Highest ranking: No. 531 (5 November 2007)

Doubles
- Career record: 11–12 (at ATP Tour level, Grand Slam level, and in Davis Cup)
- Career titles: 0
- Highest ranking: No. 408 (2 March 2009)
- Last updated on: 21 October 2019.

Mehdi Ziadi (born 20 September 1986) is a former Moroccan tennis player.

Ziadi has a career high ATP singles ranking of 531 achieved on 5 November 2007. He also has a career high ATP doubles ranking of 408 achieved on 2 March 2009.

Ziadi made his ATP main draw debut at the 2004 Grand Prix Hassan II.

Ziadi represents Morocco at the Davis Cup, where he has a W/L record of 12–9.
