= 1999 Campionati Internazionali di Sicilia =

- Date: 4–10 October
- Edition: 21st
- Category: World Series
- Draw: 32S / 16D
- Prize money: $325,000
- Surface: Clay / outdoor
- Location: Palermo, Italy

Champions

Singles
- (France) Arnaud di Pasquale

Doubles
- (Argentina) Mariano Hood / (Argentina) Sebastián Prieto
← 1998 ·	Campionati Internazionali di Sicilia	· 2000 →

The 1999 Campionati Internazionali di Sicilia was a men's tennis tournaments played on outdoor clay courts in Palermo, Italy that was part of the World Series of the 1999 ATP Tour. It was the 21st edition of the tournament and was held from 4 October until 10 October 1999. Unseeded Arnaud di Pasquale won the singles title.

== Finals ==
=== Singles ===
(France) Arnaud Di Pasquale defeated (Spain) Alberto Berasategui 6–1, 6–3

- It was di Pasquale's only singles title of his career.

=== Doubles ===
(Argentina) Mariano Hood / (Argentina) Sebastián Prieto defeated (South Africa) Lan Bale / (Spain) Alberto Martín 6–3, 6–1
