= 1999 Campionati Internazionali di Sicilia – Doubles =

Doubles
- 1999 Campionati Internazionali di Sicilia

Final
- Champions: (Argentina) Mariano Hood (Argentina) Sebastián Prieto
- Runners-up: (South Africa) Lan Bale (Spain) Alberto Martín
- Score: 6–3, 6–1

Events
Singles	Doubles
← 1998 ·	Campionati Internazionali di Sicilia	· 2000 →

Donald Johnson and Francisco Montana were the defending champions, but Johnson chose to compete at Basel in the same week. Montana teamed up with Nebojša Đorđević and lost in the first round to Pablo Albano and Guillermo Cañas.

Mariano Hood and Sebastián Prieto won the title by defeating Lan Bale and Alberto Martín 6–3, 6–1 in the final.

== Seeds ==
1. (Spain) Tomás Carbonell / (Spain) Javier Sánchez (first round)
2. (Brazil) Jaime Oncins / (Argentina) Daniel Orsanic (first round)
3. (Italy) Massimo Bertolini / (Italy) Cristian Brandi (first round)
4. (Argentina) Mariano Hood / (Argentina) Sebastián Prieto (champions)

== Draw ==
=== Key ===
- Q = Qualifier
- WC = Wild card
- LL = Lucky loser
- Alt = Alternate
- ITF = ITF entry
- PR = Protected ranking
- SR = Special ranking
- SE = Special exempt
- JE = Junior exempt
- JR = Junior Accelerator Programme entrant
- CO = College Accelerator Programme entrant
- NG = Next Gen Accelerator Program entrant
- w/o = Walkover
- r = Retired
- d = Defaulted

=== Draw ===
First round
1	(Spain) T Carbonell (Spain) J Sánchez	4	6	3
(Spain) E Nicolás (Spain) G Puentes	6	0	6
Q	(Spain) JI Carrasco (Spain) J Velasco Jr.	3	3
(South Africa) L Bale (Spain) A Martín	6	6
3	(Italy) M Bertolini (Italy) C Brandi	1	0
(Argentina) L Arnold Ker (Argentina) M García	6	6
WC	(Italy) M Ardinghi (Italy) D Sanguinetti	4	6	6
(Spain) A Portas (Belgium) T Vanhoudt	6	3	4
WC	(Spain) A Berasategui (Spain) F Roig	6	6
(Czech Republic) P Pála (Czech Republic) P Vízner	3	2
(Argentina) D del Río (Argentina) M Rodríguez	6	4	2
4	(Argentina) M Hood (Argentina) S Prieto	1	6	6
(Argentina) P Albano (Argentina) G Cañas	6^{3}	6	6
(Federal Republic of Yugoslavia) N Đorđević (United States) F Montana	7^{7}	2	0
WC	(Italy) A Gaudenzi (Italy) D Nargiso	4	7^{7}	6
2	(Brazil) J Oncins (Argentina) D Orsanic	6	6^{2}	4

Quarterfinals
(Spain) E Nicolás (Spain) G Puentes	2	3
(South Africa) L Bale (Spain) A Martín	6	6
(Argentina) L Arnold Ker (Argentina) M García	6	6
WC	(Italy) M Ardinghi (Italy) D Sanguinetti	1	0
WC	(Spain) A Berasategui (Spain) F Roig	4	6	3
4	(Argentina) M Hood (Argentina) S Prieto	6	1	6
(Argentina) P Albano (Argentina) G Cañas	3	4
WC	(Italy) A Gaudenzi (Italy) D Nargiso	6	6

Semifinals
(South Africa) L Bale (Spain) A Martín	6	7
(Argentina) L Arnold Ker (Argentina) M García	3	5
4	(Argentina) M Hood (Argentina) S Prieto	7^{7}	3	7
WC	(Italy) A Gaudenzi (Italy) D Nargiso	6^{5}	6	5

Final
(South Africa) L Bale (Spain) A Martín	3	1
4	(Argentina) M Hood (Argentina) S Prieto	6	6
