= 2000 Campionati Internazionali di Sicilia – Singles =

Tennis tournament

Singles
- 2000 Campionati Internazionali di Sicilia

Final
- Champion: (Belgium) Olivier Rochus
- Runner-up: (Italy) Diego Nargiso
- Score: 7–6^{(16–14)}, 6–1

Details
- Draw: 32 (3WC/4Q/1LL)
- Seeds: 8

Events
Singles	Doubles
← 1999 ·	Campionati Internazionali di Sicilia	· 2001 →

Arnaud Di Pasquale was the defending champion, but did not compete this year.

Olivier Rochus won the title by defeating Diego Nargiso 7–6^{(16–14)}, 6–1 in the final.

== Seeds ==
1. (Argentina) Mariano Puerta (second round, retired)
2. (Spain) Fernando Vicente (first round)
3. (n/a)
4. (Spain) Francisco Clavet (second round)
5. (Austria) Stefan Koubek (first round)
6. (Spain) Alberto Martín (quarterfinals)
7. (Spain) Albert Portas (second round)
8. (Spain) Álex Calatrava (second round)

== Draw ==
=== Key ===
- Q = Qualifier
- WC = Wild card
- LL = Lucky loser
- Alt = Alternate
- SE = Special exempt
- PR = Protected ranking
- ITF = ITF entry
- JE = Junior exempt
- w/o = Walkover
- r = Retired
- d = Defaulted
- SR = Special ranking

=== Finals ===
Semifinals
(Belgium) Olivier Rochus	7	6
(Belgium) Christophe Rochus	5	4
WC	(Italy) Diego Nargiso	6	6
(Spain) Sergi Bruguera	4	4

Final
(Belgium) Olivier Rochus	7^{16}	6
WC	(Italy) Diego Nargiso	6^{14}	1

=== Top half ===
First round
1	(Argentina) M Puerta	6	6
(Bulgaria) O Stanoytchev	1	3
(Germany) D Elsner	3	1
(Spain) D Sánchez	6	6
(Costa Rica) JA Marín	6	1	1
(Belgium) O Rochus	4	6	6
Q	(Austria) C Trimmel	2	2
8	(Spain) Á Calatrava	6	6
LL	(Argentina) S Prieto	2	6	6^{5}
(Spain) G Blanco	6	2	7^{7}
Q	(Argentina) M Charpentier	3	6	2
(Belgium) C Rochus	6	3	6
(Spain) J Balcells	6	6
(Spain) A Berasategui	1	2
(Argentina) H Gumy	6	6
5	(Austria) S Koubek	1	3

Second round
1	(Argentina) M Puerta	2	r
(Spain) D Sánchez	6
(Belgium) O Rochus	1	6	6
8	(Spain) Á Calatrava	6	3	2
(Spain) G Blanco	3	4
(Belgium) C Rochus	6	6
(Spain) J Balcells	6	6
(Argentina) H Gumy	4	4

Quarterfinals
(Spain) D Sánchez	7^{7}	3	2
(Belgium) O Rochus	6^{5}	6	6
(Belgium) C Rochus	7	7^{7}
(Spain) J Balcells	5	6^{5}

Semifinals
(Belgium) O Rochus	7	6
(Belgium) C Rochus	5	4

=== Bottom half ===
First round
6	(Spain) A Martín	6	6
(Brazil) F Meligeni	3	3
Q	(Argentina) M Hood	2	7^{7}	1
(Germany) M Hantschk	6	6^{5}	6
WC	(Italy) D Nargiso	7^{7}	6
(Romania) A Voinea	6^{0}	0
Q	(Russia) M Youzhny	2	4
4	(Spain) F Clavet	6	6
7	(Spain) A Portas	6	6
(Italy) A Gaudenzi	2	1
(Spain) S Bruguera	5	6	6
(Spain) E Benfele Álvarez	7	3	4
WC	(Italy) S Tarallo	6	6
WC	(Italy) F Luzzi	4	2
(France) S Huet	6	6
2	(Spain) F Vicente	3	1

Second round
6	(Spain) A Martín	6	6
(Germany) M Hantschk	3	1
WC	(Italy) D Nargiso	6^{3}	6	6
4	(Spain) F Clavet	7^{7}	2	3
7	(Spain) A Portas	6^{3}	5
(Spain) S Bruguera	7^{7}	7
WC	(Italy) S Tarallo	5	2
(France) S Huet	7	6

Quarterfinals
6	(Spain) A Martín	4	3
WC	(Italy) D Nargiso	6	6
(Spain) S Bruguera	4	6	7^{7}
(France) S Huet	6	3	6^{3}

Semifinals
WC	(Italy) D Nargiso	6	6
(Spain) S Bruguera	4	4
