= 2004 Grand Prix Hassan II – Singles =

Singles
- 2004 Grand Prix Hassan II

Final
- Champion: (Spain) Santiago Ventura
- Runner-up: (Slovakia) Dominik Hrbatý
- Score: 6–3, 1–6, 6–4

Events
Singles	Doubles
← 2003 ·	Grand Prix Hassan II	· 2005 →

Julien Boutter was the defending champion, but lost in the second round this year.

Santiago Ventura won the title, defeating Dominik Hrbatý 6–3, 1–6, 6–4 in the final. Notably, this was Ventura's first ATP Tour-level appearance.

== Seeds ==
1. (Slovakia) Dominik Hrbatý (final)
2. (Morocco) ~~Younes El Aynaoui~~ (withdrew)
3. (France) Antony Dupuis (quarterfinals)
4. (Spain) Rubén Ramírez Hidalgo (first round)
5. (France) Cyril Saulnier (second round)
6. (Netherlands) Dennis van Scheppingen (first round)
7. (France) Thierry Ascione (quarterfinals)
8. (Spain) Óscar Hernández (quarterfinals)

== Draw ==
=== Key ===
- Q = Qualifier
- WC = Wild card
- LL = Lucky loser
- Alt = Alternate
- ITF = ITF entry
- PR = Protected ranking
- SR = Special ranking
- SE = Special exempt
- JE = Junior exempt
- JR = Junior Accelerator Programme entrant
- CO = College Accelerator Programme entrant
- NG = Next Gen Accelerator Program entrant
- w/o = Walkover
- r = Retired
- d = Defaulted

=== Finals ===
Semifinals
1	(Slovakia) Dominik Hrbatý	6	6
(France) Julien Benneteau	2	2
(Belgium) Christophe Rochus	1	6	2
Q	(Spain) Santiago Ventura	6	1	6

Final
1	(Slovakia) Dominik Hrbatý	3	6	4
Q	(Spain) Santiago Ventura	6	1	6

=== Top half ===
First round
1	(Slovakia) D Hrbatý	6	6
(Germany) P Kohlschreiber	2	2
(Belgium) G Elseneer	3	6	4
(Spain) Á Calatrava	6	4	6
(Argentina) J-P Guzmán	6	6
(Philippines) E Taino	2	1
WC	(Morocco) M El Aarej	4	4
8	(Spain) Ó Hernández	6	6
4	(Spain) R Ramírez Hidalgo	4	2
(France) J Benneteau	6	6
(France) J Boutter	6	3	6
WC	(Morocco) M Ziadi	1	6	1
Q	(Croatia) Z Krajan	3	5
(Argentina) F Browne	6	7
WC	(Morocco) M Tahiri	3	4
7	(France) T Ascione	6	6

Second round
1	(Slovakia) D Hrbatý	5	6	6
(Spain) Á Calatrava	7	4	4
(Argentina) J-P Guzmán	4	6	6^{3}
8	(Spain) Ó Hernández	6	1	7^{7}
(France) J Benneteau	2	6	6
(France) J Boutter	6	3	4
(Argentina) F Browne	2	1^{r}
7	(France) T Ascione	6	3

Quarter-finals
1	(Slovakia) D Hrbatý	6	6
8	(Spain) Ó Hernández	3	0
(France) J Benneteau	6	6
7	(France) T Ascione	3	4

Semi-finals
1	(Slovakia) D Hrbatý	6	6
(France) J Benneteau	2	2

=== Bottom half ===
First round
5	(France) C Saulnier	6	6
(Italy) S Pescosolido	3	2
(Spain) F Vicente	5	1
(Belgium) C Rochus	7	6
(Spain) A Portas	6	7
(France) O Mutis	2	5
Q	(France) A di Pasquale	6^{7}	4
3	(France) A Dupuis	7^{9}	6
6	(Netherlands) D van Scheppingen	4	2
(Switzerland) I Heuberger	6	6
Q	(Italy) S Vagnozzi	7^{9}	6
(Monaco) J-R Lisnard	6^{7}	1
Q	(Spain) S Ventura	6	6
(Romania) R Sabău	2	3
(France) N Mahut	6	6
LL	(Sweden) B Rehnquist	1	2

Second round
5	(France) C Saulnier	0	3
(Belgium) C Rochus	6	6
(Spain) A Portas	6^{4}	6^{2}
3	(France) A Dupuis	7^{7}	7^{7}
(Switzerland) I Heuberger	6	6
Q	(Italy) S Vagnozzi	3	4
Q	(Spain) S Ventura	7^{7}	6
(France) N Mahut	6^{5}	4

Quarter-finals
(Belgium) C Rochus	6	6
3	(France) A Dupuis	3	1
(Switzerland) I Heuberger	2	4
Q	(Spain) S Ventura	6	6

Semi-finals
(Belgium) C Rochus	1	6	2
Q	(Spain) S Ventura	6	1	6
