= 1998 Campionati Internazionali di Sicilia – Singles =

Singles
- 1998 Campionati Internazionali di Sicilia

Final
- Champions: (Argentina) Mariano Puerta
- Runners-up: (Argentina) Franco Squillari
- Score: 6–3, 6–2

Details
- Draw: 32
- Seeds: 8

Events
Singles	Doubles
← 1997 ·	Campionati Internazionali di Sicilia	· 1999 →

The 1998 Campionati Internazionali di Sicilia was a men's tennis tournament played on Clay in Palermo, Italy that was part of the International Series of the 1998 ATP Tour. It was the seventeenth edition of the tournament and was held from 5 October – 11 October.

== Seeds ==
Champion seeds are indicated in bold text while text in italics indicates the round in which those seeds were eliminated.

1. (Spain) Àlex Corretja (semifinals)
2. (Spain) Alberto Berasategui (first round)
3. (Spain) Félix Mantilla (first round)
4. (Brazil) Gustavo Kuerten (second round)
5. (Spain) Francisco Clavet (second round)
6. (Slovakia) Dominik Hrbatý (second round)
7. (Italy) Davide Sanguinetti (first round)
8. (Spain) Carlos Costa (first round)

== Draw ==
=== Key ===
- Q = Qualifier
- WC = Wild card
- LL = Lucky loser
- Alt = Alternate
- ITF = ITF entry
- PR = Protected ranking
- SR = Special ranking
- SE = Special exempt
- JE = Junior exempt
- JR = Junior Accelerator Programme entrant
- CO = College Accelerator Programme entrant
- NG = Next Gen Accelerator Program entrant
- w/o = Walkover
- r = Retired
- d = Defaulted

=== Finals ===
Semifinals
1	(Spain) Àlex Corretja	5	2
**(Argentina) Mariano Puerta**	**7**	**6**
**(Argentina) Franco Squillari**	**6**	2	**7**
(Spain) Galo Blanco	1	**6**	6

Final
**(Argentina) Mariano Puerta**	**6**	**6**
(Argentina) Franco Squillari	3	2

=== Top half ===
First round
1	**(Spain) À Corretja**	**6**	2	**6**
(Spain) S Bruguera	0	**6**	0
**(Spain) A Portas**	**6**	**7**
(Romania) A Voinea	3	5
**(Ecuador) N Lapentti**	**6**	**7**
(Czech Republic) J Novák	3	5
**(Italy) M Valeri**	**7**	**6**
8	(Spain) C Costa	6	4
4	**(Brazil) G Kuerten**	**6**	4	**6**
(Argentina) G Cañas	3	**6**	2
**(Spain) F Vicente**	**7**	**6**
(Romania) D Pescariu	6	4
**(Argentina) M Puerta**	**7**	**6**
(Costa Rica) JA Marín	6	1
5	**(Spain) F Clavet**	**6**	**6**
(Ukraine) A Medvedev	2	2

Second round
1	**(Spain) À Corretja**	**6**	**6**
(Spain) A Portas	1	2
**(Ecuador) N Lapentti**	**7**	4
(Italy) M Valeri	6	1^{r}
4	(Brazil) G Kuerten	4	3
**(Spain) F Vicente**	**6**	**6**
**(Argentina) M Puerta**	**6**	4	**6**
5	(Spain) F Clavet	4	**6**	3

Quarterfinals
1	**(Spain) À Corretja**	**7**	**6**
(Ecuador) N Lapentti	5	2
(Spain) F Vicente	4	4
**(Argentina) M Puerta**	**6**	**6**

Semifinals
1	(Spain) À Corretja	5	2
**(Argentina) M Puerta**	**7**	**6**

=== Bottom half ===
First round
6	**(Slovakia) D Hrbatý**	**6**	**6**
(Germany) O Gross	3	4
**(Argentina) F Squillari**	**6**	**6**
(Italy) F Luzzi	2	3
**(Argentina) M Zabaleta**	**6**	4	**7**
(Spain) Ó Serrano	2	**6**	6
**(Italy) M Martelli**	**7**	**6**
3	(Spain) F Mantilla	6	3
**(Spain) G Blanco**	**6**	**6**
7	(Italy) D Sanguinetti	3	2
**(France) J-P Perlant**	**6**	**6**
(Spain) Á Calatrava	2	2
**(France) A Di Pasquale**	**6**	3
(Argentina) L Arnold	3	1^{r}
**(Spain) J Sánchez**	**6**	**6**
2	(Spain) A Berasategui	4	1

Second round
6	(Slovakia) D Hrbatý	4	**6**	4
**(Argentina) F Squillari**	**6**	2	**6**
**(Argentina) M Zabaleta**	**6**	**6**
(Italy) M Martelli	4	2
**(Spain) G Blanco**	**6**	**6**
(France) J-P Perlant	3	4
**(France) A Di Pasquale**	**6**	**7**
(Spain) J Sánchez	0	6

Quarterfinals
**(Argentina) F Squillari**	5	**6**	**6**
(Argentina) M Zabaleta	**7**	4	3
**(Spain) G Blanco**	**7**	**6**
(France) A Di Pasquale	6	2

Semifinals
**(Argentina) F Squillari**	**6**	2	**7**
(Spain) G Blanco	1	**6**	6
