= 2002 Grand Prix Hassan II – Doubles =

Doubles
- 2002 Grand Prix Hassan II

Final
- Champions: (Australia) Stephen Huss (South Africa) Myles Wakefield
- Runners-up: (Argentina) Martín García (Argentina) Luis Lobo
- Score: 6–4, 6–2

Events
Singles	Doubles
← 2001 ·	Grand Prix Hassan II	· 2003 →

Michael Hill and Jeff Tarango were the defending champions but they competed with different partners that year, Hill with Daniel Vacek and Tarango with David Adams.

Hill and Vacek lost in the first round to Martín García and Luis Lobo.

Adams and Tarango lost in the quarterfinals to Stephen Huss and Myles Wakefield.

Huss and Wakefield won in the final 6–4, 6–2 against García and Lobo.

== Seeds ==
1. (South Africa) David Adams / (United States) Jeff Tarango (quarterfinals)
2. (Australia) Michael Hill / (Czech Republic) Daniel Vacek (first round)
3. (South Africa) Robbie Koenig / (Germany) Michael Kohlmann (quarterfinals)
4. (South Africa) Marius Barnard / (United States) Jim Thomas (quarterfinals)

== Draw ==
=== Key ===
- Q = Qualifier
- WC = Wild card
- LL = Lucky loser
- Alt = Alternate
- SE = Special exempt
- PR = Protected ranking
- ITF = ITF entry
- JE = Junior exempt
- w/o = Walkover
- r = Retired
- d = Defaulted
- SR = Special ranking

First round
1	(South Africa) D Adams (United States) J Tarango	6	6
(Spain) D Sánchez (Spain) F Vicente	4	0
(Australia) S Huss (South Africa) M Wakefield	6	6
WC	(Morocco) J Chafai (Morocco) M Dakki	3	0
3	(South Africa) R Koenig (Germany) M Kohlmann	7^{7}	6
(Italy) E Artoni (Brazil) D Melo	6^{5}	4
(Argentina) G Cañas (Argentina) M Zabaleta	6	1^{r}
(Italy) M Bertolini (Argentina) A Schneiter	3	2
WC	(Morocco) K Alami (Morocco) Y El Aynaoui
(Czech Republic) F Čermák (Czech Republic) P Luxa	w/o
(North Macedonia) A Kitinov (Sweden) J Landsberg	5	6^{3}
4	(South Africa) M Barnard (United States) J Thomas	7	7^{7}
(Australia) P Hanley (Australia) N Healey	6	6
WC	(Morocco) H Arazi (Morocco) M El Aarej	4	0
(Argentina) M García (Argentina) L Lobo	7	7^{8}
2	(Australia) M Hill (Czech Republic) D Vacek	5	6^{6}

Quarterfinals
1	(South Africa) D Adams (United States) J Tarango	1	2
(Australia) S Huss (South Africa) M Wakefield	6	6
3	(South Africa) R Koenig (Germany) M Kohlmann	5	6	[4]
(Italy) M Bertolini (Argentina) A Schneiter	7	3	[10]
(Czech Republic) F Čermák (Czech Republic) P Luxa	6	6
4	(South Africa) M Barnard (United States) J Thomas	4	4
(Australia) P Hanley (Australia) N Healey	2	2
2	(Argentina) M García (Argentina) L Lobo	6	6

Semifinals
(Australia) S Huss (South Africa) M Wakefield	6	5
(Italy) M Bertolini (Argentina) A Schneiter	3	2^{r}
(Czech Republic) F Čermák (Czech Republic) P Luxa	4	6	[1]
(Argentina) M García (Argentina) L Lobo	6	2	[10]

Final
(Australia) S Huss (South Africa) M Wakefield	6	6
(Argentina) M García (Argentina) L Lobo	4	2
