= 2011 Savannah Challenger – Doubles =

Doubles
- 2011 Savannah Challenger

Final
- Champions: (South Africa) Rik de Voest (South Africa) Izak van der Merwe
- Runners-up: (United States) Sekou Bangoura (United States) Jesse Witten
- Score: 6–3, 6–3

Events
Singles	Doubles
- Savannah Challenger

British pair Jamie Baker and James Ward were the defending champions, but Baker didn't participate this year.
As a result, Ward played alongside Tomislav Perić. They reached the semifinals and were eliminated by Rik de Voest and Izak van der Merwe.
de Voest and van der Merwe went on to win the tournament after beating Sekou Bangoura and Jesse Witten 6–3, 6–3 in the final

== Seeds ==
1. (South Africa) Rik de Voest / (South Africa) Izak van der Merwe (champions)
2. (Australia) Ashley Fisher / (Australia) Stephen Huss (quarterfinals)
3. (United States) John Paul Fruttero / (Australia) Chris Guccione (first round)
4. (United States) Robert Kendrick / (United States) Donald Young (first round)

== Draw ==
Key

- Q = Qualifier
- WC = Wild card
- LL = Lucky loser
- Alt = Alternate
- ITF = ITF entry
- PR = Protected ranking
- SR = Special ranking
- SE = Special exempt
- JE = Junior exempt
- JR = Junior Accelerator Programme entrant
- CO = College Accelerator Programme entrant
- NG = Next Gen Accelerator Program entrant
- w/o = Walkover
- r = Retired
- d = Defaulted

=== Draw ===
First round
1	(South Africa) R de Voest (South Africa) I van der Merwe	6	6
(United States) L Cook (United States) Brett Joelson	1	1
(Canada) P Bester (Canada) Kamil Pajkowski	6	6
WC	(United States) Mark Oljaca (South Africa) W Whitehouse	2	2
3	(United States) JP Fruttero (Australia) C Guccione	6	2	[9]
(Philippines) R Gonzales (United States) Chris Kwon	4	6	[11]
(Argentina) JP Brzezicki (Dominican Republic) V Estrella	w/o
Q	(Croatia) T Perić (United Kingdom) J Ward
(Austria) N Moser (Brazil) F Romboli	4	2
WC	(United States) A Collarini (United States) D Kudla	6	6
(United States) S Bangoura (United States) J Witten	4	6	[10]
4	(United States) R Kendrick (United States) D Young	6	4	[8]
(Slovenia) L Gregorc (United States) M Yani	6	6^{5}	[10]
(Bosnia and Herzegovina) A Delić (United States) B Reynolds	0	7	[8]
WC	(United States) Taylor Fogleman (United States) Benjamin Rogers	4	2
2	(Australia) A Fisher (Australia) S Huss	6	6

Quarterfinals
1	(South Africa) R de Voest (South Africa) I van der Merwe
(Canada) P Bester (Canada) Kamil Pajkowski	w/o
(Philippines) R Gonzales (United States) Chris Kwon	3	4
Q	(Croatia) T Perić (United Kingdom) J Ward	6	6
WC	(United States) A Collarini (United States) D Kudla	6^{4}	4
(United States) S Bangoura (United States) J Witten	7	6
(Slovenia) L Gregorc (United States) M Yani	4	6	[10]
2	(Australia) A Fisher (Australia) S Huss	6	4	[4]

Semifinals
1	(South Africa) R de Voest (South Africa) I van der Merwe	6	6
Q	(Croatia) T Perić (United Kingdom) J Ward	2	4
(United States) S Bangoura (United States) J Witten
(Slovenia) L Gregorc (United States) M Yani	w/o

Final
1	(South Africa) R de Voest (South Africa) I van der Merwe	6	6
(United States) Sekou Bangoura (United States) J Witten	3	3
