= 2002 Grand Prix Hassan II – Singles =

Singles
- 2002 Grand Prix Hassan II

Final
- Champion: (Morocco) Younes El Aynaoui
- Runner-up: (Argentina) Guillermo Cañas
- Score: 3–6, 6–3, 6–2

Events
Singles	Doubles
- Grand Prix Hassan II

Guillermo Cañas was the defending champion but lost in the final 3–6, 6–3, 6–2 against Younes El Aynaoui.

== Seeds ==
1. (Argentina) Guillermo Cañas (final)
2. (Morocco) Younes El Aynaoui (champion)
3. (Morocco) Hicham Arazi (first round)
4. (Chile) Fernando González (first round)
5. (France) Julien Boutter (semifinals)
6. (Argentina) Mariano Zabaleta (first round)
7. (Belgium) Olivier Rochus (first round)
8. (Spain) Fernando Vicente (first round)

== Draw ==
Key

- Q = Qualifier
- WC = Wild card
- LL = Lucky loser
- Alt = Alternate
- ITF = ITF entry
- PR = Protected ranking
- SR = Special ranking
- SE = Special exempt
- JE = Junior exempt
- JR = Junior Accelerator Programme entrant
- CO = College Accelerator Programme entrant
- NG = Next Gen Accelerator Program entrant
- w/o = Walkover
- r = Retired
- d = Defaulted

=== Finals ===
Semifinals
1	(Argentina) Guillermo Cañas	7	6
5	(France) Julien Boutter	5	4
(Russia) Mikhail Youzhny	3	6^{2}
2	(Morocco) Younes El Aynaoui	6	7^{7}

Final
1	(Argentina) Guillermo Cañas	6	3	2
2	(Morocco) Younes El Aynaoui	3	6	6

=== Top half ===
First round
1	(Argentina) G Cañas	6^{5}	6	6
(Denmark) K Pless	7^{7}	3	4
Q	(France) A di Pasquale	3	7^{7}	2
(Brazil) A Sá	6	6^{2}	6
(Spain) S Bruguera	2	1^{r}
(Spain) D Sánchez	6	2
(Hungary) A Sávolt	6	7^{7}
8	(Spain) F Vicente	3	6^{3}
4	(Chile) F González	5	6	5
(Czech Republic) M Tabara	7	2	7
Q	(Monaco) J-R Lisnard	4	6	6
Q	(Italy) V Santopadre	6	3	1
(Australia) W Arthurs	6	6
(Russia) A Stoliarov	3	4
(Russia) N Davydenko	5	7^{11}	4
5	(France) J Boutter	7	6^{9}	6

Second round
1	(Argentina) G Cañas	7^{8}	6
(Brazil) A Sá	6^{6}	1
(Spain) D Sánchez	3	4
(Hungary) A Sávolt	6	6
(Czech Republic) M Tabara	3	2
Q	(Monaco) J-R Lisnard	6	6
(Australia) W Arthurs	4	6	3
5	(France) J Boutter	6	3	6

Quarter-finals
1	(Argentina) G Cañas	7^{7}	6
(Hungary) A Sávolt	6^{2}	3
Q	(Monaco) J-R Lisnard	6	4	6^{1}
5	(France) J Boutter	3	6	7^{7}

Semi-finals
1	(Argentina) G Cañas	7	6
5	(France) J Boutter	5	4

=== Bottom half ===
First round
6	(Argentina) M Zabaleta	1	4
(Germany) M Kohlmann	6	6
(Spain) Á Calatrava	5	6^{2}
(Russia) M Youzhny	7	7^{7}
(France) A Dupuis	6	3
(Germany) L Burgsmüller	2	1^{r}
WC	(Morocco) K Alami	7^{7}	6
WC/3	(Morocco) H Arazi	6^{5}	3
7	(Belgium) O Rochus	0	1
(Georgia (country)) I Labadze	6	6
(Czech Republic) J Vacek	1	2
Q	(France) P-H Mathieu	6	6
(Czech Republic) O Fukárek	6^{4}	2
WC	(Morocco) M El Aarej	7^{7}	6
(France) N Coutelot	2	6^{3}
2	(Morocco) Y El Aynaoui	6	7^{7}

Second round
(Germany) M Kohlmann	7	3	4
(Russia) M Youzhny	5	6	6
(France) A Dupuis	6	7
WC	(Morocco) K Alami	4	5
(Georgia (country)) I Labadze	1	5
Q	(France) P-H Mathieu	6	7
WC	(Morocco) M El Aarej	7^{7}	2	3
2	(Morocco) Y El Aynaoui	6^{4}	6	6

Quarter-finals
(Russia) M Youzhny	7^{7}	6
(France) A Dupuis	6^{5}	2
Q	(France) P-H Mathieu	6	4	6^{3}
2	(Morocco) Y El Aynaoui	2	6	7^{7}

Semi-finals
(Russia) M Youzhny	3	6^{2}
2	(Morocco) Y El Aynaoui	6	7^{7}
