= 1999 Campionati Internazionali di Sicilia – Singles =

Singles
- 1999 Campionati Internazionali di Sicilia

Final
- Champion: (France) Arnaud Di Pasquale
- Runner-up: (Spain) Alberto Berasategui
- Score: 6–1, 6–3

Details
- Draw: 32 (3WC/4Q)
- Seeds: 8

Events
Singles	Doubles
← 1998 ·	Campionati Internazionali di Sicilia	· 2000 →

Mariano Puerta was the defending champion, but lost in the second round to Albert Costa.

Arnaud Di Pasquale won the title by defeating Alberto Berasategui 6–1, 6–3 in the final.

== Seeds ==
1. (Spain) Àlex Corretja (quarterfinals)
2. (Spain) Albert Costa (semifinals, retired)
3. (Brazil) Fernando Meligeni (first round)
4. (Morocco) Younes El Aynaoui (second round)
5. (Argentina) Mariano Zabaleta (first round)
6. (Spain) Fernando Vicente (second round)
7. (Argentina) Franco Squillari (first round, retired)
8. (Spain) Juan Carlos Ferrero (second round)

== Draw ==
=== Key ===
- Q = Qualifier
- WC = Wild card
- LL = Lucky loser
- Alt = Alternate
- SE = Special exempt
- PR = Protected ranking
- ITF = ITF entry
- JE = Junior exempt
- w/o = Walkover
- r = Retired
- d = Defaulted
- SR = Special ranking

=== Finals ===
Semifinals
(France) Arnaud Di Pasquale	7^{8}	7
(Morocco) Karim Alami	6^{6}	5
(Spain) Alberto Berasategui	2	7^{7}	4
2	(Spain) Albert Costa	6	6^{3}	0^{r}

Final
(France) Arnaud Di Pasquale	6	6
(Spain) Alberto Berasategui	1	3

=== Top half ===
First round
1	(Spain) À Corretja	6	7
Q	(Spain) J Díaz	1	5
(Costa Rica) JA Marín	7	6
(Spain) A Portas	5	1
Q	(Spain) E Nicolás	3	0
(Germany) J Knippschild	6	6
(France) A Di Pasquale	6	4
7	(Argentina) F Squillari	4	1^{r}
4	(Morocco) Y El Aynaoui	6^{5}	6	6
WC	(Spain) J Alonso	7^{7}	2	2
Q	(Spain) JA Viloca	4	2
(Morocco) K Alami	6	6
(Austria) M Hipfl	6	7^{7}
Q	(Spain) D Sánchez	2	6^{5}
WC	(Italy) D Sanguinetti	6	7^{7}
5	(Argentina) M Zabaleta	4	6^{2}

Second round
1	(Spain) À Corretja	7^{7}	6
(Costa Rica) JA Marín	6^{4}	2
(Germany) J Knippschild	4	6	2
(France) A Di Pasquale	6	4	6
4	(Morocco) Y El Aynaoui	4	6	3
(Morocco) K Alami	6	3	6
(Austria) M Hipfl	6	6
WC	(Italy) D Sanguinetti	4	2

Quarterfinals
1	(Spain) À Corretja	4	6^{4}
(France) A Di Pasquale	6	7^{7}
(Morocco) K Alami	4	6	6
(Austria) M Hipfl	6	4	4

Semifinals
(France) A Di Pasquale	7^{8}	7
(Morocco) K Alami	6^{6}	5

=== Bottom half ===
First round
6	(Spain) F Vicente	6	6
(Italy) A Gaudenzi	4	2
(Spain) A Berasategui	2	6	6
(Argentina) M Rodríguez	6	2	1
(Argentina) G Cañas	0	4
(Argentina) G Gaudio	6	6
(Argentina) H Gumy	1	6	0
3	(Brazil) F Meligeni	6	3	3^{r}
8	(Spain) JC Ferrero	6^{1}	6	7
(Armenia) S Sargsian	7^{7}	0	5
WC	(Italy) D Nargiso	1	4
(Spain) A Martín	6	6
(Argentina) M Puerta	6	6
(Spain) G Blanco	4	3
(Uruguay) M Filippini	1	1
2	(Spain) A Costa	6	6

Second round
6	(Spain) F Vicente	6	6^{7}	5
(Spain) A Berasategui	4	7^{9}	7
(Argentina) G Gaudio	0	1
(Argentina) H Gumy	6	6
8	(Spain) JC Ferrero	3	2
(Spain) A Martín	6	6
(Argentina) M Puerta	2	6	4
2	(Spain) A Costa	6	3	6

Quarterfinals
(Spain) A Berasategui	6	6
(Argentina) H Gumy	3	4
(Spain) A Martín	6^{4}	3
2	(Spain) A Costa	7^{7}	6

Semifinals
(Spain) A Berasategui	2	7^{7}	4
2	(Spain) A Costa	6	6^{3}	0^{r}
