= 2005 Grand Prix Hassan II – Doubles =

Doubles
- 2005 Grand Prix Hassan II

Final
- Champions: (Czech Republic) František Čermák (Czech Republic) Leoš Friedl
- Runners-up: (Argentina) Martín García (Peru) Luis Horna
- Score: 6–4, 6–3

Events
Singles	Doubles
← 2004 ·	Grand Prix Hassan II	· 2006 →

Enzo Artoni and Fernando Vicente were the defending champions. Artoni partnered with Marcin Matkowski this year, losing in the quarterfinals. Vicente did not participate.

František Čermák and Leoš Friedl won in the final 6–4, 6–3, against Martín García and Luis Horna.

== Seeds ==
1. (Australia) Paul Hanley / (Australia) Todd Perry (semifinals)
2. (Czech Republic) František Čermák / (Czech Republic) Leoš Friedl (champions)
3. (Australia) Jordan Kerr / (Argentina) Sebastián Prieto (first round)
4. (France) Fabrice Santoro / (Germany) Rainer Schüttler (semifinals)

== Draw ==
=== Key ===
- Q = Qualifier
- WC = Wild card
- LL = Lucky loser
- Alt = Alternate
- SE = Special exempt
- PR = Protected ranking
- ITF = ITF entry
- JE = Junior exempt
- w/o = Walkover
- r = Retired
- d = Defaulted
- SR = Special ranking

=== Draw ===
First round
1	(Australia) P Hanley (Australia) T Perry	6	6
(Belgium) C Rochus (Belgium) T Vanhoudt	4	3
(Czech Republic) J Vaněk (Czech Republic) T Zíb	3	2
(Germany) F Mayer (Luxembourg) G Müller	6	6
3	(Australia) J Kerr (Argentina) S Prieto	6^{4}	3
(Argentina) M García (Peru) L Horna	7^{7}	6
WC	(France) A Clément (France) A Di Pasquale	7	4	2
(Italy) E Artoni (Poland) M Matkowski	5	6	6
(Australia) A Fisher (United States) T Phillips	7	2	6
(Poland) M Fyrstenberg (Spain) S Ventura	5	6	3
(Germany) L Burgsmüller (Argentina) M Puerta	1	3
4	(France) F Santoro (Germany) R Schüttler	6	6
(Argentina) J Acasuso (Argentina) J Mónaco	6	6
(Spain) A López Morón (Netherlands) R Wassen	2	4
WC	(Morocco) M El Aarej (Morocco) M Tahiri	1	1
2	(Czech Republic) F Čermák (Czech Republic) L Friedl	6	6

Quarterfinals
1	(Australia) P Hanley (Australia) T Perry	6	7
(Germany) F Mayer (Luxembourg) G Müller	2	5
(Argentina) M García (Peru) L Horna	6	6
(Italy) E Artoni (Poland) M Matkowski	4	3
(Australia) A Fisher (United States) T Phillips	5	6	2
4	(France) F Santoro (Germany) R Schüttler	7	3	6
(Argentina) J Acasuso (Argentina) J Mónaco	0	1
2	(Czech Republic) F Čermák (Czech Republic) L Friedl	6	6

Semifinals
1	(Australia) P Hanley (Australia) T Perry	4	6^{9}
(Argentina) M García (Peru) L Horna	6	7^{11}
4	(France) F Santoro (Germany) R Schüttler	2	3
2	(Czech Republic) F Čermák (Czech Republic) L Friedl	6	6

Final
(Argentina) M García (Peru) L Horna	4	3
2	(Czech Republic) F Čermák (Czech Republic) L Friedl	6	6
