= 2001 Stuttgart Open – Singles =

Singles
- 2001 Stuttgart Open
- 2000 Champion: (Argentina) Franco Squillari

Final
- Champion: (Brazil) Gustavo Kuerten
- Runner-up: (Argentina) Guillermo Cañas
- Score: 6–3, 6–2, 6–4

Details
- Draw: 48
- Seeds: 16

Events
| Singles | Doubles |
- Stuttgart Open

Franco Squillari was the defending champion but lost in the third round to Guillermo Cañas.

First-seeded Gustavo Kuerten won in the final 6–3, 6–2, 6–4 against Cañas.

== Seeds ==
A champion seed is indicated in bold text while text in italics indicates the round in which that seed was eliminated. All sixteen seeds received a bye to the second round.

1. (Brazil) **Gustavo Kuerten (champion)**
2. (Russia) Yevgeny Kafelnikov (quarterfinals)
3. (France) Arnaud Clément (third round)
4. (Slovakia) Dominik Hrbatý (third round)
5. (France) Fabrice Santoro (second round)
6. (Argentina) Franco Squillari (third round)
7. (Morocco) Hicham Arazi (second round)
8. (Argentina) Guillermo Coria (second round)
9. (Ecuador) Nicolás Lapentti (quarterfinals)
10. (Argentina) Guillermo Cañas (final)
11. (Sweden) Andreas Vinciguerra (second round)
12. (Czech Republic) Jiří Novák (semifinals)
13. (Spain) Alberto Martín (quarterfinals)
14. (Argentina) Gastón Gaudio (quarterfinals)
15. (Romania) Andrei Pavel (second round)
16. (Spain) Albert Costa (third round)

== Draw ==
Key

- Q = Qualifier
- WC = Wild card
- LL = Lucky loser
- Alt = Alternate
- ITF = ITF entry
- PR = Protected ranking
- SR = Special ranking
- SE = Special exempt
- JE = Junior exempt
- JR = Junior Accelerator Programme entrant
- CO = College Accelerator Programme entrant
- NG = Next Gen Accelerator Program entrant
- w/o = Walkover
- r = Retired
- d = Defaulted

=== Finals ===
Semifinals
1 | (Brazil) **Gustavo Kuerten** | 4 | **7^{7}** | **7**
12 | (Czech Republic) Jiří Novák | **6** | 6^{5} | 5
Q | (Spain) Marc López | 2 | 2
10 | (Argentina) **Guillermo Cañas** | **6** | **6**

Final
1 | (Brazil) **Gustavo Kuerten** | **6** | **6** | **6**
10 | (Argentina) Guillermo Cañas | 3 | 2 | 4

=== Top half ===
==== Section 1 ====
First round
(Australia) **A Ilie** | **6** | **6**
(Germany) L Burgsmüller | 1 | 3
(United States) M Russell | 2 | **7^{7}** | 3
(Spain) **T Robredo** | **6** | 6^{5} | **6**
Q | (Spain) F López | 6^{4} | 4
(Austria) **M Hipfl** | **7^{7}** | **6**
(Germany) C Vinck | 4 | 2
(Spain) **D Sánchez** | **6** | **6**

Second round
1 | (Brazil) **G Kuerten** | **6** | **6**
(Australia) A Ilie | 1 | 2
(Spain) **T Robredo** | 4 | **7^{7}** | **7^{12}**
15 | (Romania) A Pavel | **6** | 6^{5} | 6^{10}
9 | (Ecuador) **N Lapentti** | **6** | **6**
(Austria) M Hipfl | 2 | 3
(Spain) **D Sánchez** | **6** | **6**
5 | (France) F Santoro | 2 | 1

Third round
1 | (Brazil) **G Kuerten** | **6** | **6**
(Spain) T Robredo | 4 | 1
9 | (Ecuador) **N Lapentti** | **7** | **6**
(Spain) D Sánchez | 5 | 4

Quarterfinals
1 | (Brazil) **G Kuerten** | **6** | 6^{6} | **6**
9 | (Ecuador) N Lapentti | 4 | **7^{8}** | 3

==== Section 2 ====
First round
(Spain) **F Clavet** | 1 | **6** | **7^{7}**
(Spain) J Díaz | **6** | 1 | 6^{4}
WC | (Germany) J Záhlava | 2 | 4
(Switzerland) **M Rosset** | **6** | **6**
(Spain) **G Blanco** | **6** | **6**
WC | (Germany) B Phau | 1 | 1
(France) **J Boutter** | 6^{5} | **7^{9}** | **6**
(Argentina) J Acasuso | **7^{7}** | 6^{7} | 3

Second round
4 | (Slovakia) **D Hrbatý** | **7^{11}** | **6**
(Spain) F Clavet | 6^{9} | 3
(Switzerland) M Rosset | 3 | 5
14 | (Argentina) **G Gaudio** | **6** | **7**
12 | (Czech Republic) **J Novák** | **6** | **6**
(Spain) G Blanco | 3 | 1
(France) **J Boutter** | 6^{5} | **6** | **7**
7 | (Morocco) H Arazi | **7^{7}** | 4 | 5

Third round
4 | (Slovakia) D Hrbatý | **6** | 2 | 4
14 | (Argentina) **G Gaudio** | 1 | **6** | **6**
12 | (Czech Republic) **J Novák** | **6** | **6**
(France) J Boutter | 1 | 4

Quarterfinals
14 | (Argentina) G Gaudio | 5 | **7^{7}** | 5
12 | (Czech Republic) **J Novák** | **7** | 6^{5} | **7**

=== Bottom half ===
==== Section 3 ====
First round
Q | (Australia) R Fromberg | 4 | **6** | 4
Q | (Spain) **M López** | **6** | 3 | **6**
(Spain) **S Bruguera** | **6** | **6**
Q | (Norway) J F Andersen | 4 | 1
(Spain) **F Vicente** | **7^{7}** | **6**
WC | (Germany) M-K Goellner | 6^{3} | 4
WC | (Germany) M Kohlmann | **7^{7}** | 3 | 5
(Chile) **N Massú** | 6^{2} | **6** | **7**

Second round
8 | (Argentina) G Coria | 4 | 6^{7}
Q | (Spain) **M López** | **6** | **7^{9}**
(Spain) **S Bruguera** | **6** | **6**
11 | (Sweden) A Vinciguerra | 2 | 3
13 | (Spain) **A Martín** | **6** | **6**
(Spain) F Vicente | 1 | 3
(Chile) N Massú | 4 | **6** | 3
3 | (France) **A Clément** | **6** | 3 | **6**

Third round
Q | (Spain) **M López** | 5 | **7** | **6**
(Spain) S Bruguera | **7** | 5 | 1
13 | (Spain) **A Martín** | **7** | **6**
3 | (France) A Clément | 5 | 3

Quarterfinals
Q | (Spain) **M López** | 4 | **6** | **6**
13 | (Spain) A Martín | **6** | 4 | 3

==== Section 4 ====
First round
Q | (Netherlands) **R Wassen** | **6** | 4 | **6**
(Spain) J Balcells | 1 | **6** | 2
(Ukraine) **A Medvedev** | **7^{7}** | **6**
(France) A Di Pasquale | 6^{5} | 1
(France) **C Pioline** | **6** | **6**
(Germany) R Schüttler | 4 | 3
Q | (Romania) G Trifu | 5 | 6^{6}
(Italy) **A Gaudenzi** | **7** | **7^{8}**

Second round
6 | (Argentina) **F Squillari** | **6** | **6**
Q | (Netherlands) R Wassen | 3 | 1
(Ukraine) A Medvedev | 3 | **6** | 5
10 | (Argentina) **G Cañas** | **6** | 2 | **7**
16 | (Spain) **A Costa** | **6** | 5 | **6**
(France) C Pioline | 4 | **7** | 4
(Italy) A Gaudenzi | 4 | 6 | r
2 | (Russia) **Y Kafelnikov** | **6** | **6**

Third round
6 | (Argentina) F Squillari | 5 | 4
10 | (Argentina) **G Cañas** | **7** | **6**
16 | (Spain) A Costa | 4 | 4
2 | (Russia) **Y Kafelnikov** | **6** | **6**

Quarterfinals
10 | (Argentina) **G Cañas** | 4 | **6** | **6**
2 | (Russia) Y Kafelnikov | **6** | 3 | 3
