= 2006 Grand Prix Hassan II – Singles =

Singles
- 2006 Grand Prix Hassan II

Final
- Champion: (Italy) Daniele Bracciali
- Runner-up: (Chile) Nicolás Massú
- Score: 6–1, 6–4

Details
- Draw: 32
- Seeds: 8

Events
Singles	Doubles
← 2005 ·	Grand Prix Hassan II	· 2007 →

Mariano Puerta was the defending champion, but did not participate this year.

Daniele Bracciali defeated Nicolás Massú 6–1, 6–4, to win the 2006 Grand Prix Hassan II singles event.

== Seeds ==
1. (Chile) Nicolás Massú (final)
2. (Peru) Luis Horna (quarterfinals)
3. (Belgium) Christophe Rochus (quarterfinals)
4. (Italy) Andreas Seppi (first round)
5. (France) Arnaud Clément (second round)
6. (Austria) Jürgen Melzer (second round)
7. (Italy) Daniele Bracciali (champion)
8. (France) Gilles Simon (semifinals)

== Draw ==
=== Key ===
- Q = Qualifier
- WC = Wild card
- LL = Lucky loser
- Alt = Alternate
- ITF = ITF entry
- PR = Protected ranking
- SR = Special ranking
- SE = Special exempt
- JE = Junior exempt
- JR = Junior Accelerator Programme entrant
- CO = College Accelerator Programme entrant
- NG = Next Gen Accelerator Program entrant
- w/o = Walkover
- r = Retired
- d = Defaulted

=== Finals ===
Semifinals
1	(Chile) Nicolás Massú	6	6
(Germany) Björn Phau	2	4
8	(France) Gilles Simon	0	1^{r}
7	(Italy) Daniele Bracciali	6	3

Final
1	(Chile) Nicolás Massú	1	4
7	(Italy) Daniele Bracciali	6	6

=== Top half ===
First round
1	(Chile) N Massú	7^{7}	6
(Germany) M Berrer	6^{4}	0
(Italy) A di Mauro	6	6
WC	(Morocco) M El Aarej	2	4
(Argentina) C Berlocq	4	1
(France) N Mahut	6	6
(Argentina) J Mónaco	4	1
5	(France) A Clément	6	6
4	(Italy) A Seppi	6^{4}	1
(Germany) B Phau	7^{7}	6
Q	(Algeria) S Saoudi	6	6
Q	(Czech Republic) D Škoch	4	2
(Spain) R Ramírez Hidalgo	7	1	4
(Czech Republic) J Vaněk	5	6	6
(Spain) G García López	3	6	3
6	(Austria) J Melzer	6	1	6

Second round
1	(Chile) N Massú	6^{2}	6	6
(Italy) A di Mauro	7^{7}	3	1
(France) N Mahut	6	7^{8}
5	(France) A Clément	3	6^{6}
(Germany) B Phau	6	6
Q	(Algeria) S Saoudi	4	4
(Czech Republic) J Vaněk	7^{7}	6
6	(Austria) J Melzer	6^{5}	2

Quarter-finals
1	(Chile) N Massú	6	7^{7}
(France) N Mahut	3	6^{3}
(Germany) B Phau	7	6
(Czech Republic) J Vaněk	5	3

Semi-finals
1	(Chile) N Massú	6	6
(Germany) B Phau	2	4

=== Bottom half ===
First round
8	(France) G Simon	6	4	6
(Czech Republic) J Hernych	1	6	4
WC	(Morocco) M Tahiri	6	3	7^{7}
(Austria) O Marach	3	6	6^{2}
(Germany) F Mayer	6	7^{7}
WC	(Algeria) L Ouahab	1	6^{4}
(Germany) T Behrend	3	4
3	(Belgium) C Rochus	6	6
7	(Italy) D Bracciali	6	6
(France) O Patience	3	4
(Germany) A Waske	6	7
(Luxembourg) G Müller	4	5
Q	(France) M Gicquel	6	6
(Serbia and Montenegro) J Tipsarević	4	1
Q	(Croatia) T Perić	5	2
2	(Peru) L Horna	7	6

Second round
8	(France) G Simon	6	6
WC	(Morocco) M Tahiri	3	4
(Germany) F Mayer	2	1
3	(Belgium) C Rochus	6	6
7	(Italy) D Bracciali	6	7
(Germany) A Waske	4	5
(France) M Gicquel	1	7	3
2	(Peru) L Horna	6	5	6

Quarter-finals
8	(France) G Simon	6	3	6
3	(Belgium) C Rochus	3	6	4
7	(Italy) D Bracciali	6^{12}	6	7^{7}
2	(Peru) L Horna	7^{14}	4	6^{3}

Semi-finals
8	(France) G Simon	0	1^{r}
7	(Italy) D Bracciali	6	3
