= 2001 Campionati Internazionali di Sicilia – Doubles =

Doubles
- 2001 Campionati Internazionali di Sicilia
- 2000 Champions: (Spain) Tomás Carbonell (Argentina) Martín García

Final
- Champions: (Spain) Tomás Carbonell (Argentina) Daniel Orsanic
- Runners-up: (Argentina) Enzo Artoni (Spain) Emilio Benfele Álvarez
- Score: 6–2, 2–6, 6–2

Events
Singles	Doubles
← 2000 ·	Campionati Internazionali di Sicilia	· 2002 →

Tomás Carbonell and Martín García were the defending champions but only Carbonell competed that year with Daniel Orsanic.

Carbonell and Orsanic won in the final 6–2, 2–6, 6–2 against Enzo Artoni and Emilio Benfele Álvarez.

== Seeds ==
Champion seeds are indicated in bold text while text in italics indicates the round in which those seeds were eliminated.

1. (Spain) **Tomás Carbonell** / (Argentina) **Daniel Orsanic (champions)**
2. (Argentina) Pablo Albano / (Germany) Marc-Kevin Goellner (quarterfinals)
3. (Spain) Juan Balcells / (Spain) Albert Portas (quarterfinals)
4. (Argentina) Mariano Hood / (Argentina) Sebastián Prieto (semifinals)

== Draw ==
=== Key ===
- Q = Qualifier
- WC = Wild card
- LL = Lucky loser
- Alt = Alternate
- ITF = ITF entry
- PR = Protected ranking
- SR = Special ranking
- SE = Special exempt
- JE = Junior exempt
- JR = Junior Accelerator Programme entrant
- CO = College Accelerator Programme entrant
- NG = Next Gen Accelerator Program entrant
- w/o = Walkover
- r = Retired
- d = Defaulted

First round
1	(Spain) **T Carbonell** (Argentina) **D Orsanic**	**6**	**6**
(Spain) G Puentes (Italy) A Schneiter	3	0
(Czech Republic) **P Kovačka** (Czech Republic) **D Škoch**	**w/o**
WC	(Spain) C Moyá (Argentina) M Puerta
4	(Argentina) **M Hood** (Argentina) **S Prieto**	**7^{8}**	**7^{7}**
(Australia) A Fisher (Australia) L Pearson	6^{6}	6^{2}
WC	(Italy) F Luzzi (Sweden) A Vinciguerra	4	3
WC	(India) **M Bhupathi** (Italy) **M Navarra**	**6**	**6**
(United States) B Coupe (Israel) A Ram	3	1
(Argentina) **E Artoni** (Spain) **E Benfele Álvarez**	**6**	**6**
(Spain) Á López Morón (Spain) J Velasco Jr.	4	6^{4}
3	(Spain) **J Balcells** (Spain) **A Portas**	**6**	**7^{7}**
(Italy) M Bertolini (Italy) C Brandi	3	5
(Australia) **J Kerr** (Australia) **G Silcock**	**6**	**7**
WC	(Spain) A Costa (Spain) T Robredo	2	**6**	4
2	(Argentina) **P Albano** (Germany) **M-K Goellner**	**6**	3	**6**

Quarterfinals
1	(Spain) **T Carbonell** (Argentina) **D Orsanic**	**6**	6^{4}	**6**
(Czech Republic) P Kovačka (Czech Republic) D Škoch	4	**7^{7}**	4
4	(Argentina) **M Hood** (Argentina) **S Prieto**	**6**	**6**
WC	(India) M Bhupathi (Italy) M Navarra	2	3
(Argentina) **E Artoni** (Spain) **E Benfele Álvarez**	**7^{7}**	2	**7^{7}**
3	(Spain) J Balcells (Spain) A Portas	6^{3}	**6**	6^{4}
(Australia) **J Kerr** (Australia) **G Silcock**	6^{2}	**7^{9}**	**6**
2	(Argentina) P Albano (Germany) M-K Goellner	**7^{7}**	6^{7}	1

Semifinals
1	(Spain) **T Carbonell** (Argentina) **D Orsanic**	**7^{7}**	**6**
4	(Argentina) M Hood (Argentina) S Prieto	6^{5}	1
(Argentina) **E Artoni** (Spain) **E Benfele Álvarez**	**6**	**6**
(Australia) J Kerr (Australia) G Silcock	4	4

Final
1	(Spain) **Tomás Carbonell** (Argentina) **Daniel Orsanic**	**6**	2	**6**
(Argentina) Enzo Artoni (Spain) Emilio Benfele Álvarez	2	**6**	2
