= 2001 Mercedes Cup =

- Date: 16–22 July
- Edition: 53rd
- Category: International Series Gold.
- Draw: 48S / 24D
- Prize money: $700,000
- Surface: Clay / outdoor
- Location: Stuttgart, Germany
- Venue: Tennis Club Weissenhof

Champions

Singles
- (Brazil) Gustavo Kuerten

Doubles
- (Argentina) Guillermo Cañas / (Germany) Rainer Schüttler
← 2000 ·	Stuttgart Open	· 2002 →

The 2001 Mercedes Cup was a men's tennis tournament played on outdoor clay courts at the Tennis Club Weissenhof in Stuttgart, Germany and was part of the International Series Gold of the 2001 ATP Tour. The tournament was held from 16 July until 22 July 2001. First-seeded Gustavo Kuerten won the singles title.

== Finals ==
=== Singles ===
(Brazil) Gustavo Kuerten defeated (Argentina) Guillermo Cañas 6–3, 6–2, 6–4

- It was Kuerten's 6th title of the year and the 23rd of his career.

=== Doubles ===
(Argentina) Guillermo Cañas / (Germany) Rainer Schüttler defeated (Australia) Michael Hill / (United States) Jeff Tarango 4–6, 7–6^{(7–1)}, 6–4

- It was Cañas' 2nd title of the year and the 3rd of his career. It was Schüttler's 1st title of the year and the 2nd of his career.
