= 2004 Grand Prix Hassan II =

- Date: 17–24 May
- Edition: 20th
- Surface: Clay / outdoor
- Location: Casablanca, Morocco

Champions

Singles
- (Spain) Santiago Ventura

Doubles
- (Italy) Enzo Artoni / (Spain) Fernando Vicente
- Grand Prix Hassan II

The 2004 Grand Prix Hassan II was an Association of Tennis Professionals tennis tournament held in Casablanca, Morocco. It was the 20th edition of the tournament and was held from May 17 to May 24.

== Finals ==
=== Singles ===
(Spain) Santiago Ventura defeated (Slovakia) Dominik Hrbatý 6–3, 1–6, 6–4

- It was Ventura's only title of the year and the 1st of his career.

=== Doubles ===
(Italy) Enzo Artoni / (Spain) Fernando Vicente defeated (Switzerland) Yves Allegro / (Germany) Michael Kohlmann 3–6, 6–0, 6–4

- It was Artoni's only title of the year and the 2nd of his career. It was Vicente's only title of the year and the 4th of his career.
