= 2011 Savannah Challenger =

- Date: 2–8 May
- Edition: 3rd
- Location: Savannah, United States

Champions

Singles
- (United States) Wayne Odesnik

Doubles
- (South Africa) Rik de Voest / (South Africa) Izak van der Merwe
- Savannah Challenger

The 2011 Savannah Challenger was a professional tennis tournament played on clay courts. It was the third edition of the tournament which was part of the 2011 ATP Challenger Tour. It took place in Savannah, Georgia, United States between May 2 and May 8, 2011.

== ATP entrants ==
=== Seeds ===
Country	Player	Rank^{1}	Seed
USA	Robert Kendrick	84	1
USA	Michael Russell	89	2
USA	Donald Young	95	3
USA	Ryan Harrison	128	4
RSA	Izak van der Merwe	134	5
AUS	Marinko Matosevic	145	6
USA	Bobby Reynolds	146	7
USA	James Blake	149	8

- Rankings are as of April 25, 2011.

=== Other entrants ===
The following players received wildcards into the singles main draw:

- (United States) Andrea Collarini
- (United States) Denis Kudla
- (United States) Mark Oljaca
- (South Africa) Wesley Whitehouse

The following players received entry from the qualifying draw:

- (Bosnia and Herzegovina) Amer Delić
- (Slovenia) Luka Gregorc
- (United States) Wayne Odesnik
- (United Kingdom) Morgan Phillips

== Champions ==
=== Singles ===
(United States) Wayne Odesnik def. (United States) Donald Young, 6–4, 6–4

=== Doubles ===
(South Africa) Rik de Voest / (South Africa) Izak van der Merwe def. (United States) Sekou Bangoura / (United States) Jesse Witten, 6–3, 6–3
