= 2005 Grand Prix Hassan II =

- Date: 4–11 April
- Edition: 21st
- Draw: 32S / 16D
- Prize money: $355,000
- Surface: Clay / outdoor
- Location: Casablanca, Morocco

Champions

Singles
- (Argentina) Mariano Puerta

Doubles
- (Czech Republic) František Čermák / (Czech Republic) Leoš Friedl
- Grand Prix Hassan II

The 2005 Grand Prix Hassan II was an Association of Tennis Professionals men's tennis tournament played on outdoor clay courts in Casablanca, Morocco. It was the 21st edition of the tournament and was held from 4 April until 11 April 2005. Sixth-seeded Mariano Puerta won the singles title.

== Finals ==
=== Singles ===
(Argentina) Mariano Puerta defeated (Argentina) Juan Mónaco 6–4, 6–1

- It was Puerta's only title of the year and the 6th of his career.

=== Doubles ===
(Czech Republic) František Čermák / (Czech Republic) Leoš Friedl defeated (Argentina) Martín García / (Peru) Luis Horna 6–4, 6–3

- It was Čermák's 3rd title of the year and the 8th of his career. It was Friedl's 3rd title of the year and the 8th of his career.
