= Jalal Chafai =

Moroccan tennis player

- Full name: Jalal Chafai-Alaoui
- Country (sports): Morocco
- Born: 22 January 1980 (age 46)
- Plays: Right-handed
- Prize money: $16,060

Singles
- Highest ranking: No. 546 (14 Jul 2003)

Doubles
- Career record: 0–1
- Highest ranking: No. 674 (23 Feb 2004)

Jalal Chafai-Alaoui (born 22 January 1980) is a Moroccan former professional tennis player.

Chafai, an Arab world junior champion from Salé, spent his early career in the United States playing collegiate tennis for the Drury Panthers, who were coached by Moroccan Amine Boustani. After graduating in 2001 he competed on the professional tour and reached a best singles world ranking of 546, with an ITF Futures title win in Algeria in 2003. His career included an ATP Tour doubles main draw appearance at the 2002 Grand Prix Hassan II in Casablanca. He has also played professional tennis for the Springfield Lasers in the World TeamTennis competition. Returning to Drury to complete a master's degree, Chafai served for a period as a tennis assistant coach for the college.

== ITF Futures finals ==
=== Singles: 2 (1–1) ===
| Result | W–L | Date | Tournament | Surface | Opponent | Score |
|---|---|---|---|---|---|---|
| Loss | 0–1 | Aug 1999 | Morocco F1, Tangiers | Clay | (Spain) Rubén Ramírez Hidalgo | 6–2, 3–6, 1–6 |
| Win | 1–1 | May 2003 | Algeria F2, Algiers | Clay | (Slovakia) Boris Borgula | 7–6^{(6)}, 6–7^{(3)}, 6–4 |

=== Doubles: 3 (1–2) ===
| Result | W–L | Date | Tournament | Surface | Partner | Opponents | Score |
|---|---|---|---|---|---|---|---|
| Win | 1–0 | Jun 2001 | Morocco F2, Marrakesh | Clay | (Kuwait) Mohammad Ghareeb | (Australia) Kane Dewhurst (Australia) David McNamara | 7–5, 4–6, 7–6^{(8)} |
| Loss | 1–1 | Apr 2003 | Algeria F1, Sidi Fredj | Clay | (Morocco) Rabie Chaki | (Spain) David Cors-Pares (Spain) Gabriel Trujillo Soler | 5–7, 2–6 |
| Loss | 1–2 | Aug 2003 | Egypt F1, Cairo | Clay | (Morocco) Talal Ouahabi | (Egypt) Karim Maamoun (Egypt) Mohamed Mamoun | 4–6, 3–6 |
