= 2002 Grand Prix Hassan II =

- Date: 8–4 April
- Edition: 18th
- Category: International Series
- Surface: Clay / outdoor
- Location: Casablanca, Morocco
- Venue: Complexe Al Amal

Champions

Singles
- (Morocco) Younes El Aynaoui

Doubles
- (Australia) Stephen Huss / (South Africa) Myles Wakefield
- Grand Prix Hassan II

The 2002 Grand Prix Hassan II was a men's tennis tournament played on outdoor clay courts at the Complexe Al Amal in Casablanca in Morocco and was part of the International Series of the 2002 ATP Tour. It was the 18th edition of the tournament and was held from 8 April through 14 April 2002. Second-seeded Younes El Aynaoui won the singles title.

== Finals ==
=== Singles ===
(Morocco) Younes El Aynaoui defeated (Argentina) Guillermo Cañas 3–6, 6–3, 6–2

- It was El Aynaoui's 2nd title of the year and the 4th of his career.

=== Doubles ===
(Australia) Stephen Huss / (South Africa) Myles Wakefield defeated (Argentina) Martín García / (Argentina) Luis Lobo 6–4, 6–2

- It was Huss's only title of the year and the 1st of his career. It was Wakefield's only title of the year and the 1st of his career.
