= 2006 Grand Prix Hassan II – Doubles =

Doubles
- 2006 Grand Prix Hassan II

Final
- Champions: (Austria) Julian Knowle (Austria) Jürgen Melzer
- Runners-up: (Germany) Michael Kohlmann (Germany) Alexander Waske
- Score: 6–3, 6–4

Details
- Draw: 16
- Seeds: 4

Events
Singles	Doubles
← 2005 ·	Grand Prix Hassan II	· 2007 →

František Čermák and Leoš Friedl were the defending champions, but did not participate this year.

Julian Knowle and Jürgen Melzer won the title, defeating Michael Kohlmann and Alexander Waske 6–3, 6–4 in the final.

== Seeds ==
1. (Austria) Julian Knowle / (Austria) Jürgen Melzer (champions)
2. (Argentina) Martín García / (Argentina) Sebastián Prieto (quarterfinals)
3. (Australia) Ashley Fisher / (Australia) Jordan Kerr (first round)
4. (Australia) Stephen Huss / (United States) Tripp Phillips (quarterfinals)

== Draw ==
=== Key ===
- Q = Qualifier
- WC = Wild card
- LL = Lucky loser
- Alt = Alternate
- ITF = ITF entry
- PR = Protected ranking
- SR = Special ranking
- SE = Special exempt
- JE = Junior exempt
- JR = Junior Accelerator Programme entrant
- CO = College Accelerator Programme entrant
- NG = Next Gen Accelerator Program entrant
- w/o = Walkover
- r = Retired
- d = Defaulted

First round
1	(Austria) J Knowle (Austria) J Melzer	6^{5}	6	[10]
(Germany) C Kas (Germany) B Phau	7^{7}	1	[7]
WC	(Morocco) T Ouahabi (Morocco) M Ziadi	4	1
WC	(Morocco) M El Aarej (Morocco) M Tahiri	6	6
3	(Australia) A Fisher (Australia) J Kerr	5	6^{7}
(Belgium) C Rochus (Luxembourg) G Müller	7	7^{9}
(Austria) O Marach (Serbia and Montenegro) J Tipsarević	6	7^{7}
(Italy) D Bracciali (Italy) A Seppi	2	6^{1}
(Peru) L Horna (Argentina) J Mónaco	6	5	[3]
(Germany) T Behrend (Germany) P Petzschner	3	7	[10]
(France) A Clément (France) N Mahut	3	6^{6}
4	(Australia) S Huss (United States) T Phillips	6	7^{8}
(Germany) M Kohlmann (Germany) A Waske	6	6
(Argentina) C Berlocq (Italy) A di Mauro	1	4
(Czech Republic) D Škoch (Czech Republic) J Vaněk	6	1	[5]
2	(Argentina) M García (Argentina) S Prieto	2	6	[10]

Quarterfinals
1	(Austria) J Knowle (Austria) J Melzer	6	6
WC	(Morocco) M El Aarej (Morocco) M Tahiri	0	1
(Belgium) C Rochus (Luxembourg) G Müller	6	6
(Austria) O Marach (Serbia and Montenegro) J Tipsarević	1	0
(Germany) T Behrend (Germany) P Petzschner	6	6^{4}	[7]
4	(Australia) S Huss (United States) T Phillips	3	7^{7}	[10]
(Germany) M Kohlmann (Germany) A Waske	7	6
2	(Argentina) M García (Argentina) S Prieto	5	2

Semifinals
1	(Austria) J Knowle (Austria) J Melzer	7	6
(Belgium) C Rochus (Luxembourg) G Müller	5	2
4	(Australia) S Huss (United States) T Phillips	3	3
(Germany) M Kohlmann (Germany) A Waske	6	6

Finals
1	(Austria) J Knowle (Austria) J Melzer	6	6
(Germany) M Kohlmann (Germany) A Waske	3	4
