= 2001 Campionati Internazionali di Sicilia =

- Date: 24–30 September
- Edition: 23rd
- Category: International Series
- Draw: 32S / 16D
- Prize money: $375,000
- Surface: Clay / outdoor
- Location: Palermo, Italy

Champions

Singles
- (Spain) Félix Mantilla

Doubles
- (Spain) Tomás Carbonell / (Argentina) Daniel Orsanic
- Campionati Internazionali di Sicilia

The 2001 Campionati Internazionali di Sicilia was a men's tennis tournament played on outdoor clay courts in Palermo, Italy that was part of the International Series of the 2001 ATP Tour. It was the 23rd edition of the tournament and ran from 24 September until 30 September 2001. Unseeded Félix Mantilla won the singles title.

== Finals ==
=== Singles ===
(Spain) Félix Mantilla defeated (Argentina) David Nalbandian 7–6^{(7–2)}, 6–4

- It was Mantilla's only title of the year and the 9th of his career.

=== Doubles ===
(Spain) Tomás Carbonell / (Argentina) Daniel Orsanic defeated (Italy) Enzo Artoni / (Spain) Emilio Benfele Álvarez 6–2, 2–6, 6–2

- It was Carbonell's 3rd title of the year and the 24th of his career. It was Orsanic's only title of the year and the 8th of his career.
