= 2003 Grand Prix Hassan II – Doubles =

Doubles
- 2003 Grand Prix Hassan II

Final
- Champions: (Czech Republic) František Čermák (Czech Republic) Leoš Friedl
- Runners-up: (United States) Devin Bowen (Australia) Ashley Fisher
- Score: 6–3, 7–5

Events
Singles	Doubles
← 2002 ·	Grand Prix Hassan II	· 2004 →

Stephen Huss and Myles Wakefield were the defending champions but did not compete that year.

František Čermák and Leoš Friedl won in the final 6–3, 7–5 against Devin Bowen and Ashley Fisher.

== Seeds ==
1. (South Africa) Chris Haggard / (South Africa) Robbie Koenig (quarterfinals)
2. (Czech Republic) František Čermák / (Czech Republic) Leoš Friedl (champions)
3. (United States) Jared Palmer / (United States) Jeff Tarango (quarterfinals)
4. (Czech Republic) Petr Luxa / (Czech Republic) David Škoch (first round)

== Draw ==
=== Key ===
- Q = Qualifier
- WC = Wild card
- LL = Lucky loser
- Alt = Alternate
- SE = Special exempt
- PR = Protected ranking
- ITF = ITF entry
- JE = Junior exempt
- w/o = Walkover
- r = Retired
- d = Defaulted
- SR = Special ranking

First round
1	(South Africa) C Haggard (South Africa) R Koenig	6	1	6
(France) A Clément (France) O Mutis	1	6	3
(Austria) J Knowle (Germany) M Kohlmann	6	6
(Italy) E Artoni (Peru) L Horna	4	1
4	(Czech Republic) P Luxa (Czech Republic) D Škoch	3	6	1
(United States) D Bowen (Australia) A Fisher	6	3	6
WC	(Morocco) K Alami (Morocco) H Arazi	6	3	7^{7}
(Italy) D Sanguinetti (Armenia) S Sargsian	2	6	6^{3}
(Sweden) S Aspelin (Slovakia) D Hrbatý	0	4
(Argentina) S Prieto (Brazil) A Sá	6	6
(Italy) M Bertolini (Argentina) A Schneiter	4	1
3	(United States) J Palmer (United States) J Tarango	6	6
WC	(Morocco) M Dakki (Morocco) M El Aarej	2	4
ALT	(Brazil) F Meligeni (Brazil) F Saretta	6	6
(Spain) A Portas (Spain) F Vicente	6^{0}	2
2	(Czech Republic) F Čermák (Czech Republic) L Friedl	7^{7}	6

Quarterfinals
1	(South Africa) C Haggard (South Africa) R Koenig	4	4
(Austria) J Knowle (Germany) M Kohlmann	6	6
(United States) D Bowen (Australia) A Fisher	4	7^{7}	6
WC	(Morocco) K Alami (Morocco) H Arazi	6	6^{2}	2
(Argentina) S Prieto (Brazil) A Sá	6	7^{7}
3	(United States) J Palmer (United States) J Tarango	3	6^{3}
ALT	(Brazil) F Meligeni (Brazil) F Saretta	4	6	2
2	(Czech Republic) F Čermák (Czech Republic) L Friedl	6	2	6

Semifinals
(Austria) J Knowle (Germany) M Kohlmann	4	4
(United States) D Bowen (Australia) A Fisher	6	6
(Argentina) S Prieto (Brazil) A Sá	4	4
2	(Czech Republic) F Čermák (Czech Republic) L Friedl	6	6

Final
(United States) D Bowen (Australia) A Fisher	3	5
2	(Czech Republic) F Čermák (Czech Republic) L Friedl	6	7
