= 2003 Grand Prix Hassan II =

- Date: 7–13 April
- Edition: 19th
- Category: International Series
- Surface: Caly / outdoor
- Location: Casablanca, Morocco
- Venue: Complexe Al Amal

Champions

Singles
- (France) Julien Boutter

Doubles
- (Czech Republic) František Čermák / (Czech Republic) Leoš Friedl
- Grand Prix Hassan II

The 2003 Grand Prix Hassan II was a tennis tournament played on outdoor clay courts at the Complexe Al Amal in Casablanca in Morocco and was part of the International Series of the 2003 ATP Tour. It was the 19th edition of the tournament and was held from 7 April through 13 April 2003. Unseeded Julien Boutter won the singles title.

== Finals ==
=== Singles ===
(France) Julien Boutter defeated (Morocco) Younes El Aynaoui 6–2, 2–6, 6–1

- It was Boutter's only title of the year and the 5th of his career.

=== Doubles ===
(Czech Republic) František Čermák / (Czech Republic) Leoš Friedl defeated (United States) Devin Bowen / (Australia) Ashley Fisher 6–3, 7–5

- It was Čermák's only title of the year and the 3rd of his career. It was Friedl's only title of the year and the 3rd of his career.
