= 2001 Stuttgart Open – Doubles =

Doubles
- 2001 Stuttgart Open
- 2000 Champion: (Czech Republic) Jiří Novák (Czech Republic) David Rikl

Final
- Champion: (Argentina) Guillermo Cañas (Germany) Rainer Schüttler
- Runner-up: (Australia) Michael Hill (United States) Jeff Tarango
- Score: 4–6, 7–6^{(7–1)}, 6–4

Details
- Draw: 24
- Seeds: 8

Events
Singles	Doubles
- Stuttgart Open

Jiří Novák and David Rikl were the defending champions but lost in the second round to Tomás Carbonell and Nicolás Lapentti.

Guillermo Cañas and Rainer Schüttler won in the final 4–6, 7–6^{(7–1)}, 6–4 against Michael Hill and Jeff Tarango.

== Seeds ==
Champion seeds are indicated in bold text while text in italics indicates the round in which those seeds were eliminated. All eight seeded teams received byes to the second round.

1. (Czech Republic) Jiří Novák / (Czech Republic) David Rikl (second round)
2. (Czech Republic) Petr Pála / (Czech Republic) Pavel Vízner (quarterfinals)
3. (Australia) Joshua Eagle / (Australia) Andrew Florent (quarterfinals)
4. (Australia) Michael Hill / (United States) Jeff Tarango (final)
5. (Argentina) Pablo Albano / (Argentina) Lucas Arnold (semifinals)
6. (South Africa) Chris Haggard / (Belgium) Tom Vanhoudt (semifinals)
7. (Spain) Juan Balcells / (Russia) Yevgeny Kafelnikov (quarterfinals)
8. (South Africa) Marius Barnard / (Czech Republic) Cyril Suk (second round)

== Draw ==
Key

- Q = Qualifier
- WC = Wild card
- LL = Lucky loser
- Alt = Alternate
- ITF = ITF entry
- PR = Protected ranking
- SR = Special ranking
- SE = Special exempt
- JE = Junior exempt
- JR = Junior Accelerator Programme entrant
- CO = College Accelerator Programme entrant
- NG = Next Gen Accelerator Program entrant
- w/o = Walkover
- r = Retired
- d = Defaulted

=== Final ===
Final

4
- (Australia) Michael Hill
- (United States) Jeff Tarango
**6**
6^{1}
4

WC
- (Argentina) **Guillermo Cañas**
- (Germany) **Rainer Schüttler**
4
**7^{7}**
**6**

=== Top half ===
First round

Second round

Quarterfinals

Semifinals

1
- (Czech Republic) J Novák
- (Czech Republic) D Rikl
**7**
3
3

- (Spain) **T Carbonell**
- (Ecuador) **N Lapentti**
**6**
**6**

- (Spain) **T Carbonell**
- (Ecuador) **N Lapentti**
5
**6**
**6**

- (Brazil) J Oncins
- (Argentina) D Orsanic
0
2

- (Spain) T Carbonell
- (Ecuador) N Lapentti
1
**6**
4

- (Netherlands) S Groen
- (Germany) M Kohlmann
3
4

5
- (Argentina) **P Albano**
- (Argentina) **L Arnold**
**6**
3
**6**

- (Sweden) **S Aspelin**
- (Australia) **A Kratzmann**
**6**
**6**

- (Sweden) S Aspelin
- (Australia) A Kratzmann
3
**6**
3

5
- (Argentina) **P Albano**
- (Argentina) **L Arnold**
**6**
3
**6**

5
- (Argentina) P Albano
- (Argentina) L Arnold
6^{0}
4

4
- (Australia) **M Hill**
- (United States) **J Tarango**
**7^{7}**
**6**

4
- (Australia) **M Hill**
- (United States) **J Tarango**
**6**
**6**

- (Spain) **J I Carrasco**
- (Uzbekistan) **V Kutsenko**
**6**
**6**

- (Spain) J I Carrasco
- (Uzbekistan) V Kutsenko
4
3

WC
- (Germany) P Petzschner
- (Germany) S Stadler
4
4

4
- (Australia) **M Hill**
- (United States) **J Tarango**
4
**6**
**7^{7}**

- (Germany) M-K Goellner
- (Russia) A Olhovskiy
3
2

7
- (Spain) J Balcells
- (Russia) Y Kafelnikov
**6**
4
6^{2}

- (France) **A Clément**
- (Slovakia) **D Hrbatý**
**6**
**6**

- (France) A Clément
- (Slovakia) D Hrbatý

7
- (Spain) **J Balcells**
- (Russia) **Y Kafelnikov**
w/o

=== Bottom half ===
First round

Second round

Quarterfinals

Semifinals

6
- (South Africa) **C Haggard**
- (Belgium) **T Vanhoudt**
0
**7^{7}**
**6**

WC
- (Germany) L Burgsmüller
- (Sweden) A Vinciguerra
3
**6**
3

WC
- (Spain) A Costa
- (Spain) A Martín
**6**
6^{4}
3

WC
- (Spain) **A Costa**
- (Spain) **A Martín**
**6**
3
**6**

6
- (South Africa) **C Haggard**
- (Belgium) **T Vanhoudt**
4
**7^{7}**
**6**

WC
- (Morocco) H Arazi
- (France) J Boutter
3
4

3
- (Australia) J Eagle
- (Australia) A Florent
**6**
6^{4}
1

- (North Macedonia) **A Kitinov**
- (Sweden) **J Landsberg**
**6**
**6**

- (North Macedonia) A Kitinov
- (Sweden) J Landsberg
6^{3}
5

3
- (Australia) **J Eagle**
- (Australia) **A Florent**
**7^{7}**
**7**

6
- (South Africa) C Haggard
- (Belgium) T Vanhoudt
4
6^{1}

WC
- (Argentina) **G Cañas**
- (Germany) **R Schüttler**
**6**
**7^{7}**

8
- (South Africa) M Barnard
- (Czech Republic) C Suk
4
5

WC
- (Argentina) **G Cañas**
- (Germany) **R Schüttler**
**6**
**6**

WC
- (Argentina) **G Cañas**
- (Germany) **R Schüttler**
**6**
**7**

WC
- (Argentina) G Coria
- (Argentina) G Gaudio
1
4

WC
- (Argentina) **G Cañas**
- (Germany) **R Schüttler**
**7**
2
**6**

- (Germany) M Hilpert
- (South Africa) D Roberts
4
2

2
- (Czech Republic) P Pála
- (Czech Republic) P Vízner
5
**6**
2

- (Austria) **J Knowle**
- (Switzerland) **L Manta**
**6**
**6**

- (Austria) J Knowle
- (Switzerland) L Manta
3
4

2
- (Czech Republic) **P Pála**
- (Czech Republic) **P Vízner**
**6**
**6**
