= 2005 Grand Prix Hassan II – Singles =

Singles
- 2005 Grand Prix Hassan II

Final
- Champion: (Argentina) Mariano Puerta
- Runner-up: (Argentina) Juan Mónaco
- Score: 6–4, 6–1

Events
Singles	Doubles
← 2004 ·	Grand Prix Hassan II	· 2006 →

Santiago Ventura was the defending champion, but lost in the second round.

Mariano Puerta won the title, defeating Juan Mónaco 6–4, 6–1 in the final.

== Seeds ==
1. (Germany) Rainer Schüttler (first round)
2. (Italy) Filippo Volandri (semifinals)
3. (Peru) Luis Horna (first round)
4. (France) Fabrice Santoro (first round)
5. (Germany) Florian Mayer (second round)
6. (Argentina) Mariano Puerta (champion)
7. (Luxembourg) Gilles Müller (quarterfinals)
8. (Belgium) Christophe Rochus (quarterfinals)

== Draw ==
=== Key ===
- Q = Qualifier
- WC = Wild card
- LL = Lucky loser
- Alt = Alternate
- SE = Special exempt
- PR = Protected ranking
- ITF = ITF entry
- JE = Junior exempt
- w/o = Walkover
- r = Retired
- d = Defaulted
- SR = Special ranking

=== Finals ===
Semifinals
(Czech Republic) Tomáš Zíb	2	4
(Argentina) Juan Mónaco	6	6
6	(Argentina) Mariano Puerta	6	7^{8}
2	(Italy) Filippo Volandri	3	6^{6}

Final
(Argentina) Juan Mónaco	4	1
6	(Argentina) Mariano Puerta	6	6

=== Top half ===
First round
1	(Germany) R Schüttler	2	2
(Czech Republic) T Zíb	6	6
(Spain) S Ventura	7	6
WC	(Morocco) H Arazi	5	3
Q	(France) T Ascione	5	4
(Spain) D Sánchez	7	6
WC	(Morocco) M Tahiri	3	2
8	(Belgium) C Rochus	6	6
4	(France) F Santoro	4	6	3
(Czech Republic) J Vaněk	6	3	6
Q	(France) G Simon	6	3	6
(Argentina) J Acasuso	3	6	3
(Italy) D Sanguinetti	6^{5}	4
(Argentina) J Mónaco	7^{7}	6
(Czech Republic) B Ulihrach	2	1
5	(Germany) F Mayer	6	6

Second round
(Czech Republic) T Zíb	6	6
(Spain) S Ventura	4	1
(Spain) D Sánchez	5	6	3
8	(Belgium) C Rochus	7	4	6
(Czech Republic) J Vaněk	4	6	3
Q	(France) G Simon	6	3	6
(Argentina) J Mónaco	7^{7}	6
5	(Germany) F Mayer	6^{4}	0

Quarter-finals
(Czech Republic) T Zíb	6	7^{9}
8	(Belgium) C Rochus	1	6^{7}
Q	(France) G Simon	6	2	5
(Argentina) J Mónaco	4	6	7

Semi-finals
(Czech Republic) T Zíb	2	4
(Argentina) J Mónaco	6	6

=== Bottom half ===
First round
6	(Argentina) M Puerta	6	6
(Germany) T Behrend	4	1
(Spain) N Almagro	6	6
(Germany) L Burgsmüller	2	2
Q	(France) M Gicquel	1	7	6
Q	(Slovakia) M Mertiňák	6	5	4
(France) A Clément	7	6
3	(Peru) L Horna	5	2
7	(Luxembourg) G Müller	7	6
(Monaco) J-R Lisnard	5	2
(Serbia and Montenegro) J Tipsarevic	7	6
(France) O Mutis	5	3
(Finland) J Nieminen	6	7^{7}
(Romania) V Hănescu	3	6^{2}
WC	(Morocco) Y El Aynaoui	3	6^{5}
2	(Italy) F Volandri	6	7^{7}

Second round
6	(Argentina) M Puerta	6	7^{7}
(Spain) N Almagro	3	6^{2}
Q	(France) M Gicquel	4	4
(France) A Clément	6	6
7	(Luxembourg) G Müller	6	6
(Serbia and Montenegro) J Tipsarevic	3	4
(Finland) J Nieminen	6	1	4
2	(Italy) F Volandri	3	6	6

Quarter-finals
6	(Argentina) M Puerta	4	6	6
(France) A Clément	6	1	2
7	(Luxembourg) G Müller	6^{0}	1
2	(Italy) F Volandri	7^{7}	6

Semi-finals
6	(Argentina) M Puerta	6	7^{8}
2	(Italy) F Volandri	3	6^{6}
