= 2004 Grand Prix Hassan II – Doubles =

Doubles
- 2004 Grand Prix Hassan II

Final
- Champions: (Italy) Enzo Artoni (Spain) Fernando Vicente
- Runners-up: (Switzerland) Yves Allegro (Germany) Michael Kohlmann
- Score: 3–6, 6–0, 6–4

Events
Singles	Doubles
← 2003 ·	Grand Prix Hassan II	· 2005 →

František Čermák and Leoš Friedl were the defending champions, but did not participate this year.

Enzo Artoni and Fernando Vicente won in the final 3–6, 6–0, 6–4, against Yves Allegro and Michael Kohlmann.

== Seeds ==
1. (Switzerland) Yves Allegro / (Germany) Michael Kohlmann (final)
2. (Australia) Jordan Kerr / (Belgium) Tom Vanhoudt (semifinals)
3. (Argentina) Martín García / (Spain) Álex López Morón (quarterfinals)
4. (France) Julien Benneteau / (France) Nicolas Mahut (quarterfinals)

== Draw ==
=== Key ===
- Q = Qualifier
- WC = Wild card
- LL = Lucky loser
- Alt = Alternate
- SE = Special exempt
- PR = Protected ranking
- ITF = ITF entry
- JE = Junior exempt
- w/o = Walkover
- r = Retired
- d = Defaulted
- SR = Special ranking

=== Draw ===
First round
1	(Switzerland) Y Allegro (Germany) M Kohlmann	6	2	6
(Belgium) G Elseneer (Netherlands) D van Scheppingen	1	6	4
WC	(Morocco) R Chaki (Morocco) K Filali	0	0
(Spain) Ó Hernández (Spain) A Portas	6	6
4	(France) J Benneteau (France) N Mahut	6	6^{6}	6
(Spain) JI Carrasco (Spain) R Ramírez Hidalgo	4	7^{8}	3
(Australia) T Perry (Japan) T Shimada	6^{5}	6	1
WC	(Morocco) M El Aarej (Morocco) M Tahiri	7^{7}	4	6
(Italy) E Artoni (Spain) F Vicente	6	6^{6}	6
(United States) G Oliver (United States) J Thomas	1	7^{8}	2
(France) T Ascione (France) J Boutter	0	0
3	(Argentina) M García (Spain) Á López Morón	6	6
(United States) D Bowen (France) A Dupuis	3	2
(Australia) A Fisher (Australia) S Huss	6	6
(Argentina) F Browne (Netherlands) R Wassen	6^{4}	1
2	(Australia) J Kerr (Belgium) T Vanhoudt	7^{7}	6

Quarterfinals
1	(Switzerland) Y Allegro (Germany) M Kohlmann	w/o
(Spain) Ó Hernández (Spain) A Portas
4	(France) J Benneteau (France) N Mahut	6	6^{3}	1
WC	(Morocco) M El Aarej (Morocco) M Tahiri	2	7^{7}	6
(Italy) E Artoni (Spain) F Vicente	6	6^{3}	7
3	(Argentina) M García (Spain) Á López Morón	3	7^{7}	5
(Australia) A Fisher (Australia) S Huss	6	3	4
2	(Australia) J Kerr (Belgium) T Vanhoudt	4	6	6

Semifinals
1	(Switzerland) Y Allegro (Germany) M Kohlmann	5	7	6
WC	(Morocco) M El Aarej (Morocco) M Tahiri	7	5	3
(Italy) E Artoni (Spain) F Vicente	3	6	7^{7}
2	(Australia) J Kerr (Belgium) T Vanhoudt	6	2	6^{4}

Final
1	(Switzerland) Y Allegro (Germany) M Kohlmann	6	0	4
(Italy) E Artoni (Spain) F Vicente	3	6	6
