= 2011 Savannah Challenger – Singles =

Singles
- 2011 Savannah Challenger

Final
- Champion: (United States) Wayne Odesnik
- Runner-up: (United States) Donald Young
- Score: 6–4, 6–4

Events
Singles	Doubles
- Savannah Challenger

Kei Nishikori was the defending champion, but chose to compete in Madrid instead.
Wayne Odesnik defeated Donald Young 6–4, 6–4 in the final.

== Seeds ==
1. (United States) Robert Kendrick (second round)
2. (United States) Michael Russell (semifinals)
3. (United States) Donald Young (final)
4. (United States) Ryan Harrison (semifinals)
5. (South Africa) Izak van der Merwe (first round)
6. (Australia) Marinko Matosevic (first round)
7. (United States) Bobby Reynolds (quarterfinals)
8. (United States) James Blake (quarterfinals)

== Draw ==
Key

- Q = Qualifier
- WC = Wild card
- LL = Lucky loser
- Alt = Alternate
- ITF = ITF entry
- PR = Protected ranking
- SR = Special ranking
- SE = Special exempt
- JE = Junior exempt
- JR = Junior Accelerator Programme entrant
- CO = College Accelerator Programme entrant
- NG = Next Gen Accelerator Program entrant
- w/o = Walkover
- r = Retired
- d = Defaulted

=== Finals ===
Semifinals
Q	(United States) Wayne Odesnik	6	5	6
4	(United States) Ryan Harrison	3	7	2
3	(United States) Donald Young	6	6
2	(United States) Michael Russell	1	4

Final
Q	(United States) Wayne Odesnik	6	6
3	(United States) Donald Young	4	4

=== Top half ===
First round
1	(United States) R Kendrick	6^{4}	7	7
(Dominican Republic) V Estrella	7	5	5
WC	(United States) Marc Oljaca	2	0
Q	(Bosnia and Herzegovina) A Delić	6	6
Alt	(Canada) P Bester	1^{r}
Alt	(Australia) C Guccione	6
Q	(United States) W Odesnik	6	7
6	(Australia) M Matosevic	0	6^{1}
4	(United States) R Harrison	7	1	6
(Argentina) JP Brzezicki	6^{4}	6	4
WC	(United States) A Collarini	2	7	4
(South Africa) R de Voest	6	5	6
(United Kingdom) J Ward	6	6
(Republic of Ireland) C Niland	2	1
WC	(South Africa) W Whitehouse	1	3
7	(United States) B Reynolds	6	6

Second round
1	(United States) R Kendrick	3	5
Q	(Bosnia and Herzegovina) A Delić	6	7
Alt	(Australia) C Guccione	2	1
Q	(United States) W Odesnik	6	6
4	(United States) R Harrison	4	6	6
(South Africa) R de Voest	6	4	3
(United Kingdom) J Ward	2	4
7	(United States) B Reynolds	6	6

Quarterfinals
Q	(Bosnia and Herzegovina) A Delić	3	5	r
Q	(United States) W Odesnik	6	6
4	(United States) R Harrison	7	6
7	(United States) B Reynolds	5	3

Semifinals
Q	(United States) W Odesnik	6	5	6
4	(United States) R Harrison	3	7	2

=== Bottom half ===
First round
5	(South Africa) I van der Merwe	6^{4}	4
WC	(United States) D Kudla	7	6
LL	(United States) M Yani	7	6
Q	(Slovenia) L Gregorc	6^{1}	2
(United States) L Cook	2^{r}
(United States) J Witten	6
(Canada) F Dancevic	1	2
3	(United States) D Young	6	6
8	(United States) J Blake	6	6
Q	(United Kingdom) Morgan Phillips	3	4
(Brazil) R Hocevar	6	5	6
(Slovenia) G Žemlja	3	7	4
(United States) T Smyczek	7	2	4
(Brazil) F Romboli	5	6	6
(United States) A Kuznetsov	0	2
2	(United States) M Russell	6	6

Second round
WC	(United States) D Kudla	2	3
LL	(United States) M Yani	6	6
(United States) J Witten	1	4
3	(United States) D Young	6	6
8	(United States) J Blake	7	6
(Brazil) R Hocevar	5	4
(Brazil) F Romboli	3	0
2	(United States) M Russell	6	6

Quarterfinals
LL	(United States) M Yani	1^{r}
3	(United States) D Young	6
8	(United States) J Blake	2	4
2	(United States) M Russell	6	6

Semifinals
3	(United States) D Young	6	6
2	(United States) M Russell	1	4
