= 2006 Grand Prix Hassan II =

- Date: 24 April – 1 May
- Edition: 22nd
- Category: International Series
- Draw: 32S / 16D
- Prize money: $323,250
- Surface: Clay / outdoor
- Location: Casablanca, Morocco

Champions

Singles
- (Italy) Daniele Bracciali

Doubles
- (Austria) Julian Knowle / (Austria) Jürgen Melzer
- Grand Prix Hassan II

The 2006 Grand Prix Hassan II was a men's tennis tournament played on outdoor clay courts in Casablanca, Morocco that was part of the International Series of the 2006 ATP Tour. It was the 22nd edition of the tournament and was held from 24 April until 1 May 2006. Seventh-seeded Daniele Bracciali won the singles title.

== Finals ==
=== Singles ===
(Italy) Daniele Bracciali defeated (Chile) Nicolás Massú 6–1, 6–4

- It was Bracciali's only singles title of his career.

=== Doubles ===
(Austria) Julian Knowle / (Austria) Jürgen Melzer defeated (Germany) Michael Kohlmann / (Germany) Alexander Waske 6–3, 6–4

- It was Knowle's only title of the year and the 7th of his career. It was Melzer's 1st title of the year and the 2nd of his career.
