= 1998 Campionati Internazionali di Sicilia =

- Date: 5–11 October
- Edition: 19th
- Category: World Series
- Draw: 32S / 16D
- Prize money: $315,000
- Surface: Clay / outdoor
- Location: Palermo, Italy

Champions

Singles
- (Argentina) Mariano Puerta

Doubles
- (United States) Donald Johnson (United States) Francisco Montana
- Campionati Internazionali di Sicilia

The 1998 Campionati Internazionali di Sicilia was a men's tennis tournament played on outdoor clay courts in Palermo, Italy that was part of the World Series of the 1998 ATP Tour. It was the seventeenth edition of the tournament and was held from 5 October until 11 October 1998. Unseeded Mariano Puerta won the singles title.

== Finals ==
=== Singles ===
(Argentina) Mariano Puerta defeated (Argentina) Franco Squillari, 6–3, 6–2

- It was Puerta's first singles title of his career.

=== Doubles ===
(United States) Donald Johnson / (United States) Francisco Montana defeated (Argentina) Pablo Albano / (Argentina) Daniel Orsanic, 6–4, 7–6
