= 2000 Campionati Internazionali di Sicilia =

- Date: 25 September – 1 October
- Edition: 22nd
- Category: International Series
- Draw: 32S / 16D
- Prize money: $350,000
- Surface: Clay / outdoor
- Location: Palermo, Italy

Champions

Singles
- (Belgium) Olivier Rochus

Doubles
- (Spain) Tomás Carbonell / (Argentina) Martín García
- Campionati Internazionali di Sicilia

The 2000 Campionati Internazionali di Sicilia was a men's tennis tournaments played on outdoor clay courts in Palermo, Italy that was part of the International Series of the 2000 ATP Tour. It was the 22nd edition of the tournament and was held from 25 September until 1 October 2000. Unseeded Olivier Rochus won the singles title.

== Finals ==
=== Singles ===
(Belgium) Olivier Rochus defeated (Italy) Diego Nargiso 7–6^{(16–14)}, 6–1

- It was Rochus's first singles title of his career.

=== Doubles ===
(Spain) Tomás Carbonell / (Argentina) Martín García defeated (Argentina) Pablo Albano / (Germany) Marc-Kevin Goellner walkover
