= 2001 Campionati Internazionali di Sicilia – Singles =

Singles
- 2001 Campionati Internazionali di Sicilia

Final
- Champion: (Spain) Félix Mantilla
- Runner-up: (Argentina) David Nalbandian
- Score: 7–6^{(7–2)}, 6–4

Details
- Draw: 32
- Seeds: 8

Events
Singles	Doubles
- Campionati Internazionali di Sicilia

Olivier Rochus was the defending champion but did not compete that year.

Félix Mantilla won in the final 7–6^{(7–2)}, 6–4 against David Nalbandian.

== Seeds ==
A champion seed is indicated in bold text while text in italics indicates the round in which that seed was eliminated.

1. (Spain) Àlex Corretja (second round)
2. (Spain) Carlos Moyá (first round)
3. (Spain) Albert Portas (semifinals)
4. (Spain) Tommy Robredo (semifinals)
5. (Spain) Albert Costa (quarterfinals)
6. (Sweden) Andreas Vinciguerra (second round)
7. (Argentina) Franco Squillari (second round)
8. (Spain) Galo Blanco (second round)

== Draw ==
Key

- Q = Qualifier
- WC = Wild card
- LL = Lucky loser
- Alt = Alternate
- ITF = ITF entry
- PR = Protected ranking
- SR = Special ranking
- SE = Special exempt
- JE = Junior exempt
- JR = Junior Accelerator Programme entrant
- CO = College Accelerator Programme entrant
- NG = Next Gen Accelerator Program entrant
- w/o = Walkover
- r = Retired
- d = Defaulted

First round
WC/1	(Spain) **À Corretja**	**7**	**6**
Q	(Argentina) M Puerta	5	4
(Argentina) **M Zabaleta**	**6**	**6**
(Spain) S Bruguera	3	1
(Spain) A Montañés	**6**	6^{2}	2
(Spain) **F Mantilla**	3	**7^{7}**	**6**
Q	(Spain) J García-Sintes	3	1
8	(Spain) **G Blanco**	**6**	**6**
3	(Spain) **A Portas**	4	**6**	**6**
WC	(Italy) F Volandri	**6**	3	4
Q	(Germany) O Gross	6^{4}	1
(Argentina) **J Acasuso**	**7^{7}**	**6**
(Spain) **D Sánchez**	**6**	4	**7^{7}**
Q	(Germany) M-K Goellner	2	**6**	6^{4}
(Spain) J Balcells	6^{6}	**7**	2
7	(Argentina) **F Squillari**	**7^{8}**	5	**6**
6	(Sweden) **A Vinciguerra**	**6**	**6**
(Morocco) K Alami	1	2
(Spain) J Díaz	3	3
(Czech Republic) **J Vaněk**	**6**	**6**
WC	(Spain) R Carretero	5	1
(United States) **H Armando**	**7**	**6**
(Spain) G Puentes	3	0
4	(Spain) **T Robredo**	**6**	**6**
5	(Spain) **A Costa**	**6**	**6**
(United Kingdom) J Delgado	1	3
(Italy) **F Luzzi**	4	**6**	**6**
(Austria) M Hipfl	**6**	3	4
(Spain) **F Vicente**	**6**	**3**
(Italy) A Gaudenzi	1	0	r
(Argentina) **D Nalbandian**	**6**	4	**6**
2	(Spain) C Moyá	2	**6**	3

Second round
WC/1	(Spain) À Corretja	4	5
(Argentina) **M Zabaleta**	**6**	**7**
(Spain) **F Mantilla**	**6**	**6**
8	(Spain) G Blanco	3	1
3	(Spain) **A Portas**	**7^{7}**	4	**6**
(Argentina) J Acasuso	6^{2}	**6**	3
(Spain) **D Sánchez**	**6**	**2**
7	(Argentina) F Squillari	3	0	r
6	(Sweden) A Vinciguerra	6^{2}	2
(Czech Republic) **J Vaněk**	**7^{7}**	**6**
(United States) H Armando	6^{3}	2
4	(Spain) **T Robredo**	**7^{7}**	**6**
5	(Spain) **A Costa**	**6**	**6**
(Italy) F Luzzi	2	1
(Spain) F Vicente	4	4
(Argentina) **D Nalbandian**	**6**	**6**

Quarterfinals
(Argentina) M Zabaleta	0	0	r
(Spain) **F Mantilla**	**6**	**2**
3	(Spain) **A Portas**	**6**	**6**
(Spain) D Sánchez	3	3
(Czech Republic) J Vaněk	3	6^{5}
4	(Spain) **T Robredo**	**6**	**7^{7}**
5	(Spain) A Costa	4	**6**	5
(Argentina) **D Nalbandian**	**6**	3	**7**

Semifinals
(Spain) **F Mantilla**	2	**7^{7}**	**6**
3	(Spain) A Portas	**6**	6^{4}	3
4	(Spain) T Robredo	2	6^{4}
(Argentina) **D Nalbandian**	**6**	**7^{7}**

Final
(Spain) **Félix Mantilla**	**7^{7}**	**6**
(Argentina) David Nalbandian	6^{2}	4
