= 1998 Campionati Internazionali di Sicilia – Doubles =

Doubles
- 1998 Campionati Internazionali di Sicilia

Final
- Champions: (United States) Donald Johnson (United States) Francisco Montana
- Runners-up: (Argentina) Pablo Albano (Argentina) Daniel Orsanic
- Score: 6–4, 7–6

Details
- Draw: 16
- Seeds: 4

Events
Singles	Doubles
- Campionati Internazionali di Sicilia

The 1998 Campionati Internazionali di Sicilia was a men's tennis tournament played on outdoor clay courts in Palermo, Italy that was part of the International Series of the 1998 ATP Tour. It was the seventeenth edition of the tournament and was held from 5 October until 11 October 1998.

== Seeds ==
Champion seeds are indicated in bold text while text in italics indicates the round in which those seeds were eliminated.

1. (United States) **Donald Johnson** / (United States) **Francisco Montana (champions)**
2. (Czech Republic) Jiří Novák / (Czech Republic) David Rikl (semifinals)
3. (Argentina) Pablo Albano / (Argentina) Daniel Orsanic (final)
4. (Argentina) Lucas Arnold Ker / (Australia) Andrew Kratzmann (quarterfinals)

== Draw ==
Key

- Q = Qualifier
- WC = Wild card
- LL = Lucky loser
- Alt = Alternate
- ITF = ITF entry
- PR = Protected ranking
- SR = Special ranking
- SE = Special exempt
- JE = Junior exempt
- JR = Junior Accelerator Programme entrant
- CO = College Accelerator Programme entrant
- NG = Next Gen Accelerator Program entrant
- w/o = Walkover
- r = Retired
- d = Defaulted

=== Finals ===
First round
1	(United States) **D Johnson** **(United States) F Montana**	5	**6**	**7**
(Czech Republic) L Pimek (South Africa) P Rosner	**7**	4	5
(Socialist Federal Republic of Yugoslavia) **N Djordjevic** **(Czech Republic) T Anzari**	2	**6**	**7**
(United States) B Coupe (United States) J Waite	**6**	4	6
4	(Argentina) **L Arnold** **(Australia) A Kratzmann**	**6**	**6**
(South Africa) M Barnard (Russia) A Olhovskiy	3	4
(Argentina) **L Lobo** **(Argentina) M Puerta**	**6**	**6**
(Italy) F Aldi (Italy) F Luzzi	3	2
(Romania) **D Pescariu** **(Italy) D Sanguinetti**	3	**7**	**6**
(Australia) P Kilderry (Hungary) G Köves	**6**	6	1
3	(Argentina) **P Albano** **(Argentina) D Orsanic**	**6**	**6**
(Ecuador) N Lapentti (Ecuador) G Lapentti	3	4
(Belgium) **T Vanhoudt** **(Netherlands) F Wibier**	0	**6**	**6**
(Italy) C Brandi (Italy) F Messori	**6**	3	2
2	(Czech Republic) **J Novák** **(Czech Republic) D Rikl**	**6**	5	**6**
(United States) D Bowen (United States) E Taino	1	**7**	4

Quarterfinals
1	(United States) **D Johnson** **(United States) F Montana**	**6**	**6**
(Socialist Federal Republic of Yugoslavia) N Djordjevic (Czech Republic) T Anzari	4	4
4	(Argentina) L Arnold (Australia) A Kratzmann	5	3
(Argentina) **L Lobo** **(Argentina) M Puerta**	**7**	**6**
(Romania) D Pescariu (Italy) D Sanguinetti	4	**7**	3
3	(Argentina) **P Albano** **(Argentina) D Orsanic**	**6**	6	**6**
(Belgium) T Vanhoudt (Netherlands) F Wibier	0	1
2	(Czech Republic) **J Novák** **(Czech Republic) D Rikl**	**6**	**6**

Semifinals
1	(United States) **D Johnson** **(United States) F Montana**	**7**	**6**
(Argentina) L Lobo (Argentina) M Puerta	5	3
3	(Argentina) **P Albano** **(Argentina) D Orsanic**	W/O
2	(Czech Republic) J Novák (Czech Republic) D Rikl

Final
1	(United States) **D Johnson** **(United States) F Montana**	**6**	**7**
3	(Argentina) P Albano (Argentina) D Orsanic	4	6
