= Tomislav Perić =

Croatian tennis player

- Country (sports): Croatia
- Born: April 10, 1983 (age 41)
- Plays: Right-handed
- Prize money: $31,282

Singles
- Career record: 0–1
- Highest ranking: No. 342 (15 Nov 2004)

Doubles
- Highest ranking: No. 632 (25 Aug 2003)

Tomislav Perić (born 10 April 1983) is a Croatian former professional tennis player.

He was a member of the Croatian team that were runners-up to United States in the 1999 Junior Davis Cup. Perić reached a best singles world ranking of 342 on the professional tour, winning four ITF Futures titles. He was a semi-finalist at the 2004 Dubrovnik Challenger and qualified for his only ATP Tour main draw at the 2006 Grand Prix Hassan II.

Perić is a former coach of British player James Ward.

== ITF Futures titles ==
=== Singles: (4) ===
| No. | Date | Tournament | Surface | Opponent | Score |
|---|---|---|---|---|---|
| 1. | Aug 2004 | Spain F19, Irun | Clay | (China) Zhu Benqiang | 6–4, 7–6^{(5)} |
| 2. | Oct 2004 | Spain F27, Córdoba | Hard | (Spain) Esteban Carril | 7–6^{(4)}, 6–4 |
| 3. | Oct 2006 | Spain F31, Martos | Hard | (Germany) Tony Holzinger | 6–3, 6–2 |
| 4. | Oct 2006 | Spain F32, El Ejido | Hard | (Spain) David Marrero | 6–3, 6–4 |
