= 2003 Grand Prix Hassan II – Singles =

Tennis tournament

Singles
- 2003 Grand Prix Hassan II

Final
- Champion: (France) Julien Boutter
- Runner-up: (Morocco) Younes El Aynaoui
- Score: 6–2, 2–6, 6–1

Details
- Draw: 32
- Seeds: 8

Events
Singles	Doubles
- Grand Prix Hassan II

Younes El Aynaoui was the defending champion but lost in the final 6–2, 2–6, 6–1 against Julien Boutter.

== Seeds ==
1. (Morocco) Younes El Aynaoui (final)
2. (France) Paul-Henri Mathieu (first round)
3. (France) Arnaud Clément (first round)
4. (Slovakia) Dominik Hrbatý (semifinals)
5. (Belgium) Olivier Rochus (first round)
6. (Spain) Fernando Vicente (first round)
7. (Armenia) ~~Sargis Sargsian~~ (no show)
8. (Brazil) André Sá (first round)

== Draw ==
Key

- Q = Qualifier
- WC = Wild card
- LL = Lucky loser
- Alt = Alternate
- ITF = ITF entry
- PR = Protected ranking
- SR = Special ranking
- SE = Special exempt
- JE = Junior exempt
- JR = Junior Accelerator Programme entrant
- CO = College Accelerator Programme entrant
- NG = Next Gen Accelerator Program entrant
- w/o = Walkover
- r = Retired
- d = Defaulted

=== Finals ===
Semifinals
1	(Morocco) Younes El Aynaoui	6	3	6
(Morocco) Hicham Arazi	2	6	3
4	(Slovakia) Dominik Hrbatý	3	4
(France) Julien Boutter	6	6

Final
1	(Morocco) Younes El Aynaoui	2	6	1
(France) Julien Boutter	6	2	6

=== Top half ===
First round
1	(Morocco) Y El Aynaoui	3	6	6
(Spain) A Montañés	6	3	2
(Czech Republic) J Vaněk	4	6	5
(Sweden) M Norman	6	4	7
(Croatia) Ž Krajan	7^{7}	6
(Spain) A Portas	6^{4}	4
(Chile) N Massú	0	6	7^{7}
6	(Spain) F Vicente	6	3	6^{5}
3	(France) A Clément	4	7	2
(Brazil) F Meligeni	6	5	6
WC	(Morocco) M Tahiri	1	6^{12}
(Morocco) H Arazi	6	7^{14}
(France) O Mutis	6	5	6
Q	(Netherlands) D van Scheppingen	4	7	3
Q	(France) É Prodon	7^{7}	6
LL	(Spain) R Ramírez Hidalgo	6^{5}	2

Second round
1	(Morocco) Y El Aynaoui	6	3	6
(Sweden) M Norman	4	6	3
(Croatia) Ž Krajan	6	1	4
(Chile) N Massú	2	6	6
(Brazil) F Meligeni	3	0
(Morocco) H Arazi	6	6
(France) O Mutis	6	6
Q	(France) É Prodon	3	3

Quarter-finals
1	(Morocco) Y El Aynaoui	4	6	7
(Chile) N Massú	6	3	5
(Morocco) H Arazi	3	7^{11}	6
(France) O Mutis	6	6^{9}	4

Semi-finals
1	(Morocco) Y El Aynaoui	6	3	6
(Morocco) H Arazi	2	6	3

=== Bottom half ===
First round
5	(Belgium) O Rochus	6^{4}	3
Q	(Argentina) F Browne	7^{7}	6
(Argentina) F Squillari	6	6
WC	(Morocco) T Ouahabi	1	3
(Hungary) A Sávolt	2	6	7^{7}
Q	(Spain) Ó Hernández	6	3	6^{5}
WC	(Morocco) M El Aarej	3	6^{5}
4	(Slovakia) D Hrbatý	6	7^{7}
8	(Brazil) A Sá	4	0
(Peru) L Horna	6	6
(Italy) D Sanguinetti	5	6^{0}
(France) J Boutter	7	7^{7}
(France) A Dupuis	4	1
(Brazil) F Saretta	6	6
(Monaco) J-R Lisnard	6	6
2	(France) P-H Mathieu	2	4

Second round
Q	(Argentina) F Browne	1	7	6
(Argentina) F Squillari	6	5	4
(Hungary) A Sávolt	3	2
4	(Slovakia) D Hrbatý	6	6
(Peru) L Horna	7^{7}	3	4
(France) J Boutter	6^{4}	6	6
(Brazil) F Saretta	7	6
(Monaco) J-R Lisnard	5	4

Quarter-finals
Q	(Argentina) F Browne	7^{7}	3	0
4	(Slovakia) D Hrbatý	6^{5}	6	6
(France) J Boutter	7	7^{7}
(Brazil) F Saretta	5	6^{5}

Semi-finals
4	(Slovakia) D Hrbatý	3	4
(France) J Boutter	6	6
