= 2000 Campionati Internazionali di Sicilia – Doubles =

Doubles
- 2000 Campionati Internazionali di Sicilia

Final
- Champions: (Spain) Tomás Carbonell (Argentina) Martín García
- Runners-up: (Argentina) Pablo Albano (Germany) Marc-Kevin Goellner
- Score: Walkover

Details
- Draw: 16
- Seeds: 4

Events
| Singles | Doubles |
- Campionati Internazionali di Sicilia

Mariano Hood and Sebastián Prieto were the defending champions, but lost in the quarterfinals to Devin Bowen and Alberto Martín.

Tomás Carbonell and Martín García won the title after Pablo Albano and Marc-Kevin Goellner were forced to withdraw the final match.

== Seeds ==
1. (Spain) Tomás Carbonell / (Argentina) Martín García (champions)
2. (Sweden) Simon Aspelin / (Sweden) Johan Landsberg (quarterfinals)
3. (North Macedonia) Aleksandar Kitinov / (Sweden) Peter Nyborg (first round)
4. (Israel) Eyal Ran / (Belgium) Tom Vanhoudt (first round)

== Draw ==
Key

- Q = Qualifier
- WC = Wild card
- LL = Lucky loser
- Alt = Alternate
- ITF = ITF entry
- PR = Protected ranking
- SR = Special ranking
- SE = Special exempt
- JE = Junior exempt
- JR = Junior Accelerator Programme entrant
- CO = College Accelerator Programme entrant
- NG = Next Gen Accelerator Program entrant
- w/o = Walkover
- r = Retired
- d = Defaulted

=== Draw ===
First round
1 | (Spain) T Carbonell (Argentina) M García | 6 | 6
WC | (Italy) I Gaudi (Italy) M Martelli | 3 | 3
(Spain) J Balcells (Spain) JI Carrasco | 6 | 7^{7}
(Spain) A López Morón (Spain) J Velasco Jr. | 4 | 6^{0}
3 | (North Macedonia) A Kitinov (Sweden) P Nyborg | 5 | 2
(Czech Republic) T Cibulec (Czech Republic) L Friedl | 7 | 6
WC | (Italy) F Luzzi (Italy) S Tarallo | 2 | 4
(Italy) A Gaudenzi (Italy) D Nargiso | 6 | 6
(United States) D Bowen (Spain) A Martín | 6 | 6
(Spain) A Portas (United States) J Waite | 1 | 4
(Argentina) M Hood (Argentina) S Prieto | 6 | 6
4 | (Israel) E Ran (Belgium) T Vanhoudt | 2 | 3
WC | (Italy) U Vico (Russia) M Youzhny | 3 | 2
(Argentina) P Albano (Germany) MK Goellner | 6 | 6
Q | (Spain) E Benfele Álvarez (Brazil) A Prieto | 4 | 2
2 | (Sweden) S Aspelin (Sweden) J Landsberg | 6 | 6

Quarterfinals
1 | (Spain) T Carbonell (Argentina) M García | 6 | 4 | 6
(Spain) J Balcells (Spain) JI Carrasco | 2 | 6 | 4
(Czech Republic) T Cibulec (Czech Republic) L Friedl | 6 | 3 | 6
(Italy) A Gaudenzi (Italy) D Nargiso | 4 | 6 | 3
(United States) D Bowen (Spain) A Martín | 3 | 6 | 7
(Argentina) M Hood (Argentina) S Prieto | 6 | 3 | 5
(Argentina) P Albano (Germany) MK Goellner | 6 | 7^{7}
2 | (Sweden) S Aspelin (Sweden) J Landsberg | 1 | 6^{1}

Semifinals
1 | (Spain) T Carbonell (Argentina) M García | 6 | 6
(Czech Republic) T Cibulec (Czech Republic) L Friedl | 4 | 0
(United States) D Bowen (Spain) A Martín | 2 | 3
(Argentina) P Albano (Germany) MK Goellner | 6 | 6

Final
1 | (Spain) T Carbonell (Argentina) M García | w/o
(Argentina) P Albano (Germany) MK Goellner
