= Guillermo Cañas =

Argentine tennis player (born 1977)

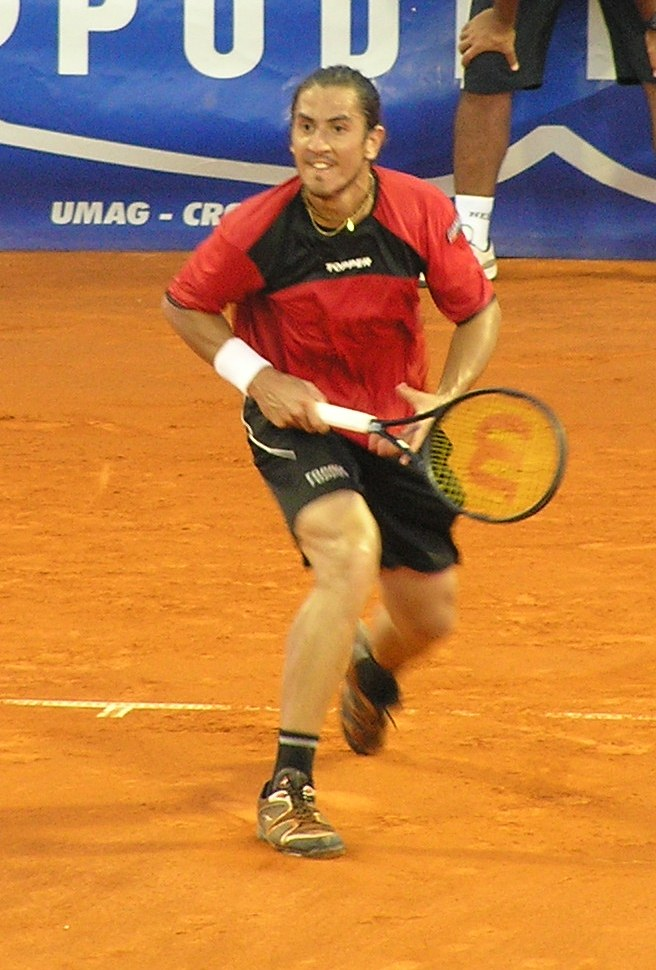
- Cañas at the 2007 Croatia Open
- Country (sports): Argentina
- Residence: Buenos Aires, Argentina
- Born: November 25, 1977 (age 48) Buenos Aires, Argentina
- Height: 1.85 m (6 ft 1 in)
- Turned pro: 1991
- Retired: 2010
- Plays: Right-handed (two-handed backhand)
- Prize money: $5,285,575

Singles
- Career record: 252–195 (56.4%)
- Career titles: 7
- Highest ranking: No. 8 (June 6, 2005)

Grand Slam singles results
- Australian Open: 4R (2004, 2005)
- French Open: QF (2002, 2005, 2007)
- Wimbledon: 4R (2001)
- US Open: 3R (2004)

Other tournaments
- Tour Finals: Alt (2004)
- Olympic Games: 2R (2008)

Doubles
- Career record: 61–82
- Career titles: 2
- Highest ranking: No. 47 (July 15, 2002)

Grand Slam doubles results
- Australian Open: 3R (2002)
- Wimbledon: 1R (2008)
- US Open: 2R (2008)

Other doubles tournaments
- Olympic Games: 1R (2008)

Guillermo "Willy" Ignacio Cañas (Latin American Spanish pronunciation: [ɡiˈʝeɾmo ˈkaɲas]; born November 25, 1977) is an Argentine former professional tennis player and coach. He was ranked world No. 8 in men's singles by the Association of Tennis Professionals (ATP), achieved in June 2005. Cañas won seven singles titles on the ATP Tour, including the 2002 Canada Masters, and reached the quarterfinals of the French Open three times. He was suspended in August 2005 for a doping violation, returning to the circuit in September 2006.

== Career ==
=== Early years ===
Cañas was born in Buenos Aires and named after Argentine tennis star Guillermo Vilas. He started playing at age 7. He turned professional in 1995, and began playing on the juniors circuit, enjoying some successes; these included a runner-up appearance at Surbiton, United Kingdom, and a win in the doubles event at the Italian Junior Championships, partnering Martín García.

From 1995 to 1999, Cañas played mainly Challenger Series tournaments. In April 1998, he broke into the top 100 for the first time, having won three Challenger tournaments in the previous 52 weeks. This allowed him to qualify for more ATP level tournaments, and he reached his first final in 1999 at Orlando, Florida. He also began to regularly qualify for Grand Slam tournaments, the most prestigious events in tennis.

In 2001, after a right wrist injury the previous year, he climbed from 227th place in the ATP rankings to the 15th, and was named ATP Comeback Player of Year. Cañas had won the first ATP level title of his career that season, in Casablanca, and reached the final of three other tournaments. In addition to this, he reached the fourth round of a Grand Slam tournament for the first time, achieving this result on two occasions, at the French Open and Wimbledon.

In the 2002 ATP Masters Series of Canada, an unseeded Cañas won his first ATP Masters Series title in Toronto, defeating Andy Roddick 6–4, 7–5 in the final. Cañas's path to the final saw him defeat a renowned set of players, including world number two Marat Safin, and top-ten ranked Yevgeny Kafelnikov and Roger Federer. Cañas was also the first Argentine to win the Canada Open since Guillermo Vilas in 1976 and the first to win a Masters Series shield (the Series was created in 1990). Cañas won one other tournament in 2002, the Chennai Open, and reached in the finals in Casablanca and Stuttgart. He also emerged as a more potent force at the Grand Slams as he reached his first quarterfinal at the French.

=== Doping ===
On August 8, 2005, Cañas was suspended for two years and was forced to forfeit $276,070 in prizes by the ATP after testing positive for a diuretic called hydrochlorothiazide, a substance with no benefits in itself other than as a treatment for hypertension, but used to cover other forbidden substances. No traces of any other forbidden substance were found in Cañas's sample, and the player asserts the diuretic was present in some medicine prescribed by ATP doctors Mercader and Chinchilla for a cold he contracted during the Acapulco tournament in Mexico. Just a few weeks before his ban started, Cañas had been at the highest ranking of his career, world number eight.

Cañas vowed to fight the ban, claiming he was innocent of the charges against him. Cañas took his case to the Court of Arbitration for Sport. His perseverance paid off on May 23, 2006, when he was acquitted of deliberate performance enhancement through illegal substances because the substances were in a prescription medicine. He was, however, considered careless in not checking the medicine before ingesting it. He was allowed to return to full professional activity from September 11, 2006, and the money prizes acquired before the suspension was restored. His points, which determine a player's ranking, were nil upon his return, having expired.

=== Return ===
Upon his return to the tour, Cañas won five Challenger titles and one ATP title (2007 Brasil Open). In the six months after his return, he had won 42 of 47 matches, going from being unranked to rank 60. He won his first ATP-level match since his September return on February 15, 2007, beating Marcos Daniel 6–1, 6–4.

On March 11, 2007, Cañas defeated ATP ranked number one Roger Federer 7–5, 6–2 at the Indian Wells Masters, ending Federer's streak of 41 consecutive victories, 5 short of Guillermo Vilas's record on ATP Tour matches. He defeated Federer again (7–6, 2–6, 7–6) 16 days later at the Miami Masters to back-up his victory at Indian Wells. This double victory made him the only player (besides Rafael Nadal) to have defeated Federer in consecutive tournaments since 2003. Cañas told the New York Times that "I came back very motivated, I came back with a lot of energy."

Cañas became the first qualifier to reach the semifinals of the Miami Masters. He made the final by beating Ivan Ljubičić, the seventh seed, 7–5, 6–2. In the final, the Argentine lost to Novak Djokovic of Serbia in straight sets. To get to the final, Cañas defeated Tim Henman, Juan Carlos Ferrero, Richard Gasquet, Roger Federer, Tommy Robredo, and Ivan Ljubičić, respectively, before losing to Novak Djoković. Cañas jumped 121 positions to reach the 22nd place in the ATP ranking as of April 30, 2007, the highest jump so far in the year.

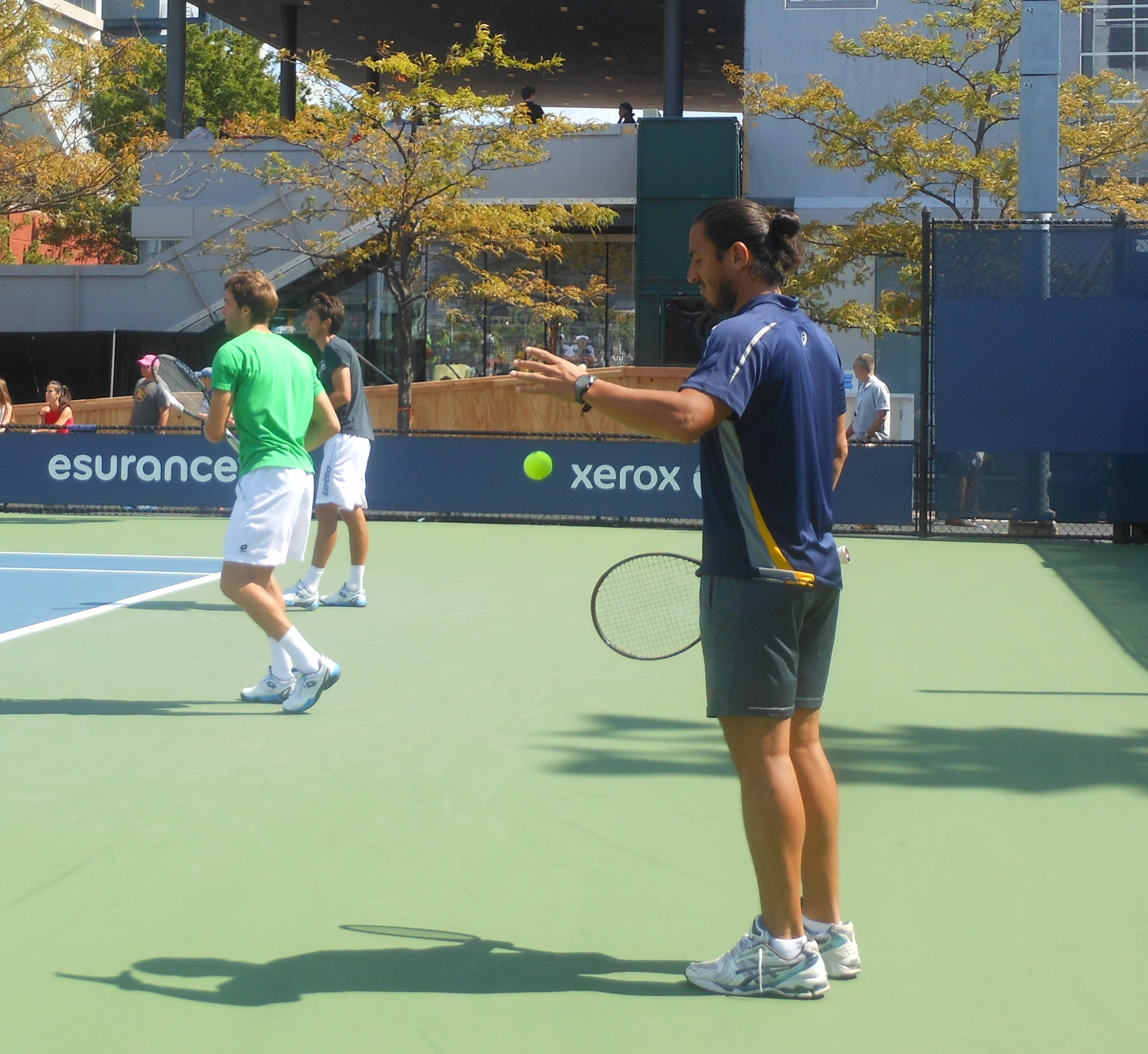
Guillermo Cañas coaching at the US Open after retiring as player

Cañas reached the final of one more tournament in 2007, the Torneo Godó in Barcelona, where he lost to Rafael Nadal. Cañas commented afterwards that he believed he would be a strong contender at the French Open. However, his bid was thwarted for a third time at the quarter-final stage when he lost to Nikolay Davydenko. Having set himself a goal of finishing in the top 20, Cañas finished the year in 15th, equalling his finishes from 2001 and 2002. He announced his retirement from professional tennis in March 2010. Cañas held a record of five victories and two defeats (3–1 in singles) in Davis Cup matches across his career.

== Post-retirement ==
Cañas was the coach of Ernests Gulbis from July 2011 until May 2012 and became the coach of Teymuraz Gabashvili in 2015. He coached Jelena Janković from January 2017 until her retirement. He now runs his own tennis academy in Aventura, Florida along with former tour pros Martín García and Gustavo Oribe. He is the current coach of Bernarda Pera.

== Playing style ==
Cañas played a defensive counter-punching game from the baseline, using his retrieving skills in order to frustrate opponents. He used a two-handed backhand.

== Significant finals ==
=== Masters 1000 finals ===
==== Singles: 2 (1 titles, 1 runner-ups) ====
Result	Year	Tournament	Surface	Opponent	Score
Win	2002	Canadian Masters	Hard	(United States) Andy Roddick	6–4, 7–5
Loss	2007	Miami Masters	Hard	(Serbia) Novak Djokovic	3–6, 2–6, 4–6

== Career finals ==
=== Singles: 16 (7 titles, 9 runner-ups) ===
Legend
Grand Slam (0–0)
Tennis Masters Cup /
ATP World Tour Finals (0–0)
ATP Masters Series /
ATP World Tour Masters 1000 (1–1)
ATP International Series Gold /
ATP World Tour 500 Series (1–4)
ATP International Series /
ATP World Tour 250 Series (5–4)

Result	W/L	Date	Tournament	Surface	Opponent	Score
Loss	0–1	Apr 1999	Orlando, US	Clay	(Sweden) Magnus Norman	0–6, 3–6
Win	1–1	Apr 2001	Casablanca, Morocco	Clay	(Spain) Tommy Robredo	7–5, 6–2
Loss	1–2	Jun 2001	s'Hertogenbosch, Netherlands	Grass	(Australia) Lleyton Hewitt	3–6, 4–6
Loss	1–3	Jul 2001	Stuttgart, Germany	Clay	(Brazil) Gustavo Kuerten	3–6, 2–6, 4–6
Loss	1–4	Oct 2001	Vienna, Austria	Hard (i)	(Germany) Tommy Haas	2–6, 6–7^{(6–8)}, 4–6
Win	2–4	Jan 2002	Chennai, India	Hard	(Thailand) Paradorn Srichaphan	6–4, 7–6^{(7–2)}
Loss	2–5	Apr 2002	Casablanca, Morocco	Clay	(Morocco) Younes El Aynaoui	6–3, 3–6, 2–6
Loss	2–6	Jul 2002	Stuttgart, Germany	Clay	(Russia) Mikhail Youzhny	3–6, 6–3, 6–3, 4–6, 4–6
Win	3–6	Jul 2002	Toronto, Canada	Hard	(United States) Andy Roddick	6–4, 7–5
Win	4–6	Jul 2004	Stuttgart, Germany	Clay	(Argentina) Gastón Gaudio	5–7, 6–2, 6–0, 1–6, 6–3
Win	5–6	Jul 2004	Umag, Croatia	Clay	(Italy) Filippo Volandri	7–5, 6–3
Win	6–6	Sep 2004	Shanghai, China	Hard	(Germany) Lars Burgsmüller	6–1, 6–0
Loss	6–7	Oct 2004	Vienna, Austria	Hard (i)	(Spain) Feliciano López	4–6, 6–1, 5–7, 6–3, 5–7
Win	7–7	Feb 2007	Costa do Sauípe, Brazil	Clay	(Spain) Juan Carlos Ferrero	7–6^{(7–4)}, 6–2
Loss	7–8	Apr 2007	Miami, US	Hard	(Serbia) Novak Djokovic	3–6, 2–6, 4–6
Loss	7–9	Apr 2007	Barcelona, Spain	Clay	(Spain) Rafael Nadal	3–6, 4–6

=== Doubles: 2 (2 titles) ===
Result	W/L	Date	Tournament	Surface	Partner	Opponents	Score
Win	1–0	Aug 1999	Boston, US	Hard	(Argentina) Martín García	(South Africa) Marius Barnard (United States) T. J. Middleton	5–7, 7–6^{(7–2)}, 6–4
Win	2–0	Jul 2001	Stuttgart, Germany	Clay	(Germany) Rainer Schüttler	(Australia) Michael Hill (United States) Jeff Tarango	4–6, 7–6^{(7–1)}, 6–4

== Career ATP Challenger finals ==
=== Singles: 15 (11–4) ===
Wins (11)

No.	Date	Tournament	Surface	Opponent	Score
1.	December 2, 1996	Santiago, Chile	Clay	(Argentina) Franco Squillari	7–6, 6–1
2.	August 25, 1997	Santa Cruz, Bolivia	Clay	(Brazil) Márcio Carlsson	6–2, 4–6, 6–2
3.	September 29, 1997	Santiago, Chile	Clay	(Netherlands) Dennis van Scheppingen	4–6, 7–5, 6–3
4.	April 20, 1998	Espinho, Portugal	Clay	(Argentina) Mariano Puerta	6–1, 2–6, 6–2
5.	September 14, 1998	Florianópolis, Brazil	Clay	(Brazil) Márcio Carlsson	6–2, 7–5
6.	December 29, 2003	Nouméa, New Caledonia	Hard	(Australia) Todd Reid	6–4, 6–3
7.	September 11, 2006	Belém, Brazil	Clay	(Argentina) Carlos Berlocq	4–6, 6–2, 7–6^{(10–8)}
8.	October 23, 2006	Montevideo, Uruguay	Clay	(Ecuador) Nicolás Lapentti	2–6, 6–3, 7–6^{(7–3)}
9.	November 6, 2006	Buenos Aires, Argentina	Clay	(Argentina) Martín Vassallo	6–3, 6–4
10.	November 13, 2006	Asunción, Paraguay	Clay	(Brazil) Flávio Saretta	6–4, 6–1
11.	January 1, 2007	São Paulo, Brazil	Clay	(Argentina) Diego Hartfield	6–3, 6–4

Runner-ups (4)

No.	Date	Tournament	Surface	Opponent	Score
1.	March 9, 1998	Salinas, Ecuador	Hard	(Brazil) André Sá	7–5, 5–7, 6–4
2.	March 29, 1999	Barletta, Italy	Clay	(Spain) Jacobo Díaz	6–7^{(6–8)}, 6–0, 6–3
3.	April 12, 1999	Bermuda, Bermuda	Clay	(Argentina) Hernán Gumy	6–3, 7–6^{(7–3)}
4.	October 2, 2006	Quito, Ecuador	Clay	(Australia) Chris Guccione	6–3, 7–6^{(7–4)}

=== Doubles ===
Wins (5)

No.	Date	Tournament	Surface	Partner	Opponents	Score
1.	November 16, 1998	Buenos Aires, Argentina	Clay	(Argentina) Martín García	(Spain) Alberto Martín (Spain) Salvador Navarro	6–7^{(5–7)}, 6–1, 6–4
2.	March 29, 1999	Barletta, Italy	Clay	(Spain) Javier Sánchez	(Argentina) Gastón Gaudio (Argentina) Hernán Gumy	4–6, 6–2, 6–2
3.	November 15, 1999	Buenos Aires, Argentina	Clay	(Argentina) Martín García	(South Africa) Paul Rosner (Federal Republic of Yugoslavia) Dušan Vemić	6–4, 6–4
4.	December 4, 2000	San José, Costa Rica	Hard	(Chile) Adrián García	(United States) Devin Bowen (United States) Brandon Coupe	7–6^{(7–5)}, 6–1
5.	November 10, 2008	Dnipropetrovsk, Ukraine	Hard (i)	(Russia) Dmitry Tursunov	(Poland) Łukasz Kubot (Austria) Oliver Marach	6–3, 7–6^{(7–5)}

== Performance timeline ==
Key
W	F	SF	QF	#R	RR	Q#	DNQ	A	NH

(W) winner; (F) finalist; (SF) semifinalist; (QF) quarterfinalist; (#R) rounds 4, 3, 2, 1; (RR) round-robin stage; (Q#) qualification round; (DNQ) did not qualify; (A) absent; (NH) not held; (SR) strike rate (events won / competed); (W–L) win–loss record.

=== Singles ===
Tournament	1994	1995	1996	1997	1998	1999	2000	2001	2002	2003	2004	2005	2006	2007	2008	2009	Career SR	Career win–loss
Australian Open	A	A	A	A	A	1R	1R	2R	3R	2R	4R	4R	A	A	A	2R	0 / 8	11–8
French Open	A	A	A	Q1	Q2	2R	1R	4R	QF	A	1R	QF	A	QF	1R	Q1	0 / 8	16–8
Wimbledon	A	A	A	Q2	2R	2R	1R	4R	2R	A	1R	A	A	3R	1R	2R	0 / 9	9–9
US Open	A	A	Q2	A	2R	2R	A	2R	A	A	3R	A	A	2R	1R	A	0 / 6	6–6
Grand Slam W–L^{1}	0–0	0–0	0–0	0–0	2–2	3–4	0–3	8–4	7–3	1–1	5–4	7–2	0–0	7–3	0–3	2–2	0/31	42–31
Indian Wells Masters	A	A	A	A	A	A	A	A	1R	A	2R	SF	A	3R	4R	1R	0 / 6	9–6
Miami Masters	A	A	Q1	Q1	2R	A	2R	A	3R	A	4R	2R	A	F	4R	1R	0 / 8	8–8
Monte-Carlo Masters	A	A	A	A	A	A	A	A	2R	A	1R	2R	A	A	A	A	0 / 3	2–3
Rome Masters	A	A	A	Q1	A	A	A	A	1R	A	2R	3R	A	2R	2R	A	0 / 5	4–5
Hamburg Masters	A	A	A	A	A	A	A	A	3R	A	1R	2R	A	1R	1R	NM1	0 / 5	3–5
Canada Masters	A	A	A	A	2R	A	A	A	W	A	A	A	A	1R	1R	A	1 / 4	7–3
Cincinnati Masters	A	A	A	A	A	A	A	3R	1R	A	A	A	A	1R	A	A	0 / 3	2–3
Madrid Masters (Note: Held in Stuttgart from 1996 to 2001, held in Madrid on hard court (indoors) from 2002 to 2008, and held on clay court in 2009.)	A	A	A	A	A	Q1	A	3R	2R	A	2R	A	A	3R	Q2	1R	0 / 5	4–5
Paris Masters	A	A	A	A	A	Q2	A	2R	3R	A	SF	A	A	3R	1R	A	0 / 5	5–5
Total titles	0	0	0	0	0	0	0	2	1	0	3	0	0	1	0	0	N/A	7
Overall win–loss	0–0	0–0	0–3	1–4	6–14	15–24	5–12	44–21	45–23	5–4	40–22	23–11	0–0	39–21	21–22		N/A	244–181
Year-end ranking	557	365	183	129	95	71	231	15	15	272	12	102	142	15	79	191	N/A	N/A

== Top 10 wins ==
Season	1994	1995	1996	1997	1998	1999	2000	2001	2002	2003	2004	2005	2006	2007	2008	2009	Total
Wins	0	0	0	0	0	1	0	4	7	0	2	1	0	5	0	0	20

#	Player	Rank	Event	Surface	Rd	Score	Cañas Rank
1999
1.	(United Kingdom) Tim Henman	5	US Open, New York, United States	Hard	1R	7–6^{(7–1)}, 6–4, 6–3	68
2001
2.	(Russia) Yevgeny Kafelnikov	7	Wimbledon, London	Grass	3R	3–6, 6–1, 6–3, 7–6^{(7–2)}	49
3.	(Russia) Yevgeny Kafelnikov	6	Stuttgart, Germany	Clay	QF	4–6, 6–3, 6–3	39
4.	(Russia) Marat Safin	3	Cincinnati, United States	Hard	1R	6–3, 6–3	33
5.	(United Kingdom) Tim Henman	8	Vienna, Austria	Hard (i)	2R	3–6, 7–6^{(7–4)}, 7–6^{(7–5)}	21
2002
6.	(Sweden) Thomas Johansson	9	World Team Cup, Düsseldorf	Clay	RR	6–2, 4–6, 6–0	17
7.	(Russia) Yevgeny Kafelnikov	5	World Team Cup, Düsseldorf	Clay	F	6–4, 6–2	17
8.	(Australia) Lleyton Hewitt	1	French Open, Paris	Clay	4R	6–7^{(1–7)}, 7–6^{(15–13)}, 6–4, 6–3	17
9.	(Switzerland) Roger Federer	10	Toronto, Canada	Hard	1R	7–6^{(12–10)}, 7–5	19
10.	(Russia) Yevgeny Kafelnikov	5	Toronto, Canada	Hard	3R	6–2, 6–2	19
11.	(Russia) Marat Safin	2	Toronto, Canada	Hard	QF	7–5, 6–3	19
12.	(Germany) Tommy Haas	3	Toronto, Canada	Hard	SF	6–4, 3–6, 7–6^{(7–5)}	19
2004
13.	(United States) Andy Roddick	2	Rome, Italy	Clay	1R	7–6^{(9–7)}, 6–1	80
14.	(Argentina) David Nalbandian	10	Vienna, Austria	Hard (i)	QF	6–4, 2–6, 6–3	26
2005
15.	(United Kingdom) Tim Henman	6	Indian Wells, United States	Hard	QF	7–6^{(7–1)}, 7–5	14
2007
16.	(Argentina) David Nalbandian	10	Buenos Aires, Argentina	Clay	RR	6–4, 6–4	63
17.	(Switzerland) Roger Federer	1	Indian Wells, United States	Hard	2R	7–5, 6–2	60
18.	(Switzerland) Roger Federer	1	Miami, United States	Hard	4R	7–6^{(7–2)}, 2–6, 7–6^{(7–5)}	55
19.	(Spain) Tommy Robredo	6	Miami, United States	Hard	QF	7–6^{(7–5)}, 6–1	55
20.	(Croatia) Ivan Ljubičić	7	Miami, United States	Hard	SF	7–5, 6–2	55

== See also ==
- List of sportspeople sanctioned for doping offences
