= Arnaud Di Pasquale =

French tennis player (born 1979)

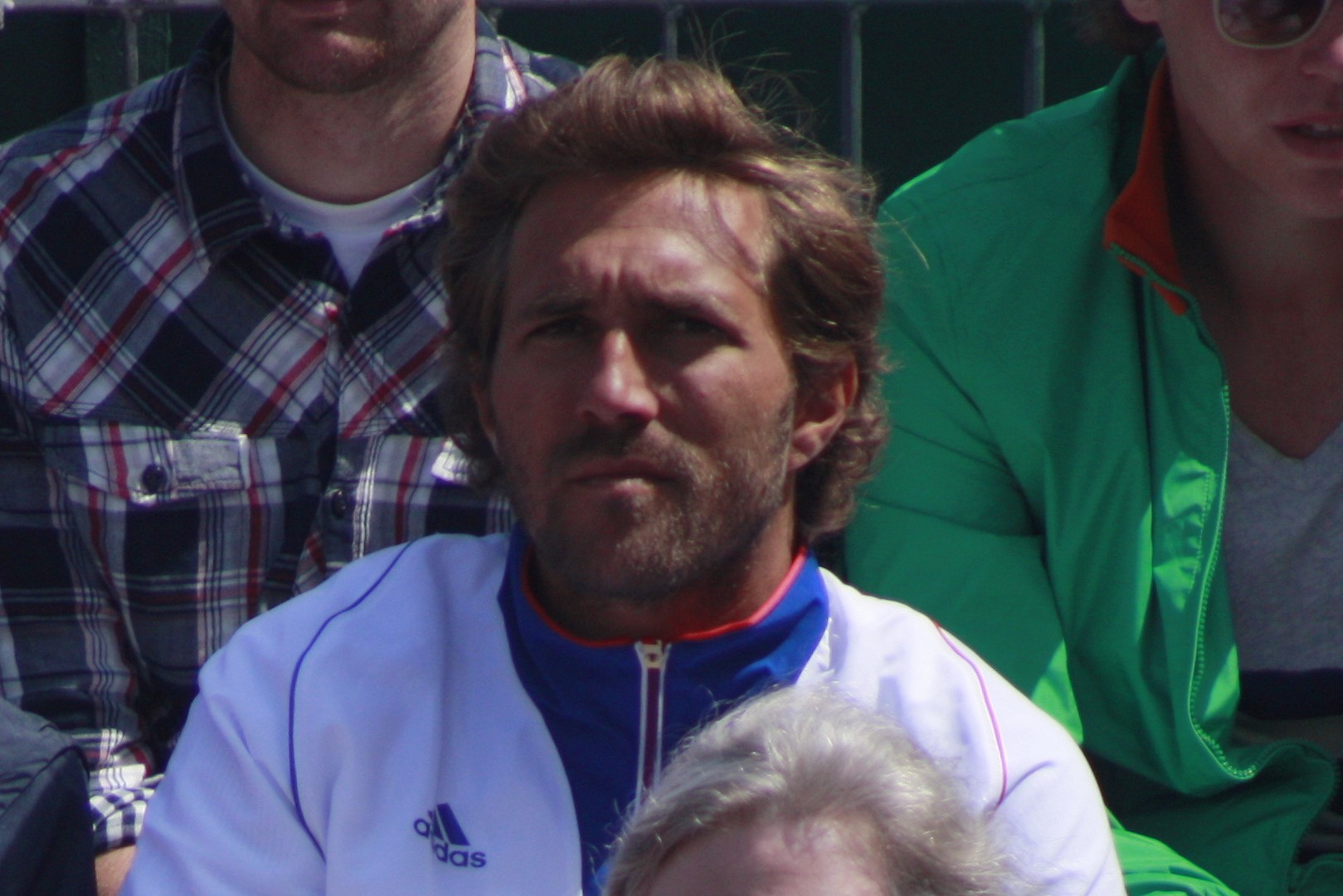
- Country (sports): France
- Residence: Geneva, Switzerland
- Born: 11 February 1979 (age 47) Casablanca, Morocco
- Height: 1.85 m (6 ft 1 in)
- Turned pro: 1998
- Retired: 2007
- Plays: Right-handed (one-handed backhand)
- Prize money: $1,162,796

Singles
- Career record: 69–98
- Career titles: 1
- Highest ranking: No. 39 (17 April 2000)

Grand Slam singles results
- Australian Open: 1R (1999, 2001, 2003)
- French Open: 4R (1999, 2002)
- Wimbledon: 2R (2000)
- US Open: 2R (1998, 2000)

Other tournaments
- Olympic Games: Bronze (2000)

Doubles
- Career record: 3–10
- Career titles: 0
- Highest ranking: No. 320 (23 April 2001)

Grand Slam doubles results
- French Open: 2R (2002)
- Last updated on: 20 September 2021.

Arnaud Di Pasquale (French: [aʁno dipaskwal]; born 11 February 1979) is a former professional tennis player from France.

== Tennis career ==
=== Juniors ===
Di Pasquale excelled as a junior, posting a 103–25 record in singles and reaching the No. 1 ranking in December 1997 (and No. 17 in doubles). He won the boys' singles competition at the 1997 US Open (and made the semifinals of the Australian and French Open).

== Junior Grand Slam finals ==
=== Singles (1 title) ===
Result	Year	Championship	Surface	Opponent	Score
Win	1997	US Open	Hard	(South Africa) Wesley Whitehouse	6–7, 6–4, 6–1

=== Doubles (1 runner-up) ===
Result	Year	Championship	Surface	Partnet	Opponents	Score
Loss	1997	French Open	Clay	(France) Julien Jeanpierre	(Peru) Luis Horna (Venezuela) José de Armas	4–6, 6–2, 5–7

=== Pro tour ===
Di Pasquale is best known for winning the bronze medal at the 2000 Summer Olympics in the men's singles event. He beat Nicolas Kiefer, Vladimir Voltchkov, Juan Carlos Ferrero and rising Roger Federer in the bronze medal match, but more surprising was his straight-sets victory over the well-established Magnus Norman of Sweden in the tournament's third round. He also reached the fourth round of the French Open in both 1999 and 2002 and won one singles title (in Palermo, 1999).

== Olympic finals ==
=== Singles: (1 bronze medal) ===
Result	Year	Championship	Surface	Opponent	Score
Bronze	2000	Sydney Olympics	Hard	(Switzerland) Roger Federer	7–6^{(7–5)}, 6–7^{(7–9)}, 6–3

== ATP career finals ==
=== Singles: 2 (1 title, 1 runner-up) ===
Legend Grand Slam tournaments (0–0) ATP World Tour Finals (0–0) ATP Masters Series (0–0) ATP Championship Series (0–0) ATP International Series (1–1)	Finals by surface Hard (0–0) Clay (1–1) Grass (0–0)	Titles by setting Outdoor (1–1) Indoor (0–0)

Result	W–L	Date	Tournament	Tier	Surface	Opponent	Score
Loss	0–1	Sep 1998	Bucharest, Romania	International Series	Clay	(Spain) Francisco Clavet	6–1, 7–6^{(7–2)}
Win	1–1	Oct 1999	Palermo, Italy	International Series	Clay	(Spain) Alberto Berasategui	6–1, 6–3

== ATP Challenger and ITF Futures finals ==
=== Singles: 7 (2–5) ===
Legend ATP Challenger (2–4) ITF Futures (0–1)	Finals by surface Hard (0–0) Clay (2–5) Grass (0–0) Carpet (0–0)

Result	W–L	Date	Tournament	Tier	Surface	Opponent	Score
Loss	0–1	Apr 1998	Nice, France	Challenger	Clay	(Argentina) Mariano Puerta	7–6, 4–6, 4–6
Win	1–1	Jun 1998	Příbram, Czech Republic	Challenger	Clay	(Czech Republic) Radek Štěpánek	6–3, 6–1
Loss	1–2	Jul 1998	Contrexéville, France	Challenger	Clay	(Morocco) Younes El Aynaoui	4–6, 7–6, 0–6
Win	2–2	May 2002	Ljubljana, Slovenia	Challenger	Clay	(Spain) Joan Balcells	6–4, 6–3
Loss	2–3	Apr 2004	Napoli, Italy	Challenger	Clay	(Luxembourg) Gilles Müller	6–7^{(7–9)}, 7–6^{(7–1)}, 1–6
Loss	2–4	Apr 2006	France F6, Grasse	Futures	Clay	(France) Nicolas Coutelot	2–6, 2–6
Loss	2–5	Jun 2006	Milan, Italy	Challenger	Clay	(United States) Wayne Odesnik	7–5, 2–6, 6–7^{(5–7)}

== Performance timeline ==
Key
W	F	SF	QF	#R	RR	Q#	DNQ	A	NH

(W) winner; (F) finalist; (SF) semifinalist; (QF) quarterfinalist; (#R) rounds 4, 3, 2, 1; (RR) round-robin stage; (Q#) qualification round; (DNQ) did not qualify; (A) absent; (NH) not held; (SR) strike rate (events won / competed); (W–L) win–loss record.

=== Singles ===
Tournament	1998	1999	2000	2001	2002	2003	2004	2005	2006	SR	W–L	Win %
Grand Slam tournaments
Australian Open	A	1R	A	1R	A	1R	A	Q1	A	0 / 3	0–3	0%
French Open	1R	4R	1R	1R	4R	A	1R	A	Q1	0 / 6	6–6	50%
Wimbledon	A	1R	2R	A	A	A	A	A	A	0 / 2	1–2	33%
US Open	2R	1R	2R	1R	Q2	A	1R	A	A	0 / 5	2–5	29%
Win–loss	1–2	3–4	2–3	0–3	3–1	0–1	0–2	0–0	0–0	0 / 16	9–16	36%
ATP Tour Masters 1000
Indian Wells Masters	A	1R	2R	2R	A	Q1	A	A	A	0 / 3	2–3	40%
Miami Open	A	1R	1R	1R	A	A	A	A	A	0 / 3	0–3	0%
Monte Carlo	A	3R	1R	3R	Q1	A	A	A	A	0 / 3	4–3	57%
Rome	A	Q2	2R	Q2	A	A	A	A	A	0 / 1	1–1	50%
Hamburg	A	QF	3R	1R	A	A	A	A	A	0 / 3	5–3	63%
Canada Masters	A	A	1R	A	A	A	A	A	A	0 / 1	0–1	0%
Cincinnati Masters	A	2R	1R	Q2	A	A	A	A	A	0 / 2	1–2	33%
Stuttgart	A	Q1	Q2	A	Not Held					0 / 0	0–0	–
Paris Masters	2R	1R	1R	A	Q1	A	A	A	A	0 / 3	1–3	25%
Win–loss	1–1	6–6	4–8	3–4	0–0	0–0	0–0	0–0	0–0	0 / 19	14–19	42%
