= 2012 Morocco Tennis Tour – Marrakech – Doubles =

Marrakech – Doubles
- 2012 Morocco Tennis Tour – Marrakech

Final
- Champions: (Slovakia) Martin Kližan; (Spain) Daniel Muñoz de la Nava
- Runners-up: (Spain) Íñigo Cervantes Huegun; (Argentina) Federico Delbonis
- Score: 6–3, 1–6, [12–10]

Events
Singles	Doubles
← 2011 ·	Morocco Tennis Tour – Marrakech	· 2013 →

Peter Luczak and Alessandro Motti were the defending champions but decided not to participate.
Martin Kližan and Daniel Muñoz de la Nava won the title, defeating Íñigo Cervantes Huegun and Federico Delbonis 6–3, 1–6, [12–10] in the final.

== Seeds ==
1. (Italy) Alessio di Mauro / (Italy) Alessandro Motti (quarterfinals)
2. (Spain) Daniel Gimeno Traver / (Spain) Javier Martí (withdrew)
3. (Belarus) Aliaksandr Bury / (Poland) Mateusz Kowalczyk (quarterfinals)
4. (Spain) Gerard Granollers / (Spain) Pere Riba (withdrew)

== Draw ==
=== Key ===
- Q = Qualifier
- WC = Wild card
- LL = Lucky loser
- Alt = Alternate
- SE = Special exempt
- PR = Protected ranking
- ITF = ITF entry
- JE = Junior exempt
- w/o = Walkover
- r = Retired
- d = Defaulted
- SR = Special ranking

=== Draw ===
First round

Quarterfinals

Semifinals

Final

1
- (Italy) A di Mauro
- (Italy) A Motti
w/o

Alt
- (Germany) S Greul
- (Germany) B Knittel

1
- (Italy) A di Mauro
- (Italy) A Motti
4
2

- (Spain) I Cervantes Huegun
- (Argentina) F Delbonis
6
6

- (Spain) I Cervantes Huegun
- (Argentina) F Delbonis
6
6

WC
- (Morocco) Y Idmbarek
- (Morocco) T Ouahabi
3
1

- (Spain) I Cervantes Huegun
- (Argentina) F Delbonis
6
6

Alt
- (Spain) D De Miguel
- (Spain) I Sevilla
4
4

- (Slovenia) A Bedene
- (Serbia) Zekić
3
1

WC
- (Morocco) A Fattar
- (Morocco) Y Rachidi
6
6

WC
- (Morocco) A Fattar
- (Morocco) Y Rachidi
3
4

- (Slovenia) A Bedene
- (Serbia) Zekić
6
1
[12]

- (Slovenia) A Bedene
- (Serbia) Zekić
6
6

- (Italy) A Giannessi
- (Italy) W Trusendi
3
6
[10]

- (Spain) I Cervantes Huegun
- (Argentina) F Delbonis
3
6
[10]

- (Portugal) J Sousa
- (Germany) J-L Struff
6
4
[8]

- (Slovakia) M Kližan
- (Spain) D Muñoz de la Nava
6
1
[12]

- (Slovakia) M Kližan
- (Spain) D Muñoz de la Nava
1
6
[10]

- (Slovakia) M Kližan
- (Spain) D Muñoz de la Nava
6
6

- (France) J Dasnières de Veigy
- (France) M Gicquel
6^{4}
6
[25]

3
- (Belarus) A Bury
- (Poland) M Kowalczyk
3
4

3
- (Belarus) A Bury
- (Poland) M Kowalczyk
7^{7}
4
[27]

- (Slovakia) M Kližan
- (Spain) D Muñoz de la Nava
6
6

- (Italy) A Arnaboldi
- (Spain) A Menéndez
6
6

- (Italy) A Arnaboldi
- (Spain) A Menéndez
1
1

WC
- (Morocco) M Saber
- (Morocco) M Ziadi
2
0

- (Italy) A Arnaboldi
- (Spain) A Menéndez
6
6

- (France) A Gensse
- (France) S Robert
w/o

- (France) A Gensse
- (France) S Robert
3
1

2
- (Spain) D Gimeno Traver
- (Spain) J Martí
