= 2010 Morocco Tennis Tour – Marrakech – Doubles =

Marrakech – Doubles
- 2010 Morocco Tennis Tour – Marrakech

Final
- Champions: (Serbia) Ilija Bozoljac; (Romania) Horia Tecău
- Runners-up: (United States) James Cerretani; (Canada) Adil Shamasdin
- Score: 6–1, 6–1

Events
Singles	Doubles
← 2009 ·	Morocco Tennis Tour – Marrakech	· 2011 →

Rubén Ramírez Hidalgo and Santiago Ventura were the defending champions, but they chose to compete in the 2010 Città di Caltanissetta instead.
Ilija Bozoljac and Horia Tecău won in the final 6–1, 6–1, against James Cerretani and Adil Shamasdin.

== Seeds ==
1. (Germany) Michael Kohlmann / (Finland) Jarkko Nieminen (semifinals)
2. (Czech Republic) Leoš Friedl / (Czech Republic) David Škoch (semifinals)
3. (United Kingdom) Jonathan Marray / (United Kingdom) Jamie Murray (first round)
4. (Italy) Daniele Bracciali / (Israel) Jonathan Erlich (quarterfinals)

== Draw ==
=== Key ===
- Q = Qualifier
- WC = Wild card
- LL = Lucky loser
- Alt = Alternate
- SE = Special exempt
- PR = Protected ranking
- ITF = ITF entry
- JE = Junior exempt
- w/o = Walkover
- r = Retired
- d = Defaulted
- SR = Special ranking

=== Draw ===
First round

Quarterfinals

Semifinals

Finals

1
- (Germany) M Kohlmann
- (Finland) J Nieminen
2
6
[10]

WC
- (Morocco) R Chaki
- (Morocco) R El Amrani
6
4
[4]

1
- (Germany) M Kohlmann
- (Finland) J Nieminen
6
6

WC
- (Morocco) M Saber
- (Morocco) M Ziadi
6
5
[10]

WC
- (Morocco) M Saber
- (Morocco) M Ziadi
1
1

WC
- (Morocco) A Fattar
- (Morocco) Y Idmbarek
4
7
[4]

1
- (Germany) M Kohlmann
- (Finland) J Nieminen
4
6^{8}

3
- (United Kingdom) J Marray
- (United Kingdom) J Murray
4
4

- (United States) J Cerretani
- (Canada) A Shamasdin
6
7

- (United States) J Cerretani
- (Canada) A Shamasdin
6
6

- (United States) J Cerretani
- (Canada) A Shamasdin
5
7
[10]

- (Switzerland) Y Allegro
- (South Africa) J Coetzee
6
7

- (Switzerland) Y Allegro
- (South Africa) J Coetzee
7
6^{5}
[7]

- (Belgium) S Darcis
- (Italy) A Motti
3
6^{4}

- (United States) J Cerretani
- (Canada) A Shamasdin
1
1

- (Serbia) I Bozoljac
- (Romania) H Tecău
6
6

- (Serbia) I Bozoljac
- (Romania) H Tecău
6
6

- (United Kingdom) J Delgado
- (India) H Mankad
4
2

- (Serbia) I Bozoljac
- (Romania) H Tecău
6
7

- (Romania) V Crivoi
- (Slovenia) B Kavčič
3
6^{3}

4
- (Italy) D Bracciali
- (Israel) J Erlich
3
5

4
- (Italy) D Bracciali
- (Israel) J Erlich
6
7

- (Serbia) I Bozoljac
- (Romania) H Tecău
6
5
[13]

- (Ukraine) O Dolgopolov Jr.
- (Russia) D Sitak
2
3

2
- (Czech Republic) L Friedl
- (Czech Republic) D Škoch
3
7
[11]

- (Poland) T Bednarek
- (Poland) M Kowalczyk
6
6

- (Poland) T Bednarek
- (Poland) M Kowalczyk
5
6
[2]

- (Spain) P Andújar
- (Spain) M Granollers
6^{3}
1

2
- (Czech Republic) L Friedl
- (Czech Republic) D Škoch
7
3
[10]

2
- (Czech Republic) L Friedl
- (Czech Republic) D Škoch
7
6
