= 2011 Morocco Tennis Tour – Marrakech – Singles =

Marrakech – Singles
- 2011 Morocco Tennis Tour – Marrakech

Final
- Champion: (Portugal) Rui Machado
- Runner-up: (France) Maxime Teixeira
- Score: 6–3, 6–7^{(7–9)}, 6–4

Events
Singles	Doubles
- Morocco Tennis Tour – Marrakech

Jarkko Nieminen was the defending champion, but chose not to compete this year.
Rui Machado defeated Maxime Teixeira 6–3, 6–7^{(7–9)}, 6–4 in the final.

== Seeds ==
1. (Portugal) Rui Machado (champion)
2. (Czech Republic) Jan Hájek (semifinals)
3. (Spain) Albert Ramos (quarterfinals)
4. (Czech Republic) Jaroslav Pospíšil (first round)
5. (Netherlands) Jesse Huta Galung (quarterfinals)
6. (Kazakhstan) Yuri Schukin (second round)
7. (Argentina) Federico del Bonis (first round)
8. (France) Vincent Millot (second round)

== Draw ==
Key

- Q = Qualifier
- WC = Wild card
- LL = Lucky loser
- Alt = Alternate
- ITF = ITF entry
- PR = Protected ranking
- SR = Special ranking
- SE = Special exempt
- JE = Junior exempt
- JR = Junior Accelerator Programme entrant
- CO = College Accelerator Programme entrant
- NG = Next Gen Accelerator Program entrant
- w/o = Walkover
- r = Retired
- d = Defaulted

=== Finals ===
Semifinals
1	(Portugal) Rui Machado	6	6
(France) Augustin Gensse	4	1
(France) Maxime Teixeira	6	6
2	(Czech Republic) Jan Hájek	4	2

Final
1	(Portugal) Rui Machado	6	6^{7}	6
(France) Maxime Teixeira	3	7	4

=== Top half ===
First round
1	(Portugal) R Machado	6	6
WC	(Morocco) T Ouahabi	1	1
(Romania) V Crivoi	6	6
(Czech Republic) D Lojda	3	3
Q	(Algeria) L Ouahab	2
(Spain) G Alcaide	3^{r}
LL	(Spain) Pablo Martin-Adalia	0	4
5	(Netherlands) J Huta Galung	6	6
3	(Spain) A Ramos	6	6
WC	(Egypt) M Safwat	4	3
(Australia) P Luczak	6	6
WC	(Morocco) Hicham Khaddari	2	4
(Russia) A Kuznetsov	3	3
(France) J Dasnières de Veigy	6	6
(France) A Gensse	6	6
7	(Argentina) F del Bonis	3	2

Second round
1	(Portugal) R Machado	6	6
(Romania) V Crivoi	4	3
Q	(Algeria) L Ouahab	3	4
5	(Netherlands) J Huta Galung	6	6
3	(Spain) A Ramos	6	6
(Australia) P Luczak	2	4
(France) J Dasnières de Veigy	2	6	3
(France) A Gensse	6	2	6

Quarterfinals
1	(Portugal) R Machado	3	6	7
5	(Netherlands) J Huta Galung	6	3	5
3	(Spain) A Ramos	7	4	4
(France) A Gensse	5	6	6

Semifinals
1	(Portugal) R Machado	6	6
(France) A Gensse	4	1

=== Bottom half ===
First round
8	(France) V Millot	6	6
(Slovakia) M Semjan	3	4
(Czech Republic) I Minář	6^{10}	6	7
Q	(Sweden) C Lindell	7	2	6^{2}
WC	(Morocco) A Fattar	6	3	5
(France) M Teixeira	3	6	7
(Kazakhstan) E Korolev	6	6
4	(Czech Republic) J Pospíšil	4	4
6	(Kazakhstan) Y Schukin	6	6
(Russia) I Belyaev	3	1
Q	(France) N Devilder	6	6
(Slovakia) I Klec	2	3
(Russia) E Donskoy	2	2
(Slovakia) M Kližan	6	6
Q	(Tunisia) M Jaziri	6	1	4
2	(Czech Republic) J Hájek	4	6	6

Second round
8	(France) V Millot	6^{2}	3
(Czech Republic) I Minář	7	6
(France) M Teixeira	6	6
(Kazakhstan) E Korolev	2	4
6	(Kazakhstan) Y Schukin	3	2
Q	(France) N Devilder	6	6
(Slovakia) M Kližan	3	4
2	(Czech Republic) J Hájek	6	6

Quarterfinals
(Czech Republic) I Minář	1	4
(France) M Teixeira	6	6
Q	(France) N Devilder	7	3	4
2	(Czech Republic) J Hájek	6^{1}	6	6

Semifinals
(France) M Teixeira	6	6
2	(Czech Republic) J Hájek	4	2
