= 2011 Morocco Tennis Tour – Marrakech – Doubles =

Marrakech – Doubles
- 2011 Morocco Tennis Tour – Marrakech

Final
- Champions: (Australia) Peter Luczak; (Italy) Alessandro Motti
- Runners-up: (United States) James Cerretani; (Canada) Adil Shamasdin
- Score: 7–6(5), 7–6(3)

Events
Singles	Doubles
- Morocco Tennis Tour – Marrakech

Ilija Bozoljac and Horia Tecău were the defending champions, but decided not to participate.
Peter Luczak and Alessandro Motti defeated James Cerretani and Adil Shamasdin 7–6(5), 7–6(3) in the final.

== Seeds ==
1. (United States) James Cerretani / (Canada) Adil Shamasdin (final)
2. (Germany) Frank Moser / (Czech Republic) David Škoch (quarterfinals)
3. (Australia) Jordan Kerr / (Germany) Michael Kohlmann (first round)
4. (Australia) Peter Luczak / (Italy) Alessandro Motti (champions)

== Draw ==
Key

- Q = Qualifier
- WC = Wild card
- LL = Lucky loser
- Alt = Alternate
- ITF = ITF entry
- PR = Protected ranking
- SR = Special ranking
- SE = Special exempt
- JE = Junior exempt
- JR = Junior Accelerator Programme entrant
- CO = College Accelerator Programme entrant
- NG = Next Gen Accelerator Program entrant
- w/o = Walkover
- r = Retired
- d = Defaulted

=== Draw ===
First round

Quarterfinals

Semifinals

Final

1
- (United States) J Cerretani
- (Canada) A Shamasdin
6
7

- (Netherlands) J Huta Galung
- (Portugal) R Machado
2
6^{7}

1
- (United States) J Cerretani
- (Canada) A Shamasdin
w/o

- (Spain) G Alcaide
- (Spain) A Ramos
6
6

- (Spain) G Alcaide
- (Spain) A Ramos

- (Romania) V Crivoi
- (Czech Republic) D Lojda
2
4

1
- (United States) J Cerretani
- (Canada) A Shamasdin
6
4
[10]

3
- (Australia) J Kerr
- (Germany) M Kohlmann
6^{1}
6
[8]

WC
- (Algeria) L Ouahab
- (Morocco) T Ouahabi
4
6
[5]

- (Slovakia) M Kližan
- (Czech Republic) J Pospíšil
7
3
[10]

- (Slovakia) M Kližan
- (Czech Republic) J Pospíšil
7
4
[14]

WC
- (Algeria) L Ouahab
- (Morocco) T Ouahabi
6
6

WC
- (Algeria) L Ouahab
- (Morocco) T Ouahabi
6^{1}
6
[16]

WC
(Morocco) Y Idmbarek
(Morocco) Othamane Lalami
1
4

1
- (United States) J Cerretani
- (Canada) A Shamasdin
6^{5}
6^{3}

- (Kazakhstan) E Korolev
- (Kazakhstan) Y Schukin
7
3
[14]

4
- (Australia) P Luczak
- (Italy) A Motti
7
7

- (Tunisia) M Jaziri
- (Spain) C Poch-Gradin
6^{6}
6
[12]

- (Kazakhstan) E Korolev
- (Kazakhstan) Y Schukin
1
0

WC
- (Morocco) A Fattar
- (Morocco) H Khaddari
2
4

4
- (Australia) P Luczak
- (Italy) A Motti
6
6

4
- (Australia) P Luczak
- (Italy) A Motti
6
6

4
- (Australia) P Luczak
- (Italy) A Motti
4
7
[10]

- (Slovakia) I Klec
- (Slovakia) M Semjan
6
4
[10]

- (Slovakia) I Klec
- (Slovakia) M Semjan
6
5
[7]

- (Russia) E Donskoy
- (Russia) A Kuznetsov
4
6
[6]

- (Slovakia) I Klec
- (Slovakia) M Semjan
6
4
[10]

- (France) A Gensse
- (France) V Millot
6^{5}
1

2
- (Germany) F Moser
- (Czech Republic) D Škoch
4
6
[6]

2
- (Germany) F Moser
- (Czech Republic) D Škoch
7
6
