= 2009 Morocco Tennis Tour – Marrakech – Doubles =

Tennis tournament

Marrakech – Doubles
- 2009 Morocco Tennis Tour – Marrakech

Final
- Champions: (Spain) Rubén Ramírez Hidalgo; (Spain) Santiago Ventura
- Runners-up: (Spain) Alberto Martín; (Spain) Daniel Muñoz de la Nava
- Score: 6–3, 7–6(5)

Events
| Singles | Doubles |
| ← 2008 · | Morocco Tennis Tour – Marrakech | · 2010 → |

Frederico Gil and Florin Mergea were the defending champions, however Gil chose to not participate this year.
Mergea partnered up with Denis Istomin, but they lost to Rubén Ramírez Hidalgo and Santiago Ventura in the semifinal.

== Seeds ==
1. (Uruguay) Pablo Cuevas / (Peru) Luis Horna (first round)
2. (Czech Republic) Jaroslav Levinský / (Croatia) Lovro Zovko (first round)
3. (Belgium) Dick Norman / (Netherlands) Rogier Wassen (quarterfinals)
4. (Germany) Michael Kohlmann / (Germany) Philipp Marx (quarterfinals)

== Draw ==
=== Key ===
- Q = Qualifier
- WC = Wild card
- LL = Lucky loser
- Alt = Alternate
- SE = Special exempt
- PR = Protected ranking
- ITF = ITF entry
- JE = Junior exempt
- w/o = Walkover
- r = Retired
- d = Defaulted
- SR = Special ranking

=== Draw ===
Quarterfinals

Semifinals

Final

- (Romania) H Tecău
- (Belgium) K Vliegen
5
6^{6}

- (Spain) P Andújar
- (Slovakia) D Hrbatý
7
7

- (Spain) P Andújar
- (Slovakia) D Hrbatý
5
2

- (Spain) A Martín
7
6

4
- (Germany) M Kohlmann
- (Germany) P Marx
5
4

- (Spain) A Martín
7
6

- (Spain) A Martín
3
6^{5}

- (Spain) R Ramírez Hidalgo
- (Spain) S Ventura
6
7

- (Uzbekistan) D Istomin
- (Romania) F Mergea
6
7

3
- (Belgium) D Norman
- (Netherlands) R Wassen
4
6^{3}

- (Uzbekistan) D Istomin
- (Romania) F Mergea
2
3

- (Spain) R Ramírez Hidalgo
- (Spain) S Ventura
6
6

- (Spain) R Ramírez Hidalgo
- (Spain) S Ventura
6
6

- (France) O Charroin
- (France) N Tourte
2
3
