= 2012 Morocco Tennis Tour – Marrakech – Singles =

Marrakech – Singles
- 2012 Morocco Tennis Tour – Marrakech

Final
- Champion: (Slovakia) Martin Kližan
- Runner-up: (Romania) Adrian Ungur
- Score: 3–6, 6–3, 6–0

Events
Singles	Doubles
- Morocco Tennis Tour – Marrakech

Rui Machado was the defending champion but decided not to participate.
Martin Kližan won the title, defeating Adrian Ungur 3–6, 6–3, 6–0 in the final.

== Seeds ==
1. (Spain) Pere Riba (first round)
2. (Romania) Victor Hănescu (semifinals)
3. (Romania) Adrian Ungur (final)
4. (Spain) Daniel Gimeno-Traver (first round)
5. (Slovenia) Blaž Kavčič (second round)
6. (Slovakia) Martin Kližan (champion)
7. (France) Stéphane Robert (first round)
8. (Italy) Alessandro Giannessi (second round)

== Draw ==
Key

- Q = Qualifier
- WC = Wild card
- LL = Lucky loser
- Alt = Alternate
- ITF = ITF entry
- PR = Protected ranking
- SR = Special ranking
- SE = Special exempt
- JE = Junior exempt
- JR = Junior Accelerator Programme entrant
- CO = College Accelerator Programme entrant
- NG = Next Gen Accelerator Program entrant
- w/o = Walkover
- r = Retired
- d = Defaulted

=== Finals ===
Semifinals
(Spain) Adrián Menéndez	2	2
3	(Romania) Adrian Ungur	6	6
6	(Slovakia) Martin Kližan	7	6
2	(Romania) Victor Hănescu	5	4

Final
3	(Romania) Adrian Ungur	6	3	0
6	(Slovakia) Martin Kližan	3	6	6

=== Top half ===
First round
1	(Spain) P Riba	4	4
(Spain) A Menéndez	6	6
(France) M Gicquel	7^{8}	3	6^{9}
(Russia) A Kuznetsov	6^{6}	6	7^{11}
(Spain) I Cervantes Huegun	1	4
WC	(France) P-H Mathieu	6	6
(Germany) S Greul	3	3
8	(Italy) A Giannessi	6	6
3	(Romania) A Ungur	7	6
WC	(Morocco) Y Idmbarek	5	0
(Spain) D Muñoz-de la Nava	3	6	4
Q	(Slovakia) N Gombos	6	4	6
Q	(Romania) V Crivoi	5	7^{13}	1
Q	(Germany) B Knittel	7	6^{11}	0r
(Portugal) J Sousa	2	1
5	(Slovenia) B Kavčič	6	6

Second round
(Spain) A Menéndez	3	6	6
(Russia) A Kuznetsov	6	2	3
WC	(France) P-H Mathieu	6	7^{7}
8	(Italy) A Giannessi	3	6^{3}
3	(Romania) A Ungur	2	6	6
Q	(Slovakia) N Gombos	6	1	4
Q	(Romania) V Crivoi	1	6	6
5	(Slovenia) B Kavčič	6	2	4

Quarterfinals
(Spain) A Menéndez	2	7	6
WC	(France) P-H Mathieu	6	5	4
3	(Romania) A Ungur	6	1	6
Q	(Romania) V Crivoi	4	6	3

Semifinals
(Spain) A Menéndez	2	2
3	(Romania) A Ungur	6	6

=== Bottom half ===
First round
6	(Slovakia) M Kližan	6	6
WC	(Morocco) A Fattar	4	1
WC	(Morocco) M Ziadi	4	1
(Spain) J Martí	6	6
(Russia) E Donskoy	6	6
(France) M Teixeira	2	2
(Argentina) F Delbonis	2	7	6
4	(Spain) D Gimeno-Traver	6	5	3
7	(France) S Robert	3	5
(Australia) J Duckworth	6	7
(Spain) P Carreño-Busta	4	6	6
(Slovenia) A Bedene	6	4	3
(France) J Dasnières de Veigy	2	2
(France) A Gensse	6	6
Q	(Russia) N Basilashvili	6^{6}	3
2	(Romania) V Hănescu	7^{8}	6

Second round
6	(Slovakia) M Kližan	6	6
(Spain) J Martí	1	0
(Russia) E Donskoy	6	3	3
(Argentina) F Delbonis	4	6	6
(Australia) J Duckworth	6	1	6^{4}
(Spain) P Carreño-Busta	3	6	7^{7}
(France) A Gensse	4	4
2	(Romania) V Hănescu	6	6

Quarterfinals
6	(Slovakia) M Kližan	6	7^{8}
(Argentina) F Delbonis	4	6^{6}
(Spain) P Carreño-Busta	4	6^{4}
2	(Romania) V Hănescu	6	7^{7}

Semifinals
6	(Slovakia) M Kližan	7	6
2	(Romania) V Hănescu	5	4
