= 2009 Morocco Tennis Tour – Marrakech – Singles =

Marrakech – Singles
- 2009 Morocco Tennis Tour – Marrakech

Final
- Champion: (Brazil) Marcos Daniel
- Runner-up: (Algeria) Lamine Ouahab
- Score: 4–6, 7–5, 6–2

Events
Singles	Doubles
← 2008 ·	Morocco Tennis Tour – Marrakech	· 2010 →

Gaël Monfils was the defending champion.

== Seeds ==
1. (Spain) Daniel Gimeno-Traver (first round)
2. (Spain) Alberto Martín (first round)
3. (Spain) Pablo Andújar (quarterfinals)
4. (Belgium) Kristof Vliegen (second round)
5. (Czech Republic) Ivo Minář (semifinals)
6. (Uzbekistan) Denis Istomin (first round)
7. (Czech Republic) Jiří Vaněk (first round)
8. (Brazil) Marcos Daniel (champion)

== Draw ==
=== Key ===
- Q = Qualifier
- WC = Wild card
- LL = Lucky loser
- Alt = Alternate
- ITF = ITF entry
- PR = Protected ranking
- SR = Special ranking
- SE = Special exempt
- JE = Junior exempt
- JR = Junior Accelerator Programme entrant
- CO = College Accelerator Programme entrant
- NG = Next Gen Accelerator Program entrant
- w/o = Walkover
- r = Retired
- d = Defaulted

=== Final four ===
Semifinals
(Algeria) Lamine Ouahab	6	6
5	(Czech Republic) Ivo Minář	2	3
(France) Alexandre Sidorenko	1	0^{r}
8	(Brazil) Marcos Daniel	6	0

Final
(Algeria) Lamine Ouahab	6	5	2
8	(Brazil) Marcos Daniel	4	7	6

=== Top half ===
First round
1	(Spain) D Gimeno-Traver	3	4
Q	(Belgium) D Norman	6	6
(Algeria) L Ouahab	6	6
Q	(Spain) A Menéndez-Maceiras	2	4
(France) L Recouderc	6	6
(Czech Republic) J Pospíšil	3	1
(Portugal) R Machado	6	2
7	(Czech Republic) J Vaněk	3	0^{r}
3	(Spain) P Andújar	6	7
(Serbia) B Pašanski	2	6^{2}
(Spain) C Poch-Gradin	2	6	6^{3}
(Spain) P Riba	6	4	7
Q	(Tunisia) M Jaziri	6^{6}	6	5
(Peru) L Horna	7	3	7
(Spain) R Ramírez Hidalgo	3	2
5	(Czech Republic) I Minář	6	6

Second round
Q	(Belgium) D Norman	6^{4}	4
(Algeria) L Ouahab	7	6
(France) L Recouderc	2	3
(Portugal) R Machado	6	6
3	(Spain) P Andújar	6	6
(Spain) P Riba	4	4
(Peru) L Horna	1	2
5	(Czech Republic) I Minář	6	6

Quarterfinals
(Algeria) L Ouahab	6	7
(Portugal) R Machado	2	6^{2}
3	(Spain) P Andújar	2	3
5	(Czech Republic) I Minář	6	6

Semifinals
(Algeria) L Ouahab	6	6
5	(Czech Republic) I Minář	2	3

=== Bottom half ===
First round
6	(Uzbekistan) D Istomin	6^{3}	6	4
(France) A Sidorenko	7	4	6
WC	(Egypt) S Sabry	6	3	5
(Spain) MÁ López Jaén	1	6	7
(Monaco) J-R Lisnard	4	5
WC	(Morocco) R Chaki	6	7
Q	(Czech Republic) J Hájek	3	0^{r}
4	(Belgium) K Vliegen	6	0
8	(Brazil) M Daniel	3	6	6
(Slovakia) D Hrbatý	6	4	2
WC	(Morocco) M Ziadi	6	4	6
WC	(Morocco) R El Amrani	2	6	2
(Uruguay) P Cuevas	4	3
(Spain) D Muñoz-De La Nava	6	6
(Spain) S Ventura	6	7
2	(Spain) A Martín	4	5

Second round
(France) A Sidorenko	6^{5}	7	6
(Spain) MÁ López Jaén	7	6^{2}	3
WC	(Morocco) R Chaki	6	6
4	(Belgium) K Vliegen	4	3
8	(Brazil) M Daniel	6	6
WC	(Morocco) M Ziadi	3	2
(Spain) D Muñoz-De La Nava	6^{7}	6^{8}
(Spain) S Ventura	7	7

Quarterfinals
(France) A Sidorenko	6	7
WC	(Morocco) R Chaki	4	6^{0}
8	(Brazil) M Daniel	6	6
(Spain) S Ventura	4	2

Semifinals
(France) A Sidorenko	1	0^{r}
8	(Brazil) M Daniel	6	0
