= 2010 Morocco Tennis Tour – Marrakech – Singles =

Marrakech – Singles
- 2010 Morocco Tennis Tour – Marrakech

Final
- Champion: (Finland) Jarkko Nieminen
- Runner-up: (Ukraine) Oleksandr Dolgopolov Jr.
- Score: 6–3, 6–2

Events
Singles	Doubles
- Morocco Tennis Tour – Marrakech

Marcos Daniel was the defending champion, however he didn't take part in these championships this year.
Jarkko Nieminen won in the final 6–3, 6–2, against Oleksandr Dolgopolov Jr.

== Seeds ==
1. (Ukraine) Oleksandr Dolgopolov Jr. (final)
2. (Finland) Jarkko Nieminen (champion)
3. (Belgium) Steve Darcis (second round)
4. (Slovenia) Blaž Kavčič (second round)
5. (Russia) Teymuraz Gabashvili (second round)
6. (Spain) Marcel Granollers (semifinals)
7. (Romania) Victor Crivoi (second round)
8. (Italy) Simone Bolelli (second round)

== Draw ==
Key

- Q = Qualifier
- WC = Wild card
- LL = Lucky loser
- Alt = Alternate
- ITF = ITF entry
- PR = Protected ranking
- SR = Special ranking
- SE = Special exempt
- JE = Junior exempt
- JR = Junior Accelerator Programme entrant
- CO = College Accelerator Programme entrant
- NG = Next Gen Accelerator Program entrant
- w/o = Walkover
- r = Retired
- d = Defaulted

=== Finals ===
Semifinals
1	(Ukraine) Oleksandr Dolgopolov Jr.	6	5	7
(Kazakhstan) Mikhail Kukushkin	4	7	5
6	(Spain) Marcel Granollers	5	7	5
2	(Finland) Jarkko Nieminen	7	6^{3}	7

Final
1	(Ukraine) Oleksandr Dolgopolov Jr.	3	2
2	(Finland) Jarkko Nieminen	6	6

=== Top half ===
First round
1	(Ukraine) O Dolgopolov Jr.	7	6
Q	(Belgium) D Goffin	5	3
Q	(Italy) A Arnaboldi	2	6	6
(Romania) A Ungur	6	2	4
(Serbia) I Bozoljac	6	7
(Argentina) M Vassallo Argüello	2	6^{3}
(Kazakhstan) Y Schukin	6	2	4
5	(Russia) T Gabashvili	2	6	6
3	(Belgium) S Darcis	6	6
(Italy) M Crugnola	1	4
(France) A Sidorenko	1	2
(Kazakhstan) M Kukushkin	6	6
(France) L Recouderc	4	6	7
(Germany) D Meffert	6	3	6^{7}
WC	(Tunisia) M Jaziri	4	2
8	(Italy) S Bolelli	6	6

Second round
1	(Ukraine) O Dolgopolov Jr.	6	6
Q	(Italy) A Arnaboldi	4	2
(Serbia) I Bozoljac	4	7	6
5	(Russia) T Gabashvili	6	5	2
3	(Belgium) S Darcis	4	6	4
(Kazakhstan) M Kukushkin	6	4	6
(France) L Recouderc	6	6
8	(Italy) S Bolelli	3	2

Quarterfinals
1	(Ukraine) O Dolgopolov Jr.	7	6
(Serbia) I Bozoljac	6^{4}	3
(Kazakhstan) M Kukushkin	7	4
(France) L Recouderc	6^{1}	5	r

Semifinals
1	(Ukraine) O Dolgopolov Jr.	6	5	7
(Kazakhstan) M Kukushkin	4	7	5

=== Bottom half ===
First round
6	(Spain) M Granollers	6	6
(Spain) A Martín	2	2
(Spain) P Andújar	6	7
WC	(Morocco) R El Amrani	3	5
(Italy) F Cipolla	6	6
WC	(Morocco) M Ziadi	2	3
Q	(Spain) S Gutiérrez Ferrol	1	3
4	(Slovenia) B Kavčič	6	6
7	(Romania) V Crivoi	7	7
Q	(Germany) D Gremelmayr	5	6^{7}
WC	(Morocco) R Chaki	6^{4}	0
(Algeria) L Ouahab	7	6
(Ukraine) I Sergeyev	6	7
SE	(Germany) B Knittel	0	6^{3}
(France) T Ascione	4	6	5
2	(Finland) J Nieminen	6	3	7

Second round
6	(Spain) M Granollers	6	7
(Spain) P Andújar	0	6^{5}
(Italy) F Cipolla	6	6
4	(Slovenia) B Kavčič	4	3
7	(Romania) V Crivoi	6	4	2
(Algeria) L Ouahab	3	6	6
(Ukraine) I Sergeyev	3	0	r
2	(Finland) J Nieminen	6	1

Quarterfinals
6	(Spain) M Granollers	6	6
(Italy) F Cipolla	1	2
(Algeria) L Ouahab	1	2
2	(Finland) J Nieminen	6	6

Semifinals
6	(Spain) M Granollers	5	7	5
2	(Finland) J Nieminen	7	6^{3}	7
