= 2012 Morocco Tennis Tour – Marrakech =

Tennis tournament

- Date: 19–25 March
- Edition: 6th
- Location: Marrakesh, Morocco

Champions

Singles
- (Slovakia) Martin Kližan

Doubles
- (Slovakia) Martin Kližan / (Spain) Daniel Muñoz de la Nava
- Morocco Tennis Tour – Marrakech

The 2012 Morocco Tennis Tour – Marrakech was a professional tennis tournament played on hard courts. It was the sixth edition of the tournament which was part of the 2012 ATP Challenger Tour. It took place in Marrakesh, Morocco between 19 and 25 March 2012.

== Singles main-draw entrants ==
=== Seeds ===
Country	Player	Rank^{1}	Seed
ESP	Pere Riba	89	1
ROU	Victor Hănescu	90	2
ROU	Adrian Ungur	98	3
ESP	Daniel Gimeno Traver	101	4
SVN	Blaž Kavčič	106	5
SVK	Martin Kližan	118	6
FRA	Stéphane Robert	122	7
ITA	Alessandro Giannessi	136	8

- ^{1} Rankings are as of March 12, 2012.

=== Other entrants ===
The following players received wildcards into the singles main draw:

- (Morocco) Anas Fattar
- (Morocco) Yassine Idmbarek
- (France) Paul-Henri Mathieu
- (Morocco) Mehdi Ziadi

The following players received entry from the qualifying draw:

- (Russia) Nikoloz Basilashvili
- (Romania) Victor Crivoi
- (Slovakia) Norbert Gombos
- (Germany) Bastian Knittel

== Champions ==
=== Singles ===
- (Slovakia) Martin Kližan def. (Romania) Adrian Ungur, 3–6, 6–3, 6–0

=== Doubles ===
- (Slovakia) Martin Kližan / (Spain) Daniel Muñoz de la Nava def. (Spain) Íñigo Cervantes Huegun / (Argentina) Federico Delbonis, 6–3, 1–6, [12–10]
