= Tabarka Rocks =

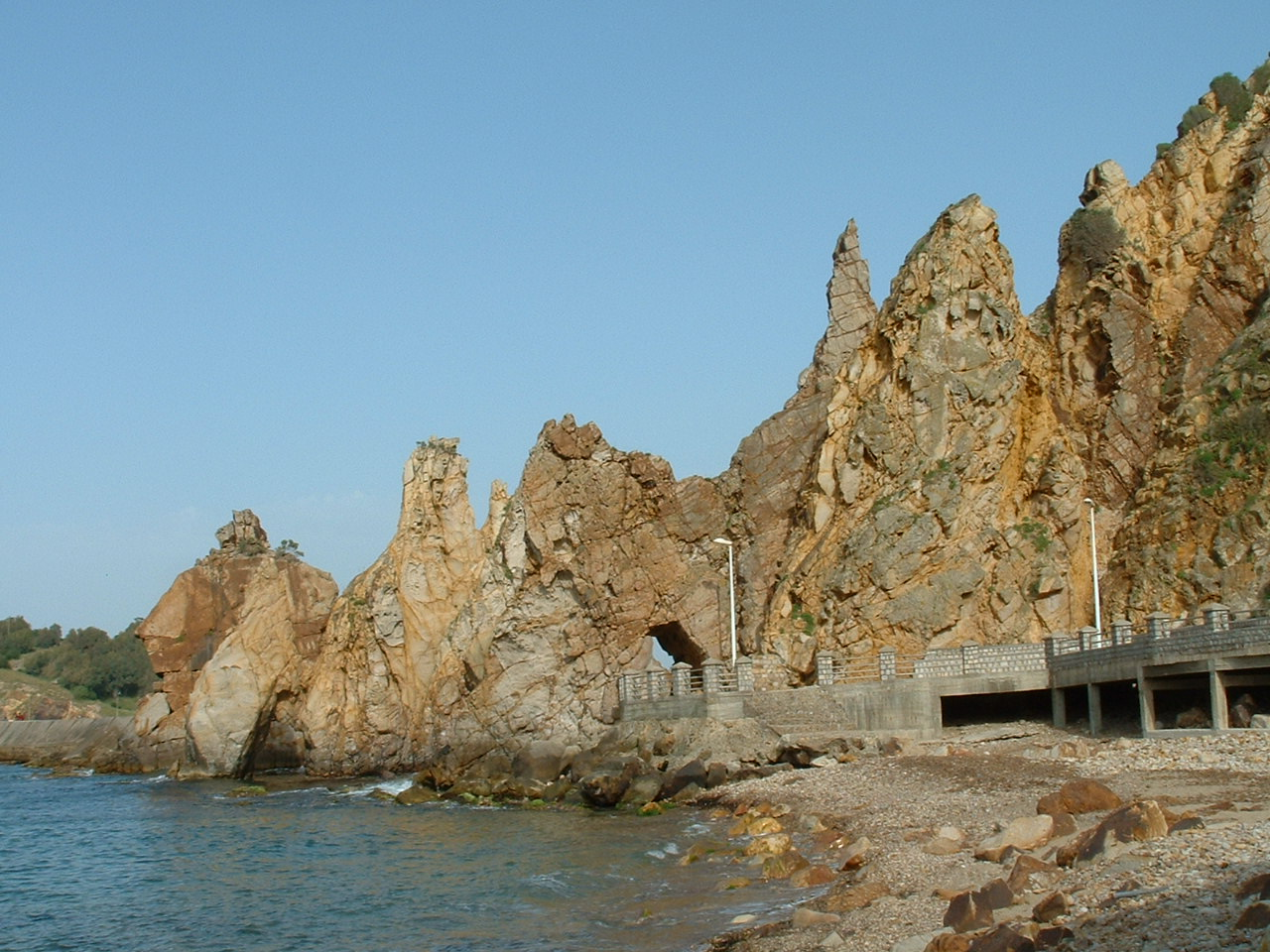
- Tabarka Rocks

Highest point
- Coordinates: 36.96°N 8.753056°E

Geography
- Location within Tunisia
- Location: Tabarka, Tunisia

The Tabarka Rocks are a rock formation on the northwestern coast of Tunisia, on the coast of the Mediterranean Sea, to the west of the city of Tabarka. The "needle-shaped" rock formations caused by erosion have created a series of towering crags along the coast of the sea.
