= Tabarka Jazz Festival =

Annual festival in Tabarka, Tunisia

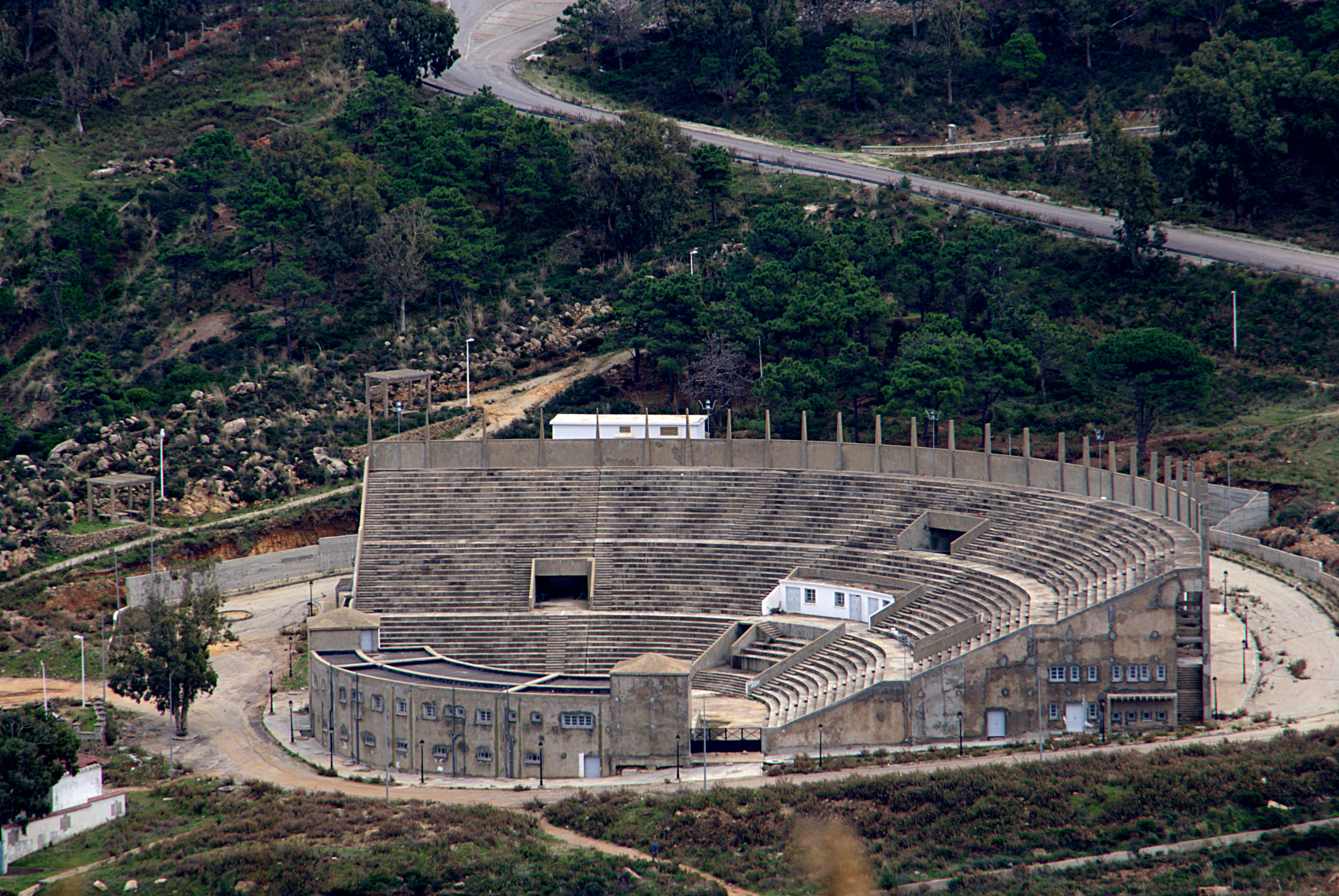
Theatre of Tabarka

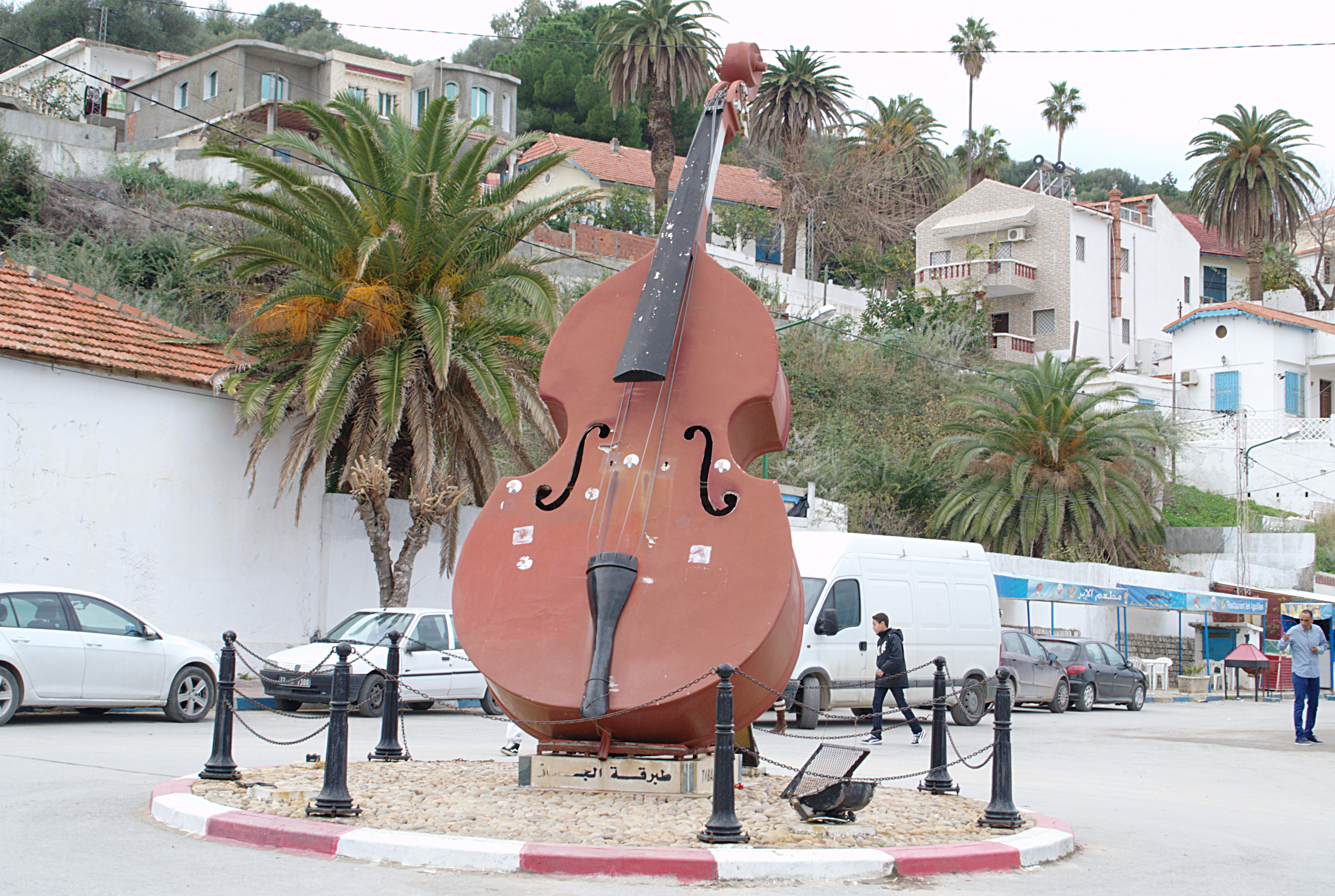

The Tabarka Jazz Festival (Arabic: مهرجان طبرقة للجاز) is an annual festival of jazz held in the coastal town of Tabarka in Tunisia. Established in 1973 for four years, it was revived again in 1997. The Tabarka Jazz Festival is held annually in July at the Basilica of Tabarka. Artists who have appeared over the years include Al Jarreau, Billy Paul, Barbara Hendricks, Kool & The Gang, Lucky Peterson, Bernard Allison, Diana Krall, Miles Davis, Natural Acoustic Band (Manu Dibango, Léo Ferré, Dizzy Gillespie, Johnny Van Dyke, Randy Weston, Keith Jarrett, Michel Jonasz, Miriam Makeba, Charles Mingus, Claude Nougaro, Ahmad Jamal, The Temptations and Al Di Meola.Natural Acoustic Band (Tom Hoy & Robin Thyne)
