= 2011 Morocco Tennis Tour – Marrakech =

- Date: 21–27 March
- Edition: 5th
- Location: Marrakesh, Morocco

Champions

Singles
- (Portugal) Rui Machado

Doubles
- (Australia) Peter Luczak / (Italy) Alessandro Motti
- Morocco Tennis Tour – Marrakech

The 2011 Morocco Tennis Tour – Marrakech was a professional tennis tournament played on clay courts. It was the fifth edition of the tournament which is part of the 2011 ATP Challenger Tour. It took place in Marrakesh, Morocco between 21 and 27 March 2011.

== ATP entrants ==
=== Seeds ===
Country	Player	Rank^{1}	Seed
POR	Rui Machado	94	1
CZE	Jan Hájek	98	2
ESP	Albert Ramos	110	3
CZE	Jaroslav Pospíšil	111	4
NED	Jesse Huta Galung	113	5
KAZ	Yuri Schukin	125	6
ARG	Federico Delbonis	140	7
FRA	Vincent Millot	151	8

- Rankings are as of March 7, 2011.

=== Other entrants ===
The following players received wildcards into the singles main draw:

- (Morocco) Anas Fattar
- (Morocco) Hicham Khaddari
- (Morocco) Talal Ouahabi
- (Egypt) Mohamed Safwat

The following players received entry from the qualifying draw:

- (France) Nicolas Devilder
- (Tunisia) Malek Jaziri
- (Sweden) Christian Lindell
- (Algeria) Lamine Ouahab

== Champions ==
=== Singles ===
(Portugal) Rui Machado def. (France) Maxime Teixeira, 6–3, 6–7(7), 6–4

=== Doubles ===
(Australia) Peter Luczak / (Italy) Alessandro Motti def. (United States) James Cerretani / (Canada) Adil Shamasdin, 7–6(5), 7–6(3)
