= 2009 Morocco Tennis Tour – Marrakech =

- Date: March 16 – March 22
- Edition: 3rd
- Location: Marrakesh, Morocco

Champions

Singles
- (Brazil) Marcos Daniel

Doubles
- (Spain) Rubén Ramírez Hidalgo / (Spain) Santiago Ventura
- Morocco Tennis Tour – Marrakech

The 2009 Morocco Tennis Tour – Marrakech was a professional tennis tournament played on outdoor red clay courts. It was part of the 2009 ATP Challenger Tour. It took place in Marrakesh, Morocco between 16 and 22 March 2009.

== Singles entrants ==
=== Seeds ===
Nationality	Player	Ranking*	Seeding
ESP	Daniel Gimeno Traver	78	1
ESP	Alberto Martín	80	2
ESP	Pablo Andújar	89	3
BEL	Kristof Vliegen	99	4
CZE	Ivo Minář	101	5
UZB	Denis Istomin	102	6
CZE	Jiří Vaněk	113	7
BRA	Marcos Daniel	114	8

- Rankings are as of March 9, 2009.

=== Other entrants ===
The following players received wildcards into the singles main draw:

- (Morocco) Rabie Chaki
- (Morocco) Reda El Amrani
- (Egypt) Sherif Sabry
- (Morocco) Mehdi Ziadi

The following players received entry from the qualifying draw:

- (Czech Republic) Jan Hájek
- (Tunisia) Malek Jaziri
- (Spain) Adrián Menéndez Maceiras
- (Belgium) Dick Norman

== Champions ==
=== Men's singles ===
(Brazil) Marcos Daniel def. (Algeria) Lamine Ouahab, 4–6, 7–5, 6–2

=== Men's doubles ===
(Spain) Rubén Ramírez Hidalgo / (Spain) Santiago Ventura def. (Spain) Alberto Martín / (Spain) Daniel Muñoz de la Nava, 6–3, 7–6(5)
