= Tabarka =

Tabarka طبرقة
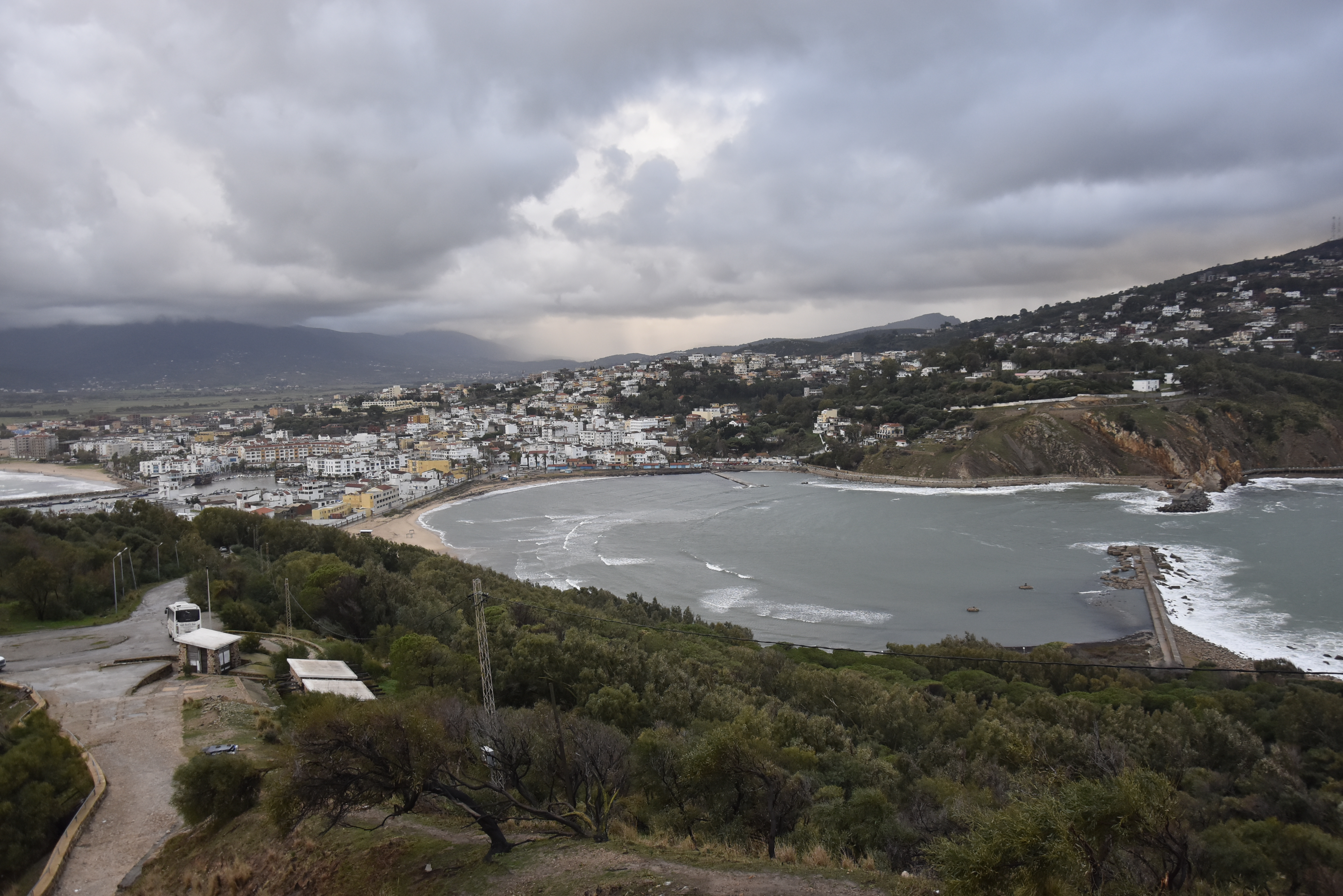
- From top to bottom, left to right: The Genoese Fort of Tabarka,Tabarka Golf Course, Tabarka Forest

- Location in Tunisia
- Coordinates: 36°57′16″N 8°45′29″E
- Country: Tunisia
- Governorate: Jendouba Governorate
- Elevation: 15 ft (4.7 m)

Population (2022)
  - Total: 22,119
  - Density: 10,090/sq mi (3,894/km^{2})
- Time zone: UTC1 (CET)
- Postal Code: 8110

Tabarka (Arabic: طبرقة Ṭbarqa) is a coastal town located in north-western Tunisia in the Jendouba Governorate, close to the border with Algeria. Tabarka was occupied at various times by Punics, Greeks, Romans, Arabs, Genoese and Ottomans. The town is dominated by an offshore rock on which there remains a Genoese castle. Nationalist leader Habib Bourguiba, later president of post-independence Tunisia, was exiled on Tabarka by the French colonial authorities in 1952. Tourist attractions include coral fishing, the Coralis Festival of underwater photography, and its annual jazz festival.

== Name ==
Tabarka was known to the Carthaginians as tbrkʿn (Punic: 𐤕𐤁𐤓𐤊𐤏𐤍). This was transcribed into Greek as Thaúbraka (Θαύβρακα) and into Latin as Thabraca. In modern day Berber it is known as Tabarka or Tbarga, while its Arabic name is Ṭbarqa (طبرقة).

== History ==
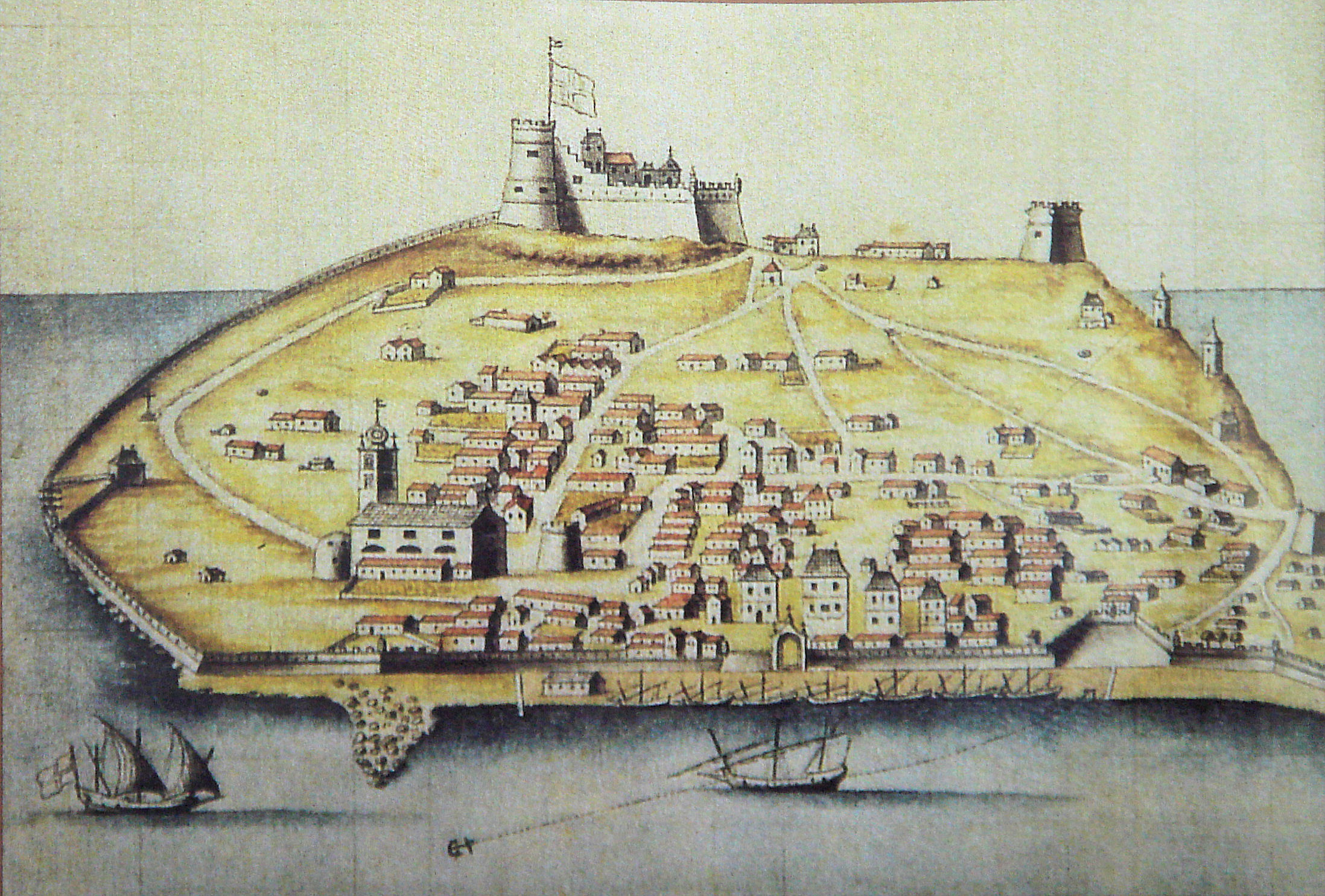
Tarbarka island, 17th century. Note the Genoese flag on the castle.

Although older sources placed Thabraca within the Roman province of Numidia, recent ones agree on placing it in the Roman province of Africa, known also as Africa Proconsularis. It was a Roman colony. It was connected by a road with Simitthu, which it served as a port for the export of its famous marble. The rebellious Roman official Gildo, the brother of Firmus, committed suicide in Thabraca. Under the Vandal king Gaiseric, the town had a monastery for men and a convent for women.

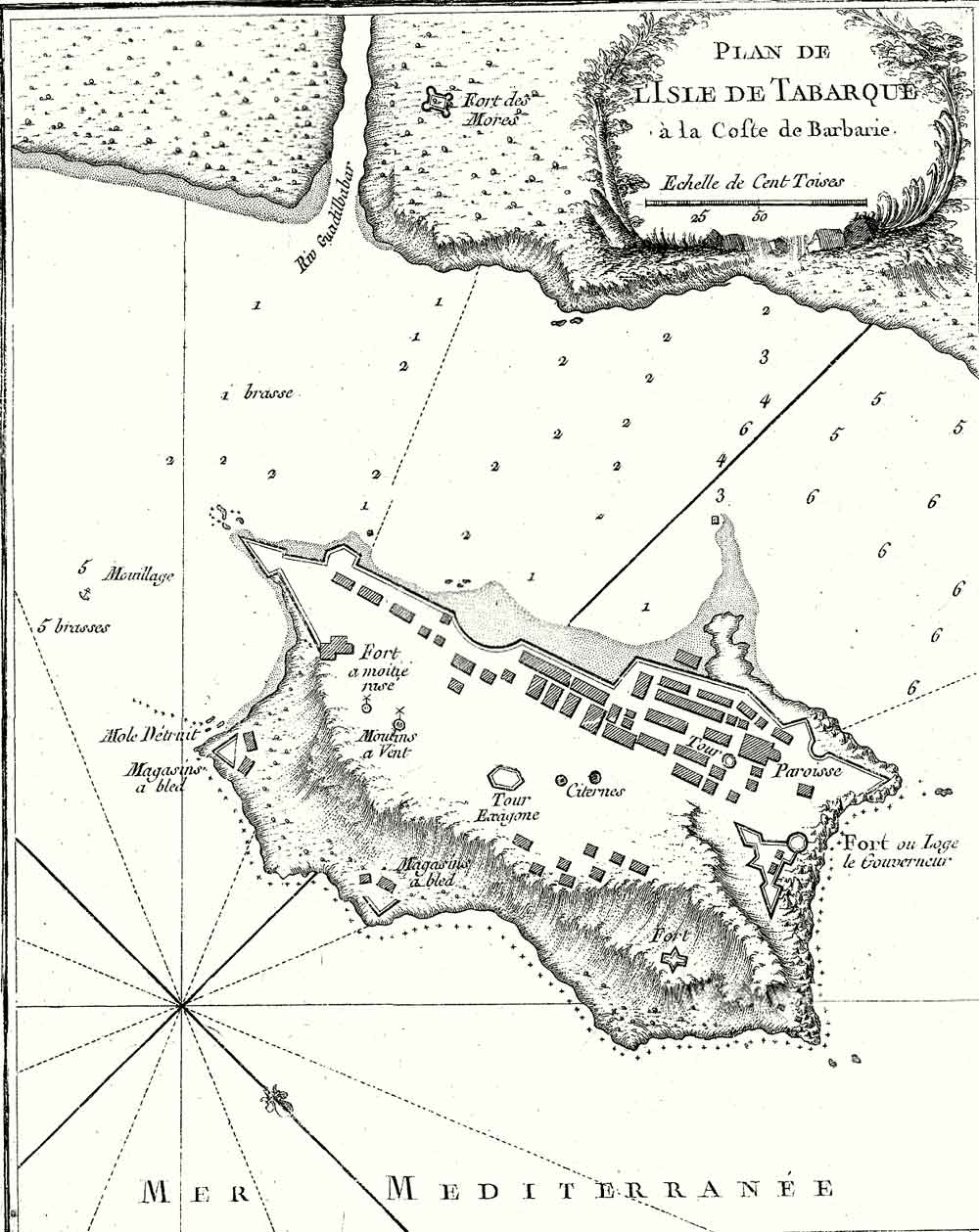
Fort diagram

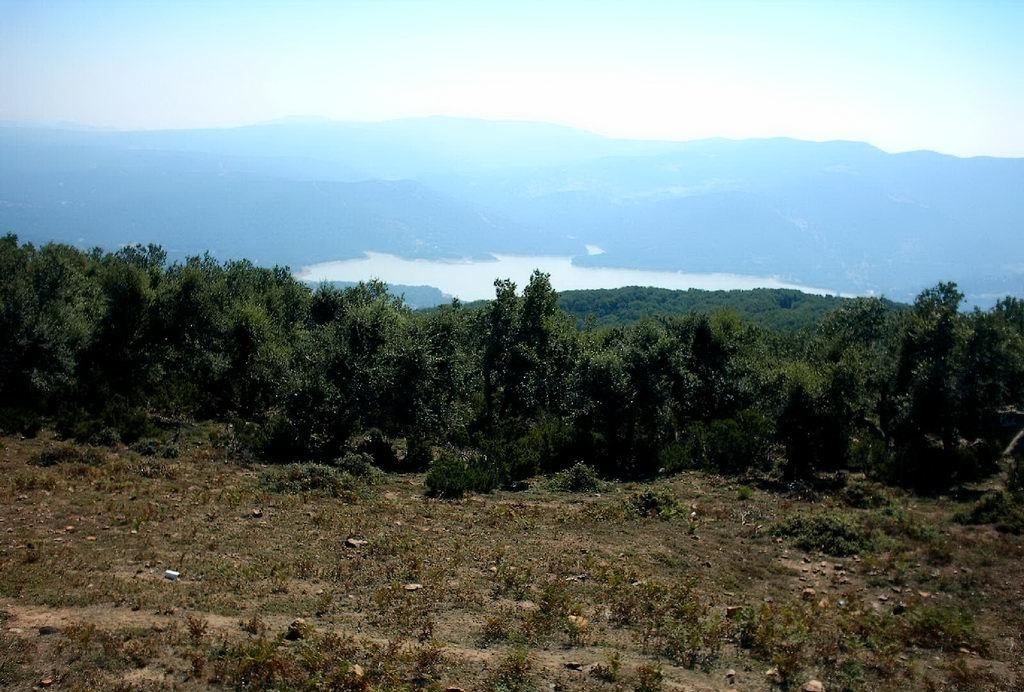

From 1540 to 1742, the Genoese maintained a garrison on the adjacent island, also called Tabarka, which lies about 365 yards (334 m) off the town. In 1540 the island was given by the Ottoman Bey of Tunis as a concession to the Genoese Lomellini family. The Genoese were in the service of Spain during 1553 at the request of Emperor Charles V who was interested in coral fishing. The Lomellini were part of the circle of Andrea Doria, Doge of Genoa, and were related to the Grimaldi family. The grant was possibly due to a secret ransom for the release of the pirate Turkish Dragut, captured in Girolata in 1540 by Giannettino Doria, nephew of Andrea Doria. The Lomellini colonized Tabarca with a group of inhabitants of Pegli, near Genoa, where they had various properties and a huge palace. The community of Pegliesi lived in Tabarka for several centuries.

In 1738 due to the exhaustion of the coral reefs and the deterioration of relations with the Arab population a large group of "Tabarkini" moved to San Pietro Island off Sardinia, then uninhabited, where they founded a new town of Carloforte. The transfer was made possible thanks to the King of Sardinia, Charles Emmanuel III of Sardinia who wanted to colonize those of his lands which were not yet inhabited. The name of Carloforte was chosen in honor of the sovereign. Another group of Tabarkini was resettled in the town of Calasetta on the adjacent Island of Sant'Antioco, whose population still speaks a variant of Genoese dialect originating from Tabarka. Others were moved to the Spanish island of New Tabarca. In 1741 or 1742, the Genoese fortress surrendered to the (nominally Ottoman but essentially autonomous) Bey of Tunis. At Tabarka, the ruins consists of a pit once used as a church and some fragments of walls which belonged to Christian buildings. There were also two Ottoman Turkish fortresses, one of which has been repaired. A French expedition was dispatched to capture Tabarka but failed.

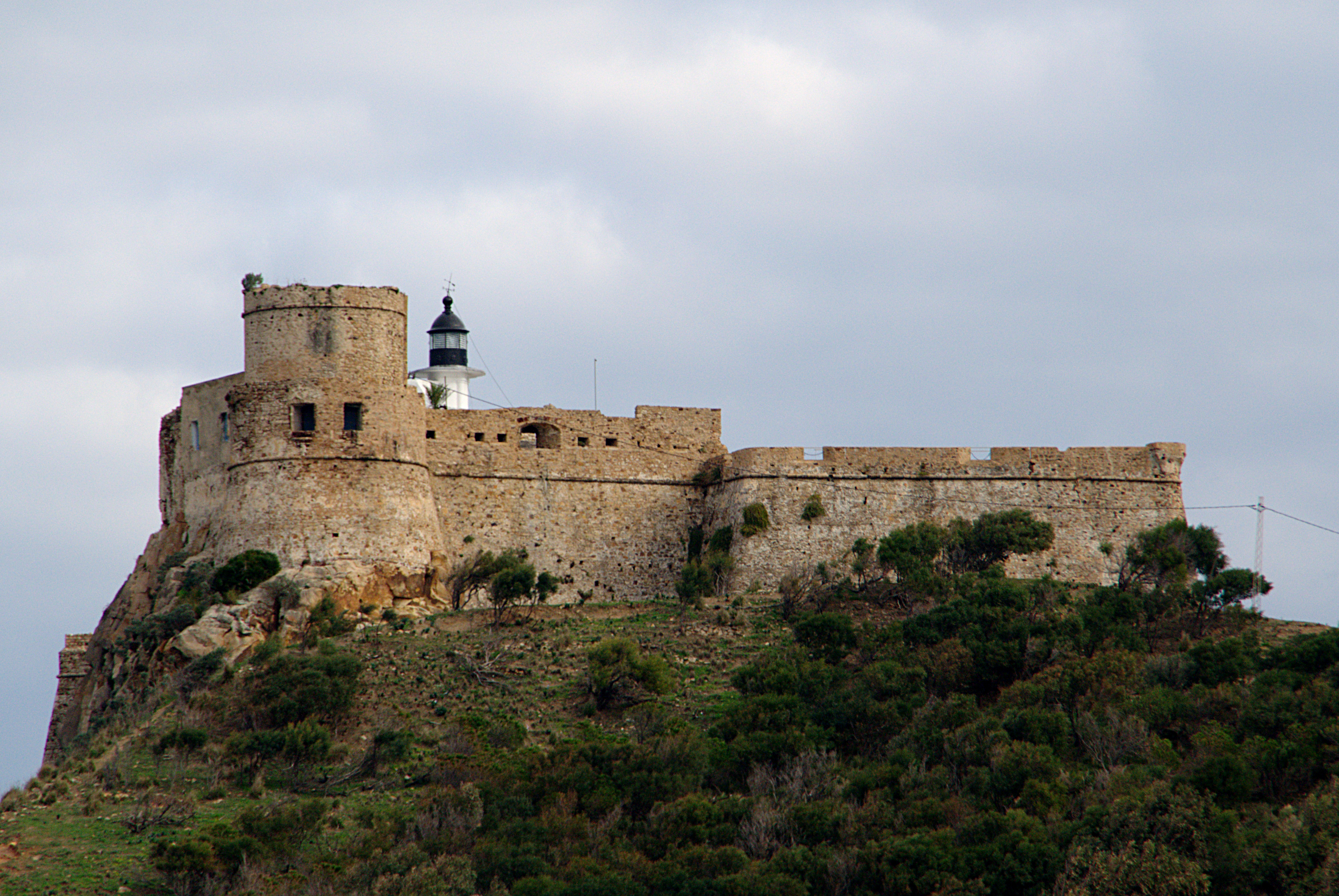
Close view

Under French colonial rule it was annexed to the civil district of Souk el-Arba, now in the Tunisian governorate of Jendouba, and a rather important fishing centre. Tabarka Jazz Festival was established in 1973.

== Ecclesiastical history ==
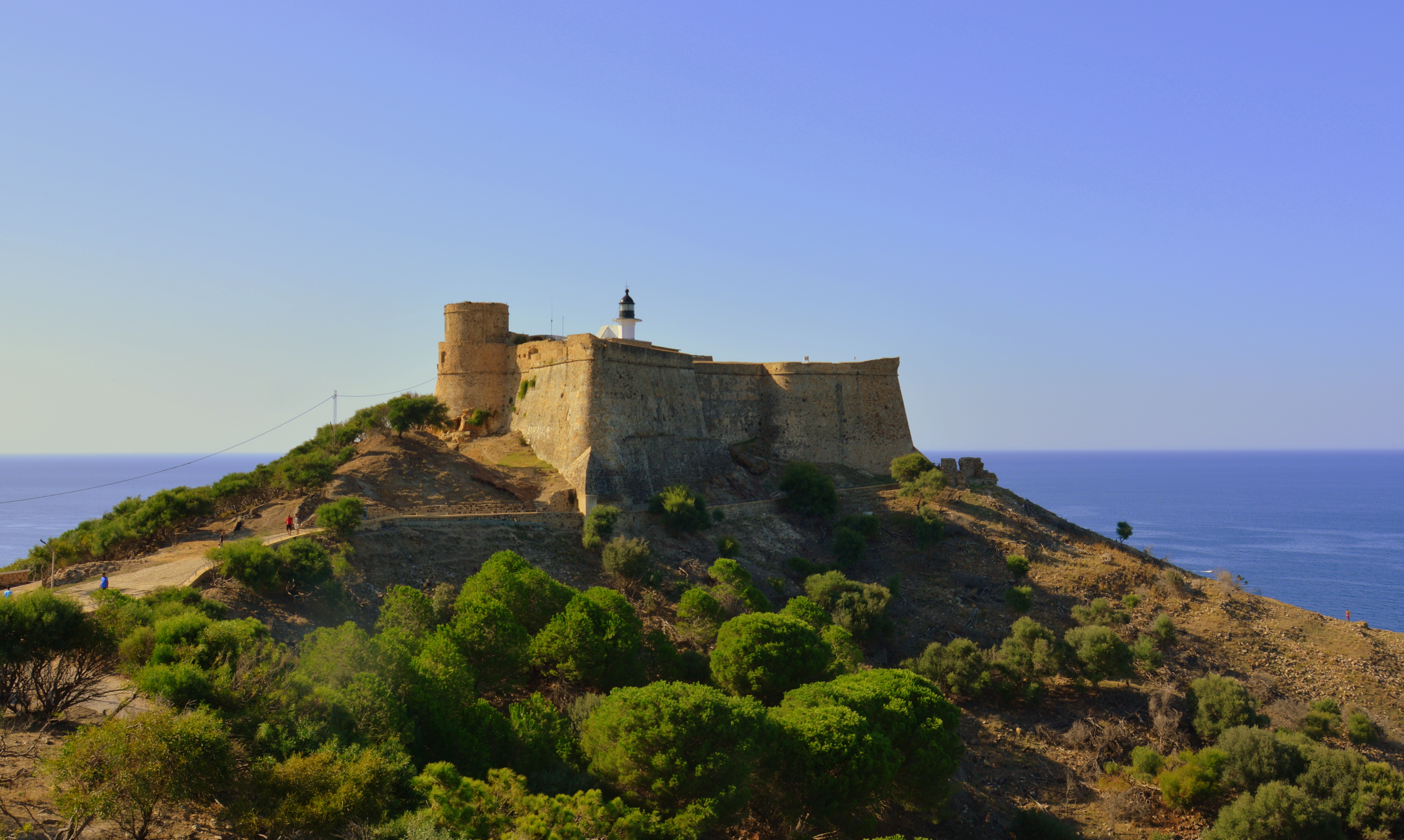
Tabarka Fort

Thabraca became a Christian bishopric that is no longer a residential see but is included in the Catholic Church's list of titular sees.

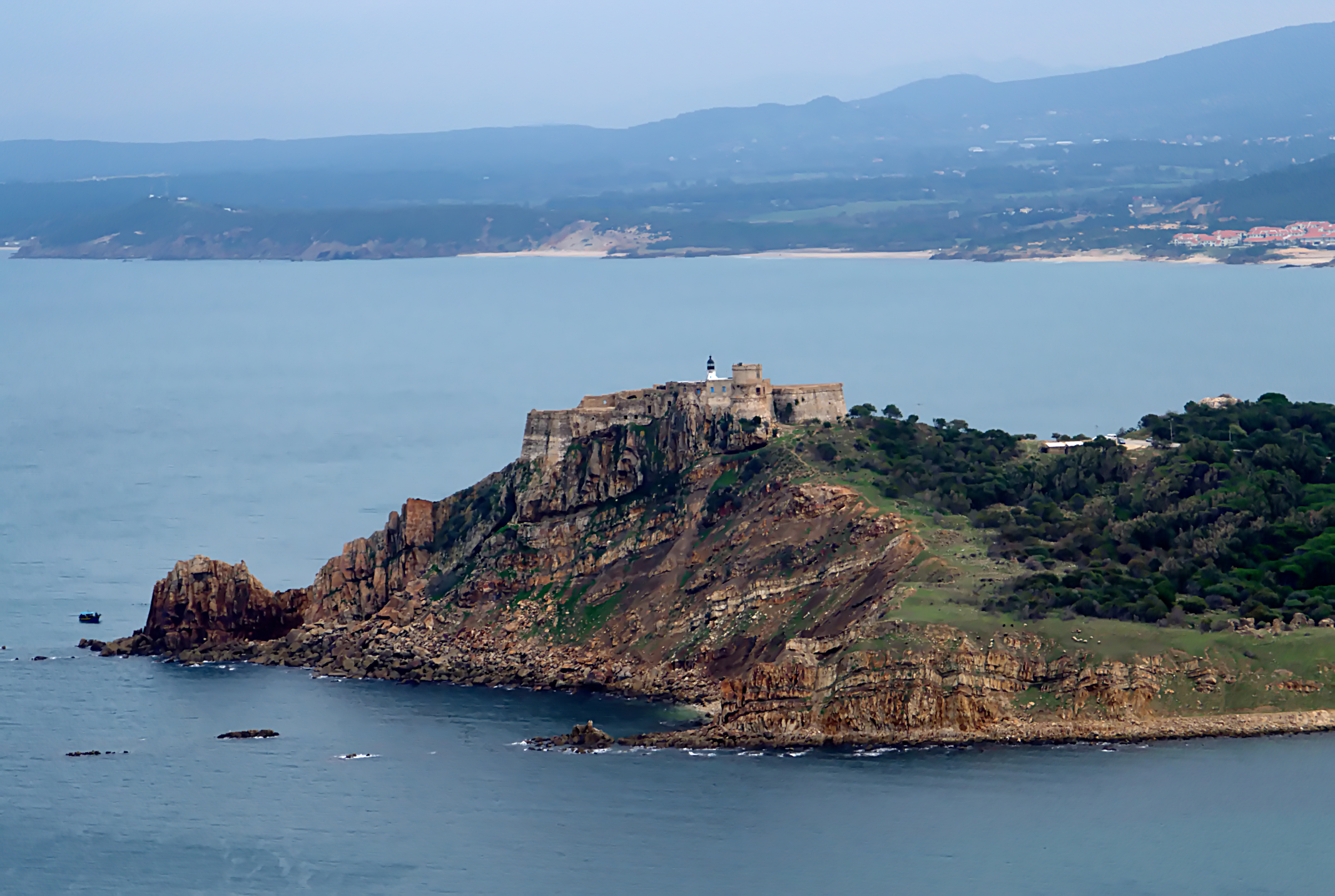
View of Tabarka's fort

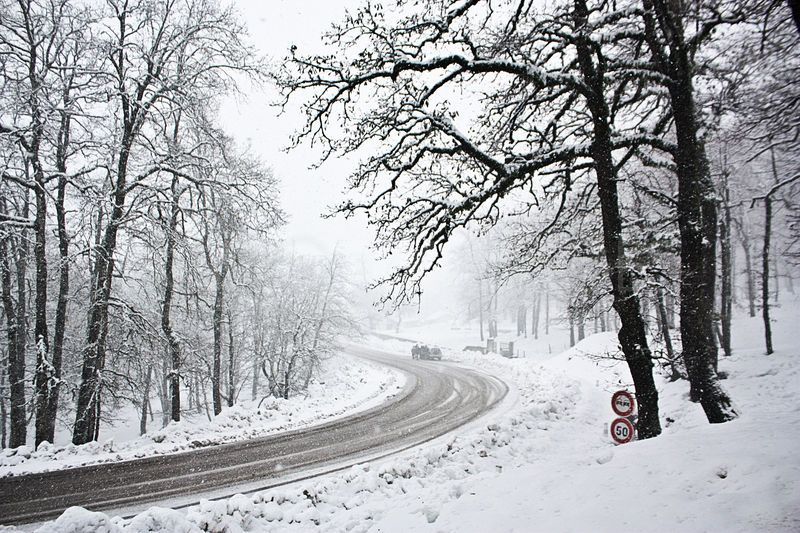
Snow in Tabarka's forest

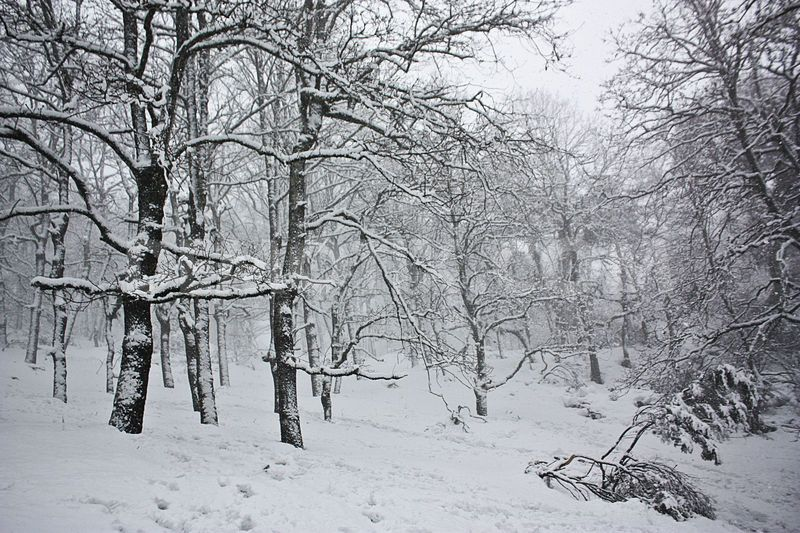
Tabarka snowfall in a forest

was also the seat of an ancient Bishopric and in antiquity it had a monastery for men and one for women, and several church Buildings and Christian cemeteries have been uncovered. The city contains several Christian cemeteries, many of the tombs covered with curious mosaics. An inscription (C.I.L., VIII, 173-82) mentions the cult of the martyr Anastasia and her companions.

Bishops

The bishops of Thabraca, who met with the other bishops of Proconsular Africa, included:

- Victoricus, at the Council of Carthage (256)
- Rusticianus, at the conference of Carthage in 411, where his competitor was the Donatist Charentius; he also signed in 416 the letter from the council of Proconsular Africa to Pope Innocent I;
- Clarissimus, who in 646 signed the letter from the same Council to Patriarch Paul II of Constantinople against the Monothelites.

The Bishopric was founded during the Roman Empire and survived through the arian Vandal and Orthodox Byzantine empires, only ceasing to function with the Muslim conquest of the Maghreb. The diocese was re-founded in name at least in the 20th century as a titular see of the Roman Catholic church.

Titular bishops

- Pierre Brigot, (22 Jan 1755 Appointed – 8 Nov 1791)
- St. Gabriel-Taurin Dufresse, (24 Jul 1798 Appointed – 14 Sep 1815)
- Edward Kernan (6 Feb 1818 Appointed – 19 Nov 1824)
- Rémi Gaulin † (10 May 1833 Appointed – 14 Jan 1840 Succeeded, Bishop of Kingston, Ontario)
- Bernardino di Milia, (27 Mar 1884 Appointed – 4 Jun 1891)
- Antonin Guillermain, (12 Jan 1895 Appointed – 14 Jul 1896)
- Henri Streicher, (1 Feb 1897 Appointed – 2 Jun 1933)
- Auguste-Joseph-Marie Cogneau (23 Jun 1933 Appointed – 12 Apr 1952)
- Georges Kettel, (24 Mar 1953 Appointed – 10 Nov 1959)
- Charles Quentin Bertram Olwell, (19 Jan 1961 Appointed – 30 Jan 1972)
- Antônio Agostinho Marochi (27 Sep 1973 Appointed – 2 Feb 1976)
- Sebastian Acol Dalis (18 Nov 1987 Appointed – 27 Oct 2004 Died)
- Pedro Joaquin Hernández Cantarero, (12 Feb 2005 Appointed – )

== Weather ==
=== Climate ===
The weather in Tabarka is usually variable from year to year. Summers are mostly hot and dry, but milder than the Saharan hinterland. It barely rains in July and August. The average temperatures for this season is 28.2 °C (82.8 °F). Winters are mostly rainy and mild. The average temperature for this season is 12.0 °C (53.6 °F).

Climate data for Tabarka (1991-2020, extremes 1953–present)
Month	Jan	Feb	Mar	Apr	May	Jun	Jul	Aug	Sep	Oct	Nov	Dec	Year
Record high °C (°F)	26.1 (79.0)	29.2 (84.6)	36.5 (97.7)	37.0 (98.6)	41.4 (106.5)	47.1 (116.8)	47.4 (117.3)	48.4 (119.1)	43.3 (109.9)	39.7 (103.5)	33.2 (91.8)	28.1 (82.6)	48.4 (119.1)
Mean daily maximum °C (°F)	16.0 (60.8)	16.1 (61.0)	18.5 (65.3)	21.0 (69.8)	24.9 (76.8)	28.9 (84.0)	31.7 (89.1)	32.3 (90.1)	29.1 (84.4)	25.8 (78.4)	20.8 (69.4)	17.1 (62.8)	23.5 (74.3)
Daily mean °C (°F)	11.8 (53.2)	11.8 (53.2)	13.9 (57.0)	16.2 (61.2)	19.6 (67.3)	23.2 (73.8)	25.9 (78.6)	26.7 (80.1)	24.1 (75.4)	20.9 (69.6)	16.4 (61.5)	13.1 (55.6)	18.6 (65.5)
Mean daily minimum °C (°F)	7.7 (45.9)	7.6 (45.7)	9.2 (48.6)	11.3 (52.3)	14.2 (57.6)	17.5 (63.5)	20.2 (68.4)	21.0 (69.8)	19.0 (66.2)	15.9 (60.6)	12.0 (53.6)	9.0 (48.2)	13.7 (56.7)
Record low °C (°F)	−0.5 (31.1)	−2.4 (27.7)	0.2 (32.4)	−1.4 (29.5)	3.0 (37.4)	7.5 (45.5)	8.5 (47.3)	9.0 (48.2)	8.5 (47.3)	4.0 (39.2)	0.5 (32.9)	0.0 (32.0)	−2.4 (27.7)
Average precipitation mm (inches)	148.1 (5.83)	126.1 (4.96)	97.3 (3.83)	70.0 (2.76)	41.0 (1.61)	16.2 (0.64)	3.8 (0.15)	15.3 (0.60)	79.4 (3.13)	116.2 (4.57)	160.8 (6.33)	166.1 (6.54)	1,040.4 (40.96)
Average precipitation days (≥ 1 mm)	12.4	11.2	9.2	7.7	5.2	1.9	0.7	2.1	7.0	8.5	11.7	13.2	90.7
Average relative humidity (%)	72	73	73	72	72	70	65	68	70	71	75	74	71
Mean monthly sunshine hours	137.7	153.1	204.6	221.4	279.4	313.0	355.5	319.6	239.9	205.4	147.7	130.6	2,707.9
Source 1: NOAA
Source 2: Institut National de la Météorologie (humidity 1961–1990, sun 1981-2010) (Note: The Station ID for Tabarka is 22525211.)

Tabarka mean sea temperature
Jan	Feb	Mar	Apr	May	Jun	Jul	Aug	Sep	Oct	Nov	Dec
16 °C (61 °F)	15 °C (59 °F)	15 °C (59 °F)	16 °C (61 °F)	18 °C (64 °F)	21 °C (70 °F)	24 °C (75 °F)	26 °C (79 °F)	25 °C (77 °F)	23 °C (73 °F)	20 °C (68 °F)	17 °C (63 °F)

== Transport ==
The airport in Tabarka was named Airport 7 Novembre until the Tunisian revolution; it was then renamed Tabarka-Ain Draham International Airport.

== See also ==
- Tabarka Rocks
- Tabarka Jazz Festival
- Fossa regia
- Genoese-Tabarka diaspora
  - Calasetta
  - San Pietro Island
  - Carloforte
  - Tabarca
- European enclaves in North Africa before 1830

Featured in film, The Golden Salamander, with Trevor Howard, Herbert Lom and Anouk Aimee.{Paul Thomson}

== Gallery ==
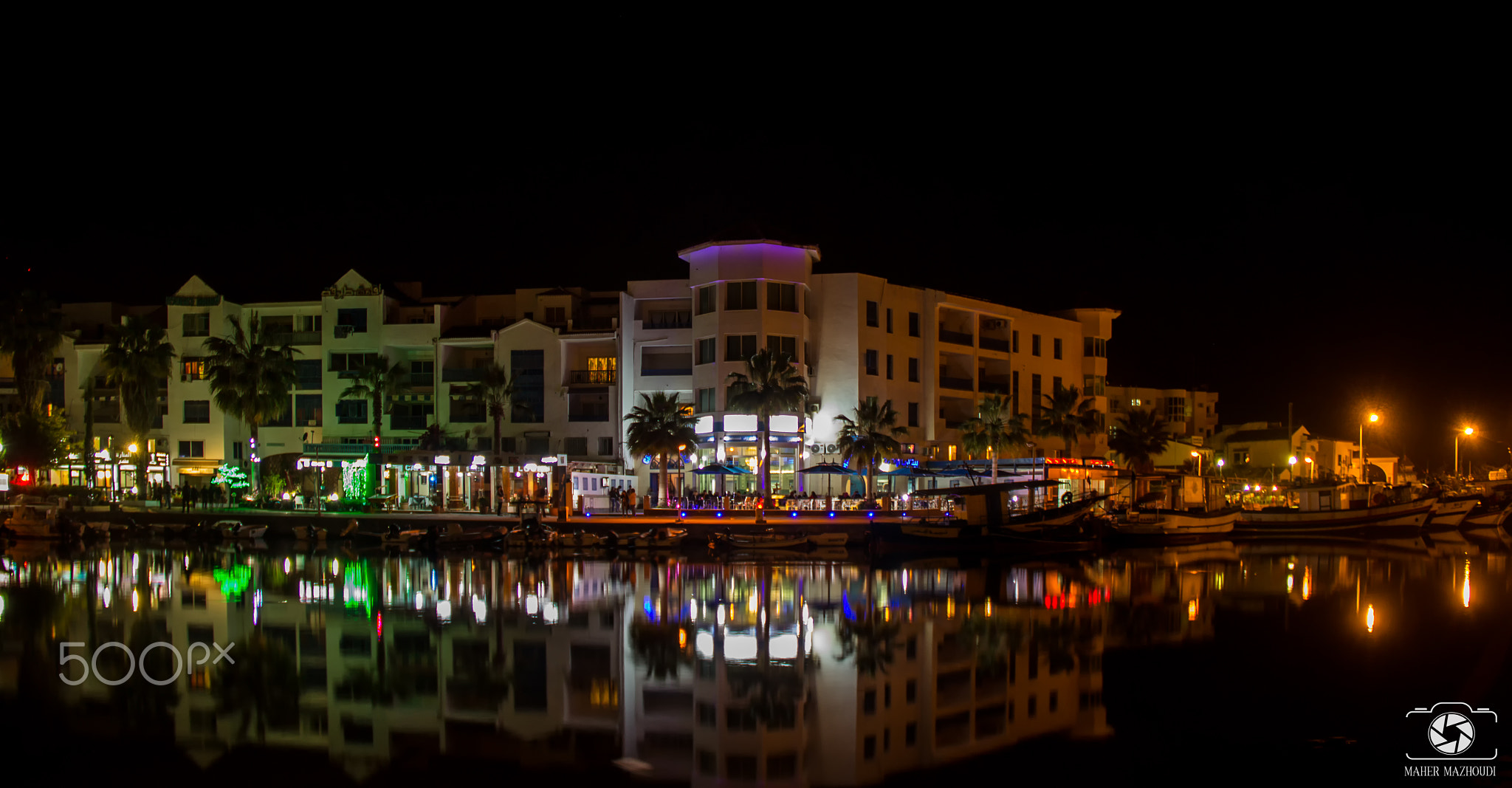

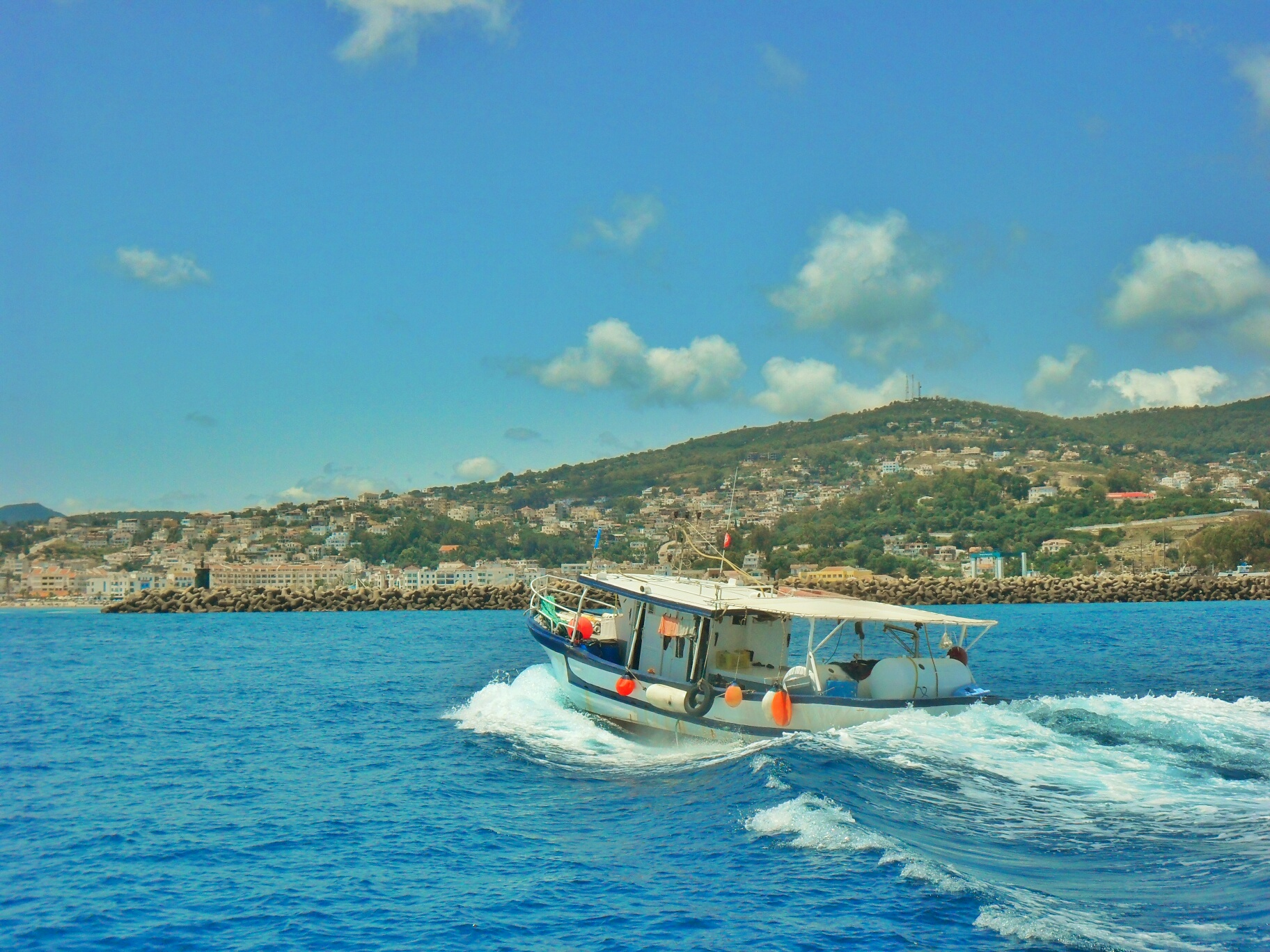

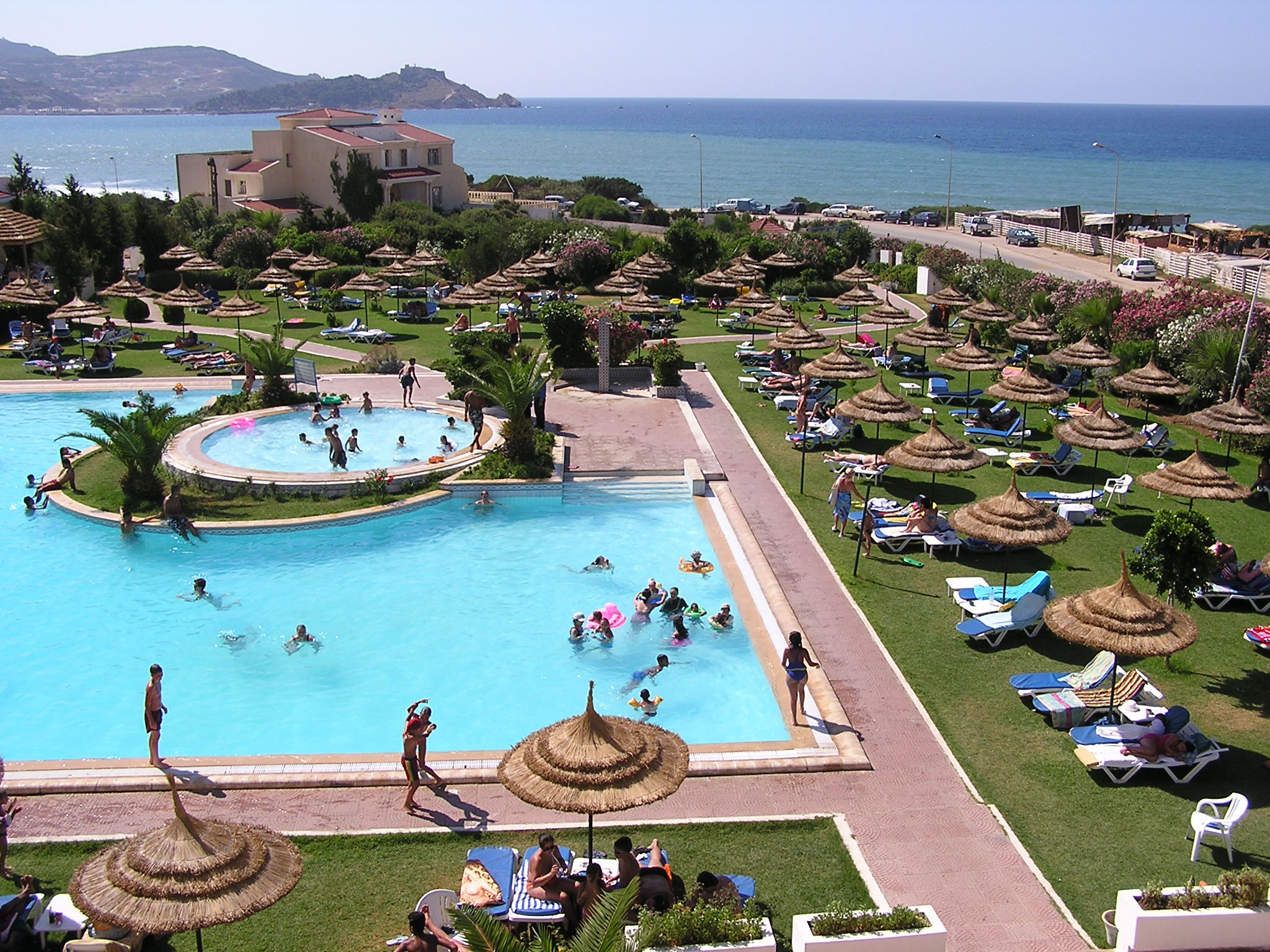

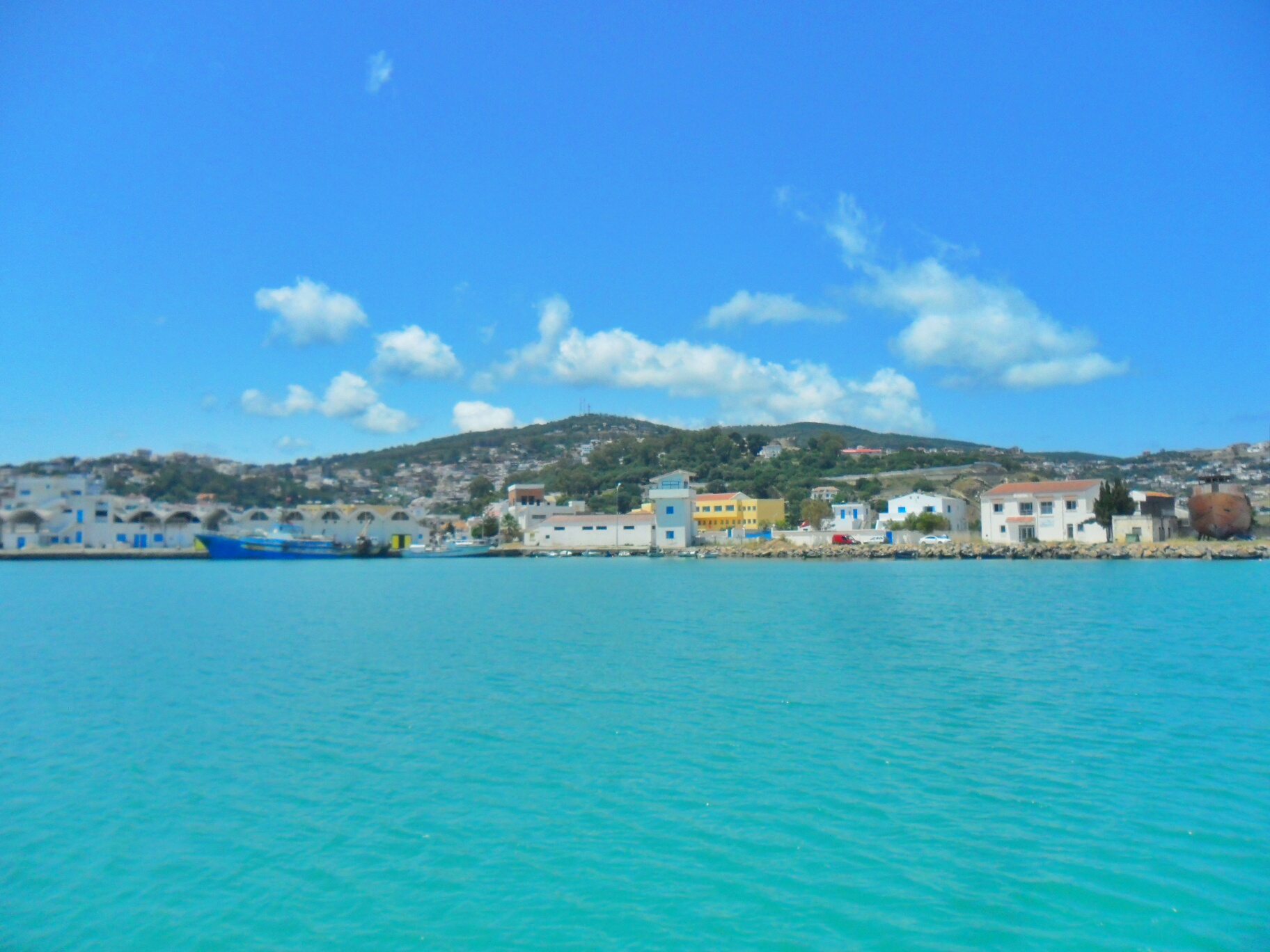

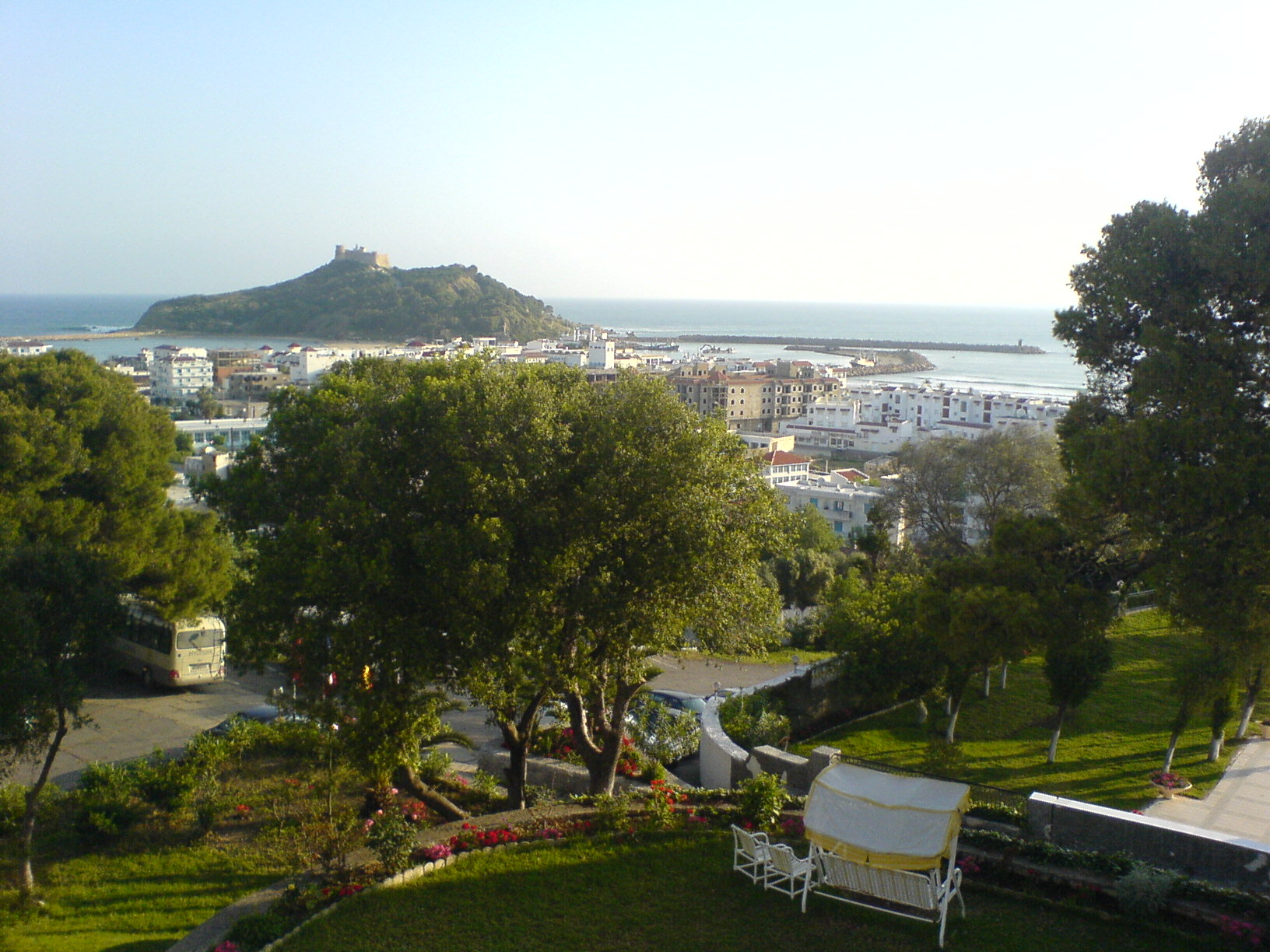

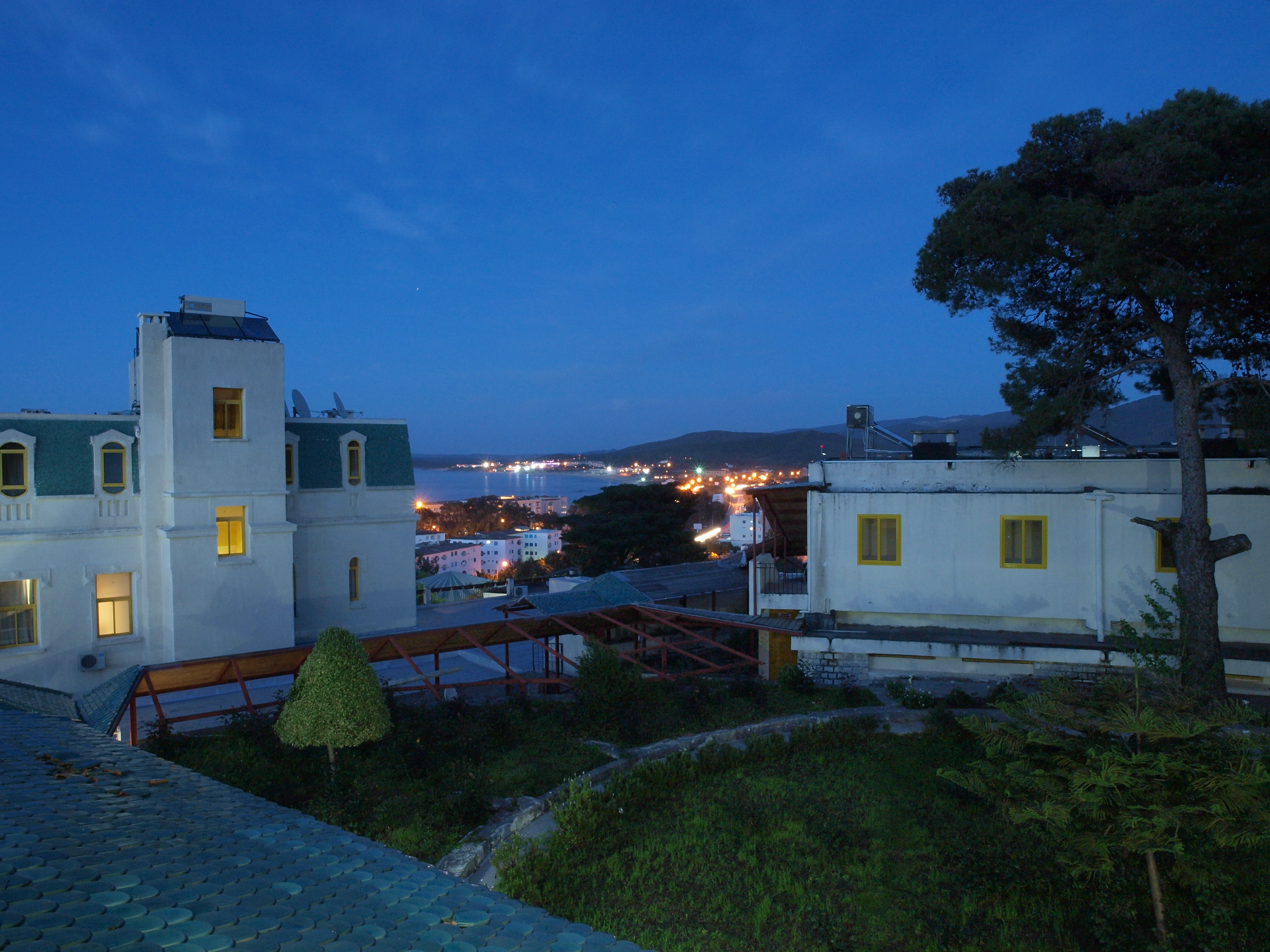

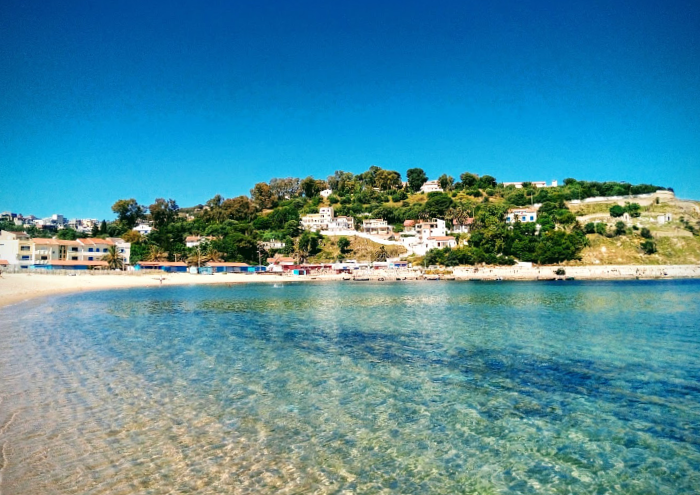

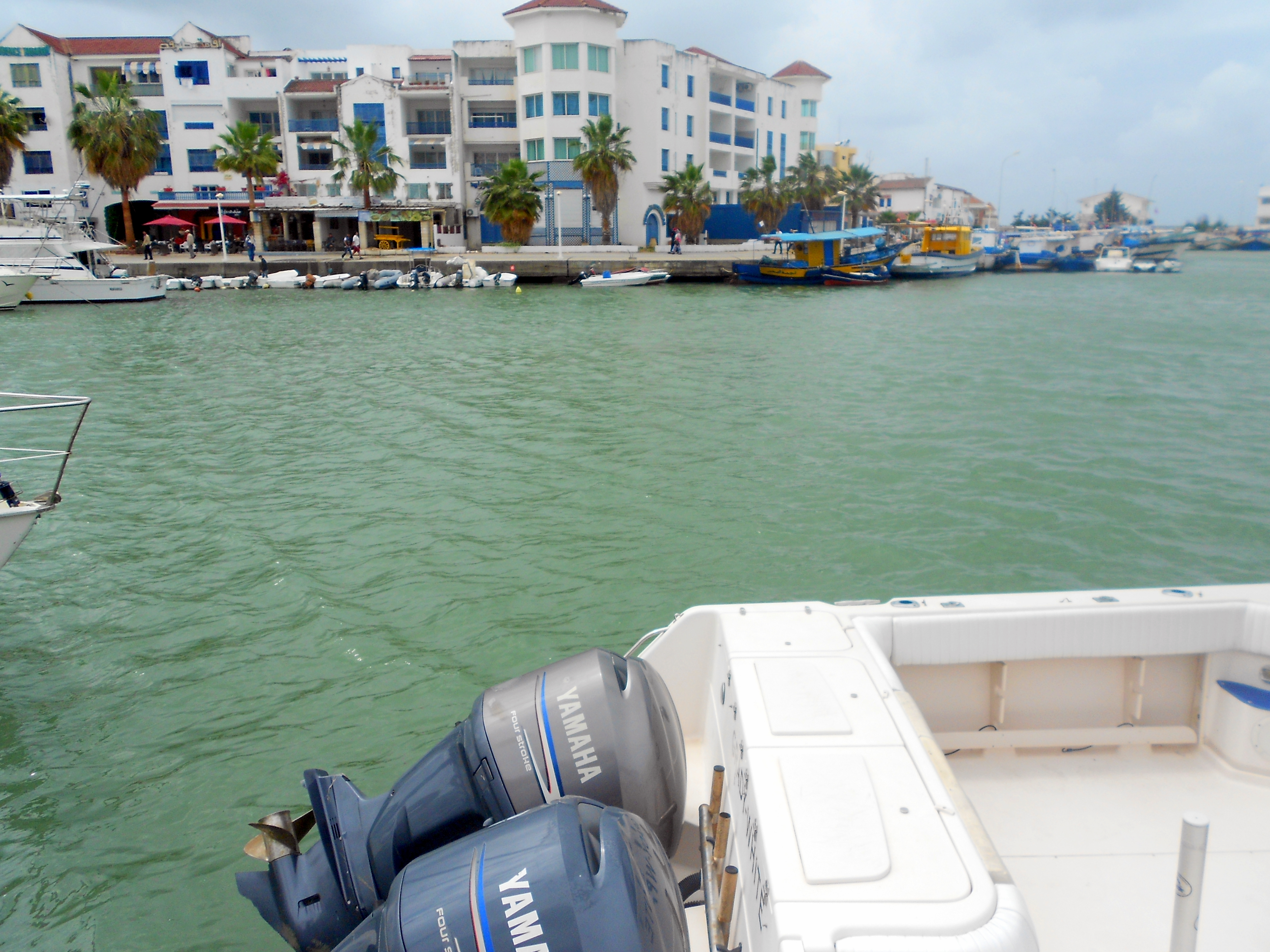

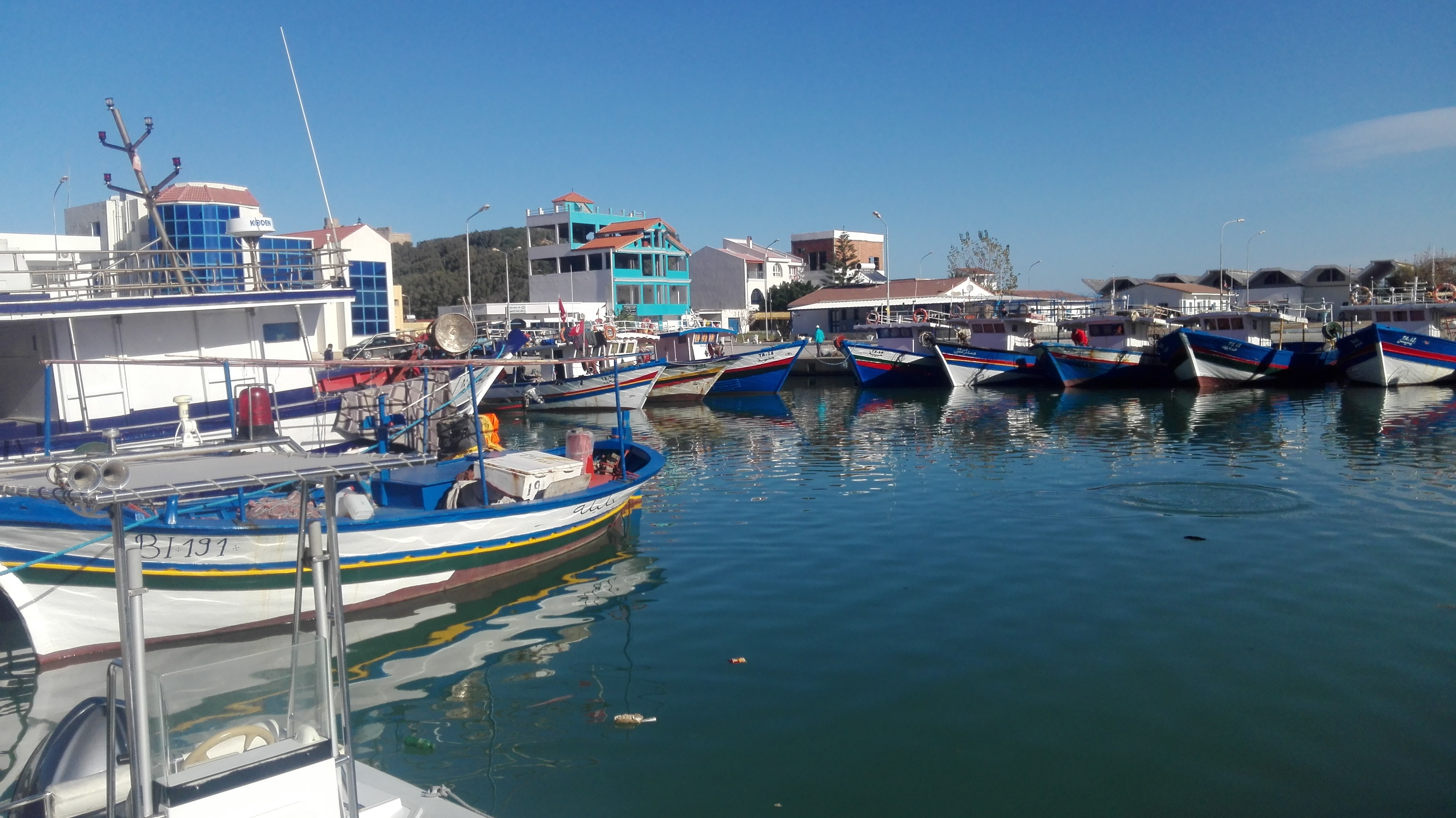

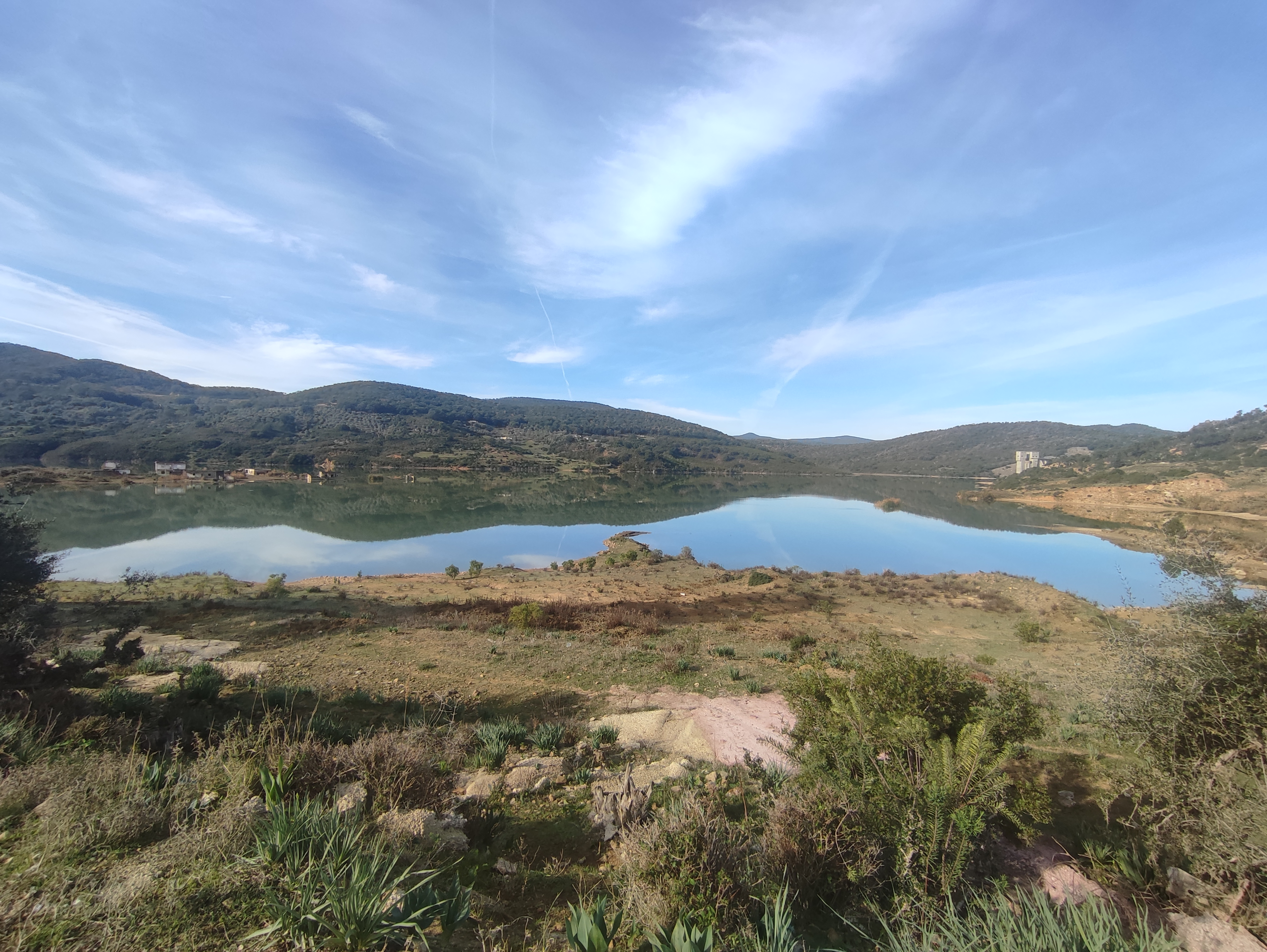

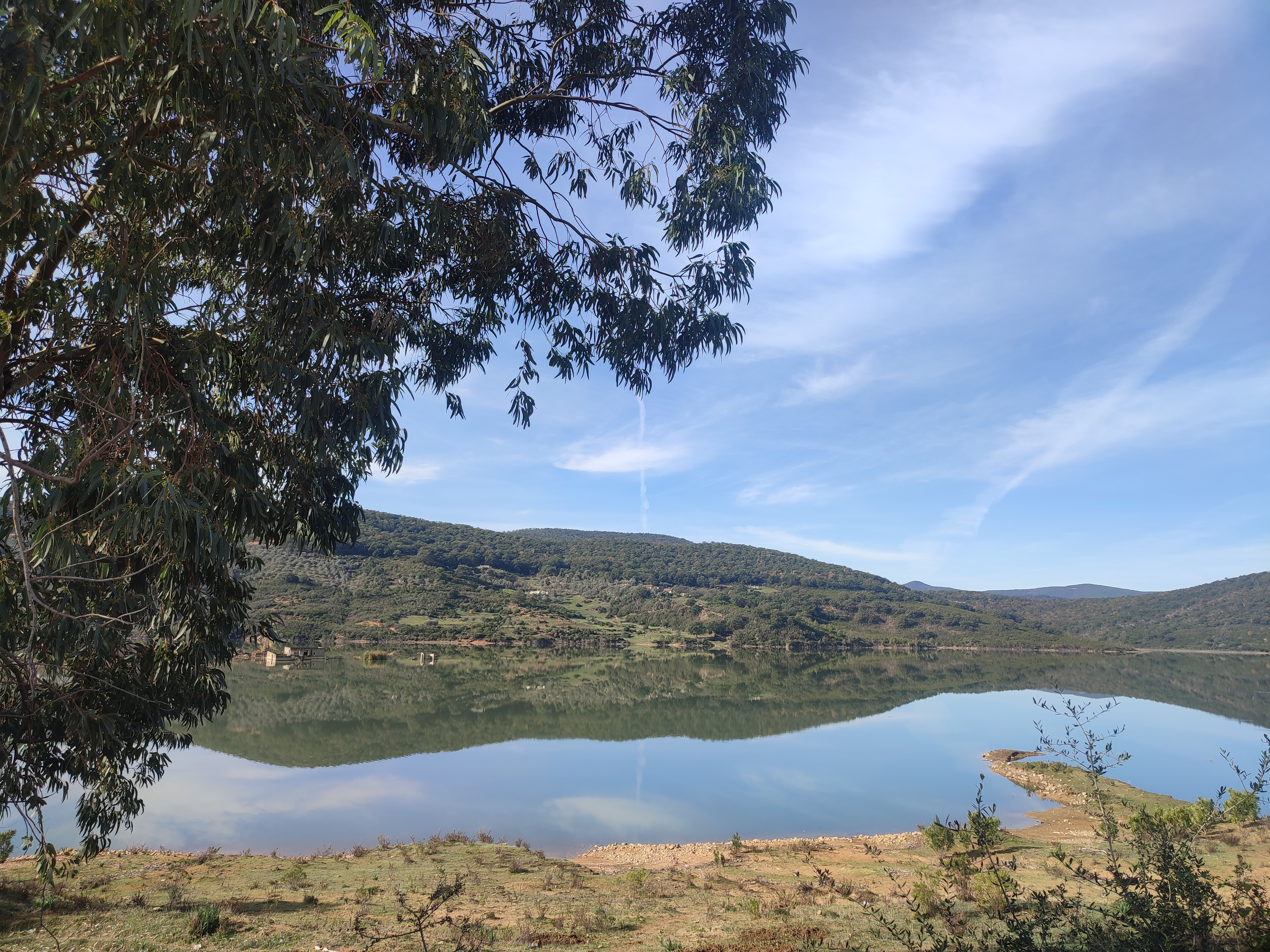

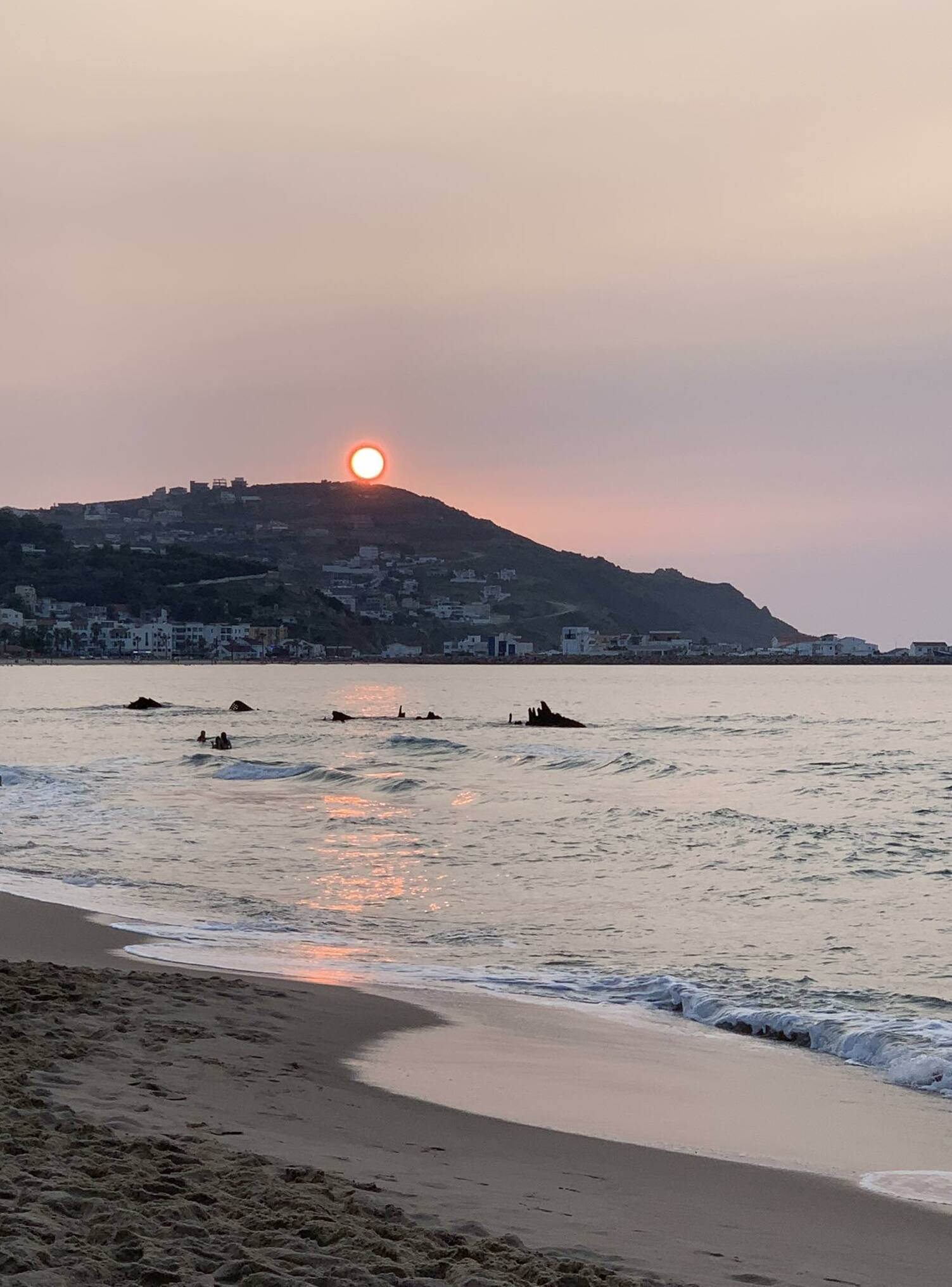
