= 2010 Morocco Tennis Tour – Marrakech =

Tennis Tournament

- Date: March 15 – March 21
- Edition: 4th
- Location: Marrakesh, Morocco

Champions

Singles
- (Finland) Jarkko Nieminen

Doubles
- (Serbia) Ilija Bozoljac / (Romania) Horia Tecău
- Morocco Tennis Tour – Marrakech

The 2010 Morocco Tennis Tour – Marrakech was a professional tennis tournament. Part of the 2010 ATP Challenger Tour, it took place on outdoor red clay courts in Marrakesh, Morocco between 15 and 21 March 2010.

== ATP entrants ==
=== Seeds ===
Nationality	Player	Ranking*	Seeding
UKR	Oleksandr Dolgopolov Jr.	80	1
FIN	Jarkko Nieminen	85	2
BEL	Steve Darcis	99	3
SLO	Blaž Kavčič	101	4
RUS	Teymuraz Gabashvili	107	5
ESP	Marcel Granollers	110	6
ROU	Victor Crivoi	115	7
ITA	Simone Bolelli	126	8

- Rankings are as of March 8, 2010.

=== Other entrants ===
The following players received wildcards into the singles main draw:

- (Morocco) Rabie Chaki
- (Morocco) Reda El Amrani
- (Tunisia) Malek Jaziri
- (Morocco) Mehdi Ziadi

The following players received entry from the qualifying draw:

- (Italy) Andrea Arnaboldi
- (Belgium) David Goffin
- (Germany) Denis Gremelmayr
- (Spain) Sergio Gutiérrez Ferrol

The following player received special exempt into the main draw:

- (Germany) Bastian Knittel

== Champions ==
=== Singles ===
(Finland) Jarkko Nieminen def. (Ukraine) Oleksandr Dolgopolov Jr., 6–3, 6–2

=== Doubles ===
(Serbia) Ilija Bozoljac / (Romania) Horia Tecău def. (United States) James Cerretani / (Canada) Adil Shamasdin, 6–1, 6–1
