= Talal Ouahabi =

Moroccan tennis player

- Country (sports): Morocco
- Born: 1 August 1978 (age 47)
- Plays: Right-handed
- Prize money: $49,817

Singles
- Career record: 3–6 (ATP Tour & Davis Cup)
- Highest ranking: No. 382 (24 August 2009)

Doubles
- Career record: 2–7 (ATP Tour & Davis Cup)
- Highest ranking: No. 416 (31 August 2009)

Talal Ouahabi (born 1 August 1978) is a Moroccan former professional tennis player.

Ouahabi, who had a career best singles ranking of 382, appeared twice in the main draw of the Grand Prix Hassan II tournament on the ATP Tour and won six ITF Futures titles.

A Moroccan representative at the 1999 Pan Arab Games, Ouahabi was a member of the Morocco Davis Cup team from 2005 to 2011. He featured in a total of 10 ties, for three singles and two doubles wins.

== ITF Futures titles ==
=== Singles: (6) ===
No.	Date	Tournament	Surface	Opponent	Score
1.	Oct 2006	Kenya F1, Mombasa	Hard	(South Korea) Kim Cheong-eui	6–4, 6–2
2.	Oct 2006	Botswana F1, Gaborone	Hard	(France) Clément Morel	4–6, 7–6^{(6)}, 6–3
3.	Jun 2008	Morocco F3, Agadir	Clay	(France) Julien Mathieu	6–4, 7–5
4.	Aug 2008	Egypt F3, Cairo	Clay	(Japan) Junn Mitsuhashi	6–2, 6–4
5.	Sep 2008	Egypt F5, Cairo	Clay	(Egypt) Sherif Sabry	4–6, 7–5, 7–5
6.	April 2009	Egypt F6, Cairo	Clay	(Egypt) Karim Maamoun	7–5, 6–3

=== Doubles: (5) ===
No.	Date	Tournament	Surface	Partner	Opponents	Score
1.	Jun 2003	Morocco F3, Rabat	Clay	(Tunisia) Walid Jallali	(Morocco) Anass Lanrani (Morocco) Mehdi Ziadi	6–3, 6–2
2.	Oct 2006	Botswana F1, Gaborone	Hard	(Tunisia) Walid Jallali	(Slovakia) Matus Horecny (Slovakia) Martin Hromec	4–6, 6–4, 7–6^{3}
3.	Aug 2008	Egypt F4, Giza	Clay	(Morocco) Anas Fattar	(Russia) Andemir Karanashev (Russia) Roman Kislianskii	6–3, 7–5
4.	Oct 2008	Morocco F6, Khemisset	Clay	(Algeria) Lamine Ouahab	(Morocco) Mohamed Saber (Morocco) Mehdi Ziadi	6–2, 6–1
5.	March 2009	Egypt F4, 6th of October	Clay	(Morocco) Mounir El Aarej	(Egypt) Mohamed Mamoun (North Macedonia) Predrag Rusevski	6–4, 4–6, [13–11]

== See also ==
- List of Morocco Davis Cup team representatives
