= Anas Fattar =

Moroccan tennis player (born 1987)

- Country (sports): Morocco
- Born: 12 May 1987 (age 39) Casablanca, Morocco
- Prize money: $53,619

Singles
- Career record: 0–1 (at ATP Tour level, Grand Slam level, and in Davis Cup)
- Career titles: 0
- Highest ranking: No. 599 (15 December 2008)
- Current ranking: No. 831 (30 December 2019)

Doubles
- Career record: 3–4 (at ATP Tour level, Grand Slam level, and in Davis Cup)
- Career titles: 0; 0 Challenger, 7 Futures
- Highest ranking: No. 455 (9 August 2010)
- Current ranking: No. 783 (30 December 2019)

Team competitions
- Davis Cup: 3–2
- Last updated on: 30 December 2019.

Anas Fattar (born 12 May 1987) is a Moroccan tennis player.

Fattar has a career high ATP singles ranking of 599 achieved on 15 December 2008. He also has a career high ATP doubles ranking of 455, which was achieved on 9 August 2010. Fattar has won 7 ITF Futures doubles titles.

Fattar has represented Morocco at the Davis Cup.

== Future and Challenger finals ==
=== Singles: 1 (0–1) ===
Legend
ATP Challengers 0 (0–0)
ITF Futures 1 (0–1)

Result	W–L	Date	Tournament	Surface	Opponent	Score
Loss	0–1	Aug 2008	Antalya, Turkey F20	Clay	(Germany) Andre Begemann	4–6, 3–6

=== Doubles 12 (7–5) ===
Legend
ATP Challengers 0 (0–0)
ITF Futures/World Tennis Tour 12 (7–5)

Result	W–L	Date	Tournament	Surface	Partner	Opponents	Score
Win	1–0	Oct 2006	Accra, Ghana F1	Clay	(Morocco) Reda El Amrani	(Nigeria) Abdul-Mumin Babalola (Togo) Komlavi Loglo	4–6, 6–3, 6–4
Loss	1–1	Jul 2007	Rabat, Morocco F4	Clay	(Morocco) Mehdi Ziadi	(Tunisia) Mohamed Haythem Abid (Tunisia) Walid Jallali	2–6, 2–6
Win	2–1	Jul 2007	Khemisset, Morocco F5	Clay	(Morocco) Mehdi Ziadi	(France) Franck Dalla-Santa (France) Antoine Hamard	6–3, 6–3
Loss	2–2	Aug 2008	Cairo, Egypt F3	Clay	(Morocco) Talal Ouahabi	(Egypt) Karim Maamoun (Egypt) Sherif Sabry	5–7, 2–6
Win	3–2	Aug 2008	Giza, Egypt F4	Clay	(Morocco) Talal Ouahabi	(Russia) Andemir Karanashev (Russia) Roman Kislyanskiy	6–3, 7–5
Loss	3–3	Oct 2008	Casablanca, Morocco F7	Clay	(Morocco) Yassine Idmbarek	(Netherlands) Romano Frantzen (Netherlands) Nick van der Meer	3–6, 1–6
Win	4–3	Aug 2009	Cairo, Egypt F11	Clay	(Morocco) Younès Rachidi	(Poland) Marcin Domaszewicz (Russia) Sergei Pershin	5–7, 7–6^{(7–3)}, [10–1]
Win	5–3	Oct 2009	Lagos, Nigeria F1	Hard	(Morocco) Reda El Amrani	(Togo) Komlavi Loglo (Ivory Coast) Valentin Sanon	6–4, 3–6, [10–3]
Win	6–3	Jul 2010	Khemisset, Morocco F5	Clay	(Morocco) Mehdi Benhammou	(Belgium) Marco Dierckx (Belgium) Bart Govaerts	7–5, 6–7^{(4–7)}, [10–7]
Loss	6–4	Apr 2019	M15 Tabarka, Tunisia	Clay	(Argentina) Franco Emanuel Egea	(Germany) Constantin Schmitz (France) Maxime Tchoutakian	3–6, 2–6
Win	7–4	Jul 2019	M15 Casablanca, Morocco	Clay	(Morocco) Adam Moundir	(France) Pierre Delage (France) Nathan Seateun	6–4, 6–1
Loss	7–5	Oct 2019	M15 Tabarka, Tunisia	Clay	(Algeria) Youcef Rihane	(Argentina) Nicolás Alberto Arreche (Argentina) Manuel Peña López	6–4, 3–6, [7–10]

== Davis Cup ==
=== Participations: (4–2) ===
Group membership World Group (0–0) WG Play-off (0–0) Group I (0–0) Group II (4–2) Group III (0–0) Group IV (0–0)	Matches by surface Hard (0–1) Clay (4–1) Grass (0–0) Carpet (0–0)	Matches by type Singles (0–1) Doubles (4–1)

- ▲ ▼ indicates the outcome of the Davis Cup match followed by the score, date, place of event, the zonal classification and its phase, and the court surface.

Rubber outcome	No.	Rubber	Match type (partner if any)	Opponent nation	Opponent player(s)	Score
▲5–0; 8-10 July 2011; Sereikiskiai Tennis Courts, Vilnius, Lithuania; Europe/Africa Zone Group II Relegation Playoff; Clay surface
Victory	1	III	Doubles (with Hicham Khaddari)	Lithuania	Lukas Mugevičius / Dovydas Šakinis	6–4, 6–4, 3–6, 6–2
▼2–3; 10-12 February 2012; Spyros Kyprianou Athletic Center, Limassol, Cyprus; Europe/Africa Zone Group II First round; Hard (indoor) surface
Defeat	2	III	Doubles (with Younès Rachidi)	Cyprus	Marcos Baghdatis / Rareș Cuzdriorean	3–6, 0–6, 2–6
▼2–3; 6-8 April 2012; Club Olympique Casablancais, Casablanca, Morocco; Europe/Africa Zone Group II Relegation Playoff; Clay surface
Victory	3	III	Doubles (with Mehdi Ziadi)	Monaco	Guillaume Couillard / Thomas Oger	6–4, 7–5, 7–5
Defeat	4	IV	Singles	Monaco	Benjamin Balleret	1–6, 4–6, 2–6
▼2–3; 5-6 April 2019; Royal Tennis Club de Marrakech, Marrakesh, Morocco; Europe/Africa Zone Group II First round; Clay surface
Victory	5	III	Doubles (with Lamine Ouahab)	Lithuania	Laurynas Grigelis / Julius Tverijonas	2–6, 6–3, 6–2
▲4–0; 6-7 March 2020; Royal Tennis Club de Marrakech, Marrakesh, Morocco; World Group II Play-off First round; Clay surface
Victory	6	III	Doubles (with Lamine Ouahab)	Vietnam	Lê Quốc Khánh / Lý Hoàng Nam	6–4, 6–1
