= Morocco Tennis Tour – Marrakech =

ATP Challenger Tour
- Event name: Marrakech
- Location: Marrakesh, Morocco
- Category: ATP Challenger Tour
- Surface: Red clay
- Draw: 32S/32Q/16D
- Prize money: €106,500+H
- Website: www.frmt.ma

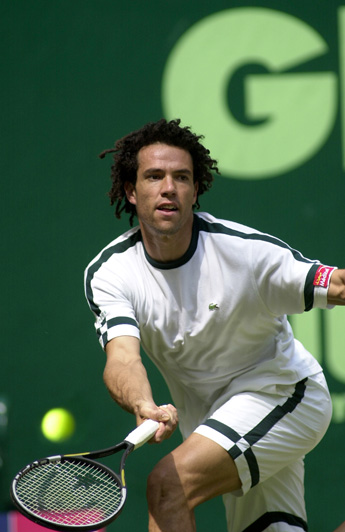
Younes El Aynaoui, from Rabat, Morocco won the first edition of the singles event against Peter Luczak

The Morocco Tennis Tour – Marrakech is a professional tennis tournament played on outdoor red clay courts. It is currently part of the ATP Challenger Tour. It is held annually in Marrakesh, Morocco, since 2007.

== Past finals ==
=== Singles ===
Year	Champion	Runner-up	Score
2012	(Slovakia) Martin Kližan	(Romania) Adrian Ungur	3–6, 6–3, 6–0
2011	(Portugal) Rui Machado	(France) Maxime Teixeira	6–3, 6–7(7), 6–4
2010	(Finland) Jarkko Nieminen	(Ukraine) Oleksandr Dolgopolov Jr.	6–3, 6–2
2009	(Brazil) Marcos Daniel	(Algeria) Lamine Ouahab	4–6, 7–5, 6–2
2008	(France) Gaël Monfils	(France) Jérémy Chardy	7–6(2), 7–6(6)
2007	(Morocco) Younes El Aynaoui	(Australia) Peter Luczak	6–2, 6–4

=== Doubles ===
Year	Champions	Runners-up	Score
2012	(Slovakia) Martin Kližan (Spain) Daniel Muñoz de la Nava	(Spain) Íñigo Cervantes Huegun (Argentina) Federico Delbonis	6–3, 1–6, [12–10]
2011	(Australia) Peter Luczak (Italy) Alessandro Motti	(United States) James Cerretani (Canada) Adil Shamasdin	7–6(5), 7–6(3)
2010	(Serbia) Ilija Bozoljac (Romania) Horia Tecău	(United States) James Cerretani (Canada) Adil Shamasdin	6–1, 6–1
2009	(Spain) Rubén Ramírez Hidalgo (Spain) Santiago Ventura	(Spain) Alberto Martín (Spain) Daniel Muñoz de la Nava	6–3, 7–6(5)
2008	(Portugal) Frederico Gil (Romania) Florin Mergea	(United Kingdom) James Auckland (United Kingdom) Jamie Delgado	6–2, 6–3
2007	(Czech Republic) Tomáš Cibulec (Australia) Jordan Kerr	(Czech Republic) Leoš Friedl (Slovakia) Michal Mertiňák	6–2, 6–4
