= 2009 Alessandria Challenger – Doubles =

Doubles
- 2009 Alessandria Challenger

Final
- Champions: (Spain) Rubén Ramírez Hidalgo (Spain) José Antonio Sánchez-de Luna
- Runners-up: (Argentina) Martín Alund (Chile) Guillermo Hormazábal
- Score: 6–4, 6–2

Events
Singles	Doubles
← 2008 ·	Alessandria Challenger	· 2010 →

Flavio Cipolla and Simone Vagnozzi were the champions in 2008. Cipolla chose to not play this year and Vagnozzi partnered up with Uros Vico. They lost to Paolo Lorenzi and Giancarlo Petrazzuolo in the first round.
Rubén Ramírez Hidalgo and José Antonio Sánchez-de Luna won in the final 6–4, 6–2, against Martín Alund and Guillermo Hormazábal.

== Seeds ==
1. (Spain) David Marrero / (Spain) Daniel Muñoz-de la Nava (semifinals)
2. (Colombia) Juan Sebastián Cabal / (Colombia) Alejandro Falla (quarterfinals)
3. (Spain) Carles Poch-Gradin / (Spain) Pablo Santos (first round)
4. (Spain) Rubén Ramírez Hidalgo / (Spain) José Antonio Sánchez-de Luna (champions)

== Draw ==
=== Key ===
- Q = Qualifier
- WC = Wild card
- LL = Lucky loser
- Alt = Alternate
- SE = Special exempt
- PR = Protected ranking
- ITF = ITF entry
- JE = Junior exempt
- w/o = Walkover
- r = Retired
- d = Defaulted
- SR = Special ranking

=== Draw ===
First round
1	(Spain) D Marrero (Spain) D Muñoz-de la Nava	6^{8}	6	[12]
WC	(Italy) M Crugnola (Italy) M Livraghi	7	3	[10]
(Italy) F Aldi (Italy) G Naso	6	2	[8]
WC	(Canada) P-L Duclos (Italy) J Marchegiani	4	6	[10]
4	(Spain) R Ramírez Hidalgo (Spain) JA Sánchez-de Luna	6	6
WC	(Lithuania) L Grigelis (Italy) A Stoppini	2	1
(Italy) S Vagnozzi (Italy) U Vico	3	2
(Italy) P Lorenzi (Italy) G Petrazzuolo	6	6
(Brazil) R Hocevar (Brazil) M Torres	2	3
(Brazil) A Miele (Brazil) C Zampieri	6	6
(United States) S Jenkins (United States) J Levine	6	4	[10]
3	(Spain) C Poch-Gradin (Spain) P Santos	3	6	[8]
(South Korea) KT Im (Japan) T Ito	6^{7}	3
(Argentina) M Alund (Chile) G Hormazábal	7	6
(Italy) F Colangelo (Italy) D Giorgini	3	3
2	(Colombia) JS Cabal (Colombia) A Falla	6	6

Quarterfinals
1	(Spain) D Marrero (Spain) D Muñoz-de la Nava	7	2	[10]
WC	(Canada) P-L Duclos (Italy) J Marchegiani	6^{4}	6	[3]
4	(Spain) R Ramírez Hidalgo (Spain) JA Sánchez-de Luna	7	4	[10]
(Italy) P Lorenzi (Italy) G Petrazzuolo	6^{6}	6	[4]
(Brazil) A Miele (Brazil) C Zampieri	4	3
(United States) S Jenkins (United States) J Levine	6	6
(Argentina) M Alund (Chile) G Hormazábal	6	6
2	(Colombia) JS Cabal (Colombia) A Falla	4	2

Semifinals
1	(Spain) D Marrero (Spain) D Muñoz-de la Nava	4	4
4	(Spain) R Ramírez Hidalgo (Spain) JA Sánchez-de Luna	6	6
(United States) S Jenkins (United States) J Levine	w/o
(Argentina) M Alund (Chile) G Hormazábal

Finals
4	(Spain) R Ramírez Hidalgo (Spain) JA Sánchez-de Luna	6	6
(Argentina) M Alund (Chile) G Hormazábal	4	2
