= 2008 Grand Prix Hassan II – Singles =

Singles
- 2008 Grand Prix Hassan II

Final
- Champion: (France) Gilles Simon
- Runner-up: (France) Julien Benneteau
- Score: 7–5, 6–2

Details
- Draw: 32 (4Q / 3WC)
- Seeds: 8

Events
Singles	Doubles
← 2007 ·	Grand Prix Hassan II	· 2009 →

Paul-Henri Mathieu was the defending champion, but chose not to participate that year.

Qualifier Gilles Simon won in the final 7–5, 6–2, against fifth-seeded Julien Benneteau.

== Seeds ==
1. (France) Jo-Wilfried Tsonga (semifinals, withdrew due to a knee injury)
2. (France) Gaël Monfils (second round)
3. (Argentina) Agustín Calleri (semifinals)
4. (France) Marc Gicquel (quarterfinals)
5. (France) Julien Benneteau (final)
6. (Australia) Chris Guccione (first round)
7. (France) Florent Serra (first round)
8. (Romania) Victor Hănescu (first round)

== Draw ==
=== Key ===
- Q = Qualifier
- WC = Wild card
- LL = Lucky loser
- Alt = Alternate
- SE = Special exempt
- PR = Protected ranking
- ITF = ITF entry
- JE = Junior exempt
- w/o = Walkover
- r = Retired
- d = Defaulted
- SR = Special ranking

=== Finals ===
Semifinals
1/WC	(France) Jo-Wilfried Tsonga
Q	(France) Gilles Simon	w/o
3	(Argentina) Agustín Calleri	6	1	3
5	(France) Julien Benneteau	1	6	6

Final
Q	(France) Gilles Simon	7	6
5	(France) Julien Benneteau	5	2

=== Top half ===
First round
1/WC	(France) J-W Tsonga	6	7^{12}
(Spain) A Montañés	4	6^{10}
(Argentina) M Vassallo Argüello	5	2
WC	(Algeria) L Ouahab	7	6
(France) A Clément	6^{6}	1
(Spain) S Ventura	7^{8}	6
(Germany) R Schüttler	6	6^{5}	6
6	(Australia) C Guccione	4	7^{7}	2
4	(France) M Gicquel	6	6
Q	(Spain) R Ramírez Hidalgo	3	0
(Argentina) G Coria	4	6	6
Q	(Canada) P Polansky	6	4	3
(Serbia) B Pašanski	2	6	7^{7}
(Germany) B Becker	6	3	6^{3}
Q	(France) G Simon	6	5	6
7	(France) F Serra	2	7	3

Second round
1/WC	(France) J-W Tsonga	6	6
WC	(Algeria) L Ouahab	3	2
(Spain) S Ventura	2	6	6
(Germany) R Schüttler	6	4	0
4	(France) M Gicquel	6	2	7^{7}
(Argentina) G Coria	1	6	6^{2}
(Serbia) B Pašanski	6	4	3
Q	(France) G Simon	3	6	6

Quarterfinals
1/WC	(France) J-W Tsonga	6	6
(Spain) S Ventura	3	3
4	(France) M Gicquel	3	2
Q	(France) G Simon	6	6

Semifinals
1/WC	(France) J-W Tsonga
Q	(France) G Simon	w/o

=== Bottom half ===
First round
8	(Romania) V Hănescu	2	7^{8}	3
WC	(Morocco) Y El Aynaoui	6	6^{6}	6
(Australia) P Luczak	1^{r}
(Slovakia) D Hrbatý	2
(Brazil) M Daniel	7^{7}	6^{0}	4
(France) O Patience	6^{5}	7^{7}	6
(France) T Ascione	6	1	2
3	(Argentina) A Calleri	3	6	6
5	(France) J Benneteau	2	6	6
(Germany) F Mayer	6	3	4
(Uruguay) P Cuevas	6	6
Q	(South Korea) W-s Jun	4	1
(Canada) F Dancevic	7^{7}	4	6^{5}
(Spain) Ó Hernández	6^{4}	6	7^{7}
(Spain) G García López	7	5	0
2	(France) G Monfils	6	7	6

Second round
WC	(Morocco) Y El Aynaoui	6	7
(Slovakia) D Hrbatý	3	5
(France) O Patience	2	5
3	(Argentina) A Calleri	6	7
5	(France) J Benneteau	6	6
(Uruguay) P Cuevas	4	4
(Spain) Ó Hernández	6	6
2	(France) G Monfils	3	2

Quarterfinals
WC	(Morocco) Y El Aynaoui
3	(Argentina) A Calleri	w/o
5	(France) J Benneteau	6	5
(Spain) Ó Hernández	3	2^{r}

Semifinals
3	(Argentina) A Calleri	6	1	3
5	(France) J Benneteau	1	6	6
