= 2010 Morocco Tennis Tour – Tanger – Doubles =

Tanger – Doubles
- 2010 Morocco Tennis Tour – Tanger

Final
- Champions: (Belgium) Steve Darcis; (Germany) Dominik Meffert
- Runners-up: (Belarus) Uladzimir Ignatik; (Slovakia) Martin Kližan
- Score: 5–7, 7–5, [10–7]

Events
Singles	Doubles
← 2009 ·	Morocco Tennis Tour – Tanger	· 2013 →

Augustin Gensse and Éric Prodon were the defending champions, but they chose to not participate.
Steve Darcis and Dominik Meffert won in the final 5–7, 7–5, [10–7], against Uladzimir Ignatik and Martin Kližan.

== Seeds ==
1. (India) Harsh Mankad / (Canada) Adil Shamasdin (quarterfinals)
2. (Italy) Alessio di Mauro / (Italy) Simone Vagnozzi (quarterfinals, withdrew)
3. (Spain) David Marrero / (Spain) Daniel Muñoz de la Nava (semifinals)
4. (Ukraine) Ivan Anikanov / (Russia) Dmitri Sitak (quarterfinals)

== Draw ==
=== Key ===
- Q = Qualifier
- WC = Wild card
- LL = Lucky loser
- Alt = Alternate
- SE = Special exempt
- PR = Protected ranking
- ITF = ITF entry
- JE = Junior exempt
- w/o = Walkover
- r = Retired
- d = Defaulted
- SR = Special ranking

=== Draw ===
First round

Quarterfinals

Semifinals

Finals

1
- (India) H Mankad
- (Canada) A Shamasdin
w/o

- (Slovenia) B Kavčič
- (Czech Republic) D Lojda

1
- (India) H Mankad
- (Canada) A Shamasdin
5
6
[7]

WC
- (Morocco) M Saber
- (Morocco) M Ziadi
3
6
[2]

- (Belgium) S Darcis
- (Germany) D Meffert
7
3
[10]

- (Belgium) S Darcis
- (Germany) D Meffert
6
2
[10]

- (Belgium) S Darcis
- (Germany) D Meffert
6
6

4
- (Ukraine) I Anikanov
- (Russia) D Sitak
6
3
[10]

- (Italy) A Arnaboldi
- (Spain) P Riba
4
3

- (Spain) I Navarro
- (Spain) A Ramos Viñolas
3
6
[6]

4
- (Ukraine) I Anikanov
- (Russia) D Sitak
5
5

- (Ukraine) O Dolgopolov Jr.
- (Ukraine) A Smirnov
1
2

- (Italy) A Arnaboldi
- (Spain) P Riba
7
7

- (Italy) A Arnaboldi
- (Spain) P Riba
6
6

- (Belgium) S Darcis
5
7
[10]

- (Italy) A Brizzi
- (Algeria) L Ouahab
3
4

ALT
- (Belarus) U Ignatik
- (Slovakia) M Kližan
7
5
[7]

- (Austria) A Haider-Maurer
- (Croatia) A Veić
6
6

- (Austria) A Haider-Maurer
- (Croatia) A Veić
6^{4}
2

WC
- (Morocco) R El Amrani
- (Morocco) H Khaddari
3
3

3
- (Spain) D Marrero
7
6

3
- (Spain) D Marrero
6
6

3
- (Spain) D Marrero
2
0

ALT
- (Belarus) U Ignatik
- (Slovakia) M Kližan
w/o

ALT
- (Belarus) U Ignatik
- (Slovakia) M Kližan
6
6

WC
- (Morocco) A Fattar
- (Morocco) Y Idmbarek

ALT
- (Belarus) U Ignatik
- (Slovakia) M Kližan
w/o

- (Portugal) R Machado
- (Spain) C Poch-Gradin
1
1

2
- (Italy) A di Mauro
- (Italy) S Vagnozzi

2
- (Italy) A di Mauro
- (Italy) S Vagnozzi
6
6
