= 2009 Grand Prix Hassan II – Doubles =

Doubles
- 2009 Grand Prix Hassan II

Final
- Champions: (Poland) Łukasz Kubot (Austria) Oliver Marach
- Runners-up: (Sweden) Simon Aspelin (Australia) Paul Hanley
- Score: 7–6^{(7–4)}, 3–6, [10–6]

Events
| Singles | Doubles |
| ← 2008 · | Grand Prix Hassan II | · 2010 → |

Albert Montañés and Santiago Ventura were the defending champions, but lost in the quarterfinals to Łukasz Kubot and Oliver Marach.

== Seeds ==
1. (Poland) Łukasz Kubot / (Austria) Oliver Marach (champions)
2. (Sweden) Simon Aspelin / (Australia) Paul Hanley (final)
3. (Germany) Christopher Kas / (Netherlands) Rogier Wassen (semifinals)
4. (Sweden) Johan Brunström / (Netherlands Antilles) Jean-Julien Rojer (quarterfinals)

== Draw ==
=== Key ===
- Q = Qualifier
- WC = Wild card
- LL = Lucky loser
- Alt = Alternate
- SE = Special exempt
- PR = Protected ranking
- ITF = ITF entry
- JE = Junior exempt
- w/o = Walkover
- r = Retired
- d = Defaulted
- SR = Special ranking

=== Finals ===
First round
1 | (Poland) Ł Kubot (Austria) O Marach | 7 | 6
(France) N Devilder (Belgium) C Rochus | 5 | 4
WC | (Morocco) M Saber (Morocco) M Ziadi | 4 | 3
(Spain) A Montañés (Spain) S Ventura | 6 | 6
4 | (Sweden) J Brunström (Netherlands Antilles) J-J Rojer | 6 | 7^{7}
ALT | (Italy) F Cipolla (Italy) P Starace | 4 | 6^{2}
WC | (Morocco) R Chaki (Morocco) R El Amrani | 7^{8} | 3 | [2]
(Czech Republic) L Friedl (Czech Republic) D Škoch | 6^{6} | 6 | [10]
(Portugal) F Gil (Romania) H Tecău | 5 | 6 | [11]
(France) M Gicquel (France) F Serra | 7 | 4 | [9]
(Switzerland) Y Allegro (France) A Clément | 6^{9} | 3
3 | (Germany) C Kas (Netherlands) R Wassen | 7^{11} | 6
(India) R Bopanna (Croatia) L Zovko | 6^{4} | 3
(Brazil) T Bellucci (United States) E Butorac | 7^{7} | 6
(Spain) Óscar Hernández (Spain) A Martín | 3 | 7^{7} | [6]
2 | (Sweden) S Aspelin (Australia) P Hanley | 6 | 6^{5} | [10]

Quarterfinals
1 | (Poland) Ł Kubot (Austria) O Marach | 6 | 4 | [10]
(Spain) A Montañés (Spain) S Ventura | 4 | 6 | [6]
4 | (Sweden) J Brunström (Netherlands Antilles) J-J Rojer | 4 | 3
(Czech Republic) L Friedl (Czech Republic) D Škoch | 6 | 6
(Portugal) F Gil (Romania) H Tecău | 6 | 2
3 | (Germany) C Kas (Netherlands) R Wassen | 7 | 6
(Brazil) T Bellucci (United States) E Butorac | 3 | 3
2 | (Sweden) S Aspelin (Australia) P Hanley | 6 | 6

Semifinals
1 | (Poland) Ł Kubot (Austria) O Marach | 6 | 4 | [12]
(Czech Republic) L Friedl (Czech Republic) D Škoch | 2 | 6 | [10]
3 | (Germany) C Kas (Netherlands) R Wassen | 5 | 2
2 | (Sweden) S Aspelin (Australia) P Hanley | 7 | 6

Final
1 | (Poland) Ł Kubot (Austria) O Marach | 7^{7} | 3 | [10]
2 | (Sweden) S Aspelin (Australia) P Hanley | 6^{4} | 6 | [6]
