= 2009 Alessandria Challenger – Singles =

Singles
- 2009 Alessandria Challenger

Final
- Champion: (Slovenia) Blaž Kavčič
- Runner-up: (United States) Jesse Levine
- Score: 7–5, 6–3

Events
Singles	Doubles
← 2008 ·	Alessandria Challenger	· 2010 →

Paolo Lorenzi was the defender of title, but he lost to Kavčič in the first round.
Blaž Kavčič won in the final 7–5, 6–3, against Jesse Levine.

== Seeds ==
1. (Spain) Rubén Ramírez Hidalgo (semifinals)
2. (United States) Jesse Levine (final)
3. (Brazil) Ricardo Hocevar (quarterfinals)
4. (Spain) David Marrero (first round)
5. (Ecuador) Giovanni Lapentti (first round)
6. (Colombia) Alejandro Falla (semifinals)
7. (Italy) Paolo Lorenzi (first round)
8. (Spain) Daniel Muñoz-de la Nava (quarterfinals)

== Draw ==
=== Key ===
- Q = Qualifier
- WC = Wild card
- LL = Lucky loser
- Alt = Alternate
- SE = Special exempt
- PR = Protected ranking
- ITF = ITF entry
- JE = Junior exempt
- w/o = Walkover
- r = Retired
- d = Defaulted
- SR = Special ranking

=== Final four ===
Semifinals
1/WC	(Spain) Rubén Ramírez Hidalgo	0	5
(Slovenia) Blaž Kavčič	6	7
6	(Colombia) Alejandro Falla	2	3
2	(United States) Jesse Levine	6	6

Final
(Slovenia) Blaž Kavčič	7	6
2	(United States) Jesse Levine	5	3

=== Top half ===
First round
1/WC	(Spain) R Ramírez Hidalgo	6	6
(South Korea) KT Im	4	2
Q	(Italy) F Aldi	6	7
WC	(Italy) J Marchegiani	2	5
(Italy) R Ghedin	6	6^{8}	6
WC	(Lithuania) L Grigelis	3	7	1
(France) S Robert	7	6
5	(Ecuador) G Lapentti	5	1
4	(Spain) D Marrero	3	5
(Italy) M Crugnola	6	7
ALT	(Italy) G Naso	6	6
(Spain) C Poch-Gradin	4	2
(Spain) P Santos	4	6	6
(Brazil) A Miele	6	3	3
(Slovenia) B Kavčič	7	6
7	(Italy) P Lorenzi	6^{4}	3

Second round
1/WC	(Spain) R Ramírez Hidalgo	3	6	7
Q	(Italy) F Aldi	6	3	5
(Italy) R Ghedin	3	5
(France) S Robert	6	7
(Italy) M Crugnola	1	7	6
ALT	(Italy) G Naso	6	5	3
(Spain) P Santos	2	1
(Slovenia) B Kavčič	6	6

Quarterfinals
1/WC	(Spain) R Ramírez Hidalgo	5	6	7
(France) S Robert	7	0	6^{4}
(Italy) M Crugnola	5	5
(Slovenia) B Kavčič	7	7

Semifinals
1/WC	(Spain) R Ramírez Hidalgo	0	5
(Slovenia) B Kavčič	6	7

=== Bottom half ===
First round
6	(Colombia) A Falla	7	6
(Brazil) C Zampieri	5	1
(Italy) S Galvani	2	2
Q	(Japan) T Ito	6	6
(Romania) A Ungur	4	4
Q	(Colombia) JS Cabal	6	6
(Italy) A Stoppini	6^{3}	6	2
3	(Brazil) R Hocevar	7	4	6
8	(Spain) D Muñoz-de la Nava	6	6
WC	(Italy) S Vagnozzi	1	3
(Italy) G Petrazzuolo	1	3
Q	(Spain) JA Sánchez-de Luna	6	6
(Austria) A Haider-Maurer	3	6	6^{3}
(United States) S Jenkins	6	2	7
(Argentina) M Alund	3	2
2	(United States) J Levine	6	6

Second round
6	(Colombia) A Falla	6	6
Q	(Italy) T Ito	0	3
Q	(Colombia) JS Cabal	7	5	6^{5}
3	(Brazil) R Hocevar	5	7	7
8	(Spain) D Muñoz-de la Nava	3	6	6
Q	(Spain) JA Sánchez-de Luna	6	4	4
(United States) S Jenkins	6	6^{4}	2
2	(United States) J Levine	1	7	6

Quarterfinals
6	(Colombia) A Falla	6	6
3	(Brazil) R Hocevar	0	0
8	(Spain) D Muñoz-de la Nava	4	6	4
2	(United States) J Levine	6	4	6

Semifinals
6	(Colombia) A Falla	2	3
2	(United States) J Levine	6	6
