= 2010 Morocco Tennis Tour – Tanger – Singles =

Tanger – Singles
- 2010 Morocco Tennis Tour – Tanger

Final
- Champion: (France) Stéphane Robert
- Runner-up: (Ukraine) Oleksandr Dolgopolov Jr.
- Score: 7–6^{(7–5)}, 6–4

Events
Singles	Doubles
← 2009 ·	Morocco Tennis Tour – Tanger	· 2013 →

Marc López was the defending champion, but he chose to not participate this year.
Stéphane Robert won in the final 7–6^{(7–5)}, 6–4, against Oleksandr Dolgopolov Jr.

== Seeds ==
1. (France) Stéphane Robert (champion)
2. (Belgium) Steve Darcis (quarterfinals)
3. (Slovenia) Blaž Kavčič (semifinals)
4. (Ukraine) Oleksandr Dolgopolov Jr. (final)
5. (Spain) Pere Riba (second round)
6. (Portugal) Rui Machado (quarterfinals)
7. (Spain) Iván Navarro (first round)
8. (Spain) David Marrero (second round)

== Draw ==
=== Key ===
- Q = Qualifier
- WC = Wild card
- LL = Lucky loser
- Alt = Alternate
- SE = Special exempt
- PR = Protected ranking
- ITF = ITF entry
- JE = Junior exempt
- w/o = Walkover
- r = Retired
- d = Defaulted
- SR = Special ranking

=== Finals ===
Semifinals
1	(France) Stéphane Robert	6	7
3	(Slovenia) Blaž Kavčič	0	5
4	(Ukraine) Oleksandr Dolgopolov Jr.	6	7
(Algeria) Lamine Ouahab	2	5

Final
1	(France) Stéphane Robert	7	6
4	(Ukraine) Oleksandr Dolgopolov Jr.	6^{5}	4

=== Top half ===
First round
1	(France) S Robert	6	6
WC	(Morocco) R El Amrani	3	3
(Spain) A Ramos Viñolas	3	4
Q	(Italy) F Aldi	6	6
(Italy) A di Mauro	7	2	6
(Croatia) A Veić	5	6	4
(Germany) D Meffert	3	4
6	(Portugal) R Machado	6	6
3	(Slovenia) B Kavčič	6	6
WC	(Morocco) Y Idmbarek	1	3
(Italy) A Arnaboldi	3	4
LL	(Tunisia) M Jaziri	6	6
(Slovakia) P Červenák	6^{3}	1
(Slovakia) M Kližan	7	6
Q	(Germany) B Knittel	2	6	3
8	(Spain) D Marrero	6	1	6

Second round
1	(France) S Robert	4	6	6
Q	(Italy) F Aldi	6	4	1
(Italy) A di Mauro	3	2
6	(Portugal) R Machado	6	6
3	(Slovenia) B Kavčič	2	6	7
LL	(Tunisia) M Jaziri	6	0	6^{4}
(Slovakia) M Kližan	6	5	7
8	(Spain) D Marrero	4	7	5

Quarterfinals
1	(France) S Robert	6	6
6	(Portugal) R Machado	1	4
3	(Slovenia) B Kavčič	7	7
(Slovakia) M Kližan	5	5

Semifinals
1	(France) S Robert	6	7
3	(Slovenia) B Kavčič	0	5

=== Bottom half ===
First round
7	(Spain) I Navarro	5	6	3
(Italy) A Brizzi	7	2	6
(Czech Republic) D Lojda	7	6
(Spain) I Cervantes Huegun	5	3
WC	(Morocco) H Khaddari	2	6	4
(Belarus) U Ignatik	6	3	6
WC	(Morocco) M Ziadi	1	6	2
4	(Ukraine) O Dolgopolov Jr.	6	3	6
5	(Spain) P Riba	6	6	6
Q	(Spain) F Vicente	1	7	1
(Austria) A Haider-Maurer	3	2
(Algeria) L Ouahab	6	6
(Spain) D Muñoz de la Nava	1	6^{5}
(Italy) S Vagnozzi	6	7
Q	(Portugal) P Sousa	2	2
2	(Belgium) S Darcis	6	6

Second round
(Italy) A Brizzi	5	5
(Czech Republic) D Lojda	7	7
(Belarus) U Ignatik	2	3
4	(Ukraine) O Dolgopolov Jr.	6	6
5	(Spain) P Riba	6	4	2
(Algeria) L Ouahab	4	6	6
(Italy) S Vagnozzi	4	1
2	(Belgium) S Darcis	6	6

Quarterfinals
(Czech Republic) D Lojda	4	3
4	(Ukraine) O Dolgopolov Jr.	6	6
(Algeria) L Ouahab	3	6	6
2	(Belgium) S Darcis	6	2	3

Semifinals
4	(Ukraine) O Dolgopolov Jr.	6	7
(Algeria) L Ouahab	2	5
