= 2011 Alessandria Challenger – Doubles =

Doubles
- 2011 Alessandria Challenger

Final
- Champions: (Austria) Martin Fischer (Austria) Philipp Oswald
- Runners-up: (South Africa) Jeff Coetzee (Sweden) Andreas Siljeström
- Score: 6–7(5), 7–5, [10–6]

Events
Singles	Doubles
← 2010 ·	Alessandria Challenger	· 2012 →

Ivan Dodig and Lovro Zovko were the defending champions but Dodig not to participate.
As a result, Zovko partnered up with Adrian Ungur, but they lost to Sadik Kadir and Purav Raja 2–6, 3–6 in the first round.
Martin Fischer and Philipp Oswald defeated Jeff Coetzee and Andreas Siljeström 6–7(5), 7–5, [10–6] in the final to win the tournament.

== Seeds ==
1. (Thailand) Sanchai Ratiwatana / (Thailand) Sonchat Ratiwatana (first round)
2. (Germany) Martin Emmrich / (Austria) Martin Slanar (first round)
3. (Australia) Jordan Kerr / (Czech Republic) David Škoch (first round)
4. (Australia) Sadik Kadir / (India) Purav Raja (quarterfinals)

== Draw ==
=== Key ===
- Q = Qualifier
- WC = Wild card
- LL = Lucky loser
- Alt = Alternate
- SE = Special exempt
- PR = Protected ranking
- ITF = ITF entry
- JE = Junior exempt
- w/o = Walkover
- r = Retired
- d = Defaulted
- SR = Special ranking

=== Draw ===
First round
1	(Thailand) Sa Ratiwatana (Thailand) So Ratiwatana	6^{5}	4
(South Africa) J Coetzee (Sweden) A Siljeström	7	6
(Brazil) R Dutra da Silva (Brazil) J Souza	6	3	[10]
(Argentina) F Bagnis (Argentina) JP Brzezicki	4	6	[7]
4	(Australia) S Kadir (India) P Raja	6	6
(Romania) A Ungur (Croatia) L Zovko	3	2
(Australia) P Luczak (Italy) A Motti	6^{8}	3
(Argentina) D Junqueira (Argentina) A Molteni	7	6
WC	(Italy) Pietro Ansaldo (Denmark) F Nielsen	4	4
(Austria) M Fischer (Austria) P Oswald	6	6
(Chile) P Capdeville (Brazil) J Silva	6	6
3	(Australia) J Kerr (Czech Republic) D Škoch	1	4
WC	(Italy) F Aldi (Italy) D Giorgini	5	2
(Italy) A di Mauro (Italy) P Lorenzi	7	6
WC	(Italy) A Giannessi (Italy) M Trevisan	4	6	[10]
2	(Germany) M Emmrich (Austria) M Slanar	6	2	[3]

Quarterfinals
(South Africa) J Coetzee (Sweden) A Siljeström	6	6
(Brazil) R Dutra da Silva (Brazil) J Souza	4	2
4	(Australia) S Kadir (India) P Raja	2	3
(Argentina) D Junqueira (Argentina) A Molteni	6	6
(Austria) M Fischer (Austria) P Oswald	6	6
(Chile) P Capdeville (Brazil) J Silva	2	1
(Italy) A di Mauro (Italy) P Lorenzi	6	3	[7]
WC	(Italy) A Giannessi (Italy) M Trevisan	2	6	[10]

Semifinals
(South Africa) J Coetzee (Sweden) A Siljeström	6	7
(Argentina) D Junqueira (Argentina) A Molteni	4	6^{5}
(Austria) M Fischer (Austria) P Oswald	6	4	[15]
WC	(Italy) A Giannessi (Italy) M Trevisan	1	6	[13]

Final
(South Africa) J Coetzee (Sweden) A Siljeström	7	5	[6]
(Austria) M Fischer (Austria) P Oswald	6^{5}	7	[10]
