= 2009 Morocco Tennis Tour – Tanger – Singles =

Tanger – Singles
- 2009 Morocco Tennis Tour – Tanger

Final
- Champion: (Spain) Marc López
- Runner-up: (Spain) Pere Riba
- Score: 5–7, 6–4, 7–6^{(11–9)}

Events
Singles	Doubles
← 2008 ·	Morocco Tennis Tour – Tanger	· 2010 →

Marcel Granollers was the defending champion.
Marc López defeated 5–7, 6–4, 7–6^{(11–9)} Pere Riba in the final.

== Seeds ==
1. (Czech Republic) Jiří Vaněk (second round)
2. (Portugal) Rui Machado (first round)
3. (Spain) Pere Riba (final)
4. (Australia) Peter Luczak (quarterfinals)
5. (Algeria) Lamine Ouahab (quarterfinals)
6. (France) Éric Prodon (first round)
7. (Spain) Fernando Vicente (first round)
8. (Italy) Giancarlo Petrazzuolo (second round)

== Draw ==
=== Key ===
- Q = Qualifier
- WC = Wild card
- LL = Lucky loser
- Alt = Alternate
- ITF = ITF entry
- PR = Protected ranking
- SR = Special ranking
- SE = Special exempt
- JE = Junior exempt
- JR = Junior Accelerator Programme entrant
- CO = College Accelerator Programme entrant
- NG = Next Gen Accelerator Program entrant
- w/o = Walkover
- r = Retired
- d = Defaulted

=== Final four ===
Semifinals
(Italy) Alberto Brizzi	7	1	3
3	(Spain) Pere Riba	5	6	6
Q	(Argentina) Leandro Migani	5	6	4
(Spain) Marc López	7	1	6

Final
3	(Spain) Pere Riba	7	4	6^{9}
(Spain) Marc López	5	6	7^{11}

=== Top half ===
First round
1	(Czech Republic) J Vaněk	6	6
(Germany) A Flock	0	3
(Belgium) Y Mertens	3	2
(Romania) G Moraru	6	6
(Italy) A Brizzi	7	6
(Austria) R Eitzinger	5	4
WC	(Morocco) R Chaki	7^{9}	4	6
7	(Spain) F Vicente	6^{7}	6	2
3	(Spain) P Riba	7^{7}	6
WC	(Morocco) M Ziadi	6^{5}	0
(Slovakia) P Červenák	6	6
WC	(Morocco) Y Rachidi	4	3
(Argentina) M Alund	3	3
WC	(Morocco) T Ouahabi	6	6
(Spain) M Fornell	5	6	1
5	(Algeria) L Ouahab	7	2	6

Second round
1	(Czech Republic) J Vaněk	7	1	5
(Romania) G Moraru	5	6	7
(Italy) A Brizzi	6	7^{7}
WC	(Morocco) R Chaki	1	6^{5}
3	(Spain) P Riba	4	6	7
(Slovakia) P Červenák	6	4	5
WC	(Morocco) T Ouahabi	3	4
5	(Algeria) L Ouahab	6	6

Quarterfinals
(Romania) G Moraru	6	5	3
(Italy) A Brizzi	4	7	6
3	(Spain) P Riba	7^{7}	6
5	(Algeria) L Ouahab	6^{5}	1

Semifinals
(Italy) A Brizzi	7	1	5
3	(Spain) P Riba	5	6	7

=== Bottom half ===
First round
6	(France) É Prodon	6	5	6^{6}
(Italy) S Vagnozzi	1	7	7^{8}
Q	(Argentina) L Migani	6	6
(Republic of Ireland) C Niland	4	2
Q	(Spain) JA Sánchez de Luna	3	3
(Monaco) J-R Lisnard	6	6
(Spain) C Poch-Gradin	4	6	3
4	(Australia) P Luczak	6	3	6
8	(Italy) G Petrazzuolo	6	6
(Latvia) D Pavlovs	3	1
Q	(France) A Gensse	1	0
(Spain) M López	6	6
(Slovakia) K Čapkovič	2	7	6
(Czech Republic) J Pospíšil	6	5	3
Q	(Tunisia) M Jaziri	6	4	7
2	(Portugal) R Machado	3	6	5

Second round
(Italy) S Vagnozzi	4	2
Q	(Argentina) L Migani	6	6
(Monaco) J-R Lisnard	1	6^{4}
4	(Australia) P Luczak	6	7^{7}
8	(Italy) G Petrazzuolo	6	1	1
(Spain) M López	4	6	6
(Slovakia) K Čapkovič	6	4	3
Q	(Tunisia) M Jaziri	1	6	6

Quarterfinals
Q	(Argentina) L Migani	6	6
4	(Australia) P Luczak	3	3
(Spain) M López	6	6
Q	(Tunisia) M Jaziri	0	0

Semifinals
Q	(Argentina) L Migani	5	6	4
(Spain) M López	7	1	6
