= 2009 Morocco Tennis Tour – Tanger – Doubles =

Tanger – Doubles
- 2009 Morocco Tennis Tour – Tanger

Final
- Champions: (France) Augustin Gensse; (France) Éric Prodon
- Runners-up: (Belarus) Uladzimir Ignatik; (Slovakia) Martin Kližan
- Score: 6–1, 7–6^{(7–3)}

Events
Singles	Doubles
- Morocco Tennis Tour – Tanger

Miguel Ángel López Jaén and Iván Navarro were the defending champions, but they chose to not participate.
Augustin Gensse and Éric Prodon won in the final 6–1, 7–6^{(7–3)} against Giancarlo Petrazzuolo and Simone Vagnozzi.

== Seeds ==
1. (France) Olivier Charroin / (France) Nicolas Tourte (withdrew)
2. (Spain) Marc Fornell Mestres / (Spain) Carles Poch Gradin (first round)
3. (Italy) Giancarlo Petrazzuolo / (Italy) Simone Vagnozzi (final)
4. (Spain) Marc López / (Algeria) Lamine Ouahab (quarterfinals)

== Draw ==
Key

- Q = Qualifier
- WC = Wild card
- LL = Lucky loser
- Alt = Alternate
- ITF = ITF entry
- PR = Protected ranking
- SR = Special ranking
- SE = Special exempt
- JE = Junior exempt
- JR = Junior Accelerator Programme entrant
- CO = College Accelerator Programme entrant
- NG = Next Gen Accelerator Program entrant
- w/o = Walkover
- r = Retired
- d = Defaulted

=== Draw ===
First round

Quarterfinals

Semifinals

Final

Alt
- (Spain) S Gutiérrez Ferrol
- (Spain) JA Sánchez de Luna
5
1

WC
- (Morocco) Y Idmbarek
- (Morocco) T Ouahabi
7
6

WC
- (Morocco) Y Idmbarek
- (Morocco) T Ouahabi
5
2

- (Argentina) M Alund
- (Brazil) M Demoliner
6^{2}
3

- (France) A Gensse
- (France) É Prodon
7
6

- (France) A Gensse
- (France) É Prodon
7^{7}
6

- (France) A Gensse
- (France) É Prodon
6
6

4
- (Spain) M López
- (Algeria) L Ouahab
6
6

- (Czech Republic) L Friedl
- (Czech Republic) J Vaněk
2
4

- (Republic of Ireland) C Niland
- (Netherlands) B Westerhof
2
0

4
- (Spain) M López
- (Algeria) L Ouahab
2
3

WC
- (Morocco) M Saber
- (Morocco) M Ziadi
4
4

- (Czech Republic) L Friedl
- (Czech Republic) J Vaněk
6
6

- (Czech Republic) L Friedl
- (Czech Republic) J Vaněk
6
6

- (France) A Gensse
- (France) É Prodon
6
7^{7}

- (Portugal) R Machado
- (Czech Republic) J Pospíšil
4
3

3
- (Italy) G Petrazzuolo
- (Italy) S Vagnozzi
1
6^{3}

- (Romania) V Crivoi
- (Romania) G Moraru
6
6

- (Romania) V Crivoi
- (Romania) G Moraru
6^{5}
3

Alt
- (Slovakia) K Čapkovič
- (Slovakia) P Červenák
4
1

3
- (Italy) G Petrazzuolo
- (Italy) S Vagnozzi
7^{7}
6

3
- (Italy) G Petrazzuolo
- (Italy) S Vagnozzi
6
6

3
- (Italy) G Petrazzuolo
- (Italy) S Vagnozzi
7
6

- (Spain) Í Cervantes
- (Spain) F Vicente
5
2

- (Austria) R Eitzinger
- (Latvia) D Pavlovs
5
0

- (Germany) Alexander Flock
- (Greece) A Jakupovic
7
6

- (Germany) A Flock
- (Greece) A Jakupovic
4
4

- (Austria) R Eitzinger
- (Latvia) D Pavlovs
6
6

- (Austria) R Eitzinger
- (Latvia) D Pavlovs
6
6

2
- (Spain) M Fornell Mestres
- (Spain) C Poch Gradin
4
4
