= 2007 Grand Prix Hassan II – Doubles =

Tennis tournament

Doubles
- 2007 Grand Prix Hassan II

Final
- Champions: (Australia) Jordan Kerr (Czech Republic) David Škoch
- Runners-up: (Poland) Łukasz Kubot (Austria) Oliver Marach
- Score: 7–6^{(7–4)}, 1–6, [10–4]

Events
Singles	Doubles
← 2006 ·	Grand Prix Hassan II	· 2008 →

Julian Knowle and Jürgen Melzer were the defending champions, but did not participate this year.

Jordan Kerr and David Škoch won in the final 7–6^{(7–4)}, 1–6, [10–4], against Łukasz Kubot and Oliver Marach.

== Seeds ==
1. (France) Arnaud Clément / (France) Michaël Llodra (semifinals)
2. (Argentina) Martín García / (Argentina) Sebastián Prieto (first round)
3. (France) Julien Benneteau / (France) Nicolas Mahut (quarterfinals)
4. (Poland) Łukasz Kubot / (Austria) Oliver Marach (final)

== Draw ==
=== Key ===
- Q = Qualifier
- WC = Wild card
- LL = Lucky loser
- Alt = Alternate
- SE = Special exempt
- PR = Protected ranking
- ITF = ITF entry
- JE = Junior exempt
- w/o = Walkover
- r = Retired
- d = Defaulted
- SR = Special ranking

=== Draw ===
First round
1	(France) A Clément (France) M Llodra	7^{7}	6
(Slovakia) D Hrbatý (Slovakia) M Mertiňák	6^{4}	4
(Spain) A Montañés (France) G Simon	7^{7}	7^{7}
(France) M Gicquel (France) F Serra	6^{1}	6^{2}
4	(Poland) Ł Kubot (Austria) O Marach	6	3	[10]
WC	(Morocco) M El Aarej (Spain) S Ventura	1	6	[7]
(Czech Republic) T Cibulec (Czech Republic) L Friedl	3	6	[5]
(United Kingdom) J Auckland (Australia) S Huss	6	3	[10]
(France) S Grosjean (France) P-H Mathieu	2	6	[8]
(Australia) J Kerr (Czech Republic) D Škoch	6	4	[10]
(Spain) R Ramírez Hidalgo (Argentina) S Roitman	1	4
3	(France) J Benneteau (France) N Mahut	6	6
(Germany) T Behrend (Netherlands) R Wassen	6	6
WC	(Morocco) R Chaki (Morocco) A El Alaoui	1	1
(Austria) A Peya (Argentina) M Vassallo Argüello	6	3	[10]
2	(Argentina) M García (Argentina) S Prieto	0	6	[6]

Quarterfinals
1	(France) A Clément (France) M Llodra	6	6
(Spain) A Montañés (France) G Simon	1	4
4	(Poland) Ł Kubot (Austria) O Marach	7^{7}	6
(United Kingdom) J Auckland (Australia) S Huss	6^{2}	3
(Australia) J Kerr (Czech Republic) D Škoch	6	6
3	(France) J Benneteau (France) N Mahut	3	4
(Germany) T Behrend (Netherlands) R Wassen	2	2
(Austria) A Peya (Argentina) M Vassallo Argüello	6	6

Semifinals
1	(France) A Clément (France) M Llodra	2	1
4	(Poland) Ł Kubot (Austria) O Marach	6	6
(Australia) J Kerr (Czech Republic) D Škoch	7^{7}	6
(Austria) A Peya (Argentina) M Vassallo Argüello	6^{5}	4

Final
4	(Poland) Ł Kubot (Austria) O Marach	6^{4}	6	[4]
(Australia) J Kerr (Czech Republic) D Škoch	7^{7}	1	[10]
