= 2013 Morocco Tennis Tour – Tanger – Singles =

Tanger – Singles
- 2013 Morocco Tennis Tour – Tanger

Final
- Champion: (Spain) Pablo Carreño Busta
- Runner-up: (Kazakhstan) Mikhail Kukushkin
- Score: 6–2, 4–1 ret

Events
Singles	Doubles
← 2010 ·	Morocco Tennis Tour – Tanger

Stéphane Robert was the defending champion from 2010 as there was no event in 2011 and 2012, but decided not to participate.

Pablo Carreño Busta won the final against Mikhail Kukushkin 6–2, 4–1 ret.

== Seeds ==
1. (Spain) Rubén Ramírez Hidalgo (quarterfinals)
2. (Spain) Pablo Carreño Busta (champion)
3. (Austria) Gerald Melzer (quarterfinals)
4. (Portugal) Pedro Sousa (first round)
5. (Spain) Marc Giner (first round)
6. (Spain) Gerard Granollers (first round)
7. (Spain) José Checa Calvo (first round)
8. (United States) Tennys Sandgren (first round)

== Draw ==
=== Key ===
- Q = Qualifier
- WC = Wild card
- LL = Lucky loser
- Alt = Alternate
- SE = Special exempt
- PR = Protected ranking
- ITF = ITF entry
- JE = Junior exempt
- w/o = Walkover
- r = Retired
- d = Defaulted
- SR = Special ranking

=== Finals ===
Semifinals
(Kazakhstan) Mikhail Kukushkin	6	6
(Slovakia) Adrian Sikora	3	1
Q	(Italy) Lorenzo Giustino	4	6	3
2	(Spain) Pablo Carreño Busta	6	3	6

Final
(Kazakhstan) Mikhail Kukushkin	2	1^{r}
2	(Spain) Pablo Carreño Busta	6	4

=== Top half ===
First round
1	(Spain) R Ramírez Hidalgo	4	7^{9}	6
Q	(Egypt) S Sabry	6	6^{7}	2
WC	(Morocco) Y Idmbarek	4	4
Q	(Algeria) L Ouahab	6	6
LL	(Sweden) I Arvidsson	6^{4}	6^{6}
(Serbia) N Ćirić	7^{7}	7^{8}
(Kazakhstan) M Kukushkin	6	6
5	(Spain) Marc Giner	2	0
4	(Portugal) P Sousa	2	6	3
WC	(Morocco) R El Amrani	6	4	6
(France) G Burquier	7	6
(Egypt) M Safwat	5	2
WC	(Morocco) Y Rachidi	1	2
(Venezuela) D Souto	6	6
(Slovakia) Adrian Sikora	2	6	6
7	(Spain) J Checa Calvo	6	3	0

Second round
1	(Spain) R Ramírez Hidalgo	6	5	6
Q	(Algeria) L Ouahab	3	7	3
(Serbia) N Ćirić	4	4
(Kazakhstan) M Kukushkin	6	6
WC	(Morocco) R El Amrani	6^{3}	2^{r}
(France) G Burquier	7^{7}	4
(Venezuela) D Souto	1^{r}
(Slovakia) A Sikora	4

Quarterfinals
1	(Spain) R Ramírez Hidalgo	5	3
(Kazakhstan) M Kukushkin	7	6
(France) G Burquier	4	5
(Slovakia) A Sikora	6	7

Semifinals
(Kazakhstan) M Kukushkin	6	6
(Slovakia) A Sikora	3	1

=== Bottom half ===
First round
6	(Spain) G Granollers	7^{7}	4	4
WC	(Morocco) H Khaddari	6^{3}	6	6
(Italy) A Brizzi	3	5
Q	(Italy) L Giustino	6	7
(Belgium) G Gigounon	6	0	3
(Belgium) Y Reuter	3	6	6
(Austria) M Neuchrist	4	3
3	(Austria) G Melzer	6	6
8	(United States) T Sandgren	5	6	4
(Spain) R Carballés Baena	7	4	6
Q	(France) T Lamasine	4	4
(Croatia) M Pavić	6	6
(Italy) T Fabbiano	1	2
(Switzerland) M Lammer	6	6
(France) A Michon	4	1
2	(Spain) P Carreño Busta	6	6

Second round
WC	(Morocco) H Khaddari	6^{8}	0
Q	(Italy) L Giustino	7^{10}	6
(Belgium) Y Reuter	4	1
3	(Austria) G Melzer	6	6
(Spain) R Carballés Baena	4	6	6
(Croatia) M Pavić	6	3	4
(Switzerland) M Lammer	7^{7}	4	2
2	(Spain) P Carreño Busta	6^{3}	6	6

Quarterfinals
Q	(Italy) L Giustino	6	6^{7}	6
3	(Austria) G Melzer	4	7^{9}	2
(Spain) R Carballés Baena	6	1	5
2	(Spain) P Carreño Busta	2	6	7

Semifinals
Q	(Italy) L Giustino	4	6	3
2	(Spain) P Carreño Busta	6	3	6
