= 2008 Grand Prix Hassan II – Doubles =

Doubles
- 2008 Grand Prix Hassan II

Final
- Champions: (Spain) Albert Montañés (Spain) Santiago Ventura
- Runners-up: (United States) James Cerretani (Australia) Todd Perry
- Score: 6–1, 6–2

Events
Singles	Doubles
← 2007 ·	Grand Prix Hassan II	· 2009 →

Jordan Kerr and David Škoch were the defending champions. They were both present but did not compete together.
Kerr partnered with František Čermák, but lost in the first round to Guillermo Coria and Jean-Julien Rojer.
Skoch partnered with Jaroslav Levinský, but lost in the quarterfinals to Florian Mayer and Rainer Schüttler.

Albert Montañés and Santiago Ventura won in the final 6–1, 6–2, against James Cerretani and Todd Perry.

== Seeds ==
1. (Czech Republic) František Čermák / (Australia) Jordan Kerr (first round)
2. (Argentina) Agustín Calleri / (Uruguay) Pablo Cuevas (semifinals)
3. (Czech Republic) Jaroslav Levinský / (Czech Republic) David Škoch (quarterfinals)
4. (Switzerland) Yves Allegro / (Romania) Horia Tecău (first round)

== Draw ==
=== Key ===
- Q = Qualifier
- WC = Wild card
- LL = Lucky loser
- Alt = Alternate
- SE = Special exempt
- PR = Protected ranking
- ITF = ITF entry
- JE = Junior exempt
- w/o = Walkover
- r = Retired
- d = Defaulted
- SR = Special ranking

=== Draw ===
First round
1	(Czech Republic) F Čermák (Australia) J Kerr	6	3	[7]
WC	(Argentina) G Coria (Netherlands Antilles) J-J Rojer	3	6	[10]
(United States) J Cerretani (Australia) T Perry	7	6
(Spain) G García López (Spain) Ó Hernández	5	2
3	(Czech Republic) J Levinský (Czech Republic) D Škoch	6	6
(Sweden) J Brunström (Australia) C Guccione	4	2
(Slovakia) D Hrbatý (United States) J Thomas	3	6^{6}
(Germany) F Mayer (Germany) R Schüttler	6	7^{8}
(Spain) Montañés (Spain) S Ventura	6	6
ALT	(Argentina) M Hood (Serbia) B Pašanski	4	4
(Brazil) M Daniel (Brazil) B Soares	1	7	[10]
4	(Switzerland) Y Allegro (Romania) H Tecău	6	5	[7]
WC	(Morocco) M Saber (Morocco) M Ziadi	6	1	[10]
(Germany) B Becker (Czech Republic) T Cibulec	4	6	[8]
(Australia) S Huss (United Kingdom) R Hutchins	6	3	[4]
2	(Argentina) A Calleri (Uruguay) P Cuevas	3	6	[10]

Quarterfinals
WC	(Argentina) G Coria (Netherlands Antilles) J-J Rojer	4	6^{3}
(United States) J Cerretani (Australia) T Perry	6	7^{7}
3	(Czech Republic) J Levinský (Czech Republic) D Škoch	6^{5}	2
(Germany) F Mayer (Germany) R Schüttler	7^{7}	6
(Spain) Montañés (Spain) S Ventura	6	7
(Brazil) M Daniel (Brazil) B Soares	4	5
WC	(Morocco) M Saber (Morocco) M Ziadi	6^{1}	5
2	(Argentina) A Calleri (Uruguay) P Cuevas	7^{7}	7

Semifinals
(United States) J Cerretani (Australia) T Perry	6	6
(Germany) F Mayer (Germany) R Schüttler	3	2
(Spain) Montañés (Spain) S Ventura	6	6
2	(Argentina) A Calleri (Uruguay) P Cuevas	3	4

Final
(United States) J Cerretani (Australia) T Perry	1	2
(Spain) Montañés (Spain) S Ventura	6	6
