= 2009 Alessandria Challenger =

- Date: May 25 – May 31
- Edition: 2nd
- Location: Alessandria, Italy

Champions

Singles
- (Slovenia) Blaž Kavčič

Doubles
- (Spain) Rubén Ramírez Hidalgo / (Spain) José Antonio Sánchez de Luna
← 2008 ·	Alessandria Challenger	· 2010 →

The 2009 Alessandria Challenger (known as 2009 Trofeo Cassa di Risparmio di Alessandria) was a professional tennis tournament played on outdoor red clay courts. It was part of the 2009 ATP Challenger Tour. It took place in Alessandria, Italy between May 25–31, 2009.

== Singles entrants ==
=== Seeds ===
Nationality	Player	Ranking*	Seeding
ESP	Rubén Ramírez Hidalgo	131	1
USA	Jesse Levine	142	2
BRA	Ricardo Hocevar	159	3
ESP	David Marrero	166	4
ECU	Giovanni Lapentti	172	5
COL	Alejandro Falla	173	6
ITA	Paolo Lorenzi	174	7
ESP	Daniel Muñoz de la Nava	175	8

- Rankings are as of May 18, 2009.

=== Other entrants ===
The following players received wildcards into the singles main draw:

- (Lithuania) Laurynas Grigelis
- (Italy) Jacopo Marchegiani
- (Spain) Rubén Ramírez Hidalgo
- (Italy) Simone Vagnozzi

The following players received entry from the qualifying draw:

- (Italy) Francesco Aldi
- (Colombia) Juan Sebastián Cabal
- (Japan) Tatsuma Ito
- (Spain) José Antonio Sánchez de Luna

== Champions ==
=== Men's singles ===
(Slovenia) Blaž Kavčič def. (United States) Jesse Levine, 7–5, 6–3

=== Men's doubles ===
(Spain) Rubén Ramírez Hidalgo / (Spain) José Antonio Sánchez de Luna def. (Argentina) Martín Alund / (Chile) Guillermo Hormazábal, 6–4, 6–2
