= 2013 Morocco Tennis Tour – Tanger – Doubles =

Tanger – Doubles
- 2013 Morocco Tennis Tour – Tanger

Final
- Champions: (Serbia) Nikola Ćirić; (Serbia) Goran Tošić
- Runners-up: (Austria) Maximilian Neuchrist; (Croatia) Mate Pavić
- Score: 6–3, 6–7^{(5–7)}, [10–8]

Events
Singles	Doubles
← 2010 ·	Morocco Tennis Tour – Tanger

Steve Darcis and Dominik Meffert were the defending champions from 2010 as there was no event in 2011 and 2012, but decided no to participate.

Nikola Ćirić and Goran Tošić won the final against Maximilian Neuchrist and Mate Pavić 6–3, 6–7^{(5–7)}, [10–8].

== Seeds ==
1. (Austria) Gerald Melzer / (United States) Tennys Sandgren (semifinals)
2. (Serbia) Nikola Ćirić / (Serbia) Goran Tošić (champions)
3. (United States) Vahid Mirzadeh / (United States) Denis Zivkovic (quarterfinals)
4. (Uruguay) Ariel Behar / (New Zealand) Artem Sitak (semifinals)

== Draw ==
=== Key ===
- Q = Qualifier
- WC = Wild card
- LL = Lucky loser
- Alt = Alternate
- SE = Special exempt
- PR = Protected ranking
- ITF = ITF entry
- JE = Junior exempt
- w/o = Walkover
- r = Retired
- d = Defaulted
- SR = Special ranking

=== Draw ===
First round

Quarterfinals

Semifinals

Final

1
- (Austria) G Melzer
- (United States) T Sandgren
3
6
[10]

- (France) G Burquier
- (Spain) A Vivanco-Guzmán
6
3
[3]

1
- (Austria) G Melzer
- (United States) T Sandgren
6
7^{8}

WC
- (Morocco) Y Idmbarek
- (Morocco) Y Rachidi
3
1

- (Spain) C Poch-Gradin
- (United Kingdom) D Walsh
3
6^{6}

- (Spain) C Poch-Gradin
- (United Kingdom) D Walsh
6
6

1
- (Austria) G Melzer
- (United States) T Sandgren
3
0

3
- (United States) V Mirzadeh
- (Croatia) D Zivkovic
0
6
[10]

- (Austria) M Neuchrist
- (Croatia) M Pavić
6
6

- (Germany) G Kretschmer
- (Germany) A Satschko
6
3
[4]

3
- (United States) V Mirzadeh
- (Croatia) D Zivkovic
3
3

Alt
- (Egypt) S Sabry
- (Egypt) M Safwat
2
1

- (Austria) M Neuchrist
- (Croatia) M Pavić
6
6

- (Austria) M Neuchrist
- (Croatia) M Pavić
6
6

- (Austria) M Neuchrist
- (Croatia) M Pavić
3
7^{7}
[8]

WC
(Morocco) Ayoub Chekrouni
(Morocco) Soufiani Sahli
1
0

3
- (Serbia) N Ćirić
- (Serbia) G Tošić
6
6^{5}
[10]

WC
- (Morocco) R El Amrani
- (Algeria) L Ouahab
6
6

WC
- (Morocco) R El Amrani
- (Algeria) L Ouahab
w/o

- (Italy) L Giustino
- (Belgium) Y Reuter
7^{7}
5
[6]

4
- (Uruguay) A Behar
- (New Zealand) A Sitak

4
- (Uruguay) A Behar
- (New Zealand) A Sitak
6^{4}
7
[10]

4
- (Uruguay) A Behar
- (New Zealand) A Sitak
3
6^{4}

- (Spain) Marc Giner
- (Venezuela) D Souto
6
6

- (Serbia) N Ćirić
- (Serbia) G Tošić
6
7^{7}

- (Spain) G Granollers
- (Switzerland) M Lammer
3
2

- (Spain) M Giner
- (Venezuela) D Souto
w/o

- (Italy) A Brizzi
- (Italy) T Fabbiano
3
4

- (Serbia) N Ćirić
- (Serbia) G Tošić

2
- (Serbia) N Ćirić
- (Serbia) G Tošić
6
6
