= 2011 Alessandria Challenger – Singles =

Singles
- 2011 Alessandria Challenger

Final
- Champion: (Spain) Pablo Carreño-Busta
- Runner-up: (Spain) Roberto Bautista-Agut
- Score: 3–6, 6–3, 7–5

Events
Singles	Doubles
← 2010 ·	Alessandria Challenger	· 2012 →

Björn Phau was the defending champion, but decided not to participate this year.
Pablo Carreño-Busta won the tournament after defeating Roberto Bautista-Agut 3–6, 6–3, 7–5 in the final.

== Seeds ==
1. (Argentina) Diego Junqueira (quarterfinals)
2. (Brazil) João Souza (first round)
3. (Italy) Paolo Lorenzi (second round)
4. (Austria) Martin Fischer (second round)
5. (Chile) Paul Capdeville (second round)
6. (Brazil) Rogério Dutra da Silva (first round)
7. (Italy) Alessio di Mauro (second round)
8. (Slovenia) Grega Žemlja (first round)

== Draw ==
=== Key ===
- Q = Qualifier
- WC = Wild card
- LL = Lucky loser
- Alt = Alternate
- ITF = ITF entry
- PR = Protected ranking
- SR = Special ranking
- SE = Special exempt
- JE = Junior exempt
- JR = Junior Accelerator Programme entrant
- CO = College Accelerator Programme entrant
- NG = Next Gen Accelerator Program entrant
- w/o = Walkover
- r = Retired
- d = Defaulted

=== Finals ===
Semifinals
(Spain) Roberto Bautista-Agut	4	7	6
(Argentina) Facundo Bagnis	6	5	3
SE	(Spain) Pablo Carreño-Busta	6	6
(Denmark) Frederik Nielsen	2	3

Final
(Spain) Roberto Bautista-Agut	6	3	5
SE	(Spain) Pablo Carreño-Busta	3	6	7

=== Top half ===
First round
1	(Argentina) D Junqueira	6^{5}	6	6
Q	(Canada) P Polansky	7	1	0
(Slovakia) A Martin	4	0^{r}
Q	(Kazakhstan) E Korolev	6	2
WC	(Italy) G Naso	6	6^{5}	2
(Spain) R Bautista-Agut	4	7	6
(Romania) A Ungur	7	6
6	(Brazil) R Dutra da Silva	6^{1}	3
4	(Austria) M Fischer	6	7
Q	(Spain) I Navarro	4	6^{4}
(Argentina) F Bagnis	3	6	6
Q	(United States) J Witten	6	4	3
(Kazakhstan) Y Schukin	6	0	5
Alt	(Belgium) R Bemelmans	2	6	7
(Switzerland) M Chiudinelli	3	6^{4}
7	(Italy) A di Mauro	6	7

Second round
1	(Argentina) D Junqueira	3	7	6
Q	(Kazakhstan) E Korolev	6	5	1
(Spain) R Bautista-Agut	6	6
(Romania) A Ungur	3	3
4	(Austria) M Fischer	1	3
(Argentina) F Bagnis	6	6
Alt	(Belgium) R Bemelmans	6	6
7	(Italy) A di Mauro	4	4

Quarterfinals
1	(Argentina) D Junqueira	6^{6}	2
(Spain) R Bautista-Agut	7	6
(Argentina) F Bagnis	7	6
Alt	(Belgium) R Bemelmans	6^{2}	1

Semifinals
(Spain) R Bautista-Agut	4	7	6
(Argentina) F Bagnis	6	5	3

=== Bottom half ===
First round
5	(Chile) P Capdeville	6	6
WC	(Ukraine) S Bubka	0	3
(United States) A Kuznetsov	4	1
(Argentina) JP Brzezicki	6	6
SE	(Spain) P Carreño-Busta	6	6
(Russia) K Kravchuk	1	2
(Argentina) A Molteni	4	3
3	(Italy) P Lorenzi	6	6
8	(Slovenia) G Žemlja	3	2
(Brazil) J Silva	6	6
(Australia) P Luczak	2	6	6
WC	(Italy) A Giannessi	6	4	4
(Denmark) F Nielsen	6	6
WC	(Italy) M Trevisan	3	3
(Italy) M Viola	7	3	6
2	(Brazil) J Souza	6^{8}	6	4

Second round
5	(Chile) P Capdeville	0	7	2
(Argentina) JP Brzezicki	6	6^{6}	6
SE	(Spain) P Carreño-Busta	7	6
3	(Italy) P Lorenzi	6^{9}	4
(Brazil) J Silva	6	5	4
(Australia) P Luczak	4	7	6
(Denmark) F Nielsen	6	7
(Italy) M Viola	4	5

Quarterfinals
(Argentina) JP Brzezicki	4	3
SE	(Spain) P Carreño-Busta	6	6
(Australia) P Luczak	6	4	1
(Denmark) F Nielsen	3	6	6

Semifinals
SE	(Spain) P Carreño-Busta	6	6
(Denmark) F Nielsen	2	3
