= 2009 Grand Prix Hassan II – Singles =

Singles
- 2009 Grand Prix Hassan II

Final
- Champion: (Spain) Juan Carlos Ferrero
- Runner-up: (France) Florent Serra
- Score: 6–4, 7–5

Events
| Singles | Doubles |
- Grand Prix Hassan II

Juan Carlos Ferrero defeated Florent Serra in 6–4, 7–5.

== Seeds ==
1. (Russia) Igor Andreev (semifinals)
2. (Germany) Rainer Schüttler (first round)
3. (Spain) Albert Montañés (semifinals)
4. (Romania) Victor Hănescu (quarterfinals)
5. (France) Florent Serra (final)
6. (France) Marc Gicquel (quarterfinals)
7. (Belgium) Christophe Rochus (first round)
8. (France) Arnaud Clément (first round)

== Draw ==
Key

- Q = Qualifier
- WC = Wild card
- LL = Lucky loser
- Alt = Alternate
- ITF = ITF entry
- PR = Protected ranking
- SR = Special ranking
- SE = Special exempt
- JE = Junior exempt
- JR = Junior Accelerator Programme entrant
- CO = College Accelerator Programme entrant
- NG = Next Gen Accelerator Program entrant
- w/o = Walkover
- r = Retired
- d = Defaulted

=== Finals ===
Semifinals
1 | (Russia) Igor Andreev | 6^{9} | 3
(Spain) Juan Carlos Ferrero | 7^{11} | 6
3 | (Spain) Albert Montañés | 4 | 4
5 | (France) Florent Serra | 6 | 6

Final
(Spain) Juan Carlos Ferrero | 6 | 7
5 | (France) Florent Serra | 4 | 5

=== Top half ===
First round
1 | (Russia) I Andreev | 3 | 6 | 7
WC | (Morocco) R Chaki | 6 | 3 | 5
(France) N Devilder | 6 | 6
(Austria) D Köllerer | 3 | 4
(Germany) M Zverev | 6 | 3 | 6
Q | (Italy) F Cipolla | 2 | 6 | 3
(Belgium) K Vliegen | 5 | 3
6 | (France) M Gicquel | 7 | 6
4 | (Romania) V Hănescu | 6 | 7
(Belgium) S Darcis | 4 | 5
(Spain) I Navarro | 7 | 4
(Ukraine) S Stakhovsky | 5 | 2^{r}
(Italy) P Starace | 4 | 6 | 6
(Spain) Ó Hernández | 6 | 3 | 3
(Spain) JC Ferrero | 6 | 6
7 | (Belgium) C Rochus | 2 | 3

Second round
1 | (Russia) I Andreev | 6^{11} | 7^{7} | 6
(France) N Devilder | 7^{13} | 6^{5} | 4
(Germany) M Zverev | 4 | 5
6 | (France) M Gicquel | 6 | 7
4 | (Romania) V Hănescu | 6 | 6
(Spain) I Navarro | 1 | 0
(Italy) P Starace | 4 | 6^{1}
(Spain) JC Ferrero | 6 | 7^{7}

Quarterfinals
1 | (Russia) I Andreev | 6 | 6
6 | (France) M Gicquel | 1 | 3
4 | (Romania) V Hănescu | 3 | 5
(Spain) JC Ferrero | 6 | 7

Semifinals
1 | (Russia) I Andreev | 6^{9} | 3
(Spain) JC Ferrero | 7^{11} | 6

=== Bottom half ===
First round
8 | (France) A Clément | 6^{6} | 7 | 4
(Croatia) I Ljubičić | 7^{8} | 5 | 6
(Spain) A Martín | 3 | 6 | 6^{4}
(Portugal) F Gil | 6 | 3 | 7^{7}
Q | (Austria) O Marach | 1 | 1
Q | (Spain) S Ventura | 6 | 6
WC | (Morocco) R El Amrani | 2 | 5
3 | (Spain) A Montañés | 6 | 7
5 | (France) F Serra | 6 | 6
(Brazil) T Bellucci | 3 | 3
WC | (Morocco) M Ziadi | 6 | 2 | 1
(Belgium) O Rochus | 4 | 6 | 6
(Italy) F Fognini | 2 | 1
(Russia) T Gabashvili | 6 | 6
Q | (Spain) R Ramírez Hidalgo | 6 | 7^{7}
2 | (Germany) R Schüttler | 4 | 6^{5}

Second round
(Croatia) I Ljubičić | 7^{7} | 5 | 4
(Portugal) F Gil | 6^{2} | 7 | 6
Q | (Spain) S Ventura | 7 | 3 | 5
3 | (Spain) A Montañés | 5 | 6 | 7
5 | (France) F Serra | 6 | 6
(Belgium) O Rochus | 3 | 3
(Russia) T Gabashvili | 6 | 6
Q | (Spain) R Ramírez Hidalgo | 4 | 4

Quarterfinals
(Portugal) F Gil | 6^{5} | 4
3 | (Spain) A Montañés | 7^{7} | 6
5 | (France) F Serra | 6 | 6
(Russia) T Gabashvili | 0 | 4

Semifinals
3 | (Spain) A Montañés | 4 | 4
5 | (France) F Serra | 6 | 6

== Qualifying ==
=== Seeds ===
1. (Italy) Flavio Cipolla (qualified)
2. (Spain) Rubén Ramírez Hidalgo (qualified)
3. (Spain) Santiago Ventura Bertomeu (qualified)
4. (France) Olivier Patience (qualifying competition)
5. (Morocco) Lamine Ouahab (qualifying competition, retired due to having the flu)
6. (Andorra) Laurent Recouderc (first round)
7. (Serbia) Boris Pašanski (qualifying competition)
8. (Poland) Łukasz Kubot (second round)

=== Qualifiers ===
1. (Italy) Flavio Cipolla
2. (Spain) Rubén Ramírez Hidalgo
3. (Spain) Santiago Ventura Bertomeu
4. (Austria) Oliver Marach

=== Draw ===
==== First qualifier ====
First round
(Czech Republic) David Škoch | 7 | 6
(Australia) Paul Hanley | 5 | 4
(Spain) Rafael Mazon Hernandez | 6 | 6
(Morocco) El Mehdi Wasfy | 2 | 3
(Portugal) Pedro Sousa | 7 | 1 | 6^{3}
5 | (Morocco) Lamine Ouahab | 5 | 6 | 7^{7}

Second round
1 | (Italy) Flavio Cipolla | 7^{7} | 6
(Czech Republic) David Škoch | 6^{3} | 2
(Spain) Rafael Mazon Hernandez | 2 | 1
5 | (Morocco) Lamine Ouahab | 6 | 6

Qualifying competition
1 | (Italy) Flavio Cipolla | 7^{11} | 4
5 | (Morocco) Lamine Ouahab | 6^{9} | 0^{r}

==== Second qualifier ====
First round
(Czech Republic) Leoš Friedl | 7^{8} | 1^{r}
(France) Jean-Christophe Faurel | 6^{6} | 2
(Spain) Sergio Gutiérrez Ferrol | 6 | 6
(Spain) Fernando Vicente | 3 | 4
(Italy) Francesco Aldi | 5 | 6 | 4
7 | (Serbia) Boris Pašanski | 7 | 2 | 6

Second round
2 | (Spain) Rubén Ramírez Hidalgo | 6 | 6
(France) Jean-Christophe Faurel | 3 | 1
(Spain) Sergio Gutiérrez Ferrol | 5 | 6^{5}
7 | (Serbia) Boris Pašanski | 7 | 7^{7}

Qualifying competition
2 | (Spain) Rubén Ramírez Hidalgo | 6 | 6
7 | (Serbia) Boris Pašanski | 1 | 2

==== Third qualifier ====
First round
(Morocco) Reda Karakhi | 2 | 2
(Italy) Stefano Galvani | 6 | 6
(Morocco) Mohamed Saber | 6 | 6
(Zimbabwe) Mbonisi Ndimande | 4 | 2
(Spain) Carles Poch Gradin | 6 | 6
6 | (Andorra) Laurent Recouderc | 4 | 2

Second round
3 | (Spain) Santiago Ventura Bertomeu | 6 | 6
(Italy) Stefano Galvani | 0 | 4
(Morocco) Mohamed Saber | 1 | 3
(Spain) Carles Poch Gradin | 6 | 6

Qualifying competition
3 | (Spain) Santiago Ventura Bertomeu | 6 | 6
(Spain) Carles Poch Gradin | 3 | 1

==== Fourth qualifier ====
First round
WC | (Morocco) Ali El Alaoui | 2 | 2
(United States) Eric Butorac | 6 | 6
(Italy) Gianluca Naso | 4 | 2
(Austria) Oliver Marach | 6 | 6
(Spain) Adrián Menéndez Maceiras | 5 | 6 | 6^{4}
8 | (Poland) Łukasz Kubot | 7 | 2 | 7^{7}

Second round
4 | (France) Olivier Patience | 6 | 6
(United States) Eric Butorac | 4 | 3
(Austria) Oliver Marach | 7 | 6
8 | (Poland) Łukasz Kubot | 5 | 4

Qualifying competition
4 | (France) Olivier Patience | 7^{7} | 4 | 1
(Austria) Oliver Marach | 6^{4} | 6 | 6
