= 2007 Grand Prix Hassan II =

- Date: 23–29 April
- Edition: 23rd
- Draw: 32S / 16D
- Prize money: $391,000
- Surface: Clay / outdoor
- Location: Casablanca, Morocco

Champions

Singles
- (France) Paul-Henri Mathieu

Doubles
- (Australia) Jordan Kerr / (Czech Republic) David Škoch
- Grand Prix Hassan II

The 2007 Grand Prix Hassan II was a men's tennis event on the 2007 ATP Tour played in Casablanca, Morocco on clay sourts. It was the 23rd edition of the tournament and was held from 23 April through 29 April. The event was won by Paul-Henri Mathieu in men's singles and Jordan Kerr and David Škoch in men's doubles.

== Finals ==
=== Singles ===
(France) Paul-Henri Mathieu defeated (Spain) Albert Montañés 6–1, 6–1

=== Doubles ===
(Australia) Jordan Kerr / (Czech Republic) David Škoch defeated (Poland) Łukasz Kubot / (Austria) Oliver Marach 7–6^{(7–4)}, 1–6, [10–4]
