= 2009 Grand Prix Hassan II =

- Date: April 6 – April 12
- Edition: 25th

Champions

Singles
- (Spain) Juan Carlos Ferrero

Doubles
- (Poland) Łukasz Kubot / (Austria) Oliver Marach
- Grand Prix Hassan II

The 2009 Grand Prix Hassan II was a tennis tournament played on outdoor clay courts. It was the 25th edition of the Grand Prix Hassan II, and was an ATP Tour World 250 event on the 2009 ATP World Tour. It took place at the Complexe Al Amal in Casablanca, Morocco, from April 6 through April 12, 2009.

== Finals ==
=== Singles ===
(Spain) Juan Carlos Ferrero defeated (France) Florent Serra, 6–4, 7–5

- It was Juan Carlos Ferrero's 1st title in 5 years, and his 12th overall.

=== Doubles ===
(Poland) Łukasz Kubot / (Austria) Oliver Marach defeated (Sweden) Simon Aspelin / (Australia) Paul Hanley, 7–6^{(7–4)}, 3–6, [10–6]
