= 2010 Alessandria Challenger – Singles =

Singles
- 2010 Alessandria Challenger

Final
- Champion: (Germany) Björn Phau
- Runner-up: (Argentina) Carlos Berlocq
- Score: 7–6^{(8–6)}, 2–6, 6–2

Events
Singles	Doubles
← 2009 ·	Alessandria Challenger	· 2011 →

Blaž Kavčič was the defending champion, but he chose to compete at the French Open instead.
Björn Phau won in the final 7–6^{(8–6)}, 2–6, 6–2, against Carlos Berlocq.

== Seeds ==
1. (Portugal) Frederico Gil (second round)
2. (Portugal) Rui Machado (second round)
3. (Germany) Björn Phau (champion)
4. (Austria) Stefan Koubek (first round)
5. (Spain) Rubén Ramírez Hidalgo (first round)
6. (Brazil) João Souza (quarterfinals)
7. (Kazakhstan) Mikhail Kukushkin (second round)
8. (Romania) Victor Crivoi (first round)

== Draw ==
=== Key ===
- Q = Qualifier
- WC = Wild card
- LL = Lucky loser
- Alt = Alternate
- SE = Special exempt
- PR = Protected ranking
- ITF = ITF entry
- JE = Junior exempt
- w/o = Walkover
- r = Retired
- d = Defaulted
- SR = Special ranking

=== Finals ===
Semifinals
(Morocco) Reda El Amrani	4	2
3	(Germany) Björn Phau	6	6
(Argentina) Juan Pablo Brzezicki	3	3
(Argentina) Carlos Berlocq	6	6

Final
3	(Germany) Björn Phau	7	2	6
(Argentina) Carlos Berlocq	6^{6}	6	2

=== Top half ===
First round
1	(Portugal) F Gil	6	6
WC	(Lithuania) L Grigelis	2	0
(Czech Republic) L Rosol	7	6
Q	(Italy) M Viola	5	1
(Morocco) R El Amrani	7	6
(Italy) F Cipolla	5	2
Q	(Spain) I Cervantes-Huegun	1	6	6
5	(Spain) R Ramírez Hidalgo	6	2	2
3	(Germany) B Phau	6	6
(Australia) M Ebden	4	3
WC	(Italy) J Marchegiani	3	3
(Brazil) C Zampieri	6	6
WC	(Italy) M Crugnola	4	1	r
WC	(Italy) M Trevisan	6	3
Q	(United States) A Bogomolov Jr.	3	3
6	(Brazil) J Souza	6	6

Second round
1	(Portugal) F Gil	5	6	3
(Czech Republic) L Rosol	7	3	6
(Morocco) R El Amrani	6	6	7
Q	(Spain) I Cervantes-Huegun	3	7	6
3	(Germany) B Phau	6	6
(Brazil) C Zampieri	3	2
WC	(Italy) M Trevisan	4	3	r
6	(Brazil) J Souza	6	4

Quarterfinals
(Czech Republic) L Rosol	3	1
(Morocco) R El Amrani	6	6
3	(Germany) B Phau	4	7	6
6	(Brazil) J Souza	6	5	2

Semifinals
(Morocco) R El Amrani	4	2
3	(Germany) B Phau	6	6

=== Bottom half ===
First round
8	(Romania) V Crivoi	4	2
ALT	(Italy) S Vagnozzi	6	6
(Spain) G Alcaide	6	1
(Argentina) M Vassallo Argüello	2	0	r
(Argentina) JP Brzezicki	7	6
(Brazil) R Hocevar	5	4
SE	(Austria) A Peya	3	7	7
4	(Austria) S Koubek	6	6^{6}	6^{6}
7	(Kazakhstan) M Kukushkin	6	6^{5}	6
(Spain) R Bautista-Agut	4	7	3
(Croatia) I Dodig	4	2
(Argentina) C Berlocq	6	6
Q	(Spain) D Muñoz-De La Nava	6	6
(Romania) A Ungur	2	0
(Japan) Y Sugita	2	3
2	(Portugal) R Machado	6	6

Second round
ALT	(Italy) S Vagnozzi	7	6
(Spain) G Alcaide	6^{1}	4
(Argentina) JP Brzezicki	3	6	6
SE	(Austria) A Peya	6	2	3
7	(Kazakhstan) M Kukushkin	2	1
(Argentina) C Berlocq	6	6
Q	(Spain) D Muñoz-De La Nava	3	6	6
2	(Portugal) R Machado	6	3	2

Quarterfinals
ALT	(Italy) S Vagnozzi	7	4	3
(Argentina) JP Brzezicki	5	6	6
(Argentina) C Berlocq	7	6
Q	(Spain) D Muñoz-De La Nava	5	3

Semifinals
(Argentina) JP Brzezicki	3	3
(Argentina) C Berlocq	6	6
