= 2007 Grand Prix Hassan II – Singles =

Singles
- 2007 Grand Prix Hassan II

Final
- Champion: (France) Paul-Henri Mathieu
- Runner-up: (Spain) Albert Montañés
- Score: 6–1, 6–1

Details
- Draw: 32
- Seeds: 8

Events
Singles	Doubles
← 2006 ·	Grand Prix Hassan II	· 2008 →

Paul-Henri Mathieu defeated Albert Montañés 6–1, 6–1, to win the 2007 Grand Prix Hassan II singles event.

== Seeds ==
1. (Slovakia) Dominik Hrbatý (quarterfinals)
2. (Argentina) José Acasuso (quarterfinals)
3. (France) Julien Benneteau (quarterfinals)
4. (France) Gilles Simon (first round)
5. (France) Marc Gicquel (semifinals)
6. (France) Arnaud Clément (second round)
7. (Chile) Nicolás Massú (second round, retired because of an abdominal muscle strain)
8. (France) Paul-Henri Mathieu (champion)

== Draws ==
=== Key ===
- Q - Qualifier
- WC - Wildcard
- r - Retired

=== Finals ===
Semifinals
(Spain) Albert Montañés	1	7	6
(Spain) Rubén Ramírez Hidalgo	6	5	3
5	(France) Marc Gicquel	3	5
8	(France) Paul-Henri Mathieu	6	7

Finals
(Spain) Albert Montañés	1	1
8	(France) Paul-Henri Mathieu	6	6

=== Top half ===
First round
1	(Slovakia) D Hrbatý	7^{9}	6
(Austria) A Peya	6^{7}	4
WC	(Morocco) R Chaki	2	1
WC	(Algeria) S Saoudi	6	6
(Spain) A Montañés	1	6	7
(Thailand) D Udomchoke	6	3	5
(Argentina) S Roitman	2	3
7	(Chile) N Massú	6	6
4	(France) G Simon	4	4
(Spain) R Ramírez Hidalgo	6	6
Q	(France) T Ascione	6	6
WC	(Morocco) Y El Aynaoui	4	3
(Romania) V Hănescu	6^{4}	4
(France) S Grosjean	7^{7}	6
(Latvia) E Gulbis	6^{1}	3
6	(France) A Clément	7^{7}	6

Second round
1	(Slovakia) D Hrbatý	7	7^{7}
WC	(Algeria) S Saoudi	5	6^{2}
(Spain) A Montañés	6	2
7	(Chile) N Massú	1	1^{r}
(Spain) R Ramírez Hidalgo	6	7^{7}
Q	(France) T Ascione	4	6^{4}
(France) S Grosjean	4	7	6
6	(France) A Clément	6	5	1

Quarterfinals
1	(Slovakia) D Hrbatý	6^{5}	3
(Spain) A Montañés	7^{7}	6
(Spain) R Ramírez Hidalgo	1	7	7^{7}
(France) S Grosjean	6	5	6^{3}

Semifinals
(Spain) A Montañés	1	7	6
(Spain) R Ramírez Hidalgo	6	5	3

=== Bottom half ===
First round
5	(France) M Gicquel	6	6
(Italy) A di Mauro	4	3
Q	(France) N Mahut	6	6
(France) F Serra	2	4
(Argentina) D Hartfield	1	4
(United States) M Russell	6	6
Q	(Portugal) F Gil	6^{2}	6	6^{5}
3	(France) J Benneteau	7^{7}	2	7^{7}
8	(France) PH Mathieu	6	6
(Denmark) K Pless	3	1
(Argentina) M Vassallo Argüello	2	2
Q	(France) É Roger-Vasselin	6	6
(Serbia) J Tipsarević	6	7^{8}
(France) M Llodra	2	6^{6}
(France) N Devilder	4	4
2	(Argentina) J Acasuso	6	6

Second round
5	(France) M Gicquel	6	6
Q	(France) N Mahut	2	4
(United States) M Russell	3	3
3	(France) J Benneteau	6	6
8	(France) PH Mathieu	4	6	6
Q	(France) É Roger-Vasselin	6	3	4
(Serbia) J Tipsarević	4	4
2	(Argentina) J Acasuso	6	6

Quarterfinals
5	(France) M Gicquel	3	6	6
3	(France) J Benneteau	6	1	1
8	(France) PH Mathieu	7^{7}	6
2	(Argentina) J Acasuso	6^{5}	4

Semifinals
5	(France) M Gicquel	3	5
8	(France) PH Mathieu	6	7
