= 2008 Grand Prix Hassan II =

- Date: 18–25 May
- Edition: 24th
- Category: International Series
- Draw: 32S / 16D
- Prize money: €349,000
- Surface: Clay / outdoor
- Location: Casablanca, Morocco

Champions

Singles
- (France) Gilles Simon

Doubles
- (Spain) Albert Montañés / (Spain) Santiago Ventura
- Grand Prix Hassan II

The 2008 Grand Prix Hassan II was a men's tennis tournament played on outdoor clay courts. It was the 24th edition of the Grand Prix Hassan II, and was part of the International Series of the 2008 ATP Tour. It took place at the Complexe Al Amal in Casablanca, Morocco, from 18 May through 25 May 2008.

The main draw was led by Australian Open runner-up and Sydney doubles champion Jo-Wilfried Tsonga, 2007 Bucharest semifinalist Gaël Monfils, and Houston quarterfinalist Agustín Calleri. Other seeded players were Estoril quarterfinalist Marc Gicquel, Auckland semifinalist Julien Benneteau, Chris Guccione, Florent Serra and Victor Hănescu.

== Finals ==
=== Singles ===
(France) Gilles Simon defeated (France) Julien Benneteau, 7–5, 6–2

- It was Gilles Simon's 1st title of the year, and his 3rd overall.

=== Doubles ===
(Spain) Albert Montañés / (Spain) Santiago Ventura defeated (United States) James Cerretani / (Australia) Todd Perry, 6–1, 6–2
