= 2008 Masters Series Hamburg – Singles =

Singles
- 2008 Masters Series Hamburg

Final
- Champion: (Spain) Rafael Nadal
- Runner-up: (Switzerland) Roger Federer
- Score: 7–5, 6–7^{(3–7)}, 6–3

Details
- Draw: 56 (4WC/7Q/3LL)
- Seeds: 16

Events
Singles	Doubles
← 2007 ·	Hamburg European Open	· 2009 →

Rafael Nadal defeated the defending champion Roger Federer in a rematch of the previous year's final, 7–5, 6–7^{(3–7)}, 6–3 to win the singles tennis title at the 2008 Hamburg European Open.

This was the last edition of the tournament played as an ATP Masters Series event, as it was downgraded to an ATP Tour 500 event for the 2009 season.

== Seeds ==
The top eight seeds receive a bye into the second round.

1. (Switzerland) Roger Federer (final)
2. (Spain) Rafael Nadal (champion)
3. (Serbia) Novak Djokovic (semifinals)
4. (Russia) Nikolay Davydenko (third round)
5. (Spain) David Ferrer (third round)
6. (United States) ~~Andy Roddick~~ (withdrew due to a back injury)
7. (United States) James Blake (second round)
8. (France) Richard Gasquet (second round)
9. (Czech Republic) Tomáš Berdych (second round)
10. (Russia) Mikhail Youzhny (first round)
11. (Spain) Carlos Moyá (quarterfinals)
12. (Argentina) Juan Mónaco (third round)
13. (Spain) Tommy Robredo (second round)
14. (France) Jo-Wilfried Tsonga (second round)
15. (United Kingdom) Andy Murray (third round)
16. (France) Paul-Henri Mathieu (first round)
17. (Spain) ~~Nicolás Almagro~~ (withdrew due to a wrist injury)

== Draw ==
=== Key ===
- Q = Qualifier
- WC = Wild card
- LL = Lucky loser
- Alt = Alternate
- SE = Special exempt
- PR = Protected ranking
- ITF = ITF entry
- JE = Junior exempt
- w/o = Walkover
- r = Retired
- d = Defaulted
- SR = Special ranking

=== Finals ===
Quarterfinals
1	(Switzerland) Roger Federer	6	6
(Spain) Fernando Verdasco	3	3
(Germany) Nicolas Kiefer	3	7	5
(Italy) Andreas Seppi	6	5	7
(Spain) Albert Montañés	2	3
3	(Serbia) Novak Djokovic	6	6
11	(Spain) Carlos Moyá	1	3
2	(Spain) Rafael Nadal	6	6

Semifinals
1	(Switzerland) Roger Federer	6	6
(Italy) Andreas Seppi	3	1
3	(Serbia) Novak Djokovic	5	6	2
2	(Spain) Rafael Nadal	7	2	6

Final
1	(Switzerland) Roger Federer	5	7^{7}	3
2	(Spain) Rafael Nadal	7	6^{3}	6

=== Top half ===
==== Section 1 ====
First round
(Finland) J Nieminen	6	6
WC	(Germany) R Schüttler	1	3
(Russia) I Andreev	6	3	3
(Sweden) R Söderling	4	6	6
(France) N Mahut	6	6^{5}	2
14	(France) J-W Tsonga	0	7^{7}	6
10	(Russia) M Youzhny	3	2
(Spain) F Verdasco	6	6
(Argentina) G Cañas	6^{7}	2
(France) M Llodra	7^{9}	6
(Spain) F López	3	4
LL	(Czech Republic) I Minář	6	6

Second round
1	(Switzerland) R Federer	6	6
(Finland) J Nieminen	1	3
(Sweden) R Söderling	6	7
14	(France) J-W Tsonga	2	5
(Spain) F Verdasco	6	6
(France) M Llodra	2	0
LL	(Czech Republic) I Minář	3	3
5	(Spain) D Ferrer	6	6

Third round
1	(Switzerland) R Federer	6	6
(Sweden) R Söderling	3	2
(Spain) F Verdasco	7^{7}	6
5	(Spain) D Ferrer	6^{4}	2

Quarterfinals
1	(Switzerland) R Federer	6	6
(Spain) F Verdasco	3	3

==== Section 2 ====
First round
(Belgium) S Darcis	7^{8}	5	6^{4}
(Croatia) I Ljubičić	6^{6}	7	7^{7}
(Switzerland) S Wawrinka	6	6
Q	(Spain) A Martín	3	3
(Germany) N Kiefer	6	6
16	(France) P-H Mathieu	4	4
12	(Argentina) J Mónaco	6	4
(Italy) F Volandri	1	0	r
(Italy) S Bolelli	7	6
Q	(Spain) M Granollers	5	2
WC	(Germany) M Berrer	3	0
(Italy) A Seppi	6	6

Second round
4	(Russia) N Davydenko	6	6
(Croatia) I Ljubičić	4	1
(Switzerland) S Wawrinka	5	5
(Germany) N Kiefer	7	7
12	(Argentina) J Mónaco	6	6
(Italy) S Bolelli	2	1
(Italy) A Seppi	6	6
8	(France) R Gasquet	3	2

Third round
4	(Russia) N Davydenko	5	3
(Germany) N Kiefer	7	6
12	(Argentina) J Mónaco	0	3
(Italy) A Seppi	6	6

Quarterfinals
(Germany) N Kiefer	3	7	5
(Italy) A Seppi	6	5	7

=== Bottom half ===
==== Section 3 ====
First round
(Serbia) J Tipsarević	3	6	6
WC	(Germany) A Beck	6	3	1
(Spain) A Montañés	6	6
(United States) M Fish	1	3
(Argentina) J Acasuso	5
LL	(Belgium) K Vliegen	2	r
13	(Spain) T Robredo	2	7^{7}	6
(Germany) P Kohlschreiber	6	6^{5}	3
WC	(Germany) M Zverev	6^{4}	6^{3}
(Croatia) I Karlović	7^{7}	7^{7}
(Argentina) JI Chela	6	6
Q	(Spain) JA Sanchez de Luna	3	3

Second round
7	(United States) J Blake	6	3	3
(Serbia) J Tipsarević	4	6	6
(Spain) A Montañés	7^{7}	6
(Argentina) J Acasuso	6^{3}	3
13	(Spain) T Robredo	6	2	6^{3}
(Croatia) I Karlović	3	6	7^{7}
(Argentina) JI Chela	3	1
3	(Serbia) N Djokovic	6	6

Third round
(Serbia) J Tipsarević	2	1
(Spain) A Montañés	6	6
(Croatia) I Karlović	6^{3}	3
3	(Serbia) N Djokovic	7^{7}	6

Quarterfinals
(Spain) A Montañés	2	3
3	(Serbia) N Djokovic	6	6

==== Section 4 ====
First round
(Croatia) M Čilić	5	2
Q	(Russia) M Safin	7	6
Q	(Italy) G Naso	6^{11}	6	4
LL	(Belgium) O Rochus	7^{13}	2	6
Q	(France) J Benneteau	6	4	6^{7}
11	(Spain) C Moyá	3	6	7^{9}
15	(United Kingdom) A Murray	6	6
(Russia) D Tursunov	4	1
(Belgium) X Malisse	4	5
(France) G Simon	6	7
Q	(Peru) L Horna	3	2	r
(Italy) P Starace	6	4

Second round
9	(Czech Republic) T Berdych	5	4
Q	(Russia) M Safin	7	6
LL	(Belgium) O Rochus	5	3
11	(Spain) C Moyá	7	6
15	(United Kingdom) A Murray	6	6
(France) G Simon	3	3
(Italy) P Starace	4	6^{6}
2	(Spain) R Nadal	6	7^{8}

Third round
Q	(Russia) M Safin	2	7^{7}	1
11	(Spain) C Moyá	6	6^{3}	6
15	(United Kingdom) A Murray	3	2
2	(Spain) R Nadal	6	6

Quarterfinals
11	(Spain) C Moyá	1	3
2	(Spain) R Nadal	6	6

== Qualifying ==
=== Qualifying seeds ===
1. (Spain) Marcel Granollers (qualified)
2. (France) Julien Benneteau (qualified)
3. (Belgium) Olivier Rochus (qualifying competition, Lucky loser)
4. (Czech Republic) Ivo Minář (qualifying competition, Lucky loser)
5. (Romania) Victor Hănescu (first round)
6. (Russia) Marat Safin (qualified)
7. (Austria) Jürgen Melzer (first round)
8. (Belgium) Kristof Vliegen (qualifying competition, Lucky loser)
9. (Russia) Evgeny Korolev (qualifying competition)
10. (Uruguay) Pablo Cuevas (first round)
11. (Serbia) Boris Pašanski (qualifying competition)
12. (Peru) Luis Horna (qualified)
13. (Italy) Flavio Cipolla (first round)
14. (Spain) Alberto Martín (qualified)

=== Qualifiers ===
1. (Spain) Marcel Granollers
2. (France) Julien Benneteau
3. (Spain) Alberto Martín
4. (Peru) Luis Horna
5. (Spain) José Antonio Sánchez de Luna
6. (Russia) Marat Safin
7. (Italy) Gianluca Naso

=== Lucky losers ===
1. (Belgium) Olivier Rochus
2. (Croatia) Ivo Minář
3. (Belgium) Kristof Vliegen

=== Qualifying draw ===
==== First qualifier ====
First round
1	(Spain) Marcel Granollers	6	6
(Italy) Leonardo Azzaro	4	2
(Brazil) Júlio Silva	4	5
8	(Belgium) Kristof Vliegen	6	7

Qualifying competition
1	(Spain) Marcel Granollers	6	3	6
8	(Belgium) Kristof Vliegen	2	6	4

==== Second qualifier ====
First round
2	(France) Julien Benneteau	6	6
WC	(Germany) Alexander Waske	3	2
(Belarus) Max Mirnyi	4	2
11	(Serbia) Boris Pašanski	6	6

Qualifying competition
2	(France) Julien Benneteau	3	6	6
11	(Serbia) Boris Pašanski	6	3	4

==== Third qualifier ====
First round
3	(Belgium) Olivier Rochus	6	6
(Czech Republic) Jan Mertl	4	4
(Croatia) Ivan Cerović	2	6	3
14	(Spain) Alberto Martín	6	3	6

Qualifying competition
3	(Belgium) Olivier Rochus	6	3	4
14	(Spain) Alberto Martín	4	6	6

==== Fourth qualifier ====
First round
4	(Czech Republic) Ivo Minář	3
(Czech Republic) Jan Minář	0^{r}
(Italy) Simone Vagnozzi	6	4	6^{4}
12	(Peru) Luis Horna	2	6	7^{7}

Qualifying competition
4	(Czech Republic) Ivo Minář	4	6	3
12	(Peru) Luis Horna	6	2	6

==== Fifth qualifier ====
First round
5	(Romania) Victor Hănescu	3	7^{7}	5
(Uzbekistan) Denis Istomin	6	6^{2}	7
(Spain) José Antonio Sánchez de Luna	6	2	6
10	(Uruguay) Pablo Cuevas	4	6	0

Qualifying competition
(Uzbekistan) Denis Istomin	4	1
(Spain) José Antonio Sánchez de Luna	6	6

==== Sixth qualifier ====
First round
6/WC	(Russia) Marat Safin	4	6	6
(Germany) Julian Reister	6	2	1
WC	(Germany) Stefan Seifert	6^{1}	6	3
9	(Russia) Evgeny Korolev	7^{7}	4	6

Qualifying competition
6/WC	(Russia) Marat Safin	6	4	7^{7}
9	(Russia) Evgeny Korolev	4	6	6^{5}

==== Seventh qualifier ====
First round
7	(Austria) Jürgen Melzer	6^{5}	6	3
WC	(Germany) Jaan-Frederik Brunken	7^{7}	2	6
(Italy) Gianluca Naso	7	6
13	(Italy) Flavio Cipolla	5	3

Qualifying competition
WC	(Germany) Jaan-Frederik Brunken	1	3
(Italy) Gianluca Naso	6	6
