= 2009 Morocco Tennis Tour – Tanger =

- Date: February 16 – February 21
- Edition: 2nd
- Location: Tanger, Morocco

Champions

Singles
- (Spain) Marc López

Doubles
- (France) Augustin Gensse / (France) Éric Prodon
- Morocco Tennis Tour – Tanger

The 2009 Morocco Tennis Tour – Tanger was a professional tennis tournament played on outdoor clay courts. It was part of the 2009 ATP Challenger Tour. It took place in Tanger, Morocco between 16 and 21 February 2009.

== Singles main-draw entrants ==
=== Seeds ===
Country	Player	Rank	Seed
CZE	Jiří Vaněk	119	1
POR	Rui Machado	151	2
ESP	Pere Riba	152	3
AUS	Peter Luczak	162	4
ALG	Lamine Ouahab	179	5
FRA	Éric Prodon	196	6
ESP	Fernando Vicente	206	7
ITA	Giancarlo Petrazzuolo	222	8

- Rankings are as of February 9, 2009.

=== Other entrants ===
The following players received wildcards into the singles main draw:

- (Morocco) Rabie Chaki
- (Morocco) Talal Ouahabi
- (Morocco) Younès Rachidi
- (Morocco) Mehdi Ziadi

The following players received entry from the qualifying draw:

- (France) Augustin Gensse
- (Tunisia) Malek Jaziri
- (Argentina) Leandro Migani
- (Spain) José Antonio Sánchez de Luna

== Champions ==
=== Men's singles ===
(Spain) Marc López def. (Spain) Pere Riba, 5–7, 6–4, 7–6(9)

=== Men's doubles ===
(France) Augustin Gensse / (France) Éric Prodon def. (Italy) Giancarlo Petrazzuolo / (Italy) Simone Vagnozzi, 6–1, 7–6(3)
