= 2011 Alessandria Challenger =

Tennis tournament

- Date: 23–29 May
- Edition: 4th
- Location: Alessandria, Italy

Champions

Singles
- (Spain) Pablo Carreño Busta

Doubles
- (Austria) Martin Fischer / (Austria) Philipp Oswald
← 2010 ·	Alessandria Challenger	· 2012 →

The 2011 Alessandria Challenger was a professional tennis tournament played on clay courts. It was the fourth edition of the tournament which is part of the 2011 ATP Challenger Tour. It took place in Alessandria, Italy between 23 and 29 May 2011.

== ATP entrants ==
=== Seeds ===
Country	Player	Rank^{1}	Seed
ARG	Diego Junqueira	105	1
BRA	João Souza	128	2
ITA	Paolo Lorenzi	131	3
AUT	Martin Fischer	139	4
CHI	Paul Capdeville	141	5
BRA	Rogério Dutra da Silva	142	6
ITA	Alessio di Mauro	151	7
SVN	Grega Žemlja	156	8

- Rankings are as of May 16, 2011.

=== Other entrants ===
The following players received wildcards into the singles main draw:

- (Ukraine) Sergei Bubka
- (Italy) Alessandro Giannessi
- (Italy) Gianluca Naso
- (Italy) Matteo Trevisan

The following players received entry as an alternate into the singles main draw:

- (Belgium) Ruben Bemelmans

The following players received entry as a special exempt into the singles main draw:

- (Spain) Pablo Carreño Busta

The following players received entry from the qualifying draw:

- (Kazakhstan) Evgeny Korolev
- (Spain) Iván Navarro
- (Canada) Peter Polansky
- (United States) Jesse Witten

== Champions ==
=== Singles ===
(Spain) Pablo Carreño Busta def. (Spain) Roberto Bautista Agut, 3–6, 6–3, 7–5

=== Doubles ===
(Austria) Martin Fischer / (Austria) Philipp Oswald def. (South Africa) Jeff Coetzee / (Sweden) Andreas Siljeström, 6–7(5), 7–5, [10–6]
