= 2010 Alessandria Challenger – Doubles =

Doubles
- 2010 Alessandria Challenger

Final
- Champions: (Croatia) Ivan Dodig (Croatia) Lovro Zovko
- Runners-up: (Italy) Marco Crugnola (Spain) Daniel Muñoz-de la Nava
- Score: 6–4, 6–4

Events
Singles	Doubles
- Alessandria Challenger

Rubén Ramírez Hidalgo and José Antonio Sánchez-de Luna were the defending champions, however Sánchez-de Luna chose not to compete this year.
Ramírez Hidalgo partnered up with Juan Pablo Brzezicki, but they lost to Marco Crugnola and Daniel Muñoz-de la Nava in the semifinals.

Croatian pair Ivan Dodig and Lovro Zovko won in the final 6–4, 6–4, against Crugnola and Muñoz-de la Nava.

== Seeds ==
1. (Thailand) Sanchai Ratiwatana / (Thailand) Sonchat Ratiwatana (first round)
2. (Croatia) Ivan Dodig / (Croatia) Lovro Zovko (champions)
3. (Australia) Sadik Kadir / (India) Purav Raja (semifinals)
4. (Argentina) Juan Pablo Brzezicki / (Spain) Rubén Ramírez Hidalgo (semifinals)

== Draw ==
Key

- Q = Qualifier
- WC = Wild card
- LL = Lucky loser
- Alt = Alternate
- ITF = ITF entry
- PR = Protected ranking
- SR = Special ranking
- SE = Special exempt
- JE = Junior exempt
- JR = Junior Accelerator Programme entrant
- CO = College Accelerator Programme entrant
- NG = Next Gen Accelerator Program entrant
- w/o = Walkover
- r = Retired
- d = Defaulted

=== Draw ===
First round
1	(Thailand) Sa Ratiwatana (Thailand) So Ratiwatana	1	4
WC	(Italy) M Crugnola (Spain) D Muñoz-de la Nava	6	6
(Germany) B Phau (Austria) M Slanar	6^{5}	6	[6]
(Portugal) R Machado (Spain) C Poch-Gradin	7	2	[10]
4	(Argentina) JP Brzezicki (Spain) R Ramírez Hidalgo	6	2	[10]
(United States) A Bogomolov Jr. (Kazakhstan) M Kukushkin	4	6	[8]
(Argentina) C Berlocq (Portugal) F Gil	3	7	[10]
(Brazil) R Hocevar (Brazil) J Souza	6	6^{2}	[4]
WC	(Italy) M Trevisan (Romania) A Ungur
(Spain) R Bautista-Agut (Japan) Y Sugita	w/o
(Argentina) D Álvarez (Colombia) A González	2	7	[7]
3	(Australia) S Kadir (India) P Raja	6	5	[10]
(Italy) F Cipolla (Italy) S Vagnozzi	7	6
WC	(Lithuania) L Grigelis (Italy) A Stoppini	5	3
(Australia) M Ebden (Czech Republic) L Rosol	6	4	[4]
2	(Croatia) I Dodig (Croatia) L Zovko	2	6	[10]

Quarterfinals
WC	(Italy) M Crugnola (Spain) D Muñoz-de la Nava	6	3	[10]
(Portugal) R Machado (Spain) C Poch-Gradin	0	6	[7]
4	(Argentina) JP Brzezicki (Spain) R Ramírez Hidalgo	6	6
(Argentina) C Berlocq (Portugal) F Gil	3	2
(Spain) R Bautista-Agut (Japan) Y Sugita	6	2	[8]
3	(Australia) S Kadir (India) P Raja	4	6	[10]
(Italy) F Cipolla (Italy) S Vagnozzi	4	6	[7]
2	(Croatia) I Dodig (Croatia) L Zovko	6	1	[10]

Semifinals
WC	(Italy) M Crugnola (Spain) D Muñoz-de la Nava	6	3	[12]
4	(Argentina) JP Brzezicki (Spain) R Ramírez Hidalgo	4	6	[10]
3	(Australia) S Kadir (India) P Raja	7	4	[9]
2	(Croatia) I Dodig (Croatia) L Zovko	6^{5}	6	[11]

Finals
WC	(Italy) M Crugnola (Spain) D Muñoz-de la Nava	4	4
2	(Croatia) I Dodig (Croatia) L Zovko	6	6
