= 2010 Alessandria Challenger =

- Date: May 24 – May 30
- Edition: 3rd
- Location: Alessandria, Italy

Champions

Singles
- (Germany) Björn Phau

Doubles
- (Croatia) Ivan Dodig / (Croatia) Lovro Zovko
← 2009 ·	Alessandria Challenger	· 2011 →

The 2010 Alessandria Challenger (known as 2010 Trofeo Cassa di Risparmio Alessandria due to sponsorship) was a professional tennis tournament played on outdoor red clay courts. It was part of the 2010 ATP Challenger Tour. It took place in Alessandria, Italy between May 24–30, 2010.

== ATP entrants ==
=== Seeds ===
Nationality	Player	Ranking*	Seeding
POR	Frederico Gil	100	1
POR	Rui Machado	106	2
GER	Björn Phau	115	3
AUT	Stefan Koubek	118	4
ESP	Rubén Ramírez Hidalgo	119	5
BRA	João Souza	128	6
KAZ	Mikhail Kukushkin	137	7
ROU	Victor Crivoi	159	8

- Rankings are as of May 17, 2010.

=== Other entrants ===
The following players received wildcards into the singles main draw:

- (Lithuania) Laurynas Grigelis
- (Italy) Jacopo Marchegiani
- (Italy) Marco Crugnola
- (Italy) Matteo Trevisan

The following players received special exempt into the singles main draw:

- (Austria) Alexander Peya

The following players received entry into the singles main draw with a protected ranking:

- (Italy) Simone Vagnozzi

The following players received entry from the qualifying draw:

- (Italy) Matteo Viola
- (Spain) Iñigo Cervantes-Huegun
- (United States) Alex Bogomolov Jr.
- (Spain) Daniel Muñoz de la Nava

== Champions ==
=== Men's singles ===
(Germany) Björn Phau def. (Argentina) Carlos Berlocq, 7–6(6), 2–6, 6–2

=== Men's doubles ===
(Croatia) Ivan Dodig / (Croatia) Lovro Zovko def. (Italy) Marco Crugnola / (Spain) Daniel Muñoz de la Nava, 6–4, 6–4
