= 2013 Morocco Tennis Tour – Tanger =

- Date: 17–22 June
- Edition: 4th
- Draw: 32S / 16D
- Prize money: €30,000+H
- Surface: Clay
- Location: Tangier, Morocco

Champions

Singles
- (Spain) Pablo Carreño Busta

Doubles
- (Serbia) Nikola Ćirić / (Serbia) Goran Tošić
- Morocco Tennis Tour – Tanger

The 2013 Morocco Tennis Tour – Tanger was a professional tennis tournament played on clay courts. It was the fourth edition of the tournament and part of the 2013 ATP Challenger Tour. It took place in Tangier, Morocco between 17 and 22 June 2013.

== Singles main-draw entrants ==
=== Seeds ===
Country	Player	Rank^{1}	Seed
ESP	Rubén Ramírez Hidalgo	72	1
ESP	Pablo Carreño Busta	147	2
AUT	Gerald Melzer	239	3
POR	Pedro Sousa	248	4
ESP	Marc Giner	251	5
ESP	Gerard Granollers	252	6
ESP	José Checa Calvo	260	7
USA	Tennys Sandgren	278	8

- ^{1} Rankings are as of June 10, 2013.

=== Other entrants ===
The following players received wildcards into the singles main draw:

- (Morocco) Reda El Amrani
- (Morocco) Yassine Idmbarek
- (Morocco) Hicham Khaddari
- (Morocco) Younès Rachidi

The following players received entry from the qualifying draw:

- (Italy) Lorenzo Giustino
- (France) Tristan Lamasine
- (Algeria) Lamine Ouahab
- (Egypt) Sherif Sabry

The following player received entry as lucky loser:

- (Sweden) Isak Arvidsson

== Doubles main-draw entrants ==
=== Seeds ===
Country	Player	Country	Player	Rank^{1}	Seed
AUT	Gerald Melzer	USA	Tennys Sandgren	386	1
SRB	Nikola Ćirić	SRB	Goran Tošić	409	2
USA	Vahid Mirzadeh	USA	Denis Zivkovic	443	3
URU	Ariel Behar	NZL	Artem Sitak	477	4

- ^{1} Rankings as of June 10, 2013.

=== Other entrants ===
The following pairs received wildcards into the doubles main draw:

- (Morocco) Ayoub Chekrouni / (Morocco) Soufiani Sahli
- (Morocco) Reda El Amrani / (Algeria) Lamine Ouahab
- (Morocco) Yassine Idmbarek / (Morocco) Younès Rachidi

The following pair received entry as an alternate:

- (Egypt) Sherif Sabry / (Egypt) Mohamed Safwat

== Champions ==
=== Singles ===
- (Spain) Pablo Carreño Busta def. (Kazakhstan) Mikhail Kukushkin, 6–2, 4–1 ret

=== Doubles ===
- (Serbia) Nikola Ćirić / (Serbia) Goran Tošić def. (Austria) Maximilian Neuchrist / (Croatia) Mate Pavić, 6–3, 6–7^{(5–7)}, [10–8]
