= 2010 Morocco Tennis Tour – Tanger =

- Date: February 15–20
- Edition: 3rd
- Location: Tanger, Morocco

Champions

Singles
- (France) Stéphane Robert

Doubles
- (Belgium) Steve Darcis / (Germany) Dominik Meffert
- Morocco Tennis Tour – Tanger

The 2010 Morocco Tennis Tour – Tanger was a professional tennis tournament played on outdoor clay courts. It was part of the 2010 ATP Challenger Tour. It took place in Tangier, Morocco between 15 and 20 February 2010.

== ATP entrants ==
=== Seeds ===
Country	Player	Rank	Seed
FRA	Stéphane Robert	67	1
BEL	Steve Darcis	104	2
SLO	Blaž Kavčič	112	3
UKR	Oleksandr Dolgopolov Jr.	115	4
ESP	Pere Riba	117	5
POR	Rui Machado	124	6
ESP	Iván Navarro	128	7
ESP	David Marrero	143	8

- Rankings are as of February 8, 2010.

=== Other entrants ===
The following players received wildcards into the singles main draw:

- (Morocco) Reda El Amrani
- (Morocco) Yassine Idmbarek
- (Morocco) Hicham Khaddari
- (Morocco) Mehdi Ziadi

The following players received entry from the qualifying draw:

- (Italy) Francesco Aldi
- (Germany) Bastian Knittel
- (Portugal) Pedro Sousa
- (Spain) Fernando Vicente

The following players received entry as a lucky loser from the qualifying draw:

- (Tunisia) Malek Jaziri

== Champions ==
=== Singles ===
(France) Stéphane Robert def. (Ukraine) Oleksandr Dolgopolov Jr., 7–6(5), 6–4

=== Doubles ===
(Belgium) Steve Darcis / (Germany) Dominik Meffert def. (Belarus) Uladzimir Ignatik / (Slovakia) Martin Kližan, 5–7, 7–5, [10–7]
