= Morocco Tennis Tour – Tanger =

Defunct tennis tournament
- Event name: Morocco Tennis Tour – Tanger
- Founded: 2008
- Abolished: 2013
- Editions: 4
- Location: Tangier, Morocco
- Category: ATP Challenger Tour
- Surface: Clay
- Draw: 32S/32Q/16D
- Prize money: €30,000+H
- Website: www.frmt.ma

The Morocco Tennis Tour – Tanger was a professional tennis tournament played on outdoor red clay courts. It was part of the ATP Challenger Tour in 2009, 2010, and 2013, and the ATP Challenger Series in 2008. The tournament was held in Tangier, Morocco.

== Past finals ==
=== Singles ===
Year	Champion	Runner-up	Score	Ref.
2013	(Spain) Pablo Carreño Busta	(Kazakhstan) Mikhail Kukushkin	6–2, 4–1 (ret.)	
2012	Not held			
2011	Not held			
2010	(France) Stéphane Robert	(Ukraine) Oleksandr Dolgopolov Jr	7–6^{(7–5)}, 6–4	
2009	(Spain) Marc López	(Spain) Pere Riba	5–7, 6–4, 7–6^{(11–9)}	
2008	(Spain) Marcel Granollers	(Spain) Daniel Gimeno Traver	6–4, 6–4	

=== Doubles ===
Year	Champions	Runners-up	Score
2013	(Serbia) Nikola Ćirić (Serbia) Goran Tošić	(Austria) Maximilian Neuchrist (Croatia) Mate Pavić	6–3, 6–7^{(5–7)}, [10–8]
2012	Not held		
2011	Not held		
2010	(Belgium) Steve Darcis (Germany) Dominik Meffert	(Belarus) Uladzimir Ignatik (Slovakia) Martin Kližan	5–7, 7–5, [10–7]
2009	(France) Augustin Gensse (France) Éric Prodon	(Italy) Giancarlo Petrazzuolo (Italy) Simone Vagnozzi	6–1, 7–6^{(6–3)}
2008	(Spain) Miguel Ángel López Jaén (Spain) Iván Navarro	(Spain) Marc López (Spain) Gabriel Trujillo Soler	6–3, 6–7^{(7–5)}, [11–9]
