= Mohamed Saber =

Moroccan tennis player

- Country (sports): Morocco
- Born: 4 September 1987 (age 38) Casablanca, Morocco
- Plays: Right-handed
- Prize money: $22,028

Singles
- Career record: 0–0 (at ATP Tour level, Grand Slam level, and in Davis Cup)
- Career titles: 0 ITF
- Highest ranking: No. 1020 (17 September 2007)

Doubles
- Career record: 1–4 (at ATP Tour level, Grand Slam level, and in Davis Cup)
- Career titles: 4 ITF
- Highest ranking: No. 409 (2 March 2009)
- Last updated on: 21 October 2019.

Mohamed Saber (born 4 September 1987) is a Moroccan tennis player.

Saber has a career high ATP singles ranking of 1020 achieved on 17 September 2007. He also has a career high ATP doubles ranking of 409 achieved on 2 March 2009.

Saber made his ATP main draw debut at the 2008 Grand Prix Hassan II.
