= Florent Serra =

French tennis player

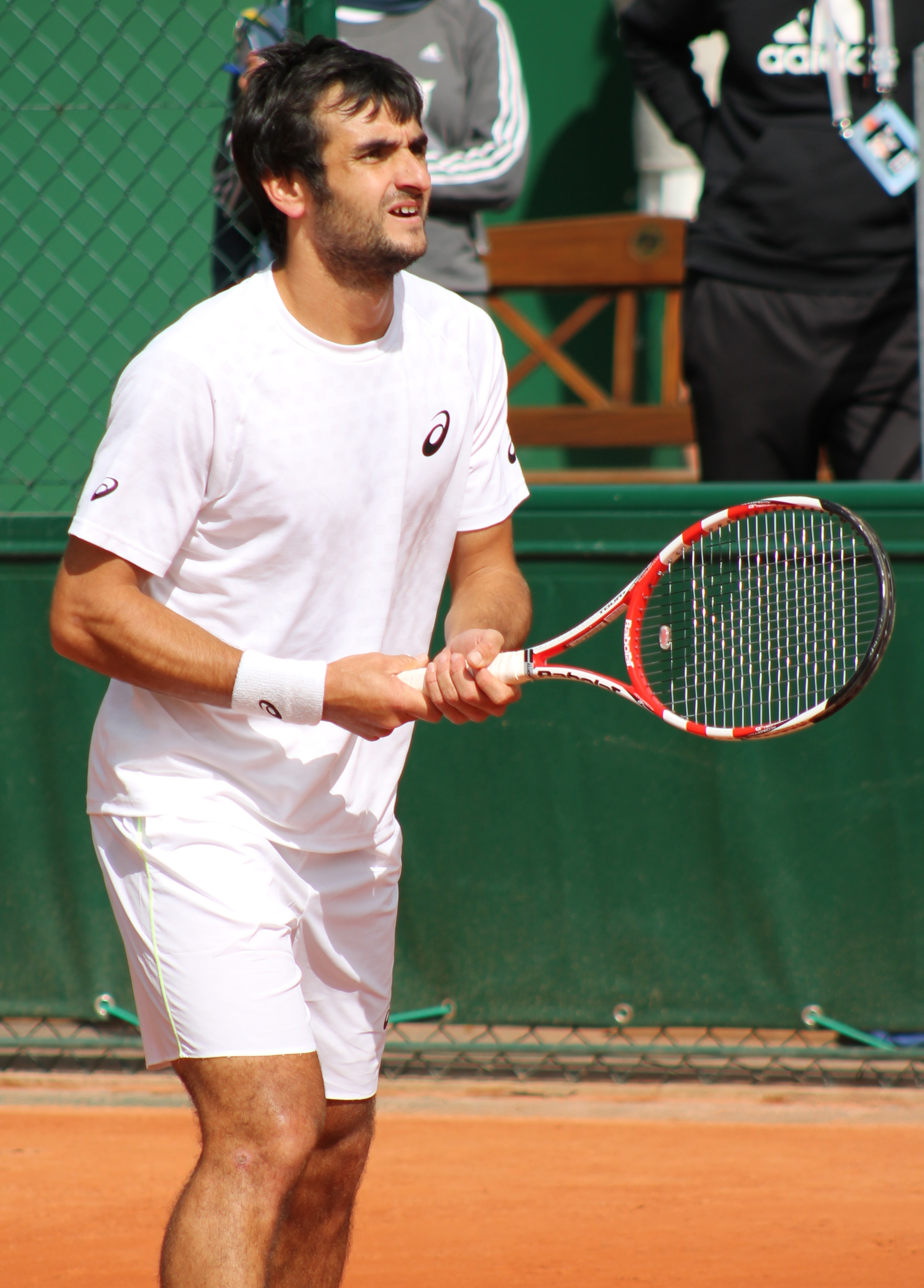
- Country (sports): France
- Residence: Neuchâtel, Switzerland
- Born: 28 February 1981 (age 44) Bordeaux, France
- Height: 1.80 m (5 ft 11 in)
- Turned pro: 2000
- Retired: 2015
- Plays: Right-handed (two-handed backhand)
- Coach: Pierre Cherret
- Prize money: $2,969,796

Singles
- Career record: 123–170
- Career titles: 2
- Highest ranking: No. 36 (26 June 2006)

Grand Slam singles results
- Australian Open: 3R (2010)
- French Open: 3R (2008)
- Wimbledon: 2R (2007, 2008, 2010, 2012)
- US Open: 2R (2005, 2007, 2008, 2010)

Doubles
- Career record: 18–57
- Career titles: 0
- Highest ranking: No. 109 (10 September 2007)

Grand Slam doubles results
- Australian Open: 2R (2007, 2008)
- French Open: 3R (2013)
- Wimbledon: 2R (2007)
- US Open: 3R (2007)

Grand Slam mixed doubles results
- French Open: 2R (2007)
- Last updated on: 17 April 2022.

Florent Lucien Serra (French: [flɔʁɑ̃ sɛʁa]; born 28 February 1981) is a French retired professional tennis player. A right-hander, he won two ATP titles during his career and achieved a career-high singles ranking of World No. 36 in June 2006.

== Career ==
=== Early life and junior career ===
Serra was born in Bordeaux, in the southwest of France, in 1981 to Jean-Luc and Martine. He started playing tennis at the age of seven at a tennis club in Bordeaux after his father got him involved. After completing his A-level equivalent (the French "bac") with a major in economics at 18, Serra left Bordeaux for Paris, to train under the national training program at Roland Garros. As a result of playing minimal junior tournaments, his career high junior ranking was no. 437 on 31 December 1999. He turned pro in 2000.

=== Professional career ===
From 2000 to 2002, he reached six Futures finals, winning one of them, along with reaching his first Challenger final. He made his debut on the ATP Tour in 2003. In 2005 he had his most successful year, winning three out of four Challenger finals, and his first ATP tour title, in Bucharest. He won his second title the following year in Adelaide. In 2009, he was a runner-up in Casablanca. He has been coached by Pierre Cherret since he was a junior player, and his fitness trainer is Paul Quetin. Serra reached the 2nd round of Wimbledon 2012, losing to Kei Nishikori, 3–6, 5–7, 2–6.

== Personal ==
His mother works as a secretary in Bordeaux, while Serra himself lives in Neuchâtel, Switzerland.

== ATP career finals ==
=== Singles: 3 (2 titles, 1 runner-up) ===
Legend Grand Slam Tournaments (0–0) ATP World Tour Finals (0–0) ATP Masters 1000 Series (0–0) ATP 500 Series (0–0) ATP 250 Series (2–1)	Finals by surface Hard (1–0) Clay (1–1) Grass (0–0) Carpet (0–0)	Finals by setting Outdoors (2–1) Indoors (0–0)

Result	W–L	Date	Tournament	Tier	Surface	Opponent	Score
Win	1–0	Sep 2005	Bucharest, Romania	International Series	Clay	(Russia) Igor Andreev	6–3, 6–4
Win	2–0	Feb 2006	Adelaide, Australia	International Series	Hard	(Belgium) Xavier Malisse	6–3, 6–4
Loss	2–1	Apr 2009	Casablanca, Morocco	250 Series	Clay	(Spain) Juan Carlos Ferrero	4–6, 5–7

=== Doubles: 1 (1 runner-up) ===
Legend Grand Slam Tournaments (0–0) ATP World Tour Finals (0–0) ATP Masters Series (0–0) ATP Championship Series (0–0) ATP International Series (0–1)	Finals by surface Hard (0–0) Clay (0–1) Grass (0–0) Carpet (0–0)	Finals by setting Outdoors (0–1) Indoors (0–0)

Result	W–L	Date	Tournament	Tier	Surface	Partner	Opponents	Score
Loss	0–1	Jul 2007	Gstaad, Switzerland	International Series	Clay	(France) Marc Gicquel	(Czech Republic) František Čermák (Czech Republic) Pavel Vízner	5–7, 7–5, [7–10]

== ATP Challenger and ITF Futures finals ==
=== Singles: 13 (4–9) ===
Legend ATP Challenger (3–4) ITF Futures (1–5)	Finals by surface Hard (0–3) Clay (4–6) Grass (0–0) Carpet (0–0)

Result	W–L	Date	Tournament	Tier	Surface	Opponent	Score
Loss	0-1	Jan 2001	France F1, Grasse	Futures	Clay	(Spain) Rubén Ramírez Hidalgo	7–5, 2–6, 2–6
Loss	0-2	Jul 2001	France F11, Bourg-en-Bresse	Futures	Clay	(Algeria) Slimane Saoudi	2–6, 6–7^{(7–9)}
Win	1-2	Jul 2001	France F13, Aix-les-Bains	Futures	Clay	(France) Thierry Ascione	6–2, 6–3
Loss	1-3	Sep 2001	France F16, Mulhouse	Futures	Hard	(Belgium) Arnaud Fontaine	6–3, 3–6, 5–7
Loss	1-4	Jul 2002	Hilversum, Netherlands	Challenger	Clay	(Czech Republic) Tomáš Zíb	6–7^{(3–7)}, 1–6
Loss	1-5	Sep 2002	Netherlands F2, Alphen aan den Rijn	Futures	Clay	(Spain) Óscar Hernández Perez	4–6, 3–6
Loss	1-6	Oct 2003	France F22, La Roche-sur-Yon	Futures	Hard	(France) Jean-François Bachelot	6–7^{(7–9)}, 6–7^{(5–7)}
Win	2-6	Apr 2005	Mexico City, Mexico	Challenger	Clay	(Brazil) Flávio Saretta	6–1, 6–4
Loss	2-7	Apr 2005	Rome, Italy	Challenger	Clay	(France) Olivier Patience	6–7^{(4–7)}, 5–7
Win	3-7	Jul 2005	Rimoni, Italy	Challenger	Clay	(Spain) Iván Navarro	6–3, 6–1
Win	4-7	Sep 2008	Szczecin, Poland	Challenger	Clay	(Spain) Albert Montañés	6–4, 6–3
Loss	4-8	Sep 2009	Szczecin, Poland	Challenger	Clay	(Russia) Evgeny Korolev	4–6, 3–6
Loss	4-9	Nov 2014	Reunion Island, Reunion	Challenger	Hard	(Netherlands) Robin Haase	6–3, 1–6, 5–7

=== Doubles: 3 (1–2) ===
Legend ATP Challenger (0–0) ITF Futures (1–2)	Finals by surface Hard (1–0) Clay (0–2) Grass (0–0) Carpet (0–0)

Result	W–L	Date	Tournament	Tier	Surface	Partner	Opponents	Score
Loss	0–1	Aug 1999	France F9, Toulon	Futures	Clay	(France) Christophe De Veaux	(France) Julien Cuaz (France) Olivier Patience	3–6, 4–6
Loss	0–2	Dec 2000	Spain F15, Maspalomas	Futures	Clay	(France) Fabrice Betencourt	(Spain) Didac Perez-Minarro (Spain) Ferran Ventura-Martell	5–6 ret.
Win	1–2	Apr 2002	Greece F1, Syros	Futures	Hard	(France) Thierry Ascione	(Slovakia) Karol Beck (Slovakia) Michal Mertiňák	3–6, 6–4, 6–2

== Performance timelines ==
Key
W	F	SF	QF	#R	RR	Q#	DNQ	A	NH

(W) winner; (F) finalist; (SF) semifinalist; (QF) quarterfinalist; (#R) rounds 4, 3, 2, 1; (RR) round-robin stage; (Q#) qualification round; (DNQ) did not qualify; (A) absent; (NH) not held; (SR) strike rate (events won / competed); (W–L) win–loss record.

== Singles ==
Tournament	2001	2002	2003	2004	2005	2006	2007	2008	2009	2010	2011	2012	2013	SR	W–L	Win %
Grand Slam tournaments
Australian Open	A	A	Q1	Q1	2R	2R	2R	2R	2R	3R	1R	2R	Q3	0 / 8	5–8	38%
French Open	Q1	Q1	Q2	1R	2R	2R	2R	3R	1R	2R	1R	2R	1R	0 / 10	7–10	41%
Wimbledon	A	Q2	A	Q3	A	1R	2R	2R	1R	2R	1R	2R	Q2	0 / 7	4–7	36%
US Open	A	Q1	Q3	Q3	2R	1R	2R	2R	2R	2R	A	1R	1R	0 / 8	5–8	38%
Win–loss	0–0	0–0	0–0	0–1	2–3	1–4	4–4	5–4	1–4	5–4	0–3	3–4	0–2	0 / 33	21–33	39%
ATP World Tour Masters 1000
Indian Wells Masters	A	A	A	A	Q1	1R	2R	1R	1R	2R	2R	A	A	0 / 6	3–6	33%
Miami Masters	A	A	A	A	A	3R	3R	A	1R	3R	1R	Q2	Q1	0 / 5	6–5	55%
Monte Carlo Masters	A	A	A	A	A	2R	1R	A	1R	2R	A	A	Q1	0 / 4	2–4	33%
Rome Masters	A	A	A	A	A	2R	Q2	A	1R	A	A	A	A	0 / 2	1–2	33%
Hamburg	A	A	A	A	A	2R	2R	A	Not Masters Series					0 / 2	2–2	50%
Madrid	NH	A	A	A	Q1	1R	A	1R	2R	A	A	A	A	0 / 3	1–3	25%
Canada Masters	A	A	A	A	2R	1R	A	A	1R	Q1	A	A	A	0 / 3	1–3	25%
Cincinnati Masters	A	A	A	A	Q2	3R	Q1	2R	1R	Q2	A	A	A	0 / 3	3–3	50%
Paris Masters	A	A	A	A	1R	1R	A	2R	Q2	2R	Q1	Q2	A	0 / 4	2–4	33%
Shanghai Masters	Not Masters Series								A	1R	Q1	A	A	0 / 1	0–1	–
Win–loss	0–0	0–0	0–0	0–0	1–2	7–9	4–4	2–4	1–7	5–5	1–2	0–0	0–0	0 / 33	21–33	39%

=== Doubles ===
Tournament	2004	2005	2006	2007	2008	2009	2010	2011	2012	2013	2014	2015	SR	W–L	Win%
Grand Slam tournaments
Australian Open	A	A	1R	2R	2R	1R	A	A	A	A	A	A	0 / 4	2–4	33%
French Open	1R	1R	1R	1R	1R	1R	A	A	1R	3R	1R	1R	0 / 10	2–10	17%
Wimbledon	A	A	1R	2R	1R	A	A	A	A	A	A	A	0 / 3	1–3	25%
US Open	A	A	1R	3R	A	1R	A	A	A	A	A	A	0 / 3	2–3	40%
Win–loss	0–1	0–1	0–4	4–4	1–3	0–3	0–0	0–0	0–1	2–1	0–1	0–1	0 / 20	7–20	26%
ATP World Tour Masters 1000
Miami	A	A	2R	A	A	A	A	A	A	A	A	A	0 / 1	1–1	50%
Win–loss	0–0	0–0	1–1	0–0	0–0	0–0	0–0	0–0	0–0	0–0	0–0	0–0	0 / 1	1–1	50%
