= Alessandria Challenger =

ATP Challenger Tour
- Event name: Alessandria
- Location: Alessandria, Italy
- Venue: Centro Sportivo Comunale "I. Barberis"
- Category: ATP Challenger Tour
- Surface: Clay (red)
- Draw: 32S/32Q/16D
- Prize money: €30,000+H
- Website: website

The Alessandria Challenger was a professional tennis tournament played on outdoor red clay courts. It was currently part of the Association of Tennis Professionals (ATP) Challenger Tour. It was held annually at the Centro Sportivo Comunale "I. Barberis" in Alessandria, Italy, since 2008.

== Past finals ==
=== Singles ===
Year	Champion	Runner-up	Score
2011	(Spain) Pablo Carreño Busta	(Spain) Roberto Bautista Agut	3–6, 6–3, 7–5
2010	(Germany) Björn Phau	(Argentina) Carlos Berlocq	7–6(6), 2–6, 6–2
2009	(Slovenia) Blaž Kavčič	(United States) Jesse Levine	7–5, 6–3
2008	(Italy) Paolo Lorenzi	(Italy) Simone Vagnozzi	4–6, 7–6(5), 7–6(4)

=== Doubles ===
Year	Champions	Runners-up	Score
2011	(Austria) Martin Fischer (Austria) Philipp Oswald	(South Africa) Jeff Coetzee (Sweden) Andreas Siljeström	6–7(5), 7–5, [10–6]
2010	(Croatia) Ivan Dodig (Croatia) Lovro Zovko	(Italy) Marco Crugnola (Spain) Daniel Muñoz de la Nava	6–4, 6–4
2009	(Spain) Rubén Ramírez Hidalgo (Spain) José Antonio Sánchez de Luna	(Argentina) Martín Alund (Chile) Guillermo Hormazábal	6–4, 6–2
2008	(Italy) Flavio Cipolla (Italy) Simone Vagnozzi	(Netherlands) Matwé Middelkoop (Netherlands) Melle van Gemerden	3–6, 6–1, 10–4
