= Albert Montañés =

Spanish tennis player (born 1980)

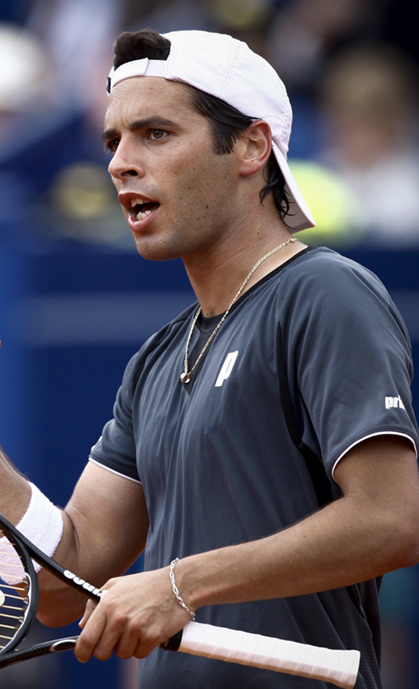
- Country (sports): Spain
- Born: 26 November 1980 (age 44) Sant Carles de la Ràpita, Spain
- Height: 1.75 m (5 ft 9 in)
- Turned pro: 1999
- Retired: 2017
- Plays: Right-handed (one-handed backhand)
- Prize money: $5,866,340

Singles
- Career record: 255–287
- Career titles: 6
- Highest ranking: No. 22 (2 August 2010)

Grand Slam singles results
- Australian Open: 3R (2010)
- French Open: 4R (2011)
- Wimbledon: 3R (2009, 2010)
- US Open: 4R (2010)

Doubles
- Career record: 60–121
- Career titles: 2
- Highest ranking: No. 73 (23 July 2007)

Grand Slam doubles results
- Australian Open: 2R (2010)
- French Open: 2R (2008)
- Wimbledon: 1R (2004, 2007, 2008, 2009, 2010, 2011)
- US Open: 2R (2009)
- Last updated on: 8 May 2017.

Albert Montañés Roca (Catalan: [əlˈβɛɾt muntəˈɲes ˈrɔkə], Spanish: [alˈβeɾ montaˈɲes ˈroka]; born 26 November 1980) is a Spanish former professional tennis player. He first entered the top 100 in 2001, achieved a career-high singles ranking of world No. 22 in 2010, and has won six singles titles and two doubles titles.

Montañés is one of very few players to win a title after saving match points in two different matches. He did it during his title run in Estoril 2009 in his quarterfinals and the final. He holds the record for most first-round exits at Grand Slam events; 35 reached at Wimbledon in 2016, beating Kenneth Carlsen's long standing record of 30 first-round exits. Montañés' career ended at the 2017 Barcelona Open, where he lost to countryman Feliciano López in the second round.

== ATP career finals ==
=== Singles: 11 (6 titles, 5 runner-ups) ===
Legend Grand Slam tournaments (0–0) ATP World Tour Finals (0–0) ATP World Tour Masters 1000 (0–0) ATP World Tour 500 Series (0–1) ATP World Tour 250 Series (6–4)	Titles by surface Hard (0–0) Clay (6–5) Grass (0–0) Carpet (0–0)	Titles by setting Outdoor (6–5) Indoor (0–0)

Result	W–L	Date	Tournament	Tier	Surface	Opponent	Score
Loss	0–1	Sep 2001	Romanian Open, Romania	International	Clay	(Morocco) Younes El Aynaoui	6–7^{(5–7)}, 6–7^{(2–7)}
Loss	0–2	Apr 2004	Valencia Open, Spain	International	Clay	(Spain) Fernando Verdasco	6–7^{(5–7)}, 3–6
Loss	0–3	Feb 2005	Mexican Open, Mexico	Intl. Gold	Clay	(Spain) Rafael Nadal	1–6, 0–6
Loss	0–4	Apr 2007	Grand Prix Hassan II, Morocco	International	Clay	(France) Paul-Henri Mathieu	1–6, 1–6
Win	1–4	Jul 2008	Dutch Open, Netherlands	International	Clay	(Belgium) Steve Darcis	1–6, 7–5, 6–3
Win	2–4	May 2009	Estoril Open, Portugal	250 Series	Clay	(United States) James Blake	5–7, 7–6^{(8–6)}, 6–0
Win	3–4	Sep 2009	Romanian Open, Romania	250 Series	Clay	(Argentina) Juan Mónaco	7–6^{(7–2)}, 7–6^{(8–6)}
Win	4–4	May 2010	Estoril Open, Portugal (2)	250 Series	Clay	(Portugal) Fred Gil	6–2, 6–7^{(4–7)}, 7–5
Win	5–4	Jul 2010	Stuttgart Open, Germany	250 Series	Clay	(France) Gaël Monfils	6–2, 1–2 ret.
Loss	5–5	Aug 2011	Austrian Open Kitzbühel, Austria	250 Series	Clay	(Netherlands) Robin Haase	4–6, 6–4, 1–6
Win	6–5	May 2013	Open de Nice Côte d'Azur, France	250 Series	Clay	(France) Gaël Monfils	6–0, 7–6^{(7–3)}

=== Doubles: 6 (2 titles, 4 runner-ups) ===
Legend Grand Slam tournaments (0–0) ATP World Tour Finals (0–0) ATP World Tour Masters 1000 (0–0) ATP World Tour 500 Series (0–0) ATP World Tour 250 Series (2–4)	Titles by surface Hard (1–0) Clay (1–4) Grass (0–0) Carpet (0–0)	Titles by setting Outdoor (2–4) Indoor (0–0)

Result	W–L	Date	Tournament	Tier	Surface	Partner	Opponents	Score
Loss	0–1	Feb 2007	Chile Open, Chile	International	Clay	(Spain) Rubén Ramírez Hidalgo	(Chile) Paul Capdeville (Spain) Óscar Hernández	6–4, 4–6, [6–10]
Loss	0–2	Feb 2007	Brasil Open, Brasil	International	Clay	(Spain) Rubén Ramírez Hidalgo	(Czech Republic) Lukáš Dlouhý (Czech Republic) Pavel Vízner	2–6, 6–7^{(4–7)}
Loss	0–3	Feb 2007	Argentina Open, Argentina	International	Clay	(Spain) Rubén Ramírez Hidalgo	(Argentina) Martín García (Argentina) Sebastián Prieto	4–6, 2–6
Loss	0–4	Feb 2008	Brasil Open, Brasil	International	Clay	(Spain) Santiago Ventura Bertomeu	(Brazil) Marcelo Melo (Brazil) André Sá	6–4, 2–6, [7–10]
Win	1–4	May 2008	Grand Prix Hassan II, Morocco	International	Clay	(Spain) Santiago Ventura Bertomeu	(United States) James Cerretani (Australia) Todd Perry	6–1, 6–2
Win	2–4	Jan 2010	Qatar Open, Qatar	250 Series	Hard	(Spain) Guillermo García López	(Czech Republic) František Čermák (Slovakia) Michal Mertiňák	6–4, 7–5

== Performance timelines ==
Key
W	F	SF	QF	#R	RR	Q#	P#	DNQ	A	Z#	PO	G	S	B	NMS	NTI	P	NH

(W) winner; (F) finalist; (SF) semifinalist; (QF) quarterfinalist; (#R) rounds 4, 3, 2, 1; (RR) round-robin stage; (Q#) qualification round; (P#) preliminary round; (DNQ) did not qualify; (A) absent; (Z#) Davis/Fed Cup Zonal Group (with number indication) or (PO) play-off; (G) gold, (S) silver or (B) bronze Olympic/Paralympic medal; (NMS) not a Masters tournament; (NTI) not a Tier I tournament; (P) postponed; (NH) not held; (SR) strike rate (events won / competed); (W–L) win–loss record.

=== Singles ===
Tournament	2001	2002	2003	2004	2005	2006	2007	2008	2009	2010	2011	2012	2013	2014	2015	2016	W–L
Grand Slam tournaments
Australian Open	A	1R	2R	1R	1R	1R	1R	1R	1R	3R	2R	1R	1R	1R	A	A	4–13
French Open	3R	3R	1R	A	2R	3R	3R	2R	1R	3R	4R	1R	2R	1R	Q2	1R	16–14
Wimbledon	A	1R	1R	2R	1R	1R	1R	2R	3R	3R	1R	1R	1R	A	Q1	1R	6–13
US Open	A	1R	1R	1R	2R	1R	1R	1R	1R	4R	1R	1R	1R	1R	Q3	Q2	4–13
Win–loss	2–1	2–4	1–4	1–3	2–4	2–4	2–4	2–4	2–4	9–4	4–4	0–4	1–4	0–3	0–0	0–2	30–53
ATP World Tour Masters 1000
Indian Wells Masters	A	A	A	A	A	A	A	1R	2R	3R	4R	A	A	A	A	A	4–4
Miami Masters	A	2R	1R	A	A	2R	1R	2R	2R	2R	2R	A	A	2R	A	A	5–9
Monte-Carlo Masters	A	1R	A	A	2R	A	A	Q2	3R	QF	2R	2R	2R	2R	Q2	A	10–8
Rome Masters	A	3R	A	A	1R	A	2R	A	2R	1R	1R	Q1	2R	Q1	A	A	5–7
Madrid ^{1}	A	1R	A	A	A	A	A	QF	1R	1R	1R	1R	A	A	A	Q1	3–6
Canada Masters	A	A	A	A	A	A	A	A	A	A	1R	A	A	A	A	A	0–1
Cincinnati Masters	A	A	A	A	A	A	A	A	A	A	1R	A	A	A	A	A	0–1
Shanghai ^{2}	A	A	A	A	A	A	1R	1R	A	1R	2R	A	1R	A	A	A	1–5
Paris Masters	A	A	A	A	A	A	1R	A	2R	1R	A	A	A	A	A	A	1–3
Win–loss	0–0	3–4	0–1	0–0	1–2	1–1	1–4	4–4	6–6	4–7	5–8	1–2	2–3	2–2	0–0	0–0	30–44
Career statistics
Titles–Finals	0–1	0–0	0–0	0–1	0–1	0–0	0–1	1–1	2–2	2–2	0–1	0–0	0–1	0–0	0–0	0–0	6–11
Year-end ranking	65	78	81	99	71	85	46	45	31	25	53	96	63	108	116	164	

^{1} Held as Hamburg Masters (outdoor clay) until 2008, Madrid Masters (outdoor clay) 2009–present.
^{2} Held as Stuttgart Masters (indoor hard) until 2001, Madrid Masters (indoor hard) from 2002 to 2008, and Shanghai Masters (outdoor hard) 2009–present.

=== Doubles ===
Tournament	2003	2004	2005	2006	2007	2008	2009	2010	2011	2012	2013	W–L
Grand Slam tournaments
Australian Open	1R	A	A	1R	A	1R	1R	2R	1R	1R	A	1–7
French Open	A	1R	A	A	1R	2R	1R	1R	1R	1R	A	1–7
Wimbledon	A	1R	A	A	1R	1R	1R	1R	1R	A	A	0–6
US Open	A	A	A	1R	1R	1R	2R	1R	1R	A	2R	2–7
Win–loss	0–1	0–2	0–0	0–2	0–3	1–4	1–4	1–4	0–4	0–2	1–1	4–27

== Top 10 Wins per season ==
Season	1999	2000	2001	2002	2003	2004	2005	2006	2007	2008	2009	2010	2011	2012	2013	2014	2015	2016	2017	Total
Wins	0	0	0	1	0	0	0	0	1	0	1	2	0	0	1	0	0	0	0	6

=== Wins over Top 10s per season ===
#	Player	Rank	Event	Surface	Rd	Score
2002
1.	(Brazil) Gustavo Kuerten	2	Rome, Italy	Clay	2R	6–4, 3–6, 6–1
2007
2.	(Chile) Fernando González	5	Viña del Mar, Chile	Clay	QF	6–3, 3–6, 6–4
2009
3.	(France) Gilles Simon	8	Estoril, Portugal	Clay	QF	5–7, 6–4, 7–6^{(7–4)}
2010
4.	(Croatia) Marin Čilić	9	Monte-Carlo, Monaco	Clay	3R	6–4, 6–4
5.	(Switzerland) Roger Federer	1	Estoril, Portugal	Clay	SF	6–2, 7–6^{(7–5)}
2013
6.	(France) Richard Gasquet	9	Umag, Croatia	Clay	2R	6–4, 6–4
