= José Antonio Sánchez de Luna =

Spanish tennis player (born 1984)

- Country (sports): Spain
- Residence: Alicante, Spain
- Born: 18 October 1984 (age 40); Granada, Spain
- Plays: Right-handed
- Prize money: $115,638

Singles
- Career record: 0-3
- Career titles: 0
- Highest ranking: No. 246 (7 July 2008)
- Current ranking: No. 519 (19 April 2010)

Grand Slam singles results
- Australian Open: -
- French Open: -
- Wimbledon: -
- US Open: -

Doubles
- Career titles: 0
- Last updated on: April 19, 2010.

José Antonio Sánchez de Luna (Spanish pronunciation: [xose anˈtonjo ˈsantʃeθ ðe ˈluna]; born October 18, 1984) is a former Spanish professional tennis player. He is currently director of the NES Campus Tennis Club in Granada, and works with youth sports education programmes.

== ATP tournaments finals ==
=== Titles (6) ===
Legend
ITF Futures Serie (6)

No.	Date	Tournament	Surface	Opponent	Score
1.	28.07.2003	Spain F16, Spain	Clay	(Portugal) Rui Machado	6–3, 6–2
2.	26.04.2004	Italy F5, Italy	Clay	(Belgium) Steve Darcis	6–3, 6–7^{(6–8)}, 7–6^{(10–8)}
3.	03.05.2004	Italy F6, Italy	Clay	(Argentina) Andres Dellatorre	6–2, 4–6, 3–6
4.	01.08.2005	Spain F18, Spain	Clay	(France) Augustin Gensse	5–7, 2–6
5.	22.08.2005	Spain F21, Spain	Clay	(Spain) José Checa-Calvo	6–7^{(5–7)}, 6–4, 6–7^{(6–8)}
6.	13.02.2006	Spain F6, Spain	Clay	(Romania) Victor Crivoi	2–6, 4–6
7.	22.05.2006	Italy F15, Italy	Clay	(Netherlands) Melvyn op der Heijde	7–6^{(7–2)}, 6–0
8.	02.07.2007	Spain F25, Spain	Clay	(Spain) Pere Riba	4–6, 6–3, 7–5
9.	20.08.2007	Spain F32, Spain	Clay	(Spain) Miguel Ángel López Jaén	4–6, 6–2, 4–6
10.	08.10.2007	Portugal F5, Portugal	Clay	(Argentina) Cristian Villagrán	6–3, 6–2
11.	20.04.2009	Spain F13, Spain	Clay	(Spain) Ignacio Coll-Riudavets	6–7^{(6–7)}, 5–7
12.	27.04.2009	Spain F14, Spain	Clay	(Poland) Adam Chadaj	6–4, 6–3
13.	04.05.2009	Spain F15, Spain	Clay	(Spain) Albert Ramos-Viñolas	2–6, 6–3, 4–6
