= 2010 U.S. Men's Clay Court Championships =

- Date: April 5 – 11
- Edition: 42nd
- Category: World Tour 250
- Draw: 28S / 16D
- Prize money: $442,500
- Surface: Clay / outdoor
- Location: Houston, TX, United States
- Venue: River Oaks Country Club

Champions

Singles
- (Argentina) Juan Ignacio Chela

Doubles
- (United States) Bob Bryan / (United States) Mike Bryan
← 2009 ·	U.S. Men's Clay Court Championships	· 2011 →

The 2010 U.S. Men's Clay Court Championships was a men's tennis tournament played on outdoor clay courts. It was the 42nd edition of the U.S. Men's Clay Court Championships, and was an ATP World Tour 250 event. It took place at River Oaks Country Club in Houston, Texas, United States, from April 5 through April 11, 2010. Unseeded Juan Ignacio Chela won the singles title.

== Entrants ==
=== Seeds ===
Athlete	Nationality	Ranking*	Seeding
Fernando González	Chile	11	1
John Isner	United States	21	2
Sam Querrey	United States	25	3
Lleyton Hewitt	Australia	27	4
Evgeny Korolev	Kazakhstan	56	5
Horacio Zeballos	Argentina	58	6
Eduardo Schwank	Argentina	64	7
Michael Russell	United States	68	8

- Rankings and seedings are as of March 22.

=== Other entrants ===
The following players received wildcards into the main draw:

- (Australia) Lleyton Hewitt
- (Poland) Jerzy Janowicz
- (United States) Donald Young

The following players received entry via qualifying:

- (South Africa) Kevin Anderson
- (Australia) Nick Lindahl
- (Republic of Ireland) Conor Niland
- (United States) Ryan Sweeting

== Finals ==
=== Singles ===
(Argentina) Juan Ignacio Chela defeated (United States) Sam Querrey, 5–7, 6–4, 6–3

- It was Chela's first title of the year and 5th of his career.

=== Doubles ===
(United States) Bob Bryan / (United States) Mike Bryan defeated (Australia) Stephen Huss / (South Africa) Wesley Moodie, 6–3, 7–5
