= 2001 AIG Japan Open Tennis Championships – Men's doubles =

Men's doubles
- 2001 AIG Japan Open Tennis Championships

Final
- Champions: (United States) Rick Leach (Australia) David Macpherson
- Runners-up: (Australia) Paul Hanley (Australia) Nathan Healey
- Score: 1–6, 7–6^{(8–6)}, 7–6^{(7–4)}

Details
- Draw: 28 (5WC)
- Seeds: 8

Events
| Singles | men | women |
| Doubles | men | women |
- AIG Japan Open Tennis Championships

Mahesh Bhupathi and Leander Paes were the defending champions but did not compete that year.

Rick Leach and David Macpherson won in the final 1–6, 7–6^{(8–6)}, 7–6^{(7–4)} against Paul Hanley and Nathan Healey.

== Seeds ==
The top five seeded teams received byes into the second round.

1. (Australia) ~~Wayne Arthurs / (Australia) Todd Woodbridge~~ (withdrew)
2. (Japan) Thomas Shimada / (South Africa) Myles Wakefield (quarterfinals)
3. (United States) Rick Leach / (Australia) David Macpherson (champions)
4. (South Africa) John-Laffnie de Jager / (South Africa) Robbie Koenig (quarterfinals)
5. (Sweden) Simon Aspelin / (Australia) Andrew Kratzmann (second round)
6. (South Africa) Brent Haygarth / (Netherlands) Sjeng Schalken (first round)
7. (United States) Justin Gimelstob / (United States) Scott Humphries (first round)
8. (Sweden) Johan Landsberg / (United States) Jack Waite (first round)
9. (Zimbabwe) Byron Black / (South Africa) Neville Godwin (semifinals)

== Draw ==
Key

- Q = Qualifier
- WC = Wild card
- LL = Lucky loser
- Alt = Alternate
- ITF = ITF entry
- PR = Protected ranking
- SR = Special ranking
- SE = Special exempt
- JE = Junior exempt
- JR = Junior Accelerator Programme entrant
- CO = College Accelerator Programme entrant
- NG = Next Gen Accelerator Program entrant
- w/o = Walkover
- r = Retired
- d = Defaulted

=== Final ===
Semifinals

Final

- (Australia) Paul Hanley
- (Australia) Nathan Healey
7
6

9
- (Zimbabwe) Byron Black
- (South Africa) Neville Godwin
5
2

- (Australia) Paul Hanley
- (Australia) Nathan Healey
6
6^{6}
6^{4}

3
- (United States) Rick Leach
- (Australia) David Macpherson
1
7^{8}
7^{7}

3
- (United States) Rick Leach
- (Australia) David Macpherson
6
6

- (Australia) Stephen Huss
- (Australia) Lee Pearson
3
1

=== Top half ===
First round

Second round

Quarterfinals

Semifinals

5
- (Sweden) S Aspelin
- (Australia) A Kratzmann
3
2

- (Israel) N Behr
- (Switzerland) M Kratochvil
3
6
0

- (Australia) P Hanley
- (Australia) N Healey
6
6

- (Australia) P Hanley
- (Australia) N Healey
6
3
6

- (Australia) P Hanley
- (Australia) N Healey
6
6

- (United States) J Blake
- (The Bahamas) M Merklein
6
6

- (Australia) T Crichton
- (France) M Llodra
4
4

WC
- (Japan) J Miyao
- (Japan) Y Miyazaki
2
3

- (United States) J Blake
- (The Bahamas) M Merklein
3
2

- (Australia) T Crichton
- (France) M Llodra
7^{7}
6

- (Australia) T Crichton
- (France) M Llodra
6
6

6
- (South Africa) B Haygarth
- (Netherlands) S Schalken
6^{5}
1

- (Australia) P Hanley
- (Australia) N Healey
7
6

9
- (Zimbabwe) B Black
- (South Africa) N Godwin
5
2

4
- (South Africa) J-L de Jager
- (South Africa) R Koenig
4
6
6

WC
- (Thailand) P Srichaphan
- (Japan) T Suzuki
6^{1}
6
1

- (United States) D Bowen
- (Australia) A Fisher
6
3
2

- (United States) D Bowen
- (Australia) A Fisher
7^{7}
4
6

4
- (South Africa) J-L de Jager
- (South Africa) R Koenig
6^{3}
3

WC
- (Japan) G Motomura
- (Japan) M Onoda
6
4
6

9
- (Zimbabwe) B Black
- (South Africa) N Godwin
7^{7}
6

WC
- (Japan) S Iwabuchi
- (Japan) H Kondo
3
6
4

WC
- (Japan) G Motomura
- (Japan) M Onoda
1
3

- (Israel) H Levy
- (Brazil) A Sá
0
2

9
- (Zimbabwe) B Black
- (South Africa) N Godwin
6
6

9
- (Zimbabwe) B Black
- (South Africa) N Godwin
6
6

=== Bottom half ===
First round

Second round

Quarterfinals

Semifinals

8
- (Sweden) J Landsberg
- (United States) J Waite
1
4

- (United States) E Taino
- (United States) J Thomas
6
6

- (United States) E Taino
- (United States) J Thomas
4
6
3

WC
- (Japan) Y Ishii
- (Japan) T Terachi
5
6^{1}

- (Netherlands) S Groen
- (Australia) T Perry
6
3
6

- (Netherlands) S Groen
- (Australia) T Perry
7
7^{7}

- (Netherlands) S Groen
- (Australia) T Perry
5
6^{2}

- (Switzerland) I Heuberger
- (Germany) R Schüttler
4
4

3
- (United States) R Leach
- (Australia) D Macpherson
7
7^{7}

- (United Kingdom) B Cowan
- (Georgia (country)) I Labadze
6
6

- (United Kingdom) B Cowan
- (Georgia (country)) I Labadze
6^{5}
4

3
- (United States) R Leach
- (Australia) D Macpherson
7^{7}
6

3
- (United States) R Leach
- (Australia) D Macpherson
6
6

7
- (United States) J Gimelstob
- (United States) S Humphries
3
7^{11}
1

- (Australia) S Huss
- (Australia) L Pearson
3
1

- (Australia) S Huss
- (Australia) L Pearson
6
6^{9}
6

- (Australia) S Huss
- (Australia) L Pearson
6^{4}
6
7^{8}

- (Czech Republic) P Luxa
- (Czech Republic) D Vacek
6
7

- (Czech Republic) P Luxa
- (Czech Republic) D Vacek
7^{7}
4
6^{6}

- (Czech Republic) O Fukárek
- (Germany) M-K Goellner
3
5

- (Australia) S Huss
- (Australia) L Pearson
3
6
6

- (Germany) K Braasch
- (Germany) L Burgsmüller
6^{5}
3

2
- (Japan) T Shimada
- (South Africa) M Wakefield
6
3
3

- (Australia) W Arthurs
- (United States) M Russell
7^{7}
6

- (Australia) W Arthurs
- (United States) M Russell
2
6
4

2
- (Japan) T Shimada
- (South Africa) M Wakefield
6
4
6
