= Philipp Marx =

German tennis player

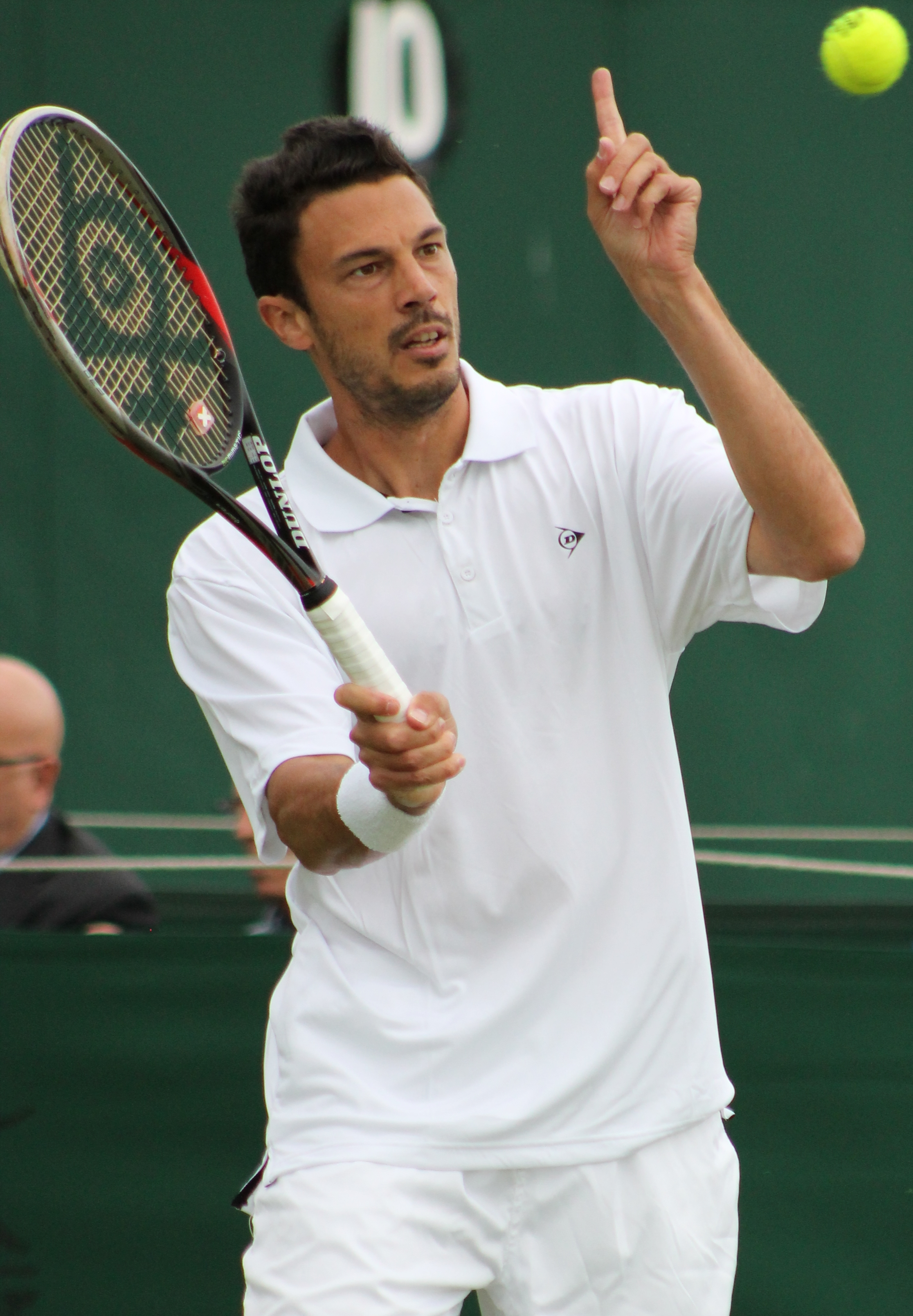
- Country (sports): Germany
- Residence: Seeheim-Jugenheim, Germany
- Born: 3 February 1982 (age 44) Biedenkopf, Germany
- Height: 1.88 m (6 ft 2 in)
- Turned pro: 2001
- Retired: 2016
- Plays: Right-handed (one-handed backhand)
- Prize money: US $466,198

Singles
- Career record: 0–0
- Career titles: 0
- Highest ranking: No. 300 (3 April 2006)

Doubles
- Career record: 49–81
- Career titles: 0
- Highest ranking: No. 53 (27 September 2010)

Grand Slam doubles results
- Australian Open: 3R (2010)
- French Open: 2R (2011, 2013)
- Wimbledon: QF (2011)
- US Open: 2R (2010, 2011)

Philipp Marx (German pronunciation: [ˈfiːlɪp ˈmaʁks]; born 3 February 1982) is a German former professional tennis player. Marx competes on the ATP Challenger Tour and the ATP World Tour, both in singles and doubles. He reached his highest ATP singles ranking No. 300 achieved on 3 April 2006 and his highest ATP doubles ranking achieved No. 53 on 27 September 2010.

== ATP career finals ==
=== Doubles: 2 (2 runners-up) ===
Legend (pre/post 2009) Grand Slam Tournaments (0–0) ATP World Tour Finals (0–0) ATP World Tour Masters 1000 (0–0) ATP World Tour 500 Series (0–0) ATP World Tour 250 Series (0–2)	Finals by surface Hard (0–2) Clay (0–0) Grass (0–0) Carpet (0–0)

Outcome	No.	Date	Tournament	Surface	Partner	Opponents	Score
Runner-up	1.	28 February 2010	Delray Beach Open, United States	Hard	(Slovakia) Igor Zelenay	(United States) Bob Bryan (United States) Mike Bryan	3–6, 6–7^{(3–7)}
Runner-up	2.	9 February 2014	Zagreb Indoors, Croatia	Hard (i)	(Slovakia) Michal Mertiňák	(Netherlands) Jean-Julien Rojer (Romania) Horia Tecău	6–3, 4–6, [2–10]

== Futures and Challenger finals: 69 (29–40) ==
=== Singles: 6 (2–4) ===
Legend
Challengers (0–0)
Futures (2–4)

Outcome	No.	Date	Tournament	Surface	Opponent	Score
Winner	1.	September 16, 2002	Montego Bay, Jamaica	Hard	(Australia) Adam Kennedy	6–4, 3–6, 6–3
Runner-up	1.	January 5, 2004	Nußloch, Germany	Carpet (i)	(Kazakhstan) Yuri Schukin	6–7^{(3)}, 6–4, 6–4
Runner-up	2.	September 19, 2005	Plaisir, France	Hard (i)	(Switzerland) Roman Valent	6–4, 7–6^{(4)}
Winner	2.	March 16, 2006	Oberentfelden, Switzerland	Carpet (i)	(Switzerland) Benjamin Rufer	6–1, 6–2
Runner-up	3.	January 15, 2007	Stuttgart, Germany	Hard (i)	(Czech Republic) Daniel Lustig	7–6^{(2)}, 7–6^{(7)}
Runner-up	4.	April 9, 2007	Norrköping, Sweden	Hard (i)	(Sweden) Carl Bergman	4–6, 6–3, 7–5

=== Doubles: 63 (27–36) ===
Legend
Challengers (16–22)
Futures (11–14)

Outcome	No.	Date	Tournament	Surface	Partner	Opponents	Score
Winner	1.	June 23, 2003	Leun, Germany	Clay (red)	(Germany) Markus Dickhardt	(Belarus) Vitali Chvets (Germany) Thomas Schöck	walkover
Runner-up	1.	September 1, 2003	Oviedo, Spain	Clay (red)	(Spain) Esteban Carril	(Spain) Roberto Menéndez (Spain) Gabriel Trujillo Soler	4–6, 6–4, 7–5
Winner	2.	January 17, 2005	Oberhaching, Germany	Hard (i)	(Poland) Adam Chadaj	(Germany) Peter Steinberger (Germany) Marcel Zimmermann	6–4, 6–3
Runner-up	2.	March 14, 2005	Poitiers, France	Hard (i)	(Germany) Denis Gremelmayr	(France) Nicolas Renavand (France) Nicolas Tourte	6–1, 5–7, 6–3
Runner-up	3.	June 20, 2005	Alkmaar, Netherlands	Clay (red)	(Germany) Denis Gremelmayr	(Belgium) Dominique Coene (Belgium) Stefan Wauters	7–5, 6–1
Winner	3.	September 19, 2005	Plaisir, France	Hard (i)	(Australia) Rameez Junaid	(United States) Eric Butorac (United States) Chris Drake	7–5, 6–4
Runner-up	4.	January 2, 2006	Nußloch, Germany	Carpet (i)	(Germany) Torsten Popp	(Denmark) Frederik Nielsen (Denmark) Rasmus Nørby	6–3, 7–6^{(3)}
Runner-up	5.	January 9, 2006	Stuttgart, Germany	Hard (i)	(Germany) Torsten Popp	(Switzerland) Stéphane Bohli (Russia) Artem Sitak	6–3, 7–5
Runner-up	6.	May 1, 2006	Ostrava, Czech Republic	Clay (red)	(Germany) Torsten Popp	(Czech Republic) Jaroslav Pospíšil (Czech Republic) Pavel Šnobel	6–4, 6–7^{(3)}, [10–6]
Winner	4.	May 15, 2006	Mishref, Kuwait	Hard	(Germany) Ralph Grambow	(Kuwait) Mohammad Ghareeb (India) Ravishankar Pathanjali	4–6, 7–6^{(5)}, 6–3
Runner-up	7.	June 5, 2006	Fürth, Germany	Clay (red)	(Germany) Torsten Popp	(Greece) Vasilis Mazarakis (Chile) Felipe Parada	6–3, 6–2
Runner-up	8.	July 3, 2006	Kassel, Germany	Clay (red)	(Australia) Rameez Junaid	(Germany) Gero Kretschmer (Australia) Clint Thomson	7–6^{(5)}, 6–2
Runner-up	9.	September 4, 2006	Kempten im Allgäu, Germany	Clay (red)	(Australia) Rameez Junaid	(Austria) Martin Fischer (Austria) Philipp Oswald	6–3, 1–6, 7–6^{(1)}
Runner-up	10.	September 25, 2006	Sarreguemines, France	Carpet (i)	(Germany) Benjamin Ebrahimzadeh	(Germany) Daniel Muller (Germany) Daniel Stöhr	7–5, 6–3
Winner	5.	October 9, 2006	Jersey, Channel Islands	Hard (i)	(Germany) David Klier	(Czech Republic) Ladislav Chramosta (India) Navdeep Singh	6–2, 6–4
Runner-up	11.	October 16, 2006	Glasgow, United Kingdom	Hard (i)	(Poland) Dawid Olejniczak	(United Kingdom) Joshua Goodall (United Kingdom) Ross Hutchins	7–6^{(2)}, 7–5
Winner	6.	November 20, 2006	Shrewsbury, United Kingdom	Hard (i)	(Denmark) Frederik Nielsen	(Germany) Lars Burgsmüller (Germany) Mischa Zverev	6–4, 6–4
Winner	7.	January 8, 2007	Nußloch, Germany	Carpet (i)	(Romania) Florin Mergea	(Poland) Tomasz Bednarek (Germany) Frank Moser	6–3, 7–5
Runner-up	12.	January 15, 2007	Stuttgart, Germany	Hard (i)	(Germany) Lars Uebel	(Germany) David Klier (Germany) Daniel Muller	7–5, 4–6, 6–1
Winner	8.	April 2, 2007	Linköping, Sweden	Hard (i)	(Germany) Ralph Grambow	(Sweden) Jerry Sundgren (Sweden) Martin Taipale	6–0, 6–2
Winner	9.	April 9, 2007	Norrköping, Sweden	Hard (i)	(Germany) Ralph Grambow	(Italy) Riccardo Ghedin (France) Pierrick Ysern	3–6, 7–6^{(7)}, 6–4
Winner	10.	July 2, 2007	Kassel, Germany	Clay (red)	(Germany) Lars Pörschke	(Germany) Marcello Craca (Germany) Dieter Kindlmann	6–4, 6–4
Winner	11.	September 3, 2007	Düsseldorf, Germany	Clay (red)	(Italy) Fabio Colangelo	(Slovakia) Filip Polášek (Slovakia) Igor Zelenay	3–6, 6–3, [10–7]
Winner	12.	November 5, 2007	Eckental, Germany	Carpet (i)	(Germany) Lars Uebel	(Germany) Philipp Petzschner (Austria) Alexander Peya	6–3, 6–4
Runner-up	13.	January 7, 2008	Nußloch, Germany	Carpet (i)	(Germany) Lars Uebel	(Netherlands) Fred Hemmes Jr. (Netherlands) Michel Koning	7–6^{(7)}, 6–3
Runner-up	14.	January 14, 2008	Stuttgart, Germany	Hard (i)	(Germany) Lars Uebel	(Switzerland) Alexander Sadecky (South Africa) Izak van der Merwe	6–1, 6–4
Winner	13.	April 7, 2008	Angers, France	Clay (red)	(Germany) Lars Uebel	(France) Olivier Charroin (Monaco) Thomas Oger	6–7^{(6)}, 6–3, [10–8]
Winner	14.	June 2, 2008	Fürth, Germany	Clay (red)	(Austria) Alexander Peya	(Austria) Daniel Köllerer (Germany) Frank Moser	6–3, 6–3
Winner	15.	June 30, 2008	Lugano, Switzerland	Clay (red)	(Australia) Rameez Junaid	(Argentina) Mariano Hood (Argentina) Eduardo Schwank	7–6^{(7)}, 4–6, [10–7]
Winner	16.	July 7, 2008	Scheveningen, Netherlands	Clay (red)	(Australia) Rameez Junaid	(Netherlands) Matwé Middelkoop (Netherlands) Melle van Gemerden	5–7, 6–2, [10–6]
Runner-up	15.	July 21, 2008	City of San Marino, San Marino	Clay (red)	(Italy) Fabio Colangelo	(Switzerland) Yves Allegro (Romania) Horia Tecău	7–5, 7–5
Runner-up	16.	August 18, 2008	Geneva, Switzerland	Clay (red)	(Australia) Rameez Junaid	(Austria) Daniel Köllerer (Germany) Frank Moser	7–6^{(5)}, 3–6, [10–8]
Winner	17.	September 1, 2008	Alphen aan den Rijn, Netherlands	Clay (red)	(Australia) Rameez Junaid	(Netherlands) Bart Beks (Netherlands) Matwé Middelkoop	6–3, 6–2
Runner-up	17.	September 8, 2008	Ljubljana, Slovenia	Clay (red)	(Australia) Rameez Junaid	(Argentina) Juan Pablo Brzezicki (Argentina) Mariano Hood	7–5, 7–6^{(4)}
Runner-up	18.	September 15, 2008	Banja Luka, Bosnia and Herzegovina	Clay (red)	(Australia) Rameez Junaid	(Hungary) Attila Balázs (Israel) Amir Hadad	7–5, 6–2
Runner-up	19.	January 5, 2009	Schwieberdingen, Germany	Carpet (i)	(Germany) David Klier	(Latvia) Andis Juška (Czech Republic) Lukáš Rosol	6–1, 6–4
Runner-up	20.	January 12, 2009	Stuttgart, Germany	Hard (i)	(Germany) David Klier	(Germany) Bastian Knittel (Russia) Konstantin Kravchuk	1–6, 7–6^{(1)}, [10–4]
Winner	18.	February 16, 2009	Belgrade, Serbia	Carpet (i)	(Germany) Michael Kohlmann	(Pakistan) Aisam-ul-Haq Qureshi (Croatia) Lovro Zovko	3–6, 6–2, [10–8]
Runner-up	21.	March 9, 2009	Rabat, Morocco	Clay (red)	(Germany) Michael Kohlmann	(Spain) Rubén R. Hidalgo (Spain) Santiago Ventura	6–4, 7–6^{(5)}
Winner	19.	April 6, 2009	Athens, Greece	Carpet (i)	(Australia) Rameez Junaid	(Netherlands) Jesse Huta Galung (Portugal) Rui Machado	6–4, 6–3
Winner	20.	May 25, 2009	Karlsruhe, Germany	Clay (red)	(Australia) Rameez Junaid	(Poland) Tomasz Bednarek (Pakistan) Aisam-ul-Haq Qureshi	7–5, 6–4
Runner-up	22.	November 2, 2009	Eckental, Germany	Carpet (i)	(Slovakia) Igor Zelenay	(Germany) Michael Kohlmann (Austria) Alexander Peya	6–4, 7–6^{(4)}
Runner-up	23.	November 9, 2009	Aachen, Germany	Carpet (i)	(Slovakia) Igor Zelenay	(India) Rohan Bopanna (Pakistan) Aisam-ul-Haq Qureshi	6–4, 7–6^{(6)}
Winner	21.	November 16, 2009	Bratislava, Slovakia	Hard (i)	(Slovakia) Igor Zelenay	(Czech Republic) Leoš Friedl (Czech Republic) David Škoch	6–4, 6–4
Winner	22.	November 30, 2009	Salzburg, Austria	Hard (i)	(Slovakia) Igor Zelenay	(Thailand) Sanchai Ratiwatana (Thailand) Sonchat Ratiwatana	6–4, 7–5
Runner-up	24.	July 5, 2010	Scheveningen, Netherlands	Clay	(Australia) Rameez Junaid	(Brazil) Franco Ferreiro (India) Harsh Mankad	6–4, 3–6, [10–7]
Runner-up	25.	September 13, 2010	Szczecin, Poland	Clay (red)	(Australia) Rameez Junaid	(Jamaica) Dustin Brown (Netherlands) Rogier Wassen	6–4, 7–5
Runner-up	26.	August 12, 2012	Cordenos, Italy	Clay	(Romania) Florin Mergea	(Czech Republic) Lukáš Dlouhý (Slovakia) Michal Mertiňák	7–5, 5–7, [7–10]
Winner	23.	September 1, 2012	Como, Italy	Clay	(Romania) Florin Mergea	(Australia) Colin Ebelthite (Czech Republic) Jaroslav Pospíšil	6–4, 4–6, [10–4]
Winner	24.	October 14, 2012	Rennes, France	Hard	(Romania) Florin Mergea	(Poland) Tomasz Bednarek (Poland) Mateusz Kowalczyk	6–3, 6–2
Runner-up	27.	November 4, 2012	Geneva, Switzerland	Clay	(Romania) Florin Mergea	(Sweden) Johan Brunström (South Africa) Raven Klaasen	6–7^{(2–7)}, 7–6^{(7–5)}, [5–10]
Runner-up	28.	November 10, 2012	Bratislava, Slovakia	Hard	(Romania) Florin Mergea	(Czech Republic) Lukáš Dlouhý (Russia) Mikhail Elgin	7–6^{(7–5)}, 2–6, [6–10]
Winner	25.	20 January 2013	Stuttgart, Germany	Hard (i)	(Romania) Florin Mergea	(Republic of Ireland) James Cluskey (Germany) Alexander Satschko	6–2, 6–2
Runner-up	29.	March 3, 2013	Cherbourg, France	Hard	(Romania) Florin Mergea	(Thailand) Sanchai Ratiwatana (Thailand) Sonchat Ratiwatana	5–7, 4–6
Runner-up	30.	24 March 2013	Rimouski, Canada	Hard	(Romania) Florin Mergea	(Australia) Samuel Groth (Australia) John-Patrick Smith	6–7^{(5–7)}, 6–7^{(7–9)}
Runner-up	31.	31 March 2013	Le Gosier, Guadeloupe	Hard	(Romania) Florin Mergea	(Israel) Dudi Sela (Chinese Taipei) Jimmy Wang	1–6, 2–6
Runner-up	32.	12 May 2013	Rome, Italy	Clay	(Romania) Florin Mergea	(Germany) Andre Begemann (Germany) Martin Emmrich	6–7^{(4–7)}, 3–6
Runner-up	33.	18 August 2013	Meerbusch, Germany	Clay	(Germany) Dustin Brown	(Australia) Rameez Junaid (Germany) Frank Moser	3–6, 6–7^{(4–7)}
Winner	26.	3 November 2013	Eckental, Germany	Carpet (i)	(Germany) Dustin Brown	(Poland) Piotr Gadomski (Poland) Mateusz Kowalczyk	7–6^{(7–4)}, 6–2
Runner-up	34.	17 November 2013	Helsinki, Finland	Hard (i)	(Germany) Dustin Brown	(Finland) Henri Kontinen (Finland) Jarkko Nieminen	5–7, 7–5, [5–10]
Runner-up	35.	6 April 2014	St. Brieuc, France	Hard (i)	(Russia) Victor Baluda	(Germany) Dominik Meffert (Germany) Tim Pütz	4–6, 3–6
Winner	27.	12 October 2014	Rennes, France	Hard (i)	(Germany) Tobias Kamke	(Czech Republic) František Čermák (Israel) Jonathan Erlich	3–6, 6–2, [10–3]
Runner-up	36.	9 November 2014	Mouilleron Le Captif, France	Hard (i)	(Germany) Tobias Kamke	(France) Pierre-Hugues Herbert (France) Nicolas Mahut	3–6, 4–6

== Doubles performance timeline ==
Key
W	F	SF	QF	#R	RR	Q#	DNQ	A	NH

(W) winner; (F) finalist; (SF) semifinalist; (QF) quarterfinalist; (#R) rounds 4, 3, 2, 1; (RR) round-robin stage; (Q#) qualification round; (DNQ) did not qualify; (A) absent; (NH) not held; (SR) strike rate (events won / competed); (W–L) win–loss record.
To avoid confusion and double counting, these charts are updated at the conclusion of a tournament or when the player's participation has ended.

Tournament	2008	2009	2010	2011	2012	2013	2014	2015	2016	SR	W–L
Grand Slam tournaments
Australian Open	A	A	3R	2R	2R	A	A	A	A	0 / 3	4–3
French Open	A	A	1R	2R	1R	2R	1R	A	A	0 / 5	2–5
Wimbledon	A	2R	2R	QF	2R	1R	Q1	A	Q2	0 / 5	6–5
US Open	A	A	2R	2R	A	A	1R	A	A	0 / 3	2–3
Win–loss	0–0	1–1	4–4	6–4	2–3	1–2	0–2	0–0	0–0	0 / 16	14–16
Career statistics
Titles / Finals	0 / 0	0 / 0	0 / 1	0 / 0	0 / 0	0 / 0	0 / 1	0 / 0	0 / 0	0 / 2	
Overall win–loss	0–1	2–5	15–17	13–17	9–17	5–12	5–10	0–0	0–2	49–81	
Year-end ranking	109	75	68	64	81	84	98	–	1216	38%	
