= Lee Pearson (tennis) =

Australian tennis player

- Full name: Lee Pearson
- Country (sports): Australia
- Born: 6 September 1976 (age 48)
- Prize money: $58,600

Singles
- Highest ranking: No. 341 (29 May 2000)

Doubles
- Career record: 3–9
- Highest ranking: No. 123 (15 October 2001)

Grand Slam doubles results
- Australian Open: 1R (2001, 2002)
- US Open: 1R (2002)

Lee Pearson (born 6 September 1976) is a former professional tennis player from Australia.

== Biography ==
Pearson, who grew up in Victoria, played collegiate tennis at Auburn University in the United States.

In the early 2000s he competed on the professional circuit as a doubles specialist, winning four Challenger doubles titles. Most of his appearances on the ATP Tour were with Auburn teammate Stephen Huss, which included making the semi-finals of the 2001 Japan Open.

He made his grand slam main draw debut at the 2001 Australian Open, where he was a wildcard pairing with Matthew Breen. In 2002 he partnered with Stephen Huss to play in the main draw of both the Australian Open and US Open.

== Challenger titles ==
=== Doubles: (4) ===
No.	Year	Tournament	Surface	Partner	Opponents	Score
1.	2000	Montauban, France	Clay	(Australia) Grant Silcock	(Australia) Tim Crichton (Australia) Ashley Fisher	6–1, 6–4
2.	2001	Perth, Australia	Hard	(Australia) Stephen Huss	(Australia) Jordan Kerr (Australia) Grant Silcock	6–3, 4–6, 7–6^{(1)}
3.	2001	Tallahassee, United States	Hard	(Australia) Matthew Breen	(United States) Brandon Hawk (United States) Robert Kendrick	6–4, 6–2
4.	2001	Tampere, Finland	Clay	(Australia) Stephen Huss	(Finland) Tuomas Ketola (Finland) Jarkko Nieminen	7–5, 6–7^{(5)}, 6–4
