= 2002 US Open – Men's doubles =

Men's doubles
- 2002 US Open

Final
- Champion: (India) Mahesh Bhupathi (Belarus) Max Mirnyi
- Runner-up: (Czech Republic) Jiří Novák (Czech Republic) Radek Štěpánek
- Score: 6–3, 3–6, 6–4

Details
- Draw: 64
- Seeds: 16

Events
Singles	men	women		boys	girls
Doubles	men	women	mixed	boys	girls
WC Singles	men	women	quad
WC Doubles	men	women	quad
Legends	men	women	mixed
← 2001 ·	US Open	· 2003 →

Wayne Black and Kevin Ullyett were the defending champions, but lost in the quarterfinals to Mahesh Bhupati and Max Mirnyi.

Mahesh Bhupati and Max Mirnyi won the title, defeating Jiří Novák and Radek Štěpánek in the final, 6–3, 3–6, 6–4.

== Seeds ==
1. (The Bahamas) Mark Knowles / (Canada) Daniel Nestor (quarterfinals)
2. (United States) Donald Johnson / (United States) Jared Palmer (quarterfinals)
3. (India) Mahesh Bhupathi / (Belarus) Max Mirnyi (champions)
4. (Sweden) Jonas Björkman / (Australia) Todd Woodbridge (semifinals)
5. (Zimbabwe) Wayne Black / (Zimbabwe) Kevin Ullyett (quarterfinals)
6. (United States) Bob Bryan / (United States) Mike Bryan (semifinals)
7. (Czech Republic) Martin Damm / (Czech Republic) Cyril Suk (first round)
8. (Australia) Joshua Eagle / (Australia) Sandon Stolle (first round)
9. (Russia) Yevgeny Kafelnikov / (Netherlands) Paul Haarhuis (third round)
10. (South Africa) Ellis Ferreira / (Czech Republic) David Rikl (second round)
11. (Czech Republic) Jiří Novák / (Czech Republic) Radek Štěpánek (final)
12. (France) Julien Boutter / (Netherlands) Sjeng Schalken (second round)
13. (Australia) Michael Hill / (India) Leander Paes (second round)
14. (United States) Brian MacPhie / (Federal Republic of Yugoslavia) Nenad Zimonjić (third round)
15. (South Africa) Robbie Koenig / (Germany) David Prinosil (third round)
16. (South Africa) David Adams / (Argentina) Gastón Etlis (first round)

== Draw ==
=== Key ===
- Q = Qualifier
- WC = Wild card
- LL = Lucky loser
- Alt = Alternate
- ITF = ITF entry
- PR = Protected ranking
- SR = Special ranking
- SE = Special exempt
- JE = Junior exempt
- JR = Junior Accelerator Programme entrant
- CO = College Accelerator Programme entrant
- NG = Next Gen Accelerator Program entrant
- w/o = Walkover
- r = Retired
- d = Defaulted

=== Finals ===
Quarterfinals
1	(The Bahamas) Mark Knowles (Canada) Daniel Nestor	3	6^{5}
6	(United States) Bob Bryan (United States) Mike Bryan	6	7^{7}
3	(India) Mahesh Bhupathi (Belarus) Max Mirnyi	7^{7}	5	7^{7}
5	(Zimbabwe) Wayne Black (Zimbabwe) Kevin Ullyett	6^{4}	7	6^{3}
(United States) Devin Bowen (United States) Brandon Coupe	1	3
4	(Sweden) Jonas Björkman (Australia) Todd Woodbridge	6	6
11	(Czech Republic) Jiří Novák (Czech Republic) Radek Štěpánek	7	7
2	(United States) Donald Johnson (United States) Jared Palmer	5	5

Semifinals
6	(United States) Bob Bryan (United States) Mike Bryan	3	6	3
3	(India) Mahesh Bhupathi (Belarus) Max Mirnyi	6	3	6
4	(Sweden) Jonas Björkman (Australia) Todd Woodbridge	2	6^{4}
11	(Czech Republic) Jiří Novák (Czech Republic) Radek Štěpánek	6	7^{7}

Final
3	(India) Mahesh Bhupathi (Belarus) Max Mirnyi	6	3	6
11	(Czech Republic) Jiří Novák (Czech Republic) Radek Štěpánek	3	6	4

=== Top half ===
==== Section 1 ====
First round
1	(The Bahamas) M Knowles (Canada) D Nestor	6^{3}	6	6
(Spain) JI Carrasco (Spain) Á López Morón	7^{7}	2	0
(France) M Llodra (France) F Santoro	7^{7}	6
(Germany) K Braasch (Germany) R Schüttler	6^{2}	4
(Czech Republic) T Cibulec (Czech Republic) L Friedl	7^{12}	2	4
(United States) J Gimelstob (United States) J Tarango	6^{10}	6	6
(Argentina) M García (Argentina) M Rodríguez	6^{3}	4
14	(United States) B MacPhie (Federal Republic of Yugoslavia) N Zimonjić	7^{7}	6
9	(Netherlands) P Haarhuis (Russia) Y Kafelnikov	6	7^{7}
(South Africa) J Coetzee (South Africa) C Haggard	4	6^{2}
(Spain) A Portas (Argentina) A Schneiter	3	2
(Czech Republic) P Pála (Czech Republic) P Vízner	6	6
WC	(United States) P Amritraj (United States) S Amritraj	3	3
(Czech Republic) F Čermák (Czech Republic) O Fukárek	6	6
(North Macedonia) A Kitinov (Croatia) L Zovko	7^{7}	4	5
6	(United States) B Bryan (United States) M Bryan	6^{5}	6	7

Second round
1	(The Bahamas) M Knowles (Canada) D Nestor	7^{7}	6
(France) M Llodra (France) F Santoro	6^{5}	3
(United States) J Gimelstob (United States) J Tarango	7	2	6^{5}
14	(United States) B MacPhie (Federal Republic of Yugoslavia) N Zimonjić	5	6	7^{7}
9	(Netherlands) P Haarhuis (Russia) Y Kafelnikov	6	6
(Czech Republic) P Pála (Czech Republic) P Vízner	2	2
(Czech Republic) F Čermák (Czech Republic) O Fukárek	3	3
6	(United States) B Bryan (United States) M Bryan	6	6

Third round
1	(The Bahamas) M Knowles (Canada) D Nestor	6	6
14	(United States) B MacPhie (Federal Republic of Yugoslavia) N Zimonjić	3	4
9	(Netherlands) P Haarhuis (Russia) Y Kafelnikov	7	1	4
6	(United States) B Bryan (United States) M Bryan	5	6	6

Quarterfinals
1	(The Bahamas) M Knowles (Canada) D Nestor	3	6^{5}
6	(United States) B Bryan (United States) M Bryan	6	7^{7}

==== Section 2 ====
First round
3	(India) M Bhupathi (Belarus) M Mirnyi	6	6
(Austria) J Knowle (Germany) M Kohlmann	4	0
(Australia) A Florent (Federal Republic of Yugoslavia) D Vemić	1	4
(Australia) P Luczak (Australia) D Macpherson	6	6
(South Africa) P Rosner (United States) G Weiner	0^{r}
(South Africa) W Ferreira (United States) R Leach	3
(Australia) B Ellwood (Australia) P Hanley	6	7^{9}
16	(South Africa) D Adams (Argentina) G Etlis	3	6^{7}
12	(France) J Boutter (Netherlands) S Schalken	4	7^{8}	6
(Russia) D Golovanov (Australia) G Silcock	6	6^{6}	4
WC	(United States) J Brasington (United States) V Spadea	3	4
(Switzerland) G Bastl (Switzerland) R Federer	6	6
WC	(Israel) A Hadad (Pakistan) A-u-H Qureshi	6	6
(Argentina) M Hood (Argentina) S Prieto	4	2
(Australia) T Crichton (Australia) T Perry	1	3
5	(Zimbabwe) W Black (Zimbabwe) K Ullyett	6	6

Second round
3	(India) M Bhupathi (Belarus) M Mirnyi	6	7^{7}
(Australia) P Luczak (Australia) D Macpherson	1	6^{2}
(South Africa) W Ferreira (United States) R Leach	6	6
(Australia) B Ellwood (Australia) P Hanley	2	3
12	(France) J Boutter (Netherlands) S Schalken	3	4
(Switzerland) G Bastl (Switzerland) R Federer	6	6
WC	(Israel) A Hadad (Pakistan) A-u-H Qureshi	4	6	2
5	(Zimbabwe) W Black (Zimbabwe) K Ullyett	6	4	6

Third round
3	(India) M Bhupathi (Belarus) M Mirnyi	6	6
(South Africa) W Ferreira (United States) R Leach	3	2
(Switzerland) G Bastl (Switzerland) R Federer	5	6	4
5	(Zimbabwe) W Black (Zimbabwe) K Ullyett	7	4	6

Quarterfinals
3	(India) M Bhupathi (Belarus) M Mirnyi	7^{7}	5	7^{7}
5	(Zimbabwe) W Black (Zimbabwe) K Ullyett	6^{4}	7	6^{3}

=== Bottom half ===
==== Section 3 ====
First round
7	(Czech Republic) M Damm (Czech Republic) C Suk	2	5
(United States) M Fish (United States) J Morrison	6	7
(United States) D Bowen (United States) B Coupe	6	6
WC	(United States) R Ram (United States) J Stokke	4	2
(Sweden) J Landsberg (Belgium) T Vanhoudt	6	6^{3}	7
(Australia) S Huss (Australia) L Pearson	4	7^{7}	5
(Argentina) L Arnold Ker (Argentina) L Lobo	6^{7}	4
10	(South Africa) E Ferreira (Czech Republic) D Rikl	7^{9}	6
13	(Australia) M Hill (India) L Paes	6	4	6
(Italy) M Bertolini (Italy) C Brandi	4	6	3
WC	(United States) M Boeker (United States) R Ginepri	2	4
(Australia) W Arthurs (Australia) A Kratzmann	6	6
(Germany) N Kiefer (Romania) A Pavel	3	3
(United States) S Humphries (Czech Republic) P Luxa	6	6
(United States) J-M Gambill (United States) G Oliver	4	2
4	(Sweden) J Björkman (Australia) T Woodbridge	6	6

Second round
(United States) M Fish (United States) J Morrison	5	4
(United States) D Bowen (United States) B Coupe	7	6
(Sweden) J Landsberg (Belgium) T Vanhoudt	6	4	6
10	(South Africa) E Ferreira (Czech Republic) D Rikl	3	6	3
13	(Australia) M Hill (India) L Paes	6^{6}	6	6^{5}
(Australia) W Arthurs (Australia) A Kratzmann	7^{8}	4	7^{7}
(United States) S Humphries (Czech Republic) P Luxa	5	1
4	(Sweden) J Björkman (Australia) T Woodbridge	7	6

Third round
(United States) D Bowen (United States) B Coupe	6	6
(Sweden) J Landsberg (Belgium) T Vanhoudt	1	1
(Australia) W Arthurs (Australia) A Kratzmann	3	4
4	(Sweden) J Björkman (Australia) T Woodbridge	6	6

Quarterfinals
(United States) D Bowen (United States) B Coupe	1	3
4	(Sweden) J Björkman (Australia) T Woodbridge	6	6

==== Section 4 ====
First round
8	(Australia) J Eagle (Australia) S Stolle	4	6	4
(Australia) N Healey (Australia) J Kerr	6	4	6
(Brazil) D Melo (Brazil) A Simoni	4	2
(Czech Republic) J Levinský (Czech Republic) D Škoch	6	6
(Slovakia) D Hrbatý (Brazil) A Sá	3	7^{7}	3
WC	(United States) L Harper-Griffith (United States) E Taino	6	6^{4}	6
(Australia) A Fisher (The Bahamas) M Merklein	6^{4}	1
11	(Czech Republic) J Novák (Czech Republic) R Štěpánek	7^{7}	6
15	(South Africa) R Koenig (Germany) D Prinosil	6	6
(United States) J Blake (United States) T Blake	0	4
(France) A Clément (France) S Grosjean	6	6
(United States) A Kim (United States) K Kim	4	4
(Sweden) S Aspelin (Russia) A Olhovskiy	6	6
(South Africa) N Godwin (Japan) T Shimada	3	2
(South Africa) M Barnard (United States) J Thomas	6^{4}	6	2
2	(United States) D Johnson (United States) J Palmer	7^{7}	4	6

Second round
(Australia) N Healey (Australia) J Kerr	4	7	6
(Czech Republic) J Levinský (Czech Republic) D Škoch	6	5	2
WC	(United States) L Harper-Griffith (United States) E Taino	3	3
11	(Czech Republic) J Novák (Czech Republic) R Štěpánek	6	6
15	(South Africa) R Koenig (Germany) D Prinosil	6	6
(France) A Clément (France) S Grosjean	1	4
(Sweden) S Aspelin (Russia) A Olhovskiy	4	5
2	(United States) D Johnson (United States) J Palmer	6	7

Third round
(Australia) N Healey (Australia) J Kerr	2	2
11	(Czech Republic) J Novák (Czech Republic) R Štěpánek	6	6
15	(South Africa) R Koenig (Germany) D Prinosil	3	6	6^{2}
2	(United States) D Johnson (United States) J Palmer	6	3	7^{7}

Quarterfinals
11	(Czech Republic) J Novák (Czech Republic) R Štěpánek	7	7
2	(United States) D Johnson (United States) J Palmer	5	5
