= 2010 U.S. Men's Clay Court Championships – Singles =

Singles
- 2010 U.S. Men's Clay Court Championships

Final
- Champion: (Argentina) Juan Ignacio Chela
- Runner-up: (United States) Sam Querrey
- Score: 5–7, 6–4, 6–3

Details
- Draw: 28
- Seeds: 8

Events
Singles	Doubles
- U.S. Men's Clay Court Championships

Lleyton Hewitt was the defending champion, but he lost to Juan Ignacio Chela in the quarterfinals.
Chela won in the final 5–7, 6–4, 6–3 against Sam Querrey.

== Seeds ==
The top four seeds receive a bye into the second round.

1. (Chile) Fernando González (quarterfinals)
2. (United States) John Isner (second round)
3. (United States) Sam Querrey (final)
4. (Australia) Lleyton Hewitt (quarterfinals)
5. (Kazakhstan) Evgeny Korolev (first round)
6. (Argentina) Horacio Zeballos (semifinals)
7. (Argentina) Eduardo Schwank (second round)
8. (United States) Michael Russell (withdrew due to leg injury)

== Draw ==
Key

- Q = Qualifier
- WC = Wild card
- LL = Lucky loser
- Alt = Alternate
- ITF = ITF entry
- PR = Protected ranking
- SR = Special ranking
- SE = Special exempt
- JE = Junior exempt
- JR = Junior Accelerator Programme entrant
- CO = College Accelerator Programme entrant
- NG = Next Gen Accelerator Program entrant
- w/o = Walkover
- r = Retired
- d = Defaulted

=== Finals ===
Semifinals
6	(Argentina) Horacio Zeballos	5	2
(Argentina) Juan Ignacio Chela	7	6
3	(United States) Sam Querrey	7	1	7
(United States) Wayne Odesnik	6^{3}	6	5

Final
(Argentina) Juan Ignacio Chela	5	6	6
3	(United States) Sam Querrey	7	4	3

=== Top half ===
First round
Q	(South Africa) K Anderson	7	6
WC	(United States) D Young	5	3
(Israel) D Sela	6	7
(United States) J Levine	4	6^{6}
(United States) T Dent	3	r
6	(Argentina) H Zeballos	6
Q	(Republic of Ireland) C Niland	4	2
LL	(India) S Devvarman	6	6
(United States) R Ram	2	0	r
(Argentina) JI Chela	6	3
(Brazil) M Daniel	3	2
7	(Argentina) E Schwank	6	6

Second round
1	(Chile) F González	6	4	6
Q	(South Africa) K Anderson	4	6	4
(Israel) D Sela	3	2
6	(Argentina) H Zeballos	6	6
4/WC	(Australia) L Hewitt	1	6	7
LL	(India) S Devvarman	6	0	6^{2}
(Argentina) JI Chela	6	6^{5}	6
7	(Argentina) E Schwank	1	7	1

Quarterfinals
1	(Chile) F González	4	4
6	(Argentina) H Zeballos	6	6
4/WC	(Australia) L Hewitt	4	3
(Argentina) JI Chela	6	6

Semifinals
6	(Argentina) H Zeballos	5	2
(Argentina) JI Chela	7	6

=== Bottom half ===
First round
5	(Kazakhstan) E Korolev	3	6	2
Q	(United States) R Sweeting	6	4	6
(Chile) N Massú	6	6
(Germany) M Zverev	4	2
(Slovenia) B Kavčič	6	4	6
(Uzbekistan) D Istomin	3	6	3
LL	(United States) M Yani	1	5
(Kazakhstan) M Kukushkin	6	7
WC	(Poland) J Janowicz	3	4
(United States) W Odesnik	6	6
(Belgium) X Malisse	6	7
Q	(Australia) N Lindahl	3	5

Second round
Q	(United States) R Sweeting	7	6^{3}	4
(Chile) N Massú	6^{5}	7	6
(Slovenia) B Kavčič	2	1
3	(United States) S Querrey	6	6
(Kazakhstan) M Kukushkin	1	5
(United States) W Odesnik	6	7
(Belgium) X Malisse	7	6^{7}	7
2	(United States) J Isner	6^{3}	7	6^{3}

Quarterfinals
(Chile) N Massú	3	6	4
3	(United States) S Querrey	6	3	6
(United States) W Odesnik	6	6
(Belgium) X Malisse	4	1

Semifinals
3	(United States) S Querrey	7	1	7
(United States) W Odesnik	6^{3}	6	5

== Qualifying ==
=== Seeds ===
1. (South Africa) Kevin Anderson (qualified)
2. (India) Somdev Devvarman (qualifying competition, lucky loser)
3. (United States) Michael Yani (qualifying competition, lucky loser)
4. (Chile) Paul Capdeville (second round)
5. (United States) Ryan Sweeting (qualified)
6. (Argentina) Juan Pablo Brzezicki (first round)
7. (United States) Alex Kuznetsov (qualifying competition)
8. (Australia) Greg Jones (second round)

=== Qualifiers ===
1. (South Africa) Kevin Anderson
2. (Australia) Nick Lindahl
3. (United States) Ryan Sweeting
4. (Republic of Ireland) Conor Niland

=== Lucky losers ===
1. (India) Somdev Devvarman
2. (United States) Michael Yani

=== Draw ===
==== First qualifier ====
First round
(Venezuela) Daniel Vallverdú	w/o
(United States) John Valenti
(Barbados) Haydn Lewis	7^{11}	6^{12}	3
(South Africa) Fritz Wolmarans	6^{9}	7^{14}	6
(United States) Ryan Harrison	0	5
7	(United States) Alex Kuznetsov	6	7

Second round
1	(South Africa) Kevin Anderson	6	6
(United States) John Valenti	0	3
(South Africa) Fritz Wolmarans	4	2
7	(United States) Alex Kuznetsov	6	6

Qualifying competition
1	(South Africa) Kevin Anderson	5	6	6
7	(United States) Alex Kuznetsov	7	3	3

==== Second qualifier ====
First round
(Venezuela) José de Armas	6	6
(Venezuela) Piero Luisi	4	3
(Australia) Nick Lindahl	6	6
(United States) Tim Smyczek	2	1
(Germany) Frank Moser	6^{4}	1
8	(Australia) Greg Jones	7^{7}	6

Second round
2	(India) Somdev Devvarman	6	7
(Venezuela) José de Armas	1	5
(Australia) Nick Lindahl	6	6
8	(Australia) Greg Jones	0	4

Qualifying competition
2	(India) Somdev Devvarman	2	6^{3}
(Australia) Nick Lindahl	6	7^{7}

==== Third qualifier ====
First round
(Italy) Alessandro Motti	2	3
(Canada) Peter Polansky	6	6
(Serbia) Dušan Vemić	6	6^{7}	4
(United Kingdom) James Ward	3	7^{9}	6
(Mexico) Daniel Garza	4	5
5	(United States) Ryan Sweeting	6	7

Second round
3	(United States) Michael Yani	6	6
(Canada) Peter Polansky	2	4
(United Kingdom) James Ward	4	5
5	(United States) Ryan Sweeting	6	7

Qualifying competition
3	(United States) Michael Yani	1	6^{2}
5	(United States) Ryan Sweeting	6	7^{7}

==== Fourth qualifier ====
First round
(Republic of Ireland) Conor Niland	6	6
(Brazil) Tiago Fernandes	2	1
(New Zealand) Rubin Statham	7^{9}	4
(Slovenia) Luka Gregorc	6^{7}	3^{r}
(Russia) Alex Bogomolov Jr.	6	6
6	(Argentina) Juan Pablo Brzezicki	3	3

Second round
4	(Chile) Paul Capdeville	1	6	4
(Republic of Ireland) Conor Niland	6	1	6
(New Zealand) Rubin Statham	5	1
(Russia) Alex Bogomolov Jr.	7	6

Qualifying competition
(Republic of Ireland) Conor Niland	5	6	7
(Russia) Alex Bogomolov Jr.	7	3	5
