= 2011 French Open – Men's doubles =

Men's doubles
- 2011 French Open

Final
- Champions: (Belarus) Max Mirnyi (Canada) Daniel Nestor
- Runners-up: (Colombia) Juan Sebastián Cabal (Argentina) Eduardo Schwank
- Score: 7–6^{(7–3)}, 3–6, 6–4

Details
- Draw: 64
- Seeds: 16

Events
Singles	men	women		boys	girls
Doubles	men	women	mixed	boys	girls
WC Singles	men	women	quad
WC Doubles	men	women	quad
Legends	−45	45+	women
← 2010 ·	French Open	· 2012 →

Daniel Nestor and Nenad Zimonjić were the defending champions, but decided not to participate together. Nestor partnered Max Mirnyi, while Zimonjić teamed up with Michaël Llodra. Mirnyi and Nestor defeated Zimonjić and Llodra in the semifinals, 7–6^{(7–4)}, 7–6^{(7–5)}. In the final, they won against Juan Sebastián Cabal and Eduardo Schwank 7–6^{(7–3)}, 3–6, 6–4 for their first Grand Slam doubles title as a team.

== Seeds ==
1. (United States) Bob Bryan / (United States) Mike Bryan (semifinals)
2. (Belarus) Max Mirnyi / (Canada) Daniel Nestor (champions)
3. (India) Mahesh Bhupathi / (India) Leander Paes (second round)
4. (France) Michaël Llodra / (Serbia) Nenad Zimonjić (semifinals)
5. (India) Rohan Bopanna / (Pakistan) Aisam-ul-Haq Qureshi (quarterfinals)
6. (Poland) Mariusz Fyrstenberg / (Poland) Marcin Matkowski (first round)
7. (Poland) Łukasz Kubot / (Austria) Oliver Marach (first round)
8. (South Africa) Wesley Moodie / (Belgium) Dick Norman (first round)
9. (Sweden) Robert Lindstedt / (Romania) Horia Tecău (quarterfinals)
10. (United States) Eric Butorac / (Curaçao) Jean-Julien Rojer (first round)
11. (Brazil) Marcelo Melo / (Brazil) Bruno Soares (second round)
12. (The Bahamas) Mark Knowles / (Slovakia) Michal Mertiňák (first round)
13. (Spain) Marc López / (Spain) David Marrero (second round)
14. (Czech Republic) František Čermák / (Slovakia) Filip Polášek (third round)
15. (United States) John Isner / (United States) Sam Querrey (first round)
16. (Ukraine) Sergiy Stakhovsky / (Russia) Mikhail Youzhny (second round)

== Draw ==
=== Key ===
- Q = Qualifier
- WC = Wild card
- LL = Lucky loser
- Alt = Alternate
- ITF = ITF entry
- PR = Protected ranking
- SR = Special ranking
- SE = Special exempt
- JE = Junior exempt
- JR = Junior Accelerator Programme entrant
- CO = College Accelerator Programme entrant
- NG = Next Gen Accelerator Program entrant
- w/o = Walkover
- r = Retired
- d = Defaulted

=== Finals ===
Quarterfinals
1	(United States) Bob Bryan (United States) Mike Bryan	6^{2}	6	7^{7}
5	(India) Rohan Bopanna (Pakistan) Aisam-ul-Haq Qureshi	7^{7}	3	6^{3}
(Italy) Daniele Bracciali (Italy) Potito Starace	4	6	2
(Colombia) Juan Sebastián Cabal (Argentina) Eduardo Schwank	6	4	6
(United States) Scott Lipsky (United States) Rajeev Ram	6	3	1
4	(France) Michaël Llodra (Serbia) Nenad Zimonjić	2	6	6
9	(Sweden) Robert Lindstedt (Romania) Horia Tecău	4	2
2	(Belarus) Max Mirnyi (Canada) Daniel Nestor	6	6

Semifinals
1	(United States) Bob Bryan (United States) Mike Bryan	6^{4}	3
(Colombia) Juan Sebastián Cabal (Argentina) Eduardo Schwank	7^{7}	6
4	(France) Michaël Llodra (Serbia) Nenad Zimonjić	6^{4}	6^{5}
2	(Belarus) Max Mirnyi (Canada) Daniel Nestor	7^{7}	7^{7}

Final
(Colombia) Juan Sebastián Cabal (Argentina) Eduardo Schwank	6^{3}	6	4
2	(Belarus) Max Mirnyi (Canada) Daniel Nestor	7^{7}	3	6

=== Top half ===
==== Section 1 ====
First round
1	(United States) B Bryan (United States) M Bryan	6	5	6
(Colombia) S Giraldo (Spain) P Riba	3	7	1
(Australia) C Guccione (United Kingdom) J Murray	4	6	6
WC	(France) J Chardy (France) A Clément	6	3	2
(France) A Mannarino (France) B Paire	5	6	6^{3}
(Russia) T Gabashvili (Kazakhstan) M Kukushkin	7	4	7^{7}
(Netherlands) R Haase (Belgium) O Rochus	5	3
16	(Ukraine) S Stakhovsky (Russia) M Youzhny	7	6
11	(Brazil) M Melo (Brazil) B Soares	6	5	6
Alt	(United States) M Russell (United States) R Sweeting	2	7	2
(Kazakhstan) A Golubev (Uzbekistan) D Istomin	6	6
(Portugal) F Gil (Netherlands) R Wassen	3	4
(Uruguay) P Cuevas (Czech Republic) L Dlouhý	4	6	2
(Argentina) M González (Japan) K Nishikori	6	1	6
(Italy) A Seppi (Italy) S Vagnozzi	3	2
5	(India) R Bopanna (Pakistan) A-u-H Qureshi	6	6

Second round
1	(United States) B Bryan (United States) M Bryan	7^{7}	7
(Australia) C Guccione (United Kingdom) J Murray	6^{5}	5
(Russia) T Gabashvili (Kazakhstan) M Kukushkin	6	6
16	(Ukraine) S Stakhovsky (Russia) M Youzhny	4	4
11	(Brazil) M Melo (Brazil) B Soares	6	3	4
(Kazakhstan) A Golubev (Uzbekistan) D Istomin	3	6	6
(Argentina) M González (Japan) K Nishikori	7^{7}	3	4
5	(India) R Bopanna (Pakistan) A-u-H Qureshi	6^{4}	6	6

Third round
1	(United States) B Bryan (United States) M Bryan	7^{8}	7
(Russia) T Gabashvili (Kazakhstan) M Kukushkin	6^{6}	5
(Kazakhstan) A Golubev (Uzbekistan) D Istomin	3	5
5	(India) R Bopanna (Pakistan) A-u-H Qureshi	6	7

Quarterfinals
1	(United States) B Bryan (United States) M Bryan	6^{2}	6	7^{7}
5	(India) R Bopanna (Pakistan) A-u-H Qureshi	7^{7}	3	6^{3}

==== Section 2 ====
First round
3	(India) M Bhupathi (India) L Paes	2	6	6
(Germany) T Haas (Germany) P Petzschner	6	3	2
(Australia) A Fisher (Australia) S Huss	6	6
(Sweden) J Brunström (Finland) J Nieminen	2	3
WC	(France) P-H Herbert (France) N Renavand	3	7	4
(Croatia) I Dodig (Croatia) I Karlović	6	5	6
(Italy) D Bracciali (Italy) P Starace	2	7^{7}	7^{8}
15	(United States) J Isner (United States) S Querrey	6	6^{5}	6^{6}
10	(United States) E Butorac (Curaçao) J-J Rojer	6	3	3
(Sweden) S Aspelin (Australia) P Hanley	3	6	6
(India) S Devvarman (Chinese Taipei) Y-h Lu	3	4
(Spain) M Granollers (Spain) F López	6	6
(United Kingdom) C Fleming (Germany) P Marx	6	6
(United Kingdom) K Skupski (Slovakia) I Zelenay	4	4
(Colombia) JS Cabal (Argentina) E Schwank	7^{7}	6
8	(South Africa) W Moodie (Belgium) D Norman	6^{4}	3

Second round
3	(India) M Bhupathi (India) L Paes	6^{7}	4
(Australia) A Fisher (Australia) S Huss	7^{9}	6
(Croatia) I Dodig (Croatia) I Karlović	2	2
(Italy) D Bracciali (Italy) P Starace	6	6
(Sweden) S Aspelin (Australia) P Hanley	w/o
(Spain) M Granollers (Spain) F López
(United Kingdom) C Fleming (Germany) P Marx	6^{4}	3
(Colombia) JS Cabal (Argentina) E Schwank	7^{7}	6

Third round
(Australia) A Fisher (Australia) S Huss	4	2
(Italy) D Bracciali (Italy) P Starace	6	6
(Sweden) S Aspelin (Australia) P Hanley	4	7^{9}	3
(Colombia) JS Cabal (Argentina) E Schwank	6	6^{7}	6

Quarterfinals
(Italy) D Bracciali (Italy) P Starace	4	6	2
(Colombia) JS Cabal (Argentina) E Schwank	6	4	6

=== Bottom half ===
==== Section 3 ====
First round
7	(Poland) Ł Kubot (Austria) O Marach	4	6^{5}
(United States) S Lipsky (United States) R Ram	6	7^{7}
(Mexico) S González (United States) T Rettenmaier	6	1	6^{4}
(Germany) R Schüttler (Germany) A Waske	4	6	7^{7}
(Spain) G García López (Spain) A Montañés	2	1
(Germany) D Brown (Germany) M Kohlmann	6	6
(Ukraine) A Dolgopolov (Belgium) X Malisse	6	7^{7}
12	(The Bahamas) M Knowles (Slovakia) M Mertiňák	2	6^{3}
14	(Czech Republic) F Čermák (Slovakia) F Polášek	6	6
(Brazil) F Ferreiro (Brazil) A Sá	2	3
(Serbia) J Tipsarević (Serbia) V Troicki	7^{7}	6
WC	(France) M Gicquel (France) É Roger-Vasselin	6^{2}	2
WC	(France) O Patience (France) É Prodon	4	2
(Spain) P Andújar (Spain) D Gimeno-Traver	6	6
(Russia) I Kunitsyn (Croatia) I Ljubičić	5	4
4	(France) M Llodra (Serbia) N Zimonjić	7	6

Second round
(United States) S Lipsky (United States) R Ram	7^{7}	6
(Germany) R Schüttler (Germany) A Waske	6^{5}	3
(Germany) D Brown (Germany) M Kohlmann	3	6	7^{7}
(Ukraine) A Dolgopolov (Belgium) X Malisse	6	3	6^{5}
14	(Czech Republic) F Čermák (Slovakia) F Polášek	2
(Serbia) J Tipsarević (Serbia) V Troicki	1^{r}
(Spain) P Andújar (Spain) D Gimeno-Traver	3	4
4	(France) M Llodra (Serbia) N Zimonjić	6	6

Third round
(United States) S Lipsky (United States) R Ram	6	6
(Germany) D Brown (Germany) M Kohlmann	3	2
14	(Czech Republic) F Čermák (Slovakia) F Polášek	3	2
4	(France) M Llodra (Serbia) N Zimonjić	6	6

Quarterfinals
(United States) S Lipsky (United States) R Ram	6	3	1
4	(France) M Llodra (Serbia) N Zimonjić	2	6	6

==== Section 4 ====
First round
6	(Poland) M Fyrstenberg (Poland) M Matkowski	4	6	6^{3}
(France) J Benneteau (France) N Mahut	6	3	7^{7}
(Argentina) C Berlocq (Spain) R Ramírez Hidalgo	6	6
WC	(France) G Rufin (France) A Sidorenko	4	3
WC	(France) K de Schepper (France) A Olivetti	6	5	7^{7}
(Germany) M Berrer (Germany) F Mayer	3	7	6^{5}
(United States) J Cerretani (Canada) A Shamasdin	4	3
9	(Sweden) R Lindstedt (Romania) H Tecău	6	6
13	(Spain) M López (Spain) D Marrero	6	1
(Czech Republic) M Damm (Romania) V Hănescu	3	1^{r}
(Argentina) L Arnold Ker (Argentina) JI Chela	6	2	4
(Germany) C Kas (Austria) A Peya	4	6	6
(Italy) F Volandri (Italy) F Fognini	7^{7}	6
(Israel) J Erlich (Israel) A Ram	6^{5}	3
WC	(France) G Monfils (France) J Ouanna	6^{6}	3
2	(Belarus) M Mirnyi (Canada) D Nestor	7^{8}	6

Second round
(France) J Benneteau (France) N Mahut	6	6^{2}	7^{10}
(Argentina) C Berlocq (Spain) R Ramírez Hidalgo	3	7^{7}	6^{8}
WC	(France) K de Schepper (France) A Olivetti	7^{7}	4	3
9	(Sweden) R Lindstedt (Romania) H Tecău	6^{5}	6	6
13	(Spain) M López (Spain) D Marrero	4	6^{2}
(Germany) C Kas (Austria) A Peya	6	7^{7}
(Italy) F Volandri (Italy) F Fognini	3	3
2	(Belarus) M Mirnyi (Canada) D Nestor	6	6

Third round
(France) J Benneteau (France) N Mahut	2	4
9	(Sweden) R Lindstedt (Romania) H Tecău	6	6
(Germany) C Kas (Austria) A Peya	3	4
2	(Belarus) M Mirnyi (Canada) D Nestor	6	6

Quarterfinals
9	(Sweden) R Lindstedt (Romania) H Tecău	4	2
2	(Belarus) M Mirnyi (Canada) D Nestor	6	6
