= 2008 French Open – Men's doubles =

Men's doubles
- 2008 French Open

Final
- Champion: (Uruguay) Pablo Cuevas (Peru) Luis Horna
- Runner-up: (Canada) Daniel Nestor (Serbia) Nenad Zimonjić
- Score: 6–2, 6–3

Details
- Draw: 64
- Seeds: 16

Events
Singles	men	women		boys	girls
Doubles	men	women	mixed	boys	girls
WC Singles	men	women	quad
WC Doubles	men	women	quad
Legends	−45	45+	women
← 2007 ·	French Open	· 2009 →

Mark Knowles and Daniel Nestor were the defending champions, but did not compete together. Knowles partnered with Mahesh Bhupathi, but lost in the first round to Stephen Huss and Ross Hutchins. Nestor partnered with Nenad Zimonjić, and reached the final before losing to Pablo Cuevas and Luis Horna.

== Seeds ==
1. (United States) Bob Bryan / (United States) Mike Bryan (quarterfinals)
2. (Canada) Daniel Nestor / (Serbia) Nenad Zimonjić (final)
3. (Israel) Jonathan Erlich / (Israel) Andy Ram (third round)
4. (India) Mahesh Bhupathi / (The Bahamas) Mark Knowles (first round)
5. (Sweden) Simon Aspelin / (Austria) Julian Knowle (third round)
6. (Czech Republic) Martin Damm / (Czech Republic) Pavel Vízner (first round)
7. (France) Arnaud Clément / (France) Michaël Llodra (first round)
8. (Sweden) Jonas Björkman / (Zimbabwe) Kevin Ullyett (quarterfinals)
9. (Czech Republic) Lukáš Dlouhý / (India) Leander Paes (third round)
10. (South Africa) Jeff Coetzee / (South Africa) Wesley Moodie (second round)
11. (Poland) Mariusz Fyrstenberg / (Poland) Marcin Matkowski (second round)
12. (Belarus) Max Mirnyi / (United Kingdom) Jamie Murray (first round)
13. (Czech Republic) František Čermák / (Australia) Jordan Kerr (second round)
14. (Brazil) Marcelo Melo / (Brazil) André Sá (second round)
15. (Germany) Christopher Kas / (Netherlands) Rogier Wassen (second round)
16. (France) Julien Benneteau / (France) Nicolas Mahut (withdrew)

== Draw ==
=== Key ===
- Q = Qualifier
- WC = Wild card
- LL = Lucky loser
- Alt = Alternate
- ITF = ITF entry
- PR = Protected ranking
- SR = Special ranking
- SE = Special exempt
- JE = Junior exempt
- JR = Junior Accelerator Programme entrant
- CO = College Accelerator Programme entrant
- NG = Next Gen Accelerator Program entrant
- w/o = Walkover
- r = Retired
- d = Defaulted

=== Finals ===
Quarterfinals
1	(United States) Bob Bryan (United States) Mike Bryan	3	7	6^{1}
(Uruguay) Pablo Cuevas (Peru) Luis Horna	6	5	7
Alt	(Brazil) Bruno Soares (Serbia) Dušan Vemić	7	6
8	(Sweden) Jonas Björkman (Zimbabwe) Kevin Ullyett	5	3
(Serbia) Janko Tipsarević (Serbia) Viktor Troicki	3	4
(Russia) Igor Kunitsyn (Russia) Dmitry Tursunov	6	6
(Belgium) Steve Darcis (Belgium) Olivier Rochus	1	4
2	(Canada) Daniel Nestor (Serbia) Nenad Zimonjić	6	6

Semifinals
(Uruguay) Pablo Cuevas (Peru) Luis Horna	6	6^{7}	7
Alt	(Brazil) Bruno Soares (Serbia) Dušan Vemić	4	7	6^{6}
(Russia) Igor Kunitsyn (Russia) Dmitry Tursunov	6	4	4
2	(Canada) Daniel Nestor (Serbia) Nenad Zimonjić	4	6	6

Final
(Uruguay) Pablo Cuevas (Peru) Luis Horna	6	6
2	(Canada) Daniel Nestor (Serbia) Nenad Zimonjić	2	3

=== Top half ===
==== Section 1 ====
First round
1	(United States) B Bryan (United States) M Bryan	6	6
(India) R Bopanna (Pakistan) A-u-H Qureshi	1	4
(Australia) P Hanley (Australia) T Perry	7	6
WC	(France) T Ascione (France) F Serra	5	3
(United States) J Isner (United States) S Querrey	6	7
(Italy) P Starace (Italy) F Volandri	3	5
WC	(France) J Eysseric (France) A Mannarino	2	1
15	(Germany) C Kas (Netherlands) R Wassen	6	6
9	(Czech Republic) L Dlouhý (India) L Paes	6	6
(Thailand) S Ratiwatana (Thailand) S Ratiwatana	2	4
(Germany) T Behrend (Czech Republic) T Cibulec	2	1
(Argentina) J Acasuso (Argentina) S Prieto	6	6
(Czech Republic) I Minář (Czech Republic) J Vaněk	1	2
(Sweden) R Lindstedt (Finland) J Nieminen	6	6
(Uruguay) P Cuevas (Peru) L Horna	7	6
7	(France) A Clément (France) M Llodra	5	4

Second round
1	(United States) B Bryan (United States) M Bryan	6	6
(Australia) P Hanley (Australia) T Perry	2	3
(United States) J Isner (United States) S Querrey	6^{5}	7	3
15	(Germany) C Kas (Netherlands) R Wassen	7	5	0^{r}
9	(Czech Republic) L Dlouhý (India) L Paes	6	6
(Argentina) J Acasuso (Argentina) S Prieto	4	4
(Sweden) R Lindstedt (Finland) J Nieminen	4	1
(Uruguay) P Cuevas (Peru) L Horna	6	6

Third round
1	(United States) B Bryan (United States) M Bryan	7	6
(United States) J Isner (United States) S Querrey	6^{5}	2
9	(Czech Republic) L Dlouhý (India) L Paes	4	4
(Uruguay) P Cuevas (Peru) L Horna	6	6

Quarterfinals
1	(United States) B Bryan (United States) M Bryan	3	7	6^{1}
(Uruguay) P Cuevas (Peru) L Horna	6	5	7

==== Section 2 ====
First round
3	(Israel) J Erlich (Israel) A Ram	6	4	7
WC	(France) É Prodon (France) L Recouderc	3	6	5
(Slovakia) D Hrbatý (South Korea) H-t Lee	6	6
WC	(France) G Monfils (France) J Ouanna	3	4
(South Africa) C Haggard (Germany) M Zverev	6	6^{4}	3
Alt	(Brazil) B Soares (Serbia) D Vemić	4	7	6
WC	(France) S Grosjean (Brazil) G Kuerten	7	3	1
Alt	(Romania) F Mergea (Romania) H Tecău	5	6	6
11	(Poland) M Fyrstenberg (Poland) M Matkowski	6	7
(Czech Republic) J Levinský (Czech Republic) D Škoch	4	6^{3}
(United States) T Parrott (Slovakia) F Polášek	6	3	4
(Slovakia) M Mertiňák (Switzerland) J-C Scherrer	3	6	6
(Spain) Montañés (Argentina) S Roitman	6	4	6
(Israel) H Levy (Israel) D Sela	4	6	2
(United States) E Butorac (Australia) A Fisher	6^{8}	6	6^{2}
8	(Sweden) J Björkman (Zimbabwe) K Ullyett	7	1	7

Second round
3	(Israel) J Erlich (Israel) A Ram	4	6	6
(Slovakia) D Hrbatý (South Korea) H-t Lee	6	2	2
Alt	(Brazil) B Soares (Serbia) D Vemić	6	6
Alt	(Romania) F Mergea (Romania) H Tecău	3	4
11	(Poland) M Fyrstenberg (Poland) M Matkowski	4	6	4
(Slovakia) M Mertiňák (Switzerland) J-C Scherrer	6	3	6
(Spain) Montañés (Argentina) S Roitman
8	(Sweden) J Björkman (Zimbabwe) K Ullyett	w/o

Third round
3	(Israel) J Erlich (Israel) A Ram	4	4
Alt	(Brazil) B Soares (Serbia) D Vemić	6	6
(Slovakia) M Mertiňák (Switzerland) J-C Scherrer	2	6	3
8	(Sweden) J Björkman (Zimbabwe) K Ullyett	6	3	6

Quarterfinals
Alt	(Brazil) B Soares (Serbia) D Vemić	7	6
8	(Sweden) J Björkman (Zimbabwe) K Ullyett	5	3

=== Bottom half ===
==== Section 3 ====
First round
5	(Sweden) S Aspelin (Austria) J Knowle	7	6
(Sweden) J Brunström (Sweden) R Söderling	5	4
(Spain) M Granollers (Spain) S Ventura	6	7
(Australia) C Guccione (Australia) L Hewitt	4	5
(Serbia) J Tipsarević (Serbia) V Troicki	6	2	6
(Poland) L Kubot (Croatia) L Zovko	1	6	3
(Austria) J Melzer (Austria) A Peya	5	4
10	(South Africa) J Coetzee (South Africa) W Moodie	7	6
13	(Czech Republic) F Čermák (Australia) J Kerr	6	6
WC	(France) J Chardy (France) D Guez	1	3
(Russia) I Kunitsyn (Russia) D Tursunov	6	6
(Spain) N Almagro (Spain) Ó Hernández	3	3
(United States) S Lipsky (United States) D Martin	7	7
(Croatia) I Ljubičić (Czech Republic) P Pála	5	6^{3}
(Australia) S Huss (United Kingdom) R Hutchins	6	6
4	(India) M Bhupathi (The Bahamas) M Knowles	4	4

Second round
5	(Sweden) S Aspelin (Austria) J Knowle	5	6	6
(Spain) M Granollers (Spain) S Ventura	7	0	1
(Serbia) J Tipsarević (Serbia) V Troicki	6	6
10	(South Africa) J Coetzee (South Africa) W Moodie	2	4
13	(Czech Republic) F Čermák (Australia) J Kerr	3	2
(Russia) I Kunitsyn (Russia) D Tursunov	6	6
(United States) S Lipsky (United States) D Martin	5	7	3
(Australia) S Huss (United Kingdom) R Hutchins	7	6^{3}	6

Third round
5	(Sweden) S Aspelin (Austria) J Knowle	6^{3}	7	5
(Serbia) J Tipsarević (Serbia) V Troicki	7	6^{4}	7
(Russia) I Kunitsyn (Russia) D Tursunov	6	5	7
(Australia) S Huss (United Kingdom) R Hutchins	4	7	5

Quarterfinals
(Serbia) J Tipsarević (Serbia) V Troicki	3	4
(Russia) I Kunitsyn (Russia) D Tursunov	6	6

==== Section 4 ====
First round
6	(Czech Republic) M Damm (Czech Republic) P Vízner	5	4
(Argentina) L Arnold Ker (Argentina) JI Chela	7	6
(France) M Gicquel (France) F Santoro	6^{2}	6^{7}
WC	(France) N Devilder (France) O Patience	7	7
Alt	(Argentina) C Berlocq (Chile) P Capdeville	2	6^{5}
(Belgium) S Darcis (Belgium) O Rochus	6	7
(South Africa) R de Voest (Netherlands) R Haase	3	6	7
12	(Belarus) M Mirnyi (United Kingdom) J Murray	6	3	5
14	(Brazil) M Melo (Brazil) A Sá	4	6	6
(Italy) S Bolelli (Italy) A Seppi	6	3	2
(Argentina) A Calleri (Ecuador) N Lapentti	7	2	4
(United States) R Ram (United States) B Reynolds	6^{6}	6	6
(Switzerland) Y Allegro (Belgium) K Vliegen	6	1	4
(Brazil) M Daniel (United States) J Thomas	2	6	6
(France) É Roger-Vasselin (France) G Simon	3	3
2	(Canada) D Nestor (Serbia) N Zimonjić	6	6

Second round
(Argentina) L Arnold Ker (Argentina) JI Chela	6	7
WC	(France) N Devilder (France) O Patience	1	5
(Belgium) S Darcis (Belgium) O Rochus	6	3	6
(South Africa) R de Voest (Netherlands) R Haase	4	6	4
14	(Brazil) M Melo (Brazil) A Sá	4	4
(United States) R Ram (United States) B Reynolds	6	6
(Brazil) M Daniel (United States) J Thomas	3	5
2	(Canada) D Nestor (Serbia) N Zimonjić	6	7

Third round
(Argentina) L Arnold Ker (Argentina) JI Chela	2	4
(Belgium) S Darcis (Belgium) O Rochus	6	6
(United States) R Ram (United States) B Reynolds	3	2
2	(Canada) D Nestor (Serbia) N Zimonjić	6	6

Quarterfinals
(Belgium) S Darcis (Belgium) O Rochus	1	4
2	(Canada) D Nestor (Serbia) N Zimonjić	6	6
