= Stephen Huss (tennis) =

Australian tennis player

- Country (sports): Australia
- Residence: San Diego, California, USA
- Born: 10 December 1975 (age 50) Bendigo, Australia
- Height: 1.80 m (5 ft 11 in)
- Turned pro: 2000
- Retired: 2011
- Plays: Right-handed (unknown backhand)
- College: Auburn Tigers
- Prize money: $1,010,831

Singles
- Career record: 0–0
- Career titles: 0; 0 Challenger, 0 Futures
- Highest ranking: No. 807 (19 March 2001)

Doubles
- Career record: 126–171
- Career titles: 4; 18 Challenger, 8 Futures
- Highest ranking: No. 21 (26 June 2006)

Grand Slam doubles results
- Australian Open: 2R (2005, 2007, 2009)
- French Open: 3R (2008, 2010, 2011)
- Wimbledon: W (2005)
- US Open: 1R (2002, 2005, 2006, 2008, 2009, 2010, 2011)

Grand Slam mixed doubles results
- Australian Open: 2R (2007, 2009)
- French Open: 1R (2006, 2009)
- Wimbledon: SF (2009)
- US Open: 2R (2005, 2009)
- Last updated on: 10 December 2022.

Stephen Huss (/hʌs/; born 10 December 1975) is a former professional tennis player from Australia. Huss played tennis collegiately at Auburn University in the United States from 1996 to 2000, where he was an All-American in doubles in 1998 and in singles in 2000.

Huss played in the NCAA Tournament in both of those years for the Tigers. An All-SEC selection in 1998, he was the 1999 National Clay Court Champion along with partner Tiago Ruffoni. His 93 career doubles victories is an Auburn record.

Along with partner Wesley Moodie, he became the first qualifier to win the Wimbledon men's doubles championship in 2005, beating the 6th, 9th, 3rd, 1st & 2nd seeds in the process. His Wimbledon title was only his second doubles title on the ATP tour after his 2002 success at Casablanca with Myles Wakefield.

His Grand Slam success saw him soar from 101st to 32nd place in the ATP doubles rankings. He reached a career high 21st place in June 2006.

Huss retired from professional tennis after the 2011 US Open.

== Coaching ==
In June 2012, Huss accepted an assistant coaching position with Virginia Tech Men's Tennis under head coach Jim Thompson. Under Thompson, Huss and the Hokies experienced great success including a school high ranking of 14 and developing Joao Monteiro who reached top 250 in the world. He coached several junior and college tennis players.

He is currently a United States Tennis Association National team coach, working with up-and-coming female players. He has also coached top players Sofia Kenin, Jennifer Brady and Caroline Dolehide.

== Personal life ==
He currently resides in Atlanta, USA, with his wife, former professional tennis player Milagros Sequera, whom he married in Australia on 29 December 2009. They have two kids.

== Grand Slam finals ==
=== Doubles: 1 title ===
Result	Year	Championship	Surface	Partner	Opponents	Score
Win	2005	Wimbledon	Grass	(South Africa) Wesley Moodie	(United States) Bob Bryan (United States) Mike Bryan	7–6^{(7–4)}, 6–3, 6–7^{(2–7)}, 6–3

== ATP career finals ==
=== Doubles: 12 (4 titles, 8 runner-ups) ===
Legend (doubles) Grand Slam (1–0) ATP World Tour Finals (0–0) ATP Masters Series (0–1) ATP Championship Series (0–1) ATP World Series (3–6)	Finals by surface Hard (2–4) Clay (1–1) Grass (1–0) Carpet (0–3)	Finals by setting Outdoor (2–4) Indoor (2–4)

Result	W–L	Date	Tournament	Tier	Surface	Partner	Opponents	Score
Win	1–0	Apr 2002	Grand Prix Hassan II, Morocco	World Series	Clay	(South Africa) Myles Wakefield	(Argentina) Martín García (Argentina) Luis Lobo	6–4, 6–2
Win	2–0	Jul 2005	Wimbledon, London, United Kingdom	Grand Slam	Grass	(South Africa) Wesley Moodie	(United States) Bob Bryan (United States) Mike Bryan	7–6^{(7–4)}, 6–3, 6–7^{(2–7)}, 6–3
Loss	2–1	Oct 2005	Basel, Switzerland	World Series	Carpet	(South Africa) Wesley Moodie	(Argentina) Agustín Calleri (Chile) Fernando González	5–7, 5–7
Loss	2–2	Feb 2007	Delray Beach, United States	International Series	Hard	(United Kingdom) James Auckland	(United States) Hugo Armando (Belgium) Xavier Malisse	3–6, 7–6^{(7–4)}, [5–10]
Loss	2–3	Oct 2007	Tokyo, Japan	Championship Series	Hard	(Canada) Frank Dancevic	(Australia) Jordan Kerr (Sweden) Robert Lindstedt	4–6, 4–6
Win	3–3	Sep 2008	Beijing, China	International Series	Hard	(United Kingdom) Ross Hutchins	(Australia) Ashley Fisher (United States) Bobby Reynolds	7–5, 6–4
Loss	3–4	Oct 2008	Moscow, Russia	International Series	Carpet	(United Kingdom) Ross Hutchins	(Ukraine) Sergiy Stakhovsky (Italy) Potito Starace	6–7^{(4–7)}, 6–2, [6–10]
Loss	3–5	Oct 2008	Lyon, France	International Series	Carpet	(United Kingdom) Ross Hutchins	(France) Michaël Llodra (Israel) Andy Ram	3–6, 7–5, [8–10]
Loss	3–6	Mar 2009	Miami Open, United States	Masters Series	Hard	(Australia) Ashley Fisher	(Belarus) Max Mirnyi (Israel) Andy Ram	7–6^{(7–4)}, 2–6, [6–10]
Loss	3–7	Apr 2010	Houston, United States	250 Series	Clay	(South Africa) Wesley Moodie	(United States) Bob Bryan (United States) Mike Bryan	3–6, 5–7
Win	4–7	Oct 2010	Montpellier, France	250 Series	Hard	(United Kingdom) Ross Hutchins	(Spain) Marc López (Argentina) Eduardo Schwank	6–2, 4–6, [10–8]
Loss	4–8	Jan 2011	Auckland, New Zealand	250 Series	Hard	(Sweden) Johan Brunström	(Spain) Marcel Granollers (Spain) Tommy Robredo	4–6, 6–7^{(6–8)}

== ATP Challenger and ITF Futures finals ==
=== Doubles: 39 (26–13) ===
Legend ATP Challenger (18–9) ITF Futures (8–4)	Finals by surface Hard (14–4) Clay (11–6) Grass (0–3) Carpet (1–0)

Result	W–L	Date	Tournament	Tier	Surface	Partner	Opponents	Score
Win	1–0	Jul 1999	Germany F8, Zell	Futures	Clay	(Australia) Lee Pearson	(Belarus) Vitali Shvets (Switzerland) Sandro Della Piana	7–5, 6–1
Win	2–0	Aug 1999	Germany F9, Leun	Futures	Clay	(Australia) Lee Pearson	(Germany) Patrick Sommer (Germany) Erik Truempler	7–5, 6–1
Loss	2–1	Aug 1999	Belgium F1, Jupille-sur-Meuse	Futures	Clay	(Australia) Lee Pearson	(Sweden) Henrik Andersson (Sweden) Johan Settergren	4–6, 5–7
Win	3–1	Jun 2000	Greece F1, Chalcis	Futures	Hard	(Greece) Anastasios Vasiliadis	(Switzerland) Jean-Claude Scherrer (Israel) Kobi Ziv	6–2, 3–6, 6–3
Win	4–1	Jul 2000	Greece F3, Syros	Futures	Hard	(United Kingdom) James Smith	(United States) Dustin Mauck (United States) Keith Pollak	6–2, 6–4
Win	5–1	Jul 2000	Germany F8, Leun	Futures	Clay	(Australia) Lee Pearson	(France) Cedric Kauffmann (Germany) Alexander Waske	6–4, 6–4
Win	6–1	Jul 2000	Germany F9, Zell	Futures	Clay	(Australia) Lee Pearson	(Belgium) Wim Neefs (Netherlands) Djalmar Sistermans	6–4, 6–4
Win	7–1	Aug 2000	Germany F10, Berlin	Futures	Clay	(Australia) Lee Pearson	(Belgium) Wim Neefs (Netherlands) Djalmar Sistermans	6–3, 6–4
Loss	7–2	Nov 2000	Australia F2, Frankston	Futures	Hard	(Australia) Lee Pearson	(Australia) Paul Baccanello (Australia) Josh Tuckfield	6–7^{(4–7)}, 6–4, 1–6
Loss	7–3	Nov 2000	Australia F3, Berri	Futures	Grass	(Australia) Lee Pearson	(Australia) Paul Baccanello (Australia) Dejan Petrovic	3–6, 4–6
Loss	7–4	Dec 2000	Australia F4, Barmera	Futures	Grass	(Australia) Lee Pearson	(Australia) Tim Crichton (Australia) Todd Perry	6–4, 6–7^{(6–8)}, 6–7^{(11–13)}
Win	8–4	Mar 2001	Perth, Australia	Challenger	Hard	(Australia) Lee Pearson	(Australia) Jordan Kerr (Australia) Grant Silcock	6–3, 4–6, 7–6^{(7–1)}
Win	9–4	Jul 2001	Germany F7, Zell	Futures	Clay	(Australia) Lee Pearson	(Spain) Carlos Cuadrado (Spain) Gorka Fraile	6–3, 6–1
Win	10–4	Jul 2001	Tampere, Finland	Challenger	Clay	(Australia) Lee Pearson	(Finland) Tuomas Ketola (Finland) Jarkko Nieminen	7–5, 6–7^{(5–7)}, 6–4
Loss	10–5	Aug 2001	San Benedetto, Italy	Challenger	Clay	(Australia) Lee Pearson	(Italy) Leonardo Azzaro (Italy) Stefano Galvani	6–3, 6–7^{(7–9)}, 4–6
Loss	10–6	Aug 2001	Bressanone, Italy	Challenger	Clay	(Australia) Lee Pearson	(Italy) Massimo Bertolini (Italy) Cristian Brandi	5–7, 3–6
Loss	10–7	Sep 2001	Florianópolis, Brazil	Challenger	Clay	(Australia) Lee Pearson	(Argentina) Gastón Etlis (Argentina) Martín Rodríguez	2–6, 1–6
Win	11–7	Nov 2001	Tyler, United States	Challenger	Hard	(South Africa) Paul Rosner	(United States) Mardy Fish (United States) Jeff Morrison	6–4, 6–2
Win	12–7	Feb 2002	Brest, France	Challenger	Hard	(Australia) Ben Ellwood	(Israel) Jonathan Erlich (Israel) Andy Ram	6–1, 6–4
Win	13–7	Feb 2002	Wrocław, Poland	Challenger	Hard	(Australia) Ben Ellwood	(North Macedonia) Aleksandar Kitinov (Sweden) Johan Landsberg	6–7^{(3–7)}, 7–5, 7–6^{(8–6)}
Win	14–7	Nov 2002	Nottingham, United Kingdom	Challenger	Hard	(Australia) Ashley Fisher	(United States) Scott Humphries (The Bahamas) Mark Merklein	6–3, 7–6^{(7–5)}
Loss	14–8	Feb 2003	Andrézieux, France	Challenger	Hard	(United States) Jeff Tarango	(Croatia) Lovro Zovko (Czech Republic) David Škoch	6–7^{(4–7)}, 6–0, 3–6
Win	15–8	May 2003	Aix-en-Provence, France	Challenger	Clay	(South Africa) Myles Wakefield	(Australia) Todd Perry (Japan) Thomas Shimada	6–1, 7–5
Win	16–8	May 2003	Košice, Slovakia	Challenger	Clay	(South Africa) Myles Wakefield	(Spain) Álex López Morón (Argentina) Andrés Schneiter	6–4, 6–3
Loss	16–9	Aug 2003	Binghamton, United States	Challenger	Hard	(South Africa) Myles Wakefield	(Israel) Jonathan Erlich (Israel) Andy Ram	4–6, 3–6
Win	17–9	Nov 2003	Eckental, Germany	Challenger	Carpet	(Sweden) Robert Lindstedt	(Germany) Lars Burgsmüller (Germany) Andreas Tattermusch	walkover
Win	18–9	Jan 2004	Nouméa, New Caledonia	Challenger	Hard	(Australia) Ashley Fisher	(Australia) Luke Bourgeois (Australia) Vince Mellino	3–6, 6–4, 6–4
Loss	18–10	Apr 2004	Canberra, Australia	Challenger	Clay	(Australia) Peter Luczak	(Poland) Łukasz Kubot (Austria) Zbynek Mlynarik	6–7^{(3–7)}, 2–6
Loss	18–11	Apr 2004	Bermuda, Bermuda	Challenger	Clay	(Australia) Ashley Fisher	(Australia) Jordan Kerr (Belgium) Tom Vanhoudt	6–4, 3–6, 6–7^{(6–8)}
Win	19–11	Jan 2005	Nouméa, New Caledonia	Challenger	Hard	(South Africa) Wesley Moodie	(France) Jérôme Golmard (Israel) Harel Levy	6–3, 6–0
Win	20–11	May 2005	Budapest, Hungary	Challenger	Clay	(Sweden) Johan Landsberg	(Israel) Amir Hadad (Israel) Harel Levy	7–6^{(7–4)}, 6–1
Win	21–11	Oct 2005	Kolding, Denmark	Challenger	Hard	(Sweden) Johan Landsberg	(Denmark) Frederik Nielsen (Denmark) Rasmus Nørby	1–6, 7–6^{(7–4)}, [10–8]
Loss	21–12	Jun 2007	Surbiton, United Kingdom	Challenger	Grass	(United Kingdom) James Auckland	(United States) Alex Kuznetsov (Germany) Mischa Zverev	6–2, 3–6, [6–10]
Loss	21–13	Nov 2007	Nashville, United States	Challenger	Hard	(Australia) Ashley Fisher	(United States) Rajeev Ram (United States) Bobby Reynolds	7–6^{(7–4)}, 3–6, [10–12]
Win	22–13	Nov 2007	Kuala Lumpur, Malaysia	Challenger	Hard	(South Africa) Wesley Moodie	(India) Rohan Bopanna (Pakistan) Aisam Qureshi	7–6^{(12–10)}, 6–3
Win	23–13	Sep 2008	Tulsa, United States	Challenger	Hard	(Australia) Ashley Fisher	(United States) Rajeev Ram (United States) Bobby Reynolds	7–6^{(7–4)}, 6–3
Win	24–13	Apr 2010	Baton Rouge, United States	Challenger	Hard	(Australia) Joseph Sirianni	(Australia) Chris Guccione (Germany) Frank Moser	1–6, 6–2, [13–11]
Win	25–13	Apr 2010	Tallahassee, United States	Challenger	Hard	(Australia) Joseph Sirianni	(United States) Robert Kendrick (United States) Bobby Reynolds	6–2, 6–4
Win	26–13	May 2011	Sarasota, United States	Challenger	Clay	(Australia) Ashley Fisher	(United States) Alex Bogomolov Jr. (United States) Alex Kuznetsov	6–3, 6–4

== Performance timelines ==
Key
W	F	SF	QF	#R	RR	Q#	DNQ	A	NH

(W) winner; (F) finalist; (SF) semifinalist; (QF) quarterfinalist; (#R) rounds 4, 3, 2, 1; (RR) round-robin stage; (Q#) qualification round; (DNQ) did not qualify; (A) absent; (NH) not held; (SR) strike rate (events won / competed); (W–L) win–loss record.
To avoid confusion and double counting, these charts are updated at the conclusion of a tournament or when the player's participation has ended.

=== Doubles ===
Tournament	2001	2002	2003	2004	2005	2006	2007	2008	2009	2010	2011	SR	W–L	Win %
Grand Slam tournaments
Australian Open	1R	1R	1R	1R	2R	1R	2R	1R	2R	2R	1R	0 / 11	4–11	27%
French Open	A	2R	1R	1R	A	2R	1R	3R	1R	3R	3R	0 / 9	8–9	47%
Wimbledon	Q2	1R	1R	2R	W	3R	2R	2R	1R	1R	3R	1 / 10	13–9	47%
US Open	Q1	1R	A	A	1R	1R	A	1R	1R	1R	1R	0 / 7	0–7	0%
Win–loss	0–1	1–4	0–3	0–3	7–2	3–4	2–3	3–4	1–4	3–4	4–4	1 / 37	25–36	41%
ATP Tour Masters 1000
Indian Wells	A	A	A	A	A	2R	A	A	A	1R	A	0 / 2	1–2	33%
Miami Open	A	2R	A	A	A	1R	A	A	F	1R	A	0 / 4	5–4	56%
Monte Carlo	A	A	A	A	A	2R	A	A	A	A	A	0 / 1	0–1	0%
Rome	A	A	A	A	A	1R	A	A	1R	A	A	0 / 2	0–2	0%
Madrid	A	A	A	A	A	A	A	A	QF	A	A	0 / 1	2–1	67%
Canada Masters	A	A	A	A	1R	A	A	A	A	A	A	0 / 1	0–1	0%
Cincinnati	A	A	A	A	QF	A	A	A	1R	A	A	0 / 2	2–2	50%
Shanghai	Not Held								1R	A	A	0 / 1	0–1	0%
Win–loss	0–0	1–1	0–0	0–0	2–2	1–4	0–0	0–0	6–5	0–2	0–0	0 / 14	10–14	42%
Year End Ranking	126	72	113	107	22	55	70	56	45	60	0	Prize Money: $1,010,831		

=== Mixed doubles ===
Tournament	2002	2003	2004	2005	2006	2007	2008	2009	2010	2011	SR	W–L	Win %
Grand Slam tournaments
Australian Open	A	A	A	A	1R	2R	1R	2R	1R	A	0 / 5	2–5	29%
French Open	A	A	A	A	1R	A	A	1R	A	A	0 / 2	0–2	0%
Wimbledon	1R	3R	A	A	2R	A	A	SF	A	2R	0 / 5	7–5	58%
US Open	A	A	A	2R	A	A	A	2R	A	A	0 / 2	2–2	50%
Win–loss	0–1	2–1	0–0	1–1	1–3	1–1	0–1	5–4	0–1	1–1	0 / 14	14–14	50%
