= 2001 AIG Japan Open Tennis Championships – Women's singles =

Women's singles
- 2001 AIG Japan Open Tennis Championships

Final
- Champion: (United States) Monica Seles
- Runner-up: (Thailand) Tamarine Tanasugarn
- Score: 6–3, 6–2

Details
- Draw: 30 (4 Q / 2 WC )
- Seeds: 8

Events
Singles	men	women
Doubles	men	women
- Japan Open

Julie Halard-Decugis was the defending champion but did not compete this year, as she retired from professional tennis at the end of the 2000 season.

First-seeded Monica Seles won the title by defeating second-seeded Tamarine Tanasugarn 6–3, 6–2 in the final.

== Seeds ==
The top two seeds received a bye into the second round.

1. (United States) Monica Seles (champion)
2. (Thailand) Tamarine Tanasugarn (final)
3. (Japan) Ai Sugiyama (semifinals)
4. (United States) Meilen Tu (first round)
5. (Germany) Marlene Weingärtner (second round)
6. (Italy) Rita Grande (quarterfinals)
7. (France) Nathalie Dechy (second round)
8. (South Africa) Joannette Kruger (semifinals)

== Draw ==
Key

- Q = Qualifier
- WC = Wild card
- LL = Lucky loser
- Alt = Alternate
- ITF = ITF entry
- PR = Protected ranking
- SR = Special ranking
- SE = Special exempt
- JE = Junior exempt
- JR = Junior Accelerator Programme entrant
- CO = College Accelerator Programme entrant
- NG = Next Gen Accelerator Program entrant
- w/o = Walkover
- r = Retired
- d = Defaulted

=== Finals ===
Semifinals
1	(United States) Monica Seles	7	6
3	(Japan) Ai Sugiyama	5	4
8	(South Africa) Joannette Kruger	3	5
2	(Thailand) Tamarine Tanasugarn	6	7

Final
1	(United States) Monica Seles	6	6
2	(Thailand) Tamarine Tanasugarn	3	2

=== Top half ===
First round
(Australia) A Molik	4	7^{7}	5
Q	(South Korea) Y-j Cho	6	6^{3}	7
(Paraguay) R de los Ríos	3	2
(Austria) B Schwartz	6	6
(Slovenia) T Pisnik	7	6^{3}	4
6	(Italy) R Grande	5	7^{7}	6
3	(Japan) A Sugiyama	6	6
(Hungary) Z Gubacsi	4	1
(Slovakia) Ľ Cervanová	4	2
(Slovenia) K Srebotnik	6	6
Q	(South Korea) Y-j Choi	6	3	2
(New Zealand) P Nola	4	6	6
(Australia) R McQuillan	1	4
7	(France) N Dechy	6	6

Second round
1	(United States) M Seles	6	6
Q	(South Korea) Y-j Cho	2	3
(Austria) B Schwartz	4	4
6	(Italy) R Grande	6	6
3	(Japan) A Sugiyama	6	3	6
(Slovenia) K Srebotnik	2	6	1
(New Zealand) P Nola	6	4	7^{7}
7	(France) N Dechy	3	6	6^{5}

Quarterfinals
1	(United States) M Seles	6	6
6	(Italy) R Grande	1	2
3	(Japan) A Sugiyama	6	6
(New Zealand) P Nola	1	4

Semifinals
1	(United States) M Seles	7	6
3	(Japan) A Sugiyama	5	4

=== Bottom half ===
First round
8	(South Africa) J Kruger	7	7
(Chinese Taipei) J Lee	5	5
(Australia) N Pratt	6	6
WC	(Japan) R Fujiwara	2	4
(Japan) S Asagoe	6	6^{7}	4
(Indonesia) W Prakusya	3	7^{9}	6
(Switzerland) E Gagliardi	3	6	6
4	(United States) M Tu	6	2	1
5	(Germany) M Weingärtner	3	7	6
(Australia) E Dominikovic	6	5	3
Q	(France) A Fusai	3	2
WC	(Japan) S Obata	6	6
Q	(Japan) M Saeki	6	6^{3}	2
(United States) J Craybas	0	7^{7}	6

Second round
8	(South Africa) J Kruger	4	6	7^{7}
(Australia) N Pratt	6	3	6^{3}
(Indonesia) W Prakusya	3	6	5
(Switzerland) E Gagliardi	6	1	7
5	(Germany) M Weingärtner	1	7	3
WC	(Japan) S Obata	6	5	6
(United States) J Craybas	4	6	3
2	(Thailand) T Tanasugarn	6	4	6

Quarterfinals
8	(South Africa) J Kruger	0	6	6
(Switzerland) E Gagliardi	6	4	1
WC	(Japan) S Obata	0	2
2	(Thailand) T Tanasugarn	6	6

Semifinals
8	(South Africa) J Kruger	3	5
2	(Thailand) T Tanasugarn	6	7
