= 2011 Wimbledon Championships – Men's doubles =

Men's doubles
- 2011 Wimbledon Championships

Final
- Champions: (United States) Bob Bryan (United States) Mike Bryan
- Runners-up: (Sweden) Robert Lindstedt (Romania) Horia Tecău
- Score: 6–3, 6–4, 7–6^{(7–2)}

Details
- Draw: 64 (4 Q / 5 WC )
- Seeds: 16

Events
Singles	men	women		boys	girls
Doubles	men	women	mixed	boys	girls
WC Singles	men	women	quad
WC Doubles	men	women	quad
Legends	men	women	seniors
← 2010 ·	Wimbledon Championships	· 2012 →

Jürgen Melzer and Philipp Petzschner were the defending champions, but lost in the quarterfinals to Bob and Mike Bryan.

The Bryan brothers defeated Robert Lindstedt and Horia Tecău in the final, 6–3, 6–4, 7–6^{(7–2)}, to win the gentlemen's doubles title at the 2011 Wimbledon Championships.

The men's doubles event was originally scheduled to begin on 22 June, but due to bad weather it was delayed until the next day. To accommodate other rain delayed matches, the first round matches were played best of three sets, with best of five set scoring being resumed in the second round.

== Seeds ==
1. (United States) Bob Bryan / (United States) Mike Bryan (champions)
2. (Belarus) Max Mirnyi / (Canada) Daniel Nestor (second round)
3. (India) Mahesh Bhupathi / (India) Leander Paes (second round)
4. (India) Rohan Bopanna / (Pakistan) Aisam-ul-Haq Qureshi (first round)
5. (Austria) Jürgen Melzer / (Germany) Philipp Petzschner (quarterfinals)
6. (France) Michaël Llodra / (Serbia) Nenad Zimonjić (semifinals)
7. (Poland) Mariusz Fyrstenberg / (Poland) Marcin Matkowski (first round)
8. (Sweden) Robert Lindstedt / (Romania) Horia Tecău (final)
9. (United States) Eric Butorac / (Curaçao) Jean-Julien Rojer (second round)
10. (The Bahamas) Mark Knowles / (Poland) Łukasz Kubot (first round)
11. (South Africa) Wesley Moodie / (Belgium) Dick Norman (third round)
12. (Argentina) Juan Ignacio Chela / (Argentina) Eduardo Schwank (third round)
13. (Brazil) Marcelo Melo / (Brazil) Bruno Soares (second round)
14. (Spain) Marcel Granollers / (Spain) Tommy Robredo (third round)
15. (Spain) Marc López / (Spain) David Marrero (second round)
16. (Italy) Daniele Bracciali / (Czech Republic) František Čermák (second round)

Click on the seed number of a player to go to their draw section.

== Draw ==
=== Key ===
- Q = Qualifier
- WC = Wild card
- LL = Lucky loser
- Alt = Alternate
- ITF = ITF entry
- PR = Protected ranking
- SR = Special ranking
- SE = Special exempt
- JE = Junior exempt
- JR = Junior Accelerator Programme entrant
- CO = College Accelerator Programme entrant
- NG = Next Gen Accelerator Program entrant
- w/o = Walkover
- r = Retired
- d = Defaulted

=== Finals ===
Quarterfinals
1	(United States) Bob Bryan (United States) Mike Bryan	6	6	6
5	(Austria) Jürgen Melzer (Germany) Philipp Petzschner	3	4	4
(United States) James Cerretani (Germany) Philipp Marx	7^{7}	6^{7}	6^{5}	5
6	(France) Michaël Llodra (Serbia) Nenad Zimonjić	6^{3}	7^{9}	7^{7}	7
8	(Sweden) Robert Lindstedt (Romania) Horia Tecău	3	6	4	6	12
(France) Arnaud Clément (Czech Republic) Lukáš Dlouhý	6	1	6	4	10
WC	(United Kingdom) Colin Fleming (United Kingdom) Ross Hutchins	4	4	7^{7}	6	4
(Germany) Christopher Kas (Austria) Alexander Peya	6	6	6^{2}	2	6

Semifinals
1	(United States) Bob Bryan (United States) Mike Bryan	6	6	6^{8}	6^{4}	9
6	(France) Michaël Llodra (Serbia) Nenad Zimonjić	4	4	7^{10}	7^{7}	7
8	(Sweden) Robert Lindstedt (Romania) Horia Tecău	6	7^{7}	6
(Germany) Christopher Kas (Austria) Alexander Peya	3	6^{3}	2

Final
1	(United States) Bob Bryan (United States) Mike Bryan	6	6	7^{7}
8	(Sweden) Robert Lindstedt (Romania) Horia Tecău	3	4	6^{2}

=== Top half ===
==== Section 1 ====
First round
1	(United States) B Bryan (United States) M Bryan	6	6
(Argentina) M González (Italy) P Starace	3	3
(Israel) J Erlich (Israel) A Ram	6^{2}	4
(United States) A Bogomolov Jr. (Croatia) I Karlović	7^{7}	6
(Kazakhstan) A Golubev (Uzbekistan) D Istomin	4	1
(Sweden) S Aspelin (Australia) P Hanley	6	6
LL	(Italy) A Motti (France) S Robert	3	6^{7}
15	(Spain) M López (Spain) D Marrero	6	7^{9}
11	(South Africa) W Moodie (Belgium) D Norman	7	7^{7}
Q	(Philippines) T Huey (South Africa) I van der Merwe	5	6^{4}
(Argentina) C Berlocq (Brazil) R Mello	6^{5}	6	6
WC	(United Kingdom) J Delgado (United Kingdom) J Marray	7^{7}	3	8
(Sweden) J Brunström (Finland) J Nieminen	6	3	4
(United States) S Lipsky (United States) R Ram	4	6	6
Q	(United States) R Harrison (United States) T Rettenmaier	7^{7}	6^{1}	4
5	(Austria) J Melzer (Germany) P Petzschner	6^{4}	7^{7}	6

Second round
1	(United States) B Bryan (United States) M Bryan	7^{7}	6	7
(United States) A Bogomolov Jr. (Croatia) I Karlović	6^{4}	4	5
(Sweden) S Aspelin (Australia) P Hanley	6^{4}	7	7	6
15	(Spain) M López (Spain) D Marrero	7^{7}	5	5	3
11	(South Africa) W Moodie (Belgium) D Norman	4	7^{7}	7^{8}	6
WC	(United Kingdom) J Delgado (United Kingdom) J Marray	6	6^{5}	6^{6}	2
(United States) S Lipsky (United States) R Ram	4	6^{3}	6	3
5	(Austria) J Melzer (Germany) P Petzschner	6	7^{7}	4	6

Third round
1	(United States) B Bryan (United States) M Bryan	6	4	6^{5}	6	16
(Sweden) S Aspelin (Australia) P Hanley	3	6	7^{7}	3	14
11	(South Africa) W Moodie (Belgium) D Norman	6^{5}	3	6	2
5	(Austria) J Melzer (Germany) P Petzschner	7^{7}	6	4	6

Quarterfinals
1	(United States) B Bryan (United States) M Bryan	6	6	6
5	(Austria) J Melzer (Germany) P Petzschner	3	4	4

==== Section 2 ====
First round
4	(India) R Bopanna (Pakistan) A-u-H Qureshi	6	2	19
(Colombia) JS Cabal (Colombia) R Farah	2	6	21
(Kazakhstan) M Kukushkin (United States) M Russell	4	6	6
WC	(United Kingdom) D Cox (United Kingdom) J Ward	6	4	4
LL	(Thailand) Sa Ratiwatana (Thailand) So Ratiwatana	4	1
(United States) J Cerretani (Germany) P Marx	6	6
(Italy) A Seppi (Italy) S Vagnozzi	4	4
16	(Italy) D Bracciali (Czech Republic) F Čermák	6	6
10	(The Bahamas) M Knowles (Poland) Ł Kubot	6	6^{5}	4
(Australia) C Guccione (Canada) A Shamasdin	1	7^{7}	6
(Australia) C Ball (Mexico) S González	5	6	13
(Germany) D Brown (Germany) M Kohlmann	7	3	11
(Germany) R Schüttler (Germany) A Waske	7^{7}	3	2
(India) S Devvarman (Japan) K Nishikori	6^{3}	6	6
(Portugal) F Gil (Spain) R Ramírez Hidalgo	2	1
6	(France) M Llodra (Serbia) N Zimonjić	6	6

Second round
(Colombia) JS Cabal (Colombia) R Farah	6	6	6
(Kazakhstan) M Kukushkin (United States) M Russell	4	2	3
(United States) J Cerretani (Germany) P Marx	4	7	7^{7}	6
16	(Italy) D Bracciali (Czech Republic) F Čermák	6	5	6^{5}	4
(Australia) C Guccione (Canada) A Shamasdin	6^{4}	6^{6}	4
(Australia) C Ball (Mexico) S González	7^{7}	7^{8}	6
(India) S Devvarman (Japan) K Nishikori	3	4	6^{5}
6	(France) M Llodra (Serbia) N Zimonjić	6	6	7^{7}

Third round
(Colombia) JS Cabal (Colombia) R Farah	6	6^{2}	4	4
(United States) J Cerretani (Germany) P Marx	3	7^{7}	6	6
(Australia) C Ball (Mexico) S González	4	6^{9}	6^{4}
6	(France) M Llodra (Serbia) N Zimonjić	6	7^{11}	7^{7}

Quarterfinals
(United States) J Cerretani (Germany) P Marx	7^{7}	6^{7}	6^{5}	5
6	(France) M Llodra (Serbia) N Zimonjić	6^{3}	7^{9}	7^{7}	7

=== Bottom half ===
==== Section 3 ====
First round
8	(Sweden) R Lindstedt (Romania) H Tecău	6	7
WC	(United Kingdom) C Eaton (United Kingdom) J Goodall	2	5
(France) J Benneteau (France) N Mahut	7^{7}	6
LL	(Slovakia) L Lacko (Czech Republic) L Rosol	6^{5}	2
(Germany) M Bachinger (Germany) F Moser	7	6
WC	(Australia) L Hewitt (Australia) P Luczak	5	4
(Brazil) F Ferreiro (Brazil) A Sá	3	6^{5}
12	(Argentina) JI Chela (Argentina) E Schwank	6	7^{7}
14	(Spain) M Granollers (Spain) T Robredo	7^{7}	5	6
(Colombia) S Giraldo (Spain) P Riba	6^{3}	7	3
(United Kingdom) J Murray (Ukraine) S Stakhovsky	6	7
Q	(United Kingdom) D Rice (United Kingdom) S Thornley	3	5
(France) A Clément (Czech Republic) L Dlouhý	6	6
(Netherlands) R Haase (United Kingdom) K Skupski	4	2
(Croatia) I Dodig (Croatia) L Zovko	7^{9}	4	4
3	(India) M Bhupathi (India) L Paes	6^{7}	6	6

Second round
8	(Sweden) R Lindstedt (Romania) H Tecău	6	6	5	7^{7}
(France) J Benneteau (France) N Mahut	4	4	7	6^{4}
(Germany) M Bachinger (Germany) F Moser	2	6^{4}	7^{7}	7^{8}	3
12	(Argentina) JI Chela (Argentina) E Schwank	6	7^{7}	6^{5}	6^{6}	6
14	(Spain) M Granollers (Spain) T Robredo	7	7^{7}	6
(United Kingdom) J Murray (Ukraine) S Stakhovsky	5	6^{3}	1
(France) A Clément (Czech Republic) L Dlouhý	2	6	7^{7}	6
3	(India) M Bhupathi (India) L Paes	6	3	6^{1}	4

Third round
8	(Sweden) R Lindstedt (Romania) H Tecău	7^{8}	7^{7}	7^{10}
12	(Argentina) JI Chela (Argentina) E Schwank	6^{6}	6^{2}	6^{8}
14	(Spain) M Granollers (Spain) T Robredo	3	5	5
(France) A Clément (Czech Republic) L Dlouhý	6	7	7

Quarterfinals
8	(Sweden) R Lindstedt (Romania) H Tecău	3	6	4	6	12
(France) A Clément (Czech Republic) L Dlouhý	6	1	6	4	10

==== Section 4 ====
First round
7	(Poland) M Fyrstenberg (Poland) M Matkowski	2	1
WC	(United Kingdom) C Fleming (United Kingdom) R Hutchins	6	6
LL	(Italy) F Cipolla (Italy) P Lorenzi	3	4
(Bulgaria) G Dimitrov (Russia) D Tursunov	6	6
(Australia) A Fisher (Australia) S Huss	6^{1}	7	9
(Czech Republic) M Damm (Netherlands) R Wassen	7^{7}	5	7
(Slovakia) F Polášek (Slovakia) I Zelenay	4	6	4
9	(United States) E Butorac (Curaçao) J-J Rojer	6	4	6
13	(Brazil) M Melo (Brazil) B Soares	7^{7}	6
(Spain) G García López (Spain) A Montañés	6^{3}	1
(Germany) C Kas (Austria) A Peya	6	6
(Spain) P Andújar (Spain) D Gimeno Traver	2	3
(South Africa) K Anderson (Austria) J Knowle	7	6
Q	(Slovakia) K Beck (Czech Republic) D Škoch	5	1
LL	(Czech Republic) L Friedl (United States) D Martin	4	4
2	(Belarus) M Mirnyi (Canada) D Nestor	6	6

Second round
WC	(United Kingdom) C Fleming (United Kingdom) R Hutchins	4	6	6^{5}	6	6
(Bulgaria) G Dimitrov (Russia) D Tursunov	6	2	7^{7}	2	4
(Australia) A Fisher (Australia) S Huss	6	6	6
9	(United States) E Butorac (Curaçao) J-J Rojer	4	3	3
13	(Brazil) M Melo (Brazil) B Soares	7^{7}	1	4	2
(Germany) C Kas (Austria) A Peya	6^{2}	6	6	6
(South Africa) K Anderson (Austria) J Knowle	7^{7}	7^{9}	6
2	(Belarus) M Mirnyi (Canada) D Nestor	6^{2}	6^{7}	3

Third round
WC	(United Kingdom) C Fleming (United Kingdom) R Hutchins	6	6	6
(Australia) A Fisher (Australia) S Huss	3	4	2
(Germany) C Kas (Austria) A Peya	7^{7}	6^{1}	6	5	8
(South Africa) K Anderson (Austria) J Knowle	6^{5}	7^{7}	4	7	6

Quarterfinals
WC	(United Kingdom) C Fleming (United Kingdom) R Hutchins	4	4	7^{7}	6	4
(Germany) C Kas (Austria) A Peya	6	6	6^{2}	2	6
