= 2010 U.S. Men's Clay Court Championships – Doubles =

Doubles
- 2010 U.S. Men's Clay Court Championships

Final
- Champions: (United States) Bob Bryan (United States) Mike Bryan
- Runners-up: (Australia) Stephen Huss (South Africa) Wesley Moodie
- Score: 6–3, 7–5

Details
- Draw: 16
- Seeds: 4

Events
Singles	Doubles
- U.S. Men's Clay Court Championships

Defending champions Bob Bryan and Mike Bryan defeated Stephen Huss and Wesley Moodie in the final, 6–3, 7–5 to win the doubles tennis title at the 2010 U.S. Men's Clay Court Championships.

== Seeds ==
1. (United States) Bob Bryan / (United States) Mike Bryan (champions)
2. (United States) Mardy Fish / (The Bahamas) Mark Knowles (second round, withdrew)
3. (Australia) Stephen Huss / (South Africa) Wesley Moodie (final)
4. (Sweden) Johan Brunström / (Netherlands Antilles) Jean-Julien Rojer (first round)

== Draw ==
Key

- Q = Qualifier
- WC = Wild card
- LL = Lucky loser
- Alt = Alternate
- ITF = ITF entry
- PR = Protected ranking
- SR = Special ranking
- SE = Special exempt
- JE = Junior exempt
- JR = Junior Accelerator Programme entrant
- CO = College Accelerator Programme entrant
- NG = Next Gen Accelerator Program entrant
- w/o = Walkover
- r = Retired
- d = Defaulted

=== Draw ===
First round
1	(United States) B Bryan (United States) M Bryan	6	7
(United Kingdom) R Hutchins (Australia) J Kerr	4	6^{4}
(Czech Republic) M Damm (Slovakia) F Polášek	4	6	[11]
(Kazakhstan) E Korolev (Germany) F Moser	6	3	[9]
4	(Sweden) J Brunström (Netherlands Antilles) J-J Rojer	7	2	[5]
(Uzbekistan) D Istomin (Italy) A Motti	5	6	[10]
WC	(Australia) N Healey (Australia) L Hewitt	7	7
(United States) J Cerretani (Canada) A Shamasdin	6^{3}	5
(Belgium) X Malisse (United States) M Russell	6	6^{6}	[1]
WC	(United States) R Harrison (United States) D Young	2	7	[10]
(Brazil) A Sá (Croatia) D Vemić	3	6^{6}
3	(Australia) S Huss (South Africa) W Moodie	6	7
(Argentina) H Zeballos (Germany) M Zverev	7	6
(United States) S Lipsky (United States) T Rettenmaier	5	4
(United States) E Butorac (United States) R Ram	7	5	[9]
2	(United States) M Fish (The Bahamas) M Knowles	6^{3}	7	[11]

Quarterfinals
1	(United States) B Bryan (United States) M Bryan	6	6
(Czech Republic) M Damm (Slovakia) F Polášek	4	3
(Uzbekistan) D Istomin (Italy) A Motti	4	6^{5}
WC	(Australia) N Healey (Australia) L Hewitt	6	7
WC	(United States) R Harrison (United States) D Young	3	7	[8]
3	(Australia) S Huss (South Africa) W Moodie	6	6^{4}	[10]
(Argentina) H Zeballos (Germany) M Zverev	w/o
2	(United States) M Fish (The Bahamas) M Knowles

Semifinals
1	(United States) B Bryan (United States) M Bryan	6	7
WC	(Australia) N Healey (Australia) L Hewitt	2	6^{4}
3	(Australia) S Huss (South Africa) W Moodie	6	6
(Argentina) H Zeballos (Germany) M Zverev	3	3

Finals
1	(United States) B Bryan (United States) M Bryan	6	7
3	(Australia) S Huss (South Africa) W Moodie	3	5
