= 2001 AIG Japan Open Tennis Championships – Men's singles =

Men's singles
- 2001 AIG Japan Open Tennis Championships

Final
- Champion: (Australia) Lleyton Hewitt
- Runner-up: (Switzerland) Michel Kratochvil
- Score: 6–4, 6–2

Details
- Draw: 56 (7 Q / 5 WC )
- Seeds: 16

Events
Singles	men	women
Doubles	men	women
- Japan Open

Sjeng Schalken was the defending champion but lost in the quarterfinals to Michel Kratochvil.

Lleyton Hewitt won in the final 6–4, 6–2 against Kratochvil. With the victory, he became the last male player to win his debut event as a Grand Slam champion (having recently won the US Open) until Jannik Sinner in 2024.

== Seeds ==
The top eight seeds received a bye to the second round.

1. (Australia) Lleyton Hewitt (champion)
2. (Netherlands) Sjeng Schalken (quarterfinals)
3. (Germany) Rainer Schüttler (third round)
4. (Sweden) Jonas Björkman (third round)
5. (Switzerland) Michel Kratochvil (final)
6. (United States) Michael Chang (third round)
7. (Chile) Marcelo Ríos (quarterfinals)
8. (Spain) Francisco Clavet (quarterfinals)
9. (Germany) Lars Burgsmüller (third round)
10. (Israel) Harel Levy (second round)
11. (Chile) Nicolás Massú (third round)
12. (Australia) Andrew Ilie (first round)
13. (Spain) Álex Calatrava (first round)
14. (Australia) Wayne Arthurs (second round)
15. (United States) Michael Russell (third round)
16. (Paraguay) Ramón Delgado (second round)

== Draw ==
Key

- Q = Qualifier
- WC = Wild card
- LL = Lucky loser
- Alt = Alternate
- ITF = ITF entry
- PR = Protected ranking
- SR = Special ranking
- SE = Special exempt
- JE = Junior exempt
- JR = Junior Accelerator Programme entrant
- CO = College Accelerator Programme entrant
- NG = Next Gen Accelerator Program entrant
- w/o = Walkover
- r = Retired
- d = Defaulted

=== Finals ===
Semifinals
1	(Australia) Lleyton Hewitt	6	6
(United States) James Blake	4	0
(Slovakia) Karol Kučera	0	3
5	(Switzerland) Michel Kratochvil	6	6

Final
1	(Australia) Lleyton Hewitt	6	6
5	(Switzerland) Michel Kratochvil	4	2

=== Top half ===
==== Section 1 ====
First round
(United Kingdom) J Delgado	4	4
(Germany) M-K Goellner	6	6
Q	(United States) J Thomas	3	2
(United States) C Mamiit	6	6
(South Africa) N Godwin	4	6^{1}
15	(United States) M Russell	6	7^{7}
11	(Chile) N Massú	6	6
(Netherlands) E Kempes	4	4
(South Korea) Y-I Yoon	3	1
(Czech Republic) T Zíb	6	6
(France) N Thomann	3	1
(Germany) T Behrend	6	6

Second round
1	(Australia) L Hewitt	6	6
(Germany) M-K Goellner	2	2
(United States) C Mamiit	6	4	3
15	(United States) M Russell	3	6	6
11	(Chile) N Massú	6	7^{7}
(Czech Republic) T Zíb	3	6^{4}
(Germany) T Behrend	6^{7}	2
8	(Spain) F Clavet	7^{9}	6

Third round
1	(Australia) L Hewitt	6	6
15	(United States) M Russell	1	1
11	(Chile) N Massú	3	4
8	(Spain) F Clavet	6	6

Quarterfinals
1	(Australia) L Hewitt	4	6	6
8	(Spain) F Clavet	6	4	2

==== Section 2 ====
First round
Q	(Japan) M Onoda	4	4
WC	(Japan) H Kondo	6	6
(United States) J Blake	6	6
WC	(Japan) Y Ishii	3	4
Q	(Czech Republic) R Žitko	2	7^{7}	1
14	(Australia) W Arthurs	6	6^{3}	6
10	(Israel) H Levy	6	6
Q	(Japan) S Iwabuchi	3	3
Q	(Thailand) D Udomchoke	6	4	6
(United Kingdom) B Cowan	2	6	3
(Zimbabwe) B Black	6	6
(United States) E Taino	4	1

Second round
4	(Sweden) J Björkman	6	6
WC	(Japan) H Kondo	1	3
(United States) J Blake	7^{7}	7
14	(Australia) W Arthurs	6^{4}	5
10	(Israel) H Levy	5	0
Q	(Thailand) D Udomchoke	7	6
(Zimbabwe) B Black	2	5
7	(Chile) M Ríos	6	7

Third round
4	(Sweden) J Björkman	1	5
(United States) J Blake	6	7
Q	(Thailand) D Udomchoke	3	2
7	(Chile) M Ríos	6	6

Quarterfinals
(United States) J Blake	4	6	6
7	(Chile) M Ríos	6	4	1

=== Bottom half ===
==== Section 3 ====
First round
(Germany) A Pretzsch	6^{3}	7^{7}	6
(Thailand) P Srichaphan	7^{7}	6^{5}	1
(Armenia) S Sargsian	6	6
(Brazil) A Sá	2	3
WC	(Japan) T Suzuki	5	6	6
12	(Australia) A Ilie	7	2	4
16	(Paraguay) R Delgado	6	6
WC	(Japan) G Motomura	4	4
(Slovakia) K Kučera	6	4	6
(Brazil) A Simoni	3	6	1
(United Kingdom) M Lee	4	2
(Sweden) M Larsson	6	6

Second round
6	(United States) M Chang	6	6
(Germany) A Pretzsch	3	4
(Armenia) S Sargsian	5	6	4
WC	(Japan) T Suzuki	7	4	6
16	(Paraguay) R Delgado	4	4
(Slovakia) K Kučera	6	6
(Sweden) M Larsson	3	5
3	(Germany) R Schüttler	6	7

Third round
6	(United States) M Chang	6^{3}	2
WC	(Japan) T Suzuki	7^{7}	6
(Slovakia) K Kučera	6	6
3	(Germany) R Schüttler	2	2

Quarterfinals
WC	(Japan) T Suzuki	3	3
(Slovakia) K Kučera	6	6

==== Section 4 ====
First round
(Czech Republic) O Fukárek	6	7^{7}
Q	(Czech Republic) D Vacek	2	6^{3}
(South Korea) H-T Lee	7^{13}	6
(Germany) M Hantschk	6^{11}	4
(France) M Llodra	6^{3}	6	2
9	(Germany) L Burgsmüller	7^{7}	2	6
13	(Spain) Á Calatrava	3	1
(Switzerland) I Heuberger	6	6
Q	(Israel) N Behr	6	6
WC	(Japan) T Terachi	2	1
(Georgia (country)) I Labadze	7^{7}	3	5
(Germany) C Vinck	6^{3}	6	7

Second round
5	(Switzerland) M Kratochvil	7^{7}	1	6
(Czech Republic) O Fukárek	6^{3}	6	4
(South Korea) H-T Lee	6	3	5
9	(Germany) L Burgsmüller	3	6	7
(Switzerland) I Heuberger	3	6	6
Q	(Israel) N Behr	6	4	4
(Germany) C Vinck	3	4
2	(Netherlands) S Schalken	6	6

Third round
5	(Switzerland) M Kratochvil	6	6
9	(Germany) L Burgsmüller	3	2
(Switzerland) I Heuberger	2	2
2	(Netherlands) S Schalken	6	6

Quarterfinals
5	(Switzerland) M Kratochvil	6	6
2	(Netherlands) S Schalken	3	4
