= Grant Silcock =

Australian tennis player

- Country (sports): Australia
- Residence: Brisbane
- Born: 21 May 1975 (age 50)
- Plays: Right-handed
- Prize money: $142,184

Singles
- Career record: 0–0
- Career titles: 0
- Highest ranking: No. 536 (7 July 1997)

Grand Slam singles results
- Australian Open: Q1 (1997, 1998)

Doubles
- Career record: 13–40
- Career titles: 1
- Highest ranking: No. 89 (8 July 2002)

Grand Slam doubles results
- Australian Open: 2R (1999, 2000, 2001, 2002)
- French Open: 2R (2002)
- Wimbledon: 1R (1999, 2001, 2002)
- US Open: 1R (1998, 2002)

Grant Silcock (born 21 May 1975) is a former professional tennis player from Australia. Silcock is currently Anglican Church Grammar School head tennis coach.

== Career ==
Silcock was a doubles specialist and won the Hong Kong Open in 1999, partnering James Greenhalgh. The pair upset future Grand Slam winners Mark Knowles and Daniel Nestor in the semi-finals. They won the final in a walkover, as one of their opponents, Andre Agassi, withdrew with a shoulder injury.

His next best result on the ATP Tour was reaching the semi-finals of the Campionati Internazionali di Sicilia in 2001, with Jordan Kerr.

He made the second round of a Grand Slam on five occasions, once with Paul Kilderry as his partner, once with Dejan Petrovic and three times with Kerr. It was the furthest he would reach in a Grand Slam tournament, although he came close to a third round appearance in the 2002 French Open when he and Kerr lost a second set tiebreak which would have given them a win over Knowles/Nestor.

The Australian made the occasional singles appearances on the Challenger and Futures circuit and reached a ranking of 536 in the world.

== ATP career finals ==
=== Doubles: 1 (1–0) ===
Result	W–L	Date	Tournament	Surface	Partner	Opponents	Score
Win	1–0	Apr 1999	Hong Kong	Hard	(New Zealand) James Greenhalgh	(United States) Andre Agassi (United States) David Wheaton	W/O

== Challenger titles ==
=== Doubles: (9) ===
No.	Year	Tournament	Surface	Partner	Opponents	Score
1.	1997	Alpirsbach, Germany	Clay	(Germany) Mathias Huning	(Spain) Álex López Morón (Italy) Fabio Maggi	5–7, 6–4, 7–5
2.	1998	Winnetka, United States	Hard	(South Africa) Myles Wakefield	(United States) Geoff Grant (The Bahamas) Mark Merklein	1–6, 7–6, 7–6
3.	1999	Dallas, United States	Hard	(Australia) Paul Kilderry	(United States) Mitch Sprengelmeyer (South Africa) Jason Weir-Smith	4–6, 6–3, 6–1
4.	1999	Perth, Australia	Hard	(Australia) Paul Kilderry	(Australia) Paul Baccanello (Australia) Josh Tuckfield	6–4, 7–6^{(7–5)}
5.	2000	Montauban, France	Clay	(Australia) Lee Pearson	(Australia) Tim Crichton (Australia) Ashley Fisher	6–1, 6–4
6.	2001	Scheveningen, Netherlands	Clay	(Australia) Jordan Kerr	(United States) Brandon Coupe (Australia) Tim Crichton	6–3, 6–4
7.	2001	Cordoba, Spain	Hard	(Australia) Jordan Kerr	(Spain) Emilio Benfele Álvarez (France) Michaël Llodra	6–3, 5–7, 6–3
8.	2001	Kyiv, Ukraine	Clay	(Australia) Jordan Kerr	(Russia) Kirill Ivanov-Smolensky (Russia) Vadim Kutsenko	6–1, 7–6^{(7–3)}
9.	2002	Bangkok, Thailand	Hard	(Australia) Anthony Ross	(Argentina) Federico Browne (Netherlands) Rogier Wassen	W/O
