= 2001 AIG Japan Open Tennis Championships – Women's doubles =

Women's doubles
- 2001 AIG Japan Open Tennis Championships

Final
- Champions: (South Africa) Liezel Huber (Australia) Rachel McQuillan
- Runners-up: (Chinese Taipei) Janet Lee (Indonesia) Wynne Prakusya
- Score: 6–2, 6–0

Details
- Draw: 16 (1Q / 1WC)
- Seeds: 4

Events
Singles	men	women
Doubles	men	women
- Japan Open

Julie Halard-Decugis and Corina Morariu were the defending champions, but none competed this year. Halard-Decugis retired from professional tennis at the end of the 2000 season, while Morariu was forced to leave the Tour after being diagnosed with leukemia.

Liezel Huber and Rachel McQuillan won the title by defeating Janet Lee and Wynne Prakusya 6–2, 6–0 in the final. It was the 2nd title for Huber and the 16th title for McQuillan in their respective doubles careers.

== Seeds ==
1. (Slovenia) Tina Križan / (Slovenia) Katarina Srebotnik (semifinals)
2. (France) Alexandra Fusai / (Italy) Rita Grande (semifinals)
3. (South Africa) Liezel Huber / (Australia) Rachel McQuillan (champions)
4. (Chinese Taipei) Janet Lee / (Indonesia) Wynne Prakusya (final)

== Draw ==
Key

- Q = Qualifier
- WC = Wild card
- LL = Lucky loser
- Alt = Alternate
- ITF = ITF entry
- PR = Protected ranking
- SR = Special ranking
- SE = Special exempt
- JE = Junior exempt
- JR = Junior Accelerator Programme entrant
- CO = College Accelerator Programme entrant
- NG = Next Gen Accelerator Program entrant
- w/o = Walkover
- r = Retired
- d = Defaulted

=== Draw ===
First round
1	(Slovenia) T Križan (Slovenia) K Srebotnik	6	7^{7}
(Switzerland) E Gagliardi (United States) M Tu	4	6^{5}
(Australia) A Ellwood (Germany) M Weingärtner	3	1
(Japan) A Sugiyama (Japan) Y Yoshida	6	6
3	(South Africa) L Huber (Australia) R McQuillan	7^{7}	6
Q	(South Korea) Y-j Choi (Japan) A Takase	6^{4}	3
(Japan) R Fujiwara (Japan) R Hiraki	6	3	4
(Paraguay) R de los Ríos (South Africa) J Kruger	2	6	6
(Australia) E Dominikovic (Thailand) T Tanasugarn	6	6
(Australia) A Molik (Australia) N Pratt	4	3
(Japan) H Inoue (Japan) M Inoue	2	2
4	(Chinese Taipei) J Lee (Indonesia) W Prakusya	6	6
(Japan) S Asagoe (Slovenia) T Pisnik	6	7^{7}
(Hungary) Z Gubacsi (Hong Kong) K-p Tong	1	6^{0}
WC	(Japan) A Morigami (Japan) M Saeki	5	4
2	(France) A Fusai (Italy) R Grande	7	6

Quarterfinals
1	(Slovenia) T Križan (Slovenia) K Srebotnik	6	2	6
(Japan) A Sugiyama (Japan) Y Yoshida	2	6	3
3	(South Africa) L Huber (Australia) R McQuillan	6	6
(Paraguay) R de los Ríos (South Africa) J Kruger	2	3
(Australia) E Dominikovic (Thailand) T Tanasugarn	6	3	0
4	(Chinese Taipei) J Lee (Indonesia) W Prakusya	4	6	6
(Japan) S Asagoe (Slovenia) T Pisnik	1	1
2	(France) A Fusai (Italy) R Grande	6	6

Semifinals
1	(Slovenia) T Križan (Slovenia) K Srebotnik	6	4	1
3	(South Africa) L Huber (Australia) R McQuillan	3	6	6
4	(Chinese Taipei) J Lee (Indonesia) W Prakusya	6	6
2	(France) A Fusai (Italy) R Grande	2	3

Final
3	(South Africa) L Huber (Australia) R McQuillan	6	6
4	(Chinese Taipei) J Lee (Indonesia) W Prakusya	2	0
