= Torsten Popp =

German tennis player (born 1983)

- Country (sports): Germany
- Born: 25 November 1983 (age 41)
- Prize money: $64,150

Singles
- Career record: 0–2
- Highest ranking: No. 206 (11 Sep 2006)

Doubles
- Career record: 1–1
- Highest ranking: No. 279 (10 Jul 2006)

Torsten Popp (born 25 November 1983) is a German former professional tennis player.

Popp, who comes from Baden-Württemberg, reached a career high singles ranking of 206 in the world while competing professionally and was runner-up in two ATP Challenger events. In 2006 he played in the singles main draws of ATP Tour tournaments in Portschach and Stuttgart. The following year he returned to Stuttgart and entered the doubles main draw with Andreas Beck, with the pair winning their first round match over Nicolás Lapentti and Feliciano López.
