= 2001 AIG Japan Open Tennis Championships =

- Date: 1–7 October
- Edition: 28th
- Surface: Hard / outdoor
- Location: Tokyo, Japan
- Venue: Ariake Coliseum

Champions

Men's singles
- (Australia) Lleyton Hewitt

Women's singles
- (United States) Monica Seles

Men's doubles
- (United States) Rick Leach / (Australia) David Macpherson

Women's doubles
- (South Africa) Liezel Huber / (Australia) Rachel McQuillan
← 2000 ·	Japan Open	· 2002 →

The 2001 AIG Japan Open Tennis Championships was a tennis tournament played on outdoor hard courts at the Ariake Coliseum in Tokyo in Japan that was part of the International Series Gold of the 2001 ATP Tour and of Tier III of the 2001 WTA Tour. The tournament ran from October 1 through October 7, 2001. Lleyton Hewitt and Monica Seles won the singles titles.

== Finals ==
=== Men's singles ===
(Australia) Lleyton Hewitt defeated (Switzerland) Michel Kratochvil 6–4, 6–2

- It was Hewitt's 5th title of the year and the 13th of his career.

=== Women's singles ===
(United States) Monica Seles defeated (Thailand) Tamarine Tanasugarn 6–3, 6–2

- It was Seles' 3rd title of the year and the 56th of her career.

=== Men's doubles ===
(United States) Rick Leach / (Australia) David Macpherson defeated (Australia) Paul Hanley / (Australia) Nathan Healey 1–6, 7–6^{(8–6)}, 7–6^{(7–4)}

- It was Leach's 1st title of the year and the 41st of his career. It was Macpherson's 2nd title of the year and the 15th of his career.

=== Women's doubles ===
(South Africa) Liezel Huber / (Australia) Rachel McQuillan defeated (Chinese Taipei) Janet Lee / (Indonesia) Wynne Prakusya 6–2, 6–0

- It was Huber's 2nd title of the year and the 2nd of her career. It was McQuillan's only title of the year and the 5th of her career.
