= Wesley Moodie =

South African tennis player

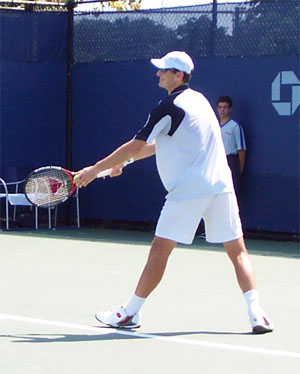
- Country (sports): South Africa
- Residence: Cape Town, South Africa
- Born: 14 February 1979 (age 46) Durban
- Height: 1.96 m (6 ft 5 in)
- Turned pro: 2000
- Retired: July 2011
- Plays: Right-handed (one-handed backhand)
- Prize money: $2,455,112

Singles
- Career record: 58–70
- Career titles: 1
- Highest ranking: No. 57 (10 October 2005)

Grand Slam singles results
- Australian Open: 2R (2006)
- French Open: 1R (2006)
- Wimbledon: 3R (2003)
- US Open: 3R (2006)

Doubles
- Career record: 170–133
- Career titles: 6
- Highest ranking: No. 8 (3 August 2009)

Grand Slam doubles results
- Australian Open: SF (2008)
- French Open: F (2009)
- Wimbledon: W (2005)
- US Open: QF (2009, 2010)

Wesley Moodie (born 14 February 1979) is a former professional tennis player from South Africa who won the 2005 Wimbledon Men's Doubles.

== Career ==
=== Early life and college career ===
He began to play tennis at an early age and won the South African Junior Masters tournament in February 1996.

Moodie played college tennis in the United States from January 1997 until May 2000, originally for Auburn University at Montgomery (AUM), and then from September 1998 at Boise State (BSU). He turned professional in June 2000.

=== Professional career ===
Moodie first came to public notice when he reached the third round at Wimbledon in 2003, losing to Sébastien Grosjean, whom he beat in the United States later that year. Moodie won his first top-flight tour singles event in capturing the 2005 Japan Open, beating fifth seed Mario Ančić in the final 1–6, 7–6, 6–4, after saving two match points in the tie-break (he had also saved four match points in the semifinal against Jarkko Nieminen).

Along with Stephen Huss, who formerly played college tennis for the Auburn Tigers, he became the first qualifier to win the Wimbledon men's doubles championship in 2005, beating the No. 6, 9, 3, 1 & 2 seeds in the process.

Wesley Moodie joined the Monte Carlo Tennis Academy on 9 June 2007.

== Playing style ==
Moodie is a serve-and-volley specialist who has developed his baseline game to a high level of proficiency. His 6 ft 5 in height is combined with a powerful serve.

== Personal ==
Moodie is married to wife Marcia, a teacher. They have a daughter, Danica Jade, born 30 November 2006, two sons, Jason, born 16 February 2011 and Kristian, born 30 June 2015.

== Grand Slam finals ==
=== Doubles: 2 (1 title, 1 runner-up) ===
Result	Year	Championship	Surface	Partner	Opponents	Score
Win	2005	Wimbledon	Grass	(Australia) Stephen Huss	(United States) Bob Bryan (United States) Mike Bryan	7–6^{(7–4)}, 6–3, 6–7^{(2–7)}, 6–3
Loss	2009	French Open	Clay	(Belgium) Dick Norman	(Czech Republic) Lukáš Dlouhý (India) Leander Paes	6–3, 3–6, 2–6

=== Mixed doubles: 1 (1 runner-up) ===
Result	Year	Championship	Surface	Partner	Opponents	Score
Loss	2010	Wimbledon	Grass	(United States) Lisa Raymond	(Zimbabwe) Cara Black (India) Leander Paes	4–6, 6–7^{(5–7)}

== ATP career finals ==
=== Singles: 1 (1 title) ===
Legend Grand Slam tournaments (0–0) ATP Masters Series / ATP World Tour Masters 1000 (0–0) ATP International Series Gold / ATP World Tour 500 Series (1–0) ATP International Series / ATP World Tour 250 Series (0–0)	Finals by surface Hard (1–0) Clay (0–0) Grass (0–0) Carpet (0–0)	Finals by setting Outdoor (1–0) Indoor (0–0)

Result	W–L	Date	Tournament	Tier	Surface	Opponent	Score
Win	1–0	Oct 2005	Japan Open, Tokyo	Intl. Gold	Hard	(Croatia) Mario Ančić	1–6, 7–6^{(9–7)}, 6–4

=== Doubles: 13 (6 titles, 7 runner-ups) ===
Legend Grand Slam tournaments (1–1) ATP Masters Series / ATP World Tour Masters 1000 (0–2) ATP International Series Gold / ATP World Tour 500 Series (0–0) ATP International Series / ATP World Tour 250 Series (5–4)	Finals by surface Hard (1–4) Clay (2–3) Grass (3–0) Carpet (0–0)	Finals by setting Outdoor (6–5) Indoor (0–2)

Result	W–L	Date	Tournament	Tier	Surface	Partner	Opponents	Score
Win	1–0	Jul 2005	Wimbledon, U.K.	Grand Slam	Grass	(Australia) Stephen Huss	(United States) Bob Bryan (United States) Mike Bryan	7–6^{(7–4)}, 6–3, 6–7^{(2–7)}, 6–3
Loss	1–1	Oct 2005	Swiss Indoors, Switzerland	International	Hard (i)	(Australia) Stephen Huss	(Argentina) Agustín Calleri (Chile) Fernando González	5–7, 5–7
Loss	1–2	Feb 2006	Delray Beach Open, U.S.	International	Hard	(South Africa) Chris Haggard	(The Bahamas) Mark Knowles (Canada) Daniel Nestor	2–6, 3–6
Win	2–2	Jan 2007	Adelaide International, Australia	International	Hard	(Australia) Todd Perry	(Serbia) Novak Djokovic (Czech Republic) Radek Štěpánek	6–4, 3–6, [15–13]
Win	3–2	Apr 2007	Valencia Open, Spain	International	Clay	(Australia) Todd Perry	(Switzerland) Yves Allegro (Argentina) Sebastián Prieto	7–5, 7–5
Loss	3–3	Jan 2008	Qatar Open, Doha	International	Hard	(South Africa) Jeff Coetzee	(Germany) Philipp Kohlschreiber (Czech Republic) David Škoch	4–6, 6–4, [9–11]
Win	4–3	Apr 2008	Estoril Open, Portugal	International	Clay	(South Africa) Jeff Coetzee	(United Kingdom) Jamie Murray (Zimbabwe) Kevin Ullyett	6–2, 4–6, [10–8]
Loss	4–4	Nov 2008	Paris Masters, France	Masters	Hard (i)	(South Africa) Jeff Coetzee	(Sweden) Jonas Björkman (Zimbabwe) Kevin Ullyett	2–6, 2–6
Loss	4–5	May 2009	Madrid Open, Spain	Masters 1000	Clay	(Sweden) Simon Aspelin	(Canada) Daniel Nestor (Serbia) Nenad Zimonjić	4–6, 4–6
Loss	4–6	Jun 2009	French Open, Paris	Grand Slam	Clay	(Belgium) Dick Norman	(Czech Republic) Lukáš Dlouhý (India) Leander Paes	6–3, 3–6, 2–6
Win	5–6	Jun 2009	Queen's Club Championships, U.K.	250 Series	Grass	(Russia) Mikhail Youzhny	(Brazil) Marcelo Melo (Brazil) André Sá	6–4, 4–6, [10–6]
Win	6–6	Jun 2009	Rosmalen Championships, Netherlands	250 Series	Grass	(Belgium) Dick Norman	(Sweden) Johan Brunström (Netherlands Antilles) Jean-Julien Rojer	7–6^{(7–3)}, 6–7^{(8–10)}, [10–5]
Loss	6–7	Apr 2010	U.S. Men's Clay Court Championships, U.S.	250 Series	Clay	(Australia) Stephen Huss	(United States) Bob Bryan (United States) Mike Bryan	3–6, 5–7

== Career statistics ==
=== Doubles performance timeline ===
Key
W	F	SF	QF	#R	RR	Q#	DNQ	A	NH

(W) winner; (F) finalist; (SF) semifinalist; (QF) quarterfinalist; (#R) rounds 4, 3, 2, 1; (RR) round-robin stage; (Q#) qualification round; (DNQ) did not qualify; (A) absent; (NH) not held; (SR) strike rate (events won / competed); (W–L) win–loss record.

Tournament	1998	1999	2000	2001	2002	2003	2004	2005	2006	2007	2008	2009	2010	2011	Career SR	Career W-L
Grand Slam tournaments
Australian Open	A	A	A	A	A	A	A	3R	3R	3R	SF	2R	1R	1R	0 / 7	11–7
French Open	A	A	A	A	A	A	A	A	2R	1R	2R	F	SF	1R	0 / 6	10–6
Wimbledon	A	A	A	A	A	A	A	W	3R	3R	2R	SF	SF	QF	1 / 7	21–6
US Open	A	A	A	A	A	A	A	1R	1R	1R	A	QF	QF	A	0 / 5	6–5
Grand Slam SR	0 / 0	0 / 0	0 / 0	0 / 0	0 / 0	0 / 0	0 / 0	1 / 3	0 / 4	0 / 4	0 / 3	0 / 4	0 / 4	0 / 3	1 / 27	N/A
Annual win–loss	0–0	0–0	0–0	0–0	0–0	0–0	0–0	8–2	5–4	4–4	6–3	12–4	9–4	2–3	N/A	48–24
ATP Masters Series
Indian Wells	A	A	A	A	A	A	A	A	1R	A	2R	1R	A	A	0 / 3	1–3
Miami	A	A	A	A	A	A	A	A	QF	A	SF	2R	1R	A	0 / 4	6–4
Monte Carlo	A	A	A	A	A	A	A	A	A	A	SF	2R	SF	A	0 / 3	6–3
Rome	A	A	A	A	A	A	A	A	2R	A	2R	1R	2R	2R	0 / 5	0–5
Madrid (Stuttgart)	A	A	A	A	A	A	A	A	A	A	SF	F	2R	QF	0 / 4	7–4
Canada	A	A	A	A	A	A	A	1R	A	A	A	QF	A	A	0 / 2	1–2
Cincinnati	A	A	A	A	A	A	A	QF	A	A	A	QF	SF	A	0 / 3	5–3
Shanghai	Not Held											QF	2R	A	0 / 2	0–2
Paris	A	A	A	A	A	A	A	A	A	A	F	2R	QF	A	0 / 3	4–3
Hamburg	A	A	A	A	A	A	A	A	2R	A	2R	NM1			0 / 2	1–2
Masters Series SR	0 / 0	0 / 0	0 / 0	0 / 0	0 / 0	0 / 0	0 / 0	0 / 2	0 / 4	0 / 0	0 / 7	0 / 9	0 / 7	0 / 2	0 / 31	N/A
Annual win–loss	0–0	0–0	0–0	0–0	0–0	0–0	0–0	2–2	3–4	0–0	11–7	7–9	7–7	1–2	N/A	31–31
Year-end ranking	1384	–	285	200	188	178	172	24	47	49	14	10	14	182	N/A	
