= Tim Crichton =

Australian tennis player

- Country (sports): Australia
- Born: 15 April 1976 (age 50)
- Plays: Right-handed
- Prize money: $95,519

Doubles
- Career record: 7–26
- Career titles: 0
- Highest ranking: No. 88 (12 August 2002)

Grand Slam doubles results
- Australian Open: 1R (2000, 2001, 2002)
- French Open: 2R (2002)
- Wimbledon: 2R (2002)
- US Open: 1R (2002)

Timothy Crichton (born 15 April 1976) is a former professional tennis player from Australia.

Crichton, partnering Ashley Fisher, made the semi-finals of the 2001 Chevrolet Cup in Chile, his best result on the ATP Tour. Also that year he was a quarter-finalist in the Japan Open, with Michaël Llodra as his teammate.

In 2002 he competed in the Men's Doubles at all four Grand Slams and made the second round twice. In that year's French Open, Crichton and countryman Todd Perry defeated Karsten Braasch and Andrei Olhovskiy. He then partnered Mark Merklein at the Wimbledon Championships and the pair had a win over Luke Milligan and Kyle Spencer.

== Challenger titles ==
=== Doubles: (9) ===
No.	Year	Tournament	Surface	Partner	Opponents	Score
1.	2000	Ostend, Belgium	Clay	(Australia) Ashley Fisher	(Argentina) Francisco Cabello (Argentina) Damián Furmanski	6–2, 2–6, 6–1
2.	2000	Austin, United States	Hard	(Australia) Ashley Fisher	(Netherlands) Raemon Sluiter (Netherlands) Dennis van Scheppingen	6–1, 6–7^{(6–8)}, 6–0
3.	2000	Seoul, South Korea	Hard	(Australia) Ashley Fisher	(Czech Republic) František Čermák (Czech Republic) Ota Fukárek	6–4, 6–4
4.	2001	Singapore	Hard	(Australia) Ashley Fisher	(United States) Brandon Hawk (United Kingdom) Kyle Spencer	3–6, 6–3, 6–4
5.	2001	Graz, Austria	Hard	(Australia) Todd Perry	(South Africa) Shaun Rudman (United States) Jeff Williams	6–4, 6–4
6.	2001	Curitiba, Brazil	Clay	(Australia) Ashley Fisher	(Portugal) Emanuel Couto (Portugal) Pedro Pereira	6–3, 6–4
7.	2001	Helsinki, Finland	Carpet	(United States) Jim Thomas	(North Macedonia) Aleksandar Kitinov (United States) Jack Waite	6–3, 6–4
8.	2002	Valencia, Spain	Clay	(Australia) Todd Perry	(Germany) Marcus Hilpert (South Africa) Shaun Rudman	W/O
9.	2002	Segovia, Spain	Hard	(Australia) Todd Perry	(Slovakia) Karol Beck (Netherlands) Sander Groen	5–7, 7–6^{(7–3)}, 6–4
