= 2011 Wimbledon Championships – Men's doubles qualifying =

Men's doubles qualifying
- 2011 Wimbledon Championships

Events
Singles	men	women		boys	girls
Doubles	men	women	mixed	boys	girls
WC Singles	men	women	quad
WC Doubles	men	women	quad
Legends	men	women	seniors

Qualification
Singles	men	women
Doubles	men	women
- Wimbledon Championships

Players and pairs who neither have high enough rankings nor receive wild cards may participate in a qualifying tournament held one week before the annual Wimbledon Tennis Championships.

== Seeds ==
1. (Russia) Mikhail Elgin / (Russia) Alexander Kudryavtsev (first round)
2. (Thailand) Sanchai Ratiwatana / (Thailand) Sonchat Ratiwatana (qualifying competition, lucky losers)
3. (Germany) Martin Emmrich / (Sweden) Andreas Siljeström (first round)
4. (Philippines) Treat Huey / (South Africa) Izak van der Merwe (qualified)
5. (Czech Republic) Leoš Friedl / (United States) David Martin (qualifying competition, lucky losers)
6. (United States) Brian Battistone / (India) Purav Raja (first round)
7. (United States) Ryan Harrison / (United States) Travis Rettenmaier (qualified)
8. (Slovakia) Karol Beck / (Czech Republic) David Škoch (qualified)

== Qualifiers ==
1. (United States) Ryan Harrison / (United States) Travis Rettenmaier
2. (Slovakia) Karol Beck / (Czech Republic) David Škoch
3. (United Kingdom) David Rice / (United Kingdom) Sean Thornley
4. (Philippines) Treat Huey / (South Africa) Izak van der Merwe

== Lucky losers ==
1. (Thailand) Sanchai Ratiwatana / (Thailand) Sonchat Ratiwatana
2. (Czech Republic) Leoš Friedl / (United States) David Martin
3. (Slovakia) Lukáš Lacko / (Czech Republic) Lukáš Rosol
4. (Italy) Alessandro Motti / (France) Stéphane Robert
5. (Italy) Flavio Cipolla / (Italy) Paolo Lorenzi

== Qualifying draw ==
=== First qualifier ===
First round
1	(Russia) Mikhail Elgin (Russia) Alexander Kudryavtsev	6	6^{5}	4
(Slovakia) Lukáš Lacko (Czech Republic) Lukáš Rosol	2	7^{7}	6
(South Africa) Rik de Voest (Israel) Dudi Sela	4	6	3
7	(United States) Ryan Harrison (United States) Travis Rettenmaier	6	3	6

Qualifying competition
(Slovakia) Lukáš Lacko (Czech Republic) Lukáš Rosol	6	3	4
7	(United States) Ryan Harrison (United States) Travis Rettenmaier	4	6	6

=== Second qualifier ===
First round
2	(Thailand) Sanchai Ratiwatana (Thailand) Sonchat Ratiwatana	7^{7}	6
(Denmark) Frederik Nielsen (Netherlands) Thomas Schoorel	6^{1}	3
WC	(United Kingdom) Liam Broady (United Kingdom) Oliver Golding	3	4
8	(Slovakia) Karol Beck (Czech Republic) David Škoch	6	6

Qualifying competition
2	(Thailand) Sanchai Ratiwatana (Thailand) Sonchat Ratiwatana	3	4
8	(Slovakia) Karol Beck (Czech Republic) David Škoch	6	6

=== Third qualifier ===
First round
3	(Germany) Martin Emmrich (Sweden) Andreas Siljeström	6^{3}	6^{7}
(Italy) Alessandro Motti (France) Stéphane Robert	7^{7}	7^{9}
WC	(United Kingdom) David Rice (United Kingdom) Sean Thornley	6	6
6	(United States) Brian Battistone (India) Purav Raja	2	4

Qualifying competition
(Italy) Alessandro Motti (France) Stéphane Robert	5	6	4
WC	(United Kingdom) David Rice (United Kingdom) Sean Thornley	7	4	6

=== Fourth qualifier ===
First round
4	(Philippines) Treat Huey (South Africa) Izak van der Merwe	6	7
(Portugal) Rui Machado (United States) Travis Parrott	3	5
(Italy) Flavio Cipolla (Italy) Paolo Lorenzi	2	3
5	(Czech Republic) Leoš Friedl (United States) David Martin	6	6

Qualifying competition
4	(Philippines) Treat Huey (South Africa) Izak van der Merwe	7^{7}	6
5	(Czech Republic) Leoš Friedl (United States) David Martin	6^{4}	1
