= 2011 Wimbledon Championships – Men's singles qualifying =

Men's singles qualifying
- 2011 Wimbledon Championships

Events
Singles	men	women		boys	girls
Doubles	men	women	mixed	boys	girls
WC Singles	men	women	quad
WC Doubles	men	women	quad
Legends	men	women	seniors

Qualification
Singles	men	women
Doubles	men	women
- Wimbledon Championships

Players and pairs who neither have high enough rankings nor receive wild cards may participate in a qualifying tournament held one week before the annual Wimbledon Tennis Championships.

== Seeds ==
1. (Czech Republic) Lukáš Rosol (first round)
2. (Poland) Łukasz Kubot (qualified)
3. (Portugal) Rui Machado (first round)
4. (Netherlands) Thomas Schoorel (second round)
5. (Japan) Tatsuma Ito (first round)
6. (Belgium) Steve Darcis (second round, retired)
7. (Germany) Dustin Brown (first round)
8. (Turkey) Marsel İlhan (first round)
9. (Italy) Flavio Cipolla (qualified)
10. (France) Stéphane Robert (first round)
11. (Italy) Paolo Lorenzi (first round)
12. (France) Marc Gicquel (qualifying competition, lucky loser)
13. (Italy) Simone Bolelli (qualifying competition, lucky loser)
14. (United States) Ryan Harrison (qualifying competition, lucky loser)
15. (Czech Republic) Ivo Minář (second round)
16. (Japan) Go Soeda (qualifying competition, lucky loser)
17. (Slovakia) Karol Beck (qualified)
18. (South Africa) Izak van der Merwe (first round)
19. (Germany) Daniel Brands (first round)
20. (Slovakia) Lukáš Lacko (qualified)
21. (Brazil) Rogério Dutra da Silva (second round)
22. (Switzerland) Stéphane Bohli (first round)
23. (Germany) Simon Greul (first round)
24. (United States) Bobby Reynolds (first round)
25. (Germany) Andreas Beck (qualified)
26. (Slovakia) Martin Kližan (first round, retired)
27. (Austria) Martin Fischer (qualified)
28. (Russia) Alexandre Kudryavtsev (second round)
29. (France) Édouard Roger-Vasselin (qualified)
30. (Australia) Marinko Matosevic (qualified)
31. (Italy) Alessio di Mauro (first round)
32. (South Africa) Rik de Voest (qualified)

== Qualifiers ==
1. (Netherlands) Igor Sijsling
2. (Poland) Łukasz Kubot
3. (Australia) Bernard Tomic
4. (Australia) Marinko Matosevic
5. (Germany) Andreas Beck
6. (Slovakia) Karol Beck
7. (South Africa) Rik de Voest
8. (Austria) Martin Fischer
9. (Italy) Flavio Cipolla
10. (Canada) Frank Dancevic
11. (Republic of Ireland) Conor Niland
12. (France) Édouard Roger-Vasselin
13. (France) Kenny de Schepper
14. (Germany) Cedrik-Marcel Stebe
15. (Belgium) Ruben Bemelmans
16. (Slovakia) Lukáš Lacko

== Lucky losers ==
1. (France) Marc Gicquel
2. (Italy) Simone Bolelli
3. (United States) Ryan Harrison
4. (Japan) Go Soeda
5. (Slovenia) Grega Žemlja

== Qualifying draw ==
=== First qualifier ===
First round
1	(Czech Republic) Lukáš Rosol	6	3	3
(Belgium) David Goffin	3	6	6
(Argentina) Facundo Bagnis	2	6^{3}
(Belarus) Uladzimir Ignatik	6	7^{7}
(Brazil) Fernando Romboli	6	1	4
(Spain) Iván Navarro	3	6	6
(Netherlands) Igor Sijsling	6	2
26	(Slovakia) Martin Kližan	1	0^{r}

Second round
(Belgium) David Goffin	3	6	7
(Belarus) Uladzimir Ignatik	6	1	5
(Spain) Iván Navarro	7^{11}	1	5
(Netherlands) Igor Sijsling	6^{9}	6	7

Qualifying competition
(Belgium) David Goffin	6^{7}	3	6	5
(Netherlands) Igor Sijsling	7^{9}	6	4	7

=== Second qualifier ===
First round
2	(Poland) Łukasz Kubot	6	6
(Serbia) Nikola Ćirić	2	3
(Colombia) Juan Sebastián Cabal	6^{5}	6	4
(Croatia) Kristijan Mesaroš	7^{7}	1	6
(United States) Rajeev Ram	6^{4}	4
(France) Augustin Gensse	7^{7}	6
(France) Charles-Antoine Brézac	3	7	6
24	(United States) Bobby Reynolds	6	5	3

Second round
2	(Poland) Łukasz Kubot	6	4	6
(Croatia) Kristijan Mesaroš	2	6	4
(France) Augustin Gensse	7^{7}	3	6
(France) Charles-Antoine Brézac	6^{2}	6	3

Qualifying competition
2	(Poland) Łukasz Kubot	6	7^{9}	6^{4}	6
(France) Augustin Gensse	3	6^{7}	7^{7}	1

=== Third qualifier ===
First round
3	(Portugal) Rui Machado	6	4	2
(Colombia) Robert Farah	4	6	6
(Australia) Bernard Tomic	6	5	6
(Germany) Sebastian Rieschick	4	7	4
PR	(Monaco) Jean-René Lisnard	4
(Dominican Republic) Víctor Estrella Burgos	0^{r}
(Croatia) Franko Škugor	0^{r}
21	(Brazil) Rogério Dutra Silva	2

Second round
(Colombia) Robert Farah	1	4
(Australia) Bernard Tomic	6	6
PR	(Monaco) Jean-René Lisnard	6	4	6
21	(Brazil) Rogério Dutra Silva	4	6	4

Qualifying competition
(Australia) Bernard Tomic	6	6	6
PR	(Monaco) Jean-René Lisnard	1	4	1

=== Fourth qualifier ===
First round
4	(Netherlands) Thomas Schoorel	3	7^{7}	6
(Canada) Peter Polansky	6	6^{5}	4
(Slovakia) Marek Semjan	6^{2}	6^{5}
(Australia) Chris Guccione	7^{7}	7^{7}
(Slovakia) Ivo Klec	3	0
(France) Guillaume Rufin	6	6
(Germany) Alexander Flock	2	4
30	(Australia) Marinko Matosevic	6	6

Second round
4	(Netherlands) Thomas Schoorel	6^{5}	2
(Australia) Chris Guccione	7^{7}	6
(France) Guillaume Rufin	4	4
30	(Australia) Marinko Matosevic	6	6

Qualifying competition
(Australia) Chris Guccione	6^{9}	7^{7}	6^{3}	6	1
30	(Australia) Marinko Matosevic	7^{11}	6^{3}	7^{7}	4	6

=== Fifth qualifier ===
First round
5	(Japan) Tatsuma Ito	6	4	4
(Brazil) Ricardo Hocevar	2	6	6
(Estonia) Jürgen Zopp	6	2
(Ecuador) Giovanni Lapentti	1	0^{r}
WC	(United Kingdom) George Morgan	3	4
WC	(United Kingdom) Jamie Baker	6	6
(Ukraine) Sergei Bubka	6^{3}	3
25	(Germany) Andreas Beck	7^{7}	6

Second round
(Brazil) Ricardo Hocevar	4	7^{7}	5
(Estonia) Jürgen Zopp	6	6^{4}	7
WC	(United Kingdom) Jamie Baker	3	6^{5}
25	(Germany) Andreas Beck	6	7^{7}

Qualifying competition
(Estonia) Jürgen Zopp	6	4	6	3	3
25	(Germany) Andreas Beck	2	6	4	6	6

=== Sixth qualifier ===
First round
6	(Belgium) Steve Darcis	6^{4}	6	13
(Serbia) Ilija Bozoljac	7^{7}	4	11
(Slovakia) Andrej Martin	2	1
(Switzerland) Marco Chiudinelli	6	6
(Australia) Peter Luczak	6^{8}	3
(Denmark) Frederik Nielsen	7^{10}	6
WC	(United Kingdom) Daniel Smethurst	2	3
17	(Slovakia) Karol Beck	6	6

Second round
6	(Belgium) Steve Darcis	3	0^{r}
(Switzerland) Marco Chiudinelli	6	3
(Denmark) Frederik Nielsen	6^{0}	2
17	(Slovakia) Karol Beck	7^{7}	6

Qualifying competition
(Switzerland) Marco Chiudinelli	5	6	4	3
17	(Slovakia) Karol Beck	7	3	6	6

=== Seventh qualifier ===
First round
7	(Germany) Dustin Brown	4	6	6
(Slovenia) Grega Žemlja	6	3	8
(Romania) Victor Crivoi	3	6^{3}
(Brazil) Júlio Silva	6	7^{7}
(Romania) Adrian Ungur	6^{5}	4
(Bosnia and Herzegovina) Amer Delić	7^{7}	6
(Argentina) Federico Delbonis	3	4
32	(South Africa) Rik de Voest	6	6

Second round
(Slovenia) Grega Žemlja	6	6
(Brazil) Júlio Silva	4	4
(Bosnia and Herzegovina) Amer Delić	4	6^{4}
32	(South Africa) Rik de Voest	6	7^{7}

Qualifying competition
(Slovenia) Grega Žemlja	2	7^{7}	2	4
32	(South Africa) Rik de Voest	6	6^{5}	6	6

=== Eighth qualifier ===
First round
8	(Turkey) Marsel İlhan	4	7^{7}	13
(Poland) Jerzy Janowicz	6	6^{4}	15
WC	(United Kingdom) Oliver Golding	6	6
WC	(United Kingdom) Joshua Milton	3	2
(Italy) Gianluca Naso	6	1	2
(United States) Alex Kuznetsov	4	6	6
(Slovakia) Pavol Červenák	4	2
27	(Austria) Martin Fischer	6	6

Second round
(Poland) Jerzy Janowicz	7^{7}	6
WC	(United Kingdom) Oliver Golding	6^{3}	1
(United States) Alex Kuznetsov	4	2
27	(Austria) Martin Fischer	6	6

Qualifying competition
(Poland) Jerzy Janowicz	4	7^{7}	6	3	6
27	(Austria) Martin Fischer	6	6^{5}	4	6	8

=== Ninth qualifier ===
First round
9	(Italy) Flavio Cipolla	6	6
(Australia) James Lemke	4	3
PR	(Germany) Benedikt Dorsch	3	5
(Spain) Daniel Muñoz de la Nava	6	7
(Spain) Roberto Bautista Agut	6	4
(Czech Republic) Dušan Lojda	0	2^{r}
WC	(United Kingdom) Liam Broady	6	1	12
31	(Italy) Alessio di Mauro	3	6	10

Second round
9	(Italy) Flavio Cipolla	2	6	6
(Spain) Daniel Muñoz de la Nava	6	3	4
(Spain) Roberto Bautista Agut	6	6
WC	(United Kingdom) Liam Broady	1	2

Qualifying competition
9	(Italy) Flavio Cipolla	2	6	7^{12}	7
(Spain) Roberto Bautista Agut	6	2	6^{10}	5

=== Tenth qualifier ===
First round
10	(France) Stéphane Robert	2	4
(Canada) Frank Dancevic	6	6
(Australia) Carsten Ball	4	6	4
(Thailand) Danai Udomchoke	6	3	6
(Argentina) Andrés Molteni	4	1
(France) Grégoire Burquier	6	6
(Italy) Marco Crugnola	2	7^{7}	6
18	(South Africa) Izak van der Merwe	6	6^{1}	3

Second round
(Canada) Frank Dancevic	6	6
(Thailand) Danai Udomchoke	1	4
(France) Grégoire Burquier	3	3
(Italy) Marco Crugnola	6	6

Qualifying competition
(Canada) Frank Dancevic	6	6	6
(Italy) Marco Crugnola	2	2	3

=== Eleventh qualifier ===
First round
11	(Italy) Paolo Lorenzi	5	6	2
(Australia) Greg Jones	7	4	6
(France) Josselin Ouanna	3	6	6
(Republic of Ireland) Conor Niland	6	4	8
(Croatia) Nikola Mektić	6	6
(Germany) Dominik Meffert	2	2
(Russia) Andrey Kuznetsov	7^{7}	6
22	(Switzerland) Stéphane Bohli	6^{4}	4

Second round
(Australia) Greg Jones	6	5	2
(Republic of Ireland) Conor Niland	4	7	6
(Croatia) Nikola Mektić	6	7^{7}
(Russia) Andrey Kuznetsov	1	6^{5}

Qualifying competition
(Republic of Ireland) Conor Niland	6	7^{7}	6
(Croatia) Nikola Mektić	3	6^{5}	4

=== Twelfth qualifier ===
First round
12	(France) Marc Gicquel	6	6
PR	(United States) Zack Fleishman	4	2
(Germany) Bastian Knittel	7^{11}	6
WC	(United Kingdom) Alex Bogdanovic	6^{9}	3
(Canada) Vasek Pospisil	4	6	6
(Chile) Jorge Aguilar	6	3	2
(Croatia) Antonio Veić	3	1
29	(France) Édouard Roger-Vasselin	6	6

Second round
12	(France) Marc Gicquel	6	6
(Germany) Bastian Knittel	4	4
(Canada) Vasek Pospisil	4	5
29	(France) Édouard Roger-Vasselin	6	7

Qualifying competition
12	(France) Marc Gicquel	4	6	6^{3}	2
29	(France) Édouard Roger-Vasselin	6	4	7^{7}	6

=== Thirteenth qualifier ===
First round
13	(Italy) Simone Bolelli	7^{7}	6
(Israel) Amir Weintraub	6^{4}	3
(France) Vincent Millot	3	6	2
(Germany) Simon Stadler	6	2	6
(France) Kenny de Schepper	6	6
(Hungary) Ádám Kellner	3	4
(Australia) Matthew Ebden	4	7^{7}	6
23	(Germany) Simon Greul	6	6^{4}	4

Second round
13	(Italy) Simone Bolelli	6	6
(Germany) Simon Stadler	3	1
(France) Kenny de Schepper	7^{7}	7^{7}
(Australia) Matthew Ebden	6^{5}	6^{4}

Qualifying competition
13	(Italy) Simone Bolelli	6	6^{5}	7^{7}	6^{7}	2
(France) Kenny de Schepper	3	7^{7}	6^{2}	7^{9}	6

=== Fourteenth qualifier ===
First round
14	(United States) Ryan Harrison	6^{4}	7^{7}	6
WC	(United Kingdom) Alexander Ward	7^{7}	6^{4}	3
(Portugal) João Sousa	6^{3}	6	2
(France) Laurent Rochette	7^{7}	2	6
(Germany) Cedrik-Marcel Stebe	6	6
(Italy) Matteo Viola	4	4
(Germany) Björn Phau	4	4
28	(Russia) Alexander Kudryavtsev	6	6

Second round
14	(United States) Ryan Harrison	6	6
(France) Laurent Rochette	3	3
(Germany) Cedrik-Marcel Stebe	5	6	6
28	(Russia) Alexander Kudryavtsev	7	4	2

Qualifying competition
14	(United States) Ryan Harrison	3	5	6	6	5
(Germany) Cedrik-Marcel Stebe	6	7	1	4	7

=== Fifteenth qualifier ===
First round
15	(Czech Republic) Ivo Minář	6^{7}	6	6
(Argentina) Leonardo Mayer	7^{9}	4	1
(Spain) Guillermo Olaso	6	4	6
(France) Olivier Patience	2	6	4
(United States) Jesse Witten	3	4
(Belgium) Ruben Bemelmans	6	6
(Japan) Yūichi Sugita	3	6	10
19	(Germany) Daniel Brands	6	3	8

Second round
15	(Czech Republic) Ivo Minář	5	7	4
(Spain) Guillermo Olaso	7	5	6
(Belgium) Ruben Bemelmans	3	6	16
(Japan) Yūichi Sugita	6	4	14

Qualifying competition
(Spain) Guillermo Olaso	6^{4}	3	2
(Belgium) Ruben Bemelmans	7^{7}	6	6

=== Sixteenth qualifier ===
First round
16	(Japan) Go Soeda	6	6
(United States) Lester Cook	4	4
WC	(Hungary) Márton Fucsovics	7^{7}	6
(France) Jonathan Eysseric	6^{4}	1
(Australia) John Millman	6	3	5
(South Africa) Fritz Wolmarans	2	6	7
(Spain) Guillermo Alcaide	2	5
20	(Slovakia) Lukáš Lacko	6	7

Second round
16	(Japan) Go Soeda	6	6
WC	(Hungary) Márton Fucsovics	4	3
(South Africa) Fritz Wolmarans	2	7^{7}	8
20	(Slovakia) Lukáš Lacko	6	6^{5}	10

Qualifying competition
16	(Japan) Go Soeda	4	6	2	4
20	(Slovakia) Lukáš Lacko	6	4	6	6
