= 2011 Wimbledon Championships – Women's singles qualifying =

Women's singles qualifying
- 2011 Wimbledon Championships

Events
Singles	men	women		boys	girls
Doubles	men	women	mixed	boys	girls
WC Singles	men	women	quad
WC Doubles	men	women	quad
Legends	men	women	seniors

Qualification
Singles	men	women
Doubles	men	women
- Wimbledon Championships

Players and pairs who neither have high enough rankings nor receive wild cards may participate in a qualifying tournament held one week before the annual Wimbledon Tennis Championships.

== Seeds ==
1. (Spain) Nuria Llagostera Vives (second round)
2. (Chinese Taipei) Chan Yung-jan (first round)
3. (Netherlands) Arantxa Rus (second round)
4. (United States) Irina Falconi (qualified)
5. (Thailand) Tamarine Tanasugarn (qualified)
6. (Romania) Edina Gallovits-Hall (second round)
7. (Italy) Maria Elena Camerin (second round)
8. (Spain) Carla Suárez Navarro (second round)
9. (Czech Republic) Eva Birnerová (second round)
10. (France) Iryna Brémond (first round)
11. (Czech Republic) Renata Voráčová (first round)
12. (United States) Sloane Stephens (second round)
13. (Japan) Junri Namigata (qualifying competition)
14. (France) Stéphanie Foretz Gacon (qualifying competition, lucky loser)
15. (Ukraine) Lesia Tsurenko (qualified)
16. (Austria) Yvonne Meusburger (second round)
17. (Japan) Misaki Doi (qualified)
18. (Japan) Kurumi Nara (second round)
19. (Chinese Taipei) Chang Kai-chen (qualified)
20. (Spain) Sílvia Soler Espinosa (qualifying competition, retired)
21. (Poland) Urszula Radwańska (first round)
22. (Luxembourg) Mandy Minella (first round)
23. (Canada) Stéphanie Dubois (qualifying competition, lucky loser)
24. (Russia) Valeria Savinykh (second round)

== Qualifiers ==
1. (Chinese Taipei) Chang Kai-chen
2. (New Zealand) Marina Erakovic
3. (Italy) Camila Giorgi
4. (United States) Irina Falconi
5. (Thailand) Tamarine Tanasugarn
6. (Ukraine) Lesia Tsurenko
7. (Russia) Vitalia Diatchenko
8. (Japan) Misaki Doi
9. (Czech Republic) Kristýna Plíšková
10. (Germany) Mona Barthel
11. (United States) Alexa Glatch
12. (Canada) Aleksandra Wozniak

== Lucky losers ==
1. (France) Stéphanie Foretz Gacon
2. (Canada) Stéphanie Dubois

== Qualifying draw ==
=== First qualifier ===
First round
1	(Spain) Nuria Llagostera Vives	6	6
(Germany) Tatjana Malek	3	3
(Slovakia) Zuzana Kučová	6	6
(United States) Julia Cohen	4	2
(Thailand) Noppawan Lertcheewakarn	6	7
(Japan) Kumiko Iijima	1	5
(Bulgaria) Elitsa Kostova	4	0
19	(Chinese Taipei) Chang Kai-chen	6	6

Second round
1	(Spain) Nuria Llagostera Vives	4	4
(Slovakia) Zuzana Kučová	6	6
(Thailand) Noppawan Lertcheewakarn	4	4
19	(Chinese Taipei) Chang Kai-chen	6	6

Qualifying competition
(Slovakia) Zuzana Kučová	3	6^{3}
19	(Chinese Taipei) Chang Kai-chen	6	7^{7}

=== Second qualifier ===
First round
2	(Chinese Taipei) Chan Yung-jan	2	1
(New Zealand) Marina Erakovic	6	6
(Slovenia) Maša Zec Peškirič	3	6^{4}
(Australia) Sophie Ferguson	6	7^{7}
(Japan) Erika Sema	6	6
(Croatia) Ana Vrljić	4	4
(Ukraine) Yuliya Beygelzimer	5	4
20	(Spain) Sílvia Soler Espinosa	7	6

Second round
(New Zealand) Marina Erakovic	6	6
(Australia) Sophie Ferguson	2	4
(Japan) Erika Sema	3	2
20	(Spain) Sílvia Soler Espinosa	6	6

Qualifying competition
(New Zealand) Marina Erakovic	2
20	(Spain) Sílvia Soler Espinosa	0^{r}

=== Third qualifier ===
First round
3	(Netherlands) Arantxa Rus	6	6
(France) Olivia Sanchez	4	4
(Russia) Alexandra Panova	4	5
(United States) Lindsay Lee-Waters	6	7
WC	(United Kingdom) Samantha Murray	1	3
(Italy) Camila Giorgi	6	6
WC	(United Kingdom) Tara Moore	2	2
16	(Austria) Yvonne Meusburger	6	6

Second round
3	(Netherlands) Arantxa Rus	7^{7}	6^{3}	4
(United States) Lindsay Lee-Waters	6^{1}	7^{7}	6
(Italy) Camila Giorgi	2	7	6
16	(Austria) Yvonne Meusburger	6	5	3

Qualifying competition
(United States) Lindsay Lee-Waters	1	4
(Italy) Camila Giorgi	6	6

=== Fourth qualifier ===
First round
4	(United States) Irina Falconi	6	6
(Germany) Anna-Lena Grönefeld	3	0
(Romania) Elena Bogdan	6	3	9
(China) Lu Jingjing	3	6	7
(New Zealand) Sacha Jones	6^{8}	2
(Ukraine) Olga Savchuk	7^{10}	6
(Slovakia) Kristína Kučová	3	3
13	(Japan) Junri Namigata	6	6

Second round
4	(United States) Irina Falconi	6	6
(Romania) Elena Bogdan	2	2
(Ukraine) Olga Savchuk	3	6	3
13	(Japan) Junri Namigata	6	3	6

Qualifying competition
4	(United States) Irina Falconi	6	6
13	(Japan) Junri Namigata	3	2

=== Fifth qualifier ===
First round
5	(Thailand) Tamarine Tanasugarn	6	6
(Turkey) Çağla Büyükakçay	2	0
(Croatia) Ajla Tomljanović	0	7^{7}	0^{r}
(Russia) Regina Kulikova	6	6^{4}	2
(Ukraine) Mariya Koryttseva	6	7
Alt	(Germany) Laura Siegemund	4	5
(Greece) Eirini Georgatou	2	0
14	(France) Stéphanie Foretz Gacon	6	6

Second round
5	(Thailand) Tamarine Tanasugarn	6	6
(Russia) Regina Kulikova	4	1
(Ukraine) Mariya Koryttseva	6	4	6
14	(France) Stéphanie Foretz Gacon	4	6	8

Qualifying competition
5	(Thailand) Tamarine Tanasugarn	6	6
14	(France) Stéphanie Foretz Gacon	3	3

=== Sixth qualifier ===
First round
6	(Romania) Edina Gallovits-Hall	6	6
(Argentina) Florencia Molinero	1	2
(Slovakia) Lenka Wienerová	2	6^{2}
(Ukraine) Tetiana Luzhanska	6	7^{7}
(Spain) Lara Arruabarrena	2	7	0
(Spain) Beatriz García Vidagany	6	5	6
WC	(United Kingdom) Francesca Stephenson	0	1
15	(Ukraine) Lesia Tsurenko	6	6

Second round
6	(Romania) Edina Gallovits-Hall	1	1
(Ukraine) Tetiana Luzhanska	6	6
(Spain) Beatriz García Vidagany	6	6^{2}	0
15	(Ukraine) Lesia Tsurenko	4	7^{7}	6

Qualifying competition
(Ukraine) Tetiana Luzhanska	4	5
15	(Ukraine) Lesia Tsurenko	6	7

=== Seventh qualifier ===
First round
7	(Italy) Maria Elena Camerin	6	6
(Serbia) Aleksandra Krunić	2	1
(Russia) Vitalia Diatchenko	6	6
(Israel) Julia Glushko	1	4
WC	(Australia) Casey Dellacqua	3	5
(Canada) Heidi El Tabakh	6	7
WC	(United Kingdom) Anna Fitzpatrick	1	1
23	(Canada) Stéphanie Dubois	6	6

Second round
7	(Italy) Maria Elena Camerin	3	3
(Russia) Vitalia Diatchenko	6	6
(Canada) Heidi El Tabakh	3	2
23	(Canada) Stéphanie Dubois	6	6

Qualifying competition
(Russia) Vitalia Diatchenko	6	6
23	(Canada) Stéphanie Dubois	3	2

=== Eighth qualifier ===
First round
8	(Spain) Carla Suárez Navarro	6^{4}	7^{7}	6
(Switzerland) Stefanie Vögele	7^{7}	6^{2}	2
(Russia) Ekaterina Ivanova	7^{7}	6
(China) Han Xinyun	6^{5}	3
WC	(United Kingdom) Melanie South	6	6
(Romania) Liana Ungur	4	4
(United States) Madison Brengle	6	1	4
17	(Japan) Misaki Doi	3	6	6

Second round
8	(Spain) Carla Suárez Navarro	2	4
(Russia) Ekaterina Ivanova	6	6
WC	(United Kingdom) Melanie South	5	3
17	(Japan) Misaki Doi	7	6

Qualifying competition
(Russia) Ekaterina Ivanova	5	4
17	(Japan) Misaki Doi	7	6

=== Ninth qualifier ===
First round
9	(Czech Republic) Eva Birnerová	6	6
(Luxembourg) Anne Kremer	4	4
(France) Laura Thorpe	3	2
WC	(Czech Republic) Kristýna Plíšková	6	6
(Russia) Arina Rodionova	6	5	6
(Kazakhstan) Sesil Karatantcheva	3	7	2
(Slovakia) Lenka Juríková	4	3
18	(Japan) Kurumi Nara	6	6

Second round
9	(Czech Republic) Eva Birnerová	3	2
WC	(Czech Republic) Kristýna Plíšková	6	6
(Russia) Arina Rodionova	6	6
18	(Japan) Kurumi Nara	3	4

Qualifying competition
WC	(Czech Republic) Kristýna Plíšková	4	6	6
(Russia) Arina Rodionova	6	3	2

=== Tenth qualifier ===
First round
10	(France) Iryna Brémond	6	1	3
(Italy) Anna Floris	3	6	6
(Spain) Estrella Cabeza Candela	6	6
(Italy) Corinna Dentoni	2	0
(Romania) Alexandra Cadanțu	4	5
(Germany) Mona Barthel	6	7
(Netherlands) Michaëlla Krajicek	4	4
24	(Russia) Valeria Savinykh	6	6

Second round
(Italy) Anna Floris	4	6^{5}
(Spain) Estrella Cabeza Candela	6	7^{7}
(Germany) Mona Barthel	6	7^{7}
24	(Russia) Valeria Savinykh	1	6^{3}

Qualifying competition
(Spain) Estrella Cabeza Candela	2	2
(Germany) Mona Barthel	6	6

=== Eleventh qualifier ===
First round
11	(Czech Republic) Renata Voráčová	4	4
(United States) Alexa Glatch	6	6
(Australia) Sally Peers	0	6^{6}
(France) Caroline Garcia	6	7^{8}
(Poland) Magda Linette	5	3
(Kazakhstan) Galina Voskoboeva	7	6
(France) Nathalie Piquion	6	3	6
22	(Luxembourg) Mandy Minella	3	6	4

Second round
(United States) Alexa Glatch	6	6
(France) Caroline Garcia	1	0
(Kazakhstan) Galina Voskoboeva	6	6
(France) Nathalie Piquion	1	0

Qualifying competition
(United States) Alexa Glatch	3	7^{7}	12
(Kazakhstan) Galina Voskoboeva	6	6^{2}	10

=== Twelfth qualifier ===
First round
12	(United States) Sloane Stephens	6	6
WC	(United Kingdom) Jade Windley	1	4
(Romania) Raluca Olaru	0	6^{7}
(Russia) Nina Bratchikova	6	7^{9}
(Germany) Kathrin Wörle	2	6	6
(Argentina) María Irigoyen	6	4	2
(Canada) Aleksandra Wozniak	6	6
21	(Poland) Urszula Radwańska	4	3

Second round
12	(United States) Sloane Stephens	2	6	3
(Russia) Nina Bratchikova	6	4	6
(Germany) Kathrin Wörle	2	3
(Canada) Aleksandra Wozniak	6	6

Qualifying competition
(Russia) Nina Bratchikova	6	4	2
(Canada) Aleksandra Wozniak	3	6	6
