= 2011 Wimbledon Championships – Women's doubles qualifying =

Women's doubles qualifying
- 2011 Wimbledon Championships

Events
| Singles | men | women | | boys | girls |
| Doubles | men | women | mixed | boys | girls |
| WC Singles | men | women | quad |
| WC Doubles | men | women | quad |
| Legends | men | women | seniors |

Qualification
| Singles | men | women |
| Doubles | men | women |
- Wimbledon Championships

Players and pairs who neither have high enough rankings nor receive wild cards may participate in a qualifying tournament held one week before the annual Wimbledon Tennis Championships.

== Seeds ==
1. (Latvia) Līga Dekmeijere / (Croatia) Darija Jurak (first round)
2. (Japan) Shuko Aoyama / (Japan) Rika Fujiwara (qualified)
3. (Czech Republic) Eva Birnerová / (Czech Republic) Petra Cetkovská (first round)
4. (United States) Lindsay Lee-Waters / (United States) Megan Moulton-Levy (qualified)
5. (New Zealand) Marina Erakovic / (Thailand) Tamarine Tanasugarn (qualifying competition, lucky losers)
6. (Thailand) Noppawan Lertcheewakarn / (Australia) Jessica Moore (qualifying competition, lucky losers)
7. (Russia) Nina Bratchikova / (Russia) Valeria Savinykh (qualifying competition)
8. (Romania) Elena Bogdan / (Ukraine) Lesia Tsurenko (first round)

== Qualifiers ==
1. (Russia) Vesna Dolonc / (Hungary) Katalin Marosi
2. (Japan) Shuko Aoyama / (Japan) Rika Fujiwara
3. (Poland) Urszula Radwańska / (Russia) Arina Rodionova
4. (United States) Lindsay Lee-Waters / (United States) Megan Moulton-Levy

== Lucky losers ==
1. (New Zealand) Marina Erakovic / (Thailand) Tamarine Tanasugarn
2. (Thailand) Noppawan Lertcheewakarn / (Australia) Jessica Moore
3. (France) Sophie Lefèvre / (Russia) Evgeniya Rodina

== Qualifying draw ==
=== First qualifier ===
First round
1 | (Latvia) Līga Dekmeijere (Croatia) Darija Jurak | 0 | 4
(Russia) Vesna Dolonc (Hungary) Katalin Marosi | 6 | 6
(United States) Irina Falconi (Germany) Kathrin Wörle | 6 | 6
8 | (Romania) Elena Bogdan (Ukraine) Lesia Tsurenko | 3 | 1

Qualifying competition
(Russia) Vesna Dolonc (Hungary) Katalin Marosi | 6 | 6
(United States) Irina Falconi (Germany) Kathrin Wörle | 2 | 3

=== Second qualifier ===
First round
2 | (Japan) Shuko Aoyama (Japan) Rika Fujiwara | 4 | 6 | 6
(France) Iryna Brémond (France) Aurélie Védy | 6 | 3 | 3
(France) Sophie Lefèvre (Russia) Evgeniya Rodina | 1 | 3
5 | (New Zealand) Marina Erakovic (Thailand) Tamarine Tanasugarn | 6 | 6

Qualifying competition
2 | (Japan) Shuko Aoyama (Japan) Rika Fujiwara | 6 | 6
5 | (New Zealand) Marina Erakovic (Thailand) Tamarine Tanasugarn | 3 | 2

=== Third qualifier ===
First round
3 | (Czech Republic) Eva Birnerová (Czech Republic) Petra Cetkovská | 1 | 6 | 2
(Poland) Urszula Radwańska (Russia) Arina Rodionova | 6 | 3 | 6
WC | (United Kingdom) Samantha Murray (United Kingdom) Jade Windley | 6 | 2 | 5
6 | (Thailand) Noppawan Lertcheewakarn (Australia) Jessica Moore | 1 | 6 | 7

Qualifying competition
(Poland) Urszula Radwańska (Russia) Arina Rodionova | 6 | 6
6 | (Thailand) Noppawan Lertcheewakarn (Australia) Jessica Moore | 3 | 4

=== Fourth qualifier ===
First round
4 | (United States) Lindsay Lee-Waters (United States) Megan Moulton-Levy | 6 | 6
(Netherlands) Arantxa Rus (Georgia (country)) Anna Tatishvili | 3 | 3
WC | (United Kingdom) Anna Fitzpatrick (United Kingdom) Katie O'Brien | 3 | 3
7 | (Russia) Nina Bratchikova (Russia) Valeria Savinykh | 6 | 6

Qualifying competition
4 | (United States) Lindsay Lee-Waters (United States) Megan Moulton-Levy | 6^{6} | 6 | 8
7 | (Russia) Nina Bratchikova (Russia) Valeria Savinykh | 7^{8} | 4 | 6
