= 2011 Wimbledon Championships – Day-by-day summaries =

The 2011 Wimbledon Championships are described below in detail, in the form of day-by-day summaries.

== Day 1 (20 June) ==
- Seeds out:
  - Gentlemen's Singles: (Brazil) Thomaz Bellucci [30]
  - Ladies' Singles: (Estonia) Kaia Kanepi [17], (Israel) Shahar Pe'er [22], (Russia) Ekaterina Makarova [28]
- Schedule of Play

Matches on main courts
Matches on Centre Court
Event	Winner	Loser	Score
Gentlemen's Singles 1st Round	(Spain) Rafael Nadal [1]	(United States) Michael Russell	6–4, 6–2, 6–2
Ladies' Singles 1st Round	(Italy) Francesca Schiavone [6]	(Australia) Jelena Dokic	6–4, 1–6, 6–3
Gentlemen's Singles 1st Round	(United Kingdom) Andy Murray [4]	(Spain) Daniel Gimeno Traver	4–6, 6–3, 6–0, 6–0
Matches on No. 1 Court
Event	Winner	Loser	Score
Ladies' Singles 1st Round	(Russia) Vera Zvonareva [2]	(United States) Alison Riske	6–0, 3–6, 6–3
Gentlemen's Singles 1st Round	(Czech Republic) Tomáš Berdych [6]	(Italy) Filippo Volandri	6–2, 6–2, 6–1
Matches on No. 2 Court
Event	Winner	Loser	Score
Ladies' Singles 1st Round	(United States) Venus Williams [23]	(Uzbekistan) Akgul Amanmuradova	6–3, 6–1
Gentlemen's Singles 1st Round	(France) Gaël Monfils [9]	(Germany) Matthias Bachinger	6–4, 7–6^{(7–3)}, 6–3
Ladies' Singles 1st Round	(Slovakia) Magdaléna Rybáriková vs. (Belarus) Victoria Azarenka [4]		4–6, 2–3, suspended
Matches on No. 3 Court
Event	Winner	Loser	Score
Ladies' Singles 1st Round	(Japan) Kimiko Date-Krumm	(United Kingdom) Katie O'Brien [WC]	6–0 7–5
Gentlemen's Singles 1st Round	(Switzerland) Stan Wawrinka [14]	(Italy) Potito Starace	6–3, 6–4, 6–4

== Day 2 (21 June) ==
- Seeds out:
  - Gentlemen's Singles: (Ukraine) Alexandr Dolgopolov [22], (Serbia) Janko Tipsarević [23], (Croatia) Marin Čilić [27], (Russia) Nikolay Davydenko [29]
  - Ladies' Singles: (Australia) Samantha Stosur [10], (Serbia) Jelena Janković [15]
- Schedule of Play

Matches on main courts
Matches on Centre Court
Event	Winner	Loser	Score
Ladies' Singles 1st Round	(United States) Serena Williams [7]	(France) Aravane Rezaï	6–3, 3–6, 6–1
Gentlemen's Singles 1st Round	(Switzerland) Roger Federer [3]	(Kazakhstan) Mikhail Kukushkin	7–6^{(7–2)}, 6–4, 6–2
Gentlemen's Singles 1st Round	(Serbia) Novak Djokovic [2]	(France) Jérémy Chardy	6–4, 6–1, 6–1
Ladies' Singles 1st Round	(Russia) Maria Sharapova [5]	(Russia) Anna Chakvetadze	6–2, 6–1
Matches on No. 1 Court
Event	Winner	Loser	Score
Gentlemen's Singles 1st Round	(United States) Andy Roddick [8]	(Germany) Andreas Beck [Q]	6–4, 7–6^{(8–6)}, 6–3
Ladies' Singles 1st Round	(Denmark) Caroline Wozniacki [1]	(Spain) Arantxa Parra Santonja	6–2, 6–1
Gentlemen's Singles 1st Round	(Sweden) Robin Söderling [5]	(Germany) Philipp Petzschner	6–4, 6–4, 2–6, 7–6^{(7–5)}
Matches on No. 2 Court
Event	Winner	Loser	Score
Gentlemen's Singles 1st Round	(Spain) Fernando Verdasco [21]	(Czech Republic) Radek Štěpánek	2–6, 4–6, 6–3, 7–6^{(8–6)}, 9–7
Ladies' Singles 1st Round	(Belarus) Victoria Azarenka [4]	(Slovakia) Magdaléna Rybáriková	6–4, 3–2, ret.
Gentlemen's Singles 1st Round	(France) Michaël Llodra [19]	(United Kingdom) James Ward [WC]	6–3, 7–6^{(7–4)}, 6–3
Ladies' Singles 1st Round	(China) Li Na [3]	(Russia) Alla Kudryavtseva	6–3, 6–3
Matches on No. 3 Court
Event	Winner	Loser	Score
Ladies' Singles 1st Round	(Spain) María José Martínez Sánchez	(Serbia) Jelena Janković [15]	5–7, 6–4, 6–3
Gentlemen's Singles 1st Round	(Croatia) Ivan Ljubičić	(Croatia) Marin Čilić [27]	7–6^{(7–2)}, 3–6, 6–3, 6–4
Gentlemen's Singles 1st Round	(Spain) David Ferrer [7]	(France) Benoît Paire	6–4, 6–4, 6–4
Gentlemen's Singles 1st Round	(United States) John Isner	(France) Nicolas Mahut	7–6^{(7–4)}, 6–2, 7–6^{(8–6)}

== Day 3 (22 June) ==
- Seeds out:
  - Gentlemen's Singles: (Switzerland) Stan Wawrinka [14], (Spain) Fernando Verdasco [21], (Argentina) Juan Ignacio Chela [25], (Canada) Milos Raonic [31]
  - Ladies' Singles: (United States) Bethanie Mattek-Sands [30]
  - Ladies' Doubles: (Chinese Taipei) Chuang Chia-jung / (Chinese Taipei) Hsieh Su-wei [15]
- Schedule of Play

Matches on main courts
Matches on Centre Court
Event	Winner	Loser	Score
Ladies' Singles 2nd Round	(United States) Venus Williams [23]	(Japan) Kimiko Date-Krumm	6–7^{(6–8)}, 6–3, 8–6
Gentlemen's Singles 2nd Round	(Spain) Rafael Nadal [1]	(United States) Ryan Sweeting	6–3, 6–2, 6–4
Gentlemen's Singles 2nd Round	(United States) Andy Roddick [8]	(Romania) Victor Hănescu	6–4, 6–3, 6–4
Matches on No. 1 Court
Event	Winner	Loser	Score
Gentlemen's Singles 2nd Round	(Czech Republic) Tomáš Berdych [6]	(France) Julien Benneteau	6–1, 6–4, 6–2
Gentlemen's Singles 2nd Round	(United Kingdom) Andy Murray [4]	(Germany) Tobias Kamke	6–3, 6–3, 7–5
Ladies' Singles 2nd Round	(Czech Republic) Petra Kvitová [8]	(United Kingdom) Anne Keothavong	6–2, 6–1
Matches on No. 2 Court
Event	Winner	Loser	Score
Gentlemen's Singles 2nd Round	(United States) Mardy Fish [10]	(Uzbekistan) Denis Istomin	7–6^{(8–6)}, 6–4, 6–4
Ladies' Singles 2nd Round	(Russia) Vera Zvonareva [2]	(Russia) Elena Vesnina	6–1, 7–6^{(7–5)}
Gentlemen's Singles 2nd Round	(Argentina) Juan Martín del Potro [24] vs. (Belgium) Olivier Rochus		6–7^{(7–9)}, suspended
Matches on No. 3 Court
Event	Winner	Loser	Score
Ladies' Singles 1st Round	(France) Mathilde Johansson	(United Kingdom) Heather Watson [WC]	2–6, 6–4, 6–4
Gentlemen's Singles 2nd Round	(Luxembourg) Gilles Müller [WC]	(Canada) Milos Raonic [31]	2–3, retired
Ladies' Singles 2nd Round	(Germany) Andrea Petkovic	(Canada) Stéphanie Dubois [LL]	6–3, 4–6, 6–3

== Day 4 (23 June) ==
- Seeds out:
  - Gentlemen's Singles: (Serbia) Viktor Troicki [13], (Germany) Florian Mayer [20], (Spain) Guillermo García López [26]
  - Ladies' Singles: (China) Li Na [3], (Poland) Agnieszka Radwańska [13], (Russia) Anastasia Pavlyuchenkova [14], (Czech Republic) Lucie Šafářová [31]
  - Gentlemen's Doubles: (India) Rohan Bopanna / (Pakistan) Aisam-ul-Haq Qureshi [4]
- Schedule of Play

Matches on main courts
Matches on Centre Court
Event	Winner	Loser	Score
Gentlemen's Singles 2nd Round	(Sweden) Robin Söderling [5]	(Australia) Lleyton Hewitt	6–7^{(5–7)}, 3–6, 7–5, 6–4, 6–4
Ladies' Singles 2nd Round	(Germany) Sabine Lisicki [WC]	(China) Li Na [3]	3–6, 6–4, 8–6
Gentlemen's Singles 2nd Round	(Switzerland) Roger Federer [3]	(France) Adrian Mannarino	6–2, 6–3, 6–2
Matches on No. 1 Court
Event	Winner	Loser	Score
Gentlemen's Singles 2nd Round	(Serbia) Novak Djokovic [2]	(South Africa) Kevin Anderson	6–3, 6–4, 6–2
Gentlemen's Singles 2nd Round	(France) Jo-Wilfried Tsonga [12]	(Bulgaria) Grigor Dimitrov	6–7^{(4–7)}, 6–4, 6–4, 7–6^{(10–8)}
Matches on No. 2 Court
Event	Winner	Loser	Score
Ladies' Singles 2nd Round	(United States) Serena Williams [7]	(Romania) Simona Halep	3–6, 6–2, 6–1
Gentlemen's Singles 2nd Round	(Argentina) Juan Martín del Potro [24]	(Belgium) Olivier Rochus	6–7^{(7–9)}, 6–1, 6–0, 6–4
Gentlemen's Singles 2nd Round	(Spain) David Ferrer [7] vs. (United States) Ryan Harrison [LL]		6–7^{(8–6)}, 6–1, 4–6, 4–2, suspended
Matches on No. 3 Court
Event	Winner	Loser	Score
Ladies' Singles 2nd Round	(Italy) Francesca Schiavone [6]	(Czech Republic) Barbora Záhlavová-Strýcová	7–5, 6–3
Gentlemen's Singles 2nd Round	(Cyprus) Marcos Baghdatis [32]	(Italy) Andreas Seppi	6–4, 7–6^{(7–4)}, 7–5
Gentlemen's Singles 2nd Round	(Russia) Igor Andreev vs. (Australia) Bernard Tomic [Q]		6–4, 7–5, 3–6, suspended

== Day 5 (24 June) ==
- Seeds out:
  - Gentlemen's Singles: (United States) Andy Roddick [8]
  - Ladies' Singles: (Russia) Vera Zvonareva [2], (Germany) Andrea Petkovic [11], (Russia) Svetlana Kuznetsova [12], (Slovakia) Daniela Hantuchová [25], (Italy) Roberta Vinci [29]
  - Gentlemen's Doubles: (Poland) Mariusz Fyrstenberg / (Poland) Marcin Matkowski [7], (Spain) Marc López / (Spain) David Marrero [15]
  - Ladies' Doubles: (Czech Republic) Andrea Hlaváčková / (Czech Republic) Lucie Hradecká [7]
- Schedule of Play

Matches on main courts
Matches on Centre Court
Event	Winner	Loser	Score
Gentlemen's Singles 3rd Round	(Spain) Feliciano López	(United States) Andy Roddick [8]	7–6^{(7–2)}, 7–6^{(7–2)}, 6–4
Ladies' Singles 3rd Round	(Belarus) Victoria Azarenka [4]	(Slovakia) Daniela Hantuchová [25]	6–3, 3–6, 6–2
Gentlemen's Singles 3rd Round	(United Kingdom) Andy Murray [4]	(Croatia) Ivan Ljubičić	6–4, 4–6, 6–1, 7–6^{(7–4)}
Matches on No. 1 Court
Event	Winner	Loser	Score
Ladies' Singles 2nd Round	(Russia) Maria Sharapova [5]	(United Kingdom) Laura Robson [WC]	7–6^{(7–4)}, 6–3
Ladies' Singles 3rd Round	(United States) Venus Williams [23]	(Spain) María José Martínez Sánchez	6–0, 6–2
Gentlemen's Singles 3rd Round	(Spain) Rafael Nadal [1] vs. (Luxembourg) Gilles Müller [WC]		7–6^{(8–6)}, suspended
Matches on No. 2 Court
Event	Winner	Loser	Score
Ladies' Singles 2nd Round	(Denmark) Caroline Wozniacki [1]	(France) Virginie Razzano	6–1, 6–3
Gentlemen's Singles 2nd Round	(Spain) David Ferrer [7]	(United States) Ryan Harrison [LL]	6–7^{(8–6)}, 6–1, 4–6, 6–3, 6–2
Ladies' Singles 3rd Round	(Bulgaria) Tsvetana Pironkova [32]	(Russia) Vera Zvonareva [2]	6–2, 6–3
Gentlemen's Singles 3rd Round	(Argentina) Juan Martín del Potro [24] vs. (France) Gilles Simon [15]		7–6^{(10–8)}, 2–4, suspended
Matches on No. 3 Court
Event	Winner	Loser	Score
Ladies' Singles 2nd Round	(France) Marion Bartoli [9]	(Spain) Lourdes Domínguez Lino	4–6, 7–5, 6–2
Gentlemen's Singles 2nd Round	(Australia) Bernard Tomic [Q]	(Russia) Igor Andreev	4–6, 5–7, 6–3, 6–4, 6–1
Gentlemen's Singles 3rd Round	(France) Gaël Monfils [9] vs. (Poland) Łukasz Kubot [Q]		3–6, 6–3, 3–3 (40–40), suspended

== Day 6 (25 June) ==
- Seeds out:
  - Gentlemen's Singles: (Sweden) Robin Söderling [5], (France) Gaël Monfils [9], (Austria) Jürgen Melzer [11], (France) Gilles Simon [15], (Spain) Nicolás Almagro [16], (Argentina) David Nalbandian [28], (Cyprus) Marcos Baghdatis [32]
  - Ladies' Singles: (Italy) Francesca Schiavone [6], (Germany) Julia Görges [16], (Serbia) Ana Ivanovic [18], (Italy) Flavia Pennetta [21], (Russia) Maria Kirilenko [26], (Australia) Jarmila Gajdošová [27]
  - Gentlemen's Doubles: (Belarus) Max Mirnyi / (Canada) Daniel Nestor [2], (India) Mahesh Bhupathi / (India) Leander Paes [3], (The Bahamas) Mark Knowles / (Poland) Łukasz Kubot [10], (Brazil) Marcelo Melo / (Brazil) Bruno Soares [13], (Italy) Daniele Bracciali / (Czech Republic) František Čermák [16]
  - Ladies' Doubles: (Germany) Julia Görges / (Russia) Maria Kirilenko [9], (Spain) María José Martínez Sánchez / (Spain) Anabel Medina Garrigues [11]
- Schedule of Play

Matches on main courts
Matches on Centre Court
Event	Winner	Loser	Score
Ladies' Singles 3rd Round	(Denmark) Caroline Wozniacki [1]	(Australia) Jarmila Gajdošová [27]	6–3, 6–2
Gentlemen's Singles 3rd Round	(Switzerland) Roger Federer [3]	(Argentina) David Nalbandian [28]	6–4, 6–2, 6–4
Gentlemen's Singles 3rd Round	(Serbia) Novak Djokovic [2]	(Cyprus) Marcos Baghdatis [32]	6–4, 4–6, 6–3, 6–4
Matches on No. 1 Court
Event	Winner	Loser	Score
Gentlemen's Singles 3rd Round	(Spain) Rafael Nadal [1]	(Luxembourg) Gilles Müller [WC]	7–6^{(8–6)}, 7–6^{(7–5)}, 6–0
Ladies' Singles 3rd Round	(United States) Serena Williams [7]	(Russia) Maria Kirilenko [26]	6–3, 6–2
Gentlemen's Singles 3rd Round	(Australia) Bernard Tomic [Q]	(Sweden) Robin Söderling [5]	6–1, 6–4, 7–5
Matches on No. 2 Court
Event	Winner	Loser	Score
Ladies' Singles 3rd Round	(Russia) Maria Sharapova [5]	(Czech Republic) Klára Zakopalová	6–2, 6–3
Gentlemen's Singles 3rd Round	(Argentina) Juan Martín del Potro [24]	(France) Gilles Simon [15]	7–6^{(10–8)}, 7–6^{(7–5)}, 7–5
Gentlemen's Singles 3rd Round	(France) Jo-Wilfried Tsonga [12]	(Chile) Fernando González [PR]	6–3, 6–4, 6–3
Matches on No. 3 Court
Event	Winner	Loser	Score
Ladies' Singles 3rd Round	(Slovakia) Dominika Cibulková [24]	(Germany) Julia Görges [16]	6–4, 1–6, 6–3
Gentlemen's Singles 3rd Round	(Poland) Łukasz Kubot [Q]	(France) Gaël Monfils [9]	6–3, 3–6, 6–3, 6–3
Gentlemen's Singles 3rd Round	(Spain) David Ferrer [7]	(Slovakia) Karol Beck [Q]	6–4, 6–3, 6–3
Mixed Doubles 1st Round	(United Kingdom) Ross Hutchins [WC] (United Kingdom) Heather Watson [WC]	(Brazil) Marcelo Melo (Australia) Rennae Stubbs	6–7^{(5–7)}, 6–3, 8–6

== Middle Sunday (26 June) ==
Following tradition, Middle Sunday was a day of rest, with no matches scheduled. Play resumed on the next day.

== Day 7 (27 June) ==
- Seeds out:
  - Gentlemen's Singles: (Czech Republic) Tomáš Berdych [6], (Spain) David Ferrer [7], (France) Richard Gasquet [17], (Russia) Mikhail Youzhny [18], (France) Michaël Llodra [19], (Argentina) Juan Martín del Potro [24]
  - Ladies' Singles: (Denmark) Caroline Wozniacki [1], (United States) Serena Williams [7], (Belgium) Yanina Wickmayer [19], (China) Peng Shuai [20], (United States) Venus Williams [23]
  - Gentlemen's Doubles: (United States) Eric Butorac / (Curaçao) Jean-Julien Rojer [9], (Argentina) Juan Ignacio Chela / (Argentina) Eduardo Schwank [12], (Spain) Marcel Granollers / (Spain) Tommy Robredo [14]
  - Ladies' Doubles: (United States) Vania King / (Kazakhstan) Yaroslava Shvedova [1], (United States) Bethanie Mattek-Sands / (United States) Meghann Shaughnessy [5], (Czech Republic) Iveta Benešová / (Czech Republic) Barbora Záhlavová-Strýcová [10], (Chinese Taipei) Chan Yung-jan / (Romania) Monica Niculescu [12], (Belarus) Olga Govortsova / (Russia) Alla Kudryavtseva [16]
  - Mixed Doubles: (Pakistan) Aisam-ul-Haq Qureshi / (Czech Republic) Květa Peschke [5], (Germany) Philipp Petzschner / (Czech Republic) Barbora Záhlavová-Strýcová [7], (Czech Republic) František Čermák / (Czech Republic) Lucie Hradecká [13], (Spain) David Marrero / (Czech Republic) Andrea Hlaváčková [16]
- Schedule of Play

Matches on main courts
Matches on Centre Court
Event	Winner	Loser	Score
Gentlemen's Singles 4th Round	(United Kingdom) Andy Murray [4]	(France) Richard Gasquet [17]	7–6^{(7–3)}, 6–4, 6–2
Ladies' Singles 4th Round	(Bulgaria) Tsvetana Pironkova [32]	(United States) Venus Williams [23]	6–2, 6–3
Gentlemen's Singles 4th Round	(Spain) Rafael Nadal [1]	(Argentina) Juan Martín del Potro [24]	7–6^{(8–6)}, 3–6, 7–6^{(7–4)}, 6–4
Matches on No. 1 Court
Event	Winner	Loser	Score
Ladies' Singles 4th Round	(France) Marion Bartoli [9]	(United States) Serena Williams [7]	6–3, 7–6^{(8–6)}
Gentlemen's Singles 4th Round	(Serbia) Novak Djokovic [2]	(France) Michaël Llodra [19]	6–3, 6–3, 6–3
Gentlemen's Singles 4th Round	(Switzerland) Roger Federer [3]	(Russia) Mikhail Youzhny [18]	6–7^{(5–7)}, 6–3, 6–3, 6–3
Matches on No. 2 Court
Event	Winner	Loser	Score
Ladies' Singles 4th Round	(Russia) Maria Sharapova [5]	(China) Peng Shuai [20]	6–4, 6–2
Ladies' Singles 4th Round	(Slovakia) Dominika Cibulková [24]	(Denmark) Caroline Wozniacki [1]	1–6, 7–6^{(7–5)}, 7–5
Gentlemen's Singles 4th Round	(United States) Mardy Fish [10]	(Czech Republic) Tomáš Berdych [6]	7–6^{(7–5)}, 6–4, 6–4
Mixed Doubles 2nd Round	(Spain) Feliciano López (Germany) Andrea Petkovic	(Spain) David Marrero [16] (Czech Republic) Andrea Hlaváčková [16]	7–6^{(7–2)}, 6–4
Matches on No. 3 Court
Event	Winner	Loser	Score
Ladies' Singles 4th Round	(Belarus) Victoria Azarenka [4]	(Russia) Nadia Petrova	6–2, 6–2
Gentlemen's Singles 4th Round	(Spain) Feliciano López	(Poland) Łukasz Kubot [Q]	3–6, 6–7^{(5–7)}, 7–6^{(9–7)}, 7–5, 7–5
Gentlemen's Singles 4th Round	(France) Jo-Wilfried Tsonga [12]	(Spain) David Ferrer [7]	6–3, 6–4, 7–6^{(7–1)}

== Day 8 (28 June) ==
- Seeds out:
  - Ladies' Singles: (France) Marion Bartoli [9], (Slovakia) Dominika Cibulková [24], (Bulgaria) Tsvetana Pironkova [32]
  - Ladies' Doubles: (Slovakia) Daniela Hantuchová / (Poland) Agnieszka Radwańska [13], (Zimbabwe) Cara Black / (Israel) Shahar Pe'er [14]
- Schedule of Play

Matches on main courts
Matches on Centre Court
Event	Winner	Loser	Score
Ladies' Singles Quarterfinals	(Germany) Sabine Lisicki [WC]	(France) Marion Bartoli [9]	6–4, 6–7^{(4–7)}, 6–1
Ladies' Singles Quarterfinals	(Russia) Maria Sharapova [5]	(Slovakia) Dominika Cibulková [24]	6–1, 6–1
Ladies' Doubles 3rd Round	(India) Sania Mirza [4] (Russia) Elena Vesnina [4]	(Slovakia) Daniela Hantuchová [13] (Poland) Agnieszka Radwańska [13]	6–4, 6–3
Gentlemen's Invitation Doubles Round Robin	(Croatia) Goran Ivanišević / (Netherlands) Richard Krajicek vs. (United States) Donald Johnson / (United States) Jared Palmer		2–3, suspended
Ladies' Singles Quarterfinals	(Belarus) Victoria Azarenka [4]	(Austria) Tamira Paszek	6–3, 6–1
Matches on No. 1 Court
Event	Winner	Loser	Score
Ladies' Singles Quarterfinals	(Czech Republic) Petra Kvitová [8]	(Bulgaria) Tsvetana Pironkova [32]	6–3, 6–7^{(5–7)}, 6–2
Matches on No. 2 Court
Event	Winner	Loser	Score
Gentlemen's Doubles 3rd Round	(United States) Bob Bryan [1] / (United States) Mike Bryan [1] vs. (Sweden) Simon Aspelin / (Australia) Paul Hanley		6–3, 4–6, 6–7^{(5–7)}, 6–3, 3–3, suspended
Matches on No. 3 Court
Event	Winner	Loser	Score
Ladies' Doubles 3rd Round	(United States) Liezel Huber [3] (United States) Lisa Raymond [3]	(Germany) Angelique Kerber (United States) Christina McHale	6–1, 6–0
Gentlemen's Doubles 3rd Round	(United Kingdom) Colin Fleming [WC] (United Kingdom) Ross Hutchins [WC]	(Australia) Ashley Fisher (Australia) Stephen Huss	6–3, 6–4, 6–2
Ladies' Doubles 3rd Round	(Russia) Vera Dushevina / (Russia) Ekaterina Makarova vs. (Russia) Nadia Petrova [6] / (Australia) Anastasia Rodionova [6]		suspended

== Day 9 (29 June) ==
- Seeds out:
  - Gentlemen's Singles: (Switzerland) Roger Federer [3], (United States) Mardy Fish [10]
  - Gentlemen's Doubles: (South Africa) Wesley Moodie / (Belgium) Dick Norman [11]
  - Ladies' Doubles: (United States) Liezel Huber / (United States) Lisa Raymond [3]
  - Mixed Doubles: (Belarus) Max Mirnyi / (Kazakhstan) Yaroslava Shvedova [2], (Belgium) Dick Norman / (United States) Lisa Raymond [10]
- Schedule of Play

Matches on main courts
Matches on Centre Court
Event	Winner	Loser	Score
Gentlemen's Singles Quarterfinals	(France) Jo-Wilfried Tsonga [12]	(Switzerland) Roger Federer [3]	3–6, 6–7^{(3–7)}, 6–4, 6–4, 6–4
Gentlemen's Singles Quarterfinals	(United Kingdom) Andy Murray [4]	(Spain) Feliciano López	6–3, 6–4, 6–4
Gentlemen's Invitation Doubles Round Robin	(Sweden) Jonas Björkman (Australia) Todd Woodbridge	(United Kingdom) Barry Cowan (France) Cédric Pioline	6–3, 6–4
Matches on No. 1 Court
Event	Winner	Loser	Score
Gentlemen's Singles Quarterfinals	(Serbia) Novak Djokovic [2]	(Australia) Bernard Tomic [Q]	6–2, 3–6, 6–3, 7–5
Gentlemen's Singles Quarterfinals	(Spain) Rafael Nadal [1]	(United States) Mardy Fish [10]	6–3, 6–3, 5–7, 6–4
Ladies' Invitation Doubles Round Robin	(United States) Lindsay Davenport (Switzerland) Martina Hingis	(United States) Gigi Fernández (Belarus) Natasha Zvereva	6–2, 6–2
Matches on No. 2 Court
Event	Winner	Loser	Score
Ladies' Doubles 3rd Round	(Germany) Sabine Lisicki (Australia) Samantha Stosur	(Romania) Sorana Cîrstea (Japan) Ayumi Morita	6–4, 6–3
Gentlemen's Doubles 3rd Round	(United States) Bob Bryan [1] (United States) Mike Bryan [1]	(Sweden) Simon Aspelin (Australia) Paul Hanley	6–3, 4–6, 6–7^{(5–7)}, 6–3, 16–14
Senior Gentlemen's Invitation Doubles Round Robin	(Australia) Pat Cash (Australia) Mark Woodforde	(United States) Kevin Curren (United States) Johan Kriek	4–6, 6–3, [10–5]
Mixed Doubles 2nd Round	(India) Rohan Bopanna [6] (India) Sania Mirza [6]	(United Kingdom) Jamie Murray (Australia) Jarmila Gajdošová	7–6^{(7–5)}, 6–2
Mixed Doubles 2nd Round	(Australia) Paul Hanley (Chinese Taipei) Hsieh Su-wei	(Belarus) Max Mirnyi [2] (Kazakhstan) Yaroslava Shvedova [2]	6–4, 5–7, 6–4
Matches on No. 3 Court
Event	Winner	Loser	Score
Ladies' Doubles 3rd Round	(Russia) Nadia Petrova [6] (Australia) Anastasia Rodionova [6]	(Russia) Vera Dushevina (Russia) Ekaterina Makarova	7–6^{(7–2)}, 6–4
Gentlemen's Doubles 4th Round	(Germany) Christopher Kas (Austria) Alexander Peya	(United Kingdom) Colin Fleming [WC] (United Kingdom) Ross Hutchins [WC]	6–4, 6–4, 6–7^{(2–7)}, 2–6, 6–4
Mixed Doubles 2nd Round	(The Bahamas) Mark Knowles [11] (Russia) Nadia Petrova [11]	(United Kingdom) Jamie Delgado (United Kingdom) Melanie South	7–5, 6–4
Ladies' Invitation Doubles Round Robin	(Spain) Conchita Martínez (France) Nathalie Tauziat	(United Kingdom) Annabel Croft (United Kingdom) Samantha Smith	6–0, 6–3

== Day 10 (30 June) ==
- Seeds out:
  - Ladies' Singles: (Belarus) Victoria Azarenka [4]
  - Gentlemen's Doubles: (Austria) Jürgen Melzer / (Germany) Philipp Petzschner [5]
  - Ladies' Doubles: (Russia) Nadia Petrova / (Australia) Anastasia Rodionova [6], (China) Peng Shuai / (China) Zheng Jie [8]
  - Mixed Doubles: (Serbia) Nenad Zimonjić / (Slovenia) Katarina Srebotnik [3], (Israel) Andy Ram / (United States) Meghann Shaughnessy [15]
- Schedule of Play

Matches on main courts
Matches on Centre Court
Event	Winner	Loser	Score
Ladies' Singles Semifinals	(Czech Republic) Petra Kvitová [8]	(Belarus) Victoria Azarenka [4]	6–1, 3–6, 6–2
Ladies' Singles Semifinals	(Russia) Maria Sharapova [5]	(Germany) Sabine Lisicki [WC]	6–4, 6–3
Gentlemen's Doubles Semifinals	(Sweden) Robert Lindstedt [8] (Romania) Horia Tecău [8]	(Germany) Christopher Kas (Austria) Alexander Peya	6–3, 7–6^{(7–3)}, 6–2
Gentlemen's Invitation Doubles Round Robin	(United States) Justin Gimelstob (United States) Todd Martin	(United Kingdom) Mark Petchey (United Kingdom) Chris Wilkinson	6–3, 7–6^{(7–0)}
Matches on No. 1 Court
Event	Winner	Loser	Score
Gentlemen's Doubles Quarterfinals	(United States) Bob Bryan [1] (United States) Mike Bryan [1]	(Austria) Jürgen Melzer [5] (Germany) Philipp Petzschner [5]	6–3, 6–4, 6–4
Ladies' Doubles Quarterfinals	(Czech Republic) Květa Peschke [2] (Slovenia) Katarina Srebotnik [2]	(China) Peng Shuai [8] (China) Zheng Jie [8]	6–2, 6–7^{(7–9)}, 6–4
Mixed Doubles 3rd Round	(Austria) Jürgen Melzer [9] (Czech Republic) Iveta Benešová [9]	(United States) Rajeev Ram (Romania) Alexandra Dulgheru	6–4, 6–3
Matches on No. 2 Court
Event	Winner	Loser	Score
Mixed Doubles 3rd Round	(India) Rohan Bopanna [6] (India) Sania Mirza [6]	(Czech Republic) Martin Damm [Alt] (Czech Republic) Renata Voráčová [Alt]	6–3, 6–0
Gentlemen's Doubles Quarterfinals	(France) Michaël Llodra [6] (Serbia) Nenad Zimonjić [6]	(United States) James Cerretani (Germany) Philipp Marx	6–7^{(3–7)}, 7–6^{(9–7)}, 7–6^{(7–5)}, 7–5
Mixed Doubles 3rd Round	(Israel) Jonathan Erlich (Israel) Shahar Pe'er	(United Kingdom) Colin Fleming [WC] (United Kingdom) Jocelyn Rae [WC]	6–4, 7–5
Mixed Doubles 3rd Round	(India) Leander Paes [14] (Zimbabwe) Cara Black [14]	(Serbia) Nenad Zimonjić [3] (Slovenia) Katarina Srebotnik [3]	Walkover
Matches on No. 3 Court
Event	Winner	Loser	Score
Ladies' Invitation Doubles Round Robin	(United States) Lindsay Davenport (Switzerland) Martina Hingis	(Bulgaria) Magdalena Maleeva (Austria) Barbara Schett	6–1, 6–1
Mixed Doubles 3rd Round	(Australia) Paul Hanley (Chinese Taipei) Hsieh Su-wei	(Israel) Andy Ram (United States) Meghann Shaughnessy	7–6^{(7–4)}, 7–6^{(7–3)}
Gentlemen's Invitation Doubles Round Robin	(Croatia) Goran Ivanišević (Netherlands) Richard Krajicek	(United Kingdom) Barry Cowan (France) Cédric Pioline	6–4, 6–4
Ladies' Doubles Quarterfinals	(Germany) Sabine Lisicki (Australia) Samantha Stosur	(Russia) Nadia Petrova [6] (Australia) Anastasia Rodionova [6]	7–5, 1–6, 6–1

== Day 11 (1 July) ==
- Seeds out:
  - Gentlemen's Singles: (United Kingdom) Andy Murray [4], (France) Jo-Wilfried Tsonga [12]
  - Gentlemen's Doubles: (France) Michaël Llodra / (Serbia) Nenad Zimonjić [6]
  - Ladies' Doubles: (India) Sania Mirza / (Russia) Elena Vesnina [4]
  - Mixed Doubles: (United States) Bob Bryan / (United States) Liezel Huber [1], (India) Rohan Bopanna / (India) Sania Mirza [6], (The Bahamas) Mark Knowles / (Russia) Nadia Petrova [11], (India) Leander Paes / (Zimbabwe) Cara Black [14]
- Schedule of Play

Matches on main courts
Matches on Centre Court
Event	Winner	Loser	Score
Gentlemen's Singles Semifinals	(Serbia) Novak Djokovic [2]	(France) Jo-Wilfried Tsonga [12]	7–6^{(7–4)}, 6–2, 6–7^{(9–11)}, 6–3
Gentlemen's Singles Semifinals	(Spain) Rafael Nadal [1]	(United Kingdom) Andy Murray [4]	5–7, 6–2, 6–2, 6–4
Matches on No. 1 Court
Event	Winner	Loser	Score
Gentlemen's Doubles Semifinals	(United States) Bob Bryan [1] (United States) Mike Bryan [1]	(France) Michaël Llodra [6] (Serbia) Nenad Zimonjić [6]	6–4, 6–4, 6–7^{(8–10)}, 6–7^{(4–7)}, 9–7
Ladies' Invitation Doubles Round Robin	(United States) Lindsay Davenport (Switzerland) Martina Hingis	(United States) Tracy Austin (United States) Kathy Rinaldi	6–2, 6–3
Gentlemen's Invitation Doubles Round Robin	(Netherlands) Jacco Eltingh (Netherlands) Paul Haarhuis	(United Kingdom) Mark Petchey (United Kingdom) Chris Wilkinson	6–3, 6–4
Matches on No. 3 Court
Event	Winner	Loser	Score
Boys' Singles Semifinals	(United Kingdom) Liam Broady [15]	(Australia) Jason Kubler [WC]	6–4, 6–3
Mixed Doubles 3rd Round	(Canada) Daniel Nestor [8] (Chinese Taipei) Chan Yung-jan [8]	(The Bahamas) Mark Knowles [11] (Russia) Nadia Petrova [11]	7–6^{(8–6)}, 6–2
Mixed Doubles Quarterfinals	(Australia) Paul Hanley (Chinese Taipei) Hsieh Su-wei	(India) Rohan Bopanna [6] (India) Sania Mirza [6]	1–6, 6–2, 6–2
Mixed Doubles Quarterfinals	(Canada) Daniel Nestor [8] (Chinese Taipei) Chan Yung-jan [8]	(India) Leander Paes (Zimbabwe) Cara Black	6–3, 6–2

== Day 12 (2 July) ==
- Seeds out:
  - Ladies' Singles: (Russia) Maria Sharapova [5]
  - Gentlemen's Doubles: (Sweden) Robert Lindstedt / (Romania) Horia Tecău [8]
  - Mixed Doubles: (Canada) Daniel Nestor / (Chinese Taipei) Chan Yung-jan [8]
- Schedule of Play

Matches on main courts
Matches on Centre Court
Event	Winner	Loser	Score
Ladies' Singles Final	(Czech Republic) Petra Kvitová [8]	(Russia) Maria Sharapova [5]	6–3, 6–4
Gentlemen's Doubles Final	(United States) Bob Bryan [1] (United States) Mike Bryan [1]	(Sweden) Robert Lindstedt [8] (Romania) Horia Tecău [8]	6–3, 6–4, 7–6^{(7–2)}
Ladies' Doubles Final	(Czech Republic) Květa Peschke [2] (Slovenia) Katarina Srebotnik [2]	(Germany) Sabine Lisicki (Australia) Samantha Stosur	6–3, 6–1
Matches on No. 1 Court
Event	Winner	Loser	Score
Boys' Singles Final	(Australia) Luke Saville [16]	(United Kingdom) Liam Broady [15]	2–6, 6–4, 6–2
Mixed Doubles Semifinals	(India) Mahesh Bhupathi [4] (Russia) Elena Vesnina [4]	(Australia) Paul Hanley (Chinese Taipei) Hsieh Su-wei	6–2, 3–6, 7–5
Mixed Doubles Semifinals	(Austria) Jürgen Melzer [9] (Czech Republic) Iveta Benešová [9]	(Canada) Daniel Nestor [8] (Chinese Taipei) Chan Yung-jan [8]	6–4, 6–4

== Day 13 (3 July) ==
- Seeds out:
  - Gentlemen's Singles: (Spain) Rafael Nadal [1]
  - Mixed Doubles: (India) Mahesh Bhupathi / (Russia) Elena Vesnina [4]
- Schedule of Play

Matches on main courts
Matches on Centre Court
Event	Winner	Loser	Score
Gentlemen's Singles Final	(Serbia) Novak Djokovic [2]	(Spain) Rafael Nadal [1]	6–4, 6–1, 1–6, 6–3
Mixed Doubles Final	(Austria) Jürgen Melzer [9] (Czech Republic) Iveta Benešová [9]	(India) Mahesh Bhupathi [4] (Russia) Elena Vesnina [4]	6–3, 6–2
Matches on No. 1 Court
Event	Winner	Loser	Score
Girls' Singles Final	(Australia) Ashleigh Barty [12]	(Russia) Irina Khromacheva [3]	7–5, 7–6^{(7–3)}
Senior Gentlemen's Invitation Doubles Final	(Australia) Pat Cash (Australia) Mark Woodforde	(United Kingdom) Jeremy Bates (Sweden) Anders Järryd	6–3, 5–7, [10–5]
Boys' Doubles Final	(United Kingdom) George Morgan [2] (Croatia) Mate Pavić [2]	(United Kingdom) Oliver Golding [1] (Czech Republic) Jiří Veselý [1]	3–6, 6–4, 7–5
