= George Morgan (tennis) =

British tennis player (born 1993)

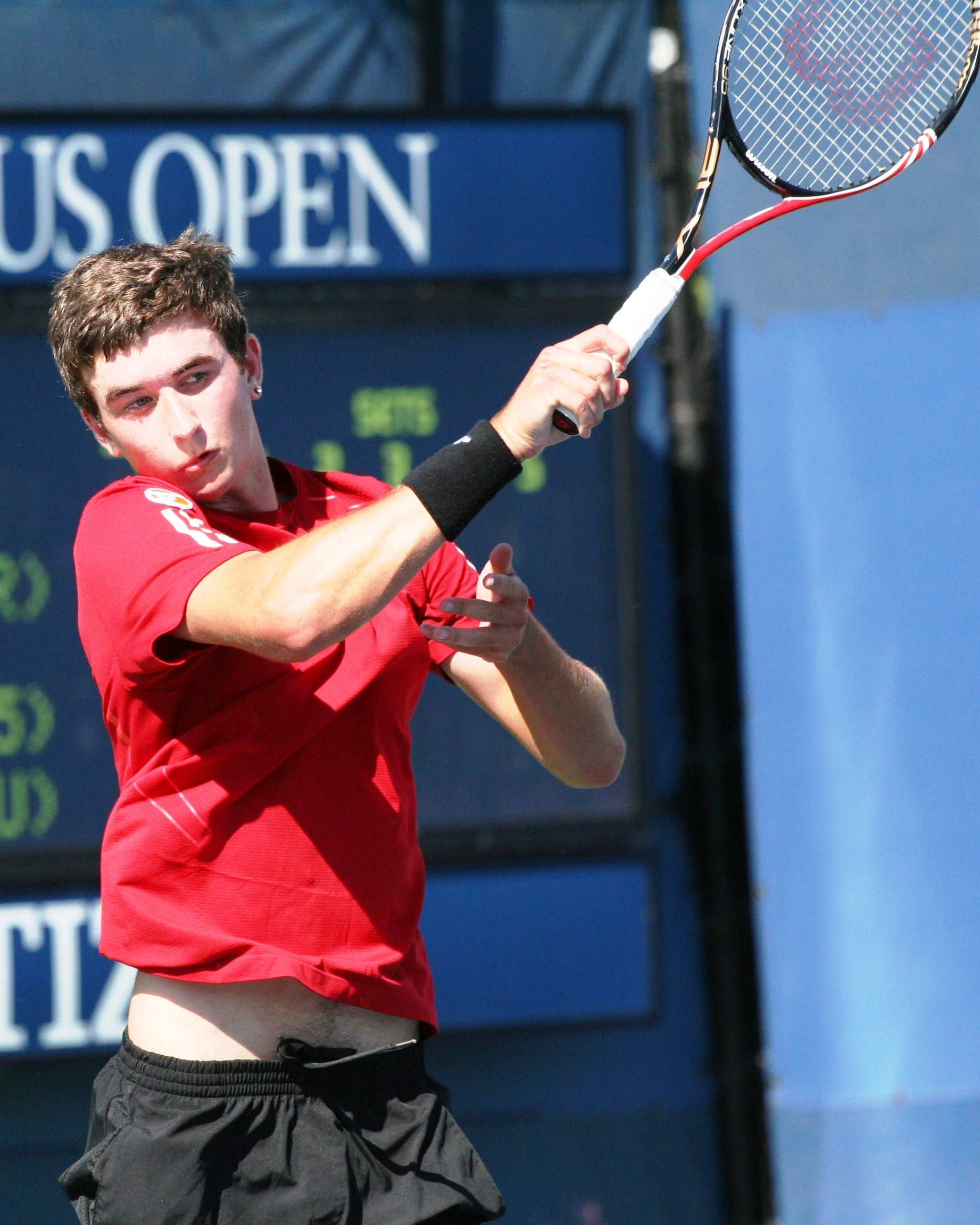
- Country (sports): (United Kingdom) Great Britain
- Residence: Bolton, England
- Born: 7 February 1993 (age 32) England
- Height: 1.90 m (6 ft 3 in)
- Turned pro: 2011
- Plays: Right-handed (two-handed backhand)
- Prize money: $30,935

Singles
- Career record: 0–0 (in ATP World Tour and Grand Slam main draw matches, and in Davis Cup)
- Career titles: 0; 0 Challengers, 1 Futures
- Highest ranking: No. 649 (16 July 2012)

Grand Slam singles results
- Wimbledon: Q1 (2011, 2012)

Doubles
- Career record: 0–1 (in ATP World Tour and Grand Slam main draw matches, and in Davis Cup)
- Career titles: 0; 0 Challengers, 3 Futures
- Highest ranking: No. 510 (17 September 2012)

Grand Slam doubles results
- Wimbledon: 1R (2012)
- Last updated on: 13 October 2021.

George Morgan (born 7 February 1993) is a British tennis player. He won the Boys' Doubles title at the 2011 Wimbledon Championships alongside Mate Pavić.

== Tennis career ==
=== Juniors ===
As a junior Morgan posted a singles win–loss record of 81–41 (74-33 in doubles) and reached a combined ranking of No. 6 in January 2011.

Junior Slam results - Singles:

Australian Open: SF (2011)
French Open: 1R (2011)
Wimbledon: 2R (2011)
US Open: SF (2011)

Junior Slam results - Doubles:

Australian Open: 3R (2011)
French Open: 2R (2011)
Wimbledon: W (2011)
US Open: SF (2011)

=== Pro tour ===
Morgan has won one ITF Futures title in singles and five in doubles.

== Challengers and Futures finals ==
=== Singles: 1 (1 title) ===
| Legend (singles) ATP Challenger Tour (0–0) ITF Futures Tour (1–0) | Titles by surface Hard (1–0) Clay (0–0) Grass (0–0) |

| Result | W–L | Date | Tournament | Tier | Surface | Opponent | Score |
|---|---|---|---|---|---|---|---|
| Win | 1–0 | Sep 2011 | Sweden F5, Danderyd | Futures | Hard (i) | (United Kingdom) Alexander Ward | 4–6, 6–4, 6–4 |

=== Doubles: 8 (5 titles, 3 runner-ups) ===
| Legend (doubles) ATP Challenger Tour (0–0) ITF Futures Tour (5–3) | Titles by surface Hard (4–2) Clay (0–1) Grass (1–0) |

| Result | W–L | Date | Tournament | Tier | Surface | Partner | Opponents | Score |
|---|---|---|---|---|---|---|---|---|
| Win | 1–0 | Sep 2011 | Sweden F5, Danderyd | Futures | Hard (i) | (United Kingdom) Lewis Burton | (Sweden) Tobias Blömgren (Sweden) Jesper Brunstrom | 6–3, 6–2 |
| Loss | 1–1 | May 2012 | Sweden F1, Karlskrona | Futures | Clay | (United Kingdom) Lewis Burton | (France) Albano Olivetti (Chile) Hans Podlipnik-Castillo | 3–6, 6–7^{(3–7)} |
| Win | 2–1 | May 2012 | Sweden F3, Båstad | Futures | Hard (i) | (United Kingdom) Lewis Burton | (Sweden) Pierre Bonfre (Sweden) Viktor Stjern | 6–3, 6–1 |
| Loss | 2–2 | Sep 2012 | Turkey F34, Antalya | Futures | Hard | (Slovakia) Marko Danis | (Turkey) Tuna Altuna (United Kingdom) Brydan Klein | 3–6, 4–6 |
| Win | 3–2 | Oct 2012 | Turkey F40, Adana | Futures | Hard | (United Kingdom) Jack Carpenter | (Moldova) Andrei Ciumac (Egypt) Mohamed Safwat | 6–3, 6–4 |
| Loss | 3–3 | Jun 2013 | Israel F12, Herzliya | Futures | Hard | (United Kingdom) Ashley Hewitt | (Republic of Ireland) Sam Barry (France) Elie Rousset | 1–6, 1–6 |
| Win | 4–3 | Nov 2013 | Great Britain F23, Edgbaston | Futures | Hard (i) | (United Kingdom) Luke Bambridge | (United Kingdom) Scott Clayton (United Kingdom) Jonny O'Mara | 7–5, 4–6, [10–7] |
| Win | 5–3 | Jul 2014 | Great Britain F12, Manchester | Futures | Grass | (United Kingdom) Oliver Golding | (United Kingdom) Edward Corrie (United Kingdom) Joshua Ward-Hibbert | 7–6^{(7–4)}, 4–6, [10–6] |

== Junior Grand Slam finals ==
=== Doubles: 2 (1 title, 1 runner-up) ===
| Result | Year | Tournament | Surface | Partner | Opponents | Score |
|---|---|---|---|---|---|---|
| Loss | 2010 | Wimbledon | Grass | (United Kingdom) Lewis Burton | (United Kingdom) Liam Broady (United Kingdom) Tom Farquharson | 6–7^{(4–7)}, 4–6 |
| Win | 2011 | Wimbledon | Grass | (Croatia) Mate Pavic | (United Kingdom) Oliver Golding (Czech Republic) Jiri Vesely | 3–6, 6–4, 7–5 |

=== Retirement ===
Morgan retired from professional tennis in 2014, playing his final game against Lithuanian Laurynas Grigelis and has since become a tennis coach.
