= 2011 Wimbledon Championships – Girls' doubles =

Girls' doubles
- 2011 Wimbledon Championships

Final
- Champions: (Canada) Eugenie Bouchard (United States) Grace Min
- Runners-up: (Netherlands) Demi Schuurs (China) Tang Haochen
- Score: 5–7, 6–2, 7–5

Events
Singles	men	women		boys	girls
Doubles	men	women	mixed	boys	girls
WC Singles	men	women	quad
WC Doubles	men	women	quad
Legends	men	women	seniors
- Wimbledon Championships

Tímea Babos and Sloane Stephens were the defending champions but were no longer eligible to compete as juniors.

Eugenie Bouchard and Grace Min defeated Demi Schuurs and Tang Haochen in the final, 5–7, 6–2, 7–5 to win the girls' doubles tennis title at the 2011 Wimbledon Championships.

== Seeds ==
1. (Russia) Daria Gavrilova / (Russia) Daria Salnikova (withdrew)
2. (Canada) Eugenie Bouchard / (United States) Grace Min (champions)
3. (Austria) Barbara Haas / (Estonia) Anett Kontaveit (second round)
4. (Australia) Ashleigh Barty / (Japan) Miho Kowase (quarterfinals, withdrew)
5. (United States) Victoria Duval / (Madagascar) Zarah Razafimahatratra (second round)
6. (Czech Republic) Jesika Malečková / (Slovakia) Chantal Škamlová (second round)
7. (Argentina) Victoria Bosio / (Peru) Patricia Kú Flores (first round)
8. (Paraguay) Montserrat González / (Ukraine) Ganna Poznikhirenko (second round)

== Draw ==
Key

- Q = Qualifier
- WC = Wild card
- LL = Lucky loser
- Alt = Alternate
- ITF = ITF entry
- PR = Protected ranking
- SR = Special ranking
- SE = Special exempt
- JE = Junior exempt
- JR = Junior Accelerator Programme entrant
- CO = College Accelerator Programme entrant
- NG = Next Gen Accelerator Program entrant
- w/o = Walkover
- r = Retired
- d = Defaulted

=== Finals ===
Semifinals
(Netherlands) Demi Schuurs (China) Tang Haochen	6	6
(Russia) Irina Khromacheva (Czech Republic) Barbora Krejčíková	2	2
(Brazil) Beatriz Haddad Maia (Russia) Mayya Katsitadze	1	3
2	(Canada) Eugenie Bouchard (United States) Grace Min	6	6

Final
(Netherlands) Demi Schuurs (China) Tang Haochen	7	2	5
2	(Canada) Eugenie Bouchard (United States) Grace Min	5	6	7

=== Top half ===
First round
Alt	(United States) Elizaveta Nemchinov (Ukraine) Taisiya Zakarlyuk	2	0
(Japan) Mami Adachi (Japan) Riko Sawayanagi	6	6
(Netherlands) Demi Schuurs (China) Tang Haochen	6	5	6
(Slovakia) Lucia Butkovská (Serbia) Jovana Jakšić	3	7	4
(Romania) Elena-Teodora Cadar (Ukraine) Sofiya Kovalets	7^{7}	3	2
(Czech Republic) Kamila Pavelková (Czech Republic) Tereza Smitková	6^{1}	6	6
WC	(United Kingdom) Daniela Borthwick (United Kingdom) Ruth Seaborne	1	4
5	(United States) Victoria Duval (Madagascar) Zarah Razafimahatratra	6	6
3	(Austria) Barbara Haas (Estonia) Anett Kontaveit	6	6
WC	(United Kingdom) Katy Dunne (United Kingdom) Jessica Ren	2	1
(Japan) Eri Hozumi (Japan) Miyu Kato	0	3
(United States) Lauren Herring (United States) Madison Keys	6	6
(Russia) Irina Khromacheva (Czech Republic) Barbora Krejčíková	6	6
(Ukraine) Kateryna Kozlova (Bulgaria) Viktoriya Tomova	4	4
WC	(United Kingdom) Sarah Beth Askew (United Kingdom) Pippa Horn	5	4
6	(Czech Republic) Jesika Malečková (Slovakia) Chantal Škamlová	7	6

Second round
(Japan) M Adachi (Japan) R Sawayanagi	4	4
(Netherlands) D Schuurs (China) H Tang	6	6
(Czech Republic) K Pavelková (Czech Republic) T Smitková	6	6
5	(United States) V Duval (Madagascar) Z Razafimahatratra	3	3
3	(Austria) B Haas (Estonia) A Kontaveit	1	0
(United States) L Herring (United States) M Keys	6	6
(Russia) I Khromacheva (Czech Republic) B Krejčíková	6	6
6	(Czech Republic) J Malečková (Slovakia) C Škamlová	3	1

Quarterfinals
(Netherlands) D Schuurs (China) H Tang	6	6
(Czech Republic) K Pavelková (Czech Republic) T Smitková	3	1
(United States) L Herring (United States) M Keys	3	6	3
(Russia) I Khromacheva (Czech Republic) B Krejčíková	6	4	6

Semifinals
(Netherlands) D Schuurs (China) H Tang	6	6
(Russia) I Khromacheva (Czech Republic) B Krejčíková	2	2

=== Bottom half ===
First round
7	(Argentina) Victoria Bosio (Peru) Patricia Kú Flores	3	6	4
(Japan) Makoto Ninomiya (Japan) Risa Ozaki	6	3	6
WC	(United Kingdom) Katie Boulter (United Kingdom) Laura Deigman	6	3	2
(Brazil) Beatriz Haddad Maia (Russia) Mayya Katsitadze	4	6	6
(United States) Catherine Harrison (United States) Christina Makarova	5	3
(Romania) Cristina Dinu (Japan) Nao Hibino	7	6
Alt	(Argentina) Guadalupe Pérez Rojas (Brazil) Laura Pigossi	2	2
4	(Australia) Ashleigh Barty (Japan) Miho Kowase	6	6
8	(Paraguay) Montserrat González (Ukraine) Ganna Poznikhirenko	7	6
(Slovakia) Viktória Maľová (Ukraine) Marianna Zakarlyuk	5	3
(Ecuador) Marie Elise Casares (United States) Stephanie Nauta	3	6	2
(Germany) Katharina Lehnert (Germany) Stephanie Wagner	6	2	6
(Czech Republic) Klára Fabíková (Belarus) Aliaksandra Sasnovich	7	3	6
(Switzerland) Mégane Bianco (Croatia) Donna Vekić	5	6	4
(United Kingdom) Lucy Brown (United Kingdom) Francesca Stephenson	0	3
2	(Canada) Eugenie Bouchard (United States) Grace Min	6	6

Second round
(Japan) M Ninomiya (Japan) R Ozaki	1	3
(Brazil) B Haddad Maia (Russia) M Katsitadze	6	6
(Romania) C Dinu (Japan) N Hibino	7	3	1
4	(Australia) A Barty (Japan) M Kowase	5	6	6
8	(Paraguay) M González (Ukraine) G Poznikhirenko	3	2
(Germany) K Lehnert (Germany) S Wagner	6	6
(Czech Republic) K Fabíková (Belarus) A Sasnovich	3	3
2	(Canada) E Bouchard (United States) G Min	6	6

Quarterfinals
(Brazil) B Haddad Maia (Russia) M Katsitadze
4	(Australia) A Barty (Japan) M Kowase	w/o
(Germany) K Lehnert (Germany) S Wagner	1	3
2	(Canada) E Bouchard (United States) G Min	6	6

Semifinals
(Brazil) B Haddad Maia (Russia) M Katsitadze	1	3
2	(Canada) E Bouchard (United States) G Min	6	6
