= 2011 Wimbledon Championships – Wheelchair women's doubles =

Wheelchair women's doubles
- 2011 Wimbledon Championships

Final
- Champions: (Netherlands) Esther Vergeer (Netherlands) Sharon Walraven
- Runners-up: (Netherlands) Jiske Griffioen (Netherlands) Aniek van Koot
- Score: 6–4, 3–6, 7–5

Events
| Singles | men | women | | boys | girls |
| Doubles | men | women | mixed | boys | girls |
| WC Singles | men | women | quad |
| WC Doubles | men | women | quad |
| Legends | men | women | seniors |
| ← 2010 · | Wimbledon Championships | · 2012 → |

Defending champions Esther Vergeer and Sharon Walraven defeated Jiske Griffioen and Aniek van Koot in the final, 6–4, 3–6, 7–5 to win the ladies' doubles wheelchair tennis title at the 2011 Wimbledon Championships. It was their third step towards an eventual Grand Slam, and Vergeer completed the triple career Grand Slam with the win.

== Seeds ==
1. (Netherlands) Esther Vergeer / (Netherlands) Sharon Walraven (champions)
2. (Netherlands) Jiske Griffioen / (Netherlands) Aniek van Koot (final)

== Draw ==
=== Key ===
- Q = Qualifier
- WC = Wild card
- LL = Lucky loser
- Alt = Alternate
- ITF = ITF entry
- PR = Protected ranking
- SR = Special ranking
- SE = Special exempt
- JE = Junior exempt
- JR = Junior Accelerator Programme entrant
- CO = College Accelerator Programme entrant
- NG = Next Gen Accelerator Program entrant
- w/o = Walkover
- r = Retired
- d = Defaulted

=== Finals ===
Semifinals
1 | (Netherlands) Esther Vergeer (Netherlands) Sharon Walraven | 6 | 6^{5} | 6
WC | (Netherlands) Marjolein Buis (Belgium) Annick Sevenans | 1 | 7^{7} | 2
(United Kingdom) Lucy Shuker (United Kingdom) Jordanne Whiley | 1 | 2
2 | (Netherlands) Jiske Griffioen (Netherlands) Aniek van Koot | 6 | 6

Final
1 | (Netherlands) Esther Vergeer (Netherlands) Sharon Walraven | 6 | 3 | 7
2 | (Netherlands) Jiske Griffioen (Netherlands) Aniek van Koot | 4 | 6 | 5
Third place
WC | (Netherlands) Marjolein Buis (Belgium) Annick Sevenans | 6 | 7^{10}
(United Kingdom) Lucy Shuker (United Kingdom) Jordanne Whiley | 3 | 6^{8}
