= 2011 Wimbledon Championships – Wheelchair men's doubles =

Wheelchair men's doubles
- 2011 Wimbledon Championships

Final
- Champions: (Netherlands) Maikel Scheffers (Netherlands) Ronald Vink
- Runners-up: (France) Stéphane Houdet (France) Michaël Jérémiasz
- Score: 7-5, 6–2

Events
Singles	men	women		boys	girls
Doubles	men	women	mixed	boys	girls
WC Singles	men	women	quad
WC Doubles	men	women	quad
Legends	men	women	seniors
- Wimbledon Championships

Maikel Scheffers and Ronald Vink defeated Stéphane Houdet and Michaël Jérémiasz in the final, 7–5, 6–2 to win the gentlemen's doubles wheelchair tennis title at the 2011 Wimbledon Championships. With the win, Scheffers completed the career Grand Slam.

Robin Ammerlaan and Stefan Olsson were the defending champions, but were defeated by Scheffers and Vink in the semifinals.

== Seeds ==
1. (Netherlands) Maikel Scheffers / (Netherlands) Ronald Vink (champions)
2. (Netherlands) Tom Egberink / (Japan) Shingo Kunieda (semifinals, fourth place)

== Draw ==
Key

- Q = Qualifier
- WC = Wild card
- LL = Lucky loser
- Alt = Alternate
- ITF = ITF entry
- PR = Protected ranking
- SR = Special ranking
- SE = Special exempt
- JE = Junior exempt
- JR = Junior Accelerator Programme entrant
- CO = College Accelerator Programme entrant
- NG = Next Gen Accelerator Program entrant
- w/o = Walkover
- r = Retired
- d = Defaulted

=== Finals ===
Semifinals
1	(Netherlands) Maikel Scheffers (Netherlands) Ronald Vink	6	6
(Netherlands) Robin Ammerlaan (Sweden) Stefan Olsson	0	3
(France) Stéphane Houdet (France) Michaël Jeremiasz	6^{4}	7^{7}	6
2/WC	(Netherlands) Tom Egberink (Japan) Shingo Kunieda	7^{7}	6^{1}	4

Final
1	(Netherlands) Maikel Scheffers (Netherlands) Ronald Vink	7	6
(France) Stéphane Houdet (France) Michaël Jeremiasz	5	2
Third place
(Netherlands) Robin Ammerlaan (Sweden) Stefan Olsson	6	6
2/WC	(Netherlands) Tom Egberink (Japan) Shingo Kunieda	3	3
