= 2011 Wimbledon Championships – Boys' singles =

Boys' singles
- 2011 Wimbledon Championships

Final
- Champion: (Australia) Luke Saville
- Runner-up: (United Kingdom) Liam Broady
- Score: 2–6, 6–4, 6–2

Details
- Draw: 64 (8 Q / 8 WC )
- Seeds: 16

Events
Singles	men	women		boys	girls
Doubles	men	women	mixed	boys	girls
WC Singles	men	women	quad
WC Doubles	men	women	quad
Legends	men	women	seniors
← 2010 ·	Wimbledon Championships	· 2012 →

Luke Saville defeated Liam Broady in the final, 2–6, 6–4, 6–2, to win the boys' singles tennis title at the 2011 Wimbledon Championships.

Márton Fucsovics was the defending champion, but was no longer eligible to compete in junior events.

== Seeds ==
1. (Czech Republic) Jiří Veselý (third round)
2. (Brazil) Thiago Moura Monteiro (third round)
3. (Bolivia) Hugo Dellien (first round)
4. (United Kingdom) Oliver Golding (second round)
5. (Slovakia) Filip Horanský (third round)
6. (Spain) Roberto Carballés Baena (second round)
7. (Austria) Dominic Thiem (third round)
8. (Croatia) Mate Pavić (quarterfinals)
9. (Australia) Andrew Whittington (second round)
10. (United Kingdom) George Morgan (second round)
11. (Brazil) João Pedro Sorgi (first round)
12. (Austria) Patrick Ofner (first round)
13. (Philippines) Jeson Patrombon (second round)
14. (Spain) Andrés Artuñedo (first round)
15. (United Kingdom) Liam Broady (final)
16. (Australia) Luke Saville (champion)

Click on the seed number of a player to go to their draw section.

== Draw ==
=== Key ===
- Q = Qualifier
- WC = Wild card
- LL = Lucky loser
- Alt = Alternate
- ITF = ITF entry
- PR = Protected ranking
- SR = Special ranking
- SE = Special exempt
- JE = Junior exempt
- JR = Junior Accelerator Programme entrant
- CO = College Accelerator Programme entrant
- NG = Next Gen Accelerator Program entrant
- w/o = Walkover
- r = Retired
- d = Defaulted

=== Finals ===
Quarterfinals
15	(United Kingdom) Liam Broady	7^{7}	4	13
Q	(Germany) Robin Kern	6^{4}	6	11
WC	(Australia) Jason Kubler	6	6
(Belgium) Julien Cagnina	3	1
8	(Croatia) Mate Pavić	6	6^{7}	8
(Japan) Kaichi Uchida	4	7^{9}	10
(Belgium) Joris De Loore	7^{7}	2	2
16	(Australia) Luke Saville	6^{1}	6	6

Semifinals
15	(United Kingdom) Liam Broady	6	6
WC	(Australia) Jason Kubler	4	3
(Japan) Kaichi Uchida	4	1
16	(Australia) Luke Saville	6	6

Final
15	(United Kingdom) Liam Broady	6	4	2
16	(Australia) Luke Saville	2	6	6

=== Top half ===
==== Section 1 ====
First round
1	(Czech Republic) Jiří Veselý	6	6
WC	(United Kingdom) Jonathan Cornish	4	2
(Brazil) Bruno Sant'Anna	4	4
(United States) Alexios Halebian	6	6
(France) Mathias Bourgue	7	6
(Canada) Filip Peliwo	5	1
Q	(Australia) Nick Kyrgios	3	7^{7}	2
15	(United Kingdom) Liam Broady	6	6^{3}	6
9	(Australia) Andrew Whittington	7^{7}	6
WC	(United Kingdom) Luke Bambridge	6^{4}	3
Q	(Germany) Robin Kern	6	6
(Netherlands) Jannick Lupescu	1	2
(Belarus) Yaraslav Shyla	4	7^{7}	6
(Ukraine) Vladyslav Manafov	6	6^{5}	3
Q	(Spain) Oriol Roca Batalla	4	6^{3}
5	(Slovakia) Filip Horanský	6	7^{7}

Second round
1	(Czech Republic) J Veselý	6	6
(United States) A Halebian	4	4
(France) M Bourgue	1	4
15	(United Kingdom) L Broady	6	6
9	(Australia) A Whittington	4	4
Q	(Germany) R Kern	6	6
(Belarus) Y Shyla	4	4
5	(Slovakia) F Horanský	6	6

Third round
1	(Czech Republic) J Veselý	4	5
15	(United Kingdom) L Broady	6	7
Q	(Germany) R Kern	6	6
5	(Slovakia) F Horanský	3	1

Quarterfinals
15	(United Kingdom) L Broady	7^{7}	4	13
Q	(Germany) R Kern	6^{4}	6	11

==== Section 2 ====
First round
4	(United Kingdom) Oliver Golding	4	7^{7}	6
(Russia) Aslan Karatsev	6	6^{3}	4
WC	(Australia) Jason Kubler	4	6	10
(Croatia) Mate Delić	6	4	8
(Serbia) Peđa Krstin	6	5	6
(Mexico) Marco Aurelio Núñez	4	7	4
(United States) Marcos Giron	6	7
14	(Spain) Andrés Artuñedo	2	5
11	(Brazil) João Pedro Sorgi	3	3
(United Kingdom) Kyle Edmund	6	6
(United States) Mac Styslinger	6^{4}	3
(Belgium) Julien Cagnina	7^{7}	6
WC	(United Kingdom) Joshua Ward-Hibbert	7	6
(Moldova) Maxim Dubarenco	5	4
(Ecuador) Diego Hidalgo	2	1
7	(Austria) Dominic Thiem	6	6

Second round
4	(United Kingdom) O Golding	6^{7}	2
WC	(Australia) J Kubler	7^{9}	6
(Serbia) P Krstin	4	2
(United States) M Giron	6	6
(United Kingdom) K Edmund	6	6^{6}	4
(Belgium) J Cagnina	3	7^{8}	6
WC	(United Kingdom) J Ward-Hibbert	2	5
7	(Austria) D Thiem	6	7

Third round
WC	(Australia) J Kubler	6	6
(United States) M Giron	3	3
(Belgium) J Cagnina	6	6
7	(Austria) D Thiem	4	2

Quarterfinals
WC	(Australia) J Kubler	6	6
(Belgium) J Cagnina	3	1

=== Bottom half ===
==== Section 3 ====
First round
8	(Croatia) Mate Pavić	3	7^{7}	8
(United States) Mitchell Krueger	6	6^{5}	6
Q	(Spain) Axel Álvarez Llamas	3	4
WC	(United Kingdom) Evan Hoyt	6	6
(Chile) Matías Sborowitz	4	4
Q	(Burundi) Hassan Ndayishimiye	6	6
(Portugal) Frederico Ferreira Silva	3	6	6
12	(Austria) Patrick Ofner	6	3	2
13	(Philippines) Jeson Patrombon	2	6	6
(Germany) Julian Lenz	6	4	4
WC	(United Kingdom) Toby Martin	4	4
(Belgium) Kimmer Coppejans	6	6
(Australia) Ben Wagland	6	4	8
(United States) Shane Vinsant	3	6	6
(Japan) Kaichi Uchida	7^{7}	6
3	(Bolivia) Hugo Dellien	6^{4}	1

Second round
8	(Croatia) M Pavić	7^{7}	6
WC	(United Kingdom) E Hoyt	6^{3}	2
Q	(Burundi) H Ndayishimiye	6	5	4
(Portugal) F Ferreira Silva	4	7	6
13	(Philippines) J Patrombon	6^{1}	1
(Belgium) K Coppejans	7^{7}	6
(Australia) B Wagland	6^{3}	6	3
(Japan) K Uchida	7^{7}	4	6

Third round
8	(Croatia) M Pavić	4	6	6
(Portugal) F Ferreira Silva	6	4	3
(Belgium) K Coppejans	3	5
(Japan) K Uchida	6	7

Quarterfinals
8	(Croatia) M Pavić	6	6^{7}	8
(Japan) K Uchida	4	7^{9}	10

==== Section 4 ====
First round
6	(Spain) Roberto Carballés Baena	6	6
WC	(United Kingdom) Andrew Bettles	3	4
(Serbia) Nikola Milojević	2	4
(Belgium) Joris De Loore	6	6
(United States) Sean Berman	7^{7}	6
Q	(France) Enzo Couacaud	6^{4}	2
(Romania) Teodor Nicolae Marin	4	6	1
10	(United Kingdom) George Morgan	6	4	6
16	(Australia) Luke Saville	6	6
(Czech Republic) Lukáš Vrňák	1	2
(Russia) Evgeny Karlovskiy	7	6
Q	(United States) Dennis Novikov	5	4
(South Africa) Wayne Montgomery	4	6	5
WC	(United Kingdom) Oliver Hudson	6	3	7
Q	(Austria) Dennis Novak	3	6	13
2	(Brazil) Thiago Monteiro	6	1	15

Second round
6	(Spain) R Carballés Baena	6	4	4
(Belgium) J De Loore	1	6	6
(United States) S Berman	6	6
10	(United Kingdom) G Morgan	3	4
16	(Australia) L Saville	7	7^{9}
(Russia) E Karlovskiy	5	6^{7}
WC	(United Kingdom) O Hudson	4	6	3
2	(Brazil) T Monteiro	6	3	6

Third round
(Belgium) J De Loore	6	7^{7}
(United States) S Berman	4	6^{3}
16	(Australia) L Saville	7^{10}	6
2	(Brazil) T Monteiro	6^{8}	3

Quarterfinals
(Belgium) J De Loore	7^{7}	2	2
16	(Australia) L Saville	6^{1}	6	6
