= 2011 Wimbledon Championships – Girls' singles =

Girls' singles
- 2011 Wimbledon Championships

Final
- Champion: (Australia) Ashleigh Barty
- Runner-up: (Russia) Irina Khromacheva
- Score: 7–5, 7–6^{(7–3)}

Details
- Draw: 64 (8Q / 8WC)
- Seeds: 16

Events
Singles	men	women		boys	girls
Doubles	men	women	mixed	boys	girls
WC Singles	men	women	quad
WC Doubles	men	women	quad
Legends	men	women	seniors
- Wimbledon Championships

Ashleigh Barty defeated Irina Khromacheva in the final, 7–5, 7–6^{(7–3)} to win the girls' singles title at the 2011 Wimbledon Championships. Barty would go on to win the women's title in 2021.

Kristýna Plíšková was the defending champion, but was no longer eligible to participate in junior events.

== Seeds ==
1. (Russia) Daria Gavrilova (first round)
2. (France) Caroline Garcia (semifinals)
3. (Russia) Irina Khromacheva (final)
4. (Tunisia) Ons Jabeur (first round)
5. (Canada) Eugenie Bouchard (quarterfinals)
6. (Paraguay) Montserrat González (quarterfinals)
7. (Russia) Yulia Putintseva (quarterfinals)
8. (Argentina) Victoria Bosio (first round)
9. (Serbia) Jovana Jakšić (first round)
10. (Belgium) Alison Van Uytvanck (second round)
11. (Russia) Daria Salnikova (first round)
12. (Australia) Ashleigh Barty (champion)
13. (Estonia) Anett Kontaveit (third round)
14. (Slovakia) Viktória Maľová (first round)
15. (Czech Republic) Jesika Malečková (second round)
16. (United States) Victoria Duval (quarterfinals)

Click on the seed number of a player to go to their draw section.

== Draw ==
Key

- Q = Qualifier
- WC = Wild card
- LL = Lucky loser
- Alt = Alternate
- ITF = ITF entry
- PR = Protected ranking
- SR = Special ranking
- SE = Special exempt
- JE = Junior exempt
- JR = Junior Accelerator Programme entrant
- CO = College Accelerator Programme entrant
- NG = Next Gen Accelerator Program entrant
- w/o = Walkover
- r = Retired
- d = Defaulted

=== Finals ===
Quarterfinals
16	(United States) Victoria Duval	3	2
12	(Australia) Ashleigh Barty	6	6
(Netherlands) Indy de Vroome	6	6
7	(Russia) Yulia Putintseva	3	1
5	(Canada) Eugenie Bouchard	2	2
3	(Russia) Irina Khromacheva	6	6
6	(Paraguay) Montserrat González	1	7^{7}	6
2	(France) Caroline Garcia	6	6^{2}	8

Semifinals
12	(Australia) Ashleigh Barty	6	6
(Netherlands) Indy de Vroome	4	1
3	(Russia) Irina Khromacheva	7^{7}	3	6
2	(France) Caroline Garcia	6^{5}	6	1

Final
12	(Australia) Ashleigh Barty	7	7^{7}
3	(Russia) Irina Khromacheva	5	6^{3}

=== Top half ===
==== Section 1 ====
First round
1	(Russia) Daria Gavrilova	6^{2}	3
(Ukraine) Kateryna Kozlova	7^{7}	6
(Bulgaria) Viktoriya Tomova	4	4
(Sweden) Ellen Allgurin	6	6
Q	(Brazil) Beatriz Haddad Maia	3	6	6
WC	(United Kingdom) Laura Deigman	6	3	4
(Japan) Miyu Kato	4	6	3
16	(United States) Victoria Duval	6	4	6
12	(Australia) Ashleigh Barty	6	6
WC	(United Kingdom) Lucy Brown	3	4
(Czech Republic) Klára Fabíková	0	5
Q	(Germany) Katharina Lehnert	6	7
(Madagascar) Zarah Razafimahatratra	6	6
(Peru) Patricia Kú Flores	2	2
(United States) Madison Keys	6	6
8	(Argentina) Victoria Bosio	4	0

Second round
(Ukraine) K Kozlova	2	7	6
(Sweden) E Allgurin	6	5	2
Q	(Brazil) B Haddad Maia	1	2
16	(United States) V Duval	6	6
12	(Australia) A Barty	6	6
Q	(Germany) K Lehnert	1	2
(Madagascar) Z Razafimahatratra	2	1
(United States) M Keys	6	6

Third round
(Ukraine) K Kozlova	3	2
16	(United States) V Duval	6	6
12	(Australia) A Barty	6	6^{5}	6
(United States) M Keys	3	7^{7}	4

Quarterfinals
16	(United States) V Duval	3	2
12	(Australia) A Barty	6	6

==== Section 2 ====
First round
4/WC	(Tunisia) Ons Jabeur	6	4	3
(Japan) Risa Ozaki	4	6	6
(United States) Gabrielle Andrews	6	3	4
Q	(United Kingdom) Ruth Seaborne	2	6	6
(Ukraine) Ganna Poznikhirenko	5	6^{5}
(Netherlands) Indy de Vroome	7	7^{7}
(Belarus) Aliaksandra Sasnovich	6	6
14	(Slovakia) Viktória Maľová	2	1
9	(Serbia) Jovana Jakšić	6	3	4
(Croatia) Donna Vekić	1	6	6
(United States) Christina Makarova	7^{7}	4	4
(Czech Republic) Barbora Krejčíková	6^{2}	6	6
(Japan) Nao Hibino	6	7^{7}
WC	(United Kingdom) Katy Dunne	2	6^{5}
(Romania) Elena-Teodora Cadar	1	1
7	(Russia) Yulia Putintseva	6	6

Second round
(Japan) R Ozaki	6	3	6
Q	(United Kingdom) R Seaborne	2	6	4
(Netherlands) I de Vroome	6	6
(Belarus) A Sasnovich	2	3
(Croatia) D Vekić	6	6
(Czech Republic) B Krejčíková	2	4
(Japan) N Hibino	2	4
7	(Russia) Y Putintseva	6	6

Third round
(Japan) R Ozaki	0	1
(Netherlands) I de Vroome	6	6
(Croatia) D Vekić	6	2	3
7	(Russia) Y Putintseva	2	6	6

Quarterfinals
(Netherlands) I de Vroome	6	6
7	(Russia) Y Putintseva	3	1

=== Bottom half ===
==== Section 3 ====
First round
5	(Canada) Eugenie Bouchard	6	6
Q	(Switzerland) Mégane Bianco	4	2
(Austria) Barbara Haas	6	6
WC	(United Kingdom) Jessica Ren	0	4
(Netherlands) Demi Schuurs	2	4
(United States) Krista Hardebeck	6	6
(Japan) Miho Kowase	3	0
10	(Belgium) Alison Van Uytvanck	6	6
15	(Czech Republic) Jesika Malečková	6	6
(Slovakia) Chantal Škamlová	4	2
WC	(United Kingdom) Daneika Borthwick	6	6
(Japan) Eri Hozumi	2	2
Q	(United States) Catherine Harrison	6	7^{9}
(Ecuador) Marie Elise Casares	2	6^{7}
Q	(Germany) Stephanie Wagner	3	2
3	(Russia) Irina Khromacheva	6	6

Second round
5	(Canada) E Bouchard	6	6
(Austria) B Haas	0	3
(United States) K Hardebeck	3	6	6
10	(Belgium) A Van Uytvanck	6	3	4
15	(Czech Republic) J Malečková	2	3
WC	(United Kingdom) D Borthwick	6	6
Q	(United States) C Harrison	4	7^{8}	2
3	(Russia) I Khromacheva	6	6^{6}	6

Third round
5	(Canada) E Bouchard	6	6
(United States) K Hardebeck	3	4
WC	(United Kingdom) D Borthwick	3	2
3	(Russia) I Khromacheva	6	6

Quarterfinals
5	(Canada) E Bouchard	2	2
3	(Russia) I Khromacheva	6	6

==== Section 4 ====
First round
6	(Paraguay) Montserrat González	6	6
WC	(United Kingdom) Katie Boulter	4	2
(Ukraine) Sofiya Kovalets	7	6
(United States) Grace Min	5	4
(United Kingdom) Francesca Stephenson	6	6
(Japan) Makoto Ninomiya	4	2
(Czech Republic) Petra Rohanová	7^{8}	6
11	(Russia) Daria Salnikova	6^{6}	3
13	(Estonia) Anett Kontaveit	6	5	6
Q	(Russia) Mayya Katsitadze	2	7	4
(Romania) Cristina Dinu	4	4
(Slovakia) Lucia Butkovská	6	6
(United States) Stephanie Nauta	7^{7}	7^{8}
WC	(United Kingdom) Pippa Horn	6^{3}	6^{6}
Q	(Czech Republic) Tereza Smitková	2	4
2	(France) Caroline Garcia	6	6

Second round
6	(Paraguay) M González	6	6
(Ukraine) S Kovalets	0	2
(United Kingdom) F Stephenson	2	5
(Czech Republic) P Rohanová	6	7
13	(Estonia) A Kontaveit	6	6
(Slovakia) L Butkovská	4	1
(United States) S Nauta	2	3
2	(France) C Garcia	6	6

Third round
6	(Paraguay) M González	6	6
(Czech Republic) P Rohanová	3	3
13	(Estonia) A Kontaveit	2	7^{7}	4
2	(France) C Garcia	6	6^{5}	6

Quarterfinals
6	(Paraguay) M González	1	7^{7}	6
2	(France) C Garcia	6	6^{2}	8
