= 2011 Wimbledon Championships – Gentlemen's invitation doubles =

Gentlemen's invitation doubles
- 2011 Wimbledon Championships

Final
- Champions: (Netherlands) Jacco Eltingh (Netherlands) Paul Haarhuis
- Runners-up: (Sweden) Jonas Björkman (Australia) Todd Woodbridge
- Score: 3–6, 6–3, [13–11]

Events
| Singles | men | women | | boys | girls |
| Doubles | men | women | mixed | boys | girls |
| WC Singles | men | women | quad |
| WC Doubles | men | women | quad |
| Legends | men | women | seniors |
| ← 2010 · | Wimbledon Championships | · 2012 → |

Donald Johnson and Jared Palmer were the defending champions but were eliminated in the round robin.

Jacco Eltingh and Paul Haarhuis defeated Jonas Björkman and Todd Woodbridge in the final, 3–6, 6–3, [13–11], to win the gentlemen's invitation doubles tennis title at the 2011 Wimbledon Championships.

== Draw ==
=== Key ===
- Q = Qualifier
- WC = Wild card
- LL = Lucky loser
- Alt = Alternate
- ITF = ITF entry
- PR = Protected ranking
- SR = Special ranking
- SE = Special exempt
- JE = Junior exempt
- JR = Junior Accelerator Programme entrant
- CO = College Accelerator Programme entrant
- NG = Next Gen Accelerator Program entrant
- w/o = Walkover
- r = Retired
- d = Defaulted

=== Final ===
| Final |
| (Sweden) Jonas Björkman (Australia) Todd Woodbridge | 6 | 3 | [11] |
| (Netherlands) Jacco Eltingh (Netherlands) Paul Haarhuis | 3 | 6 | [13] |

=== Group A ===
| | (Sweden) Björkman (Australia) Woodbridge | (United Kingdom) Cowan (France) Pioline | (Croatia) Ivanišević (Netherlands) Krajicek | (United States) Johnson (United States) Palmer | RR; W–L | Set; W–L | Game; W–L | Standings |
| (Sweden) Jonas Björkman (Australia) Todd Woodbridge | | 6–3, 6–4 | 6–3, 6–4 | 3–6, 7–6^{(7–2)}, [10–4] | 3–0 | 6–1 | 35–26 | 1 |
| (United Kingdom) Barry Cowan (France) Cédric Pioline | 3–6, 4–6 | | 4–6, 4–6 | 6–3, 6–7^{(2–7)}, [4–10] | 0–3 | 1–6 | 27–35 | 4 |
| (Croatia) Goran Ivanišević (Netherlands) Richard Krajicek | 3–6, 4–6 | 6–4, 6–4 | | 5–7, 6–7^{(2–7)} | 1–2 | 2–4 | 30–34 | 3 |
| (United States) Donald Johnson (United States) Jared Palmer | 6–3, 6–7^{(2–7)}, [4–10] | 3–6, 7–6^{(7–2)}, [10–4] | 7–5, 7–6^{(7–2)} | | 2–1 | 5–3 | 37–34 | 2 |

Standings are determined by: 1. number of wins; 2. number of matches; 3. in two-players-ties, head-to-head records; 4. in three-players-ties, percentage of sets won, or of games won; 5. steering-committee decision.

=== Group B ===
| | (Netherlands) Eltingh (Netherlands) Haarhuis | (South Africa) Ferreira (Russia) Kafelnikov | (United States) Gimelstob (United States) Martin | (United Kingdom) Petchey (United Kingdom) Wilkinson | RR; W–L | Set; W–L | Game; W–L | Standings |
| (Netherlands) Jacco Eltingh (Netherlands) Paul Haarhuis | | 6–3, 3–6, [8–10] | 6–4, 7–6^{(7–2)} | 6–3, 6–4 | 2–1 | 5–2 | 34–27 | 1 |
| (South Africa) Wayne Ferreira (Russia) Yevgeny Kafelnikov | 3–6, 6–3, [10–8] | | 3–6, 6–3, [11–13] | 7–5, 6–3 | 2–1 | 5–3 | 32–27 | 2 |
| (United States) Justin Gimelstob (United States) Todd Martin | 4–6, 6–7^{(2–7)} | 6–3, 3–6, [13–11] | | 6–3, 7–6^{(7–0)} | 2–1 | 4–3 | 33–31 | 3 |
| (United Kingdom) Mark Petchey (United Kingdom) Chris Wilkinson | 3–6, 4–6 | 5–7, 3–6 | 3–6, 6–7^{(0–7)} | | 0–3 | 0–6 | 24–38 | 4 |

Standings are determined by: 1. number of wins; 2. number of matches; 3. in two-players-ties, head-to-head records; 4. in three-players-ties, percentage of sets won, or of games won; 5. steering-committee decision.
