= 2011 Wimbledon Championships – Senior gentlemen's invitation doubles =

Senior gentlemen's invitation doubles
- 2011 Wimbledon Championships

Final
- Champions: (Australia) Pat Cash (Australia) Mark Woodforde
- Runners-up: (United Kingdom) Jeremy Bates (Sweden) Anders Järryd
- Score: 6–3, 5–7, [10–5]

Events
| Singles | men | women | | boys | girls |
| Doubles | men | women | mixed | boys | girls |
| WC Singles | men | women | quad |
| WC Doubles | men | women | quad |
| Legends | men | women | seniors |
| ← 2010 · | Wimbledon Championships | · 2012 → |

Pat Cash and Mark Woodforde successfully defended their title, defeating Jeremy Bates and Anders Järryd in the final, 6–3, 5–7, [10–5] to win the senior gentlemen's invitation doubles tennis title at the 2011 Wimbledon Championships.

== Draw ==
=== Key ===
- Q = Qualifier
- WC = Wild card
- LL = Lucky loser
- Alt = Alternate
- ITF = ITF entry
- PR = Protected ranking
- SR = Special ranking
- SE = Special exempt
- JE = Junior exempt
- JR = Junior Accelerator Programme entrant
- CO = College Accelerator Programme entrant
- NG = Next Gen Accelerator Program entrant
- w/o = Walkover
- r = Retired
- d = Defaulted

=== Final ===
| Final |
| (Australia) Pat Cash (Australia) Mark Woodforde | 6 | 5 | [10] |
| (United Kingdom) Jeremy Bates (Sweden) Anders Järryd | 3 | 7 | [5] |

=== Group A ===
| | (Iran) Bahrami (United Kingdom) Castle | (Australia) Cash (Australia) Woodforde | (United States) Curren (United States) Kriek | (Australia) Cahill (Sweden) Pernfors | RR; W–L | Set; W–L | Game; W–L | Standings |
| (Iran) Mansour Bahrami (United Kingdom) Andrew Castle | | 3–6, 5–7 | 6–4, 3–6, [6–10] | w/o | 1–2 | 1–4 | 17–24 | 3 |
| (Australia) Pat Cash (Australia) Mark Woodforde | 6–3, 7–5 | | 4–6, 6–3, [10–5] | 2–1 ret. | 3–0 | 5–1 | 26–18 | 1 |
| (United States) Kevin Curren (United States) Johan Kriek | 4–6, 6–3, [10–6] | 6–4, 3–6, [5–10] | | w/o | 2–1 | 3–3 | 20–20 | 2 |
| (Australia) Darren Cahill (Sweden) Mikael Pernfors | w/o | 1–2 ret. | w/o | | 0–3 | 0–1 | 1–2 | 4 |

Standings are determined by: 1. number of wins; 2. number of matches; 3. in two-players-ties, head-to-head records; 4. in three-players-ties, percentage of sets won, or of games won; 5. steering-committee decision.

=== Group B ===
| | (India) Amritraj (Australia) Fitzgerald | (United Kingdom) Bates (Sweden) Järryd | (United States) Fleming (United States) Gilbert | (Australia) McNamara (Australia) McNamee | RR; W–L | Set; W–L | Game; W–L | Standings |
| (India) Vijay Amritraj (Australia) John Fitzgerald | | 2–6, 2–6 | 7–6^{(7–5)}, 6–7^{(4–7)}, [10–8] | 6–2, 6–2 | 2–1 | 4–3 | 30–29 | 2 |
| (United Kingdom) Jeremy Bates (Sweden) Anders Järryd | 6–2, 6–2 | | 6–4, 6–3 | 6–2, 6–4 | 3–0 | 6–0 | 36–17 | 1 |
| (United States) Peter Fleming (United States) Brad Gilbert | 6–7^{(5–7)}, 7–6^{(7–4)}, [8–10] | 4–6, 3–6 | | 6–3, 6–7^{(2–7)}, [9–11] | 0–3 | 2–6 | 32–37 | 4 |
| (Australia) Peter McNamara (Australia) Paul McNamee | 2–6, 2–6 | 2–6, 4–6 | 3–6, 7–6^{(7–2)}, [11–9] | | 1–2 | 2–5 | 21–36 | 3 |

Standings are determined by: 1. number of wins; 2. number of matches; 3. in two-players-ties, head-to-head records; 4. in three-players-ties, percentage of sets won, or of games won; 5. steering-committee decision.
