= 2011 Wimbledon Championships – Ladies' invitation doubles =

Ladies' invitation doubles
- 2011 Wimbledon Championships

Final
- Champions: (United States) Lindsay Davenport (Switzerland) Martina Hingis
- Runners-up: (United States) Martina Navratilova (Czech Republic) Jana Novotná
- Score: 6–4, 6–4

Events
Singles	men	women		boys	girls
Doubles	men	women	mixed	boys	girls
WC Singles	men	women	quad
WC Doubles	men	women	quad
Legends	men	women	seniors
← 2010 ·	Wimbledon Championships	· 2012 →

Lindsay Davenport and Martina Hingis defeated the defending champions Martina Navratilova and Jana Novotná in the final, 6–4, 6–4 to win the ladies' invitation doubles tennis title at the 2011 Wimbledon Championships.

== Draw ==
=== Key ===
- Q = Qualifier
- WC = Wild card
- LL = Lucky loser
- Alt = Alternate
- ITF = ITF entry
- PR = Protected ranking
- SR = Special ranking
- SE = Special exempt
- JE = Junior exempt
- JR = Junior Accelerator Programme entrant
- CO = College Accelerator Programme entrant
- NG = Next Gen Accelerator Program entrant
- w/o = Walkover
- r = Retired
- d = Defaulted

=== Final ===
Final
(United States) Martina Navratilova (Czech Republic) Jana Novotná	4	4
(United States) Lindsay Davenport (Switzerland) Martina Hingis	6	6

=== Group A ===
	(United Kingdom) Croft (United Kingdom) Smith	(Spain) Martínez (France) Tauziat	(United States) Navratilova (Czech Republic) Novotná	(Czech Republic) Suková (Hungary) Temesvári	RR; W–L	Set; W–L	Game; W–L	Standings
(United Kingdom) Annabel Croft (United Kingdom) Samantha Smith		0–6, 3–6	0–6, 3–6	0–6, 3–6	0–3	0–6	9–36	4
(Spain) Conchita Martínez (France) Nathalie Tauziat	6–0, 6–3		4–6, 2–6	6–2, 7–5	2–1	4–2	31–22	2
(United States) Martina Navratilova (Czech Republic) Jana Novotná	6–0, 6–3	6–4, 6–2		7–6^{(7–4)}, 6–2	3–0	6–0	37–17	1
(Czech Republic) Helena Suková (Hungary) Andrea Temesvári	6–0, 6–3	2–6, 5–7	6–7^{(4–7)}, 2–6		1–2	2–4	27–29	3

Standings are determined by: 1. number of wins; 2. number of matches; 3. in two-players-ties, head-to-head records; 4. in three-players-ties, percentage of sets won, or of games won; 5. steering-committee decision.

=== Group B ===
	(United States) Austin (United States) Rinaldi	(United States) Davenport (Switzerland) Hingis	(United States) Fernández (Belarus) Zvereva	(Bulgaria) Maleeva (Austria) Schett	RR; W–L	Set; W–L	Game; W–L	Standings
(United States) Tracy Austin (United States) Kathy Rinaldi		2–6, 3–6	3–6, 7–5, [9–11]	3–6, 4–6	0–3	1–6	22–36	4
(United States) Lindsay Davenport (Switzerland) Martina Hingis	6–2, 6–3		6–2, 6–2	6–1, 6–1	3–0	6–0	36–11	1
(United States) Gigi Fernández (Belarus) Natasha Zvereva	6–3, 5–7, [11–9]	2–6, 2–6		1–6, 1–6	1–2	2–5	18–34	3
(Bulgaria) Magdalena Maleeva (Austria) Barbara Schett	6–3, 6–4	1–6, 1–6	6–1, 6–1		2–1	4–2	26–21	2

Standings are determined by: 1. number of wins; 2. number of matches; 3. in two-players-ties, head-to-head records; 4. in three-players-ties, percentage of sets won, or of games won; 5. steering-committee decision.
