= 2011 Wimbledon Championships – Boys' doubles =

Boys' doubles
- 2011 Wimbledon Championships

Final
- Champions: (United Kingdom) George Morgan (Croatia) Mate Pavić
- Runners-up: (United Kingdom) Oliver Golding (Czech Republic) Jiří Veselý
- Score: 3–6, 6–4, 7–5

Events
Singles	men	women		boys	girls
Doubles	men	women	mixed	boys	girls
WC Singles	men	women	quad
WC Doubles	men	women	quad
Legends	men	women	seniors
← 2010 ·	Wimbledon Championships	· 2012 →

Liam Broady and Tom Farquharson were the defending champions but Farquharson was no longer eligible to compete as a Junior. Broady competed with Filip Horanský and lost in the semifinals to George Morgan and Mate Pavić.

Morgan and Pavić defeated Oliver Golding and Jiří Veselý in the final, 3–6, 6–4, 7–5 to win the boys' doubles tennis title at the 2011 Wimbledon Championships.

== Seeds ==
1. (United Kingdom) Oliver Golding / (Czech Republic) Jiří Veselý (final)
2. (United Kingdom) George Morgan / (Croatia) Mate Pavić (champions)
3. (Spain) Andrés Artuñedo / (Spain) Roberto Carballés Baena (semifinals)
4. (United Kingdom) Liam Broady / (Slovakia) Filip Horanský (semifinals)
5. (Brazil) Thiago Monteiro / (Brazil) Bruno Sant'Anna (first round)
6. (Bolivia) Hugo Dellien / (Ecuador) Diego Hidalgo (second round)
7. (Australia) Luke Saville / (Brazil) João Pedro Sorgi (first round)
8. (Croatia) Mate Delić / (Austria) Dominic Thiem (first round)

== Draw ==
=== Key ===
- Q = Qualifier
- WC = Wild card
- LL = Lucky loser
- Alt = Alternate
- SE = Special exempt
- PR = Protected ranking
- ITF = ITF entry
- JE = Junior exempt
- w/o = Walkover
- r = Retired
- d = Defaulted
- SR = Special ranking

=== Finals ===
Semifinals
1	(United Kingdom) Oliver Golding (Czech Republic) Jiří Veselý	7	7^{7}
3	(Spain) Andrés Artuñedo (Spain) Roberto Carballés Baena	5	6^{5}
4	(United Kingdom) Liam Broady (Slovakia) Filip Horanský	3	6^{2}
2	(United Kingdom) George Morgan (Croatia) Mate Pavić	6	7^{7}

Final
1	(United Kingdom) Oliver Golding (Czech Republic) Jiří Veselý	6	4	5
2	(United Kingdom) George Morgan (Croatia) Mate Pavić	3	6	7

=== Top half ===
First round
1	(United Kingdom) Oliver Golding (Czech Republic) Jiří Veselý	7	6
WC	(United Kingdom) Andrew Bettles (United Kingdom) Toby Martin	5	3
(United States) Marcos Giron (United States) Alexios Halebian	4	7^{7}
(Germany) Robin Kern (Germany) Julian Lenz	6	7^{9}
(Belgium) Kimmer Coppejans (Canada) Filip Peliwo	4	2
(Belgium) Julien Cagnina (Belgium) Joris De Loore	6	6
(Moldova) Maxim Dubarenco (Ukraine) Vladyslav Manafov	7^{7}	6^{4}	6
7	(Australia) Luke Saville (Brazil) João Pedro Sorgi	6^{1}	7^{7}	1
3	(Spain) Andrés Artuñedo (Spain) Roberto Carballés Baena	6	6^{3}	6
(United States) Mitchell Krueger (United States) Shane Vinsant	0	7^{7}	2
(France) Mathias Bourgue (France) Enzo Couacaud	1	1
(Austria) Dennis Novak (Czech Republic) Lukáš Vrňák	6	6
WC	(United Kingdom) Sam Hutt (United Kingdom) Joshua Ward-Hibbert	4	7	6
(Russia) Aslan Karatsev (Russia) Evgeny Karlovskiy	6	5	3
(Serbia) Peđa Krstin (Netherlands) Jannick Lupescu	2	6^{5}
6	(Bolivia) Hugo Dellien (Ecuador) Diego Hidalgo	6	7^{7}

Second round
1	(United Kingdom) O Golding (Czech Republic) J Veselý	6	6
(Germany) R Kern (Germany) J Lenz	3	3
(Belgium) J Cagnina (Belgium) J De Loore	3	6^{6}
(Moldova) M Dubarenco (Ukraine) V Manafov	6	7^{8}
3	(Spain) A Artuñedo (Spain) R Carballés Baena	6	6
(Austria) D Novak (Czech Republic) L Vrňák	4	1
WC	(United Kingdom) S Hutt (United Kingdom) J Ward-Hibbert	6	7^{7}
6	(Bolivia) H Dellien (Ecuador) D Hidalgo	3	6^{5}

Quarterfinals
1	(United Kingdom) O Golding (Czech Republic) J Veselý	7^{7}	6
(Moldova) M Dubarenco (Ukraine) V Manafov	6^{5}	3
3	(Spain) A Artuñedo (Spain) R Carballés Baena	6	6
WC	(United Kingdom) S Hutt (United Kingdom) J Ward-Hibbert	3	2

Semifinals
1	(United Kingdom) O Golding (Czech Republic) J Veselý	7	7^{7}
3	(Spain) A Artuñedo (Spain) R Carballés Baena	5	6^{5}

=== Bottom half ===
First round
5	(Brazil) Thiago Monteiro (Brazil) Bruno Sant'Anna	4	7	9
WC	(United Kingdom) Luke Bambridge (United Kingdom) Kyle Edmund	6	5	11
(New Zealand) Jaden Grinter (Philippines) Jeson Patrombon	3	7^{7}	3
(Australia) Ben Wagland (Australia) Andrew Whittington	6	6^{5}	6
(United States) Connor Farren (United States) Mac Styslinger	6	6
Alt	(Burundi) Hassan Ndayishimiye (Chile) Benjamin Ugarte	1	4
(United States) Dennis Novikov (Japan) Kaichi Uchida	6	4	1
4	(United Kingdom) Liam Broady (Slovakia) Filip Horanský	4	6	6
8	(Croatia) Mate Delić (Austria) Dominic Thiem	4	6^{1}
(Spain) Axel Álvarez Llamas (Spain) Oriol Roca Batalla	6	7^{7}
(Mexico) Marco Aurelio Núñez (Belarus) Yaraslav Shyla	7^{7}	4	6
WC	(United Kingdom) Jonathan Cornish (United Kingdom) Evan Hoyt	6^{3}	6	4
(Chile) Matías Sborowitz (Portugal) Frederico Ferreira Silva	6^{3}	4
(Sweden) Stefan Lindmark (Serbia) Nikola Milojević	7^{7}	6
(United States) Sean Berman (Australia) Nick Kyrgios	7^{7}	1	4
2	(United Kingdom) George Morgan (Croatia) Mate Pavić	6^{1}	6	6

Second round
WC	(United Kingdom) L Bambridge (United Kingdom) K Edmund	5	2
(Australia) B Wagland (Australia) A Whittington	7	6
(United States) C Farren (United States) M Styslinger	2	6	4
4	(United Kingdom) L Broady (Slovakia) F Horanský	6	3	6
(Spain) A Álvarez Llamas (Spain) O Roca Batalla	7^{7}	7
(Mexico) MA Núñez (Belarus) Y Shyla	6^{3}	5
(Sweden) S Lindmark (Serbia) N Milojević	6^{7}	6^{5}
2	(United Kingdom) G Morgan (Croatia) M Pavić	7^{9}	7^{7}

Quarterfinals
(Australia) B Wagland (Australia) A Whittington	3	3
4	(United Kingdom) L Broady (Slovakia) F Horanský	6	6
(Spain) A Álvarez Llamas (Spain) O Roca Batalla	4	2
2	(United Kingdom) G Morgan (Croatia) M Pavić	6	6

Semifinals
4	(United Kingdom) L Broady (Slovakia) F Horanský	3	6^{2}
2	(United Kingdom) G Morgan (Croatia) M Pavić	6	7^{7}
