= 2011 Wimbledon Championships – Mixed doubles =

Mixed doubles
- 2011 Wimbledon Championships

Final
- Champions: (Austria) Jürgen Melzer (Czech Republic) Iveta Benešová
- Runners-up: (India) Mahesh Bhupathi (Russia) Elena Vesnina
- Score: 6–3, 6–2

Details
- Draw: 48 (5 WC )
- Seeds: 16

Events
Singles	men	women		boys	girls
Doubles	men	women	mixed	boys	girls
WC Singles	men	women	quad
WC Doubles	men	women	quad
Legends	men	women	seniors
← 2010 ·	Wimbledon Championships	· 2012 →

Leander Paes and Cara Black were the defending champions but lost in the quarterfinals to Daniel Nestor and Chan Yung-jan.

Jürgen Melzer and Iveta Benešová defeated Mahesh Bhupathi and Elena Vesnina in the final, 6–3, 6–2 to win the mixed doubles tennis title at the 2011 Wimbledon Championships.

== Seeds ==
All seeds received a bye into the second round.

1. (United States) Bob Bryan / (United States) Liezel Huber (quarterfinals, withdrew)
2. (Belarus) Max Mirnyi / (Kazakhstan) Yaroslava Shvedova (second round)
3. (Serbia) Nenad Zimonjić / (Slovenia) Katarina Srebotnik (third round, withdrew)
4. (India) Mahesh Bhupathi / (Russia) Elena Vesnina (final)
5. (Pakistan) Aisam-ul-Haq Qureshi / (Czech Republic) Květa Peschke (second round)
6. (India) Rohan Bopanna / (India) Sania Mirza (quarterfinals)
7. (Germany) Philipp Petzschner / (Czech Republic) Barbora Záhlavová-Strýcová (second round)
8. (Canada) Daniel Nestor / (Chinese Taipei) Chan Yung-jan (semifinals)
9. (Austria) Jürgen Melzer / (Czech Republic) Iveta Benešová (champions)
10. (Belgium) Dick Norman / (United States) Lisa Raymond (second round)
11. (The Bahamas) Mark Knowles / (Russia) Nadia Petrova (third round)
12. (Italy) Daniele Bracciali / (Italy) Flavia Pennetta (withdrew)
13. (Czech Republic) František Čermák / (Czech Republic) Lucie Hradecká (second round)
14. (India) Leander Paes / (Zimbabwe) Cara Black (quarterfinals)
15. (Israel) Andy Ram / (United States) Meghann Shaughnessy (third round)
16. (Spain) David Marrero / (Czech Republic) Andrea Hlaváčková (second round)

Click on the seed number of a player to go to their draw section.

== Draw ==
=== Key ===
- Q = Qualifier
- WC = Wild card
- LL = Lucky loser
- Alt = Alternate
- SE = Special exempt
- PR = Protected ranking
- ITF = ITF entry
- JE = Junior exempt
- w/o = Walkover
- r = Retired
- d = Defaulted
- SR = Special ranking

=== Finals ===
Quarterfinals
1	(United States) Bob Bryan (United States) Liezel Huber	w/o
9	(Austria) Jürgen Melzer (Czech Republic) Iveta Benešová
14	(India) Leander Paes (Zimbabwe) Cara Black	3	2
8	(Canada) Daniel Nestor (Chinese Taipei) Chan Yung-jan	6	6
(Israel) Jonathan Erlich (Israel) Shahar Pe'er	4	1
4	(India) Mahesh Bhupathi (Russia) Elena Vesnina	6	6
6	(India) Rohan Bopanna (India) Sania Mirza	6	2	2
(Australia) Paul Hanley (Chinese Taipei) Hsieh Su-wei	1	6	6

Semifinals
9	(Austria) Jürgen Melzer (Czech Republic) Iveta Benešová	6	6
8	(Canada) Daniel Nestor (Chinese Taipei) Chan Yung-jan	4	4
4	(India) Mahesh Bhupathi (Russia) Elena Vesnina	6	3	7
(Australia) Paul Hanley (Chinese Taipei) Hsieh Su-wei	2	6	5

Final
9	(Austria) Jürgen Melzer (Czech Republic) Iveta Benešová	6	6
4	(India) Mahesh Bhupathi (Russia) Elena Vesnina	3	2

=== Top half ===
==== Section 1 ====
First round
(Germany) C Kas (Chinese Taipei) C-j Chuang	4	7	4
(United States) S Lipsky (Australia) C Dellacqua	6	5	6
(Spain) F López (Germany) A Petkovic	6	6
(Curaçao) J-J Rojer (United States) A Spears	3	4
WC	(United Kingdom) J Marray (United Kingdom) A Keothavong	6	4	6
(Italy) A Seppi (Italy) A Brianti	3	6	8
(United States) R Ram (Romania) A Dulgheru	6	6
(Mexico) S González (Canada) R Marino	3	4

Second round
1	(United States) B Bryan (United States) L Huber	6	6
(United States) S Lipsky (Australia) C Dellacqua	4	1
(Spain) F López (Germany) A Petkovic	7^{7}	6
16	(Spain) D Marrero (Czech Republic) A Hlaváčková	6^{2}	4
9	(Austria) J Melzer (Czech Republic) I Benešová	6	6
(Italy) A Seppi (Italy) A Brianti	4	3
(United States) R Ram (Romania) A Dulgheru	6	7
7	(Germany) P Petzschner (Czech Republic) B Záhlavová-Strýcová	2	5

Third round
1	(United States) B Bryan (United States) L Huber	6	6
(Spain) F López (Germany) A Petkovic	4	4
9	(Austria) J Melzer (Czech Republic) I Benešová	6	6
(United States) R Ram (Romania) A Dulgheru	4	3

Quarterfinals
1	(United States) B Bryan (United States) L Huber	w/o
9	(Austria) J Melzer (Czech Republic) I Benešová

==== Section 2 ====
First round
WC	(United Kingdom) R Hutchins (United Kingdom) H Watson	6^{5}	6	8
(Brazil) M Melo (Australia) R Stubbs	7^{7}	3	6
Alt	(Netherlands) R Wassen (Poland) A Rosolska	1
(South Africa) W Moodie (United States) R Kops-Jones	2^{r}
WC	(United Kingdom) J Delgado (United Kingdom) M South	6	0
Alt	(Argentina) C Berlocq (Russia) M Kondratieva	2	0^{r}
(Australia) A Fisher (South Africa) N Grandin	6	6
(Poland) M Matkowski (Poland) K Jans	4	2

Second round
3	(Serbia) N Zimonjić (Slovenia) K Srebotnik	6	6
WC	(United Kingdom) R Hutchins (United Kingdom) H Watson	4	4
Alt	(Netherlands) R Wassen (Poland) A Rosolska	1	4
14	(India) L Paes (Zimbabwe) C Black	6	6
11	(The Bahamas) M Knowles (Russia) N Petrova	7	6
WC	(United Kingdom) J Delgado (United Kingdom) M South	5	4
(Australia) A Fisher (South Africa) N Grandin	2	3
8	(Canada) D Nestor (Chinese Taipei) Y-j Chan	6	6

Third round
3	(Serbia) N Zimonjić (Slovenia) K Srebotnik	w/o
14	(India) L Paes (Zimbabwe) C Black
11	(The Bahamas) M Knowles (Russia) N Petrova	6^{6}	2
8	(Canada) D Nestor (Chinese Taipei) Y-j Chan	7^{8}	6

Quarterfinals
14	(India) L Paes (Zimbabwe) C Black	3	2
8	(Canada) D Nestor (Chinese Taipei) Y-j Chan	6	6

=== Bottom half ===
==== Section 3 ====
First round
(Slovakia) I Zelenay (Czech Republic) V Uhlířová	3	6^{1}
(Israel) J Erlich (Israel) S Pe'er	6	7^{7}
(Spain) M López (Spain) A Parra Santonja	6^{10}	6	4
WC	(United Kingdom) C Fleming (United Kingdom) J Rae	7^{12}	1	6
(United States) M Bryan (Australia) S Stosur	4	6	3
(United States) E Butorac (Belarus) O Govortsova	6	3	6
(Australia) S Huss (Australia) A Rodionova	3	7^{7}	7
(Germany) A Waske (Germany) J Wöhr	6	6^{3}	5

Second round
5	(Pakistan) A-u-H Qureshi (Czech Republic) K Peschke	3	1
(Israel) J Erlich (Israel) S Pe'er	6	6
WC	(United Kingdom) C Fleming (United Kingdom) J Rae	6	3	6
10	(Belgium) D Norman (United States) L Raymond	4	6	4
13	(Czech Republic) F Čermák (Czech Republic) L Hradecká	2	1
(United States) E Butorac (Belarus) O Govortsova	6	6
(Australia) S Huss (Australia) A Rodionova	2	6^{3}
4	(India) M Bhupathi (Russia) E Vesnina	6	7^{7}

Third round
(Israel) J Erlich (Israel) S Pe'er	6	7
WC	(United Kingdom) C Fleming (United Kingdom) J Rae	4	5
(United States) E Butorac (Belarus) O Govortsova	2	6^{7}
4	(India) M Bhupathi (Russia) E Vesnina	6	7^{9}

Quarterfinals
(Israel) J Erlich (Israel) S Pe'er	4	1
4	(India) M Bhupathi (Russia) E Vesnina	6	6

==== Section 4 ====
First round
(Russia) I Andreev (Russia) M Kirilenko	6^{6}	3
(United Kingdom) J Murray (Australia) J Gajdošová	7^{8}	6
(Brazil) B Soares (Russia) E Makarova	4	4
(Argentina) E Schwank (Russia) A Kudryavtseva	6	6
(Germany) D Brown (United States) V King	6^{6}	6	4
WC	(United Kingdom) K Skupski (United Kingdom) E Baltacha	7^{8}	4	6
(Australia) P Hanley (Chinese Taipei) S-w Hsieh	6	6
(Colombia) JS Cabal (Slovenia) P Hercog	1	2

Second round
6	(India) R Bopanna (India) S Mirza	7^{7}	6
(United Kingdom) J Murray (Australia) J Gajdošová	6^{5}	2
(Argentina) E Schwank (Russia) A Kudryavtseva	7^{7}	6^{5}	3
Alt	(Czech Republic) M Damm (Czech Republic) R Voráčová	6^{3}	7^{7}	6
15	(Israel) A Ram (United States) M Shaughnessy	6	6
WC	(United Kingdom) K Skupski (United Kingdom) E Baltacha	4	4
(Australia) P Hanley (Chinese Taipei) S-w Hsieh	6	5	6
2	(Belarus) M Mirnyi (Kazakhstan) Y Shvedova	4	7	4

Third round
6	(India) R Bopanna (India) S Mirza	6	6
Alt	(Czech Republic) M Damm (Czech Republic) R Voráčová	3	0
15	(Israel) A Ram (United States) M Shaughnessy	6^{4}	6^{3}
(Australia) P Hanley (Chinese Taipei) S-w Hsieh	7^{7}	7^{7}

Quarterfinals
6	(India) R Bopanna (India) S Mirza	6	2	2
(Australia) P Hanley (Chinese Taipei) S-w Hsieh	1	6	6
