= 2011 Petra Kvitová tennis season =

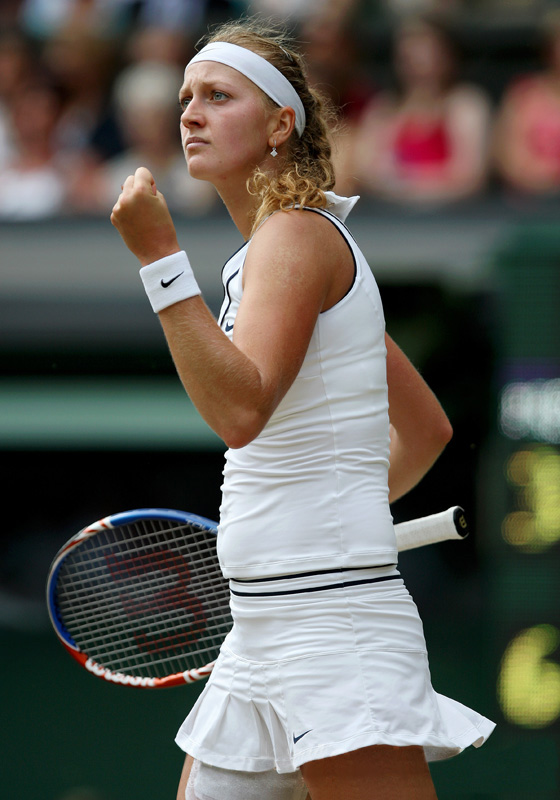
- Petra Kvitová won her first Grand Slam title at the 2011 Wimbledon Championships
- Full name: Petra Kvitová
- Country: Czech Republic

Singles
- Season record: 60-13 (82.19%)
- Calendar titles: 6
- Current ranking: No. 2
- Year-end ranking: No. 2
- Ranking change from previous year: ▲32

Grand Slam & significant results
- Australian Open: QF
- French Open: 4R
- Wimbledon: W
- US Open: 1R
- Tour Finals: W

The 2011 Petra Kvitová tennis season officially began at the 2011 Brisbane International, the first of two simultaneous events which opened the official 2011 season.

== Yearly summary ==
=== Australian Open series ===
Kvitová began her season at the 2011 Brisbane International, as an unseeded player. She upset third seed Nadia Petrova in the first round, then followed it up with wins over Ksenia Pervak, Dominika Cibulková and Anastasia Pavlyuchenkova to reach her first final since 2009, where she faced Andrea Petkovic of Germany. Kvitová won in straight sets to win only her second career title and first in almost two years.

As a result of reaching the final in Brisbane, Kvitová had to withdraw from the qualifying draw for the Medibank International Sydney.

Kvitová's next tournament was the 2011 Australian Open, where she was the 25th seed. She defeated Sally Peers, Anna Chakvetadze, fifth seed Samantha Stosur and Flavia Pennetta, the latter in three sets, to reach the quarter-finals of the Australian Open for the first time. There, she lost to World No. 2 Vera Zvonareva in straight sets. Following the run in Australia, Kvitová entered the world's top 20 for the first time.

=== Fed Cup quarter-finals ===
Following the Australian Open, Kvitová was named in the Czech Republic Fed Cup team for its quarter-final against Slovakia. Kvitová won both of her rubbers against Dominika Cibulková and Daniela Hantuchová; her victory over the latter ensured the Czech Republic would progress through to the semi-finals.

=== Indoor/Middle East series ===
Following the Fed Cup quarter-finals, Kvitová participated at the 2011 Open GDF Suez, where she was seeded fourth. After surviving three-setters against fellow Czech Barbora Záhlavová-Strýcová and Yanina Wickmayer in earlier rounds, she reached the final, upsetting soon-to-be World No. 1 Kim Clijsters in straight sets to win her second title for the year.

Kvitová then made an early exit from her next tournament, losing in the first round of the 2011 Dubai Tennis Championships to Ayumi Morita of Japan.

=== American hard court season ===
The next stop for Kvitová following the Middle East swing was the Premier Mandatory Indian Wells tournament in March. After receiving a bye in the opening round, Kvitová was upset by fellow Czech Barbora Záhlavová-Strýcová, whom she had beaten in Paris the previous month, in the second round.

Kvitová then received a wildcard into the Bahamas Women's Open, but she was upset in the first round by Kristina Barrois in three sets, marking a third consecutive defeat.

The Sony Ericsson Open saw somewhat of a brief return to form for Kvitová; after receiving a first round bye, she defeated Varvara Lepchenko for her first match victory in almost six weeks, but was then upset in three sets by Anastasia Pavlyuchenkova in the third round.

=== Fed Cup semi-finals ===
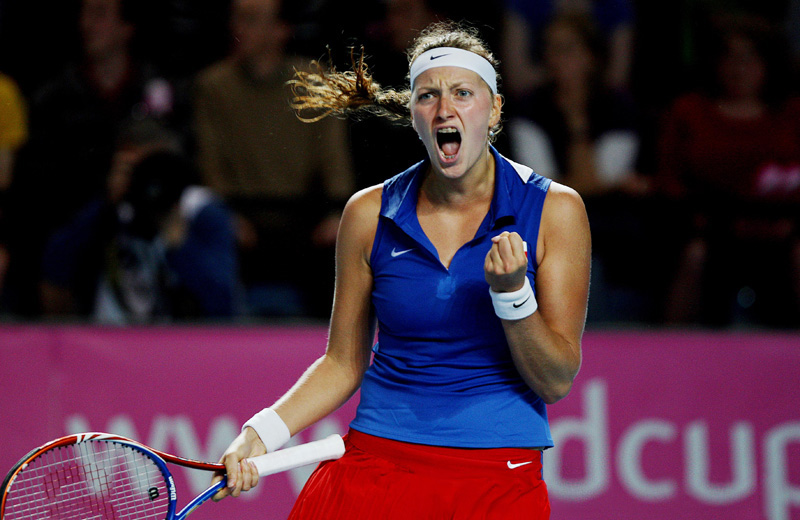
Petra Kvitová was instrumental in winning the Czech Republic their sixth Fed Cup title in 2011.

Following her disappointing North American hard court season, Kvitová next represented the Czech Republic in its semi-final against Belgium. Kvitová won both of her singles rubbers against Kirsten Flipkens and Yanina Wickmayer, as the Czechs progressed to the final.

=== Clay court season ===
Kvitová kicked off her clay court season at the Mutua Madrid Open, where she was seeded 16th. After defeating Alexandra Dulgheru and Chanelle Scheepers in the first two rounds, she defeated second seed Vera Zvonareva in straight sets in the Round of 16 to progress to the quarter-finals. She then went on to defeat Dominika Cibulková (who had upset Maria Sharapova and Svetlana Kuznetsova in earlier rounds) and Li Na to reach her third final for the year, where she would meet Victoria Azarenka. In the final, Kvitová survived a first set tiebreak and went on to win in straight sets, claiming her first career Tier I/Premier Mandatory title in the process. By winning this title, Kvitová entered the Top 10 for the first time in her career.

Rather than participate in Rome, Kvitová decided to travel home to participate at her home ITF event, the Sparta Prague Open. Seeded first, Kvitová reached her fourth final of the year, but would end up losing to Slovak Magdaléna Rybáriková. During the tournament, she suffered a hip injury, which would force her to withdraw from the Brussels Open the following week.

Kvitová's next tournament was the 2011 French Open, where she was seeded ninth. She defeated Gréta Arn, Zheng Jie and Vania King to reach the fourth round, where she was defeated by the eventual champion, Li Na, in three sets, having led by a break in the final set.

=== Grass court season ===
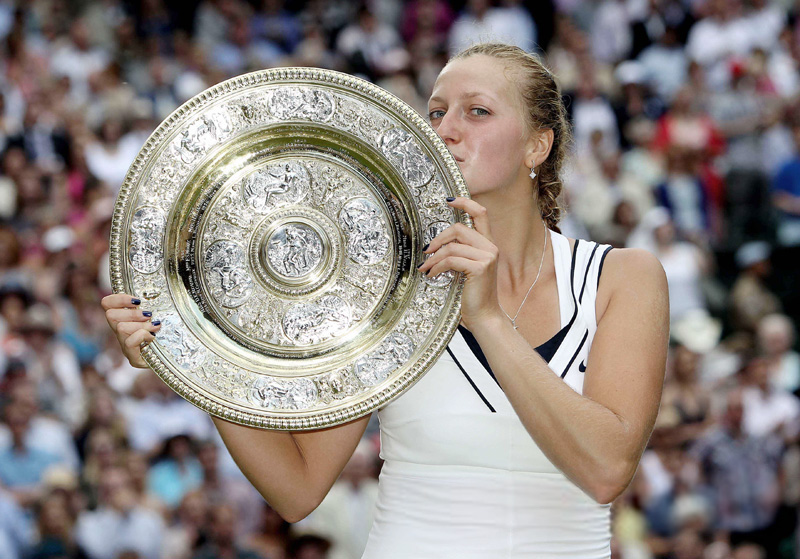
Kvitová holds the Venus Rosewater Dish

Following a modest clay court campaign, Kvitová made the transition to grass by participating in the AEGON International event in Eastbourne. She defeated Anastasija Sevastova, Ekaterina Makarova, Agnieszka Radwańska and Daniela Hantuchová (the latter retiring) to reach the final, but found Marion Bartoli too good for her in the championship match, losing in three sets.

Wimbledon was next for Kvitová, where she had reached the semi-finals in 2010. Intent on going one better, Kvitová won her first four matches without conceding more than three games in a single set, before surviving three-set thrillers against Tsvetana Pironkova and Victoria Azarenka, to reach her first Grand Slam final. There, she met Maria Sharapova, who was seen as a favourite to win her second title after previously triumphing in 2004. However, Kvitová would win in straight sets to win her first Grand Slam title at the expense of the Russian.

=== US Open series ===
Kvitová's form dropped off following her successful grass court campaign. She suffered a pair of losses to Andrea Petkovic in Toronto and Cincinnati (both in the third round and both after receiving a first round bye), then became the first reigning Wimbledon champion to lose in the first round of the US Open when she lost her first match to Alexandra Dulgheru. She finished the US Open series with a paltry 2–3 win-loss record from five matches.

=== Asian hard court season ===
Following her unsuccessful US Open series campaign, Kvitová rebounded at the Toray Pan Pacific Open in Tokyo, defeating Mandy Minella, Vania King and Maria Sharapova (retired) before losing to Vera Zvonareva in the semi-finals.

Kvitová then received a first round bye at the China Open, but was defeated in her first match by Sofia Arvidsson of Sweden. That would be the last time that Kvitová was beaten in 2011.

=== Indoor hard court season ===
Following the Asian hard court swing, Kvitová received a wildcard into the Generali Ladies Linz, thus making her the top seed. With the exception of her semi-final victory over Jelena Janković, Kvitová won all of her matches in straight sets, including in the final, where she defeated Dominika Cibulková to win her fifth title of the year.

=== WTA Tour Championships ===
As a result of Kvitová's excellent results this year, she qualified for the 2011 WTA Tour Championships for the first time in her career. She drew Vera Zvonareva, Caroline Wozniacki and Agnieszka Radwańska in her group in the round robin stage. She went through this stage without dropping a set, thus qualifying for the semi-finals. She then defeated Samantha Stosur in three sets to advance to the final, where she would meet Victoria Azarenka for the third time in the year. Kvitová would win in three sets, to claim her sixth title of the year, go through the entire championships undefeated and become the first woman since Maria Sharapova in 2004 to win the title on her first attempt.

=== Fed Cup final ===
To round out the season, Kvitová took part in the Czech Republic's Fed Cup championship match against Russia. She won both of her singles rubbers, against Maria Kirilenko and Svetlana Kuznetsova, as the Czechs claimed their sixth Fed Cup title. Her two singles rubbers saw her finish 2011 on a twelve-match winning streak, which she would unofficially (Note: Kvitová participated at the 2012 Hopman Cup, where she won all four of her singles ties, which do not count towards WTA records, so therefore, her "official" longest match-winning streak is fourteen.) extend to eighteen in the early part of 2012.

== All matches ==
=== Singles matches ===
Tournament	Match	Round	Opponent	Result	Score
Brisbane International; Brisbane, Australia; WTA International; Hard, outdoor 2–8 January 2011
Brisbane International; Brisbane, Australia; WTA International; Hard, outdoor 2–8 January 2011	1	1R	(Russia) Nadia Petrova	Win	7–6^{(7–3)}, 6–3
Brisbane International; Brisbane, Australia; WTA International; Hard, outdoor 2–8 January 2011	2	2R	(Russia) Ksenia Pervak	Win	1–6, 6–4, 6–2
Brisbane International; Brisbane, Australia; WTA International; Hard, outdoor 2–8 January 2011	3	QF	(Slovakia) Dominika Cibulková	Win	6–0, 6–4
Brisbane International; Brisbane, Australia; WTA International; Hard, outdoor 2–8 January 2011	4	SF	(Russia) Anastasia Pavlyuchenkova	Win	6–4, 4–6, 6–2
Brisbane International; Brisbane, Australia; WTA International; Hard, outdoor 2–8 January 2011	5	W	(Germany) Andrea Petkovic	Win (1)	6–1, 6–3
Australian Open; Melbourne, Australia; Grand Slam; Hard, outdoor 17–30 January 2011
Australian Open; Melbourne, Australia; Grand Slam; Hard, outdoor 17–30 January 2011	6	1R	(Australia) Sally Peers	Win	6–2, 6–4
Australian Open; Melbourne, Australia; Grand Slam; Hard, outdoor 17–30 January 2011	7	2R	(Russia) Anna Chakvetadze	Win	6–3, 6–4
Australian Open; Melbourne, Australia; Grand Slam; Hard, outdoor 17–30 January 2011	8	3R	(Australia) Samantha Stosur	Win	7–6^{(7–5)}, 6–3
Australian Open; Melbourne, Australia; Grand Slam; Hard, outdoor 17–30 January 2011	9	4R	(Italy) Flavia Pennetta	Win	3–6, 6–3, 6–3
Australian Open; Melbourne, Australia; Grand Slam; Hard, outdoor 17–30 January 2011	10	QF	(Russia) Vera Zvonareva	Loss	6–2, 6–4
Fed Cup WG 1st Round; Bratislava, Slovakia; Hard, indoor 5–6 February 2011	11	1R; R2	(Slovakia) Dominika Cibulková	Win	6–2, 6–3
Fed Cup WG 1st Round; Bratislava, Slovakia; Hard, indoor 5–6 February 2011	12	1R; R3	(Slovakia) Daniela Hantuchová	Win	6–4, 6–2
Open GDF Suez; Paris, France; WTA Premier; Hard, outdoor 7–13 February 2011
Open GDF Suez; Paris, France; WTA Premier; Hard, outdoor 7–13 February 2011	13	1R	(Russia) Vesna Manasieva	Win	7–5, 6–4
Open GDF Suez; Paris, France; WTA Premier; Hard, outdoor 7–13 February 2011	14	2R	(Czech Republic) Barbora Záhlavová-Strýcová	Win	6–4, 6–7^{(6–8)}, 7–6^{(11–9)}
Open GDF Suez; Paris, France; WTA Premier; Hard, outdoor 7–13 February 2011	15	QF	(Belgium) Yanina Wickmayer	Win	5–7, 6–3, 7–6^{(7–3)}
Open GDF Suez; Paris, France; WTA Premier; Hard, outdoor 7–13 February 2011	16	SF	(United States) Bethanie Mattek-Sands	Win	6–2, 6–0
Open GDF Suez; Paris, France; WTA Premier; Hard, outdoor 7–13 February 2011	17	W	(Belgium) Kim Clijsters	Win (2)	6–4, 6–3
Dubai Tennis Championships; Dubai, United Arab Emirates; WTA Premier; Hard, outdoor 14–20 February 2011	18	1R	(Japan) Ayumi Morita	Loss	6–7^{(2–7)}, 6–7^{(3–7)}
Indian Wells; Indian Wells, United States of America; WTA Premier Mandatory; Hard, outdoor 7–20 March 2011		1R	Bye		
Indian Wells; Indian Wells, United States of America; WTA Premier Mandatory; Hard, outdoor 7–20 March 2011	19	2R	(Czech Republic) Barbora Záhlavová-Strýcová	Loss	6–3, 2–6, 5–7
The Bahamas Women's Open; Nassau, Bahamas; ITF Circuit ($100,000); Hard, outdoor 14–20 March 2011	20	1R	(Germany) Kristina Barrois	Loss	6–1, 5–7, 3–6
Sony Ericsson Open; Miami, United States of America; WTA Premier Mandatory; Hard, outdoor 21 March–3 April 2011		1R	Bye		
Sony Ericsson Open; Miami, United States of America; WTA Premier Mandatory; Hard, outdoor 21 March–3 April 2011	21	2R	(United States) Varvara Lepchenko	Win	6–1, 6–2
Sony Ericsson Open; Miami, United States of America; WTA Premier Mandatory; Hard, outdoor 21 March–3 April 2011	22	3R	(Russia) Anastasia Pavlyuchenkova	Loss	4–6, 7–6^{(7–3)}, 0–6
Fed Cup WG Semifinals; Charleroi, Belgium; Hard, indoor 16–17 April 2011	23	SF; R1	(Belgium) Kirsten Flipkens	Win	6–2, 7–6^{(7–4)}
Fed Cup WG Semifinals; Charleroi, Belgium; Hard, indoor 16–17 April 2011	24	SF; R3	(Belgium) Yanina Wickmayer	Win	5–7, 6–4, 6–2
Mutua Madrid Open; Madrid, Spain; WTA Premier Mandatory; Clay, outdoor 2–8 May 2011	25	1R	(Romania) Alexandra Dulgheru	Win	6–4, 6–1
Mutua Madrid Open; Madrid, Spain; WTA Premier Mandatory; Clay, outdoor 2–8 May 2011	26	2R	(South Africa) Chanelle Scheepers	Win	6–3, 6–3
Mutua Madrid Open; Madrid, Spain; WTA Premier Mandatory; Clay, outdoor 2–8 May 2011	27	3R	(Russia) Vera Zvonareva	Win	6–1, 6–4
Mutua Madrid Open; Madrid, Spain; WTA Premier Mandatory; Clay, outdoor 2–8 May 2011	28	QF	(Slovakia) Dominika Cibulková	Win	3–6, 6–3, 7–5
Mutua Madrid Open; Madrid, Spain; WTA Premier Mandatory; Clay, outdoor 2–8 May 2011	29	SF	(China) Li Na	Win	6–3, 6–1
Mutua Madrid Open; Madrid, Spain; WTA Premier Mandatory; Clay, outdoor 2–8 May 2011	30	W	(Belarus) Victoria Azarenka	Win (3)	7–6^{(7–3)}, 6–4
Sparta Prague Open; Prague, Czech Republic; ITF Circuit ($100,000); Clay, outdoor 9–15 May 2011	31	1R	(United Kingdom) Anne Keothavong	Win	7–6^{(7–1)}, 6–3
Sparta Prague Open; Prague, Czech Republic; ITF Circuit ($100,000); Clay, outdoor 9–15 May 2011	32	2R	(United Kingdom) Elena Baltacha	Win	6–2, 6–3
Sparta Prague Open; Prague, Czech Republic; ITF Circuit ($100,000); Clay, outdoor 9–15 May 2011	33	QF	(France) Mathilde Johansson	Win	6–1, 6–1
Sparta Prague Open; Prague, Czech Republic; ITF Circuit ($100,000); Clay, outdoor 9–15 May 2011	34	SF	(Serbia) Aleksandra Krunić	Win	6–4, 6–2
Sparta Prague Open; Prague, Czech Republic; ITF Circuit ($100,000); Clay, outdoor 9–15 May 2011	35	F	(Slovakia) Magdaléna Rybáriková	Loss	3–6, 4–6
French Open; Paris, France; Grand Slam; Clay, outdoor 22 May–5 June 2011	36	1R	(Hungary) Gréta Arn	Win	6–2, 6–1
French Open; Paris, France; Grand Slam; Clay, outdoor 22 May–5 June 2011	37	2R	(China) Zheng Jie	Win	6–4, 6–1
French Open; Paris, France; Grand Slam; Clay, outdoor 22 May–5 June 2011	38	3R	(United States) Vania King	Win	6–4, 6–2
French Open; Paris, France; Grand Slam; Clay, outdoor 22 May–5 June 2011	39	4R	(China) Li Na	Loss	6–2, 1–6, 3–6
AEGON International; Eastbourne, United Kingdom; WTA Premier; Grass, outdoor 13–19 June 2011	40	1R	(Latvia) Anastasija Sevastova	Win	5–7, 6–1, 6–3
AEGON International; Eastbourne, United Kingdom; WTA Premier; Grass, outdoor 13–19 June 2011	41	2R	(Russia) Ekaterina Makarova	Win	7–6^{(10–8)}, 7–6^{(7–4)}
AEGON International; Eastbourne, United Kingdom; WTA Premier; Grass, outdoor 13–19 June 2011	42	QF	(Poland) Agnieszka Radwańska	Win	1–6, 6–2, 7–6^{(7–2)}
AEGON International; Eastbourne, United Kingdom; WTA Premier; Grass, outdoor 13–19 June 2011	43	SF	(Slovakia) Daniela Hantuchová	Win	7–6^{(11–9)}, 4–2 ret.
AEGON International; Eastbourne, United Kingdom; WTA Premier; Grass, outdoor 13–19 June 2011	44	F	(France) Marion Bartoli	Loss	1–6, 6–4, 5–7
The Championships, Wimbledon; London, Great Britain; Grand Slam; Grass, outdoor 20 June–3 July 2011	45	1R	(United States) Alexa Glatch	Win	6–2, 6–2
The Championships, Wimbledon; London, Great Britain; Grand Slam; Grass, outdoor 20 June–3 July 2011	46	2R	(United Kingdom) Anne Keothavong	Win	6–2, 6–1
The Championships, Wimbledon; London, Great Britain; Grand Slam; Grass, outdoor 20 June–3 July 2011	47	3R	(Italy) Roberta Vinci	Win	6–3, 6–3
The Championships, Wimbledon; London, Great Britain; Grand Slam; Grass, outdoor 20 June–3 July 2011	48	4R	(Belgium) Yanina Wickmayer	Win	6–0, 6–2
The Championships, Wimbledon; London, Great Britain; Grand Slam; Grass, outdoor 20 June–3 July 2011	49	QF	(Bulgaria) Tsvetana Pironkova	Win	6–3, 6–7^{(5–7)}, 6–2
The Championships, Wimbledon; London, Great Britain; Grand Slam; Grass, outdoor 20 June–3 July 2011	50	SF	(Belarus) Victoria Azarenka	Win	6–1, 3–6, 6–2
The Championships, Wimbledon; London, Great Britain; Grand Slam; Grass, outdoor 20 June–3 July 2011	51	W	(Russia) Maria Sharapova	Win (4)	6–3, 6–4
Rogers Cup; Toronto, Canada; WTA Premier 5 Hard, outdoor 8–14 August 2011		1R	Bye		
Rogers Cup; Toronto, Canada; WTA Premier 5 Hard, outdoor 8–14 August 2011	52	2R	(Spain) Anabel Medina Garrigues	Win	7–6^{(7–3)}, 6–3
Rogers Cup; Toronto, Canada; WTA Premier 5 Hard, outdoor 8–14 August 2011	53	3R	(Germany) Andrea Petkovic	Loss	1–6, 2–6
Western & Southern Open; Cincinnati, United States of America; WTA Premier 5 Hard, outdoor 15–21 August 2011		1R	Bye		
Western & Southern Open; Cincinnati, United States of America; WTA Premier 5 Hard, outdoor 15–21 August 2011	54	2R	(South Africa) Chanelle Scheepers	Win	7–6^{(7–3)}, 6–3
Western & Southern Open; Cincinnati, United States of America; WTA Premier 5 Hard, outdoor 15–21 August 2011	55	3R	(Germany) Andrea Petkovic	Loss	3–6, 3–6
US Open; New York City, United States of America; Grand Slam; Hard, outdoor 29 August–12 September 2011	56	1R	(Romania) Alexandra Dulgheru	Loss	6–7^{(3–7)}, 3–6
Toray Pan Pacific Open; Tokyo, Japan; WTA Premier 5 Hard, outdoor 26 September–1 October 2011		1R	Bye		
Toray Pan Pacific Open; Tokyo, Japan; WTA Premier 5 Hard, outdoor 26 September–1 October 2011	57	2R	(Luxembourg) Mandy Minella	Win	6–2, 6–3
Toray Pan Pacific Open; Tokyo, Japan; WTA Premier 5 Hard, outdoor 26 September–1 October 2011	58	3R	(United States) Vania King	Win	6–1, 7–6^{(7–4)}
Toray Pan Pacific Open; Tokyo, Japan; WTA Premier 5 Hard, outdoor 26 September–1 October 2011	59	QF	(Russia) Maria Sharapova	Win	4–3 ret.
Toray Pan Pacific Open; Tokyo, Japan; WTA Premier 5 Hard, outdoor 26 September–1 October 2011	60	SF	(Russia) Vera Zvonareva	Loss	6–7^{(2–7)}, 0–6
China Open; Beijing, China; WTA Premier Mandatory; Hard, outdoor 1–9 October 2011		1R	Bye		
China Open; Beijing, China; WTA Premier Mandatory; Hard, outdoor 1–9 October 2011	61	2R	(Sweden) Sofia Arvidsson	Loss	6–7^{(6–8)}, 6–4, 3–6
Generali Ladies Linz; Linz, Austria; WTA International; Hard, indoor 10–16 October 2011
Generali Ladies Linz; Linz, Austria; WTA International; Hard, indoor 10–16 October 2011	62	1R	(Canada) Rebecca Marino	Win	6–2, 6–2
Generali Ladies Linz; Linz, Austria; WTA International; Hard, indoor 10–16 October 2011	63	2R	(Austria) Patricia Mayr-Achleitner	Win	6–2, 6–3
Generali Ladies Linz; Linz, Austria; WTA International; Hard, indoor 10–16 October 2011	64	QF	(Slovakia) Daniela Hantuchová	Win	6–2, 6–2
Generali Ladies Linz; Linz, Austria; WTA International; Hard, indoor 10–16 October 2011	65	SF	(Serbia) Jelena Janković	Win	4–6, 6–4, 6–3
Generali Ladies Linz; Linz, Austria; WTA International; Hard, indoor 10–16 October 2011	66	W	(Slovakia) Dominika Cibulková	Win (5)	6–4, 6–1
WTA Tour Championships; Istanbul, Turkey; WTA Tour Championships; Hard, indoor 24–30 October 2011
WTA Tour Championships; Istanbul, Turkey; WTA Tour Championships; Hard, indoor 24–30 October 2011	67	RR	(Russia) Vera Zvonareva	Win	6–2, 6–4
WTA Tour Championships; Istanbul, Turkey; WTA Tour Championships; Hard, indoor 24–30 October 2011	68	RR	(Poland) Agnieszka Radwańska	Win	7–6^{(7–4)}, 6–3
WTA Tour Championships; Istanbul, Turkey; WTA Tour Championships; Hard, indoor 24–30 October 2011	69	RR	(Denmark) Caroline Wozniacki	Win	6–4, 6–2
WTA Tour Championships; Istanbul, Turkey; WTA Tour Championships; Hard, indoor 24–30 October 2011	70	SF	(Australia) Samantha Stosur	Win	5–7, 6–3, 6–3
WTA Tour Championships; Istanbul, Turkey; WTA Tour Championships; Hard, indoor 24–30 October 2011	71	W	(Belarus) Victoria Azarenka	Win (6)	7–5, 4–6, 6–3
Fed Cup Final; Moscow, Russia; Hard, indoor 4–6 November 2011	72	F R1	(Russia) Maria Kirilenko	Win	6–2, 6–2
Fed Cup Final; Moscow, Russia; Hard, indoor 4–6 November 2011	73	F R3	(Russia) Svetlana Kuznetsova	Win	4–6, 6–2, 6–3

== Tournament schedule ==
=== Singles schedule ===
Date	Championship	Location	Category	Surface	Prev. result	New result	Outcome
2 January 2011– 8 January 2011	Brisbane International	Brisbane (AUS)	WTA International	Hard	DNP	W	Won in the final against Andrea Petkovic
17 January 2011– 30 January 2011	Australian Open	Melbourne (AUS)	Grand Slam	Hard	2R	QF	Lost in the quarter-finals against Vera Zvonareva
5 February 2011– 6 February 2011	Fed Cup first round	Bratislava (SVK)	Fed Cup	Hard (i)	N/A	N/A	Czech Republic progressed to semi-finals (against Belgium)
7 February 2011– 13 February 2011	Open GDF Suez	Paris (FRA)	WTA Premier	Hard (i)	DNP	W	Won in the final against Kim Clijsters
14 February 2011– 21 February 2011	Dubai Tennis Championships	Dubai (UAE)	WTA Premier	Hard	DNP	1R	Lost in the first round against Ayumi Morita
7 March 2011– 20 March 2011	BNP Paribas Open	Indian Wells (USA)	WTA Premier Mandatory	Hard	2R	2R	Lost in the second round against Barbora Záhlavová-Strýcová
14 March 2011– 20 March 2011	The Bahamas Women's Open	Nassau (BAH)	ITF Women's Circuit ($100,000)	Hard	DNP	1R	Lost in the first round against Kristina Barrois
21 March 2011– 2 April 2011	Sony Ericsson Open	Miami (USA)	WTA Premier Mandatory	Hard	2R	3R	Lost in the third round against Anastasia Pavlyuchenkova
16 April 2011– 17 April 2011	Fed Cup semi-finals	Charleroi (BEL)	Fed Cup	Hard (i)	N/A	N/A	Czech Republic progressed to final (against Russia)
2 May 2011– 8 May 2011	Mutua Madrid Open	Madrid (ESP)	WTA Premier Mandatory	Clay	1R	W	Won in the final against Victoria Azarenka
9 May 2011– 15 May 2011	Sparta Prague Open	Prague (CZE)	ITF Women's Circuit ($100,000)	Clay	DNP	F	Lost in the final against Magdaléna Rybáriková
22 May 2011– 5 June 2011	French Open	Paris (FRA)	Grand Slam	Clay	1R	4R	Lost in the fourth round against Li Na
13 June 2011– 19 June 2011	AEGON International	Eastbourne (GBR)	WTA Premier	Grass	DNP	F	Lost in the final against Marion Bartoli
20 June 2011– 3 July 2011	Wimbledon	London (GBR)	Grand Slam	Grass	SF	W	Won in the final against Maria Sharapova
8 August 2011– 14 August 2011	Rogers Cup	Toronto (CAN)	WTA Premier 5	Hard	1R	3R	Lost in the third round against Andrea Petkovic
15 August 2011– 21 August 2011	Western & Southern Open	Cincinnati (USA)	WTA Premier 5	Hard	DNP	3R	Lost in the third round against Andrea Petkovic
29 August 2011– 12 September 2011	US Open	New York (USA)	Grand Slam	Hard	3R	1R	Lost in the first round against Alexandra Dulgheru
26 September 2011– 1 October 2011	Toray Pan Pacific Open	Tokyo (JPN)	WTA Premier 5	Hard	1R	SF	Lost in the semi-finals against Vera Zvonareva
1 October 2011– 9 October 2011	China Open	Beijing (CHN)	WTA Premier Mandatory	Hard	3R	2R	Lost in the second round against Sofia Arvidsson
10 October 2011– 16 October 2011	Generali Ladies Linz	Linz (AUT)	WTA International	Hard (i)	2R	W	Won in the final against Dominika Cibulková
24 October 2011– 30 October 2011	WTA Tour Championships	Istanbul (TUR)	WTA Tour Championships	Hard (i)	DNQ	W	Won in the final against Victoria Azarenka
4 November 2011– 6 November 2011	Fed Cup final	Moscow (RUS)	Fed Cup	Hard (i)	N/A	N/A	Czech Republic crowned 2011 Fed Cup champions

== Yearly Records ==
=== Head-to-head match-ups ===
Ordered by percentage, number of victories to number of losses, then in alphabetical order

- (Slovakia) Dominika Cibulková 4–0
- (Belarus) Victoria Azarenka 3–0
- (Slovakia) Daniela Hantuchová 3–0
- (Belgium) Yanina Wickmayer 3–0
- (United Kingdom) Anne Keothavong 2–0
- (United States) Vania King 2–0
- (Poland) Agnieszka Radwańska 2–0
- (South Africa) Chanelle Scheepers 2–0
- (Russia) Maria Sharapova 2–0
- (Australia) Samantha Stosur 2–0
- (Russia) Vera Zvonareva 2–2
- (Romania) Alexandra Dulgheru 1–1
- (China) Li Na 1–1
- (Russia) Anastasia Pavlyuchenkova 1–1
- (Czech Republic) Barbora Záhlavová-Strýcová 1–1
- (Hungary) Gréta Arn 1–0
- (United Kingdom) Elena Baltacha 1–0
- (Russia) Anna Chakvetadze 1–0
- (Belgium) Kim Clijsters 1–0
- (Belgium) Kirsten Flipkens 1–0
- (United States) Alexa Glatch 1–0
- (Serbia) Jelena Janković 1–0
- (China) Zheng Jie 1–0
- (France) Mathilde Johansson 1–0
- (Russia) Maria Kirilenko 1–0
- (Serbia) Aleksandra Krunić 1–0
- (Russia) Svetlana Kuznetsova 1–0
- (United States) Varvara Lepchenko 1–0
- (Russia) Ekaterina Makarova 1–0
- (Russia) Vesna Manasieva 1–0
- (Canada) Rebecca Marino 1–0
- (United States) Bethanie Mattek-Sands 1–0
- (Austria) Patricia Mayr-Achleitner 1–0
- (Spain) Anabel Medina Garrigues 1–0
- (Luxembourg) Mandy Minella 1–0
- (Australia) Sally Peers 1–0
- (Italy) Flavia Pennetta 1–0
- (Russia) Ksenia Pervak 1–0
- (Russia) Nadia Petrova 1–0
- (Latvia) Anastasija Sevastova 1–0
- (Bulgaria) Tsvetana Pironkova 1–0
- (Italy) Roberta Vinci 1–0
- (Denmark) Caroline Wozniacki 1–0
- (Germany) Andrea Petkovic 1–2
- (Sweden) Sofia Arvidsson 0–1
- (Germany) Kristina Barrois 0–1
- (France) Marion Bartoli 0–1
- (Japan) Ayumi Morita 0–1
- (Slovakia) Magdaléna Rybáriková 0–1

=== Finals ===
==== Singles: 8 (6–2) ====
Category Grand Slam (1–0) WTA Tour Championships (1–0) WTA Premier Mandatory (1–0) WTA Premier (1–1) WTA International (2–0) ITF Circuit ($100,000) (0–1)	Titles by surface Hard (4–0) Clay (1–1) Grass (1–1)	Titles by conditions Outdoors (3–2) Indoors (3–0)

=== Head-to-head matchups ===
Surface	Win–loss	Win%
Hard	36–10	82.35%
Clay	13–2	84.21%
Grass	11–1	91.67%
Overall	60–13	82.14%

Outcome	No.	Date	Championship	Surface	Opponent in the final	Score in the final
Winner	2.	January 8, 2011	Brisbane International, Brisbane, Australia	Hard	(Germany) Andrea Petkovic	6–1, 6–3
Winner	3.	February 13, 2011	Open GDF Suez, Paris, France	Hard (i)	(Belgium) Kim Clijsters	6–4, 6–3
Winner	4.	May 8, 2011	Mutua Madrid Open, Madrid, Spain	Clay	(Belarus) Victoria Azarenka	7–6^{(7–3)}, 6–4
Runner-up	2.	May 15, 2011	Sparta Prague Open, Prague, Czech Republic	Clay	(Slovakia) Magdaléna Rybáriková	3–6, 4–6
Runner-up	3.	June 19, 2011	Aegon International, Eastbourne, United Kingdom	Grass	(France) Marion Bartoli	3–6, 4–6
Winner	5.	July 2, 2011	Wimbledon Championships, London, United Kingdom	Grass	(Russia) Maria Sharapova	6–3, 6–4
Winner	6.	October 16, 2011	Generali Ladies Linz, Linz, Austria	Hard (i)	(Slovakia) Dominika Cibulková	6–4, 6–1
Winner	7.	October 30, 2011	WTA Tour Championships, Istanbul, Turkey	Hard (i)	(Belarus) Victoria Azarenka	7–5, 4–6, 6–3

==== Team competitions: 1 (1–0) ====
Outcome	No.	Date	Tournament	Surface	Team	Opponents in the final	Score
Winner	6.	November 4–6, 2011	Fed Cup, Moscow, Russia	Hard (i)	(Czech Republic) Lucie Hradecká (Czech Republic) Květa Peschke (Czech Republic) Lucie Šafářová	(Russia) Maria Kirilenko (Russia) Svetlana Kuznetsova (Russia) Anastasia Pavlyuchenkova (Russia) Elena Vesnina	3–2

== Awards ==
- 2011 ITF World Champion
- 2011 WTA Most Improved Player

== See also ==
- 2011 Serena Williams tennis season
- 2011 WTA Tour
