= 2011 Serena Williams tennis season =

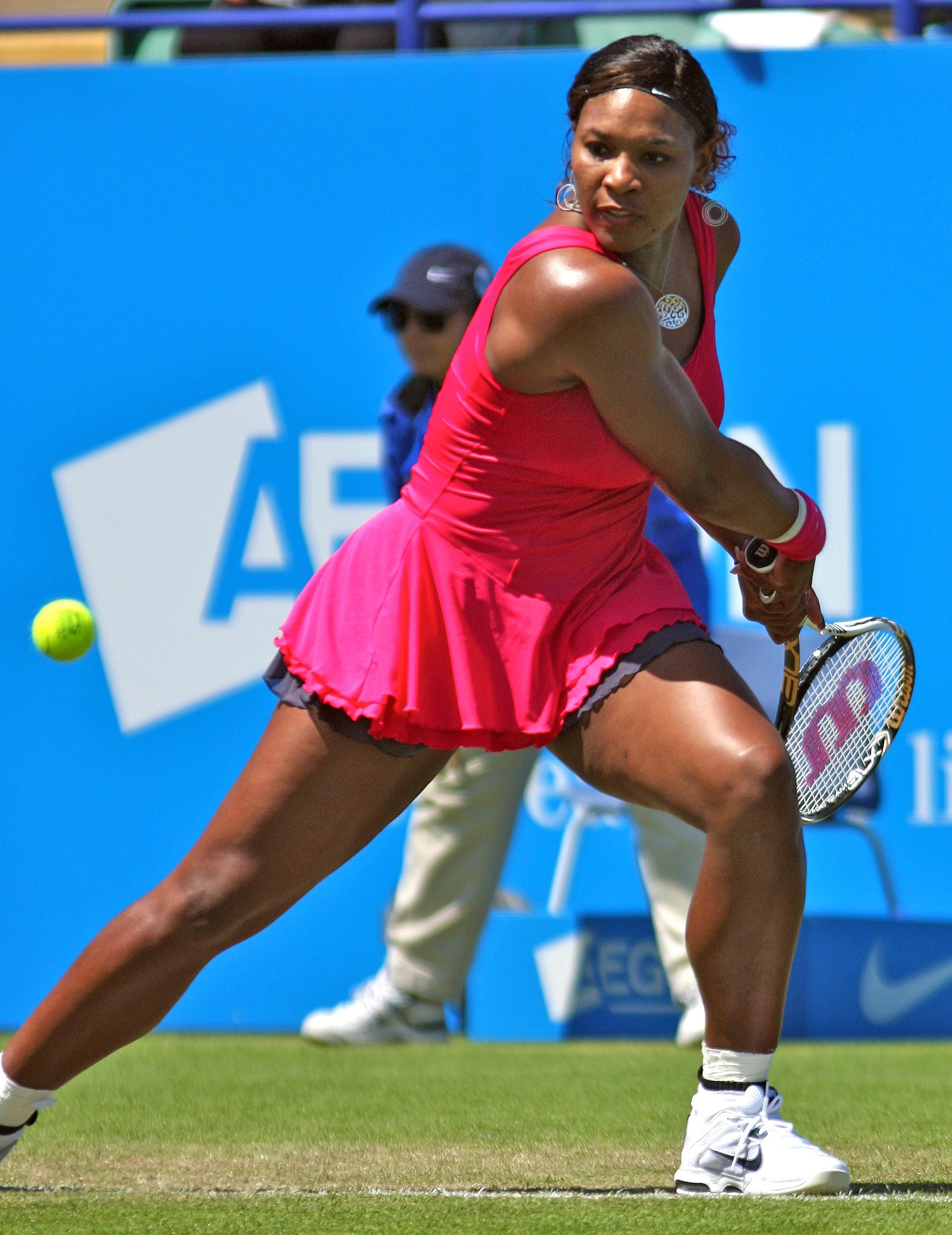
- Serena Williams at the Aegon International
- Full name: Serena Jameka Williams
- Country: United States
- Calendar prize money: $1,978,930

Singles
- Season record: 22–3 (88%)
- Calendar titles: 2
- Year-end ranking: 12
- Ranking change from previous year: ▼8

Grand Slam & significant results
- Australian Open: A
- French Open: A
- Wimbledon: 4R
- US Open: F

Serena Williams's 2011 tennis season officially began at the 2011 Aegon International after missing the first half of the year due to a pulmonary embolism.

== Year in detail ==
=== Early hard court and clay court Season ===
Because of her continuing rehabilitation for her foot injury, Serena withdrew from the Hopman Cup and the Australian Open. On March 2, 2011, she confirmed that she had suffered a hematoma and a pulmonary embolism, which caused her to miss the entire clay court season including the French Open.

=== Grass court season and Wimbledon ===
==== Aegon International ====
She made her first appearance on the WTA tour in almost a year at the 2011 Aegon International in Eastbourne. In her first round match she faced 2010 Wimbledon semifinalist Tsvetana Pironkova. Williams' struggled with unforced errors in the first set losing it winning just a game. However, Williams' hang-on to win the next two sets with a break advantage in each, closing it out with her seventh ace of the match. In the second round, she face Russian and the woman she beat for the 2010 Wimbledon title, Vera Zvonareva. Williams took the a set and serve for the match, until the Russian came back and win it in a tie-break . In the third set it saw Williams' save three match point when Zvonareva was serving for the match in the tenth game and broke back, however Williams was quickly broken and lost the match 7–5 in the third. The match lasted 3 hours and 12 minutes and it was Williams' only second loss to Zvonareva.

==== Wimbledon Championships ====
Williams' is coming into Wimbledon as the two-time defending champion. She was ranked 25th but was given a special seeding of 7th by the Wimbledon council. In the first round, she faced Aravane Rezaï, the Frenchwoman took early initiative taking the first two games, however Williams came back by winning the next five games and eventually winning the set in the ninth game. In the second set, Williams gave the break advantage to Rezaï when she double faulted at the sixth game of the second set to give the break, where Rezaï was able to close it out. Once again Williams came back and won the final set with ease losing only a game. At the end of the match Williams had an emotional outburst and was in tears. In the next round she faced Romanian Simona Halep, Halep took the first initiative by breaking in the fourth game, and continued to hold to take the first set. Williams then came back taking an early break in the second and broke to take the second set. In the third set, the American took the first five gamed of the set and three match points when she let her concentration slip and lost the next seven points, before closing it out 6–1 to advance to the third round. After the match, controversy arose as Williams' stated that she and sister was placed on court 2, with Nadal and Djokovic never being placed outside the Center Court and Court 1, despite her and Venus having won more Wimbledon than the previous two. She then faced Maria Kirilenko and got her first straight set win since her comeback, she broke in the second game and won the first set, she then won the match in the next set. Her fourth round opponents was 2007 Wimbledon finalist Marion Bartoli, Williams' was broken in the sixth game and was pushed to save three set points in her serving game at the 8th game. Bartoli the serve for the set in the ninth game and saved 3 break points to take the set. In the second set, it came on serve until Serena was broken at the 11th game. With the Frenchwoman serving for the match, the American saved three match points and broke at the second opportunity in the game to force it to a tie-break. In the tie-break, Williams saved a fourth match point with an ace but Bartoli eventually won the tie-break 8–6. The loss ended her 17 match winning streak at the event and dropping her to 175 in the world from 25th, her worst ranking since 3 November 1997, when she was 304th.

=== US Open Series and US Open ===
==== Bank of the West Classic ====
In Williams' first match in the US since her controversial loss in the 2009 US Open semifinal to Kim Clijsters, Williams' faced Russian born Australian Anastasia Rodionova in the first round and won with a double bagel in just 47 minutes. In her next match she faced Russian Maria Kirilenko, she won the first set convincingly, but in the second set she took a medical timeout to get her left ankle re-taped after a blister formed, as Kirilenko took advantage and won the second set, however Williams came back and took the final and deciding set, winning 5 of the last 6 games. She then faced second seed Maria Sharapova in the quarterfinals and won easily to earn her 6th straight victory against the Russian with her last loss coming in 2004. Williams' continues her great form with a straight set win over Wimbledon semifinalist and German Sabine Lisicki, to advance to her first final in 2011, and her first since winning the 2010 Wimbledon Championships. In the final she faced Marion Bartoli, the one that beat her at the 4th round of Wimbledon. Bartoli got an early lead in the first breaking in the third game, but Williams broke back in the eight game, just to get broken in the next game. Bartoli served for the set at 5–4, but failed to do so as Serena took the next 8 games. Williams' finally took it 6–1 in the second set, to take her first title since her comeback and made her ranking rise from 169 to the top 80.

==== Rogers Cup ====
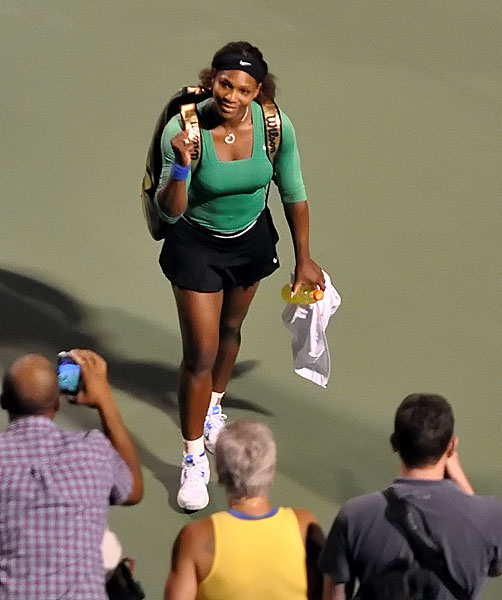
Williams claimed her biggest title of 2011 at the Rogers Cup.

Williams then headed to the Rogers Cup in Toronto. In the first round she faced Ukraine's Alona Bondarenko. Williams sweep through the first set winning it in a bagel in just 16 minutes. The second set was tougher, but Williams came through. In the second round, Williams took on German Julia Görges and like her first round sweep through the first set. The second set went on serve and was forced to be decided in a tie-break with Williams winning it 9–7 on her fifth match point. In the next round, she faced Zheng Jie, which was a contrary to her previous matches as Williams lost the opening set. However, the American was able to fire back winning the final two sets at three in a match that took 2 hours and 14 minutes. In the quarterfinals, she run into Lucie Šafářová, in which she was stretched as well coming back from a set down in just over two hours. In the semifinals, Williams faced Victoria Azarenka. Williams broke in the sixth game but was broken immediately back, however the American broke again and close out the set with an ace. In the second set Azarenka double faulted to hand the first break in the seventh game which Williams capitalized on by taking second set in the ninth game and the match. In the final, the American took on Australia's Samantha Stosur. The first set went on serve until Williams broke in the 9th game with a blistering backhand and closed the set. In the second set Williams broke Stosur twice closed it out with her 9th ace of the match. This is Williams' 38th career title

==== Western & Southern Open ====
Following her 2 consecutive tournaments wins, Williams competed in Cincinnati and faced Czech Lucie Hradecká in the first round. Williams took an early lead in the match winning the first set and led 5–1 in the second. However, her Czech opponent came back and pushed the second set to a tie-break, which Williams won. In the second round Williams was supposed to face Samantha Stosur but withdrew before the match due to a toe injury.

==== US Open ====
Williams came into the US Open as a protected ranking where she is a favorite having won 2 warm-up events and being in a 12-match winning streak. Williams began her Us Open campaign against Bojana Jovanovski and came up with a convincing double breadstick win in just 56 minutes. In the second round, Williams took on Michaëlla Krajicek and dominated the first set with a bagel in just 23 minutes. The second set was also one sided with Williams taking it to advance to the third round.< In the next round, the American face Belarus' Victoria Azarenka. Williams continued her form winning the first 5 games before Azarenka could get a game. Williams closed it out on serve/ In the second set Williams broke in the 7th game and served for the match in the tenth game but was broken. The second set went into a tie-break with Williams winning it. In the fourth round, Williams faced former world no. 1 Ana Ivanovic. Williams took the first three games but Ivanovic got the next two games. Williams then broke at the 8th game and served out the set. Williams then closed out the second set with a single break to advance. She then faced Anastasia Pavlyuchenkova in the quarterfinals. The first set began with six breaks in a row then followed by 5 straight holds of serve, before Williams got the ultimate break at the 12th game of the set to win it. Williams then took command winning the first three games of the second set before the Russian could net a game. Williams closed out the match winning the second set at one. Williams then faced the World no. 1 Caroline Wozniacki in the semifinals, where she took the first set with two breaks, where it saw Williams hitting 15 winners to Wozniacki's 0. In the second set Williams broke in the fourth game, Williams then served for the match at the ninth game but double faulted at break point, but broke the next game to advance to her first Slam final since winning 2010 Wimbledon. In the final she faced Samantha Stosur and was a heavy favorite to win the title. However, Stosur took a commanding first set win, 6–2. The second set faced controversy, as when Williams a break point down in the first game, Williams hit a forehand and shouted, "Come on!" as Stosur reached down for a backhand. Chair umpire Eva Asderaki ruled that Williams hindered Stosur's ability to complete the point and awarded it to Stosur. Stosur then strolled through the match and won the second set 6–3, ending Williams 18 match winning streak in the process.

== All matches ==
=== Singles matches ===
Tournament	Match	Round	Opponent	Rank	Result	Score
Aegon International; Eastbourne, United Kingdom; WTA Premier; Grass; 13–19 June 2011	576	1R	(Bulgaria) Tsvetana Pironkova	#34	Win	1–6, 6–3, 6–4
Aegon International; Eastbourne, United Kingdom; WTA Premier; Grass; 13–19 June 2011	577	2R	(Russia) Vera Zvonareva	#3	Loss	6–3, 6–7^{(5–7)}, 5–7
Wimbledon Championships; London, Great Britain; Grand Slam; Grass, outdoor 20 June - 3 July 2011	578	1R	(France) Aravane Rezaï	#61	Win	6–3, 3–6, 6–1
Wimbledon Championships; London, Great Britain; Grand Slam; Grass, outdoor 20 June - 3 July 2011	579	2R	(Romania) Simona Halep	#58	Win	3–6, 6–2, 6–1
Wimbledon Championships; London, Great Britain; Grand Slam; Grass, outdoor 20 June - 3 July 2011	580	3R	(Russia) Maria Kirilenko	#27	Win	6–3, 6–2
Wimbledon Championships; London, Great Britain; Grand Slam; Grass, outdoor 20 June - 3 July 2011	581	4R	(France) Marion Bartoli	#9	Loss	3–6, 6–7^{(6–8)}
Bank of the West Classic; Stanford, United States; WTA Premier; Hard, outdoor 25–31 July 2011	582	1R	(Australia) Anastasia Rodionova	#105	Win	6–0, 6–0
Bank of the West Classic; Stanford, United States; WTA Premier; Hard, outdoor 25–31 July 2011	583	2R	(Russia) Maria Kirilenko	#25	Win	6–2, 3–6, 6–2
Bank of the West Classic; Stanford, United States; WTA Premier; Hard, outdoor 25–31 July 2011	584	QF	(Russia) Maria Sharapova	#5	Win	6–1, 6–3
Bank of the West Classic; Stanford, United States; WTA Premier; Hard, outdoor 25–31 July 2011	585	SF	(Germany) Sabine Lisicki	#26	Win	6–1, 6–2
Bank of the West Classic; Stanford, United States; WTA Premier; Hard, outdoor 25–31 July 2011	586	F	(France) Marion Bartoli	#9	Win	7–5, 6–1
Rogers Cup; Toronto, Canada; WTA Premier 5 Hard, outdoor 8–14 August 2011	587	1R	(Ukraine) Alona Bondarenko	#126	Win	6–0, 6–3
Rogers Cup; Toronto, Canada; WTA Premier 5 Hard, outdoor 8–14 August 2011	588	2R	(Germany) Julia Görges	#20	Win	6–1, 7–6^{(9-7)}
Rogers Cup; Toronto, Canada; WTA Premier 5 Hard, outdoor 8–14 August 2011	589	3R	(China) Zheng Jie	#72	Win	4–6, 6–3, 6–3
Rogers Cup; Toronto, Canada; WTA Premier 5 Hard, outdoor 8–14 August 2011	590	QF	(Czech Republic) Lucie Šafářová	#32	Win	4–6, 6–3, 6–2
Rogers Cup; Toronto, Canada; WTA Premier 5 Hard, outdoor 8–14 August 2011	591	SF	(Belarus) Victoria Azarenka	#4	Win	6–3, 6–3
Rogers Cup; Toronto, Canada; WTA Premier 5 Hard, outdoor 8–14 August 2011	592	F	(Australia) Samantha Stosur	#11	Win	6–4, 6–2
Western & Southern Financial Group Masters; Cincinnati, United States; WTA Premier 5 Hard, outdoor 15–21 August 2011	593	1R	(Czech Republic) Lucie Hradecká	#49	Win	6–3, 7–6^{(7–5)}
Western & Southern Financial Group Masters; Cincinnati, United States; WTA Premier 5 Hard, outdoor 15–21 August 2011	-	2R	(Australia) Samantha Stosur	#10	Withdrew	N/A
US Open; New York City, United States; Grand Slam; Hard, outdoor 29 August - 11 September 2011	594	1R	(Serbia) Bojana Jovanovski	#54	Win	6–1, 6–1
US Open; New York City, United States; Grand Slam; Hard, outdoor 29 August - 11 September 2011	595	2R	(Netherlands) Michaëlla Krajicek	#183	Win	6–0, 6–1
US Open; New York City, United States; Grand Slam; Hard, outdoor 29 August - 11 September 2011	596	3R	(Belarus) Victoria Azarenka	#5	Win	6–1, 7–6^{(7–5)}
US Open; New York City, United States; Grand Slam; Hard, outdoor 29 August - 11 September 2011	597	4R	(Serbia) Ana Ivanovic	#19	Win	6–3, 6–4
US Open; New York City, United States; Grand Slam; Hard, outdoor 29 August - 11 September 2011	598	QF	(Russia) Anastasia Pavlyuchenkova	#16	Win	7–5, 6–1
US Open; New York City, United States; Grand Slam; Hard, outdoor 29 August - 11 September 2011	599	SF	(Denmark) Caroline Wozniacki	#1	Win	6–2, 6–4
US Open; New York City, United States; Grand Slam; Hard, outdoor 29 August - 11 September 2011	600	F	(Australia) Samantha Stosur	#10	Loss	2–6, 3–6

== Tournament schedule ==
=== Singles schedule ===
Williams' 2011 singles tournament schedule is as follows:

Date	Championship	Location	Category	Surface	Points	Outcome
13 June 2011– 19 June 2011	Aegon International	Eastbourne (UK)	WTA Premier	Hard	60	Second Round lost to Vera Zvonareva, 6–4, 6-7^{(5-7)}, 5-7
20 June 2011– 3 July 2011	The Championships, Wimbledon	Wimbledon (GBR)	Grand Slam	Grass	280	Fourth Round lost to Marion Bartoli, 3–6, 6-7^{(6-7)}
25 July 2011– 31 July 2011	Bank of the West Classic	Standford (USA)	WTA Premier	Hard	470	Winner defeated Marion Bartoli, 7–5, 6–1
8 August 2011– 14 August 2011	Rogers Cup	Montreal (CAN)	WTA Premier 5	Hard	900	Winner defeated Samantha Stosur, 6–4, 6–2
15 August 2011– 21 August 2011	Western & Southern Open	Cincinnati (USA)	WTA Premier 5	Hard	70	Second Round; Withdrew before match against Samantha Stosur
29 August 2011– 12 September 2011	US Open	New York (USA)	Grand Slam	Hard	1400	Final lost to Samantha Stosur, 2–6, 3–6
Total year-end points					3180	

== Yearly records ==
=== Head-to-head matchups ===
Ordered by percentage of wins

- (Belarus) Victoria Azarenka 2–0
- (Russia) Maria Kirilenko 2–0
- (Bulgaria) Tsvetana Pironkova 1–0
- (France) Aravane Rezaï 1–0
- (Serbia) Bojana Jovanovski 1–0
- (Romania) Simona Halep 1–0
- (Australia) Anastasia Rodionova 1–0
- (Russia) Maria Sharapova 1-0
- (Germany) Sabine Lisicki 1–0
- (Ukraine) Alona Bondarenko 1–0
- (Germany) Julia Görges 1–0
- (China) Zheng Jie 1–0
- (Czech Republic) Lucie Šafářová 1–0
- (Czech Republic) Lucie Hradecká 1–0
- (Belarus) Olga Govortsova 1–0
- (Netherlands) Michaëlla Krajicek 1–0
- (Russia) Anastasia Pavlyuchenkova 1–0
- (Serbia) Ana Ivanovic 1–0
- (Denmark) Caroline Wozniacki 1–0
- (Australia) Samantha Stosur 1–1
- (France) Marion Bartoli 1–1
- (Russia) Vera Zvonareva 0–1

=== Finals ===
==== Singles: 2 (2–1) ====
Legend Grand Slam (0–1) WTA Premier 5 (1–0) WTA Premier (1–0)	Finals by surface Hard (2–1)	Finals by venue Outdoors (2–1)

Outcome	No.	Date	Championship	Surface	Opponent in the final	Score in the final
Winner	38.	July 31, 2011	Stanford, U.S.	Hard	(France) Marion Bartoli	7–5, 6–1
Winner	39.	August 14, 2011	Toronto, Canada	Hard	(Australia) Samantha Stosur	6–4, 6–2
Runner-up	15.	September 11, 2011	US Open, New York City, U.S.	Hard	(Australia) Samantha Stosur	6–2, 6–3

=== Earnings ===
#	Event	Prize money	Year-to-date
1	Aegon International	$8,250	$8,250
3	Wimbledon Championships	£68,750	$118,250
4	Bank of the West Classic	$111,000	$229,250
5	Rogers Cup	$360,000	$589,250
6	Western & Southern Open	$10,575	$599,825
7	US Open	$1,379,105	$1,978,930
			$1,978,930

Figures in United States dollars (USD) unless noted.

== See also ==
- 2011 WTA Tour

Sporting positions
Preceded by Venus Williams; Angelique Kerber	World No. 1 First stint: July 8, 2002 – August 10, 2003; Last stint: April 24, 2017 – May 14, 2017	Succeeded by Kim Clijsters; Angelique Kerber
Preceded by Jennifer Capriati; Justine Henin; Petra Kvitová	Year-end World No. 1; 2002; 2008, 2009; 2012 – 2015	Succeeded by Justine Henin; Kim Clijsters; Angelique Kerber
Awards
Preceded by Jennifer Capriati; Jelena Janković; Petra Kvitová	ITF Women's Singles World Champion; 2002; 2009; 2012 – 2015	Succeeded by Justine Henin; Caroline Wozniacki; Angelique Kerber
Preceded by Martina Hingis & Anna Kournikova; Cara Black & Liezel Huber	WTA Doubles Team of the Year; 2000 (with Venus Williams); 2009 (with Venus Williams)	Succeeded by Lisa Raymond & Rennae Stubbs; Gisela Dulko & Flavia Pennetta
Preceded by Cara Black & Liezel Huber	ITF Women's Doubles World Champion; 2009 (with Venus Williams)	Succeeded by Gisela Dulko & Flavia Pennetta
