= 2011 Wimbledon Championships – Women's doubles =

Women's doubles
- 2011 Wimbledon Championships

Final
- Champions: (Czech Republic) Květa Peschke (Slovenia) Katarina Srebotnik
- Runners-up: (Germany) Sabine Lisicki (Australia) Samantha Stosur
- Score: 6–3, 6–1

Details
- Draw: 64 (4 Q / 4 WC )
- Seeds: 16

Events
Singles	men	women		boys	girls
Doubles	men	women	mixed	boys	girls
WC Singles	men	women	quad
WC Doubles	men	women	quad
Legends	men	women	seniors
← 2010 ·	Wimbledon Championships	· 2012 →

Vania King and Yaroslava Shvedova were the defending champions but lost in the second round to Sabine Lisicki and Samantha Stosur.

Květa Peschke and Katarina Srebotnik defeated Lisicki and Stosur in the final, 6–3, 6–1 to win the ladies' doubles tennis title at the 2011 Wimbledon Championships. It was the first Grand Slam title for the veteran couple, and allowed them to take the No. 1 ranking.

== Seeds ==
1. (United States) Vania King / (Kazakhstan) Yaroslava Shvedova (second round)
2. (Czech Republic) Květa Peschke / (Slovenia) Katarina Srebotnik (champions)
3. (United States) Liezel Huber / (United States) Lisa Raymond (quarterfinals)
4. (India) Sania Mirza / (Russia) Elena Vesnina (semifinals)
5. (United States) Bethanie Mattek-Sands / (United States) Meghann Shaughnessy (second round)
6. (Russia) Nadia Petrova / (Australia) Anastasia Rodionova (quarterfinals)
7. (Czech Republic) Andrea Hlaváčková / (Czech Republic) Lucie Hradecká (first round)
8. (China) Peng Shuai / (China) Zheng Jie (quarterfinals)
9. (Germany) Julia Görges / (Russia) Maria Kirilenko (first round)
10. (Czech Republic) Iveta Benešová / (Czech Republic) Barbora Záhlavová-Strýcová (third round)
11. (Spain) María José Martínez Sánchez / (Spain) Anabel Medina Garrigues (second round)
12. (Chinese Taipei) Chan Yung-jan / (Romania) Monica Niculescu (second round)
13. (Slovakia) Daniela Hantuchová / (Poland) Agnieszka Radwańska (third round)
14. (Zimbabwe) Cara Black / (Israel) Shahar Pe'er (third round)
15. (Chinese Taipei) Chuang Chia-jung / (Chinese Taipei) Hsieh Su-wei (first round)
16. (Belarus) Olga Govortsova / (Russia) Alla Kudryavtseva (second round)

Click on the seed number of a player to go to their draw section.

== Draw ==
=== Key ===
- Q = Qualifier
- WC = Wild card
- LL = Lucky loser
- Alt = Alternate
- ITF = ITF entry
- PR = Protected ranking
- SR = Special ranking
- SE = Special exempt
- JE = Junior exempt
- JR = Junior Accelerator Programme entrant
- CO = College Accelerator Programme entrant
- NG = Next Gen Accelerator Program entrant
- w/o = Walkover
- r = Retired
- d = Defaulted

=== Finals ===
Quarterfinals
(Germany) Sabine Lisicki (Australia) Samantha Stosur	7	1	6
6	(Russia) Nadia Petrova (Australia) Anastasia Rodionova	5	6	1
3	(United States) Liezel Huber (United States) Lisa Raymond	6	6^{1}	11
LL	(New Zealand) Marina Erakovic (Thailand) Tamarine Tanasugarn	4	7^{7}	13
(Spain) Nuria Llagostera Vives (Spain) Arantxa Parra Santonja	6	4	5
4	(India) Sania Mirza (Russia) Elena Vesnina	3	6	7
8	(China) Peng Shuai (China) Zheng Jie	2	7^{9}	4
2	(Czech Republic) Květa Peschke (Slovenia) Katarina Srebotnik	6	6^{7}	6

Semifinals
(Germany) Sabine Lisicki (Australia) Samantha Stosur	6	4	8
LL	(New Zealand) Marina Erakovic (Thailand) Tamarine Tanasugarn	3	6	6
4	(India) Sania Mirza (Russia) Elena Vesnina	3	1
2	(Czech Republic) Květa Peschke (Slovenia) Katarina Srebotnik	6	6

Final
(Germany) Sabine Lisicki (Australia) Samantha Stosur	3	1
2	(Czech Republic) Květa Peschke (Slovenia) Katarina Srebotnik	6	6

=== Top half ===
==== Section 1 ====
First round
1	(United States) V King (Kazakhstan) Y Shvedova	6	0
(Romania) S Halep (United States) V Lepchenko	1	0^{r}
(Germany) S Lisicki (Australia) S Stosur	6	6
(Serbia) J Janković (Russia) A Pavlyuchenkova	3	1
WC	(United Kingdom) J Rae (United Kingdom) H Watson	4	4
LL	(France) S Lefèvre (Russia) E Rodina	6	6
(Romania) S Cîrstea (Japan) A Morita	6	6
15	(Chinese Taipei) C-j Chuang (Chinese Taipei) S-w Hsieh	4	4
11	(Spain) MJ Martínez Sánchez (Spain) A Medina Garrigues	6	6
(Sweden) S Arvidsson (Slovenia) A Klepač	4	1
(Russia) V Diatchenko (Russia) M Kondratieva	6	2	0
(Russia) V Dushevina (Russia) E Makarova	3	6	6
(Chinese Taipei) K-c Chang (United States) J Craybas	1	2
(Serbia) A Ivanovic (Germany) A Petkovic	6	6
(Romania) I-C Begu (Hungary) M Czink	1	2
6	(Russia) N Petrova (Australia) An Rodionova	6	6

Second round
1	(United States) V King (Kazakhstan) Y Shvedova	4	3
(Germany) S Lisicki (Australia) S Stosur	6	6
LL	(France) S Lefèvre (Russia) E Rodina	5	3
(Romania) S Cîrstea (Japan) A Morita	7	6
11	(Spain) MJ Martínez Sánchez (Spain) A Medina Garrigues	3	4
(Russia) V Dushevina (Russia) E Makarova	6	6
(Serbia) A Ivanovic (Germany) A Petkovic	3	6	1
6	(Russia) N Petrova (Australia) An Rodionova	6	3	6

Third round
(Germany) S Lisicki (Australia) S Stosur	6	6
(Romania) S Cîrstea (Japan) A Morita	4	3
(Russia) V Dushevina (Russia) E Makarova	6^{2}	4
6	(Russia) N Petrova (Australia) An Rodionova	7^{7}	6

Quarterfinals
(Germany) S Lisicki (Australia) S Stosur	7	1	6
6	(Russia) N Petrova (Australia) An Rodionova	5	6	1

==== Section 2 ====
First round
3	(United States) L Huber (United States) L Raymond	6	6
(Australia) J Dokic (Serbia) B Jovanovski	1	2
(Netherlands) M Krajicek (Czech Republic) L Šafářová	4	3
Q	(Poland) U Radwańska (Russia) Ar Rodionova	6	6
(Germany) A Kerber (United States) C McHale	6	6
LL	(Thailand) N Lertcheewakarn (Australia) J Moore	2	4
WC	(United Kingdom) A Keothavong (United Kingdom) L Robson	5	2
16	(Belarus) O Govortsova (Russia) A Kudryavtseva	7	6
10	(Czech Republic) I Benešová (Czech Republic) B Záhlavová-Strýcová	7^{7}	6
(Slovakia) D Cibulková (Czech Republic) P Kvitová	6^{3}	4
(Germany) K Barrois (Germany) A-L Grönefeld	6	7^{7}
(Australia) C Dellacqua (Australia) R Stubbs	3	6^{2}
Q	(United States) L Lee-Waters (United States) M Moulton-Levy	3	2
LL	(New Zealand) M Erakovic (Thailand) T Tanasugarn	6	6
(Poland) K Jans (Poland) A Rosolska	6	1	6
7	(Czech Republic) A Hlaváčková (Czech Republic) L Hradecká	2	6	4

Second round
3	(United States) L Huber (United States) L Raymond	6	6
Q	(Poland) U Radwańska (Russia) Ar Rodionova	1	0
(Germany) A Kerber (United States) C McHale	2	6	6
16	(Belarus) O Govortsova (Russia) A Kudryavtseva	6	2	1
10	(Czech Republic) I Benešová (Czech Republic) B Záhlavová-Strýcová	5	7	6
(Germany) K Barrois (Germany) A-L Grönefeld	7	5	4
LL	(New Zealand) M Erakovic (Thailand) T Tanasugarn	3	6	6
(Poland) K Jans (Poland) A Rosolska	6	2	3

Third round
3	(United States) L Huber (United States) L Raymond	6	6
(Germany) A Kerber (United States) C McHale	1	0
10	(Czech Republic) I Benešová (Czech Republic) B Záhlavová-Strýcová	2	1
LL	(New Zealand) M Erakovic (Thailand) T Tanasugarn	6	6

Quarterfinals
3	(United States) L Huber (United States) L Raymond	6	6^{1}	11
LL	(New Zealand) M Erakovic (Thailand) T Tanasugarn	4	7^{7}	13

=== Bottom half ===
==== Section 3 ====
First round
5	(United States) B Mattek-Sands (United States) M Shaughnessy	7^{7}	7
(Spain) L Domínguez Lino (Spain) L Pous Tió	6^{1}	5
(Spain) N Llagostera Vives (Spain) A Parra Santonja	6	3
(Ukraine) O Savchuk (Latvia) A Sevastova	3	0^{r}
(Italy) S Errani (Italy) R Vinci	3	6	6
Q	(Japan) S Aoyama (Japan) R Fujiwara	6	2	3
(Bulgaria) T Pironkova (South Africa) C Scheepers	6	5	6
9	(Germany) J Görges (Russia) M Kirilenko	2	7	4
13	(Slovakia) D Hantuchová (Poland) A Radwańska	6	6
(Austria) S Klemenschits (Austria) T Paszek	3	2
(Canada) R Marino (Turkey) İ Şenoğlu	3	2
(South Africa) N Grandin (Czech Republic) V Uhlířová	6	6
WC	(United Kingdom) N Broady (United Kingdom) E Webley-Smith	3	4
(Czech Republic) R Voráčová (Kazakhstan) G Voskoboeva	6	6
(Russia) A Chakvetadze (United States) M Oudin	0	6^{4}
4	(India) S Mirza (Russia) E Vesnina	6	7^{7}

Second round
5	(United States) B Mattek-Sands (United States) M Shaughnessy	6	3	2
(Spain) N Llagostera Vives (Spain) A Parra Santonja	3	6	6
(Italy) S Errani (Italy) R Vinci	6	6
(Bulgaria) T Pironkova (South Africa) C Scheepers	3	1
13	(Slovakia) D Hantuchová (Poland) A Radwańska	4	6	6
(South Africa) N Grandin (Czech Republic) V Uhlířová	6	4	4
(Czech Republic) R Voráčová (Kazakhstan) G Voskoboeva	3	7	4
4	(India) S Mirza (Russia) E Vesnina	6	5	6

Third round
(Spain) N Llagostera Vives (Spain) A Parra Santonja	7	6
(Italy) S Errani (Italy) R Vinci	5	4
13	(Slovakia) D Hantuchová (Poland) A Radwańska	4	3
4	(India) S Mirza (Russia) E Vesnina	6	6

Quarterfinals
(Spain) N Llagostera Vives (Spain) A Parra Santonja	6	4	5
4	(India) S Mirza (Russia) E Vesnina	3	6	7

==== Section 4 ====
First round
8	(China) S Peng (China) J Zheng	4	6	6
(Uzbekistan) A Amanmuradova (Russia) A Panova	6	4	3
(Ukraine) M Koryttseva (Belarus) T Poutchek	6	6
(France) A Cornet (France) A Rezaï	3	2
(Italy) F Pennetta (Italy) F Schiavone	3	6	4
(Japan) K Date-Krumm (China) S Zhang	6	2	6
(Italy) A Brianti (Greece) E Daniilidou	4	6	1
12	(Chinese Taipei) Y-j Chan (Romania) M Niculescu	6	1	6
14	' (Zimbabwe) C Black (Israel) S Pe'er	6	6
WC	(United Kingdom) S Borwell (United Kingdom) M South	3	3
(Sweden) J Larsson (Germany) J Wöhr	5	2
(United States) R Kops-Jones (United States) A Spears	7	6
(Australia) J Gajdošová (Czech Republic) K Zakopalová	6	7
(France) M Johansson (France) P Parmentier	4	5
Q	(Russia) V Dolonc (Hungary) K Marosi	3	6^{5}
2	(Czech Republic) K Peschke (Slovenia) K Srebotnik	6	7^{7}

Second round
8	(China) S Peng (China) J Zheng	6	6^{6}	6
(Ukraine) M Koryttseva (Belarus) T Poutchek	3	7^{8}	0
(Japan) K Date-Krumm (China) S Zhang	6	6
12	(Chinese Taipei) Y-j Chan (Romania) M Niculescu	2	4
14	(Zimbabwe) C Black (Israel) S Pe'er	6	6
(United States) R Kops-Jones (United States) A Spears	2	3
(Australia) J Gajdošová (Czech Republic) K Zakopalová	3	1
2	(Czech Republic) K Peschke (Slovenia) K Srebotnik	6	6

Third round
8	(China) S Peng (China) J Zheng	6	6
(Japan) K Date-Krumm (China) S Zhang	4	2
14	(Zimbabwe) C Black (Israel) S Pe'er	2	7	3
2	(Czech Republic) K Peschke (Slovenia) K Srebotnik	6	5	6

Quarterfinals
8	(China) S Peng (China) J Zheng	2	7^{9}	4
2	(Czech Republic) K Peschke (Slovenia) K Srebotnik	6	6^{7}	6
