= 2011 Fed Cup World Group =

Part of tennis tournament

- Date: 5 February – 6 November
- Edition: 21st

Champions
- Czech Republic
- Fed Cup

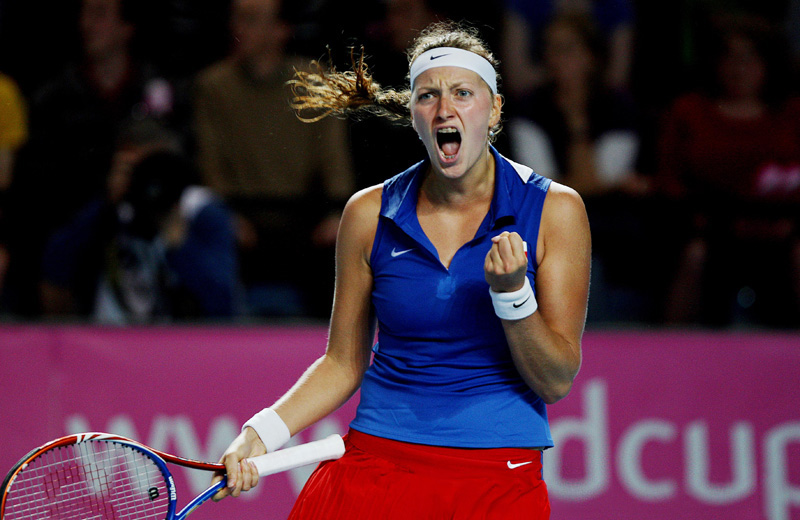
Petra Kvitová in the final match against Svetlana Kuznetsova

The World Group was the highest level of Fed Cup competition in 2011. Eight nations competed in a three-round knockout competition. Italy was the two-time defending champion, but they were defeated in the semifinals by four-time former champion Russia.

The Russians were defeated in the final by Czech Republic, 3–2, in their first final and title since 1988.

== Participating teams ==
Participating teams
Australia	Belgium	Czech Republic	France
Italy	Russia	Slovakia	United States

== Draw ==
Quarterfinals; 5–6 February
Hobart, Australia (Outdoor hard)
1	Italy	4
Australia	1
Moscow, Russia (Indoor hard)
France	2
3	Russia	3
Bratislava, Slovakia (Indoor hard)
4	Czech Republic	3
Slovakia	2
Antwerp, Belgium (Indoor hard)
Belgium	4
2	United States	1

Semifinals; 16–17 April
Moscow, Russia (Indoor hard)
1	Italy	0
3	Russia	5
Charleroi, Belgium (Indoor hard)
4	Czech Republic	3
Belgium	2

Final; 5–6 November
Moscow, Russia (Indoor hard)
3	Russia	2
4	Czech Republic	3

== First round ==
=== Italy vs. Australia ===
Italy
4
Hobart International Tennis Centre, Hobart, Australia
5–6 February 2011
Plexicushion hard (outdoors)

Australia
1

			1	2	3
1	(Italy) (Australia)	Francesca Schiavone; Jarmila Groth	7^{7} 6^{4}	3; 6	3; 6
2	(Italy) (Australia)	Flavia Pennetta; Samantha Stosur	7^{7} 6^{5}	6^{5} 7^{7}	6; 4
3	(Italy) (Australia)	Francesca Schiavone; Samantha Stosur	7^{7} 6^{1}	3; 6	7; 5
4	(Italy) (Australia)	Flavia Pennetta; Jarmila Groth	6; 3	6; 2
5	(Italy) (Australia)	Sara Errani / Roberta Vinci; Anastasia Rodionova / Rennae Stubbs	2; 6	7^{7} 6^{1}	6; 4

=== France vs. Russia ===
France
2
Olympic Stadium, Moscow, Russia
5–6 February 2011
RuKortHard (indoors)

Russia
3

			1	2	3
1	(France) (Russia)	Alizé Cornet; Svetlana Kuznetsova	3; 6	6; 3	6; 4
2	(France) (Russia)	Virginie Razzano; Maria Sharapova	6; 3	6; 4
3	(France) (Russia)	Alizé Cornet; Anastasia Pavlyuchenkova	6; 3	3; 6	2; 6
4	(France) (Russia)	Virginie Razzano; Svetlana Kuznetsova	4; 6	4; 6
5	(France) (Russia)	Julie Coin / Alizé Cornet; Svetlana Kuznetsova / Anastasia Pavlyuchenkova	6^{4} 7^{7}	0; 6

=== Czech Republic vs. Slovakia ===
Czech Republic
3
Sibamac Arena, Bratislava, Slovakia
5–6 February 2011
Latex-ite hard (indoors)

Slovakia
2

			1	2	3
1	(Czech Republic) (Slovakia)	Lucie Šafářová; Daniela Hantuchová	7; 5	6; 1
2	(Czech Republic) (Slovakia)	Petra Kvitová; Dominika Cibulková	6; 2	6; 3
3	(Czech Republic) (Slovakia)	Petra Kvitová; Daniela Hantuchová	6; 4	6; 2
4	(Czech Republic) (Slovakia)	Lucie Šafářová; Jana Čepelová	6; 4	6^{5} 7^{7}		retired
5	(Czech Republic) (Slovakia)	Květa Peschke / Barbora Záhlavová Strýcová; Jana Čepelová / Magdaléna Rybáriková	1; 6	6; 4	6^{4} 7^{7}

=== Belgium vs. United States ===
Belgium
4
Sportpaleis Antwerp, Merksem, Belgium
5–6 February 2011
Acrylic hard (indoors)

United States
1

			1	2	3
1	(Belgium) (United States)	Yanina Wickmayer; Bethanie Mattek-Sands	6; 1	7^{8} 6^{6}
2	(Belgium) (United States)	Kim Clijsters; Melanie Oudin	6; 0	6; 4
3	(Belgium) (United States)	Kim Clijsters; Bethanie Mattek-Sands	6^{12} 7^{14}	6; 2	6; 1
4	(Belgium) (United States)	Yanina Wickmayer; Melanie Oudin	6; 2	6; 0
5	(Belgium) (United States)	Kirsten Flipkens / An-Sophie Mestach; Liezel Huber / Vania King	3; 6	5; 7

== Semifinals ==
=== Italy vs. Russia ===
Italy
0
Megasport Arena, Moscow, Russia
16–17 April 2011
RuKortHard (indoors)

Russia
5

			1	2	3
1	(Italy) (Russia)	Sara Errani; Vera Zvonareva	0; 6	2; 6
2	(Italy) (Russia)	Roberta Vinci; Svetlana Kuznetsova	2; 6	7^{7} 6^{4}	1; 6
3	(Italy) (Russia)	Roberta Vinci; Vera Zvonareva	4; 6	2; 6
4	(Italy) (Russia)	Sara Errani; Anastasia Pavlyuchenkova	6^{5} 7^{7}	6^{4} 7^{7}
5	(Italy) (Russia)	Alberta Brianti / Maria Elena Camerin; Ekaterina Makarova / Anastasia Pavlyuchenkova	6^{3} 7^{7}	1; 6

=== Czech Republic vs. Belgium ===
Czech Republic
3
Spiroudome, Charleroi, Belgium
16–17 April 2011
Acrylic hard (indoors)

Belgium
2

			1	2	3
1	(Czech Republic) (Belgium)	Petra Kvitová; Kirsten Flipkens	6; 2	7^{7} 6^{4}
2	(Czech Republic) (Belgium)	Barbora Záhlavová-Strýcová; Yanina Wickmayer	4; 6	4; 6
3	(Czech Republic) (Belgium)	Petra Kvitová; Yanina Wickmayer	5; 7	6; 4	6; 2
4	(Czech Republic) (Belgium)	Barbora Záhlavová-Strýcová; Kirsten Flipkens	2; 6	3; 6
5	(Czech Republic) (Belgium)	Iveta Benešová / Barbora Záhlavová-Strýcová; Kirsten Flipkens / Yanina Wickmayer	6; 4	6; 4

== Final ==
=== Russia vs. Czech Republic ===
Russia
2
Olympic Stadium, Moscow, Russia
5–6 November 2011
RuKortHard (indoors)

Czech Republic
3

			1	2	3
1	(Russia) (Czech Republic)	Maria Kirilenko; Petra Kvitová	2; 6	2; 6
2	(Russia) (Czech Republic)	Svetlana Kuznetsova; Lucie Šafářová	6; 2	6; 3
3	(Russia) (Czech Republic)	Svetlana Kuznetsova; Petra Kvitová	6; 4	2; 6	3; 6
4	(Russia) (Czech Republic)	Anastasia Pavlyuchenkova; Lucie Šafářová	6; 2	6; 4
5	(Russia) (Czech Republic)	Maria Kirilenko / Elena Vesnina; Lucie Hradecká / Květa Peschke	4; 6	2; 6

2011 Fed Cup champions

Czech Republic
Sixth title

== See also ==
- Fed Cup structure
