= 2011 Wimbledon Championships – Women's singles =

Women's singles
- 2011 Wimbledon Championships

Final
- Champion: (Czech Republic) Petra Kvitová
- Runner-up: (Russia) Maria Sharapova
- Score: 6–3, 6–4

Details
- Draw: 128 (12 Q / 7 WC )
- Seeds: 32

Events
Singles	men	women		boys	girls
Doubles	men	women	mixed	boys	girls
WC Singles	men	women	quad
WC Doubles	men	women	quad
Legends	men	women	seniors
← 2010 ·	Wimbledon Championships	· 2012 →

Petra Kvitová defeated Maria Sharapova in the final, 6–3, 6–4 to win the ladies' singles title at the 2011 Wimbledon Championships. It was her first major title. Kvitová became the first player (men's or women's) born in the 1990s to win a major, the first Czech to win the title since Jana Novotná in 1998, and the first left-hander to win the title since Martina Navratilova in 1990.

Serena Williams was the two-time defending champion, but was defeated in the fourth round by Marion Bartoli. With the loss of Venus Williams in the fourth round, it guaranteed a first-time major finalist from the bottom half of the draw. For the first time since 1913, all eight quarterfinalists came from Europe. This also marked the first Wimbledon main draw appearance of future champion Simona Halep, who lost in the second round to Serena Williams (incidentally, Halep would defeat Serena Williams to claim her Wimbledon title).

== Seeds ==
1. (Denmark) Caroline Wozniacki (fourth round)
2. (Russia) Vera Zvonareva (third round)
3. (China) Li Na (second round)
4. (Belarus) Victoria Azarenka (semifinals)
5. (Russia) Maria Sharapova (final)
6. (Italy) Francesca Schiavone (third round)
7. (United States) Serena Williams (fourth round)
8. (Czech Republic) Petra Kvitová (champion)
9. (France) Marion Bartoli (quarterfinals)
10. (Australia) Samantha Stosur (first round)
11. (Germany) Andrea Petkovic (third round)
12. (Russia) Svetlana Kuznetsova (third round)
13. (Poland) Agnieszka Radwańska (second round)
14. (Russia) Anastasia Pavlyuchenkova (second round)
15. (Serbia) Jelena Janković (first round)
16. (Germany) Julia Görges (third round)

17. (Estonia) Kaia Kanepi (first round)
18. (Serbia) Ana Ivanovic (third round)
19. (Belgium) Yanina Wickmayer (fourth round)
20. (China) Peng Shuai (fourth round)
21. (Italy) Flavia Pennetta (third round)
22. (Israel) Shahar Pe'er (first round)
23. (United States) Venus Williams (fourth round)
24. (Slovakia) Dominika Cibulková (quarterfinals)
25. (Slovakia) Daniela Hantuchová (third round)
26. (Russia) Maria Kirilenko (third round)
27. (Australia) Jarmila Gajdošová (third round)
28. (Russia) Ekaterina Makarova (first round)
29. (Italy) Roberta Vinci (third round)
30. (United States) Bethanie Mattek-Sands (first round)
31. (Czech Republic) Lucie Šafářová (second round)
32. (Bulgaria) Tsvetana Pironkova (quarterfinals)

Click on the seed number of a player to go to their draw section.

== Draw ==
=== Key ===
- Q = Qualifier
- WC = Wild card
- LL = Lucky loser
- Alt = Alternate
- ITF = ITF entry
- PR = Protected ranking
- SR = Special ranking
- SE = Special exempt
- JE = Junior exempt
- JR = Junior Accelerator Programme entrant
- CO = College Accelerator Programme entrant
- NG = Next Gen Accelerator Program entrant
- w/o = Walkover
- r = Retired
- d = Defaulted

=== Finals ===
Quarterfinals
24	(Slovakia) Dominika Cibulková	1	1
5	(Russia) Maria Sharapova	6	6
WC	(Germany) Sabine Lisicki	6	6^{4}	6
9	(France) Marion Bartoli	4	7^{7}	1
(Austria) Tamira Paszek	3	1
4	(Belarus) Victoria Azarenka	6	6
8	(Czech Republic) Petra Kvitová	6	6^{5}	6
32	(Bulgaria) Tsvetana Pironkova	3	7^{7}	2

Semifinals
5	(Russia) Maria Sharapova	6	6
WC	(Germany) Sabine Lisicki	4	3
4	(Belarus) Victoria Azarenka	1	6	2
8	(Czech Republic) Petra Kvitová	6	3	6

Final
5	(Russia) Maria Sharapova	3	4
8	(Czech Republic) Petra Kvitová	6	6

=== Top half ===
==== Section 1 ====
First round
1	(Denmark) C Wozniacki	6	6
(Spain) A Parra Santonja	2	1
(India) S Mirza	6^{4}	6	3
(France) V Razzano	7^{7}	2	6
(Australia) A Rodionova	1	2
(Czech Republic) A Hlaváčková	6	6
(Ukraine) A Bondarenko	5	3
27	(Australia) J Gajdošová	7	6
24	(Slovakia) D Cibulková	3	6	8
(Croatia) M Lučić	6	3	6
(Slovenia) P Hercog	6^{3}	6	6
(Sweden) J Larsson	7^{7}	3	4
(France) M Johansson	2	6	6
WC	(United Kingdom) H Watson	6	4	4
(Spain) A Medina Garrigues	3	0
16	(Germany) J Görges	6	6

Second round
1	(Denmark) C Wozniacki	6	6
(France) V Razzano	1	3
(Czech Republic) A Hlaváčková	6^{1}	3
27	(Australia) J Gajdošová	7^{7}	6
24	(Slovakia) D Cibulková	6	6
(Slovenia) P Hercog	1	2
(France) M Johansson	6^{10}	2
16	(Germany) J Görges	7^{12}	6

Third round
1	(Denmark) C Wozniacki	6	6
27	(Australia) J Gajdošová	3	2
24	(Slovakia) D Cibulková	6	1	6
16	(Germany) J Görges	4	6	3

Fourth round
1	(Denmark) C Wozniacki	6	6^{5}	5
24	(Slovakia) D Cibulková	1	7^{7}	7

==== Section 2 ====
First round
10	(Australia) S Stosur	3	4
PR	(Hungary) M Czink	6	6
(Belarus) A Yakimova	4	6	6
(Sweden) S Arvidsson	6	2	1
(United Kingdom) E Baltacha	6	6
Q	(Germany) M Barthel	2	4
(Belgium) K Flipkens	0	4
20	(China) S Peng	6	6
31	(Czech Republic) L Šafářová	2	6	6
(Czech Republic) L Hradecká	6	3	3
(Czech Republic) K Zakopalová	6	5	8
WC	(United Kingdom) E Webley-Smith	3	7	6
(Germany) A Kerber	6	6^{4}	3
WC	(United Kingdom) L Robson	4	7^{7}	6
(Russia) A Chakvetadze	2	1
5	(Russia) M Sharapova	6	6

Second round
PR	(Hungary) M Czink	7	6
(Belarus) A Yakimova	5	3
(United Kingdom) E Baltacha	6	2	5
20	(China) S Peng	4	6	7
31	(Czech Republic) L Šafářová	0	7^{7}	4
(Czech Republic) K Zakopalová	6	6^{3}	6
WC	(United Kingdom) L Robson	6^{4}	3
5	(Russia) M Sharapova	7^{7}	6

Third round
PR	(Hungary) M Czink	2	6^{5}
20	(China) S Peng	6	7^{7}
(Czech Republic) K Zakopalová	2	3
5	(Russia) M Sharapova	6	6

Fourth round
20	(China) S Peng	4	2
5	(Russia) M Sharapova	6	6

==== Section 3 ====
First round
3	(China) N Li	6	6
(Russia) A Kudryavtseva	3	3
WC	(Germany) S Lisicki	6	6
(Latvia) A Sevastova	1	1
(China) J Zheng	7	6
(Czech Republic) Z Ondrášková	5	0
Q	(Japan) M Doi	6	5	7
30	(United States) B Mattek-Sands	4	7	5
18	(Serbia) A Ivanovic	6	6
(United States) M Oudin	0	1
(United States) C Vandeweghe	4	4
WC	(Greece) E Daniilidou	6	6
(Germany) K Barrois	2	7	2
(Czech Republic) P Cetkovská	6	5	6
(Belarus) O Govortsova	0	0^{r}
13	(Poland) A Radwańska	6	3

Second round
3	(China) N Li	6	4	6
WC	(Germany) S Lisicki	3	6	8
(China) J Zheng	3	1
Q	(Japan) M Doi	6	6
18	(Serbia) A Ivanovic	6	6
WC	(Greece) E Daniilidou	3	0
(Czech Republic) P Cetkovská	3	7^{7}	6
13	(Poland) A Radwańska	6	6^{5}	4

Third round
WC	(Germany) S Lisicki	6	6
Q	(Japan) M Doi	4	2
18	(Serbia) A Ivanovic	2	6^{0}
(Czech Republic) P Cetkovská	6	7^{7}

Fourth round
WC	(Germany) S Lisicki	7^{7}	6
(Czech Republic) P Cetkovská	6^{3}	1

==== Section 4 ====
First round
9	(France) M Bartoli	6	6
Q	(Czech Republic) Kr Plíšková	0	2
(Spain) L Domínguez Lino	6	6
(Italy) R Oprandi	0	1
(Russia) E Rodina	6	7
(South Africa) C Scheepers	3	5
(Romania) I-C Begu	6^{3}	6	2
21	(Italy) F Pennetta	7^{7}	4	6
26	(Russia) M Kirilenko	6	6
(Italy) A Brianti	2	1
Q	(Thailand) T Tanasugarn	6	6
(Kazakhstan) Y Shvedova	2	3
(Romania) S Halep	6	6
(Serbia) B Jovanovski	1	2
(France) A Rezaï	3	6	1
7	(United States) S Williams	6	3	6

Second round
9	(France) M Bartoli	4	7	6
(Spain) L Domínguez Lino	6	5	2
(Russia) E Rodina	4	2
21	(Italy) F Pennetta	6	6
26	(Russia) M Kirilenko	7	7
Q	(Thailand) T Tanasugarn	5	5
(Romania) S Halep	6	2	1
7	(United States) S Williams	3	6	6

Third round
9	(France) M Bartoli	5	6	9
21	(Italy) F Pennetta	7	4	7
26	(Russia) M Kirilenko	3	2
7	(United States) S Williams	6	6

Fourth round
9	(France) M Bartoli	6	7^{8}
7	(United States) S Williams	3	6^{6}

=== Bottom half ===
==== Section 5 ====
First round
6	(Italy) F Schiavone	6	1	6
(Australia) J Dokic	4	6	3
(Czech Republic) B Záhlavová-Strýcová	7^{9}	6
Q	(Canada) A Wozniak	6^{7}	4
(Japan) A Morita	7	3	0
(Austria) T Paszek	5	6	6
(United States) C McHale	2	6	8
28	(Russia) E Makarova	6	1	6
22	(Israel) S Pe'er	7	4	4
(Russia) K Pervak	5	6	6
(Romania) S Cîrstea	1	3
(France) P Parmentier	6	6
Q	(United States) I Falconi	2	2
LL	(Canada) S Dubois	6	6
LL	(France) S Foretz Gacon	3	4
11	(Germany) A Petkovic	6	6

Second round
6	(Italy) F Schiavone	7	6
(Czech Republic) B Záhlavová-Strýcová	5	3
(Austria) T Paszek	6	6
(United States) C McHale	4	1
(Russia) K Pervak	6	1	6
(France) P Parmentier	2	6	3
LL	(Canada) S Dubois	3	6	3
11	(Germany) A Petkovic	6	4	6

Third round
6	(Italy) F Schiavone	6	4	9
(Austria) T Paszek	3	6	11
(Russia) K Pervak	6	7^{7}
11	(Germany) A Petkovic	4	6^{2}

Fourth round
(Austria) T Paszek	6	2	6
(Russia) K Pervak	2	6	3

==== Section 6 ====
First round
14	(Russia) A Pavlyuchenkova	6	7^{7}
Q	(Ukraine) L Tsurenko	4	6^{3}
(Russia) V Dolonc	3	4
(Russia) N Petrova	6	6
(Ukraine) K Bondarenko	7	6
(France) A Cornet	5	2
(Italy) S Errani	6	6
17	(Estonia) K Kanepi	1	4
25	(Slovakia) D Hantuchová	4	7^{7}	6
Q	(Russia) V Diatchenko	6	6^{5}	3
Q	(Chinese Taipei) K-c Chang	4	2
Q	(New Zealand) M Erakovic	6	6
(Czech Republic) S Záhlavová	6	3	6
(Czech Republic) I Benešová	3	6	8
(Slovakia) M Rybáriková	4	2^{r}
4	(Belarus) V Azarenka	6	3

Second round
14	(Russia) A Pavlyuchenkova	3	3
(Russia) N Petrova	6	6
(Ukraine) K Bondarenko	6	5	6
(Italy) S Errani	4	7	2
25	(Slovakia) D Hantuchová	6	6
Q	(New Zealand) M Erakovic	3	1
(Czech Republic) I Benešová	0	3
4	(Belarus) V Azarenka	6	6

Third round
(Russia) N Petrova	6	6
(Ukraine) K Bondarenko	3	2
25	(Slovakia) D Hantuchová	3	6	2
4	(Belarus) V Azarenka	6	3	6

Fourth round
(Russia) N Petrova	2	2
4	(Belarus) V Azarenka	6	6

==== Section 7 ====
First round
8	(Czech Republic) P Kvitová	6	6
Q	(United States) A Glatch	2	2
WC	(United Kingdom) N Broady	2	4
(United Kingdom) A Keothavong	6	6
(Canada) R Marino	6	7^{7}
(Austria) P Mayr-Achleitner	3	6^{5}
(Russia) V Dushevina	5	2
29	(Italy) R Vinci	7	6
19	(Belgium) Y Wickmayer	7	6
(United States) V Lepchenko	5	3
(Russia) A Pivovarova	6	2	3
(Georgia (country)) A Tatishvili	3	6	6
(United States) J Craybas	2	4
(Romania) A Dulgheru	6	6
(China) S Zhang	6	3	4
12	(Russia) S Kuznetsova	3	6	6

Second round
8	(Czech Republic) P Kvitová	6	6
(United Kingdom) A Keothavong	2	1
(Canada) R Marino	6^{3}	2
29	(Italy) R Vinci	7^{7}	6
19	(Belgium) Y Wickmayer	3	6	6
(Georgia (country)) A Tatishvili	6	4	2
(Romania) A Dulgheru	0	2
12	(Russia) S Kuznetsova	6	6

Third round
8	(Czech Republic) P Kvitová	6	6
29	(Italy) R Vinci	3	3
19	(Belgium) Y Wickmayer	4	6	6
12	(Russia) S Kuznetsova	6	3	4

Fourth round
8	(Czech Republic) P Kvitová	6	6
19	(Belgium) Y Wickmayer	0	2

==== Section 8 ====
First round
15	(Serbia) J Janković	7	4	3
(Spain) MJ Martínez Sánchez	5	6	6
(Romania) M Niculescu	6	6
(Austria) S Bammer	1	1
WC	(United Kingdom) K O'Brien	0	5
(Japan) K Date-Krumm	6	7
(Uzbekistan) A Amanmuradova	3	1
23	(United States) V Williams	6	6
32	(Bulgaria) T Pironkova	6	6
Q	(Italy) C Giorgi	2	1
(United States) V King	7	2	2
(Croatia) P Martić	5	6	6
(Russia) E Vesnina	6	6
(Spain) L Pous Tió	4	3
(United States) A Riske	0	6	3
2	(Russia) V Zvonareva	6	3	6

Second round
(Spain) MJ Martínez Sánchez	6	6
(Romania) M Niculescu	3	0
(Japan) K Date-Krumm	7^{8}	3	6
23	(United States) V Williams	6^{6}	6	8
32	(Bulgaria) T Pironkova	6	6
(Croatia) P Martić	1	4
(Russia) E Vesnina	1	6^{5}
2	(Russia) V Zvonareva	6	7^{7}

Third round
(Spain) MJ Martínez Sánchez	0	2
23	(United States) V Williams	6	6
32	(Bulgaria) T Pironkova	6	6
2	(Russia) V Zvonareva	2	3

Fourth round
23	(United States) V Williams	2	3
32	(Bulgaria) T Pironkova	6	6

== Championship match statistics ==
Category	(Czech Republic) Kvitová	(Russia) Sharapova
1st serve %	43/65 (66%)	48/63 (76%)
1st serve points won	31 of 43 = 72%	28 of 48 = 58%
2nd serve points won	8 of 22 = 36%	4 of 15 = 27%
Total service points won	39 of 65 = 60.00%	32 of 63 = 50.79%
Aces	1	3
Double faults	4	6
Winners	19	10
Unforced errors	13	12
Net points won	7 of 11 = 64%	4 of 4 = 100%
Break points converted	5 of 9 = 56%	3 of 5 = 60%
Return points won	31 of 63 = 49%	26 of 65 = 40%
Total points won	70	58

Preceded by 2011 French Open – Women's singles	Grand Slam women's singles	Succeeded by 2011 US Open – Women's singles
