= 2011 Wimbledon Championships =

- Date: 20 June – 3 July
- Edition: 125th
- Category: Grand Slam (ITF)
- Draw: 128S / 64D / 48XD
- Prize money: £14,600,000
- Surface: Grass
- Location: Church Road; SW19, Wimbledon, London, United Kingdom
- Venue: All England Lawn Tennis and Croquet Club
- Attendance: 494,761

Champions

Men's singles
- (Serbia) Novak Djokovic

Women's singles
- (Czech Republic) Petra Kvitová

Men's doubles
- (United States) Bob Bryan / (United States) Mike Bryan

Women's doubles
- (Czech Republic) Květa Peschke / (Slovenia) Katarina Srebotnik

Mixed doubles
- (Austria) Jürgen Melzer / (Czech Republic) Iveta Benešová

Wheelchair men's doubles
- (Netherlands) Maikel Scheffers / (Netherlands) Ronald Vink

Wheelchair women's doubles
- (Netherlands) Esther Vergeer / (Netherlands) Sharon Walraven

Boys' singles
- (Australia) Luke Saville

Girls' singles
- (Australia) Ashleigh Barty

Boys' doubles
- (United Kingdom) George Morgan / (Croatia) Mate Pavić

Girls' doubles
- (Canada) Eugenie Bouchard / (United States) Grace Min

Gentlemen's invitation doubles
- (Netherlands) Jacco Eltingh / (Netherlands) Paul Haarhuis

Ladies' invitation doubles
- (United States) Lindsay Davenport / (Switzerland) Martina Hingis

Senior gentlemen's invitation doubles
- (Australia) Pat Cash / (Australia) Mark Woodforde
- Wimbledon Championships

The 2011 Wimbledon Championships was a tennis tournament played on grass courts at the All England Lawn Tennis and Croquet Club in Wimbledon, London in the United Kingdom. It was the 125th edition of the Wimbledon Championships and were held from 20 June to 3 July 2011. It was the third Grand Slam tennis event of the year and was part of the ATP World Tour, the WTA Tour, the ITF Junior Tour, the NEC Tour and the London Prepares series of test events for the following year's London Olympics. The championships were organised by the All England Lawn Tennis and Croquet Club and the International Tennis Federation.

In the professional tournaments there were two new singles champions for the first time since 2002: Novak Djokovic and Petra Kvitová. By reaching the final Djokovic also claimed the World No. 1 in the ATP rankings from Rafael Nadal, while Kvitová became the first Grand Slam event winner born in the 1990s. In the doubles the Bryan brothers claimed the men's title for a second time, and equalled the overall Grand Slam tournament record of 11 set by the Woodies, Mark Woodforde and Todd Woodbridge. In the women's doubles Katarina Srebotnik won her first ladies major title after making four previous major finals. Srebotnik won alongside Květa Peschke; this was Peschke's first major title. In the mixed doubles Jürgen Melzer won his second major title, and first in the mixed doubles as he partnered Iveta Benešová to her first major title. In total, players from the Czech Republic (Kvitová, Peschke, and Benešová) were champions in three of the five main tour events in the tournament.

In the junior tournaments both the boys and girls singles titles were won by Australians. Luke Saville won the boys title while Ashleigh Barty became the first Australian in 31 years to win the girls title. In the doubles, there was home success as Brit George Morgan and Croatian Mate Pavić won their maiden junior Grand Slam tournament titles. The girls doubles title was claimed by Canadian Eugenie Bouchard and American Grace Min.

In the wheelchair events Esther Vergeer and Sharon Walraven retained their doubles title. This was Vergeer's third successive win at the championships and meant that she was still unbeaten at Wimbledon. In the men's event Maikel Scheffers and Ronald Vink completed a team career Grand Slam, as they won the only title they had previously failed to win as a team.

The legends events titles were won by the teams of: Lindsay Davenport and Martina Hingis, the Dutch pair of Jacco Eltingh and Paul Haarhuis, and the Australian pair of Pat Cash and Mark Woodforde.

== Tournament ==
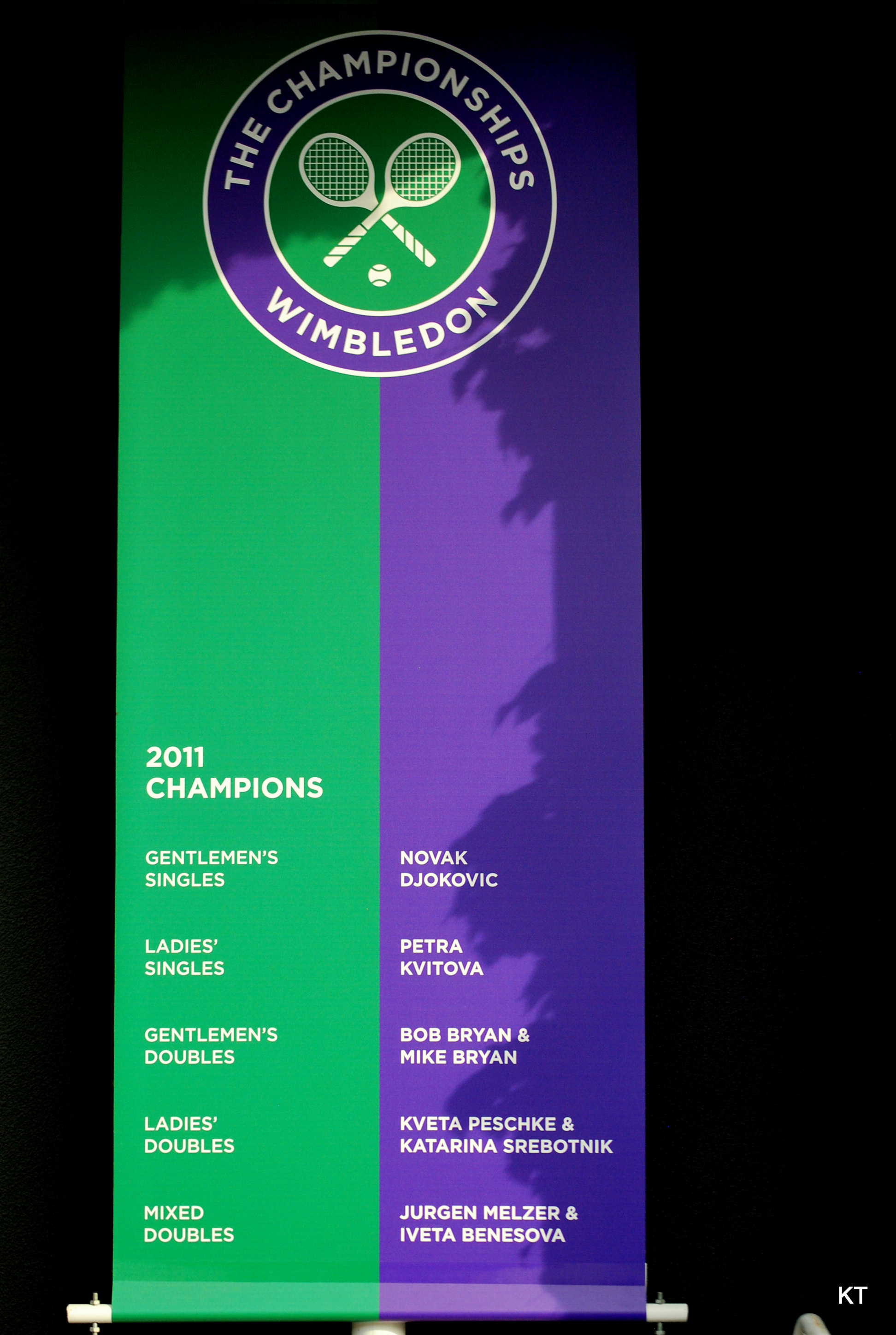
2011 Wimbledon champions

The 125th edition of the tournament saw two new courts opened. A new showcourt, Court No. 3, and a new Court No. 4 opened on the first day of the championships. Court No. 3 was opened by The Duke of Kent, President of the All England Lawn Tennis and Croquet Club, who unveiled a plaque marking the occasion. A total of 19 courts were used for competition play and a further 22 for practice. The capacity of the grounds was thus increased by 1,000 to 38,500.

On the commercial front, Sony became a sponsor of the championships for the first time, while Jacob's Creek and Lavazza replaced Blossom Hill and Nescafe as official wine and coffee of the tournament. Qualifying for all events took place at the Bank of England Sports Ground, Roehampton. The grass was of the Perennial Ryegrass type and cut to 8mm.

=== 125th anniversary ===
The 2011 championships were the 125th to be held since 1877, excluding the years 1915–1918 and 1940–1945, when the event was not held due to the two world wars. To mark the occasion a number of special events and activities occurred. Blue Peter broadcast a special programme looking at the championships, past, present and future, which was screened on the second Monday of the tournament. Four 30-minute documentaries charting the history of the championships were commissioned. A new exhibition known as the queue was held in the All England Club's Museum celebrating the people who queue each year for tickets to the championship. In addition, a range of licensed merchandise featuring the "125" logo was released; the ball boy and ball girl uniforms had this logo. The shoes provided by Fila had the words "125 years" and the logo printed on them. The balls provided by Slazenger also had "125 years" stamped onto them, and a special can design was used. Lanson champagne, which is served on the grounds, had "125 years" stamped on the bottle. Finally, to celebrate the anniversary there was a community art project in which participants were asked to "interpret" an unstrung wooden tennis racket "in a medium of their choosing".

HSBC held a series of polls on the Wimbledon website to find the 10 greatest things about the championships. The polls consisted of anything from greatest character to best final. In addition the bank also teamed up with the Sports Technology Institute at Loughborough University; to predict how tennis would develop over the next 25 years up to 2036; the 150th Wimbledon and 100 years since Fred Perry, the last British male winner of the championships, won.

== Point and prize money distribution ==
=== Point distribution ===
Below are the tables with the point distribution for each discipline of the tournament.

==== Senior points ====
Event	W	F	SF	QF	Round of 16	Round of 32	Round of 64	Round of 128	Q	Q3	Q2	Q1
Men's singles	2000	1200	720	360	180	90	45	10	25	16	8	0
Men's doubles	2000	1200	720	360	180	90	0	—N/a	25	—N/a	0	0
Women's singles	2000	1400	900	500	280	160	100	5	60	50	40	2
Women's doubles	2000	1400	900	500	280	160	5	—N/a	48	—N/a	0	0

==== Wheelchair points ====
Event	W	F	3rd	4th
Doubles	800	500	375	100

==== Junior points ====
Event	W	F	SF	QF	Round of 16	Round of 32	Q	Q3
Boys' singles	250	180	120	80	50	30	25	20
Girls' singles	250	180	120	80	50	30	25	20
Boys' doubles	180	120	80	50	30	—N/a	—N/a	—N/a
Girls' doubles	180	120	80	50	30	—N/a	—N/a	—N/a

=== Prize money ===
The total prize money for 2011 championships was £14,600,000. The winner of the men's and women's singles title earned £1,100,000.

Event	W	F	SF	QF	Round of 16	Round of 32	Round of 64	Round of 128	Q3	Q2	Q1
Singles	£1,100,000	£550,000	£275,000	£137,500	£68,750	£34,375	£20,125	£11,500	£7,000	£3,500	£1,750
Doubles*	£250,000	£125,000	£62,500	£31,250	£16,000	£9,000	£5,250	—N/a	—N/a	—N/a	—N/a
Mixed doubles*	£92,000	£46,000	£23,000	£10,500	£5,200	£2,600	£1,300	—N/a	—N/a	—N/a	—N/a
Wheelchair doubles*	£7,000	£4,000	£2,500	£1,500	—N/a	—N/a	—N/a	—N/a	—N/a	—N/a	—N/a
Invitation doubles	£17,500	£14,500	£11,500	£10,500	£9,500	—N/a	—N/a	—N/a	—N/a	—N/a	—N/a

_{* per team}

== Singles players ==
Gentlemen's singles

Champion		Runner-up	
(Serbia) Novak Djokovic [2]		(Spain) Rafael Nadal [1]	
Semifinals out
(United Kingdom) Andy Murray [4]		(France) Jo-Wilfried Tsonga [12]	
Quarterfinals out
(United States) Mardy Fish [10]	(Spain) Feliciano López	(Switzerland) Roger Federer [3]	(Australia) Bernard Tomic (Q)
4th round out
(Argentina) Juan Martín del Potro [24]	(Czech Republic) Tomáš Berdych [6]	(France) Richard Gasquet [17]	(Poland) Łukasz Kubot (Q)
(Spain) David Ferrer [7]	(Russia) Mikhail Youzhny [18]	(Belgium) Xavier Malisse	(France) Michaël Llodra [19]
3rd round out
(Luxembourg) Gilles Müller (WC)	(France) Gilles Simon [15]	(Netherlands) Robin Haase	(United States) Alex Bogomolov Jr.
(Croatia) Ivan Ljubičić	(Italy) Simone Bolelli (LL)	(France) Gaël Monfils [9]	(United States) Andy Roddick [8]
(Slovakia) Karol Beck (Q)	(Chile) Fernando González (PR)	(Spain) Nicolás Almagro [16]	(Argentina) David Nalbandian [28]
(Sweden) Robin Söderling [5]	(Austria) Jürgen Melzer [11]	(Chinese Taipei) Lu Yen-hsun	(Cyprus) Marcos Baghdatis [32]
2nd round out
(United States) Ryan Sweeting	(Canada) Milos Raonic [31]	(Belgium) Olivier Rochus	(Israel) Dudi Sela (WC)
(Uzbekistan) Denis Istomin	(Spain) Fernando Verdasco [21]	(Argentina) Juan Ignacio Chela [25]	(France) Julien Benneteau
(Germany) Tobias Kamke	(Ukraine) Sergiy Stakhovsky	(Russia) Igor Kunitsyn	(Switzerland) Stan Wawrinka [14]
(Slovenia) Grega Žemlja (LL)	(Croatia) Ivo Karlović (PR)	(Germany) Rainer Schüttler	(Romania) Victor Hănescu
(United States) Ryan Harrison (LL)	(Spain) Guillermo García López [26]	(South Africa) Rik de Voest (Q)	(Bulgaria) Grigor Dimitrov
(United States) John Isner	(India) Somdev Devvarman	(Austria) Andreas Haider-Maurer	(France) Adrian Mannarino
(Australia) Lleyton Hewitt	(Russia) Igor Andreev	(Germany) Florian Mayer [20]	(Russia) Dmitry Tursunov
(Serbia) Viktor Troicki [13]	(Brazil) Ricardo Mello	(Italy) Andreas Seppi	(South Africa) Kevin Anderson
1st round out
(United States) Michael Russell	(Spain) Pablo Andújar	(Germany) Tommy Haas (PR)	(France) Marc Gicquel (LL)
(Italy) Flavio Cipolla (Q)	(France) Kenny de Schepper (Q)	(Portugal) Frederico Gil	(France) Édouard Roger-Vasselin (Q)
(Spain) Marcel Granollers	(Germany) Philipp Kohlschreiber	(Spain) Pere Riba	(Czech Republic) Radek Štěpánek
(Australia) Marinko Matosevic (Q)	(United States) Donald Young	(Belgium) Ruben Bemelmans (Q)	(Italy) Filippo Volandri
(Spain) Daniel Gimeno Traver	(Slovenia) Blaž Kavčič	(United Kingdom) Daniel Cox (WC)	(Croatia) Marin Čilić [27]
(Colombia) Santiago Giraldo	(Netherlands) Igor Sijsling (Q)	(Austria) Martin Fischer (Q)	(Italy) Potito Starace
(Germany) Matthias Bachinger	(Slovakia) Lukáš Lacko (Q)	(France) Arnaud Clément (WC)	(Serbia) Janko Tipsarević [23]
(Brazil) Thomaz Bellucci [30]	(Germany) Michael Berrer	(Czech Republic) Jaroslav Pospíšil	(Germany) Andreas Beck (Q)
(France) Benoît Paire	(Croatia) Ivan Dodig	(Argentina) Carlos Berlocq	(Kazakhstan) Andrey Golubev
(Ukraine) Alexandr Dolgopolov [22]	(Spain) Rubén Ramírez Hidalgo	(Germany) Cedrik-Marcel Stebe (Q)	(Japan) Go Soeda (Q)
(Finland) Jarkko Nieminen	(France) Nicolas Mahut	(Germany) Denis Gremelmayr	(Argentina) Juan Mónaco
(Germany) Julian Reister	(France) Florent Serra	(Republic of Ireland) Conor Niland (Q)	(Kazakhstan) Mikhail Kukushkin
(Germany) Philipp Petzschner	(Japan) Kei Nishikori	(Russia) Teymuraz Gabashvili	(Russia) Nikolay Davydenko [29]
(United Kingdom) Dan Evans (WC)	(Germany) Mischa Zverev	(Latvia) Ernests Gulbis	(Colombia) Alejandro Falla (WC)
(Argentina) Máximo González	(Spain) Tommy Robredo	(Canada) Frank Dancevic (Q)	(United Kingdom) James Ward (WC)
(United States) James Blake	(Spain) Albert Montañés	(Ukraine) Illya Marchenko	(France) Jérémy Chardy

Ladies' singles

Champion		Runner-up	
(Czech Republic) Petra Kvitová [8]		(Russia) Maria Sharapova [5]	
Semifinals out
(Germany) Sabine Lisicki (WC)		(Belarus) Victoria Azarenka [4]	
Quarterfinals out
(Slovakia) Dominika Cibulková [24]	(France) Marion Bartoli [9]	(Austria) Tamira Paszek	(Bulgaria) Tsvetana Pironkova [32]
4th round out
(Denmark) Caroline Wozniacki [1]	(China) Peng Shuai [20]	(Czech Republic) Petra Cetkovská	(United States) Serena Williams [7]
(Russia) Ksenia Pervak	(Russia) Nadia Petrova	(Belgium) Yanina Wickmayer [19]	(United States) Venus Williams [23]
3rd round out
(Australia) Jarmila Gajdošová [27]	(Germany) Julia Görges [16]	(Hungary) Melinda Czink (PR)	(Czech Republic) Klára Zakopalová
(Japan) Misaki Doi (Q)	(Serbia) Ana Ivanovic [18]	(Italy) Flavia Pennetta [21]	(Russia) Maria Kirilenko [26]
(Italy) Francesca Schiavone [6]	(Germany) Andrea Petkovic [13]	(Ukraine) Kateryna Bondarenko	(Slovakia) Daniela Hantuchová [25]
(Italy) Roberta Vinci [29]	(Russia) Svetlana Kuznetsova [12]	(Spain) María José Martínez Sánchez	(Russia) Vera Zvonareva [2]
2nd round out
(France) Virginie Razzano	(Czech Republic) Andrea Hlaváčková	(Slovenia) Polona Hercog	(France) Mathilde Johansson
(Belarus) Anastasiya Yakimova	(United Kingdom) Elena Baltacha	(Czech Republic) Lucie Šafářová [31]	(United Kingdom) Laura Robson (WC)
(China) Li Na [3]	(China) Zheng Jie	(Greece) Eleni Daniilidou (WC)	(Poland) Agnieszka Radwańska [13]
(Spain) Lourdes Domínguez Lino	(Russia) Evgeniya Rodina	(Thailand) Tamarine Tanasugarn (Q)	(Romania) Simona Halep
(Czech Republic) Barbora Záhlavová-Strýcová	(United States) Christina McHale	(France) Pauline Parmentier	(Canada) Stéphanie Dubois (LL)
(Russia) Anastasia Pavlyuchenkova [14]	(Italy) Sara Errani	(New Zealand) Marina Erakovic (Q)	(Czech Republic) Iveta Benešová
(United Kingdom) Anne Keothavong	(Canada) Rebecca Marino	(Georgia (country)) Anna Tatishvili	(Romania) Alexandra Dulgheru
(Romania) Monica Niculescu	(Japan) Kimiko Date-Krumm	(Croatia) Petra Martić	(Russia) Elena Vesnina
1st round out
(Spain) Arantxa Parra Santonja	(India) Sania Mirza	(Australia) Anastasia Rodionova	(Ukraine) Alona Bondarenko
(Croatia) Mirjana Lučić	(Sweden) Johanna Larsson	(United Kingdom) Heather Watson (WC)	(Spain) Anabel Medina Garrigues
(Australia) Samantha Stosur [10]	(Sweden) Sofia Arvidsson	(Germany) Mona Barthel (Q)	(Belgium) Kirsten Flipkens
(Czech Republic) Lucie Hradecká	(United Kingdom) Emily Webley-Smith (WC)	(Germany) Angelique Kerber	(Russia) Anna Chakvetadze
(Russia) Alla Kudryavtseva	(Latvia) Anastasija Sevastova	(Czech Republic) Zuzana Ondrášková	(United States) Bethanie Mattek-Sands [30]
(United States) Melanie Oudin	(United States) CoCo Vandeweghe	(Germany) Kristina Barrois	(Belarus) Olga Govortsova
(Czech Republic) Kristýna Plíšková (Q)	(Italy) Romina Oprandi	(South Africa) Chanelle Scheepers	(Romania) Irina-Camelia Begu
(Italy) Alberta Brianti	(Kazakhstan) Yaroslava Shvedova	(Serbia) Bojana Jovanovski	(France) Aravane Rezaï
(Australia) Jelena Dokic	(Canada) Aleksandra Wozniak (Q)	(Japan) Ayumi Morita	(Russia) Ekaterina Makarova [28]
(Israel) Shahar Pe'er [22]	(Romania) Sorana Cîrstea	(United States) Irina Falconi (Q)	(France) Stéphanie Foretz Gacon (LL)
(Ukraine) Lesia Tsurenko (Q)	(Russia) Vesna Dolonc	(France) Alizé Cornet	(Estonia) Kaia Kanepi [17]
(Russia) Vitalia Diatchenko (Q)	(Chinese Taipei) Chang Kai-chen (Q)	(Czech Republic) Sandra Záhlavová	(Slovakia) Magdaléna Rybáriková
(United States) Alexa Glatch (Q)	(United Kingdom) Naomi Broady (WC)	(Austria) Patricia Mayr-Achleitner	(Russia) Vera Dushevina
(United States) Varvara Lepchenko	(Russia) Anastasia Pivovarova	(United States) Jill Craybas	(China) Zhang Shuai
(Serbia) Jelena Janković [15]	(Austria) Sybille Bammer	(United Kingdom) Katie O'Brien (WC)	(Uzbekistan) Akgul Amanmuradova
(Italy) Camila Giorgi (Q)	(United States) Vania King	(Spain) Laura Pous Tió	(United States) Alison Riske

== Champions ==
=== Seniors ===
==== Men's singles ====
(Serbia) Novak Djokovic def. (Spain) Rafael Nadal, 6–4, 6–1, 1–6, 6–3

- It was Djokovic's 8th title of the year and 26th of his career. It was his 2nd slam of the year and 3rd of his career. It was his first Wimbledon title.

==== Women's singles ====
(Czech Republic) Petra Kvitová def. (Russia) Maria Sharapova, 6–3, 6–4

- It was Kvitová's first Major title, 4th title of the year, and 5th title of her career. She was also the first Grand Slam tournament champion of either gender to be born in the 1990s.

==== Men's doubles ====
(United States) Bob Bryan / (United States) Mike Bryan def. (Sweden) Robert Lindstedt / (Romania) Horia Tecău, 6–3, 6–4, 7–6^{(7–2)}

- It was the Bryan brothers's second Wimbledon title, 6th title of the year, and 73rd title as a team. With this title they equalled the Woodies' Open era record of 11 men's Grand Slam doubles titles.

==== Women's doubles ====
(Czech Republic) Květa Peschke / (Slovenia) Katarina Srebotnik def. (Germany) Sabine Lisicki / (Australia) Samantha Stosur, 6–3, 6–1

- It was Peschke's first Wimbledon title, 4th title of the year, and 20th title of her career. It was Srebotnik's first Wimbledon title, 3rd title of the year, and 27th title of her career.

==== Mixed doubles ====
(Austria) Jürgen Melzer / (Czech Republic) Iveta Benešová def. (India) Mahesh Bhupathi / (Russia) Elena Vesnina, 6–3, 6–2

=== Juniors ===
==== Boys' singles ====
(Australia) Luke Saville def. (United Kingdom) Liam Broady, 2–6, 6–4, 6–2

==== Girls' singles ====
(Australia) Ashleigh Barty def. (Russia) Irina Khromacheva, 7–5, 7–6^{(7–3)}

==== Boys' doubles ====
(United Kingdom) George Morgan / (Croatia) Mate Pavić def. (United Kingdom) Oliver Golding / (Czech Republic) Jiří Veselý, 3–6, 6–4, 7–5

==== Girls' doubles ====
(Canada) Eugenie Bouchard / (United States) Grace Min def. (Netherlands) Demi Schuurs / (China) Tang Haochen, 5–7, 6–2, 7–5

=== Invitation ===
==== Gentlemen's invitation doubles ====
(Netherlands) Jacco Eltingh / (Netherlands) Paul Haarhuis def. (Sweden) Jonas Björkman / (Australia) Todd Woodbridge, 3–6, 6–3, [13–11]

==== Ladies' invitation doubles ====
(United States) Lindsay Davenport / (Switzerland) Martina Hingis def. (United States) Martina Navratilova / (Czech Republic) Jana Novotná, 6–4, 6–4

==== Senior gentlemen's invitation doubles ====
(Australia) Pat Cash / (Australia) Mark Woodforde def. (United Kingdom) Jeremy Bates / (Sweden) Anders Järryd, 6–3, 5–7, [10–5]

=== Wheelchair ===
==== Wheelchair men's doubles ====
(Netherlands) Maikel Scheffers / (Netherlands) Ronald Vink def. (France) Stéphane Houdet / (France) Michaël Jérémiasz, 7–5, 6–2

==== Wheelchair women's doubles ====
(Netherlands) Esther Vergeer / (Netherlands) Sharon Walraven def. (Netherlands) Jiske Griffioen / (Netherlands) Aniek van Koot, 6–4, 3–6, 7–5

== Broadcast ==
The 2011 tournament was broadcast in 185 countries. The BBC was the host broadcaster and, since the All England Club had made a deal with Sony, some of the tournament was broadcast in 3D for the first time. To mark the 125th anniversary, the BBC broadcast a documentary the night before the start of the tournament (19 June 2011), called 125 years of Wimbledon: You Cannot Be Serious, looking back at memorable moments.

In the United States, the championship matches aired on NBC for the 43rd and final year. The network issued a statement saying it had been outbid for the rights to future broadcasts. Cable sports channel ESPN, which had already been sharing Wimbledon coverage with NBC, became the exclusive American broadcaster of the tournament for a 12-year period, beginning in 2012. Under the agreement, all matches were to air live, as opposed to tape delaying some matches, a practice for which NBC had been criticised.

== Attendance ==
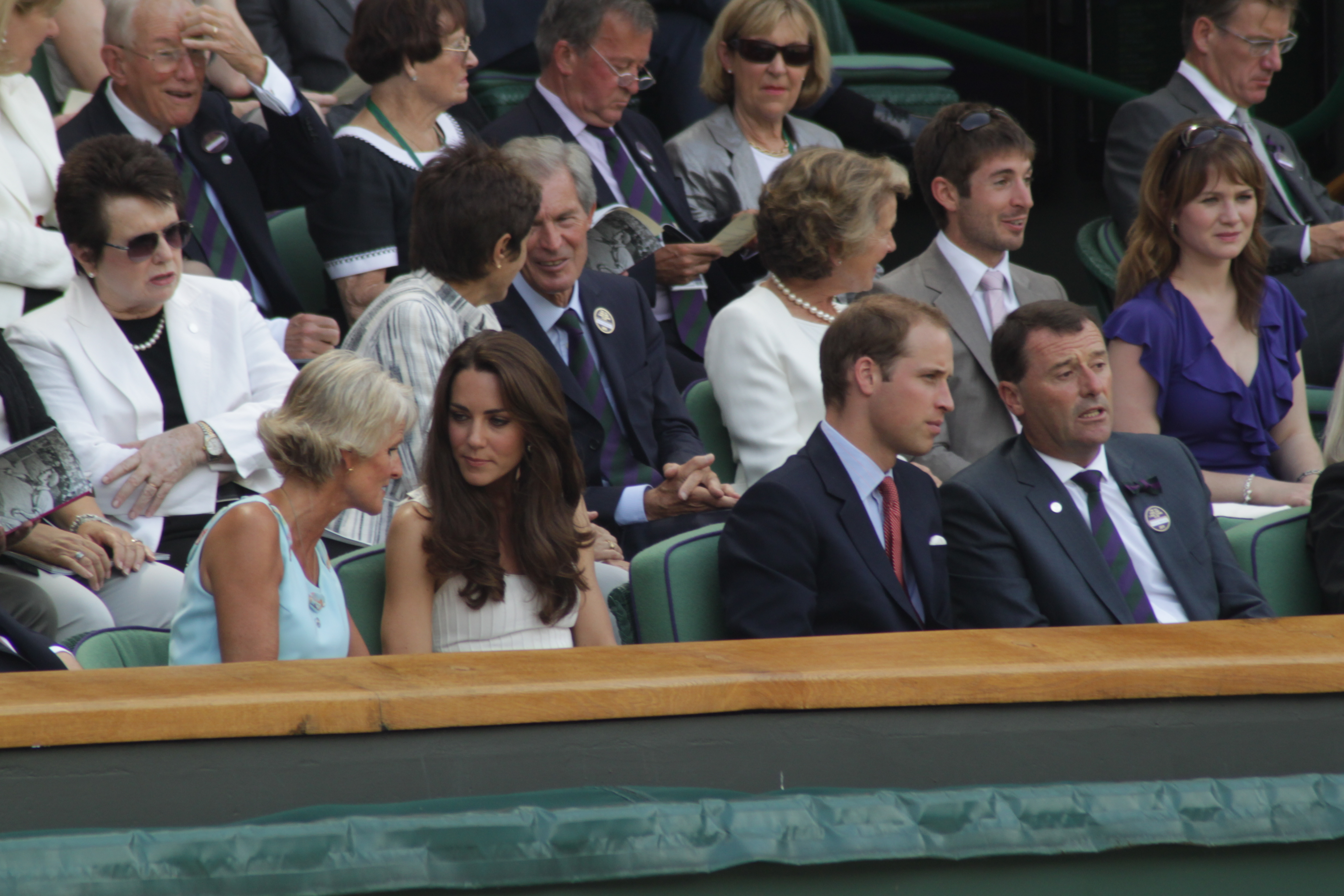
Duke and Duchess of Cambridge watching the action from the Royal box of Centre Court

Members of the British royal family attended the championships. With the Duchess of Cornwall (Camilla) attending the tournament on the first Wednesday, on official duty, where she met six ball boys and girls before watching the days play on Centre court from the Royal box. While on the second Monday, the Duke and Duchess of Cambridge (Prince William and Catherine) attended the championships, while on a private visit. The pair took in all three matches on Centre Court. After the first match, which was won by British player Andy Murray, the pair briefly met him, after the Scot bowed towards them while on court at the end of the match.

On the second Monday temperatures topped 30 degrees, and a total of 146 patrons needed medical assistance by 16:30, due to the heat. This was a significant rise compared to other days as in the two previous days of the championships 90 and 87 people were treated respectively.

== Protests ==
On the middle Saturday, 14 people were arrested at the gate when trying to obtain access to the grounds. The All England Club shut the gates of the ground forcing spectators who had camped overnight to wait outside for 45 minutes before letting them in at 11.15 am. The group wore yellow shirts and had paint and other equipment to make banners once inside of the ground. A source stated that the group were planning to demonstrate against government policy.

== Singles seeds ==
The following are the seeded players and notable players who withdrew from the event. Seedings are based on ATP and WTA rankings as of 13 June 2011. Rankings and points are as of before 20 June 2011.

=== Men's singles ===
The Men's singles seeds is arranged on a surface-based system to reflect more accurately the individual player's grass court achievement as per the following formula:

- ATP Entry System Position points as at a week before The Championships
- Add 100% points earned for all grass court tournaments in the past 12 months
- add 75% points earned for best grass court tournament in the 12 months before that.

Seed	Rank	Player	Points before	Points defending	Points won	Points after	Status
1	1	(Spain) Rafael Nadal	12,070	2,000	1,200	11,270	Runner-up, lost to (Serbia) Novak Djokovic [2]
2	2	(Serbia) Novak Djokovic	12,005	720	2,000	13,285	Champion, defeated (Spain) Rafael Nadal [1]
3	3	(Switzerland) Roger Federer	9,230	360	360	9,230	Quarterfinals lost to (France) Jo-Wilfried Tsonga [12]
4	4	(United Kingdom) Andy Murray	6,855	720	720	6,855	Semifinals lost to (Spain) Rafael Nadal [1]
5	5	(Sweden) Robin Söderling	4,595	360	90	4,325	Third round lost to (Australia) Bernard Tomic (Q)
6	7	(Czech Republic) Tomáš Berdych	3,490	1,200	180	2,470	Fourth round lost to (United States) Mardy Fish [10]
7	6	(Spain) David Ferrer	4,150	180	180	4,150	Fourth round lost to (France) Jo-Wilfried Tsonga [12]
8	10	(United States) Andy Roddick	2,200	180	90	2,110	Third round lost to (Spain) Feliciano López
9	8	(France) Gaël Monfils	2,780	90	90	2,780	Third round lost to (Poland) Łukasz Kubot (Q)
10	9	(United States) Mardy Fish	2,335	45	360	2,650	Quarterfinals lost (Spain) Rafael Nadal [1]
11	11	(Austria) Jürgen Melzer	2,175	180	90	2,085	Third round lost to (Belgium) Xavier Malisse
12	19	(France) Jo-Wilfried Tsonga	1,585	360	720	1,945	Semifinals lost to (Serbia) Novak Djokovic [2]
13	12	(Serbia) Viktor Troicki	1,930	45	45	1,930	Second round lost to (Chinese Taipei) Lu Yen-hsun
14	14	(Switzerland) Stan Wawrinka	1,900	10	45	1,935	Second round lost to (Italy) Simone Bolelli (LL)
15	16	(France) Gilles Simon	1,745	90	90	1,745	Third round lost to (Argentina) Juan Martín del Potro [24]
16	15	(Spain) Nicolás Almagro	1,875	10	90	1,955	Third round lost to (Russia) Mikhail Youzhny [18]
17	13	(France) Richard Gasquet	1,925	0	180	2,105	Fourth round lost to (United Kingdom) Andy Murray [4]
18	17	(Russia) Mikhail Youzhny	1,740	45	180	1,875	Fourth round lost to (Switzerland) Roger Federer [3]
19	35	(France) Michaël Llodra	1,195	45	180	1,330	Fourth round lost vs (Serbia) Novak Djokovic [2]
20	18	(Germany) Florian Mayer	1,600	90	45	1,555	Second round lost to (Belgium) Xavier Malisse
21	22	(Spain) Fernando Verdasco	1,425	10	45	1,460	Second round lost to (Netherlands) Robin Haase
22	24	(Ukraine) Alexandr Dolgopolov	1,405	45	10	1,370	First round lost to (Chile) Fernando González (PR)
23	29	(Serbia) Janko Tipsarević	1,305	10	10	1,305	First round lost to (Croatia) Ivo Karlović
24	21	(Argentina) Juan Martín del Potro	1,445	0	180	1,625	Fourth round lost to (Spain) Rafael Nadal [1]
25	20	(Argentina) Juan Ignacio Chela	1,475	10	45	1,505	Second round lost to (United States) Alex Bogomolov Jr.
26	41	(Spain) Guillermo García López	1,120	10	45	1,155	Second round lost to (Slovakia) Karol Beck (Q)
27	26	(Croatia) Marin Čilić	1,345	10	10	1,345	First round lost to (Croatia) Ivan Ljubičić
28	23	(Argentina) David Nalbandian	1,425	0	90	1,515	Third round lost to (Switzerland) Roger Federer [3]
29	27	(Russia) Nikolay Davydenko	1,330	45	10	1,295	First round lost to (Australia) Bernard Tomic (Q)
30	28	(Brazil) Thomaz Bellucci	1,305	90	10	1,225	First round lost to (Germany) Rainer Schüttler
31	25	(Canada) Milos Raonic	1,354	0	45	1,399	Second round lost to (Luxembourg) Gilles Müller (WC)
32	30	(Cyprus) Marcos Baghdatis	1,295	10	90	1,375	Third round lost to (Serbia) Novak Djokovic [2]

=== Women's singles ===
For the Women's singles seeds, the seeding order follows the ranking list, except where in the opinion of the committee, the grass court credentials of a particular player necessitates a change in the interest of achieving a balanced draw.

Seed	Rank	Player	Points before	Points defending	Points won	Points after	Status
1	1	(Denmark) Caroline Wozniacki	9,915	280	280	9,915	Fourth round lost to (Slovakia) Dominika Cibulková [24]
2	3	(Russia) Vera Zvonareva	7,935	1,400	160	6,695	Third round lost to (Bulgaria) Tsvetana Pironkova [32]
3	4	(China) Li Na	6,255	500	100	5,855	Second round lost to (Germany) Sabine Lisicki (WC)
4	5	(Belarus) Victoria Azarenka	5,725	160	900	6,465	Semifinals lost to (Czech Republic) Petra Kvitová [8]
5	6	(Russia) Maria Sharapova	5,021	280	1,400	6,141	Runner-up, lost to (Czech Republic) Petra Kvitová [8]
6	7	(Italy) Francesca Schiavone	4,705	5	160	4,860	Third round lost to (Austria) Tamira Paszek
7^{†}	25	(United States) Serena Williams	2,060	2,000	280	340	Fourth round lost to (France) Marion Bartoli [9]
8	8	(Czech Republic) Petra Kvitová	4,337	900	2,000	5,437	Champion, defeated (Russia) Maria Sharapova [5]
9	9	(France) Marion Bartoli	4,010	280	500	4,230	Quarterfinals lost to (Germany) Sabine Lisicki (WC)
10	10	(Australia) Samantha Stosur	3,405	5	5	3,405	First round lost to (Hungary) Melinda Czink (PR)
11	13	(Germany) Andrea Petkovic	3,150	5	160	3,305	Third round lost to (Russia) Ksenia Pervak
12	12	(Russia) Svetlana Kuznetsova	3,160	100	160	3,220	Third round lost to (Belgium) Yanina Wickmayer [19]
13	11	(Poland) Agnieszka Radwańska	3,175	280	100	2,995	Second round lost to (Czech Republic) Petra Cetkovská
14	14	(Russia) Anastasia Pavlyuchenkova	3,055	160	100	2,995	Second round lost to (Russia) Nadia Petrova
15	15	(Serbia) Jelena Janković	3,050	280	5	2,775	First round lost to (Spain) María José Martínez Sánchez
16	16	(Germany) Julia Görges	2,560	5	160	2,715	Third round lost to (Slovakia) Dominika Cibulková [24]
17	17	(Estonia) Kaia Kanepi	2,466	500	5	1,971	First round lost to (Italy) Sara Errani
18	18	(Serbia) Ana Ivanovic	2,400	5	160	2,555	Third round lost to (Czech Republic) Petra Cetkovská
19	19	(Belgium) Yanina Wickmayer	2,350	160	280	2,470	Fourth round lost to (Czech Republic) Petra Kvitová [8]
20	20	(China) Peng Shuai	2,300	0	280	2,580	Fourth round lost to (Russia) Maria Sharapova [5]
21	21	(Italy) Flavia Pennetta	2,220	160	160	2,220	Third round lost to (France) Marion Bartoli [9]
22	22	(Israel) Shahar Pe'er	2,170	100	5	2,075	First round lost to (Russia) Ksenia Pervak
23	30	(United States) Venus Williams	1,680	500	280	1,460	Fourth round lost to (Bulgaria) Tsvetana Pironkova [32]
24	24	(Slovakia) Dominika Cibulková	2,115	160	500	2,455	Quarterfinals lost to (Russia) Maria Sharapova [5]
25	23	(Slovakia) Daniela Hantuchová	2,135	100	160	2,195	Third round lost to (Belarus) Victoria Azarenka [4]
26	27	(Russia) Maria Kirilenko	1,985	160	160	1,985	Third round lost to (United States) Serena Williams [7]
27	28	(Australia) Jarmila Gajdošová	1,940	280	160	1,820	Third round lost to (Denmark) Caroline Wozniacki [1]
28	38	(Russia) Ekaterina Makarova	1,381	100	5	1,286	First round lost to (United States) Christina McHale
29	29	(Italy) Roberta Vinci	1,925	100	160	1,985	Third round lost to (Czech Republic) Petra Kvitová [8]
30	31	(United States) Bethanie Mattek-Sands	1,643	5	5	1,643	First round lost to (Japan) Misaki Doi (Q)
31	32	(Czech Republic) Lucie Šafářová	1,585	5	100	1,680	Second round lost to (Czech Republic) Klára Zakopalová
32	33	(Bulgaria) Tsvetana Pironkova	1,551	900	500	1,151	Quarterfinals lost to (Czech Republic) Petra Kvitová [8]

†Serena Williams was ranked 26 on the day when seeds were announced. Nevertheless, she was deemed a special case and seeded 7th by the organizers because she missed a significant portion of the last 12-month period due to knee injury.

The following players would have been seeded, but they withdrew from the event.

Rank	Player	Points before	Points defending	Points after	Withdrawal reason
2	(Belgium) Kim Clijsters	8,125	500	7,625	Foot injury
26	(Russia) Alisa Kleybanova	2,005	160	1,845	Illness

== Main draw wild card entries ==
The following players received wild cards into the main draw senior events.

=== Men's singles ===
1. (France) Arnaud Clément
2. (United Kingdom) Daniel Cox
3. (United Kingdom) Dan Evans
4. (Colombia) Alejandro Falla
5. (Luxembourg) Gilles Müller
6. (Israel) Dudi Sela
7. (United Kingdom) James Ward

=== Women's singles ===
1. (United Kingdom) Naomi Broady
2. (Greece) Eleni Daniilidou
3. (Germany) Sabine Lisicki
4. (United Kingdom) Katie O'Brien
5. (United Kingdom) Laura Robson
6. (United Kingdom) Heather Watson
7. (United Kingdom) Emily Webley-Smith

=== Men's doubles ===
1. (United Kingdom) Daniel Cox / (United Kingdom) James Ward
2. (United Kingdom) Jamie Delgado / (United Kingdom) Jonathan Marray
3. (United Kingdom) Chris Eaton / (United Kingdom) Josh Goodall
4. (United Kingdom) Colin Fleming / (United Kingdom) Ross Hutchins
5. (Australia) Lleyton Hewitt / (Australia) Peter Luczak

=== Women's doubles ===
1. (United Kingdom) Sarah Borwell / (United Kingdom) Melanie South
2. (United Kingdom) Naomi Broady / (United Kingdom) Emily Webley-Smith
3. (United Kingdom) Anne Keothavong / (United Kingdom) Laura Robson
4. (United Kingdom) Jocelyn Rae / (United Kingdom) Heather Watson

=== Mixed doubles ===
1. (United Kingdom) Jamie Delgado / (United Kingdom) Melanie South
2. (United Kingdom) Colin Fleming / (United Kingdom) Jocelyn Rae
3. (United Kingdom) Ross Hutchins / (United Kingdom) Heather Watson
4. (United Kingdom) Jonathan Marray / (United Kingdom) Anne Keothavong
5. (United Kingdom) Ken Skupski / (United Kingdom) Elena Baltacha

== Protected ranking ==
The following players were accepted directly into the main draw using a protected ranking:

Men's Singles

- (Chile) Fernando González
- (Germany) Tommy Haas
- (Croatia) Ivo Karlović

Women's Singles

- (Hungary) Melinda Czink

== Qualifiers entries ==
Below are the lists of the qualifiers entering in the main draws.

=== Men's singles ===
Men's singles qualifiers

1. (Germany) Andreas Beck
2. (Slovakia) Karol Beck
3. (Belgium) Ruben Bemelmans
4. (Italy) Flavio Cipolla
5. (Canada) Frank Dancevic
6. (France) Kenny de Schepper
7. (South Africa) Rik de Voest
8. (Austria) Martin Fischer
9. (Poland) Łukasz Kubot
10. (Slovakia) Lukáš Lacko
11. (Australia) Marinko Matosevic
12. (Republic of Ireland) Conor Niland
13. (France) Édouard Roger-Vasselin
14. (Netherlands) Igor Sijsling
15. (Germany) Cedrik-Marcel Stebe
16. (Australia) Bernard Tomic

Lucky losers

1. (Italy) Simone Bolelli
2. (France) Marc Gicquel
3. (United States) Ryan Harrison
4. (Japan) Go Soeda
5. (Slovenia) Grega Žemlja

=== Women's singles ===
Women's singles qualifiers

1. (Germany) Mona Barthel
2. (Chinese Taipei) Chang Kai-chen
3. (Russia) Vitalia Diatchenko
4. (Japan) Misaki Doi
5. (New Zealand) Marina Erakovic
6. (United States) Irina Falconi
7. (Italy) Camila Giorgi
8. (United States) Alexa Glatch
9. (Czech Republic) Kristýna Plíšková
10. (Thailand) Tamarine Tanasugarn
11. (Ukraine) Lesia Tsurenko
12. (Canada) Aleksandra Wozniak

Lucky losers

1. (Canada) Stéphanie Dubois
2. (France) Stéphanie Foretz Gacon

=== Men's doubles ===
Men's doubles qualifiers

1. (Slovakia) Karol Beck / (Czech Republic) David Škoch
2. (United States) Ryan Harrison / (United States) Travis Rettenmaier
3. (Philippines) Treat Huey / (South Africa) Izak van der Merwe
4. (United Kingdom) David Rice / (United Kingdom) Sean Thornley

Lucky losers

1. (Italy) Flavio Cipolla / (Italy) Paolo Lorenzi
2. (Czech Republic) Leoš Friedl / (United States) David Martin
3. (Slovakia) Lukáš Lacko / (Czech Republic) Lukáš Rosol
4. (Italy) Alessandro Motti / (France) Stéphane Robert
5. (Thailand) Sanchai Ratiwatana / (Thailand) Sonchat Ratiwatana

=== Women's doubles ===
Women's doubles qualifiers

1. (Japan) Shuko Aoyama / (Japan) Rika Fujiwara
2. (Russia) Vesna Dolonc / (Hungary) Katalin Marosi
3. (United States) Lindsay Lee-Waters / (United States) Megan Moulton-Levy
4. (Poland) Urszula Radwańska / (Russia) Arina Rodionova

Lucky losers

1. (New Zealand) Marina Erakovic / (Thailand) Tamarine Tanasugarn
2. (France) Sophie Lefèvre / (Russia) Evgeniya Rodina
3. (Thailand) Noppawan Lertcheewakarn / (Australia) Jessica Moore

== Withdrawals ==
The following players were accepted directly into the main tournament, but withdrew with injuries or personal reasons.

Men's Singles

- (Germany) Benjamin Becker → replaced by (Japan) Go Soeda
- (Lithuania) Ričardas Berankis → replaced by (France) Florent Serra
- (Uruguay) Pablo Cuevas → replaced by (United States) Ryan Harrison
- (Netherlands) Thiemo de Bakker → replaced by (Germany) Denis Gremelmayr
- (Spain) Juan Carlos Ferrero → replaced by (Russia) Igor Andreev
- (Italy) Fabio Fognini → replaced by (France) Marc Gicquel
- (United States) Robert Kendrick → replaced by (Slovenia) Grega Žemlja
- (France) Paul-Henri Mathieu → replaced by (United States) James Blake
- (United States) Sam Querrey → replaced by (Italy) Simone Bolelli

Women's Singles

- (Hungary) Gréta Arn → replaced by (France) Stéphanie Foretz Gacon
- (Switzerland) Timea Bacsinszky → replaced by (Ukraine) Kateryna Bondarenko
- (Belgium) Kim Clijsters → replaced by (Canada) Stéphanie Dubois
- (Argentina) Gisela Dulko → replaced by (Belarus) Olga Govortsova
- (Russia) Alisa Kleybanova → replaced by (Austria) Patricia Mayr-Achleitner
- (Russia) Dinara Safina → replaced by (Russia) Vesna Dolonc
- (Switzerland) Patty Schnyder → replaced by (Belarus) Anastasiya Yakimova
- (Hungary) Ágnes Szávay → replaced by (France) Pauline Parmentier

Preceded by 2011 French Open	Grand Slam tournaments	Succeeded by 2011 US Open
