= David Kotyza =

Czech tennis coach

David Kotyza (born 30 August 1967 in Plzeň) is a Czech tennis coach, best known for his work with dual Wimbledon champion Petra Kvitová and the Czech Republic Fed Cup team.

== Coaching career ==
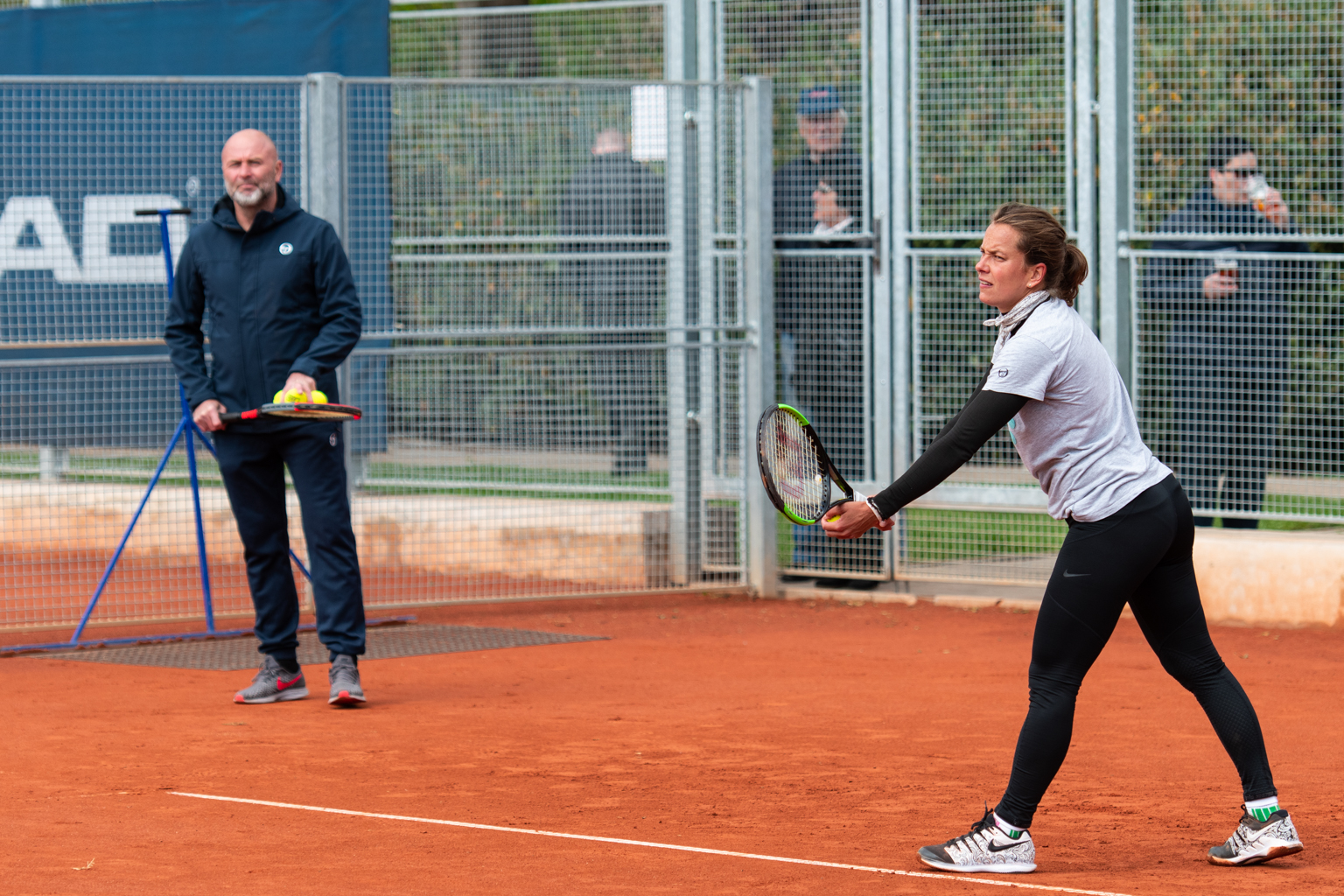
David Kotyza leads the training of Barbora Strýcová at the 2019 Prague Open

Kotyza started coaching Petra Kvitová in November 2008; by this time, Kvitová had entered the World's Top 50 and had already reached the round of 16 of the 2008 French Open in what was her first appearance in the main draw of a Grand Slam tournament.

Under Kotyza, Kvitová continued to make gradual progress on the WTA Tour and in May 2011 she reached the world's top ten for the first time, by virtue of winning the Mutua Madrid Open. This was followed by a breakthrough first Grand Slam title at Wimbledon, where she defeated Maria Sharapova in the final to become the first Czech player since Jana Novotná to win a title at this level, and the prestigious 2011 WTA Tour Championships at the end of the season. In twelve months, Kvitová had gone from World No. 34 at the end of 2010 to achieving a career high rank of No. 2 at the end of 2011.

Kotyza has overseen all but one of Kvitová's seventeen career titles that she had won during their partnership, having missed her WTA title in Dubai in 2013 due to being on an overseas vacation.

Kotyza was also a head coach of the Czech Republic Fed Cup team but stepped down in 2012 to focus on coaching Kvitová. In January 2016, Kotyza and Kvitová parted ways. Kotyza coached Caroline Wozniacki from April to August 2016. From December 2016 to September 2017 he coached Karolína Plíšková. They split after 2017 US Open. From March 2020 to September 2022 he coached Karolína Muchová. Currently, Kotyza is co-coach of WTA No. 25 player Linda Nosková, along with Tomáš Krupa.
