= Petra Kvitová =

Czech tennis player (born 1990)

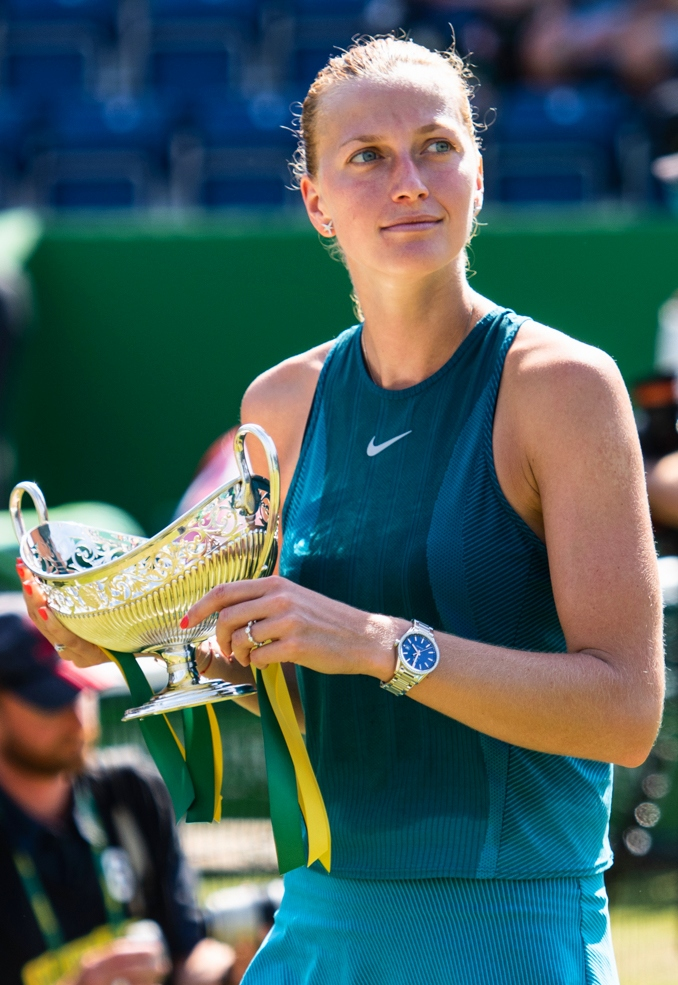
- Kvitová with the winner's trophy at the 2018 Birmingham Classic
- Country (sports): Czech Republic
- Residence: Monte Carlo, Monaco
- Born: 8 March 1990 (age 36) Bílovec, Czechoslovakia (now Czech Republic)
- Height: 1.82 m (6 ft 0 in)
- Turned pro: 2006
- Retired: 25 August 2025
- Plays: Left-handed (two-handed backhand)
- Coach: David Kotyza (2008–2016); František Čermák (2016); Jiří Vaněk (2016–2025)
- Prize money: US$37,653,615: 8th all-time in earnings
- Official website: petrakvitova.net

Singles
- Career record: 634–296
- Career titles: 31
- Highest ranking: No. 2 (31 October 2011)

Grand Slam singles results
- Australian Open: F (2019)
- French Open: SF (2012, 2020)
- Wimbledon: W (2011, 2014)
- US Open: QF (2015, 2017)

Other tournaments
- Tour Finals: W (2011)
- Olympic Games: Bronze (2016)

Doubles
- Career record: 13–35
- Career titles: 0
- Highest ranking: No. 196 (28 February 2011)

Grand Slam doubles results
- Australian Open: 2R (2011)
- French Open: 2R (2010)
- Wimbledon: 1R (2008, 2010, 2011)
- US Open: 1R (2008, 2009, 2010)

Team competitions
- Fed Cup: W (2011, 2012, 2014, 2015, 2016, 2018); Record 30–11
- Hopman Cup: W (2012)
Medal record
Women's tennis
Representing Czech Republic
Olympic Games
Bronze medal – third place	2016 Rio de Janeiro	Singles

Petra Kvitová (Czech: [ˈpɛtra ˈkvɪtovaː]; born 8 March 1990) is a Czech former professional tennis player. Known for her powerful left-handed groundstrokes and variety, Kvitová won 31 WTA Tour-level career singles titles, including two major titles at Wimbledon in 2011 and 2014. She also won the 2011 WTA Championships, and claimed a bronze medal in singles representing the Czech Republic at the 2016 Rio Olympics. Her career-high ranking of world No. 2 was achieved on 31 October 2011.

Kvitová first gained notice by defeating then-world No. 1 Dinara Safina in the third round of the 2009 US Open. This was followed by her first major semifinal appearance at the 2010 Wimbledon Championships. Then, during her breakthrough season in 2011, Kvitová won her first major title at Wimbledon over Maria Sharapova in the final, becoming the first player of either gender born in the 1990s to win a major. At the end of the season, she won the WTA Championships on her debut. She also led the Czech Republic to victory in the Fed Cup that same year, the country's first such title as an independent nation.

In 2012, Kvitová reached the semifinals of the Australian and French Opens, and was crowned the US Open Series champion. That same year, she also won the Hopman Cup alongside Tomáš Berdych. In 2014, she won her second major title at Wimbledon, defeating Eugenie Bouchard in the final. In 2015, Kvitová completed the feat of reaching at least the quarterfinals of all four majors after her quarterfinal debut at the US Open. In 2016, she won the WTA Elite Trophy on her debut, thus becoming the first player ever to win both categories of year-end championships on debut.

Kvitová was sidelined with injury in the first-half of 2017 following a knife attack during the off-season in 2016. In 2019, she reached her first major final in almost five years, at the Australian Open, finishing runner-up to Naomi Osaka. She retired from the sport in 2025.

== Early life ==
Petra Kvitová was born to Jiří Kvita, a mayor and former school teacher, and Pavla Kvitová in Bílovec, Czechoslovakia (now Czech Republic). She has two elder brothers. Her father Jiří introduced her to tennis. During her childhood, she admired Czech American player Martina Navratilova. Kvitová trained in her Moravian hometown, Fulnek, until the age of 16, and was then encouraged by an instructor to pursue a professional career in tennis. She was coached by David Kotyza from November 2008 until January 2016.

== Career ==
=== 2006–2010: Career beginnings, first title and ascendancy ===
As a junior, Kvitová achieved a career-high ranking of world No. 27 on 9 July 2007. She also amassed a 35–7 and 20–9 record in singles and doubles respectively. Her lone Grand Slam tournament appearance as a junior came at the 2007 Wimbledon Championships. In singles, eighth-seeded Kvitová advanced to the last 16, after beating Jocelyn Rae and Malena Gordo before losing to eventual semifinalist Katarzyna Piter in straight sets. In doubles, she played alongside fellow Czech Kateřina Vaňková but they fell at the first hurdle to Mariana Duque Mariño and Michelle Larcher de Brito.

Kvitová first attempted to qualify for a WTA tournament at the 2007 Prague Open, but she lost in the second round of qualifying to Ekaterina Ivanova. She then made her debut in the main draw of a WTA event at the 2007 Nordic Light Open, where she lost in the first round to Marta Domachowska in three sets. Throughout 2006 and 2007, Kvitová captured six ITF singles titles, four of which came in her home nation. She also made her Fed Cup debut in 2007, playing alongside Barbora Strýcová in doubles, where they lost to the Spanish team of Nuria Llagostera Vives and Virginia Ruano Pascual.

Kvitová began 2008 by upsetting Anabel Medina Garrigues in her opening match in Paris for her first ever WTA main-draw victory before falling to fourth seed Elena Dementieva. Then, she racked up her first ever top-10 win by beating world No. 8 and defending champion, Venus Williams in the first round in Memphis. In April, she played her first Fed Cup singles match where she faced Israeli Shahar Pe'er, which she won in three sets. She also won her seventh and most recent ITF singles title that same month. Kvitová then made her Grand Slam tournament debut appearance at the French Open, and went to the last 16 where she lost to Kaia Kanepi in three sets, having defeated Akiko Morigami, Samantha Stosur and 12th seed Ágnes Szávay en route. Kvitová then made her Olympics debut at the Beijing Olympics, partnering Lucie Šafářová in doubles where the team lost to Australian pair of Stosur and Rennae Stubbs in the first round. In October, she reached the quarterfinals in Zurich as a qualifier where she lost to second seed Ana Ivanovic, but the result nevertheless placed her in the top 50 rankings for the first time ever. She finished 2008 ranked world No. 44.

Kvitová started 2009 impressively by reaching her first final, at the Hobart International, having defeated Sally Peers, Alona Bondarenko, Anastasia Pavlyuchenkova, Virginie Razzano en route. There, she defeated compatriot Iveta Benešová to lift her maiden career title. After suffering consecutive winless appearances at the Australian Open, the Open GdF Suez and the Dubai Championships, she reached the third round in Indian Wells, losing to eventual champion Vera Zvonareva. She was then forced to withdraw from the French Open due to an ankle injury, and withdrew in the first round of Wimbledon. At the US Open, she defeated then-world No. 1, Dinara Safina in the third round in three sets for her first win over a reigning world No. 1. Kvitová was ranked 71 places lower than Safina at the time. However, she came up short to eventual semifinalist Yanina Wickmayer in the round of 16, in three sets. At the Linz Open, Kvitová made her second final of the year, where she lost to Wickmayer once again. She concluded 2009 as world No. 62.

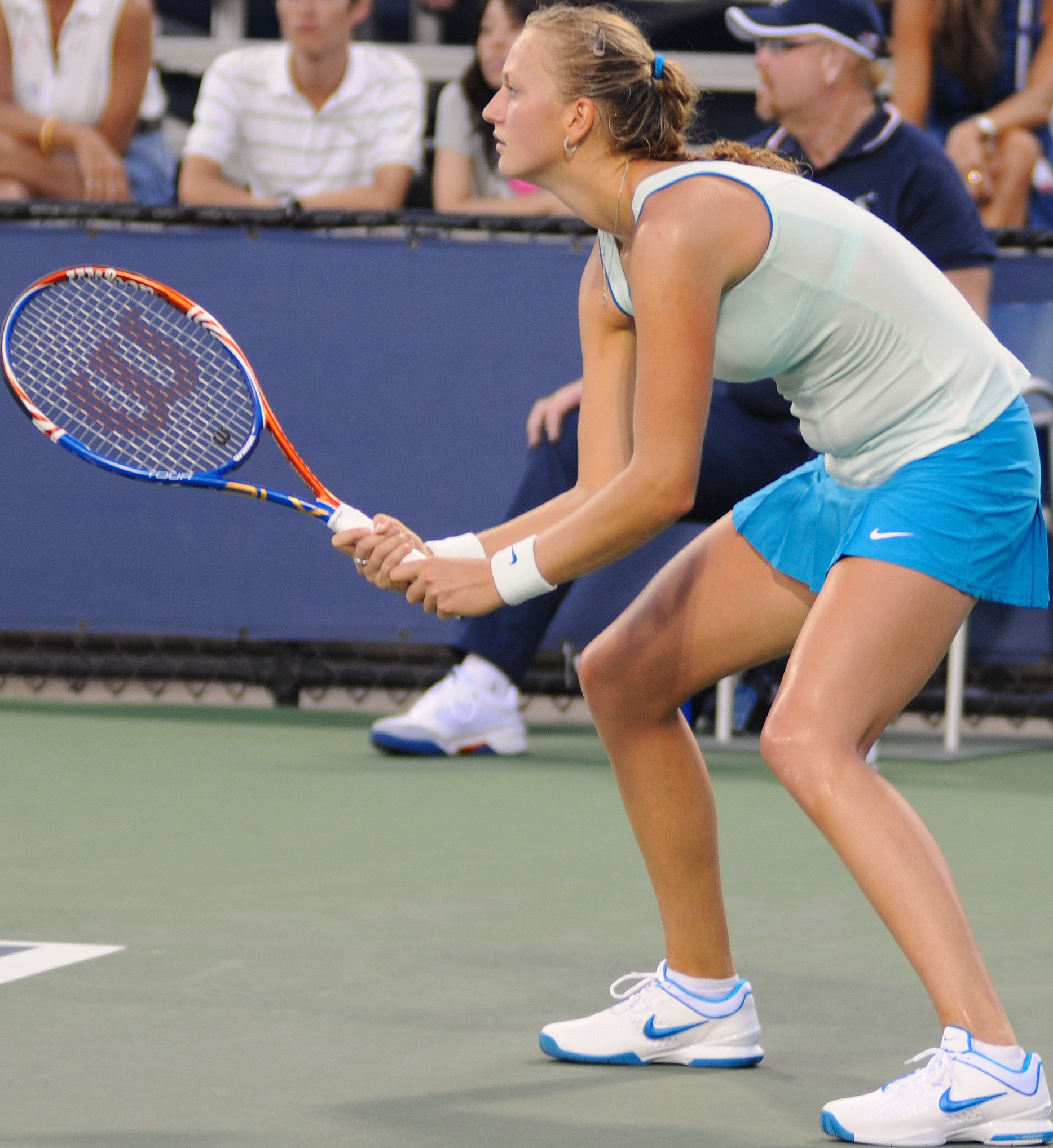
Kvitová at the 2010 US Open

In 2010, Kvitová reached the semifinals of the Memphis Open, losing to eventual champion Maria Sharapova. She then sailed to the semifinals of Wimbledon, defeating Sorana Cîrstea, Zheng Jie, Victoria Azarenka, Caroline Wozniacki, and Kaia Kanepi en route, before falling to defending and eventual champion Serena Williams in straight sets. Nevertheless, she was guaranteed to reach the top 30 rankings for the first time. However, after Wimbledon, she suffered five consecutive first round defeats before breaking the losing streak at the US Open. There, she defeated Lucie Hradecká and Elena Baltacha, before losing to defending and eventual champion Kim Clijsters in the third round, having led 3–0 in the first set before going on to lose the next 12 games in a row. Kvitová recorded her first top 40 finish in 2010, at world No. 34, and was also named WTA Newcomer of the Year.

=== 2011: First major and WTA Tour Championships titles ===
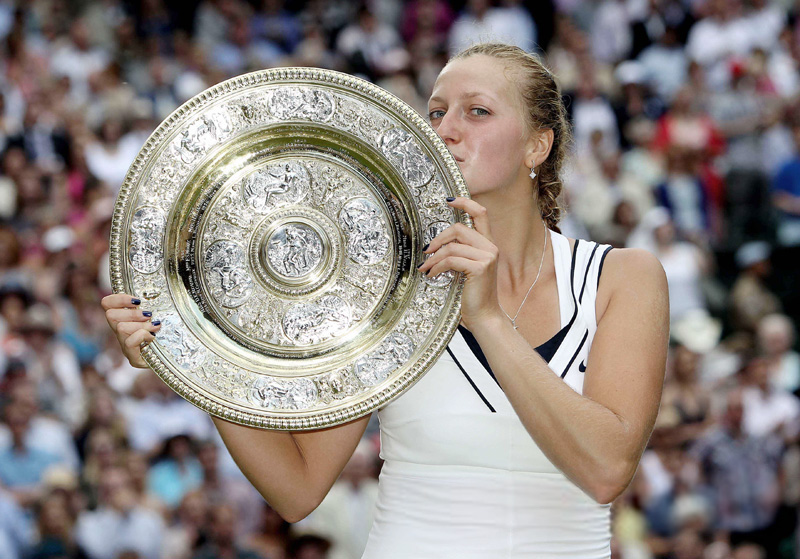
Kvitová holds the Venus Rosewater Dish, her first major crown, after winning the 2011 Wimbledon Championships.

Kvitová started 2011 by winning her second career title at the Brisbane International, defeating the likes of third seed Nadia Petrova and fifth seed Anastasia Pavlyuchenkova en route to the final, where she beat Andrea Petkovic for the title. With the win, she achieved the ranking of world No. 28. Kvitová was the 25th seed at the Australian Open, and made her first quarterfinal here, having defeated Sally Peers, Anna Chakvetadze, fifth seed Samantha Stosur and 22nd seed Flavia Pennetta en route, where she lost to second seed Vera Zvonareva in straight sets. Her strong run there ensured her a top 20 debut in the rankings, at world No. 18. Kvitová then beat Slovaks Dominika Cibulková and Daniela Hantuchová in the Fed Cup opening round to put the Czech team in the semifinals.

At the Open GdF Suez, Kvitová won her second title of the year by defeating newly crowned world No. 1 and newly crowned Australian Open champion, Kim Clijsters in the final, in straight sets. Once again, Kvitová's ranking rose to a new high of world No. 14. After that, she suffered an early loss to Ayumi Morita in Dubai. She then lost her next two opening matches to Barbora Záhlavová-Strýcová in Indian Wells, and to Kristina Barrois at an ITF tournament in Nassau. At the Miami Open, Kvitová defeated Varvara Lepchenko in the second round but then lost her next match to Pavlyuchenkova. In the Fed Cup semifinals against Belgium, she led the Czech team into the final, with wins over Yanina Wickmayer and Kirsten Flipkens.

Kvitová kicked off her clay-court season in Madrid, where she won her third title of the year and her first Premier Mandatory-level title. She beat Alexandra Dulgheru, Chanelle Scheepers and second seed Zvonareva to reach the last eight. She then overcame Cibulková and Li Na to reach the final where she defeated Victoria Azarenka to claim the title. She made her top 10 debut after the tournament at world No. 10. The following week, because Jelena Janković failed to defend her points in Rome, Kvitová moved one place up to No. 9. She played another ITF tournament at her home country in Prague that week, losing in the final to Magdaléna Rybáriková. Kvitová was the ninth seed at the French Open. She defeated Gréta Arn, Zheng Jie, and Vania King in straight sets, before losing to eventual champion Li Na in the fourth round, despite having led 3–0 in the deciding set.

Kvitová played a warm-up tournament for Wimbledon at Eastbourne and reached the final where she lost to Marion Bartoli in three sets. Kvitová then won her first Grand Slam title at the Wimbledon Championships. Seeded eighth, she defeated Alexa Glatch, Anne Keothavong, Roberta Vinci and Wickmayer en route to the quarterfinals. She then saw off Tsvetana Pironkova and fourth seed Azarenka to reach her first Grand Slam final, where she beat fifth seed Maria Sharapova in straight sets. Thus, she became the first left-handed female player to win the singles title since Martina Navratilova in 1990, the first player of either gender born in the 1990s to win a Grand Slam tournament title and the first Czech player to win a Grand Slam singles title since Jana Novotná won Wimbledon in 1998.

Following Wimbledon, she kicked off her US Open Series campaign at the Canadian Open, where she lost to Petkovic in the third round. The following week at the Cincinnati Open, she lost to Petkovic in the same round once more. She was then upset by Dulgheru in the opening round of the US Open, thus becoming the first Grand Slam champion to lose in the first round of the following Grand Slam tournament without winning a set.

Kvitová's form then improved in Tokyo, where she reached the semifinals, losing to Zvonareva. She cracked the top 5 rankings, at world No. 5, after Tokyo and also qualified for the Tour Championships for the first time in her career. However, the following week, she lost in the first round of the China Open to Sofia Arvidsson in three sets. Then, at the Linz Open, she defeated Rebecca Marino, Patricia Mayr-Achleitner, Hantuchová and Janković on the way to the final, where she beat Cibulková to collect her fifth title of the season.

At the Tour Championships in Istanbul, third-seeded Kvitová emerged champion, thus becoming the third player to win the title on debut. During the round-robin stage, she defeated Zvonareva, Wozniacki, and Agnieszka Radwańska in straight sets, putting her through to the semifinals. Her next opponent was Stosur, whom she beat to reach the final, a match against Azarenka for the world No. 2 ranking, which Kvitová won in three sets. She ended the year only 115 points second to Wozniacki for the No. 1 spot. She concluded 2011 by helping the Czech Republic win its maiden Fed Cup title as an independent nation, winning her singles rubbers against Maria Kirilenko and Svetlana Kuznetsova. In the end, the Czechs emerged victorious against Russia 3–2. She was also named WTA Player of the Year, WTA Most Improved Player of the Year and ITF World Champion in 2011. In addition, she also won the WTA Sportsmanship Award.

=== 2012: Continued success and Hopman Cup-/Fed Cup double ===
At the beginning of 2012, Kvitová was widely expected to reach the world No. 1 ranking. She stated that attaining the position "would be nice", but that her priority was to improve her game. Kvitová opted not to defend her title in Brisbane, choosing instead to participate in the Hopman Cup with Tomáš Berdych, where they won the title, defeating the French team in the final. She also won all of her singles matches at the event, defeating Tsvetana Pironkova, Bethanie Mattek-Sands, Caroline Wozniacki, and Marion Bartoli. At the Sydney International, Kvitová lost in the last four to Li Na. Had she won the tournament, she would have been the new world No. 1. Nevertheless, her run to the semifinals there saw her extend the longest winning streak of her career to date, 14 wins, that dates back to her title run in Linz last October. Then, at the Australian Open, where second-seeded Kvitová was the favourite for the title, she defeated Vera Dushevina, Carla Suárez Navarro, Maria Kirilenko and Ana Ivanovic to reach her second consecutive quarterfinal of the tournament. There, she saw off Sara Errani to advance to the semifinals, where she lost in three sets to Maria Sharapova, despite having been up a break in the third set.

On Fed Cup duty, Kvitová extended her long streak of wins in singles matches indoors, which started with her title run at the Open GdF Suez last year, to 25 matches, with her four victories against Germany and Italy, in the opening round and semifinal ties, respectively. She scored those wins over the likes of Germans Julia Görges and Sabine Lisicki, and Italians Francesca Schiavone and Errani.

In Indian Wells, Kvitová lost in the third round to Christina McHale in three sets. In Miami, she exited in the second round after falling to Venus Williams in three sets. The following month in Stuttgart, she defeated Schiavone and Angelique Kerber to reach the semifinals, where she lost to Sharapova in straight sets, thus snapping a long run of 27 consecutive wins indoors. At the Madrid Open, she was the defending champion, but lost in the second round to compatriot Lucie Hradecká. The following week in Rome, she beat Anastasia Pavlyuchenkova and Sorana Cîrstea to record her first quarterfinal appearance there, where she lost to Kerber. Kvitová was seeded fourth at the French Open. She advanced to the semifinals for the first time in her career, after defeating Ashleigh Barty, Urszula Radwańska, Nina Bratchikova, Varvara Lepchenko, and Yaroslava Shvedova. There, for the third time this year, she lost to Sharapova, this time allowing the Russian to reclaim the No. 1 ranking.

Kvitová started her grass-court season in Eastbourne, where she fell to Ekaterina Makarova in the second round. As the fourth seed at Wimbledon, Kvitová defeated Akgul Amanmuradova, Elena Baltacha and Lepchenko to reach the fourth round. She then beat Schiavone to reach the quarterfinals but the first-time defending champion's journey came to an end, after she was overwhelmed in straight sets by four-time and eventual champion, Serena Williams. After Wimbledon, Kvitová dropped out of the top 5 rankings. Kvitová then competed at the Summer Olympics, making her maiden appearance in the singles discipline. As the sixth seed, she defeated Kateryna Bondarenko and Peng Shuai in the first two rounds, both in straight sets. She then overcame Flavia Pennetta to reach the quarterfinals. There, she was upset by Kirilenko in straight sets.

Kvitová kickstarted her US Open Series campaign by winning the Canadian Open, the eighth title of her career. She defeated Ksenia Pervak in her opener and then moved past Bartoli to reach the quarterfinals, where she beat Tamira Paszek. She then beat Wozniacki in three sets to reach the final, where she overcame Li in three sets to win the title, thus ending a 10-month title drought. At the Cincinnati Open, she reached the semifinals, falling to Kerber once again. She then won her second title of the year and the ninth of her career in New Haven, defeating Nicole Gibbs, Lucie Šafářová, Errani and Kirilenko along the way. She also secured the US Open Series crown after her win over Šafářová in New Haven. At the US Open, she reached the fourth round for the first time since 2009. Along the way, she defeated Polona Hercog, Alizé Cornet, and Pauline Parmentier. She then lost to Bartoli in three sets.

During the Asian swing, Kvitová did not enjoy much success as she suffered early losses in Tokyo and Beijing. Kvitová was named the sixth qualifier for the Tour Championships following the China Open. As the defending champion, she dropped her first round-robin match to Agnieszka Radwańska in straight sets and was then forced to withdraw with a virus. Kvitová ended 2012 as world No. 8. She then helped the Czech team to defend its Fed Cup title, going 1–1 in singles matches against Serbia in the final before the Czech Republic won 3–1 in the tie through Šafářová.

=== 2013: Mixed results and late-season revival ===
Kvitová began 2013 at the Brisbane International. Seeded sixth, she bowed out in the second round to eventual runner-up Anastasia Pavlyuchenkova. She then dropped her opening match in Sydney to Dominika Cibulková. Kvitová was the eighth seed at the Australian Open. She moved past Francesca Schiavone in the first round in three sets. In the second round, however, she struggled against Laura Robson and eventually succumbed to the Brit in three sets. Kvitová was then awarded a wildcard into the Open GdF Suez. She defeated Stefanie Vögele to reach the quarterfinals, where she was upset by Kristina Mladenovic in straight sets. In the opening round of Fed Cup, where the Czech team faced Australia, Kvitová started with a win in singles over Jarmila Gajdošová and followed it up with a three-set victory over Samantha Stosur, saving a match point in the process. The Czechs then advanced to the semifinals with a 4–0 scoreline.

Kvitová then sailed to her first title of the year, and a milestone 10th of her career, in Dubai, despite having never won a match at the tournament before. She defeated the likes of Daniela Hantuchová, Ana Ivanovic, Agnieszka Radwańska, Caroline Wozniacki and Sara Errani en route to the title. This was followed by a quarterfinal appearance at the Qatar Open, where she lost to Serena Williams in three sets, thus allowing Williams to regain the world No. 1 ranking. She then reached her first ever quarterfinal at the Indian Wells Open. As the fifth seed, she defeated Olga Govortsova, Lesia Tsurenko and Klara Zakopalová before coming up short to Maria Kirilenko in three sets. This was followed by a loss to Kirsten Flipkens in the third round of Miami.

Kvitová started her clay-court season by reaching the final in Katowice, where she was upset by Roberta Vinci in straight sets. During the Fed Cup semifinal tie against Italy, Kvitová lost to Vinci once again in her first match before managing to overcome Errani in three sets. However, in a repeat of their 2010 semifinal tie result, the Czechs, who were the two-time defending champions, fell to the Italian team once more. In Stuttgart, Kvitová beat Germans Annika Beck and Julia Görges to reach the quarterfinals, where she lost to Li Na. She then suffered an early exit in Madrid to Hantuchová. In Rome, she struggled past Sabine Lisicki in her opener but then lost to Stosur. At the French Open, Kvitová beat Aravane Rezaï and Peng Shuai before losing in the third round to Jamie Hampton in straight sets, in a match where she struggled.

Kvitová kicked off the grass-court season in Eastbourne, losing to Yanina Wickmayer in the second round. Seeded eighth, Kvitová reached the quarterfinals of Wimbledon. She overcame CoCo Vandeweghe in the first round in three sets before receiving a walkover from Yaroslava Shvedova. She reached the last eight after defeating Ekaterina Makarova and Carla Suárez Navarro but there, she succumbed to Flipkens in three sets.

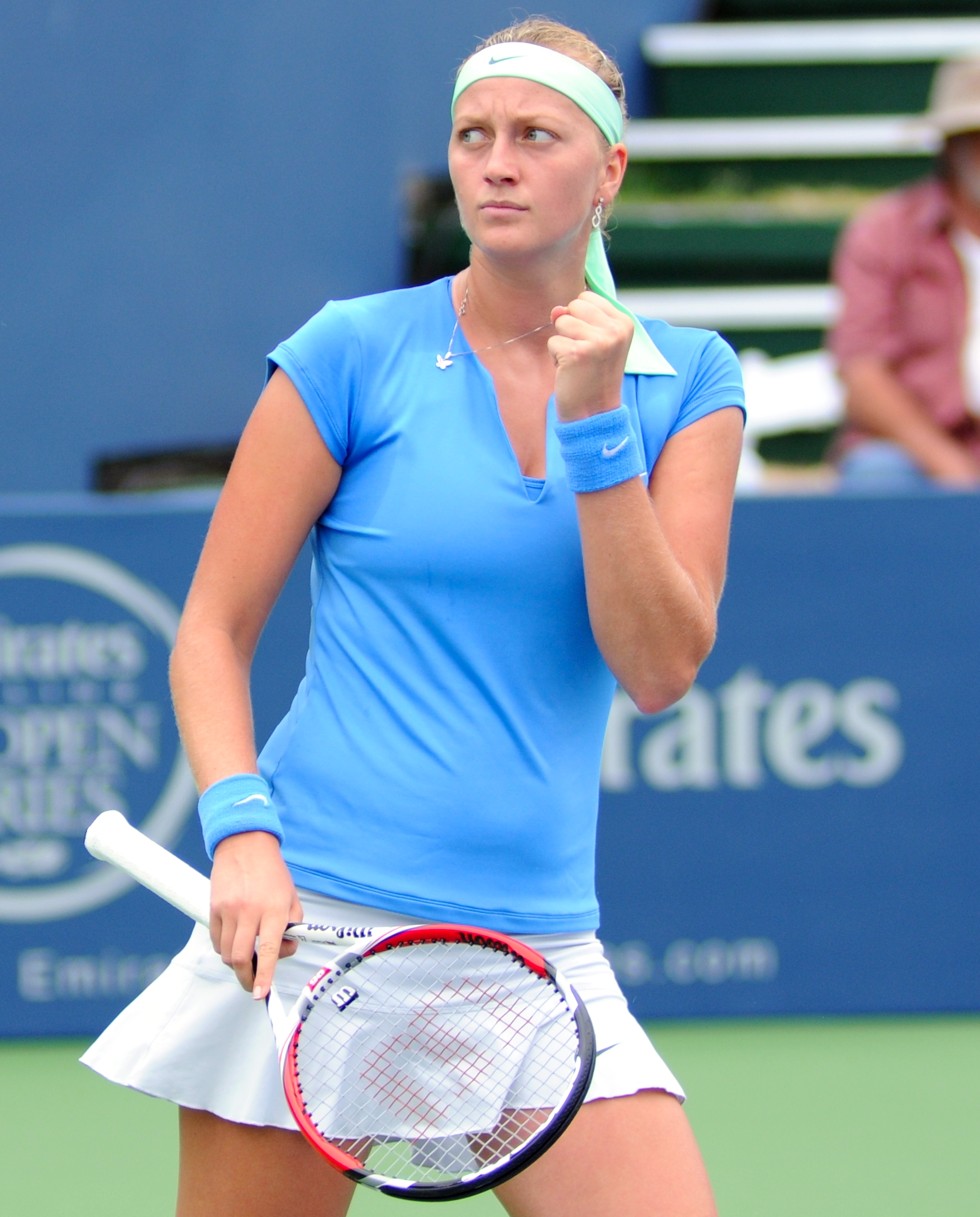
Kvitová at the 2013 Southern California Open

During the US Open Series, Kvitová reached the last eight of the Southern California Open, where she was upset by Virginie Razzano despite having two match points. She was the defending champion at the Canadian Open and defeated Eugenie Bouchard and Stosur to reach the quarterfinals but failed to defend her title when she lost to eventual finalist Sorana Cîrstea in three sets. At the Cincinnati Open, she lost to Wozniacki in the third round. Kvitová was the defending champion in New Haven and made the final once more but was defeated by the rising Simona Halep. At the US Open, she fell to Alison Riske in the third round, causing her to drop out of the top 10 for the first time since May 2011.

At the Pan Pacific Open, seventh-seeded Kvitová reached the quarterfinals after defeating a pair of youngsters, Belinda Bencic and Madison Keys, both in straight sets. Then, she overcame Svetlana Kuznetsova and Venus Williams to reach the final, where she defeated Angelique Kerber for her second title of 2013, her 11th career title overall. She moved back into the top 10 by virtue of that result. She then reached the semifinals of the China Open, where she lost to Jelena Janković. As a result of her strong results in Asia, she qualified for the Tour Championships on 7 October. As the fifth seed, she qualified for the semifinals after recording victories over Radwańska and Kerber in the round-robin stage but there, she lost to Li in straight sets. She ended the year as world No. 6. Furthermore, Kvitová was awarded the Karen Krantzcke Sportsmanship Award for the second time.

=== 2014: Second Wimbledon title and Fed Cup triplet ===
Kvitová started 2014 by playing the Hopman Cup with Radek Štěpánek. She won all of her singles matches but they did not advance to the final, finishing second in their group behind eventual champions France. Kvitová then competed in Sydney, where she advanced to the last four after defeating Christina McHale and compatriot Lucie Šafářová. There, she was stunned by qualifier Tsvetana Pironkova in straight sets. At the Australian Open, she succumbed to Luksika Kumkhum in the first round in three sets. It was the first time Kvitová exited a Grand Slam tournament in the opening round since the 2011 US Open.

Kvitová was scheduled to play the Open GdF Suez, but withdrew prior to her opening match because of a respiratory illness. Because of this illness, she was unable to compete in the Fed Cup opening round tie against Spain. At the Qatar Open, third-seeded Kvitová cruised into the quarterfinals with two tough three-set victories over Venus Williams and Šafářová before falling to Jelena Janković in straight sets. At the Dubai Championships, she failed to defend her title when she lost her opening match to Carla Suárez Navarro. Next, Kvitová competed in Indian Wells, where she was the eighth seed. She beat Coco Vandeweghe and 27th seed Svetlana Kuznetsova before losing to 12th seed Dominika Cibulková in the round of 16. In Miami, she was seeded eighth again and defeated Paula Ormaechea, Donna Vekić and 12th seed Ana Ivanovic to reach her first quarterfinal of the tournament. There, she fell to fourth seed Maria Sharapova in straight sets.

At the Fed Cup semifinal tie against Italy, Kvitová dispatched both Camila Giorgi and Roberta Vinci in straight sets, thus sending the Czech team into their third final in the last four years. Kvitová began her clay court campaign in Stuttgart, losing to Alisa Kleybanova in her opening match. At the Madrid Open, she defeated Sorana Cîrstea, Varvara Lepchenko and Šafářová to reach the quarterfinals, where she received a walkover from top seed Serena Williams. She lost to Simona Halep in the last four. Kvitová then lost her opening match in Rome to Zhang Shuai, before bowing out in the third round of the French Open for the second year in a row, this time to former champion Kuznetsova in a marathon three-setter.

During the grass-court swing, Kvitová competed in Eastbourne, where she advanced to the quarterfinals but was then forced to withdraw due to a hamstring injury. Kvitová was seeded sixth at Wimbledon. She won her first two matches easily against compatriot Andrea Hlaváčková and German Mona Barthel. She faced former champion and 30th seed Venus Williams in the third round and was two points away from losing the match but went on to win in three sets. After dismissing Peng Shuai in the fourth round, she beat two more Czechs in the form of Barbora Záhlavová-Strýcová and Šafářová to reach the final. There, she defeated Eugenie Bouchard in straight sets to win her second Grand Slam title. She rose to world No. 4 as a result, thus returning to the top 5 rankings for the first time since 2012.

Kvitová kicked off the US Open Series at the Canadian Open where she was the second seed. She received a first round bye and faced Aussie Casey Dellacqua in her opening match, which she won in straight sets. In the third round, she lost to Ekaterina Makarova in three sets. In Cincinnati, third-seeded Kvitová received a first round bye and faced Elina Svitolina in her opener but was upset by the Ukrainian in straight sets. At the Connecticut Open where she was seeded second, she received a bye into second round where she faced Makarova again, whom which she defeated easily in straight sets this time to reach the last eight. She was the only seed to reach the quarterfinals. There, she beat Záhlavová-Strýcová in straight sets. She then went on to defeat Samantha Stosur to reach her third consecutive final in New Haven. She won the title by defeating Magdaléna Rybáriková in the final, her 13th career title. At the US Open, Kvitová was upset by qualifier Aleksandra Krunić in the third round.

The following month at the inaugural Wuhan Open, third-seeded Kvitová cruised into the third round on an upset-filled day by defeating Karin Knapp in her opening match in straight sets. She then overcame fellow Czech Karolína Plíšková for a place in the last eight where she moved past Caroline Garcia. In the semifinals, Kvitová avenged her loss to Svitolina by defeating the Ukrainian in straight sets to reach the final. There, she beat Bouchard in straight sets to claim her 14th career title. With this victory, Kvitová became the fourth player to qualify for the WTA Finals in Singapore. It was also the first time since 2011 where she had won more than two titles in a season. Then, the following week at the China Open, Kvitová carried on her good form by reaching her fourth final of the year but lost to Sharapova in three sets.

At the WTA Finals, Kvitová was upset by Agnieszka Radwańska in her opening match in straight sets. She then recorded a straight-set victory over Sharapova, ending a five-match losing streak against her, but then lost her bid to qualify for the semifinals when she succumbed to Caroline Wozniacki in her last round-robin match. Nevertheless, Kvitová ended the year as world No. 4. At the Fed Cup where Czech Republic faced Germany for the title, she saw off over Andrea Petkovic in straight sets, and Angelique Kerber in a thrilling three-setter, enabling the Czech team to clinch its third Fed Cup title in four years with the final score of the tie at 3–1. Kvitová received two awards in 2014, the Karen Krantzcke Sportsmanship Award and the Diamond Aces Award.

=== 2015: Steady ranking and coping with mononucleosis ===
Kvitová kicked off 2015 in Shenzhen as the second seed, where she lost to eighth seed Timea Bacsinszky in the semifinals. Kvitová was the second seed in Sydney and received a first round bye. She defeated Peng Shuai in the second round and then beat Jarmila Gajdošová in the last eight. In a rematch of their semifinal here a year ago, Kvitová avenged her earlier loss to Tsvetana Pironkova, and then went on to defeat fellow Czech Karolína Plíšková in the final for her first title of the year, the 15th of her career. At the Australian Open, fourth-seeded Kvitová was upset by Madison Keys in the third round in straight sets. Kvitová then lost in Dubai and Doha, in the third round and quarterfinals, respectively, both at the hands of Carla Suárez Navarro. She subsequently withdrew from Indian Wells and Miami due to exhaustion. She launched her comeback after a six-week break at the Fed Cup semifinals, where the Czechs faced France. Kvitová won both her rubbers in straight sets, defeating Kristina Mladenovic and Caroline Garcia. The Czech team subsequently advanced to the final for the fourth time in five years.

After dropping her opening match in Stuttgart to Madison Brengle, Kvitová sailed into the quarterfinals in Madrid with wins over Olga Govortsova, Coco Vandeweghe and Anastasia Pavlyuchenkova. She then advanced to the semifinals after dispatching Irina-Camelia Begu in straight sets, setting up a clash with world No. 1, Serena Williams. She had not beaten Williams in five previous attempts but upset the American in straight sets to advance to her second Madrid final. The win also ended Williams' 27-match winning streak dating back to the WTA Finals the previous year. In the final, she defeated Svetlana Kuznetsova in a dominating performance to claim her 16th career title. The following week in Rome, Kvitová cruised into her second quarterfinal here but lost to Suárez Navarro for the third time this year. Seeded fourth at the French Open, she defeated Marina Erakovic, Sílvia Soler Espinosa and 30th seed Begu to reach the fourth round of a Grand Slam tournament outside of Wimbledon for the first time since the 2012 US Open. There, she was upset by 24th seed Bacsinszky in three sets. Nevertheless, following the tournament's conclusion, Kvitová returned to the world No. 2 ranking for the first time since February 2012.

Kvitová began her grass-court season at Wimbledon, after withdrawing from Eastbourne the week before with an illness. As the defending champion and the second seed, she handily defeated Kiki Bertens in the first round in 35 minutes, losing just one point on serve via a double fault. She then defeated Kurumi Nara in the second round in straight sets to advance to the third round where she faced 28th seed Jelena Janković. There, Kvitová led by a set and a break, but was upset by the former world No. 1 in the end in a tight three-setter, thus ending her journey as the defending champion.

In August, it was revealed that Kvitová was diagnosed with mononucleosis (also known as glandular fever) and that she contracted the virus during spring earlier in the year but nevertheless, was cleared to compete. During the US Open Series, Kvitová lost her openers in Toronto and Cincinnati. As the defending champion at the Connecticut Open, second-seeded Kvitová received a bye in the opening round and safely advanced to the semifinals after defeating Keys and Agnieszka Radwańska. She then rolled past Caroline Wozniacki in straight sets for a place in her fourth straight final at the tournament, where she beat compatriot Lucie Šafářová in three sets for her 17th career title. With this win, she also successfully defended a title for the first time in her career. At the US Open, Kvitová was the fifth seed and reached the fourth round after defeating Laura Siegemund, wildcard Nicole Gibbs and 32nd seed Anna Karolína Schmiedlová, all in straight sets. She then advanced to her maiden quarterfinal at the tournament after seeing off qualifier Johanna Konta, thus completing the feat of reaching at least the quarterfinals of all four Grand Slam tournaments in her career. There, she fell short to 26th seed and eventual champion Flavia Pennetta in three sets.

The Asian swing was not a successful one for Kvitová as she lost early in Wuhan and Beijing. Nevertheless, she qualified for the WTA Finals on 14 October. Seeded fourth, she lost her round-robin matches to Angelique Kerber and Garbiñe Muguruza but scored a win over Šafářová. However, she managed to secure a spot in the semifinals where she defeated Maria Sharapova in straight sets to advance to her second final at the tournament. This was also the first ever final of the tournament since the inception of the round-robin format between two players with a losing record in the group stage. There, she lost to Radwańska in three sets. Kvitová finished the year as world No. 6. She participated in the Fed Cup final, going 1–1 in her singles matches, with the Czechs defending their title in the end by winning the decisive doubles rubber. That year, Kvitová also won the Karen Krantzcke Sportsmanship Award for the third year running.

=== 2016: Olympic bronze and Fed Cup quintet ===
Kvitová had a slow start in 2016 due to gastrointestinal illness, going 2–4 in main draw matches for the first two months, with the wins coming over Luksika Kumkhum at the Australian Open and Barbora Strýcová in Doha. A week after the conclusion of the Australian Open, Kvitová and long-time coach David Kotyza split. In the Fed Cup opening round tie against Romania, she lost both of her singles matches. However, the Czech team ultimately cruised into the semifinals with the score 3–2. At the Indian Wells Open where she was seeded eighth, Kvitová won consecutive matches for the first time in almost six months, reaching her first quarterfinal of the year in the process. There, she lost to Agnieszka Radwańska in straight sets. However, this was followed by an early loss in Miami in the hands of 30th seed Ekaterina Makarova.

Entering the clay court swing, Kvitová announced Czech doubles specialist František Čermák as her new coach. Seeded fifth in Stuttgart, she made her first semifinal at the tournament since 2012 but there, she lost to eventual champion Angelique Kerber. She then lost early in Madrid and Rome, the former in which she was the defending champion. As a result, she dropped out of the top 10 for the first time since September 2013, at world No. 12, also her lowest ranking since May 2011. At the French Open, Kvitová was upset by eventual surprise quarterfinalist Shelby Rogers in the third round in three sets, receiving bagels in both sets lost.

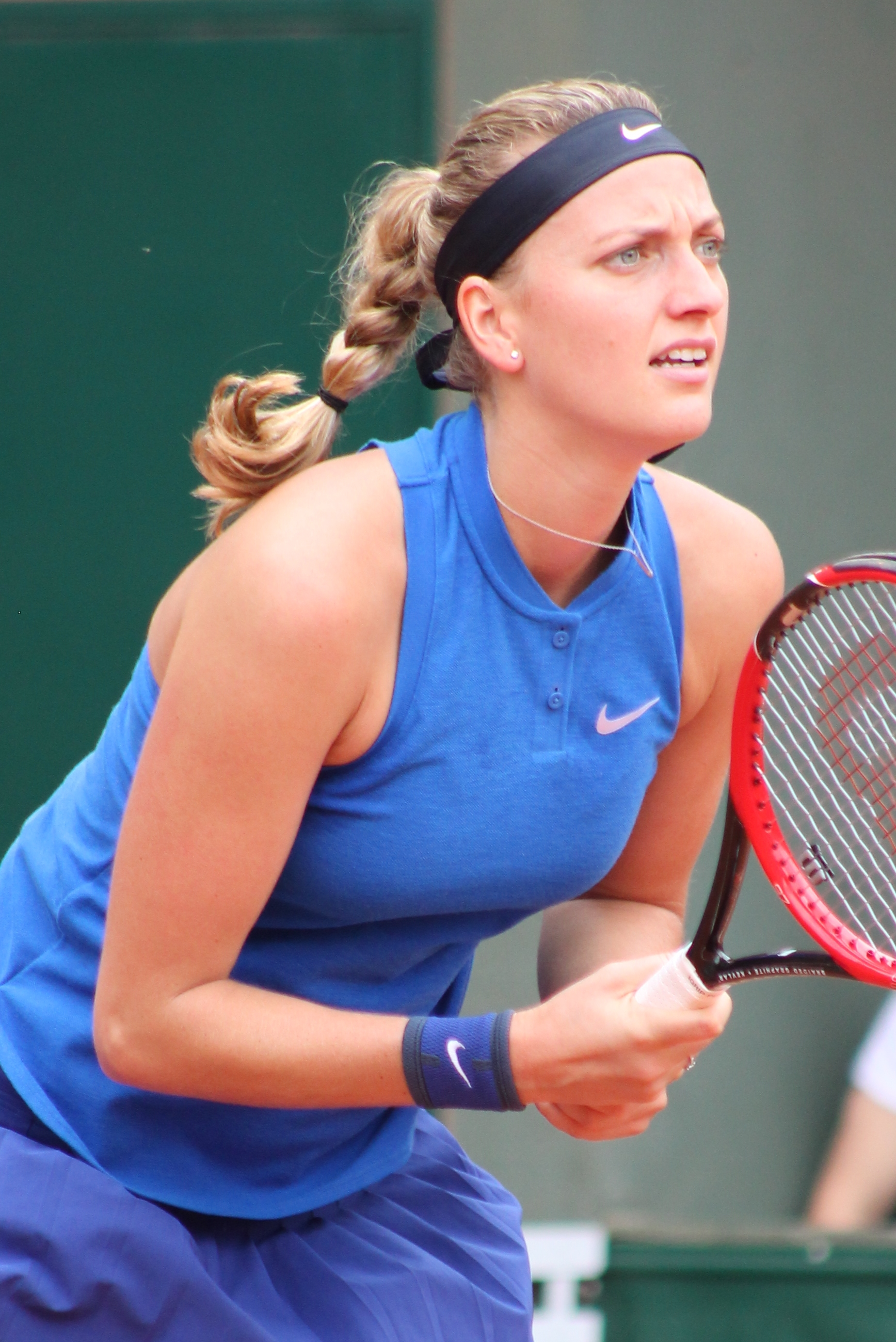
Kvitová at the 2016 French Open

Kvitová suffered a dire grass-court season as she failed to produce a winning record on the surface, falling early to Jeļena Ostapenko and Johanna Konta in Birmingham and Eastbourne respectively. Seeded 10th at Wimbledon, she easily defeated Sorana Cîrstea in the first round. In a rain-interrupted second round encounter against Makarova, however, she succumbed to the Russian in a tight straight-set loss. After Wimbledon, Kvitová exited the top 10 once again, having spent a short stint there throughout the tournament's two-week duration.

Kicking off the US Open Series in Montreal, Kvitová made the round of 16 where she lost to Svetlana Kuznetsova in straight sets. At the Summer Olympics, 11th-seeded Kvitová defeated the likes of Tímea Babos and Caroline Wozniacki, and then avenged her earlier two losses to Makarova to sail into her second consecutive Olympic quarterfinal, where she beat Elina Svitolina in straight sets. She came up short to eventual gold medallist Monica Puig in the semifinals, but then defeated Madison Keys in the bronze medal match to win her first ever Olympic medal. Thus, she became the first Czech player of either gender to win an Olympic medal in the singles discipline since Jana Novotná in 1996. Kvitová was the two-time defending champion in New Haven but saw her title defence come to an end in the semifinals in the hands of Radwańska. As the 14th seed at the US Open, where for the first time since the 2011 Australian Open, Kvitová was not a top 10 seed at a Grand Slam tournament, she reached the fourth round but lost to eventual champion Kerber in straight sets. The loss meant Kvitová has failed to make a single Grand Slam quarterfinal in a season for the first time since 2009. After the US Open, Kvitová announced that she and coach Čermák have gone separate ways.

Kvitová began the Asian swing with a loss to Puig in the second round of Tokyo. At the Wuhan Open, she sailed past Ostapenko and Svitolina in straight sets for a place in the third round. There, she scored her fourth win over a reigning world No. 1 when she defeated Kerber in three sets, in a match that lasted nearly three-and-a-half hours. In the quarterfinals, she beat Konta and then in the last four, she went on to score her first win over Simona Halep to reach her first final of the year. There, she dominated Dominika Cibulková in straight sets for her 18th career title, thus putting an end to a 13-month title drought. She then reached the quarterfinals of the China Open where she lost to Keys. The loss ended Kvitová's hopes of qualifying for the WTA Finals, having recorded five straight appearances at the event dating back to 2011. At the Luxembourg Open, top-seeded Kvitová reached the final but lost to Monica Niculescu in straight sets.

Despite not making the cut for the WTA Finals, Kvitová qualified for the WTA Elite Trophy. As the third seed, she was drawn into the same group as Roberta Vinci and Strýcová, defeating both players in straight sets to advance to the semifinals where she sailed past wildcard Zhang Shuai. In the final, she beat Svitolina in straight sets to win the tournament on debut, thus lifting her 19th career title and her first title indoors since winning the WTA Finals in 2011. Kvitová ended the season as world No. 11. She then represented her nation in the Fed Cup final where they took on France. Despite losing her only singles rubber against Caroline Garcia, the Czechs went on to successfully defend their title by winning the tie 3–2 to lift their third successive trophy, their fifth in the last six years. With that achievement, Kvitová claimed the record of most Fed Cup titles won by a Czech player, having been part of all of the teams that took home those five crowns. Moreover, she was awarded the WTA Sportsmanship Award for the fourth year in a row, her fifth overall.

=== 2017: Comeback from knife attack and out of top 20 ===
During the off-season in 2016, going into 2017, Kvitová announced Jiří Vaněk as her new coach. However, her plans were jeopardized when she was attacked during a break-in at her home in the Czech Republic by a knife-wielding robber shortly before Christmas. During the break-in she suffered cuts to her dominant left hand, resulting in injuries to the tendons and nerves. She was initially expected to be sidelined for six months. In late May, Kvitová announced she would return to competition at the French Open, a month ahead of schedule. She kicked off her Paris comeback with a win against American Julia Boserup in the first round. However, she lost to Bethanie Mattek-Sands in the following round in straight sets.

Kvitová began the grass-court swing at the Birmingham Classic, where she defeated both Tereza Smitková and Naomi Broady in straight sets to reach her first quarterfinal of 2017, also her first on grass since the 2014 Wimbledon Championships. There, she took down fifth seed Kristina Mladenovic to reach the last four, where she moved past Lucie Šafářová. In the final, she beat Ashleigh Barty in three sets for her milestone 20th career title. However, she then suffered a second consecutive loss in the second round of Wimbledon, this time to Madison Brengle in three sets.

During the US Open Series, Kvitová posted a quarterfinal appearance in Stanford, but then lost early in Toronto and Cincinnati, both at the hands of the resurgent Sloane Stephens, before bowing out in the opening round of New Haven to Zhang Shuai. However, she bounced back at the US Open by beating Jelena Janković, Alizé Cornet and 18th seed Caroline Garcia to reach the fourth round. There, she saw off third seed Garbiñe Muguruza to sail into her tenth Grand Slam tournament quarterfinal where she was stopped by ninth seed Venus Williams in three sets.

Kvitová kicked off the Asian Swing in Wuhan where she was the defending champion and faced local player Peng Shuai at the first hurdle, but came up short in an epic three-set match that lasted three hours and 34 minutes. At the China Open, she moved past fellow Czech Kristýna Plíšková and American Varvara Lepchenko to reach the third round where saw off fifth seed Caroline Wozniacki, in straight sets. She then beat Barbora Strýcová to reach the semifinals but there, she was defeated by eventual champion Garcia in straight sets. The loss meant that for the first time since 2010, Kvitová did not win a Premier Mandatory or Premier 5 title during a season. She then lost in the first round of Tianjin to Zhu Lin, in three sets. As a result of not qualifying for the WTA Elite Trophy where she was the defending champion, Kvitová fell out of the top 20 rankings for the first time since January 2011. She subsequently concluded the year as world No. 29. Nevertheless, Kvitová was awarded the Karen Krantzcke Sportsmanship Award once again, her fifth in succession and sixth in the last seven seasons.

=== 2018: Five WTA Tour titles and re-entry into top 5 ===
Kvitová started 2018 in Sydney, unseeded at a Premier event for the first time since the 2010 Kremlin Cup, having been forced to withdraw from Brisbane the week before due to a viral illness. She lost to Camila Giorgi in the second round. She then fell in the opening round of the Australian Open, succumbing to Andrea Petkovic in three sets despite having served for the match twice. However, she bounced back by winning the St. Petersburg Ladies' Trophy. En route to the final, she saw past the likes of Elena Vesnina, Irina-Camelia Begu, Jeļena Ostapenko and Julia Görges. She then beat Kristina Mladenovic in the final in a dominating performance to win her 21st career title, thus becoming the first left-handed player to win a singles title in Russia. Kvitová then won her singles matches against Viktorija Golubic and Belinda Bencic in the opening round of the Fed Cup where the Czech Republic took on Switzerland, with the Czechs eventually cruising into the last four with the score 3–1, also their tenth consecutive Fed Cup semifinal appearance. The tie also marked the first time since the 2015 final against Russia where Kvitová won a Fed Cup match.

Kvitová carried her good form into the Qatar Ladies Open, defeating Çağla Büyükakçay, Agnieszka Radwańska and Elina Svitolina to reach the quarterfinals. There, she moved past Görges via a retirement and then overcame world No. 1, Caroline Wozniacki, in three sets to move into the final, where she outlasted fourth seed Garbiñe Muguruza in three sets to capture her 22nd career title, thus guaranteeing her return to the top 10 for the first time since June 2016. In Indian Wells, ninth-seeded Kvitová scrapped past Kazakh Yulia Putintseva in the opener in three sets to record the equal-longest winning streak of her career, 14 wins, dating back to her title run in St. Petersburg a month before. However, she saw that streak expire when she lost to young American wildcard Amanda Anisimova in the following round in straight sets. She then beat Aryna Sabalenka and Sofia Kenin to reach the fourth round in Miami where she was beaten by Ostapenko.

Kvitová started off her clay-court season with her maiden appearance in Charleston but lost her opener to fellow Czech Kristýna Plíšková, marking her first loss to a Czech player since May 2012, having amassed a run of 24 consecutive wins against her compatriots during that period. Then, facing Germany in the Fed Cup semifinals, she notched wins over Görges and Angelique Kerber, thus sending the Czech team into its sixth final in the last eight years. This was followed by a loss to Kerber in the first round of Stuttgart. Kvitová then enacted a 13-match winning streak the remainder of the clay court swing, first, by claiming the title in Prague, her maiden title on home soil, dispatching Tereza Smitková, Natalia Vikhlyantseva, Kateřina Siniaková and Zhang Shuai to reach the final, all without the loss of a set. There, she came back from a set down to beat Mihaela Buzărnescu for her 23rd career title, her first at an International-level tournament since Linz in 2011. She then breezed through to her second crown in two weeks by winning her third title in Madrid, becoming the first woman to do so, by seeing off Lesia Tsurenko, Monica Puig, Anett Kontaveit, Daria Kasatkina and Karolína Plíšková to make the final, where she fought through a tough three-setter to see off Kiki Bertens for her 24th career title. The winning streak ended at the French Open, when she crashed out in the third round to 25th seed Kontaveit in straight sets.

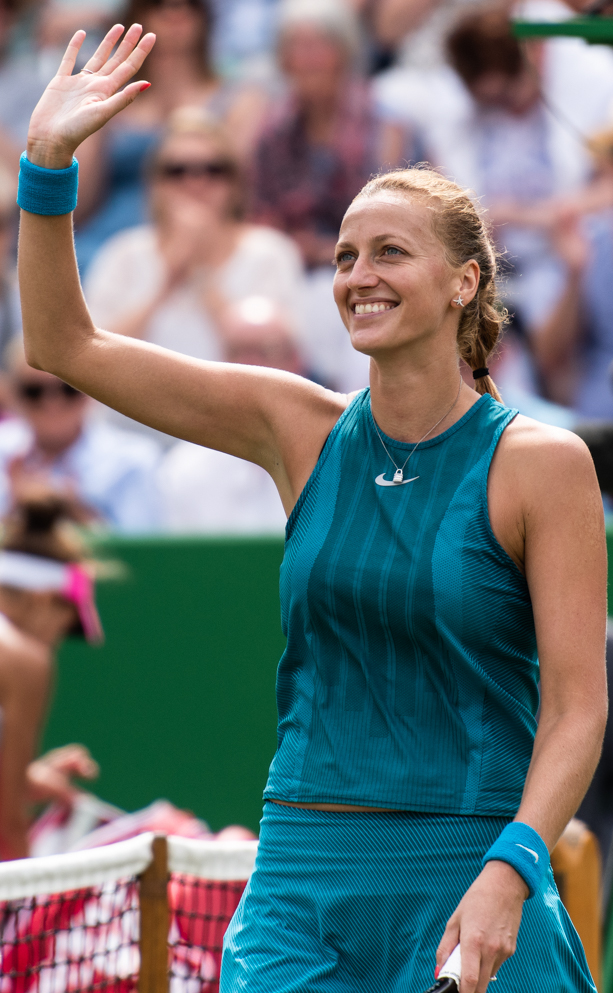
Kvitová at the 2018 Birmingham Classic

Starting the grass-court season in Birmingham where she was the defending champion, Kvitová saw off the likes of Johanna Konta and Daria Gavrilova to record her fifth quarterfinal appearance of 2018. There, she beat Görges in straight sets for her 50th main draw win on grass. She then moved past Buzarnescu to reach the final where she defeated Magdaléna Rybáriková in three sets for her 25th career title, also the second successful title defence of her career after the 2015 Connecticut Open. She then beat Kateryna Bondarenko in her opener in Eastbourne before withdrawing due to a hamstring injury. At Wimbledon, Kvitová bowed out in the first round on a day filled with upsets, succumbing to Aliaksandra Sasnovich in three sets. It was her first defeat in the opening round of the tournament since 2009, and 2018 also marks the first season since 2009 where she suffered multiple opening-round exits at the Grand Slam tournaments.

Kvitová began the month of August at the Canadian Open where she was dispatched by Bertens in the third round in straight sets. The following week in Cincinnati, her form improved, beating Serena Williams, Mladenovic and 15th seed Elise Mertens to sail into her first semifinal of the tournament since 2012, where she was stopped by Bertens once more, this time in three sets. Nevertheless, Kvitová returned to the top 5 rankings for the first time in almost three years by virtue of that result. She then made the quarterfinals of the Connecticut Open where she retired to Carla Suárez Navarro after dropping the first set due to a shoulder injury. This was followed by a defeat in the hands of 26th seed Sabalenka in the third round of the US Open. The loss meant that for the first time in her career, Kvitová has failed to record an appearance in the second week at the Grand Slams in a season.

Kvitová then suffered a dismal Asian Swing with early exits in Wuhan and Beijing. On 4 October, she became the fourth player to qualify for the WTA Finals. Seeded fourth in her first appearance at the tournament since 2015, she bowed out in the round-robin stage, failing to score a win with losses to Svitolina, Wozniacki and Plíšková, thus making it her worst result of the tournament to date. She ended the year ranked world No. 7, her first top 10 finish since 2015. In the Fed Cup final, where Czech Republic took on the United States, Kvitová was nominated as part of the Czech team but illness forced her out of play. Nevertheless, the Czechs won the tie with the score 3–0, making it their sixth Fed Cup title in the last eight seasons. Furthermore, Kvitová was awarded the WTA Sportsmanship for the seventh time overall.

=== 2019: Australian Open final and injury struggles ===
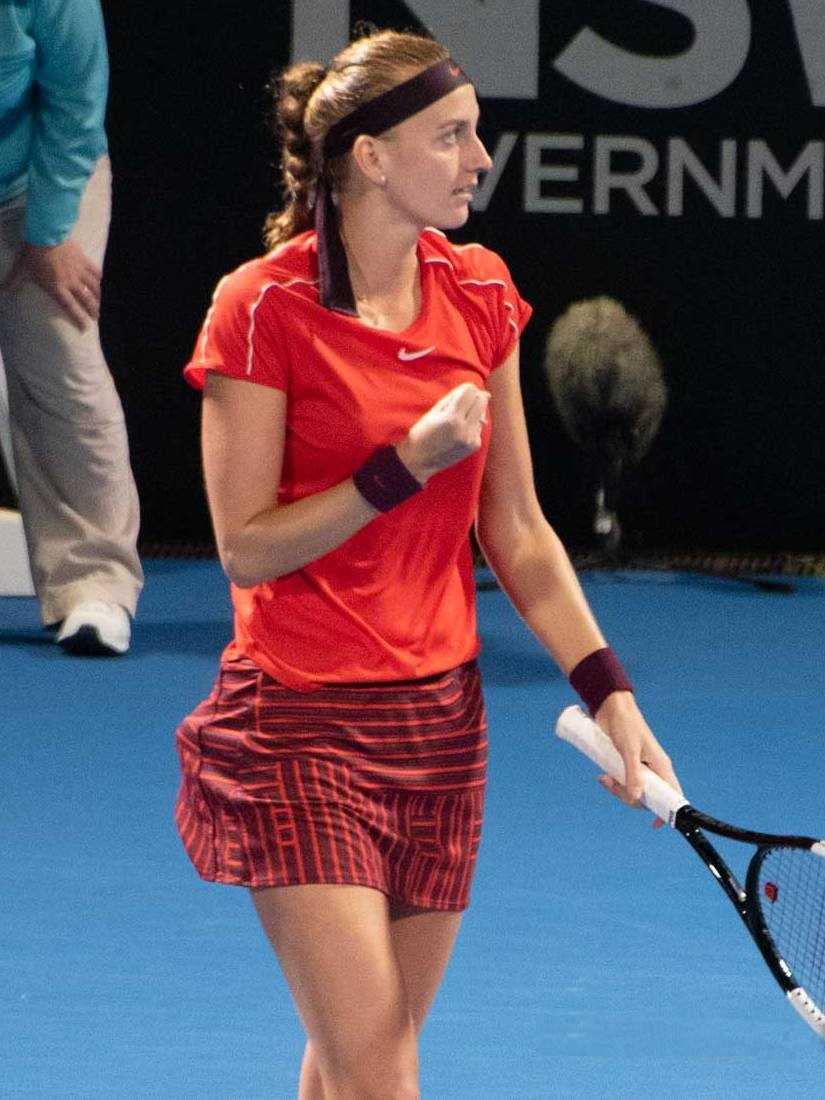
Kvitová at the 2019 Sydney International

Kvitová started the 2019 season in Brisbane. She advanced through the first round after defeating Danielle Collins in a match that lasted over three hours, before losing to Anett Kontaveit in the second round. She then claimed her second title in Sydney. She defeated Aryna Sabalenka and Hsieh Su-wei to reach her first quarterfinal on Australian soil since winning here in 2015. There, she beat defending champion Angelique Kerber and then moved past Aliaksandra Sasnovich to book her place in the final. There, she came back from a set down to defeat Ashleigh Barty, winning her 26th career title.

As the eighth seed at the Australian Open, Kvitová cruised into the quarterfinals without dropping a set, recording wins over Magdaléna Rybáriková, Irina-Camelia Begu, Belinda Bencic and Amanda Anisimova. Her win over Bencic saw her through to the second week here for the first time since 2012, and for the first time at a Grand Slam outside the US Open since the 2015 French Open. In the quarterfinals, she moved past Barty in straight sets and then beat Collins in straight sets to advance to her first Grand Slam final since 2014, and her first outside Wimbledon. There, she faced fourth seed Naomi Osaka, with the world No. 1 ranking at stake. After losing the first-set tiebreak, Kvitová made a big comeback during the second set after facing three championship points on her own serve. She then won four consecutive games to claim the set. However, Osaka recovered from this turnaround, breaking Kvitová early in the decider en route to claiming victory. Nevertheless, Kvitová returned to the world No. 2 ranking for the first time since June 2015 after the tournament's conclusion.

The following week, Kvitová competed in St. Petersburg where she was the defending champion, defeating Victoria Azarenka in her opener to reach the quarterfinals where she lost to Donna Vekić. At the Dubai Tennis Championships, Kvitová recorded consecutive wins here for the first time since 2013, beating both Kateřina Siniaková and Jennifer Brady in three sets to reach the quarterfinals, where saw off Viktória Kužmová in straight sets. In the last four, she edged past Hsieh to reach the final where she succumbed to Bencic in three sets. The loss marked the first time since 2013 where Kvitová lost back-to-back finals. She then lost her opening match at the Indian Wells Open, coming up short in a tight three-setter to Venus Williams. She then competed in Miami, where she was seeded third, beating Maria Sakkari, 26th seed Vekić and 19th seed Caroline Garcia to return to her second quarterfinal of the tournament. There, she succumbed to 12th seed Barty in three sets.

Kvitová began her clay court season in Stuttgart where she became the first player to win two titles in 2019. Seeded third, she saw off the likes of Greet Minnen, seventh seed Anastasija Sevastova and sixth seed Kiki Bertens en route to the final, where she beat eighth seed Kontaveit in straight sets for her overall 27th career title. She was the defending champion at the Madrid Open and made the last eight where she lost to eventual champion Bertens, in a rematch of last year's final, in straight sets. At the Italian Open, her first appearance here since 2016, Kvitová made the third round where she faced Sakkari but retired with an injured calf while trailing in the decider. She then pulled out of the French Open with an arm injury, bringing her clay court swing to a premature close. Returning to competition at Wimbledon after a six-week layoff, sixth-seeded Kvitová cruised to the fourth round, her first appearance in the second week here since winning the title in 2014, thus making multiple second week appearances at the Grand Slams for the first time since 2015. There, she lost to 19th seed Johanna Konta in three sets.

During the summer, Kvitová was forced to withdraw from the Canadian Open to recover from the arm injury that had been plaguing her the past two months. She returned to action in Cincinnati where she fell in her opener to Sakkari in three sets. This was followed by a loss to Andrea Petkovic in the second round of the US Open, her earliest loss at the tournament since 2011. However, she bounced back with strong results during the Asian swing. In Wuhan, she sailed to the last four by scoring wins over Polona Hercog, Sloane Stephens and Dayana Yastremska, all in straight sets, but was then stopped by Alison Riske. The following week in Beijing, she recorded her fifth quarterfinal appearance at the tournament, after defeating Mladenovic and ninth seed Bencic, both in straight sets, where she succumbed to world No. 1 Barty in three sets.

On 7 October, Kvitová was announced as the sixth qualifier for the WTA Finals. Seeded sixth at the tournament, also her seventh appearance here, the most of any player this decade, however, Kvitová suffered a winless outing for the second year in a row, with losses to Osaka, Bencic and Barty, thus crashing out in the round-robin stage. The result also saw Kvitová's losing streak at the tournament, dating back to her loss in the 2015 final to Agnieszka Radwańska, extended to seven matches. She also became the only player this decade to suffer multiple winless appearances at the tournament, the first since Elena Dementieva, in 2004, 2005 and 2006. Kvitova maintained her year-end ranking from the previous year, world No. 7, tying Caroline Wozniacki and Serena Williams for most top-10 season finishes this decade, seven seasons. Furthermore, she was awarded the Karen Krantzcke Sportsmanship Award for the seventh year running, her eighth overall, and ties Kim Clijsters for most Sportsmanship Award wins.

=== 2020: Grand Slam tournament renaissance ===
Kvitová began 2020 at the Brisbane International. Seeded fifth, she scored back-to-back wins here for the first time in three appearances, and recorded her best result here since winning the title in 2011, by making the semifinals where she lost to eighth seed Madison Keys in three sets. She then made the quarterfinals of the Australian Open with wins over Kateřina Siniaková, Paula Badosa, 25th seed Ekaterina Alexandrova and 22nd seed Maria Sakkari. The result saw Kvitová record consecutive quarterfinal appearances at the same Grand Slam tournament for the first since the 2014 Wimbledon Championships. It also meant that for the first time since 2015, she has made a Grand Slam quarterfinal in a season in consecutive years. There, however, she succumbed to world No. 1, Ashleigh Barty, in straight sets, her fourth consecutive defeat to the Aussie, which also handed the top-ranked player her first win over a top-10 opponent at the Grand Slams. Having failed to defend her runner-up result here from a year ago, Kvitová dropped out of the top 10, for the first time since February 2018.

Kvitová then made the quarterfinals at St. Petersburg, after overcoming Alison van Uytvanck in her opener in three sets, thus making at least the quarterfinal stage in her first three tournaments of the season for the first time since 2011. There, however, she conceded a walkover to Alexandrova due to illness. Kvitová's final tournament appearance, before the suspension of the tour in March due to the COVID-19 pandemic, was in Doha where she was the eighth seed. There, she clinched a spot in her second final here after defeating the likes of Carla Suárez Navarro, Jeļena Ostapenko, Ons Jabeur and world No. 1 Barty, ending a four-match losing streak against the latter. However, she succumbed to ninth seed Aryna Sabalenka in the championship match in straight sets, making it the tenth runner-up finish of her career, and the first time she lost consecutive finals at the Premier Mandatory/5 level. Further suspensions to the 2020 season followed, the latest one lasting till end of July.

However, in spite of the suspensions, Kvitová made her unofficial return to the sport in May at an all-Czech exhibition event held in Prague, where she beat the likes of Barbora Krejčíková, Siniaková and Karolína Muchová to lift the title. In July, she followed up with appearances in the final of both legs of another exhibition event in Berlin, one on grass and another on an indoor hardcourt. She lost both finals from a set up, to Elina Svitolina in the former and Anastasija Sevastova in the latter.

Returning to competition in August at the Cincinnati tournament, held in New York City this year due to the ongoing COVID-19 pandemic, Kvitová lost her opening match to compatriot Marie Bouzková in three sets. She then made the fourth round at the US Open, making it her 20th appearance in the second week at the Grand Slams. There, however, she succumbed in a tight three-setter to Shelby Rogers, despite having four match points. She matched her best result at the French Open after that, defeating Océane Dodin, Jasmine Paolini, Leylah Annie Fernandez, Zhang Shuai and Laura Siegemund, all in straight sets, to reach the last four where she fell to Sofia Kenin in straight sets. Nevertheless, that run saw Kvitová reach multiple Grand Slam quarterfinals in a season for the first time since 2012, and it also guaranteed her return to the top 10 for the first time in nine months.

Kvitová would then shut down her 2020 season after the French Open, and this meant that for the first time since 2010, she did not win a title during a season, her best showing this year being the runner-up finish to Sabalenka in Doha. Nevertheless, she finished the year ranked world No. 8, her eighth overall year-end ranking inside the top 10.

=== 2021: Titles across three decades and struggles with form ===
Kvitová kicked off her 2021 season at the Yarra Valley Classic where she was seeded fourth, defeating Venus Williams in straight sets in her opening match before falling to 14th seed Nadia Podoroska in the following round in three sets. Kvitová was seeded ninth at the 2021 Australian Open, but fell at the second hurdle to Sorana Cîrstea in three sets. She then competed in Doha where she was seeded fourth, receiving a bye in the first round. She kicked off her campaign with a win over Anastasia Pavlyuchenkova to make the last eight where she saw off Anett Kontaveit in three sets. She then beat Jessica Pegula to reach her third final here, a rematch of the 2018 final, against Garbiñe Muguruza. In huge contrast to the former encounter, Kvitová won easily this time, dropping just three games in windy conditions to sail to her 28th career title. This meant that Kvitová has now won titles across three decades, dating back to her maiden career title at Hobart in January 2009, also becoming the first player male or female born in the 1990s to achieve that feat. The following week in Dubai, however, she was forced to retire in her opener against Jil Teichmann due to a thigh injury. Later that month, Kvitová made the fourth round at the Miami Open after seeing off Alizé Cornet and 17th seed Johanna Konta before succumbing to fifth seed Elina Svitolina from a set up.

Opening her season's campaign on clay in Charleston, Kvitová scored her career's maiden win on green clay surface by defeating Aussie Storm Sanders, before falling to eventual runner-up Danka Kovinić in the next round, in straight sets. Then, as the defending champion in Stuttgart, she saw off the likes of top-20 oppositions in Jennifer Brady and Maria Sakkari to reach the quarterfinals where she was stopped by Svitolina despite having led by a set, once again, and having two match points this time around. She then advanced past Marie Bouzková, Angelique Kerber and Veronika Kudermetova to make her sixth quarterfinal in Madrid where she lost to world No. 1 Ashleigh Barty in three sets. Then, in Rome, Kvitová was inflicted her first defeat to a player ranked outside the top 100 for the first time in more than three years when she lost to Vera Zvonareva in the second round. At the French Open, 11th-seeded Kvitová saved a match point in the first round against Greet Minnen en route to a win from a set down but then was forced to withdraw from the tournament due to an ankle injury sustained during media duties there.

She would return to action three weeks later at the inaugural Bad Homburg Open, her first tournament on grass courts since Wimbledon two years ago. Seeded first, Kvitová made a semifinal run with wins over Katarzyna Piter, Ann Li and fifth seed Podoroska. She lost in the last four to fourth seed Kerber in three sets, despite having led by a set and a break. At Wimbledon, however, Kvitová was sent packing in the opening round by fellow Grand Slam champion Sloane Stephens in straight sets, and it marked the 10th occasion in her career where she fell at the first hurdle at the Grand Slams. On home soil, at the Prague Open, Kvitová rode a three-match losing streak for the first time since the tour suspension was lifted last summer, when she tumbled out in the opening round to Slovak Rebecca Šramková in three sets.

Kvitová then recorded her fourth appearance at the Summer Olympics, her third in the singles discipline, and was selected as co-flag bearer alongside basketball player Tomáš Satoranský. In tennis competition, she saw off Italy's Jasmine Paolini in her opener before taking her earliest loss at the event, in the hands of Belgian Alison van Uytvanck in the second round, besides being inflicted her first bagel set at the Games in the process. The following month, Kvitová returned during the North American summer swing and opened with a loss to eventual champion Camila Giorgi in the third round of Montreal. She then reached her third quarterfinal in Cincinnati, her most of such showings at a WTA 1000 event in North America, and best result in more than three months, where she faced Kerber but was forced to retire down a set due to a stomach issue. At the US Open, 10th seed Kvitová recorded back-to-back wins at the majors for the first time this year, to reach the third round where she was beaten by 17th seed and eventual semifinalist Sakkari in straight sets. The loss marked the second time in her career she did not reach a second week at the Grand Slams, after 2018.

Kvitová made two more appearances before closing her 2021 season, in Ostrava and Indian Wells, and made the last four in the former where she lost to eventual champion Kontaveit before bowing out in the third round of the latter to eventual runner-up Victoria Azarenka, both defeats coming in straight sets. She ended 2021 ranked world No. 17, her first top-20 finish since 2016 and second of her career in total.

=== 2022: Early struggles, out of top 30 and resurgence ===
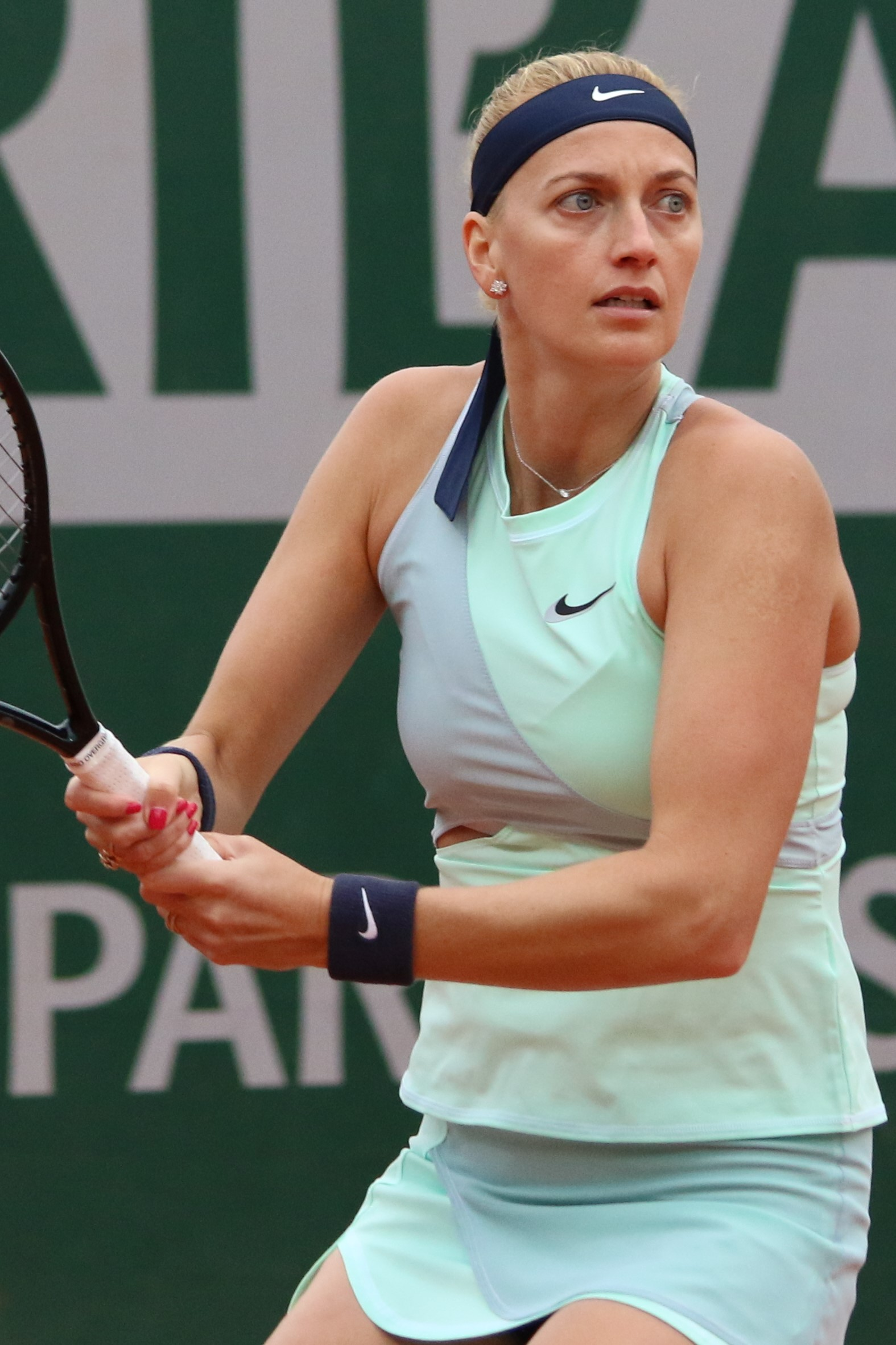
Kvitová at the 2022 French Open

Kvitová opened 2022 with a debut showing in Adelaide where she was unseeded, and drew local Aussie Priscilla Hon in the opening round, but crashed out in three sets, despite having led by a set and a break. She then saved two match points to beat Arantxa Rus in the first round of Sydney, but then lost to Ons Jabeur in straight sets. Kvitová was the 20th seed at the Australian Open, her first seeding in the 17–24 range at the Grand Slams, but took another early loss to Romania's Sorana Cîrstea for the second year running, this time in the first round.

Her recent struggles continued into February with a loss to another Romanian, this time a first-ever loss to Irina-Camelia Begu, in the second round of St. Petersburg. She then reached the quarterfinals in Dubai after seeing off Camila Giorgi and world No. 2 Aryna Sabalenka, the latter being her first top 10 win in nearly two years. In the last eight, however, she came up short to eventual champion Jeļena Ostapenko in three sets, despite having served for the match twice, and having a match point under her belt. The following week in Doha, defending champion Kvitová retired to 16th seed Elise Mertens in the second round due to a wrist inflammation. As a result, she exited the top 30 for the first time since January 2011. After yet another early loss in Indian Wells in the third round to the eventual runner-up, this time in Maria Sakkari, Kvitová recorded her best result in more than six months with a third quarterfinal showing in Miami, defeating Clara Burel, Lauren Davis and 21st seed Veronika Kudermetova along the way. There, she lost to incoming world No. 1 Iga Świątek in straight sets.

Kvitová opened her season on clay with a couple of first-round exits, in Charleston and Stuttgart, the former via retirement – making it her first losing streak on this surface at the tour level since 2018 when she also lost her opening matches in the same two tournaments. Her losing streak was extended to four, her first such since end of 2019, when she crashed out in the opening round of Madrid to Jil Teichmann, her earliest exit here since 2010. Kvitová's string of recent poor results saw her ranking fall to a 12-year low of world No. 34 after Madrid, which is also her equal-lowest ranking since January 2011. At the French Open, 32nd seed Kvitová scored her season's maiden win on clay when she beat Hungary's Anna Bondár in the first round, also making it her 30th victory of the tournament. However, she lost in the next round to Daria Saville in straight sets.

Kvitová began her season on grass with a loss to an in-form Beatriz Haddad Maia in her opening match at Birmingham. However, she bounced back from her third losing streak of the season by lifting her first title in Eastbourne the following week. En route to her second final here, 14th-seeded Kvitová saw off Donna Vekic and Katie Boulter in her first two matches, before dispatching Harriet Dart to return to the last four here for the first time since 2011. There, she avenged her Birmingham defeat to 15th seed Haddad Maia and in the championship round next, denied the eighth seed and defending champion Ostapenko a completed title defence – by winning the final in straight sets to collect her fifth title on the surface and also the 29th of her career. At Wimbledon, 25th seed Kvitová prevailed over Jasmine Paolini and Ana Bogdan to reach the third round here for just the third time since she last won the title in 2014. There, however, she succumbed to fourth seed Paula Badosa in a tight straight-set defeat – making it the third consecutive edition of Wimbledon where she lost on Centre Court. Nevertheless, Kvitová ended her 2022 grass exploits with seven wins on the surface, her highest such count since 2014.

During the North American summer stretch, an unseeded Kvitová exited the Canadian Open at the first hurdle, her earliest defeat here since 2010, in the hands of Alison Riske-Amritraj. The following week in Cincinnati, however, her form improved as she exacted revenge against the likes of Teichmann, Cirstea and fifth seed Jabeur to reach the last eight. In her fourth quarterfinal showing here, also her fourth overall in 2022, Kvitová defeated Ajla Tomljanović on their debut encounter. In the semifinals, she defeated former champion Madison Keys, in their ninth meeting in total and a rematch of their opening-round clash here last year, to move to her 40th career final and her first in North America since New Haven seven years ago. In the final, she was swept aside by qualifier Caroline Garcia in straight sets, in what was their ninth overall meeting, and a rematch of their second-round encounter here seven years ago. The runner-up finish was the 11th of Kvitová's career and she has now lost her last three WTA 1000 finals in succession.

At the US Open, 21st seed Kvitová scored her first win over a top 10 player at the majors in five years when she saved match points to beat ninth seed Garbiñe Muguruza in the third round – a rematch of their last 16 meeting here in 2017 which was also the aforementioned Kvitová win over a top 10 player at this level. The victory earned herself the 600th win of her career across all levels, besides placing her in her first second week appearance at the Grand Slams in two years. In the next round, however, she lost to Jessica Pegula in straight sets. It meant that for the first time since 2009, Kvitová did not reach a quarterfinal at the Grand Slams in two consecutive years. Nevertheless, owing to her strong results over the past three months, Kvitová saw her ranking return to the top 20 for the first time since January this year.

Kvitová returned from a month's break in October, firstly on home soil at the Ostrava Open where she returned to the quarterfinals here, for the second year running, her fifth such result of the season, and 99th of her career, but suffered defeat in the hands of fellow Wimbledon champion Elena Rybakina. In her last tournament of the year, seeded 16th in her debut at the Guadalajara Open, she bowed out in the second round to fellow Grand Slam champion Bianca Andreescu from a set up. The result also meant that for the third year in a row, in her last tournament of the season, Kvitová lost to a fellow Grand Slam champion. Nevertheless, Kvitová would go on to rise to her best ranking of the season, also her year-end ranking, at world No. 16, effectively improving her ranking by more than a half, dating back to summer earlier in the season. Amassing 27 wins out of 46 matches played, the 2022 season also marked the first time since 2010 where Kvitová recorded a season winning rate of less than 60%.

=== 2023: Biggest title in five years and return to top 10 ===
Kicking off the 2023 season in a team event for the first time since 2014, Kvitová amassed two straight-set wins in singles at the inaugural United Cup. Firstly, she beat world No. 3 Jessica Pegula to open her season with her 30th career win over an opponent ranked in the top 5, and it was also the Czech Republic's sole win in its opening tie against the United States. She next beat Laura Siegemund to give the Czechs an unassailable 3–0 advantage in its tie against Germany, effectively securing her nation its first tie win of the tournament. She then recorded her maiden quarterfinal appearance in Adelaide, her 100th career quarterfinal result in main draws, but lost to Daria Kasatkina, also making it her first defeat in the quarterfinal stage of an Australian tournament outside the Australian Open. Seeded 15th at the Australian Open, Kvitová exited in the second round to Anhelina Kalinina in a tight straight-setter, making it the 10th time in her career where she failed to reach the second week here.

In February, Kvitová suffered consecutive last-16 exits, coming in Doha and Dubai – the first time since 2016 where she failed to reach a quarterfinal in the Middle East. The following month, in Indian Wells, 15th seed Kvitová claimed back-to-back wins here for the first time since 2016 by defeating Elizabeth Mandlik, before recovering from a first-set bagel to prevail over 24th seed Jeļena Ostapenko to reach the round of 16. There, she scored her second win in three months over world No. 3 Pegula, needing to save four match points this time around. She would fall to seventh seed Maria Sakkari in her third quarterfinal appearance here next – a rematch of their third-round encounter of the previous year which Sakkari also won.

At the Miami Open, 15th seed Kvitová carried on with her good form by defeating the likes of compatriot Linda Nosková, 22nd seed Donna Vekić (her third such meeting against Vekić to have come in the third round of Miami – all of which have been won by Kvitová) and Varvara Gracheva to make the last eight here for a second year in a row hence also reaching back-to-back quarterfinals in Indian Wells and Miami in the same season for the first time in her career. Kvitová broke new ground next by advancing into her first semifinal at the tournament by defeating 18th seed Ekaterina Alexandrova. It is also the milestone 20th semifinal overall of her career at WTA 1000 events. In the semifinals, she beat Sorana Cirstea in straight sets to reach the final, where she stopped 10th seed Elena Rybakina from completing the Sunshine Double, by winning the title match in straight sets – for the milestone 30th title of her career, her ninth to have come at WTA 1000 events and also her biggest one since Madrid 2018. With the result, Kvitová returned to the top 10 for the first time since September 2021.

Kvitová's clay season in 2023 marked the first time she failed to record a single win on the surface upon her exit from the French Open. She withdrew from two events Stuttgart and Rome injured, and went winless in her other two appearances on the surface, namely, Madrid and the French Open – falling to Jule Niemeier and Elisabetta Cocciaretto respectively. The latter defeat was Kvitová's first loss in the first hurdle in Paris since 2010 where she lost to Sophie Ferguson – and it also meant she had failed to reach a single quarterfinal in her last 10 appearances at the Grand Slams, dating back to the 2021 Australian Open. Nevertheless, Kvitová rose to world No. 9 following the French Open, her first single-digit ranking since the fortnight of the 2021 Australian Open.

She then turned her clay misfortunes around by starting the grass season with her first title on this surface outside the United Kingdom, capturing her 31st career title at the German Open. En route, seventh-seeded Kvitová saw off Karolína Plíšková and Nadia Podoroska, both in straight sets, to reach the quarterfinals. Next, she claimed consecutive straight-set wins over third seed Caroline Garcia and Alexandrova, both coming on the same day, to reach the final. There, Kvitová defeated Vekić in straight sets for the third time in the past 12 months, thus winning a title without the loss of a set for the first time since 2016. Her win over Garcia also marked her first on grass coming over an opponent ranked in the top 10 since the 2011 Wimbledon final where she beat Maria Sharapova. At Wimbledon, Kvitová was the ninth seed and went up against Jasmine Paolini in the opening round here for the second year in a row. Playing on the date of the ninth anniversary of her second title here this time, Kvitová won the match in three sets again, just like the year before. The win also marked Kvitová's 10th at this event since winning her second title here in 2014, and the 10th of her career to have come on Centre Court here. She then dispatched both Aliaksandra Sasnovich and Natalija Stevanović in straight sets to reach the second week. There, Kvitová lost to sixth seed Ons Jabeur in the last 16 – making it her 10th overall defeat, both in this stage at the Grand Slams, and at all Grand Slams since the 2020 season.

Kvitová suffered a majority of losses in her remaining five tournament appearances of the year, failing to win consecutive matches in all instances. Firstly, in the American summer swing, she logged in just two wins, one in each of the Canadian and Cincinnati Opens. Next, at the US Open, where 11th seed Kvitová recorded her 50th consecutive appearance at the Grand Slams as a seeded player – having never missed out on a seeding at this stage of competition since her first such at this same event in 2010, she lost in the second round in straight sets to familiar nemesis and now a returning mother in Caroline Wozniacki. The loss also meant that Kvitová has failed to reach a single quarterfinal at the Grand Slams for the third season in a row, with her last such result being 2020 French Open where she was a semifinalist.

At her next tournament, her first ever appearance in China since the pandemic, second seed Kvitová reached the last eight in Ningbo Open, having defeated Anna-Lena Friedsam at the first hurdle before receiving a walkover from Yulia Putintseva, but then lost to eventual finalist Diana Shnaider in three sets. In her last tournament of 2023, at the China Open, Kvitová prevailed over Wang Xiyu in the first round in a late-night tussle lasting just over three hours. However, the following day, she succumbed in straight sets to eventual finalist Liudmila Samsonova. The loss made 2023 the third season in a row where Kvitová's last tournament of the season saw her lost in the last 32 of a WTA 1000 event. She finished 2023 ranked world No. 14 – making it her third top-20 finish in succession as well as the first time since 2010 where she concluded more than two seasons in a row ranked outside the top 10.

=== 2025: Comeback from maternity and retirement ===
Having not played at all in 2024 due to pregnancy and the birth of her first child, Kvitová announced on 3 February 2025, that she intended to return to competition later that month at the ATX Open in Austin, Texas. There, she lost from a set-up against Jodie Burrage in the first round.

The following month during the Sunshine Double, Kvitová was given wildcards into the main draws at the Indian Wells and Miami Open. However, she also fell at the first hurdle of both tournaments to Varvara Gracheva and Sofia Kenin, respectively.

Kvitová then received another wildcard entry into the Madrid Open, but again lost her opening match, this time to Katie Volynets in straight sets in spite of having had a 4–1 lead in the first set.

Using her protected ranking at her next tournament, the Italian Open, Kvitová finally got her first win since returning from maternity leave by defeating Irina-Camelia Begu in the opening round. However, she withdrew before her next match against Ons Jabeur due to a right lower leg injury.

To close out the clay-court season, Kvitová used her protected ranking to enter the French Open, for her first appearance at a major since her comeback, but lost in her opening match to Viktorija Golubic despite having won the first set.

Opening her grass-court season at the Queen's Club Championships in London, Kvitová once again was eliminated in her opening match despite taking the first set, this time at the hands of Beatriz Haddad Maia. Two days later, on 19 June, she announced her intention to retire from professional tennis after the US Open later in the summer.

As a wildcard entrant at Wimbledon, Kvitová drew 10th seed Emma Navarro in the first round, and lost her final match on grass in straight sets.

Kvitová played her final professional match at the US Open, losing to Diane Parry in the first round, managing to win just one game in the 52-minute encounter.

== Playing style ==
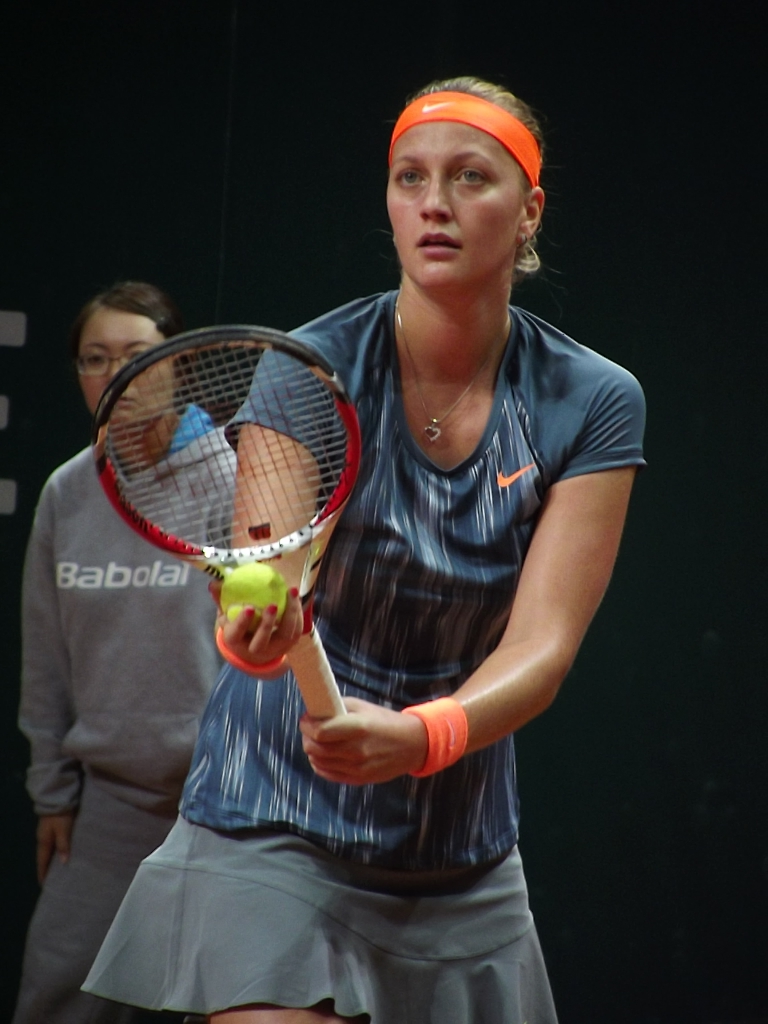
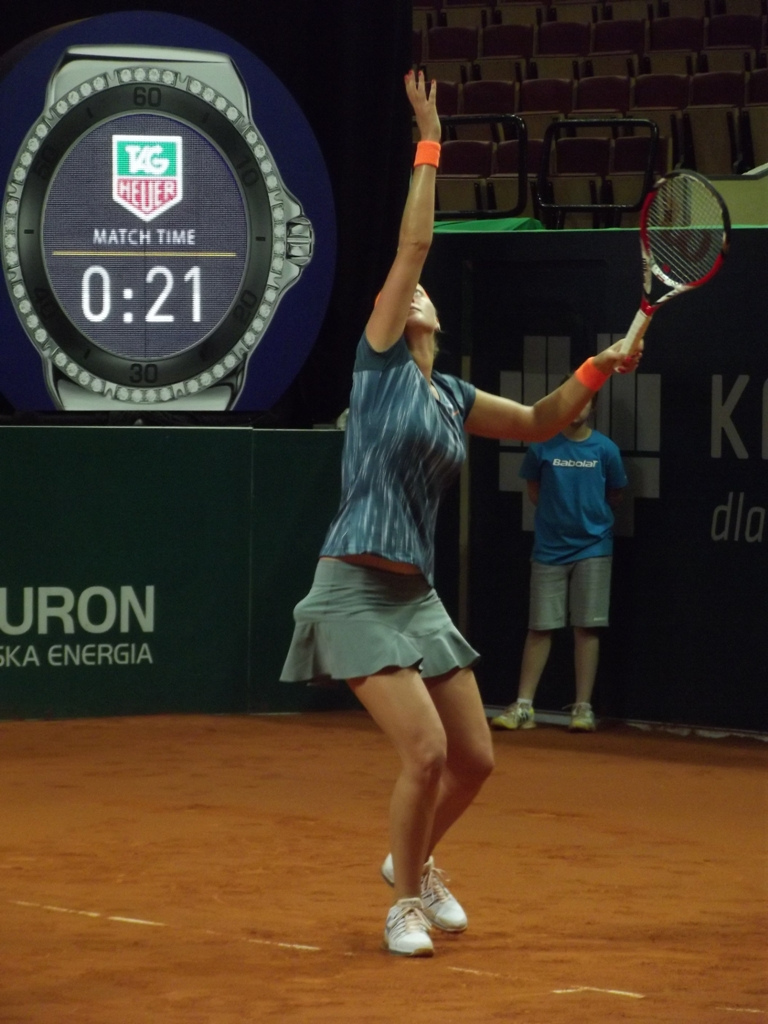
Kvitová's service motion

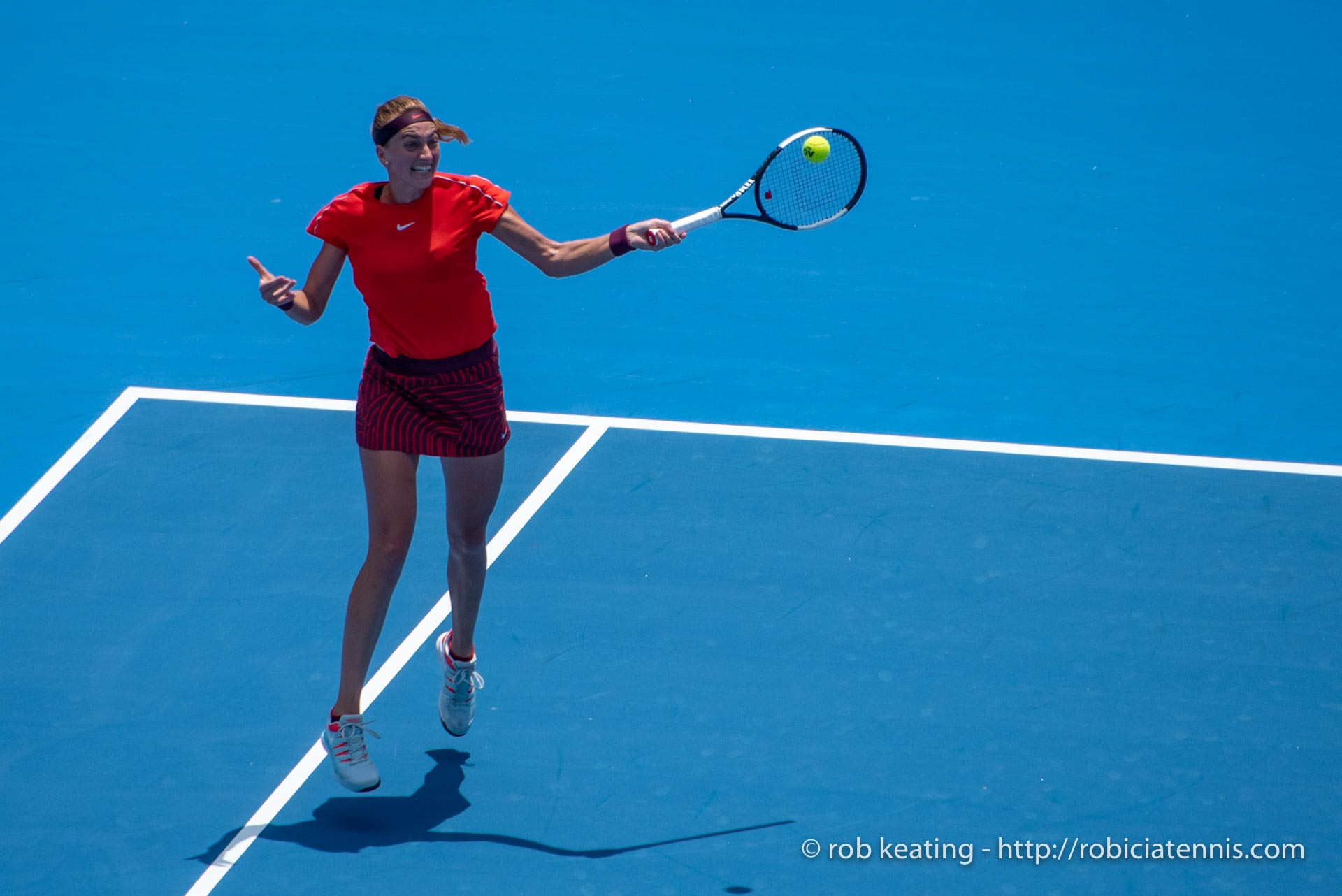
Kvitová hitting a forehand

Kvitová uses the pinpoint service stance and is known for her fast and well-placed serves. As a left-handed player, she executes the shot well by serving out wide away from her opponent, especially on the advantage-side of the court to her opponent's backhand, and then coming forward to finish off the point with a winner down the line. She is also noted for her exceptional timing. On forehands, she prefers to take the ball early, thus allowing her to produce down-the-line winners effectively. On backhands, she utilizes all the important muscle groups to produce shots with exceptional amount of power. When returning, she uses a short compact motion which allows her to return aggressively regardless of the serve speed. She is also known to attack weak second serves by producing powerful winners. She also possesses notable amount of variety in her game. Her volleys tend to come more from her forehand, her stronger side, which she executes by moving her racket in a straight line, also allowing her to disguise the shot well enough from her opponents. In the slice department, she has the ability to keep the ball low and performs the shot better on her backhand wing. Due to her tall frame, she is known to make up for her lack of speed by playing close to the baseline. Her game suits the fast courts and she cites grass as her favourite surface.

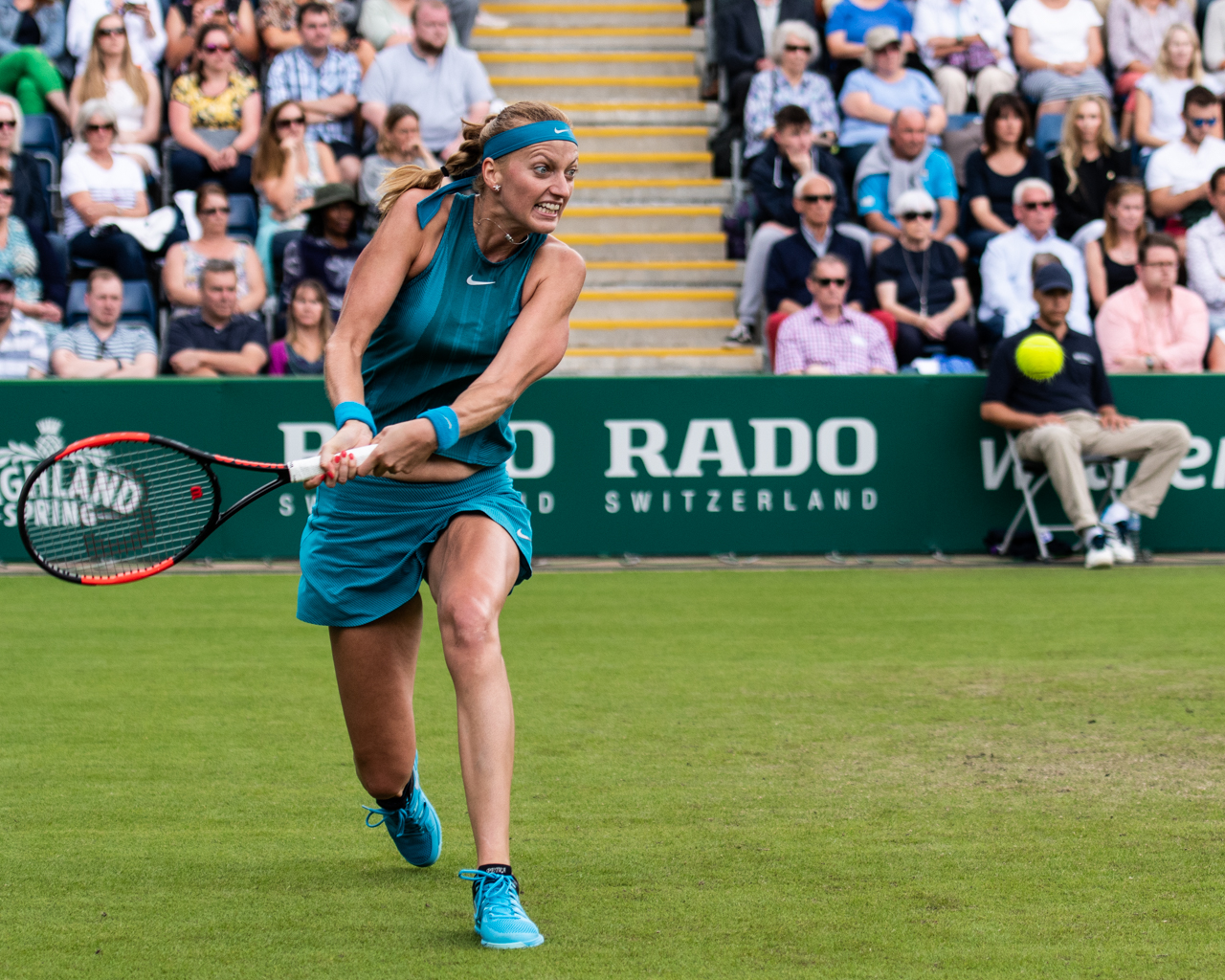
Kvitová hitting a backhand

However, due to her high-risk game and aggressive style of play she is known to produce a high number of unforced errors in matches. Movement is another weakness in her game though it has shown significant improvement over the last couple of years as she is now able to run down more balls than before. She is known for her inconsistencies, inability to maintain focus during matches as well as impatience mid-rally. Kvitová sometimes struggles against defensive players, including Angelique Kerber, Simona Halep and Elina Svitolina, who prolong points to the extent that Kvitová feels she must hit a winner, thus increasing the chances of producing an unforced error. Against such opponents, she has been shown to break down physically due to her opponent's use of court craft, consistency and patience on court.

However, when Kvitová is at her best, she is extremely dangerous, as seen in the final of the 2015 Madrid Open against Svetlana Kuznetsova where she hit 33 winners in the 66-minute contest, an average of a winner every two minutes, which is more than double her unforced error count of 14 too. Another similar illustration was witnessed in the final of the 2014 Wimbledon Championships against Eugenie Bouchard where Kvitová fired 28 winners in 55 minutes, against just 12 unforced errors, to lift her second major title.

== Rivalries ==
=== Kvitová vs. Kerber ===
Kvitová and Angelique Kerber have met 16 times, with the head-to-head currently tied at 8–8. Their first three meetings came in 2012, the first in Stuttgart where Kvitová won in straight sets. Kerber then won their two next clashes in the quarterfinals of Rome and the semifinals of Cincinnati, both in three sets.

Kvitová followed up with three consecutive wins in their next meetings – in the final of the Pan Pacific Open and the round-robin stage of the WTA Tour Championships, both in 2013, and the Fed Cup final in 2014, all in three sets. That same winning streak then turned to Kerber's favour – in the round-robin stage of the WTA Finals in 2015, the semifinals of Stuttgart and the fourth round of the US Open, the latter two in 2016.

In their tenth clash, in the third round of Wuhan in 2016, Kvitová edged past Kerber in three sets in a match that lasted over three-and-a-half hours, which is also their longest match to date. Then, in the semifinals of the Fed Cup in 2018, Kvitová saw off Kerber in straight sets, her first such win over the German since their first meeting, only for Kerber to exact revenge in their opening-round clash in Stuttgart a few days later. Kvitová has since won their next two meetings, firstly in the last eight of Sydney in 2019, and then in the second round of Madrid in 2021, both in straight sets, the latter being Kvitová's first win over Kerber on clay outdoors.

Their fifteenth encounter came much later in 2021, on grass in Bad Homburg, their first meeting on the surface, and fifth to take place in Germany. This time, Kerber exacted revenge by coming back from a set and a break deficit to prevail over Kvitová. They next met in August 2021, in the quarterfinals of the Western & Southern Open, where Kvitová had to retire in the second set due to illness. Kerber subsequently went on maternity leave in August 2022, before returning to the sport in January 2024, and then finally retiring in July that same year.

=== Kvitová vs. Wozniacki ===
Kvitová and Caroline Wozniacki met 15 times. Kvitová leads the head-to-head 8–7. They played each other at least once a year, from their first meeting in 2009 up until 2018.

Their first meeting came in the second round of the 2009 Swedish Open with Wozniacki winning comfortably. The following year, in the first round of the Madrid Open, Wozniacki beat Kvitová once again. Two months later, Kvitová scored her first win over Wozniacki in the fourth round of the Wimbledon Championships, winning with the loss of just two games. At the end of the year, the two met in the third round of the China Open where Wozniacki beat Kvitová comfortably once more and ensured herself the world No. 1 ranking as a result.

Kvitová then proceeded to win their next three clashes – in the round-robin stage of the 2011 WTA Tour Championships, Montreal semifinals in 2012 and Dubai semifinals in 2013. Wozniacki exacted revenge by winning their next two meetings – in the third round of Cincinnati in 2013 and the round-robin stage of the 2014 WTA Finals.

After that, Kvitová won their next four meetings in a row, all on hard courts – the semifinals of New Haven in 2015, second round of the Rio Olympics in 2016, third round of Beijing in 2017 and the semifinals of Doha in 2018, whereby in the latter where Wozniacki served for the match twice. Wozniacki next ended the losing streak with a win in the round robin stage of the 2018 WTA Finals where she edged past Kvitová in three sets, and it would be their final meeting before Wozniacki retired in 2020 after the Australian Open.

Wozniacki returned to the sport in 2023 at the Canadian Open, and the pair would resume their rivalry weeks later, in the second round of the US Open. There, Wozniacki upset 11th seed Kvitová in straight sets, which was also the best win of Wozniacki's career in terms of ranking since their previous clash at the WTA Finals nearly five years ago.

=== Kvitová vs. Radwańska ===
Kvitová and Agnieszka Radwańska met 13 times. Kvitová leads the head-to-head 8–5. Kvitová dominated the early stages of their rivalry, winning five of their first six clashes. Their first meeting came in the semifinals of the 2009 Linz Open which Kvitová won in straight sets. Their next two encounters came in 2011, the first in quarterfinals of Eastbourne where Kvitová came back from a set down to beat Radwańska, and then in the round-robin stage of the WTA Tour Championships which Kvitová won in straight sets. A year later, also in the round-robin stage of the WTA Tour Championships, Radwańska scored her first win over Kvitová, thus exacting revenge for her loss from a year ago by winning comfortably in straight sets.

Kvitová then went on to win their next two clashes in straight sets – in the quarterfinals of Dubai and the round-robin stage of the WTA Tour Championships, both in 2013. At the 2014 WTA Finals, Radwańska won their round-robin match easily, only for Kvitová to avenge the loss in the semifinals of New Haven the following year. Radwańska followed up by winning their next three encounters – in the final of the 2015 WTA Finals, the quarterfinals of 2016 Indian Wells Open and the semifinals of 2016 Connecticut Open, the latter with the loss of just two games, the most dominant scoreline in all their encounters.

The pair did not meet in 2017, the first time since 2010, and in 2018, Kvitová snapped the losing streak by winning their last two clashes – the second round of Doha in three sets, and the opening round of New Haven, their final encounter, in straight sets. Radwańska then retired at the end of 2018.

=== Kvitová vs. Sharapova ===
Kvitová and Maria Sharapova met 11 times. Kvitová trails the head-to-head 4–7. Their first meeting came in the semifinals of Memphis back in 2010, which Sharapova won in straight sets. Kvitová then proceeded to claim her first two wins over the Russian, in the final of the 2011 Wimbledon Championships in straight sets and later that year, in the semifinals of the Pan Pacific Open via retirement.

Sharapova then went on a five-match winning streak – in the semifinals of the Australian Open, the Women's Stuttgart Open and the French Open, all in 2012, and then in 2014, in the quarterfinals of Miami and the final of Beijing. At the 2014 WTA Finals, Kvitová gained her revenge by beating Sharapova in straight sets in their round-robin match, and then scored another win here the following year in the semifinals, both in straight sets. Their final encounter came in the 2015 Fed Cup final, where Sharapova edged past Kvitová in three sets. Sharapova then retired in February 2020.

=== Kvitová vs. Barty ===
Kvitová and Ashleigh Barty met ten times, with the head-to-head levelled at 5–5, in what was described in February 2020 as "the best rivalry at the moment on the WTA Tour". They first met in 2012 at the French Open where, in her maiden Grand Slam main draw appearance, Barty was soundly defeated in straight sets. The pair's next clash came more than five years later, in 2017, in the final of Birmingham where Kvitová came back from a set down to claim the title, before replicating a similar victory in the Sydney final in 2019 to lift the title. They met once more two weeks later in the quarterfinals of the Australian Open where Kvitová moved past Barty in straight sets.

Barty then went on to record her first win against Kvitová two months later in the quarterfinals of the Miami Open. She would proceed with a further three consecutive victories – in the quarterfinals of the 2019 China Open, in the round-robin stage of the 2019 WTA Finals, and in the quarterfinals of the 2020 Australian Open, a rematch of their quarterfinal clash here a year ago, the latter two in straight sets. In the semifinals of the 2020 Qatar Open, Kvitová snapped the losing streak, recording her fifth win over Barty in the process, also her sixth win over a reigning world No. 1, the prior such win coming at the same stage of this tournament against Wozniacki two years back. That win would also remain as Kvitová's most recent win over a player ranked inside the top 10 for the next 24 months.

The following year, Barty levelled the rivalry once more, with a three-set victory in the Madrid Open quarterfinals, the pair's first meeting on clay after nearly nine years, and their third in the last eight of a 1000-level event — which would also prove to be their final encounter. Barty would go on to retire in March 2022.

=== Kvitová vs. Venus Williams ===
Kvitová and Venus Williams have met eight times with Kvitová currently leading the head-to-head 5–3. With the exception of one, all of their encounters have gone to a decider. Their first meeting came in 2008 in the opening round at Memphis where Kvitová shocked then-eighth-ranked Williams for her maiden top-10 career win. Williams exacted revenge four years later in the second round of the Miami Open. Kvitová subsequently went on a three-match winning streak – in the Tokyo semifinals in 2013, the second round of Doha and the third round of the Wimbledon Championships, the latter two in 2014.

Their next two meetings both came in the United States, with Williams emerging victorious on home soil both times, firstly at the 2017 US Open quarterfinals, and then in the second round of the 2019 Indian Wells Open where in the latter, she recovered from a set and double break deficit to come back and win the match. In their most recent encounter, in the second round of the 2021 Yarra Valley Classic, Kvitová exacted revenge by clinching the maiden straight-set win in their head-to-head.

=== Kvitová vs. Li ===
Kvitová and Li Na met seven times. Kvitová trails the head-to-head 3–4. All their encounters came throughout 2011 to 2013, the first being the semifinals of the 2011 Madrid Open which Kvitová won comfortably in straight sets. Later that month, in the fourth round of the French Open, Li exacted revenge by coming back from a set down to beat Kvitová, and would go on to win the title.

The following year, they clashed in the semifinals of Sydney where Li, once more, beat Kvitová despite being a set down, this time denying Kvitová the No. 1 ranking. Later that year, Kvitová scored her second win over Li, in the Montreal final which she won in three sets to snap a 10-month title drought and capture her first title of 2012.

They met thrice in 2013. They traded wins in the first two, both also coming in the quarterfinal stage, with Li first winning in Stuttgart, and Kvitová exacting revenge in Beijing next. In their final meeting, the semifinals of the WTA Tour Championships, Li saw off Kvitová in straight sets. Li would retire in August the following year.

== Personal life ==
In the past, Kvitová was in relationships with Czech tennis players Adam Pavlásek and later Radek Štěpánek. She began dating Czech hockey player Radek Meidl in June 2014. In December 2015, it was officially announced by the Czech media that the couple were engaged. The news was subsequently confirmed by both Meidl and Kvitová. The couple split in May 2016.

In August 2021, it was reported that Kvitová had been seeing her coach Jiří Vaněk, since the early summer of that year. They became engaged in July 2022, and married a year later. On 1 January 2024, Kvitová announced her pregnancy on Instagram. On 7 July 2024, Kvitová gave birth to their son Petr. On 30 March 2026, she gave birth to their twin girls, Emma and Ella.

=== Home invasion and robbery ===
On 20 December 2016, Kvitová was robbed at her apartment in Prostějov, Czech Republic, suffering multiple lacerations to the tendons and nerves on her left hand and fingers while trying to defend herself. She underwent surgery to repair the damage to her hand, and was expected to sit out the next six months in order to fully recover. Three days later, in her first press conference since her surgery, Kvitová revealed that she had regained movement in her left hand.

By March 2017, Kvitová had regained full use of her left hand. Her psychological recovery was also on track, and she had completed fitness training in the Canary Islands. On 23 May 2017, Kvitová announced that she would play the Wimbledon Championships the following month, and would make a last-minute decision, later in the week, on whether to compete at the French Open. Kvitová subsequently confirmed her participation at the latter event, thus marking her return to competition where she defeated American Julia Boserup in her opening match.

In May 2018, it was revealed that a suspect had been taken into custody. More than five months later, a Czech state prosecutor revealed that an unnamed 33-year-old man (later identified as Radim Žondra) had been charged with assault over a knife attack on a woman in Prostějov on 20 December 2016, which matched the date and location of Kvitová's attack. In 2019, Kvitová testified at the trial of the man charged with assaulting her. He was sentenced to eight years in jail. In 2020, an appeals court raised the sentence to 11 years.

== Endorsements ==
Kvitová endorses Nike apparel and footwear. She uses the Wilson Pro Staff 97 racquet, a similar version to Roger Federer's. She has been represented by IMG since 2014. Her other sponsors include UniCredit Bank and Česká pošta, a Czech postal service operator.

Right To Play, a global organisation which focuses on using sports and games to educate and empower children facing adversity, named Kvitová as its Global Athlete Ambassador in January 2015. Three months later, it was announced that Kvitová had signed a multi-year contract with watchmaker Ritmo Mundo. In June 2016, Czech jewelry manufacturer ALO Diamonds entered Kvitová's list of endorsements. In May 2018, it was revealed that she has joined TAG Heuer as an ambassador. Kvitová is also an ambassador for French skincare brand L'Occitane en Provence.

Kvitová was named world's sixth highest-paid female athlete by Forbes in 2015, ranking fifth among tennis players.

== Career statistics ==
=== Grand Slam performance timelines ===
Key
W	F	SF	QF	#R	RR	Q#	DNQ	A	NH

(W) winner; (F) finalist; (SF) semifinalist; (QF) quarterfinalist; (#R) rounds 4, 3, 2, 1; (RR) round-robin stage; (Q#) qualification round; (DNQ) did not qualify; (A) absent; (NH) not held; (SR) strike rate (events won / competed); (W–L) win–loss record.
To avoid confusion and double counting, these charts are updated at the conclusion of a tournament or when the player's participation has ended.

==== Singles ====
Tournament	2007	2008	2009	2010	2011	2012	2013	2014	2015	2016	2017	2018	2019	2020	2021	2022	2023	2024	2025	SR	W–L	Win %
Australian Open	A	Q1	1R	2R	QF	SF	2R	1R	3R	2R	A	1R	F	QF	2R	1R	2R	A	A	0 / 14	26–14	65%
French Open	A	4R	A	1R	4R	SF	3R	3R	4R	3R	2R	3R	A	SF	2R	2R	1R	A	1R	0 / 15	30–14	68%
Wimbledon	A	1R	1R	SF	W	QF	QF	W	3R	2R	2R	1R	4R	NH	1R	3R	4R	A	1R	2 / 16	38–14	73%
US Open	Q2	1R	4R	3R	1R	4R	3R	3R	QF	4R	QF	3R	2R	4R	3R	4R	2R	A	1R	0 / 17	34–17	67%
Win–loss	0–0	3–3	3–3	8–4	14–3	17–4	8–4	11–3	11–4	7–4	6–3	4–4	10–3	12–3	4–3	5–4	5–4	0–0	0–3	2 / 62	128–59	68%

Note: Kvitová withdrew from the 2021 French Open, and received walkovers at the 2013 Wimbledon Championships and 2022 US Open, all before her second round match, and all of which do not officially count as a loss or win.

==== Doubles ====
Tournament	2008	2009	2010	2011	SR	W–L
Australian Open	A	1R	1R	2R	0 / 3	1–3
French Open	A	A	2R	A	0 / 1	1–1
Wimbledon	1R	A	1R	1R	0 / 3	0–3
US Open	1R	1R	1R	A	0 / 3	0–3
Win–loss	0–2	0–2	1–4	1–2	0 / 10	2–10

=== Grand Slam tournament finals ===
==== Singles: 3 (2 titles, 1 runner-up) ====
Result	Year	Championship	Surface	Opponent	Score
Win	2011	Wimbledon	Grass	(Russia) Maria Sharapova	6–3, 6–4
Win	2014	Wimbledon (2)	Grass	(Canada) Eugenie Bouchard	6–3, 6–0
Loss	2019	Australian Open	Hard	(Japan) Naomi Osaka	6–7^{(2–7)}, 7–5, 4–6

=== Year-end championship finals ===
==== Singles: 2 (1 title, 1 runner-up) ====
Result	Year	Championship	Surface	Opponent	Score
Win	2011	WTA Finals, Istanbul	Hard (i)	(Belarus) Victoria Azarenka	7–5, 4–6, 6–3
Loss	2015	WTA Finals, Singapore	Hard (i)	(Poland) Agnieszka Radwańska	2–6, 6–4, 3–6

== Records ==
Time span	Selected records	Players matched
2001–present	Won WTA Finals on debut	Serena Williams; Maria Sharapova; Dominika Cibulková; Ashleigh Barty; Mirra Andreeva
2013	Most three-set match wins in a season (25 wins)	Alone
2016–present	Won WTA Finals and WTA Elite Trophy	Venus Williams; Ashleigh Barty
2016–present	Won both WTA Finals and WTA Elite Trophy on debut	Alone
2018–present	Most Fed Cup titles won by a Czech player (6 titles)	Alone

== Awards ==
2010

- WTA Newcomer of the Year

2011

- WTA Player of the Year
- WTA Most Improved Player of the Year
- Karen Krantzcke Sportsmanship Award
- Fan Favorite Breakthrough Player
- ITF World Champion
- Czech Athlete of the Year
- Czech Athlete Team of the Year – Fed Cup Team

2012

- US Open Series Champion

2013

- Karen Krantzcke Sportsmanship Award

2014

- Diamond Aces Award
- Karen Krantzcke Sportsmanship Award
- Czech Athlete of the Year
- Czech Athlete Team of the Year – Fed Cup Team

2015

- Karen Krantzcke Sportsmanship Award
- Czech Athlete Team of the Year – Fed Cup Team

2016

- Karen Krantzcke Sportsmanship Award
- Fan Favorite Match Of The Year
- Czech Athlete Team of the Year – Fed Cup Team

2017

- US Open Sportsmanship Award
- Karen Krantzcke Sportsmanship Award

2018

- Karen Krantzcke Sportsmanship Award
- Czech Athlete Team of the Year – Fed Cup Team

2019

- Karen Krantzcke Sportsmanship Award

Sporting positions
Preceded by (United States) Serena Williams	US Open Series Champion; 2012	Succeeded by (United States) Serena Williams
Awards
Preceded by (United States) Melanie Oudin	WTA Newcomer of the Year; 2010	Succeeded by (Romania) Irina-Camelia Begu
Preceded by (Belgium) Kim Clijsters	WTA Player of the Year; 2011	Succeeded by (United States) Serena Williams
Preceded by (Italy) Francesca Schiavone	WTA Most Improved Player of the Year; 2011	Succeeded by (Italy) Sara Errani
Preceded by (Russia) Elena Dementieva (Belgium) Kim Clijsters	Karen Krantzcke Sportsmanship Award; 2011; 2013–2019	Succeeded by (Belgium) Kim Clijsters (Czech Republic) Marie Bouzková
Preceded by (Denmark) Caroline Wozniacki	ITF World Champion; 2011	Succeeded by (United States) Serena Williams
Preceded by Martina Sáblíková; Zuzana Hejnová	Czech Athlete of the Year; 2011; 2014	Succeeded by Barbora Špotáková; Zuzana Hejnová
Preceded by (Belarus) Victoria Azarenka	Diamond Aces Award; 2014	Succeeded by (Denmark) Caroline Wozniacki
Olympic Games
Preceded by Lukáš Krpálek	Flagbearer for Czech Republic (with Tomáš Satoranský); Tokyo 2020	Succeeded by Lukáš Krpálek and Marie Horáčková
