= 2012 Wimbledon Championships – Women's singles qualifying =

Women's singles qualifying
- 2012 Wimbledon Championships

Events
Singles	men	women		boys	girls
Doubles	men	women	mixed	boys	girls
WC Singles	men	women	quad
WC Doubles	men	women	quad
Legends	men	women	seniors

Qualification
Singles	men	women
Doubles	men	women
- Wimbledon Championships

Players and pairs who neither have high enough rankings nor receive wild cards may participate in a qualifying tournament held one week before the annual Wimbledon Tennis Championships.

== Seeds ==
1. (Hungary) Melinda Czink (qualified)
2. (Czech Republic) Eva Birnerová (first round)
3. (Spain) Garbiñe Muguruza (second round)
4. (Japan) Misaki Doi (qualifying competition, lucky loser)
5. (Kazakhstan) Sesil Karatantcheva (qualifying competition)
6. (Colombia) Mariana Duque Mariño (first round)
7. (Argentina) Paula Ormaechea (first round)
8. (Switzerland) Stefanie Vögele (second round)
9. (Czech Republic) Karolína Plíšková (qualified)
10. (Australia) Olivia Rogowska (second round)
11. (Spain) Lara Arruabarrena (qualifying competition)
12. (Croatia) Mirjana Lučić (qualified)
13. (France) Claire Feuerstein (qualifying competition)
14. (United States) CoCo Vandeweghe (qualified)
15. (Russia) Valeria Savinykh (qualifying competition)
16. (Japan) Erika Sema (second round)
17. (France) Aravane Rezaï (second round)
18. (Russia) Alla Kudryavtseva (first round)
19. (United States) Julia Cohen (first round)
20. (Austria) Yvonne Meusburger (second round)
21. (Germany) Dinah Pfizenmaier (second round)
22. (Japan) Kurumi Nara (first round)
23. (Romania) Mihaela Buzărnescu (second round)
24. (Netherlands) Bibiane Schoofs (qualifying competition)

== Qualifiers ==
1. (Hungary) Melinda Czink
2. (Germany) Annika Beck
3. (Italy) Maria Elena Camerin
4. (France) Kristina Mladenovic
5. (Poland) Sandra Zaniewska
6. (Serbia) Vesna Dolonc
7. (Slovakia) Jana Čepelová
8. (Czech Republic) Kristýna Plíšková
9. (Czech Republic) Karolína Plíšková
10. (Italy) Camila Giorgi
11. (United States) CoCo Vandeweghe
12. (Croatia) Mirjana Lučić

== Lucky loser ==
1. (Japan) Misaki Doi

== Qualifying draw ==
=== First qualifier ===
First round
1	(Hungary) Melinda Czink	7^{7}	6
(France) Victoria Larrière	6^{1}	4
(Russia) Ekaterina Ivanova	2	6	2
(Portugal) Maria João Koehler	6	3	6
WC	(United Kingdom) Jade Windley	4	2
(Russia) Marta Sirotkina	6	6
(Canada) Heidi El Tabakh	6	4	6
22	(Japan) Kurumi Nara	2	6	3

Second round
1	(Hungary) Melinda Czink	7^{7}	2	8
(Portugal) Maria João Koehler	6^{4}	6	6
(Russia) Marta Sirotkina	7^{7}	6
(Canada) Heidi El Tabakh	6^{3}	3

Qualifying competition
1	(Hungary) Melinda Czink	6	6
(Russia) Marta Sirotkina	3	2

=== Second qualifier ===
First round
2	(Czech Republic) Eva Birnerová	4	2
(Slovenia) Petra Rampre	6	6
(China) Zhang Shuai	5	6	6
(Japan) Junri Namigata	7	2	4
(Bulgaria) Elitsa Kostova	6^{4}	2
(Germany) Annika Beck	7^{7}	6
(Australia) Monique Adamczak	2	2
20	(Austria) Yvonne Meusburger	6	6

Second round
(Slovenia) Petra Rampre	6	6
(China) Zhang Shuai	3	1
(Germany) Annika Beck	6	6
20	(Austria) Yvonne Meusburger	2	3

Qualifying competition
(Slovenia) Petra Rampre	3	4
(Germany) Annika Beck	6	6

=== Third qualifier ===
First round
3	(Spain) Garbiñe Muguruza	6	6
(Ukraine) Elina Svitolina	3	0
WC	(United Kingdom) Katy Dunne	1	1
(Italy) Maria Elena Camerin	6	6
(Argentina) Florencia Molinero	2	0
(Ukraine) Yuliya Beygelzimer	6	6
(Turkey) Çağla Büyükakçay	3	7^{7}	4
13	(France) Claire Feuerstein	6	6^{2}	6

Second round
3	(Spain) Garbiñe Muguruza	4	2
(Italy) Maria Elena Camerin	6	6
(Ukraine) Yuliya Beygelzimer	7	3	4
13	(France) Claire Feuerstein	5	6	6

Qualifying competition
(Italy) Maria Elena Camerin	6	1	7
13	(France) Claire Feuerstein	4	6	5

=== Fourth qualifier ===
First round
4	(Japan) Misaki Doi	6	7
(United States) Tetiana Luzhanska	3	5
(Poland) Marta Domachowska	1	3
(United States) Madison Keys	6	6
(France) Kristina Mladenovic	6	4	6
WC	(United Kingdom) Anna Fitzpatrick	3	6	2
(Hungary) Réka Luca Jani	3	5
21	(Germany) Dinah Pfizenmaier	6	7

Second round
4	(Japan) Misaki Doi	5	7	6
(United States) Madison Keys	7	5	3
(France) Kristina Mladenovic	6	6
21	(Germany) Dinah Pfizenmaier	3	4

Qualifying competition
4	(Japan) Misaki Doi	6	4	4
(France) Kristina Mladenovic	4	6	6

=== Fifth qualifier ===
First round
5	(Kazakhstan) Sesil Karatantcheva	6	6
(United States) Madison Brengle	3	4
WC	(United Kingdom) Lisa Whybourn	6	4	6
(Germany) Sarah Gronert	1	6	4
(Thailand) Noppawan Lertcheewakarn	1	1
(Poland) Sandra Zaniewska	6	6
(Romania) Mădălina Gojnea	2	4
23	(Romania) Mihaela Buzărnescu	6	6

Second round
5	(Kazakhstan) Sesil Karatantcheva	5	6	6
WC	(United Kingdom) Lisa Whybourn	7	4	0
(Poland) Sandra Zaniewska	6	6
23	(Romania) Mihaela Buzărnescu	3	1

Qualifying competition
5	(Kazakhstan) Sesil Karatantcheva	3	6	4
(Poland) Sandra Zaniewska	6	4	6

=== Sixth qualifier ===
First round
6	(Colombia) Mariana Duque Mariño	5	6	3
(Spain) Estrella Cabeza Candela	7	4	6
(United States) Jill Craybas	4	1
(Serbia) Vesna Dolonc	6	6
(Italy) Nastassja Burnett	6	6^{6}	5
(Spain) Inés Ferrer Suárez	3	7^{8}	7
(Switzerland) Amra Sadiković	2	2
15	(Russia) Valeria Savinykh	6	6

Second round
(Spain) Estrella Cabeza Candela	1	2
(Serbia) Vesna Dolonc	6	6
(Spain) Inés Ferrer Suárez	3	4
15	(Russia) Valeria Savinykh	6	6

Qualifying competition
(Serbia) Vesna Dolonc	6	6
15	(Russia) Valeria Savinykh	2	2

=== Seventh qualifier ===
First round
7	(Argentina) Paula Ormaechea	2	4
(Russia) Ekaterina Bychkova	6	6
(Ukraine) Olga Savchuk	6	6^{7}	6
(Russia) Vitalia Diatchenko	2	7^{9}	3
(South Africa) Chanel Simmonds	6	6
(Georgia (country)) Margalita Chakhnashvili	4	0
(Slovakia) Jana Čepelová	7^{7}	6
18	(Russia) Alla Kudryavtseva	6^{5}	3

Second round
(Russia) Ekaterina Bychkova	6	7
(Ukraine) Olga Savchuk	4	5
(South Africa) Chanel Simmonds	2	2
(Slovakia) Jana Čepelová	6	6

Qualifying competition
(Russia) Ekaterina Bychkova	2	3
(Slovakia) Jana Čepelová	6	6

=== Eighth qualifier ===
First round
8	(Switzerland) Stefanie Vögele	6	1	7
(United States) Grace Min	4	6	5
(Czech Republic) Kristýna Plíšková	6	6
(Russia) Olga Puchkova	3	4
(France) Iryna Brémond	0	1
(France) Irena Pavlovic	6	6
WC	(United Kingdom) Tara Moore	6	6^{5}	4
16	(Japan) Erika Sema	4	7^{7}	6

Second round
8	(Switzerland) Stefanie Vögele	6	4	3
(Czech Republic) Kristýna Plíšková	4	6	6
(France) Irena Pavlovic	6	6
16	(Japan) Erika Sema	0	4

Qualifying competition
(Czech Republic) Kristýna Plíšková	6	6
(France) Irena Pavlovic	3	2

=== Ninth qualifier ===
First round
9	(Czech Republic) Karolína Plíšková	6	6
(Chinese Taipei) Chan Yung-jan	3	3
(Croatia) Ajla Tomljanović	5	1^{r}
(Portugal) Michelle Larcher de Brito	7	3
(France) Caroline Garcia	2	4
(United States) Alison Riske	6	6
(Japan) Yurika Sema	6	6
19	(United States) Julia Cohen	0	3

Second round
9	(Czech Republic) Karolína Plíšková	6	3	6
(Portugal) Michelle Larcher de Brito	4	6	3
(United States) Alison Riske	6^{3}	5
(Japan) Yurika Sema	7^{7}	7

Qualifying competition
9	(Czech Republic) Karolína Plíšková	6	6
(Japan) Yurika Sema	4	1

=== Tenth qualifier ===
First round
10	(Australia) Olivia Rogowska	6	6
(Canada) Sharon Fichman	2	2
WC	(United Kingdom) Emily Webley-Smith	3	3
(Italy) Camila Giorgi	6	6
(United States) Alexa Glatch	6	6
(Italy) Anna Floris	1	0
(Paraguay) Verónica Cepede Royg	2	3
17	(France) Aravane Rezaï	6	6

Second round
10	(Australia) Olivia Rogowska	1	4
(Italy) Camila Giorgi	6	6
(United States) Alexa Glatch	7^{7}	6
17	(France) Aravane Rezaï	6^{5}	2

Qualifying competition
(Italy) Camila Giorgi	7^{7}	6
(United States) Alexa Glatch	6^{5}	2

=== Eleventh qualifier ===
First round
11	(Spain) Lara Arruabarrena	6	6
WC	(United Kingdom) Melanie South	3	2
(United States) Gail Brodsky	3	4
(Germany) Tatjana Malek	6	6
(Germany) Kathrin Wörle	4	7	6
(Germany) Kristina Barrois	6	5	4
(Belgium) Tamaryn Hendler	1	2
14	(United States) CoCo Vandeweghe	6	6

Second round
11	(Spain) Lara Arruabarrena	6	6
(Germany) Tatjana Malek	3	3
(Germany) Kathrin Wörle	4	4
14	(United States) CoCo Vandeweghe	6	6

Qualifying competition
11	(Spain) Lara Arruabarrena	2	7^{7}	5
14	(United States) CoCo Vandeweghe	6	6^{2}	7

=== Twelfth qualifier ===
First round
12	(Croatia) Mirjana Lučić	6	6
(Romania) Elena Bogdan	1	1
(Argentina) Gisela Dulko	7	4	6
WC	(United Kingdom) Samantha Murray	5	6	3
(Brazil) Teliana Pereira	2	7^{7}	4
(China) Zheng Saisai	6	6^{5}	6
(Bulgaria) Dia Evtimova	2	2
24	(Netherlands) Bibiane Schoofs	6	6

Second round
12	(Croatia) Mirjana Lučić	6	6
(Argentina) Gisela Dulko	4	2
(China) Zheng Saisai	3	3
24	(Netherlands) Bibiane Schoofs	6	6

Qualifying competition
12	(Croatia) Mirjana Lučić	7	6
24	(Netherlands) Bibiane Schoofs	5	4
