= 2012 Wimbledon Championships – Men's singles qualifying =

Men's singles qualifying
- 2012 Wimbledon Championships

Events
Singles	men	women		boys	girls
Doubles	men	women	mixed	boys	girls
WC Singles	men	women	quad
WC Doubles	men	women	quad
Legends	men	women	seniors

Qualification
Singles	men	women
Doubles	men	women
- Wimbledon Championships

Players and pairs who neither have high enough rankings nor receive wild cards may participate in a qualifying tournament held one week before the annual Wimbledon Tennis Championships.

== Seeds ==
1. (Estonia) Jürgen Zopp (qualified)
2. (Germany) Daniel Brands (first round)
3. (Portugal) Frederico Gil (first round)
4. (United States) Michael Russell (qualified)
5. (United States) Jesse Levine (qualified)
6. (Brazil) Rogério Dutra Silva (first round)
7. (Germany) Michael Berrer (first round)
8. (United States) Rajeev Ram (qualifying competition)
9. (Italy) Simone Bolelli (qualified)
10. (Spain) Roberto Bautista Agut (qualifying competition)
11. (United States) Brian Baker (qualified)
12. (Spain) Daniel Gimeno Traver (first round)
13. (Italy) Alessandro Giannessi (second round)
14. (United States) Bobby Reynolds (first round)
15. (Spain) Daniel Muñoz de la Nava (first round)
16. (Slovenia) Aljaž Bedene (first round)
17. (Switzerland) Marco Chiudinelli (second round)
18. (Belgium) Ruben Bemelmans (qualified)
19. (Russia) Teymuraz Gabashvili (second round)
20. (United States) Wayne Odesnik (qualifying competition, lucky loser)
21. (United States) Ryan Sweeting (qualified)
22. (France) Florent Serra (qualified)
23. (France) Arnaud Clément (first round)
24. (Poland) Jerzy Janowicz (qualified)
25. (Turkey) Marsel İlhan (second round)
26. (South Africa) Rik de Voest (first round)
27. (Brazil) Thiago Alves (second round)
28. (Portugal) João Sousa (second round)
29. (France) Augustin Gensse (first round)
30. (Croatia) Antonio Veić (first round)
31. (Spain) Íñigo Cervantes (qualified)
32. (Russia) Andrey Kuznetsov (qualified)

== Qualifiers ==
1. (Estonia) Jürgen Zopp
2. (Spain) Adrián Menéndez Maceiras
3. (France) Guillaume Rufin
4. (United States) Michael Russell
5. (United States) Jesse Levine
6. (France) Florent Serra
7. (United States) Ryan Sweeting
8. (Germany) Dustin Brown
9. (Italy) Simone Bolelli
10. (Chinese Taipei) Jimmy Wang
11. (United States) Brian Baker
12. (France) Kenny de Schepper
13. (Belgium) Ruben Bemelmans
14. (Spain) Íñigo Cervantes
15. (Poland) Jerzy Janowicz
16. (Russia) Andrey Kuznetsov

== Lucky losers ==
1. (United States) Wayne Odesnik

== Qualifying draw ==
=== First qualifier ===
First round
1	(Estonia) Jürgen Zopp	6	6
(Spain) Guillermo Olaso	4	4
(Australia) Benjamin Mitchell	6^{4}	6	3
WC	(United Kingdom) Chris Eaton	7^{7}	4	6
(Czech Republic) Dušan Lojda	6^{4}	1
(Bosnia and Herzegovina) Damir Džumhur	7^{7}	6
(South Africa) Izak van der Merwe	6	7^{7}
29	(France) Augustin Gensse	3	6^{5}

Second round
1	(Estonia) Jürgen Zopp	7^{9}	7^{8}
WC	(United Kingdom) Chris Eaton	6^{7}	6^{6}
(Bosnia and Herzegovina) Damir Džumhur	3	3
(South Africa) Izak van der Merwe	6	6

Qualifying competition
1	(Estonia) Jürgen Zopp	6	6	4	7
(South Africa) Izak van der Merwe	4	1	6	5

=== Second qualifier ===
First round
2	(Germany) Daniel Brands	4	4
(Spain) Iván Navarro	6	6
(United States) Michael Yani	3	6	6
(Austria) Philipp Oswald	6	2	4
(Spain) Adrián Menéndez Maceiras	4	7^{12}	10
(Czech Republic) Jan Hernych	6	6^{10}	8
(Italy) Stefano Galvani	4	3
28	(Portugal) João Sousa	6	6

Second round
(Spain) Iván Navarro	6	6
(United States) Michael Yani	3	3
(Spain) Adrián Menéndez Maceiras	6	7^{8}
28	(Portugal) João Sousa	2	6^{6}

Qualifying competition
(Spain) Iván Navarro	5	3	6	4
(Spain) Adrián Menéndez Maceiras	7	6	3	6

=== Third qualifier ===
First round
3	(Portugal) Frederico Gil	5	6	3
(France) Jonathan Dasnières de Veigy	7	4	6
WC	(United Kingdom) Liam Broady	6^{5}	4
(Italy) Thomas Fabbiano	7^{7}	6
(Israel) Amir Weintraub	4	7	3
(France) Guillaume Rufin	6	5	6
(Thailand) Danai Udomchoke	6	3	4
25	(Turkey) Marsel İlhan	3	6	6

Second round
(France) Jonathan Dasnières de Veigy	6	7^{7}
(Italy) Thomas Fabbiano	3	6^{5}
(France) Guillaume Rufin	6	6
25	(Turkey) Marsel İlhan	4	4

Qualifying competition
(France) Jonathan Dasnières de Veigy	4	7^{7}	7^{7}	3	4
(France) Guillaume Rufin	6	6^{4}	6^{5}	6	6

=== Fourth qualifier ===
First round
4	(United States) Michael Russell	6	6
(Switzerland) Michael Lammer	1	1
(Portugal) Pedro Sousa	4	6^{4}
(Austria) Andreas Haider-Maurer	6	7^{7}
(Italy) Gianluca Naso	0	7^{7}	4
(Japan) Yūichi Sugita	6	6^{5}	6
(Chinese Taipei) Yang Tsung-hua	6^{6}	7^{7}	4
27	(Brazil) Thiago Alves	7^{8}	6^{4}	6

Second round
4	(United States) Michael Russell	6	6
(Austria) Andreas Haider-Maurer	3	4
(Japan) Yūichi Sugita	6	6
27	(Brazil) Thiago Alves	2	1

Qualifying competition
4	(United States) Michael Russell	6	4	6	4	6
(Japan) Yūichi Sugita	3	6	3	6	2

=== Fifth qualifier ===
First round
5	(United States) Jesse Levine	6	2	10
(France) Adrian Mannarino	3	6	8
(Japan) Hiroki Moriya	6	6
WC	(United Kingdom) Richard Bloomfield	4	4
(Canada) Peter Polansky	6	6
(Argentina) Pablo Galdón	4	1
PR	(Serbia) Filip Krajinović	6	4	2
20	(United States) Wayne Odesnik	3	6	6

Second round
5	(United States) Jesse Levine	7	6^{2}	6
(Japan) Hiroki Moriya	5	7^{7}	0
(Canada) Peter Polansky	6^{5}	3
20	(United States) Wayne Odesnik	7^{7}	6

Qualifying competition
5	(United States) Jesse Levine	7^{7}	6	6
20	(United States) Wayne Odesnik	6^{3}	1	2

=== Sixth qualifier ===
First round
6	(Brazil) Rogério Dutra Silva	6^{5}	4
(United States) Tim Smyczek	7^{7}	6
(Italy) Matteo Viola	3	7^{7}	6
(Russia) Alexander Kudryavtsev	6	6^{3}	2
(France) Romain Jouan	6	2	6
(Germany) Mischa Zverev	4	6	3
(Argentina) Agustín Velotti	1	1
22	(France) Florent Serra	6	6

Second round
(United States) Tim Smyczek	6	3	6
(Italy) Matteo Viola	3	6	8
(France) Romain Jouan	5	6	3
22	(France) Florent Serra	7	3	6

Qualifying competition
(Italy) Matteo Viola	6	4	6^{5}	7^{10}	4
22	(France) Florent Serra	4	6	7^{7}	6^{8}	6

=== Seventh qualifier ===
First round
7	(Germany) Michael Berrer	6^{6}	6	1
(Germany) Peter Torebko	7^{8}	4	6
(Spain) Javier Martí	6^{4}	4
(Colombia) Robert Farah	7^{7}	6
(France) Stéphane Robert	6	6
WC	(United Kingdom) Edward Corrie	4	3
(United States) Alex Kuznetsov	6	5	3
21	(United States) Ryan Sweeting	4	7	6

Second round
(Germany) Peter Torebko	6^{4}	6	6
(Colombia) Robert Farah	7^{7}	4	4
(France) Stéphane Robert	4	2
21	(United States) Ryan Sweeting	6	6

Qualifying competition
(Germany) Peter Torebko	6	6	6^{3}	5	4
21	(United States) Ryan Sweeting	3	1	7^{7}	7	6

=== Eighth qualifier ===
First round
8	(United States) Rajeev Ram	6	6
(Argentina) Máximo González	2	3
(Argentina) Martín Alund	6^{3}	6^{5}
(Colombia) Carlos Salamanca	7^{7}	7^{7}
(Germany) Dustin Brown	6	2
(Netherlands) Thomas Schoorel	3	2^{r}
WC	(United Kingdom) Andrew Fitzpatrick	3	4
17	(Switzerland) Marco Chiudinelli	6	6

Second round
8	(United States) Rajeev Ram	7^{8}	6
(Colombia) Carlos Salamanca	6^{6}	4
(Germany) Dustin Brown	6	6
17	(Switzerland) Marco Chiudinelli	4	0

Qualifying competition
8	(United States) Rajeev Ram	6	3	4	4
(Germany) Dustin Brown	4	6	6	6

=== Ninth qualifier ===
First round
9	(Italy) Simone Bolelli	7^{9}	6
(France) Grégoire Burquier	6^{7}	4
(Austria) Martin Fischer	6^{6}	6	6
(Germany) Stefan Seifert	7^{8}	3	2
(Germany) Simon Greul	7^{8}	6
(Portugal) Gastão Elias	6^{6}	2
(Belgium) Maxime Authom	6	1	6
26	(South Africa) Rik de Voest	3	6	3

Second round
9	(Italy) Simone Bolelli	6	6
(Austria) Martin Fischer	3	4
(Germany) Simon Greul	2	2
(Belgium) Maxime Authom	6	6

Qualifying competition
9	(Italy) Simone Bolelli	7	6	6
(Belgium) Maxime Authom	5	3	4

=== Tenth qualifier ===
First round
10	(Spain) Roberto Bautista Agut	6	6
WC	(United Kingdom) Luke Bambridge	1	2
(United States) Robby Ginepri	6	2	4
(Ukraine) Sergei Bubka	4	6	6
(Chinese Taipei) Jimmy Wang	6	6
(Serbia) Dušan Lajović	4	1
(Belgium) Yannick Mertens	7^{7}	6^{3}	3
19	(Russia) Teymuraz Gabashvili	6^{5}	7^{7}	6

Second round
10	(Spain) Roberto Bautista Agut	6	7^{7}
(Ukraine) Sergei Bubka	3	6^{4}
(Chinese Taipei) Jimmy Wang	6^{5}	6	6
19	(Russia) Teymuraz Gabashvili	7^{7}	1	4

Qualifying competition
10	(Spain) Roberto Bautista Agut	0	6^{5}	5
(Chinese Taipei) Jimmy Wang	6	7^{7}	7

=== Eleventh qualifier ===
First round
11	(United States) Brian Baker	6	6
(Moldova) Radu Albot	2	3
(Germany) Denis Gremelmayr	7	6
(France) Vincent Millot	5	3
(France) Maxime Teixeira	6	6
(Czech Republic) Jan Mertl	3	4
(Lithuania) Laurynas Grigelis	6	6
30	(Croatia) Antonio Veić	2	3

Second round
11	(United States) Brian Baker	6	6
(Germany) Denis Gremelmayr	2	4
(France) Maxime Teixeira	7^{8}	6
(Lithuania) Laurynas Grigelis	6^{6}	4

Qualifying competition
11	(United States) Brian Baker	5	6	6	6
(France) Maxime Teixeira	7	2	1	2

=== Twelfth qualifier ===
First round
12	(Spain) Daniel Gimeno Traver	3	7^{7}	4
WC	(United Kingdom) Kyle Edmund	6	6^{4}	6
(Romania) Victor Crivoi	0	1
(Uruguay) Marcel Felder	6	6
(France) Mathieu Rodrigues	4	5
(Czech Republic) Ivo Minář	6	7
(France) Kenny de Schepper	6^{8}	7^{7}	6
23	(France) Arnaud Clément	7^{10}	6^{5}	3

Second round
WC	(United Kingdom) Kyle Edmund	6	6^{2}	2
(Uruguay) Marcel Felder	0	7^{7}	6
(Czech Republic) Ivo Minář	3	6	8
(France) Kenny de Schepper	6	3	10

Qualifying competition
(Uruguay) Marcel Felder	3	2	3
(France) Kenny de Schepper	6	6	6

=== Thirteenth qualifier ===
First round
13	(Italy) Alessandro Giannessi	6	6
(Russia) Evgeny Kirillov	3	4
(Uzbekistan) Farrukh Dustov	4	6	7
(France) Josselin Ouanna	6	4	5
(Spain) Arnau Brugués Davi	7^{7}	6
(Moldova) Roman Borvanov	6^{2}	3
(Russia) Evgeny Donskoy	2	5
18	(Belgium) Ruben Bemelmans	6	7

Second round
13	(Italy) Alessandro Giannessi	6^{6}	6^{8}
(Uzbekistan) Farrukh Dustov	7^{8}	7^{10}
(Spain) Arnau Brugués Davi	6^{1}	2
18	(Belgium) Ruben Bemelmans	7^{7}	6

Qualifying competition
(Uzbekistan) Farrukh Dustov	3	7^{7}	5	1
18	(Belgium) Ruben Bemelmans	6	6^{3}	7	6

=== Fourteenth qualifier ===
First round
14	(United States) Bobby Reynolds	3	7	9
(Canada) Érik Chvojka	6	5	11
(Finland) Harri Heliövaara	2	6	6
(Brazil) Júlio Silva	6	2	4
(Serbia) Nikola Ćirić	6^{2}	7	9
(Argentina) Marco Trungelliti	7^{7}	5	11
WC	(United Kingdom) George Morgan	0	4
31	(Spain) Íñigo Cervantes	6	6

Second round
(Canada) Érik Chvojka	7	7
(Finland) Harri Heliövaara	5	5
(Argentina) Marco Trungelliti	6^{6}	6	8
31	(Spain) Íñigo Cervantes	7^{8}	3	10

Qualifying competition
(Canada) Érik Chvojka	7^{7}	6	2	6^{3}	2
31	(Spain) Íñigo Cervantes	6^{4}	4	6	7^{7}	6

=== Fifteenth qualifier ===
First round
15	(Spain) Daniel Muñoz de la Nava	6	3	2
(United States) Denis Kudla	4	6	6
(Italy) Simone Vagnozzi	4	6	6
(Slovakia) Pavol Červenák	6	3	4
(Slovakia) Kamil Čapkovič	6	7^{7}
PR	(Croatia) Franko Škugor	4	6^{5}
(Germany) Peter Gojowczyk	5	0^{r}
24	(Poland) Jerzy Janowicz	7	0

Second round
(United States) Denis Kudla	6	6
(Italy) Simone Vagnozzi	2	4
(Slovakia) Kamil Čapkovič	1	2
24	(Poland) Jerzy Janowicz	6	6

Qualifying competition
(United States) Denis Kudla	1	0	2
24	(Poland) Jerzy Janowicz	6	6	6

=== Sixteenth qualifier ===
First round
16	(Slovenia) Aljaž Bedene	3	6^{0}
(Australia) James Duckworth	6	7^{7}
(India) Yuki Bhambri	4	0
(France) Marc Gicquel	6	6
(China) Zhang Ze	6	4	6
WC	(United Kingdom) David Rice	3	6	2
(Lithuania) Ričardas Berankis	4	5
32	(Russia) Andrey Kuznetsov	6	7

Second round
(Australia) James Duckworth	3	7^{9}	4
(France) Marc Gicquel	6	6^{7}	6
(China) Zhang Ze	4	6^{3}
32	(Russia) Andrey Kuznetsov	6	7^{7}

Qualifying competition
(France) Marc Gicquel	6	0	3	2
32	(Russia) Andrey Kuznetsov	4	6	6	6
