= 2012 Wimbledon Championships – Men's doubles qualifying =

Men's doubles qualifying
- 2012 Wimbledon Championships

Events
Singles	men	women		boys	girls
Doubles	men	women	mixed	boys	girls
WC Singles	men	women	quad
WC Doubles	men	women	quad
Legends	men	women	seniors

Qualification
Singles	men	women
Doubles	men	women
- Wimbledon Championships

Players and pairs who neither have high enough rankings nor receive wild cards may participate in a qualifying tournament held one week before the annual Wimbledon Tennis Championships.

== Seeds ==
1. (United States) John Paul Fruttero / (South Africa) Raven Klaasen (first round)
2. (Thailand) Sanchai Ratiwatana / (Thailand) Sonchat Ratiwatana (qualifying competition, withdrew, lucky losers)
3. (United States) Bobby Reynolds / (South Africa) Izak van der Merwe (qualified)
4. (Chinese Taipei) Hsieh Cheng-peng / (Chinese Taipei) Lee Hsin-han (first round)
5. (Germany) Andre Begemann / (Slovakia) Igor Zelenay (qualified)
6. (Australia) Colin Ebelthite / (Australia) John Peers (qualifying competition, lucky losers)
7. (United States) Nicholas Monroe / (Germany) Simon Stadler (first round)
8. (Spain) Adrián Menéndez Maceiras / (Austria) Philipp Oswald (qualifying competition)

== Qualifiers ==
1. (Germany) Andre Begemann / (Slovakia) Igor Zelenay
2. (Germany) Matthias Bachinger / (Germany) Tobias Kamke
3. (United States) Bobby Reynolds / (South Africa) Izak van der Merwe
4. (United Kingdom) Lewis Burton / (United Kingdom) George Morgan

== Lucky losers ==
1. (Thailand) Sanchai Ratiwatana / (Thailand) Sonchat Ratiwatana
2. (Australia) Colin Ebelthite / (Australia) John Peers

== Qualifying draw ==
=== First qualifier ===
First round
1	(United States) John Paul Fruttero (South Africa) Raven Klaasen	7^{7}	4	3
(South Africa) Rik de Voest (Canada) Adil Shamasdin	6^{2}	6	6
(Poland) Jerzy Janowicz (Estonia) Jürgen Zopp	6	4	2
5	(Germany) Andre Begemann (Slovakia) Igor Zelenay	4	6	6

Qualifying competition
(South Africa) Rik de Voest (Canada) Adil Shamasdin	4	2
5	(Germany) Andre Begemann (Slovakia) Igor Zelenay	6	6

=== Second qualifier ===
First round
2	(Thailand) Sanchai Ratiwatana (Thailand) Sonchat Ratiwatana	7^{7}	7^{7}
(France) Olivier Charroin (Australia) Rameez Junaid	6^{3}	6^{4}
(Germany) Matthias Bachinger (Germany) Tobias Kamke	7^{8}	6
7	(United States) Nicholas Monroe (Germany) Simon Stadler	6^{6}	3

Qualifying competition
2	(Thailand) Sanchai Ratiwatana (Thailand) Sonchat Ratiwatana	w/o
(Germany) Matthias Bachinger (Germany) Tobias Kamke

=== Third qualifier ===
First round
3	(United States) Bobby Reynolds (South Africa) Izak van der Merwe	6	6
(Slovakia) Karol Beck (Croatia) Lovro Zovko	3	4
(Belgium) Ruben Bemelmans (Germany) Daniel Brands	6	6^{5}	14
6	(Australia) Colin Ebelthite (Australia) John Peers	3	7^{7}	16

Qualifying competition
3	(United States) Bobby Reynolds (South Africa) Izak van der Merwe	7^{7}	3	11
6	(Australia) Colin Ebelthite (Australia) John Peers	6^{2}	6	9

=== Fourth qualifier ===
First round
4	(Chinese Taipei) Hsieh Cheng-peng (Chinese Taipei) Lee Hsin-han	7^{11}	1	11
WC	(United Kingdom) Lewis Burton (United Kingdom) George Morgan	6^{9}	6	13
WC	(United Kingdom) David Rice (United Kingdom) Sean Thornley	6^{2}	7^{8}	3
8	(Spain) Adrián Menéndez Maceiras (Austria) Philipp Oswald	7^{7}	6^{6}	6

Qualifying competition
WC	(United Kingdom) Lewis Burton (United Kingdom) George Morgan	7^{7}	4	7
8	(Spain) Adrián Menéndez Maceiras (Austria) Philipp Oswald	6^{1}	6	5
