= 2012 Wimbledon Championships – Women's doubles qualifying =

Tennis tournament

Women's doubles qualifying
- 2012 Wimbledon Championships

Events
Singles	men	women		boys	girls
Doubles	men	women	mixed	boys	girls
WC Singles	men	women	quad
WC Doubles	men	women	quad
Legends	men	women	seniors

Qualification
Singles	men	women
Doubles	men	women
- Wimbledon Championships

Players and pairs who neither have high enough rankings nor receive wild cards may participate in a qualifying tournament held one week before the annual Wimbledon Tennis Championships.

== Seeds ==
1. (Croatia) Darija Jurak / (Hungary) Katalin Marosi (qualified)
2. (Czech Republic) Karolína Plíšková / (Czech Republic) Kristýna Plíšková (qualifying competition)
3. (United States) Lindsay Lee-Waters / (United States) Megan Moulton-Levy (qualified)
4. (Serbia) Vesna Dolonc / (Ukraine) Olga Savchuk (qualified)
5. (Japan) Shuko Aoyama / (Russia) Maria Kondratieva (qualifying competition)
6. (Austria) Sandra Klemenschits / (Germany) Tatjana Malek (first round)
7. (Colombia) Mariana Duque Mariño / (Romania) Edina Gallovits-Hall (first round)
8. (Spain) Lara Arruabarrena / (Italy) Karin Knapp (first round)

== Qualifiers ==
1. (Croatia) Darija Jurak / (Hungary) Katalin Marosi
2. (Croatia) Mirjana Lučić / (Russia) Valeria Savinykh
3. (United States) Lindsay Lee-Waters / (United States) Megan Moulton-Levy
4. (Serbia) Vesna Dolonc / (Ukraine) Olga Savchuk

== Qualifying draw ==
=== First qualifier ===
First round
1	(Croatia) Darija Jurak (Hungary) Katalin Marosi	6	7^{7}
(Japan) Erika Sema (Belarus) Anastasiya Yakimova	4	6^{3}
(Canada) Sharon Fichman (Kazakhstan) Sesil Karatantcheva	6	7^{7}
7	(Colombia) Mariana Duque Mariño (Romania) Edina Gallovits-Hall	1	6^{5}

Qualifying competition
1	(Croatia) Darija Jurak (Hungary) Katalin Marosi	6	6
(Canada) Sharon Fichman (Kazakhstan) Sesil Karatantcheva	1	4

=== Second qualifier ===
First round
2	(Czech Republic) Karolína Plíšková (Czech Republic) Kristýna Plíšková	6	6
(France) Mathilde Johansson (France) Sophie Lefèvre	1	2
(Croatia) Mirjana Lučić (Russia) Valeria Savinykh	6	6
8	(Spain) Lara Arruabarrena (Italy) Karin Knapp	3	2

Qualifying competition
2	(Czech Republic) Karolína Plíšková (Czech Republic) Kristýna Plíšková	3	5
(Croatia) Mirjana Lučić (Russia) Valeria Savinykh	6	7

=== Third qualifier ===
First round
3	(United States) Lindsay Lee-Waters (United States) Megan Moulton-Levy	6	6
WC	(United Kingdom) Anna Fitzpatrick (United Kingdom) Jade Windley	1	1
(Japan) Misaki Doi (Australia) Olivia Rogowska	6	6
6	(Austria) Sandra Klemenschits (Germany) Tatjana Malek	3	4

Qualifying competition
3	(United States) Lindsay Lee-Waters (United States) Megan Moulton-Levy	6	4	6
(Japan) Misaki Doi (Australia) Olivia Rogowska	4	6	4

=== Fourth qualifier ===
First round
4	(Serbia) Vesna Dolonc (Ukraine) Olga Savchuk	6	6
WC	(United Kingdom) Samantha Murray (United Kingdom) Emily Webley-Smith	2	1
(Chinese Taipei) Chang Kai-chen (Argentina) Paula Ormaechea	3	3
5	(Japan) Shuko Aoyama (Russia) Maria Kondratieva	6	6

Qualifying competition
4	(Serbia) Vesna Dolonc (Ukraine) Olga Savchuk	6	6
5	(Japan) Shuko Aoyama (Russia) Maria Kondratieva	1	2
