= 2012 Wimbledon Championships – Day-by-day summaries =

The 2012 Wimbledon Championships are described below in detail, in the form of day-by-day summaries.

== Day-by-day summaries ==
=== Day 1 (25 June) ===
- Seeds out:
  - Gentlemen's singles: (Czech Republic) Tomáš Berdych [6], (United States) John Isner [11], (Italy) Andreas Seppi [23], (Spain) Marcel Granollers [24]
  - Ladies' singles: (Italy) Flavia Pennetta [16], (Serbia) Jelena Janković [18], (Slovakia) Daniela Hantuchová [27], (Romania) Monica Niculescu [29]
  - Ladies' doubles: (Spain) Anabel Medina Garrigues / (Spain) Arantxa Parra Santonja [12]
- Schedule of Play

Matches on main courts
Matches on Centre Court
Event	Winner	Loser	Score
Gentlemen's singles 1st round	(Serbia) Novak Djokovic [1]	(Spain) Juan Carlos Ferrero	6–3, 6–3, 6–1
Ladies' singles 1st round	(Russia) Maria Sharapova [1]	(Australia) Anastasia Rodionova	6–2, 6–3
Gentlemen's singles 1st round	(Latvia) Ernests Gulbis	(Czech Republic) Tomáš Berdych [6]	7–6^{(7–5)}, 7–6^{(7–4)}, 7–6^{(7–4)}
Ladies' singles 1st round	(United Kingdom) Heather Watson	(Czech Republic) Iveta Benešová	6–2, 6–1
Matches on No. 1 Court
Event	Winner	Loser	Score
Gentlemen's singles 1st round	(Serbia) Janko Tipsarević [8]	(Argentina) David Nalbandian	6–4, 7–6^{(7–4)}, 6–2
Gentlemen's singles 1st round	(Switzerland) Roger Federer [3]	(Spain) Albert Ramos Viñolas	6–1, 6–1, 6–1
Ladies' singles 1st round	(Belgium) Kim Clijsters	(Serbia) Jelena Janković [18]	6–2, 6–4
Ladies' singles 1st round	(Russia) Vera Zvonareva [12] vs. (Germany) Mona Barthel		2–6, 7–6^{(7–3)}, suspended
Matches on No. 2 Court
Event	Winner	Loser	Score
Ladies' singles 1st round	(Poland) Agnieszka Radwańska [3]	(Slovakia) Magdaléna Rybáriková	6–3, 6–3
Ladies' singles 1st round	(Russia) Elena Vesnina	(United States) Venus Williams	6–1, 6–3
Gentlemen's singles 1st round	(Czech Republic) Radek Štěpánek [28]	(Ukraine) Sergiy Stakhovsky	6–1, 0–1 ret.
Gentlemen's singles 1st round	(Russia) Igor Andreev	(United Kingdom) Oliver Golding [WC]	1–6, 7–6^{(7–4)}, 7–6^{(9–7)}, 7–5
Matches on No. 3 Court
Event	Winner	Loser	Score
Ladies' singles 1st round	(Australia) Samantha Stosur [5]	(Spain) Carla Suárez Navarro	6–1, 6–3
Gentlemen's singles 1st round	(Slovenia) Grega Žemlja [WC]	(United Kingdom) Josh Goodall [WC]	6–4, 3–6, 7–6^{(7–3)}, 6–4
Gentlemen's singles 1st round	(Colombia) Alejandro Falla	(United States) John Isner [11]	6–4, 6–7^{(7–9)}, 3–6, 7–6^{(9–7)}, 7–5
Ladies' singles 1st round	(United States) Jamie Hampton	(Slovakia) Daniela Hantuchová [27]	6–4, 7–6^{(7–1)}

=== Day 2 (26 June) ===
- Seeds out:
  - Gentlemen's singles: (Spain) Feliciano López [14], (Australia) Bernard Tomic [20], (South Africa) Kevin Anderson [32]
  - Ladies' singles: (Czech Republic) Lucie Šafářová [19], (Russia) Svetlana Kuznetsova [32]
- Schedule of Play

Matches on main courts
Matches on Centre Court
Event	Winner	Loser	Score
Ladies' singles 1st round	(Czech Republic) Petra Kvitová [4]	(Uzbekistan) Akgul Amanmuradova	6–4, 6–4
Gentlemen's singles 1st round	(Spain) Rafael Nadal [2]	(Brazil) Thomaz Bellucci	7–6^{(7–0)}, 6–2, 6–3
Gentlemen's singles 1st round	(United Kingdom) Andy Murray [4]	(Russia) Nikolay Davydenko	6–1, 6–1, 6–4
Ladies’ singles 1st round	(Denmark) Caroline Wozniacki [7] vs. (Austria) Tamira Paszek		2–2, suspended
Matches on No. 1 Court
Event	Winner	Loser	Score
Ladies' singles 1st round	(Russia) Vera Zvonareva [12]	(Germany) Mona Barthel	2–6, 7–6^{(7–3)}, 6–4
Gentlemen's singles 1st round	(France) Jo-Wilfried Tsonga [5]	(Australia) Lleyton Hewitt [WC]	6–3, 6–4, 6–4
Ladies' singles 1st round	(Belarus) Victoria Azarenka [2]	(United States) Irina Falconi	6–1, 6–4
Gentlemen's singles 1st round	(United Kingdom) Jamie Baker [WC] vs. (United States) Andy Roddick [30]		6–7^{(1–7)}, 2–4, suspended
Matches on No. 2 Court
Event	Winner	Loser	Score
Gentlemen's singles 1st round	(Belgium) David Goffin [WC]	(Australia) Bernard Tomic [20]	3–6, 6–3, 6–4, 6–4
Ladies' singles 1st round	(United States) Serena Williams [6]	(Czech Republic) Barbora Záhlavová-Strýcová	6–2, 6–4
Gentlemen's singles 1st round	(Argentina) Juan Martín del Potro [9]	(Netherlands) Robin Haase	6–4, 3–6, 7–6^{(7–3)}, 7–5
Matches on No. 3 Court
Event	Winner	Loser	Score
Ladies' singles 1st round	(Italy) Francesca Schiavone [24]	(United Kingdom) Laura Robson [WC]	2–6, 6–4, 6–4
Gentlemen's singles 1st round	(Bulgaria) Grigor Dimitrov	(South Africa) Kevin Anderson [32]	7–5, 7–6^{(7–3)}, 6–7^{(4–7)}, 6–3
Ladies' singles 1st round	(United Kingdom) Anne Keothavong	(Spain) Laura Pous Tió	6–3, 6–3

=== Day 3 (27 June) ===
- Seeds out:
  - Gentlemen's singles: (Switzerland) Stan Wawrinka [25]
  - Ladies' singles: (Australia) Samantha Stosur [5], (Denmark) Caroline Wozniacki [7], (China) Li Na [11], (Slovakia) Dominika Cibulková [13], (Czech Republic) Petra Cetkovská [23]
  - Gentlemen's doubles: (Poland) Mariusz Fyrstenberg / (Poland) Marcin Matkowski [3], (United Kingdom) Colin Fleming / (United Kingdom) Ross Hutchins [13]
- Schedule of Play

Matches on main courts
Matches on Centre Court
Event	Winner	Loser	Score
Gentlemen's singles 2nd round	(Switzerland) Roger Federer [3]	(Italy) Fabio Fognini	6–1, 6–3, 6–2
Ladies' singles 1st round	(Austria) Tamira Paszek	(Denmark) Caroline Wozniacki [7]	5–7, 7–6^{(7–4)}, 6–4
Ladies' singles 2nd round	(Belgium) Kim Clijsters	(Czech Republic) Andrea Hlaváčková	6–3, 6–3
Gentlemen's singles 2nd round	(Serbia) Novak Djokovic [1]	(United States) Ryan Harrison	6–4, 6–4, 6–4
Matches on No. 1 Court
Event	Winner	Loser	Score
Ladies' singles 2nd round	(Netherlands) Arantxa Rus	(Australia) Samantha Stosur [5]	6–2, 0–6, 6–4
Gentlemen's singles 1st round	(United States) Andy Roddick [30]	(United Kingdom) Jamie Baker [WC]	7–6^{(7–1)}, 6–4, 7–5
Ladies' singles 2nd round	(Russia) Maria Sharapova [1] vs. (Bulgaria) Tsvetana Pironkova		7–6^{(7–3)}, 3–1, suspended
Matches on No. 2 Court
Event	Winner	Loser	Score
Ladies' singles 2nd round	(United Kingdom) Heather Watson	(United States) Jamie Hampton	6–1, 6–4
Gentlemen's singles 2nd round	(Serbia) Janko Tipsarević [8]	(United States) Ryan Sweeting [Q]	5–7, 7–5, 6–4, 6–2
Gentlemen's singles 2nd round	(France) Richard Gasquet [18]	(Belgium) Ruben Bemelmans [Q]	6–3, 6–4, 6–4
Matches on No. 3 Court
Event	Winner	Loser	Score
Gentlemen's singles 2nd round	(Argentina) Juan Mónaco [15]	(France) Jérémy Chardy	6–2, 3–6, 6–3, 7–6^{(7–3)}
Ladies' singles 2nd round	(Poland) Agnieszka Radwańska [3]	(Russia) Elena Vesnina	6–2, 6–1
Gentlemen's singles 2nd round	(Spain) Nicolás Almagro [12]	(France) Guillaume Rufin [Q]	6–2, 5–7, 6–2, 6–4

=== Day 4 (28 June) ===
- Seeds out:
  - Gentlemen's singles: (Spain) Rafael Nadal [2], (France) Gilles Simon [13], (Ukraine) Alexandr Dolgopolov [22]
  - Ladies' singles: (France) Marion Bartoli [9], (Russia) Anastasia Pavlyuchenkova [31]
  - Gentlemen's doubles: (Austria) Alexander Peya / (Serbia) Nenad Zimonjić [6], (Spain) Marcel Granollers / (Spain) Marc López [9], (Czech Republic) František Čermák / (Slovakia) Filip Polášek [11]
  - Ladies' doubles: (Argentina) Gisela Dulko / (Argentina) Paola Suárez [14], (Chinese Taipei) Chuang Chia-jung / (Russia) Vera Dushevina [16]
- Schedule of Play

Matches on main courts
Matches on Centre Court
Event	Winner	Loser	Score
Ladies' singles 2nd round	(United States) Serena Williams [6]	(Hungary) Melinda Czink [Q]	6–1, 6–4
Gentlemen's singles 2nd round	(United Kingdom) Andy Murray [4]	(Croatia) Ivo Karlović	7–5, 6–7^{(5–7)}, 6–2, 7–6^{(7–4)}
Gentlemen's singles 2nd round	(Czech Republic) Lukáš Rosol	(Spain) Rafael Nadal [2]	6–7^{(9–11)}, 6–4, 6–4, 2–6, 6–4
Matches on No. 1 Court
Event	Winner	Loser	Score
Ladies' singles 2nd round	(Russia) Maria Sharapova [1]	(Bulgaria) Tsvetana Pironkova	7–6^{(7–3)}, 6–7^{(3–7)}, 6–0
Gentlemen's singles 2nd round	(United States) Mardy Fish [10]	(United Kingdom) James Ward [WC]	6–3, 5–7, 6–4, 6–7^{(3–7)}, 6–3
Gentlemen's singles 2nd round	(United States) Sam Querrey vs. (Canada) Milos Raonic [21]		6–7^{(3–7)}, 7–6^{(9–7)}, 3–3, suspended
Matches on No. 2 Court
Event	Winner	Loser	Score
Ladies' singles 2nd round	(Italy) Sara Errani [10]	(United Kingdom) Anne Keothavong	6–1, 6–1
Gentlemen's singles 2nd round	(Spain) David Ferrer [7]	(France) Kenny de Schepper [Q]	7–6^{(7–1)}, 6–2, 6–4
Gentlemen's singles 2nd round	(United States) Andy Roddick [30]	(Germany) Björn Phau	6–3, 7–6^{(7–1)}, 6–3
Ladies' singles 2nd round	(Belarus) Victoria Azarenka [2]	(Switzerland) Romina Oprandi	6–2, 6–0
Ladies' singles 2nd round	(Czech Republic) Petra Kvitová [4]	(United Kingdom) Elena Baltacha	6–0, 6–4
Matches on No. 3 Court
Event	Winner	Loser	Score
Gentlemen's singles 2nd round	(Belgium) Xavier Malisse	(France) Gilles Simon [13]	6–4, 6–4, 7–6^{(7–5)}
Ladies' singles 2nd round	(Serbia) Ana Ivanovic [14]	(Ukraine) Kateryna Bondarenko	6–3, 7–6^{(7–3)}
Gentlemen's singles 2nd round	(France) Jo-Wilfried Tsonga [5]	(Spain) Guillermo García López	6–7^{(3–7)}, 6–4, 6–1, 6–3
Mixed doubles 1st round	(United Kingdom) Dominic Inglot [WC] (United Kingdom) Laura Robson [WC]	(United States) Scott Lipsky (South Africa) Natalie Grandin	7–6^{(7–2)}, 6–4

=== Day 5 (29 June) ===
- Seeds out:
  - Gentlemen's singles: (Serbia) Janko Tipsarević [8], (Spain) Nicolás Almagro [12], (Argentina) Juan Mónaco [15], (Spain) Fernando Verdasco [17], (Canada) Milos Raonic [21], (Czech Republic) Radek Štěpánek [28], (France) Julien Benneteau [29]
  - Ladies' singles: (Russia) Vera Zvonareva [12], (Russia) Nadia Petrova [20], (Spain) Anabel Medina Garrigues [26], (United States) Christina McHale [28]
  - Gentlemen's doubles: (Belarus) Max Mirnyi / (Canada) Daniel Nestor [1], (Mexico) Santiago González / (Germany) Christopher Kas [12], (United States) Eric Butorac / (United Kingdom) Jamie Murray [14]
  - Ladies' doubles: (Czech Republic) Květa Peschke / (Slovenia) Katarina Srebotnik [3], (Czech Republic) Iveta Benešová / (Czech Republic) Barbora Záhlavová-Strýcová [8]
- Schedule of Play

Matches on main courts
Matches on Centre Court
Event	Winner	Loser	Score
Gentlemen's singles 3rd Round	(Serbia) Novak Djokovic [1]	(Czech Republic) Radek Štěpánek [28]	4–6, 6–2, 6–2, 6–2
Ladies' singles 3rd Round	(Poland) Agnieszka Radwańska [3]	(United Kingdom) Heather Watson	6–0, 6–2
Gentlemen's singles 3rd Round	(Switzerland) Roger Federer [3]	(France) Julien Benneteau [29]	4–6, 6–7^{(3–7)}, 6–2, 7–6^{(8–6)}, 6–1
Matches on No. 1 Court
Event	Winner	Loser	Score
Gentlemen's singles 2nd round	(United States) Sam Querrey	(Canada) Milos Raonic [21]	6–7^{(3–7)}, 7–6^{(9–7)}, 7–6^{(10–8)}, 6–4
Ladies' singles 3rd Round	(Russia) Maria Sharapova [1]	(Chinese Taipei) Hsieh Su-wei	6–1, 6–4
Ladies' singles 3rd Round	(Belgium) Kim Clijsters	(Russia) Vera Zvonareva [12]	6–3, 4–3 ret.
Gentlemen's singles 3rd Round	(France) Richard Gasquet [18]	(Spain) Nicolás Almagro [12]	6–3, 6–4, 6–4
Matches on No. 2 Court
Event	Winner	Loser	Score
Gentlemen's singles 3rd Round	(Serbia) Viktor Troicki	(Argentina) Juan Mónaco [15]	7–5, 7–5, 6–3
Ladies' singles 3rd Round	(Germany) Angelique Kerber [8]	(United States) Christina McHale [28]	6–2, 6–3
Gentlemen's singles 3rd Round	(Russia) Mikhail Youzhny [26]	(Serbia) Janko Tipsarević [8]	6–3, 6–4, 3–6, 6–3
Matches on No. 3 Court
Event	Winner	Loser	Score
Ladies' singles 3rd Round	(Germany) Sabine Lisicki [15]	(United States) Sloane Stephens	7–6^{(7–5)}, 1–6, 6–2
Gentlemen's singles 3rd Round	(Belgium) Xavier Malisse	(Spain) Fernando Verdasco [17]	1–6, 7–6^{(7–5)}, 6–1, 4–6, 6–3
Ladies' singles 3rd Round	(Italy) Camila Giorgi [Q]	(Russia) Nadia Petrova	6–3, 7–6^{(8–6)}

=== Day 6 (30 June) ===
- Seeds out:
  - Gentlemen's singles: (Japan) Kei Nishikori [19], (United States) Andy Roddick [30]
  - Ladies' singles: (Italy) Sara Errani [10], (Germany) Julia Görges [22], (China) Zheng Jie [25]
  - Gentlemen's doubles: (Brazil) André Sá / (Brazil) Bruno Soares [16]
  - Ladies' doubles: (Romania) Irina-Camelia Begu / (Romania) Monica Niculescu [15]
  - Mixed Doubles: (India) Mahesh Bhupathi / (India) Sania Mirza [5], (Austria) Jürgen Melzer / (Czech Republic) Iveta Benešová [12], (Italy) Fabio Fognini / (Italy) Sara Errani [13], (Spain) David Marrero / (Spain) Nuria Llagostera Vives [14]
- Schedule of Play

Matches on main courts
Matches on Centre Court
Event	Winner	Loser	Score
Ladies' singles 3rd Round	(United States) Serena Williams [6]	(China) Zheng Jie [25]	6–7^{(5–7)}, 6–2, 9–7
Gentlemen's singles 3rd Round	(Spain) David Ferrer [7]	(United States) Andy Roddick [30]	2–6, 7–6^{(10–8)}, 6–4, 6–3
Gentlemen's singles 3rd Round	(United Kingdom) Andy Murray [4]	(Cyprus) Marcos Baghdatis	7–5, 3–6, 7–5, 6–1
Matches on No. 1 Court
Event	Winner	Loser	Score
Ladies' singles 3rd Round	(Czech Republic) Petra Kvitová [4]	(United States) Varvara Lepchenko	6–1, 6–0
Gentlemen's singles 3rd Round	(Argentina) Juan Martín del Potro [9]	(Japan) Kei Nishikori [19]	6–3, 7–6^{(7–3)}, 6–1
Gentlemen's singles 3rd Round	(France) Jo-Wilfried Tsonga [5]	(Slovakia) Lukáš Lacko	6–4, 6–3, 6–3
Mixed doubles 2nd round	(United Kingdom) Dominic Inglot [WC] (United Kingdom) Laura Robson [WC]	(Austria) Jürgen Melzer [12] (Czech Republic) Iveta Benešová [12]	6–3, 3–6, 6–1
Matches on No. 2 Court
Event	Winner	Loser	Score
Ladies' singles 3rd Round	(Serbia) Ana Ivanovic [14]	(Germany) Julia Görges [22]	3–6, 6–3, 6–4
Ladies' singles 3rd Round	(Belarus) Victoria Azarenka [2]	(Slovakia) Jana Čepelová [Q]	6–3, 6–3
Gentlemen's singles 3rd Round	(Croatia) Marin Čilić [16]	(United States) Sam Querrey	7–6^{(8–6)}, 6–4, 6–7^{(2–7)}, 6–7^{(3–7)}, 17–15
Matches on No. 3 Court
Event	Winner	Loser	Score
Gentlemen's singles 3rd Round	(United States) Brian Baker [Q]	(France) Benoît Paire	6–4, 4–6, 6–1, 6–3
Ladies' singles 3rd Round	(Kazakhstan) Yaroslava Shvedova [WC]	(United States) Sara Errani [10]	6–0, 6–4
Gentlemen's singles 3rd Round	(United States) Mardy Fish [10]	(Belgium) David Goffin [WC]	6–3, 7–6^{(8–6)}, 7–6^{(8–6)}
Mixed doubles 1st round	(Kazakhstan) Mikhail Kukushkin (Kazakhstan) Yaroslava Shvedova	(South Africa) Kevin Anderson (South Africa) Chanelle Scheepers	7–5, 7–6^{(7–2)}

=== Middle Sunday (1 July) ===
Following tradition, Middle Sunday is a day of rest, with no matches scheduled. Play resumes on the next day.

=== Day 7 (2 July) ===
- Seeds out:
  - Ladies’ Singles: (Russia) Maria Sharapova [1], (Serbia) Ana Ivanovic [14], (Italy) Roberta Vinci [21], (Italy) Francesca Schiavone [24], (China) Peng Shuai [30]
- Schedule of Play

Matches on main courts
Matches on Centre Court
Event	Winner	Loser	Score
Gentlemen's singles 4th Round	(Switzerland) Roger Federer [3]	(Belgium) Xavier Malisse	7–6^{(7–1)}, 6–1, 4–6, 6–3
Ladies' singles 4th Round	(Belarus) Victoria Azarenka [2]	(Serbia) Ana Ivanovic [14]	6–1, 6–0
Gentlemen's singles 4th Round	(Serbia) Novak Djokovic [1]	(Serbia) Viktor Troicki	6–3, 6–1, 6–3
Matches on No. 1 Court
Event	Winner	Loser	Score
Ladies' singles 4th Round	(Germany) Sabine Lisicki [15]	(Russia) Maria Sharapova [1]	6–4, 6–3
Gentlemen's singles 4th Round	(Croatia) Marin Čilić [16] vs. (United Kingdom) Andy Murray [4]		5–7, 1–3, suspended
Matches on No. 2 Court
Event	Winner	Loser	Score
Ladies' singles 4th Round	(United States) Serena Williams [6]	(Kazakhstan) Yaroslava Shvedova [WC]	6–1, 2–6, 7–5
Ladies' singles 4th Round	(Poland) Agnieszka Radwańska [3]	(Italy) Camila Giorgi [Q]	6–2, 6–3
Gentlemen's singles 4th Round	(France) Jo-Wilfried Tsonga [5] vs. (United States) Mardy Fish [10]		4–6, 1–1, suspended
Matches on No. 3 Court
Event	Winner	Loser	Score
Ladies' singles 4th Round	(Czech Republic) Petra Kvitová [4]	(Italy) Francesca Schiavone [24]	4–6, 7–5, 6–1
Ladies' singles 4th Round	(Germany) Angelique Kerber [8]	(Belgium) Kim Clijsters	6–1, 6–1
Gentlemen's singles 4th Round	(France) Richard Gasquet [18] vs. (Germany) Florian Mayer [31]		3–6, 1–2, suspended

=== Day 8 (3 July) ===
- Seeds out:
  - Gentlemen's singles: (Argentina) Juan Martín del Potro [9], (United States) Mardy Fish [10], (Croatia) Marin Čilić [16], (France) Richard Gasquet [18]
  - Ladies' singles: (Czech Republic) Petra Kvitová [4], (Germany) Sabine Lisicki [15], (Russia) Maria Kirilenko [17]
  - Gentlemen's doubles: (India) Leander Paes / (Czech Republic) Radek Štěpánek [4], (India) Mahesh Bhupathi / (India) Rohan Bopanna [7], (Pakistan) Aisam-ul-Haq Qureshi / (Netherlands) Jean-Julien Rojer [8]
  - Ladies' doubles: (Kazakhstan) Yaroslava Shvedova / (Kazakhstan) Galina Voskoboeva [7], (South Africa) Natalie Grandin / (Czech Republic) Vladimíra Uhlířová [11]
- Schedule of Play

Matches on main courts
Matches on Centre Court
Event	Winner	Loser	Score
Gentlemen's singles 4th Round	(Spain) David Ferrer [7]	(Argentina) Juan Martín del Potro [9]	6–3, 6–2, 6–3
Ladies' singles Quarterfinals	(United States) Serena Williams [6]	(Czech Republic) Petra Kvitová [4]	6–3, 7–5
Ladies' singles Quarterfinals	(Germany) Angelique Kerber [8]	(Germany) Sabine Lisicki [15]	6–3, 6–7^{(7–9)}, 7–5
Ladies' singles Quarterfinals	(Belarus) Victoria Azarenka [2]	(Austria) Tamira Paszek	6–3, 7–6^{(7–4)}
Ladies' singles Quarterfinals	(Poland) Agnieszka Radwańska [3]	(Russia) Maria Kirilenko [17]	7–5, 4–6, 7–5
Matches on No. 1 Court
Event	Winner	Loser	Score
Gentlemen's singles 4th Round	(United Kingdom) Andy Murray [4]	(Croatia) Marin Čilić [16]	7–5, 6–2, 6–3
Matches on No. 2 Court
Event	Winner	Loser	Score
Gentlemen's singles 4th Round	(France) Jo-Wilfried Tsonga [5]	(United States) Mardy Fish [10]	4–6, 7–6^{(7–4)}, 6–4, 6–4
Gentlemen's doubles 3rd Round	(Belgium) Steve Darcis / (Belgium) Olivier Rochus vs. (Sweden) Robert Lindstedt [5] / (Romania) Horia Tecău [5]		4–6, suspended
Matches on No. 3 Court
Event	Winner	Loser	Score
Gentlemen's singles 4th Round	(Germany) Florian Mayer [31]	(France) Richard Gasquet [18]	6–3, 6–1, 3–6, 6–2
Senior Gentlemen's Invitation Doubles Round Robin	(India) Mansour Bahrami (France) Henri Leconte	(Australia) Peter McNamara (Australia) Paul McNamee	7–6^{(7–2)}, 6–4
Gentlemen's Invitation Doubles Round Robin	(Sweden) Thomas Enqvist (Australia) Mark Philippoussis	(Netherlands) Richard Krajicek (United Kingdom) Mark Petchey	6–3, 6–4

=== Day 9 (4 July) ===
- Seeds out:
  - Gentlemen's singles: (Spain) David Ferrer [7], (Russia) Mikhail Youzhny [26], (Germany) Philipp Kohlschreiber [27], (Germany) Florian Mayer [31]
  - Ladies' doubles: (Russia) Maria Kirilenko / (Russia) Nadia Petrova [4], (Russia) Ekaterina Makarova / (Russia) Elena Vesnina [5], (United States) Bethanie Mattek-Sands / (India) Sania Mirza [13]
  - Mixed Doubles: (Italy) Daniele Bracciali / (Italy) Roberta Vinci [6], (Pakistan) Aisam-ul-Haq Qureshi / (Czech Republic) Andrea Hlaváčková [7], (Poland) Mariusz Fyrstenberg / (United States) Abigail Spears [9], (Austria) Alexander Peya / (Germany) Anna-Lena Grönefeld [16]
- Schedule of Play

Matches on main courts
Matches on Centre Court
Event	Winner	Loser	Score
Gentlemen's singles Quarterfinals	(Switzerland) Roger Federer [3]	(Russia) Mikhail Youzhny [26]	6–1, 6–2, 6–2
Gentlemen's singles Quarterfinals	(United Kingdom) Andy Murray [4]	(Spain) David Ferrer [7]	6–7^{(5–7)}, 7–6^{(8–6)}, 6–4, 7–6^{(7–4)}
Matches on No. 1 Court
Event	Winner	Loser	Score
Gentlemen's singles Quarterfinals	(Serbia) Novak Djokovic [1]	(Germany) Florian Mayer [31]	6–4, 6–1, 6–4
Gentlemen's singles Quarterfinals	(France) Jo-Wilfried Tsonga [5]	(Germany) Philipp Kohlschreiber [27]	7–6^{(7–5)}, 4–6, 7–6^{(7–3)}, 6–2
Ladies' doubles Quarterfinals	(Spain) Nuria Llagostera Vives [9] / (Spain) María José Martínez Sánchez [9] vs. (Italy) Flavia Pennetta / (Italy) Francesca Schiavone		2–6, 7–6^{(7–0)}, 2–2, suspended
Matches on No. 2 Court
Event	Winner	Loser	Score
Gentlemen's doubles 3rd Round	(Sweden) Robert Lindstedt [5] (Romania) Horia Tecău [5]	(Belgium) Steve Darcis (Belgium) Olivier Rochus	6–4, 7–5, 7–6^{(7–4)}
Ladies' doubles 2nd round	(United States) Serena Williams (United States) Venus Williams	(Russia) Maria Kirilenko [4] (Russia) Nadia Petrova [4]	3–6, 6–3, 9–7
Mixed Doubles 3rd Round	(Serbia) Nenad Zimonjić [3] (Slovenia) Katarina Srebotnik [3]	(United Kingdom) Ken Skupski [WC] (United Kingdom) Melanie South [WC]	6–4, 6–7^{(5–7)}, 9–7
Ladies' doubles 3rd Round	(United States) Serena Williams (United States) Venus Williams	(United States) Bethanie Mattek-Sands [13] (India) Sania Mirza [13]	6–4, 6–3
Matches on No. 3 Court
Event	Winner	Loser	Score
Ladies' doubles Quarterfinals	(United States) Liezel Huber [1] (United States) Lisa Raymond [1]	(Russia) Ekaterina Makarova [5] (Russia) Elena Vesnina [5]	7–6^{(7–4)}, 6–3
Ladies' doubles 3rd Round	(Italy) Sara Errani [2] (Italy) Roberta Vinci [2]	(Poland) Agnieszka Radwańska (Poland) Urszula Radwańska	Walkover
Gentlemen's doubles Quarterfinals	(United Kingdom) Jonathan Marray [WC] (Denmark) Frederik Nielsen [WC]	(United States) James Cerretani (France) Édouard Roger-Vasselin	7–6^{(7–5)}, 7–6^{(7–4)}, 6–7^{(3–7)}, 2–6, 6–2
Mixed Doubles 3rd Round	(India) Rohan Bopanna [10] (China) Zheng Jie [10]	(Italy) Daniele Bracciali [6] (Italy) Roberta Vinci [6]	6–0, 6–3
Senior Gentlemen's Invitation Doubles Round Robin	(United Kingdom) Jeremy Bates (Sweden) Anders Järryd	(Australia) Darren Cahill (United States) Brad Gilbert	6–4, 6–1

=== Day 10 (5 July) ===
- Seeds out:
  - Ladies' singles: (Germany) Angelique Kerber [8], (Belarus) Victoria Azarenka [2]
  - Gentlemen's doubles: (Croatia) Ivan Dodig / (Brazil) Marcelo Melo [15]
  - Ladies' doubles: (Italy) Sara Errani / (Italy) Roberta Vinci [2], (Spain) Nuria Llagostera Vives / (Spain) María José Martínez Sánchez [9], (United States) Raquel Kops-Jones / (United States) Abigail Spears [10]
  - Mixed Doubles: (India) Rohan Bopanna / (China) Zheng Jie [10], (Israel) Andy Ram / (Czech Republic) Květa Peschke [15]
- Schedule of Play

Matches on main courts
Matches on Centre Court
Event	Winner	Loser	Score
Ladies' singles Semifinals	(Poland) Agnieszka Radwańska [3]	(Germany) Angelique Kerber [8]	6–3, 6–4
Ladies' singles Semifinals	(United States) Serena Williams [6]	(Belarus) Victoria Azarenka [2]	6–3, 7–6^{(8–6)}
Mixed Doubles 3rd Round	(United Kingdom) Colin Fleming (Chinese Taipei) Hsieh Su-wei	(United Kingdom) Dominic Inglot [WC] (United Kingdom) Laura Robson [WC]	7–6^{(7–3)}, 7–6^{(7–3)}
Ladies' doubles Quarterfinals	(United States) Serena Williams (United States) Venus Williams	(United States) Raquel Kops-Jones [10] (United States) Abigail Spears [10]	6–1, 6–1
Matches on No. 1 Court
Event	Winner	Loser	Score
Gentlemen's doubles Quarterfinals	(United States) Bob Bryan [2] (United States) Mike Bryan [2]	(United States) Scott Lipsky (United States) Rajeev Ram	5–7, 6–3, 5–7, 6–4, 6–4
Ladies' doubles Quarterfinals	(Italy) Flavia Pennetta (Italy) Francesca Schiavone	(Spain) Nuria Llagostera Vives [9] (Spain) María José Martínez Sánchez [9]	6–2, 6–7^{(0–7)}, 6–4
Mixed Doubles 3rd Round	(Australia) Paul Hanley (Russia) Alla Kudryavtseva	(Kazakhstan) Mikhail Kukushkin (Kazakhstan) Yaroslava Shvedova	7–6^{(8–6)}, 3–6, 7–5
Matches on No. 2 Court
Event	Winner	Loser	Score
Ladies' doubles Quarterfinals	(Czech Republic) Andrea Hlaváčková [6] (Czech Republic) Lucie Hradecká [6]	(Italy) Sara Errani [2] (Italy) Roberta Vinci [2]	6–3, 6–4
Gentlemen's Invitation Doubles Round Robin	(Sweden) Jonas Björkman (Australia) Todd Woodbridge	(Netherlands) Richard Krajicek (United Kingdom) Mark Petchey	6–2, 4–6, [10–8]
Senior Gentlemen's Invitation Doubles Round Robin	(United Kingdom) Jeremy Bates (Sweden) Anders Järryd	(United Kingdom) Andrew Castle (France) Guy Forget	6–2, 6–4
Ladies' Invitation Doubles Round Robin	(United States) Lindsay Davenport (Switzerland) Martina Hingis	(Czech Republic) Helena Suková (Hungary) Andrea Temesvári	6–2, 6–3
Mixed Doubles Quarterfinals	(United States) Mike Bryan [2] (United States) Lisa Raymond [2]	(India) Rohan Bopanna [10] (China) Zheng Jie [10]	6–2, 7–5
Matches on No. 3 Court
Event	Winner	Loser	Score
Gentlemen's doubles Quarterfinals	(Sweden) Robert Lindstedt [5] (Romania) Horia Tecău [5]	(Italy) Daniele Bracciali (Austria) Julian Knowle	6–4, 6–2, 6–4
Gentlemen's Invitation Doubles Round Robin	(Sweden) Thomas Enqvist (Australia) Mark Philippoussis	(South Africa) Wayne Ferreira (United Kingdom) Chris Wilkinson	6–3, 6–4
Mixed Doubles 3rd Round	(Canada) Daniel Nestor (Germany) Julia Görges	(Austria) Julian Knowle (Austria) Tamira Paszek	7–5, 4–6, 6–2
Mixed Doubles 3rd Round	(United States) Bob Bryan [1] (United States) Liezel Huber [1]	(Israel) Andy Ram [15] (Czech Republic) Květa Peschke [15]	3–6, 6–2, 6–1

=== Day 11 (6 July) ===
- Seeds out:
  - Gentlemen's singles: (Serbia) Novak Djokovic [1], (France) Jo-Wilfried Tsonga [5]
  - Gentlemen's doubles: (United States) Bob Bryan / (United States) Mike Bryan [2], (Austria) Jürgen Melzer / (Germany) Philipp Petzschner [10]
  - Ladies' doubles: (United States) Liezel Huber / (United States) Lisa Raymond [1]
  - Mixed Doubles: (Canada) Daniel Nestor / (Germany) Julia Görges [8]
- Schedule of Play

Matches on main courts
Matches on Centre Court
Event	Winner	Loser	Score
Gentlemen's singles Semifinals	(Switzerland) Roger Federer [3]	(Serbia) Novak Djokovic [1]	6–3, 3–6, 6–4, 6–3
Gentlemen's singles Semifinals	(United Kingdom) Andy Murray [4]	(France) Jo-Wilfried Tsonga [5]	6–3, 6–4, 3–6, 7–5
Matches on No. 1 Court
Event	Winner	Loser	Score
Ladies' doubles Semifinals	(United States) Serena Williams (United States) Venus Williams	(United States) Liezel Huber [1] (United States) Lisa Raymond [1]	2–6, 6–1, 6–2
Gentlemen's doubles Semifinals	(Sweden) Robert Lindstedt [5] (Romania) Horia Tecău [5]	(Austria) Jürgen Melzer [10] (Germany) Philipp Petzschner [10]	6–4, 6–7^{(10–12)}, 6–4, 6–3
Gentlemen's Invitation Doubles Round Robin	(Netherlands) Richard Krajicek (United Kingdom) Mark Petchey	(South Africa) Wayne Ferreira (United Kingdom) Chris Wilkinson	4–6, 6–1, [10–6]
Matches on No. 3 Court
Event	Winner	Loser	Score
Ladies' Invitation Doubles Round Robin	(United States) Martina Navratilova (Czech Republic) Jana Novotná	(Belgium) Sabine Appelmans (Austria) Barbara Schett	6–4, 3–6, [10–8]
Ladies' doubles Semifinals	(Czech Republic) Andrea Hlaváčková [6] (Czech Republic) Lucie Hradecká [6]	(Italy) Flavia Pennetta (Italy) Francesca Schiavone	2–6, 6–3, 6–4
Mixed Doubles Quarterfinals	(United States) Bob Bryan [1] (United States) Liezel Huber [1]	(Canada) Daniel Nestor [8] (Germany) Julia Görges [8]	7–5, 6–1

=== Day 12 (7 July) ===
- Seeds out:
  - Ladies' singles: (Poland) Agnieszka Radwańska [3]
  - Gentlemen's doubles: (Sweden) Robert Lindstedt / (Romania) Horia Tecău [5]
  - Ladies' doubles: (Czech Republic) Andrea Hlaváčková / (Czech Republic) Lucie Hradecká [6]
  - Mixed Doubles: (United States) Bob Bryan / (United States) Liezel Huber [1], (Serbia) Nenad Zimonjić / (Slovenia) Katarina Srebotnik [3]
- Schedule of Play

Matches on main courts
Matches on Centre Court
Event	Winner	Loser	Score
Ladies' singles Final	(United States) Serena Williams [6]	(Poland) Agnieszka Radwańska [3]	6–1, 5–7, 6–2
Gentlemen's doubles Final	(United Kingdom) Jonathan Marray [WC] (Denmark) Frederik Nielsen [WC]	(Sweden) Robert Lindstedt [5] (Romania) Horia Tecău [5]	4–6, 6–4, 7–6^{(7–5)}, 6–7^{(5–7)}, 6–3
Ladies' doubles Final	(United States) Serena Williams (United States) Venus Williams	(Czech Republic) Andrea Hlaváčková [6] (Czech Republic) Lucie Hradecká [6]	7–5, 6–4
Matches on No. 1 Court
Event	Winner	Loser	Score
Girls' Singles Final	(Canada) Eugenie Bouchard [5]	(Ukraine) Elina Svitolina [3]	6–2, 6–2
Mixed Doubles Semifinals	(United States) Mike Bryan [2] (United States) Lisa Raymond [2]	(Serbia) Nenad Zimonjić [3] (Slovenia) Katarina Srebotnik [3]	6–3, 6–4
Mixed Doubles Semifinals	(India) Leander Paes [4] (Russia) Elena Vesnina [4]	(United States) Bob Bryan [1] (United States) Liezel Huber [1]	7–5, 3–6, 6–3
Matches on No. 3 Court
Event	Winner	Loser	Score
Senior Gentlemen's Invitation Doubles Round Robin	(United States) Patrick McEnroe (Sweden) Joakim Nyström	(Iran) Mansour Bahrami (France) Henri Leconte	5–7, 7–5, [11–9]
Gentlemen's Invitation Doubles Round Robin	(Croatia) Goran Ivanišević (France) Fabrice Santoro	(United States) Justin Gimelstob (United States) Todd Martin	6–3, 7–6^{(7–4)}
Gentlemen's Invitation Doubles Final	(United Kingdom) Greg Rusedski (France) Mark Petchey	(Sweden) Thomas Enqvist (Australia) Mark Philippoussis	6–7^{(3–7)}, 6–4, [11–9]
Senior Gentlemen's Invitation Doubles Round Robin	(Australia) Pat Cash (Australia) Mark Woodforde	(Australia) Peter McNamara (Australia) Paul McNamee	6–3, 6–2

=== Day 13 (8 July) ===
- Seeds out:
  - Gentlemen's singles: (United Kingdom) Andy Murray [4]
  - Mixed Doubles: (India) Leander Paes / (Russia) Elena Vesnina [4]
- Schedule of Play

Matches on main courts
Matches on Centre Court
Event	Winner	Loser	Score
Gentlemen's singles Final	(Switzerland) Roger Federer [3]	(United Kingdom) Andy Murray [4]	4–6, 7–5, 6–3, 6–4
Mixed Doubles Final	(United States) Mike Bryan [2] (United States) Lisa Raymond [2]	(India) Leander Paes [4] (Russia) Elena Vesnina [4]	6–3, 5–7, 6–4
Matches on No. 1 Court
Event	Winner	Loser	Score
Boys' Singles Final	(Canada) Filip Peliwo [4]	(Australia) Luke Saville [1]	7–5, 6–4
Ladies' Invitation Doubles Final	(United States) Lindsay Davenport (Switzerland) Martina Hingis	(United States) Martina Navratilova (Czech Republic) Jana Novotná	6–3, 6–2
Boys' Doubles Final	(Australia) Andrew Harris [4] (Australia) Nick Kyrgios [4]	(Italy) Matteo Donati (Italy) Pietro Licciardi	6–2, 6–4
Senior Gentlemen's Invitation Doubles Final	(Australia) Pat Cash (Australia) Mark Woodforde	(United Kingdom) Jeremy Bates (Sweden) Anders Järryd	6–3, 6–4
Matches on No. 3 Court
Event	Winner	Loser	Score
Wheelchair Ladies' Doubles Final	(Netherlands) Jiske Griffioen (Netherlands) Aniek van Koot	(United Kingdom) Lucy Shuker (United Kingdom) Jordanne Whiley	6–1, 6–2
Wheelchair Gentlemen's Doubles Final	(Netherlands) Tom Egberink (France) Michaël Jeremiasz	(Netherlands) Robin Ammerlaan (Netherlands) Ronald Vink	6–4, 6–2
