= Ellen Allgurin =

Swedish tennis player

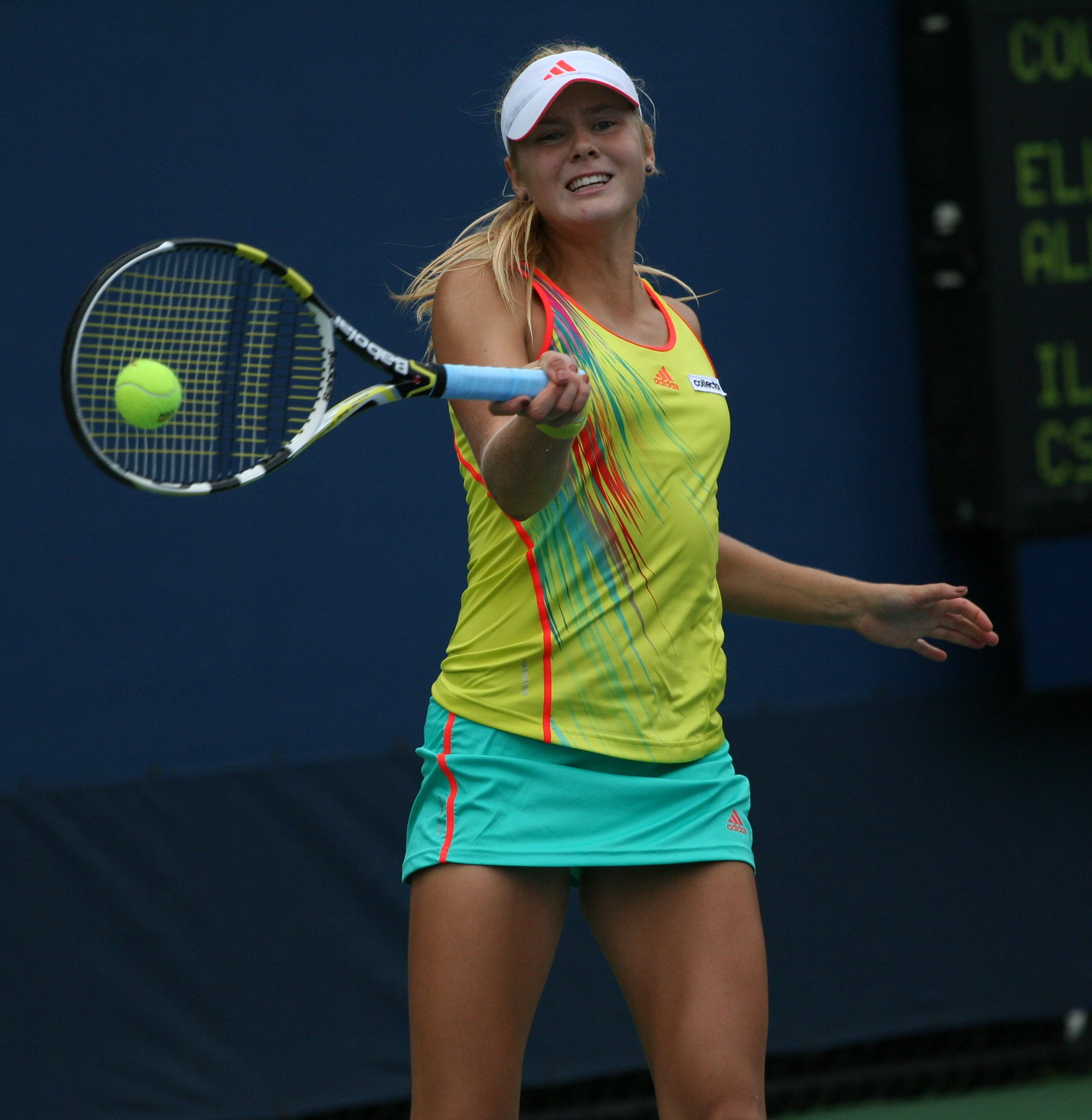
- Allgurin at the 2012 US Open
- Full name: Ellen Allgurin
- Country (sports): Sweden
- Born: 10 May 1994 (age 30); Värnamo, Sweden
- Prize money: $32,757

Singles
- Career record: 90–54
- Career titles: 2 ITF
- Highest ranking: 362 (4 May 2015)

Grand Slam singles results
- Australian Open Junior: 2R (2012)
- French Open Junior: 2R (2011)
- Wimbledon Junior: 2R (2011, 2012)
- US Open Junior: QF (2011)

Doubles
- Career record: 23–28
- Career titles: 2 ITF
- Highest ranking: 588 (12 August 2013)

Grand Slam doubles results
- Australian Open Junior: 1R (2011, 2012)
- French Open Junior: 1R (2011)
- Wimbledon Junior: 1R (2012)
- US Open Junior: 1R (2011, 2012)

Team competitions
- Fed Cup: 4–3

Ellen Allgurin (born 10 May 1994) is a Swedish tennis player.

Allgurin has won two singles and two doubles titles on the ITF tour in her career. On 4 May 2015, she reached her best singles ranking of world number 362. On 12 August 2013, she peaked at world number 588 in the doubles rankings.

Allgurin has a win–loss record of 4–3 for the Sweden Fed Cup team.

== ITF finals (4–5) ==
=== Singles (2–5) ===
Legend $100,000 tournaments $75,000 tournaments $50,000 tournaments $25,000 tournaments $15,000 tournaments $10,000 tournaments	Finals by surface Hard (2–3) Clay (0–1) Grass (0–0) Carpet (0–1)

Outcome	No.	Date	Tournament	Surface	Opponent	Score
Runner-up	1.	29 October 2012	Stockholm, Sweden	Hard (i)	(Latvia) Jeļena Ostapenko	1–6, 3–6
Runner-up	2.	18 February 2013	Helsingborg, Sweden	Carpet (i)	(Latvia) Jeļena Ostapenko	2–6, 6–7^{(3–7)}
Winner	1.	25 March 2013	Antalya, Turkey	Hard	(Slovakia) Chantal Škamlová	6–0, 3–6, 6–2
Runner-up	3.	1 April 2013	Antalya, Turkey	Hard	(Switzerland) Viktorija Golubic	4–6, 2–6
Runner-up	4.	6 May 2013	Båstad, Sweden	Clay	(Belgium) Ysaline Bonaventure	1–6, 2–6
Runner-up	5.	6 October 2014	Cairns, Australia	Hard	(Japan) Ayaka Okuno	1–6, 5–7
Winner	2.	13 October 2014	Toowoomba, Australia	Hard	(Australia) Jessica Moore	6–1, 6–3

=== Doubles (2–0) ===
Legend $100,000 tournaments $75,000 tournaments $50,000 tournaments $25,000 tournaments $15,000 tournaments $10,000 tournaments	Finals by surface Hard (0–0) Clay (1–0) Grass (0–0) Carpet (1–0)

Outcome	No.	Date	Tournament	Surface	Partner	Opponents	Score
Winner	1.	18 February 2013	Helsingborg, Sweden	Carpet (i)	(Latvia) Jeļena Ostapenko	(Sweden) Cornelia Lister (Netherlands) Lisanne van Riet	6–2, 6–7^{(4–7)}, [10–7]
Winner	2.	13 May 2013	Båstad, Sweden	Clay	(Sweden) Beatrice Cedermark	(Sweden) Rebecca Peterson (Sweden) Malin Ulvefeldt	6–3, 6–0
