= 2012 Wimbledon Championships – Girls' doubles =

Girls' doubles
- 2012 Wimbledon Championships

Final
- Champions: (Canada) Eugenie Bouchard (United States) Taylor Townsend
- Runners-up: (Switzerland) Belinda Bencic (Croatia) Ana Konjuh
- Score: 6–4, 6–3

Events
Singles	men	women		boys	girls
Doubles	men	women	mixed	boys	girls
WC Singles	men	women	quad
WC Doubles	men	women	quad
Legends	men	women	seniors
← 2011 ·	Wimbledon Championships	· 2013 →

Eugenie Bouchard and Grace Min were the defending champions but Min was no longer eligible to compete as a junior.

Bouchard and Taylor Townsend defeated Belinda Bencic and Ana Konjuh in the final, 6–4, 6–3 to win the girls' doubles tennis title at the 2012 Wimbledon Championships.

== Seeds ==
1. (Canada) Eugenie Bouchard / (United States) Taylor Townsend (champions)
2. (Russia) Daria Gavrilova / (Ukraine) Elina Svitolina (semifinals)
3. (Bolivia) María Inés Deheza / (Russia) Elizaveta Kulichkova (second round)
4. (Canada) Françoise Abanda / (United States) Sachia Vickery (semifinals)
5. (Netherlands) Indy de Vroome / (Estonia) Anett Kontaveit (quarterfinals)
6. (Kazakhstan) Anna Danilina / (Brazil) Beatriz Haddad Maia (quarterfinals)
7. (Switzerland) Belinda Bencic / (Croatia) Ana Konjuh (final)
8. (Paraguay) Montserrat González / (United States) Chalena Scholl (second round)

== Draw ==
=== Key ===
- Q = Qualifier
- WC = Wild card
- LL = Lucky loser
- Alt = Alternate
- SE = Special exempt
- PR = Protected ranking
- ITF = ITF entry
- JE = Junior exempt
- w/o = Walkover
- r = Retired
- d = Defaulted
- SR = Special ranking

=== Finals ===
Semifinals
1	(Canada) Eugenie Bouchard (United States) Taylor Townsend	7^{7}	7
4	(Canada) Françoise Abanda (United States) Sachia Vickery	6^{4}	5
7	(Switzerland) Belinda Bencic (Croatia) Ana Konjuh	5	6	6
2	(Russia) Daria Gavrilova (Ukraine) Elina Svitolina	7	3	1

Final
1	(Canada) Eugenie Bouchard (United States) Taylor Townsend	6	6
7	(Switzerland) Belinda Bencic (Croatia) Ana Konjuh	4	3

=== Top half ===
First round
1	(Canada) Eugenie Bouchard (United States) Taylor Townsend	6	6
(Argentina) Victoria Bosio (Argentina) Constanza Vega	1	0
(Egypt) Mayar Sherif (Indonesia) Aldila Sutjiadi	6	3	[8]
(Ukraine) Viktoriya Lushkova (Slovakia) Petra Uberalová	4	6	[10]
(Romania) Ilka Csöregi (Latvia) Jeļena Ostapenko	6	6
WC	(United Kingdom) Sarah Beth Askew (United Kingdom) Katy Dunne	3	3
(Austria) Barbara Haas (Uzbekistan) Sabina Sharipova	0	2
6	(Kazakhstan) Anna Danilina (Brazil) Beatriz Haddad Maia	6	6
4	(Canada) Françoise Abanda (United States) Sachia Vickery	6	6
(Croatia) Adrijana Lekaj (Australia) Storm Sanders	1	2
(Russia) Varvara Flink (Germany) Antonia Lottner	6	6
WC	(United Kingdom) Lana Rush (United Kingdom) Georgina Sellyn	2	1
(Belgium) Elke Lemmens (Belgium) Elise Mertens	4	6	[10]
(Russia) Daria Kasatkina (Russia) Anastasiya Komardina	6	1	[3]
(United States) Jennifer Brady (United States) Kyle McPhillips	6^{3}	6	[9]
8	(Paraguay) Montserrat González (United States) Chalena Scholl	7^{7}	0	[11]

Second round
1	(Canada) E Bouchard (United States) T Townsend	6	6
(Ukraine) V Lushkova (Slovakia) P Uberalová	1	4
(Romania) I Csöregi (Latvia) J Ostapenko	6^{2}	7	[8]
6	(Kazakhstan) A Danilina (Brazil) B Haddad Maia	7^{7}	5	[10]
4	(Canada) F Abanda (United States) S Vickery	6^{3}	7^{7}	[10]
(Russia) V Flink (Germany) A Lottner	7^{7}	6^{3}	[7]
(Belgium) E Lemmens (Belgium) E Mertens	7^{7}	6
8	(Paraguay) M González (United States) C Scholl	6^{4}	3

Quarterfinals
1	(Canada) E Bouchard (United States) T Townsend	6	6
6	(Kazakhstan) A Danilina (Brazil) B Haddad Maia	3	4
4	(Canada) F Abanda (United States) S Vickery	6	7
(Belgium) E Lemmens (Belgium) E Mertens	2	5

Semifinals
1	(Canada) E Bouchard (United States) T Townsend	7^{7}	7
4	(Canada) F Abanda (United States) S Vickery	6^{4}	5

=== Bottom half ===
First round
7	(Switzerland) Belinda Bencic (Croatia) Ana Konjuh	6	6
WC	(United Kingdom) Jasmine Amber Asghar (United Kingdom) Eden Silva	1	2
(New Zealand) Emily Fanning (Ukraine) Oleksandra Korashvili	6	3	[10]
(Belarus) Aliaksandra Sasnovich (Croatia) Donna Vekić	4	6	[8]
(United States) Allie Kiick (Canada) Carol Zhao	6^{4}	6	[7]
(Canada) Erin Routliffe (Russia) Daria Salnikova	7^{7}	4	[10]
(United States) Catherine Harrison (United States) Christina Makarova	4	5
3	(Bolivia) María Inés Deheza (Russia) Elizaveta Kulichkova	6	7
5	(Netherlands) Indy de Vroome (Estonia) Anett Kontaveit	6	3	[10]
(Sweden) Ellen Allgurin (Sweden) Rebecca Peterson	4	6	[8]
(Czech Republic) Barbora Krejčíková (Romania) Ioana Loredana Roșca	6	6
(Poland) Zuzanna Maciejewska (Italy) Camilla Rosatello	3	4
WC	(United Kingdom) Harriet Dart (United Kingdom) Pippa Horn	3	1
(Russia) Olga Doroshina (Czech Republic) Kateřina Siniaková	6	6
(Brazil) Laura Pigossi (Mexico) Marcela Zacarías	6	3	[6]
2	(Russia) Daria Gavrilova (Ukraine) Elina Svitolina	3	6	[10]

Second round
7	(Switzerland) B Bencic (Croatia) A Konjuh	6	6
(New Zealand) E Fanning (Ukraine) O Korashvili	1	4
(Canada) E Routliffe (Russia) D Salnikova	6	6
3	(Bolivia) MI Deheza (Russia) E Kulichkova	4	3
5	(Netherlands) I de Vroome (Estonia) A Kontaveit	1	6	[10]
(Czech Republic) B Krejčíková (Romania) IL Roșca	6	2	[4]
(Russia) O Doroshina (Czech Republic) K Siniaková	2	6^{6}
2	(Russia) D Gavrilova (Ukraine) E Svitolina	6	7^{8}

Quarterfinals
7	(Switzerland) B Bencic (Croatia) A Konjuh	6	6
(Canada) E Routliffe (Russia) D Salnikova	4	3
5	(Netherlands) I de Vroome (Estonia) A Kontaveit	4	6	[8]
2	(Russia) D Gavrilova (Ukraine) E Svitolina	6	2	[10]

Semifinals
7	(Switzerland) B Bencic (Croatia) A Konjuh	5	6	6
2	(Russia) D Gavrilova (Ukraine) E Svitolina	7	3	1
