= 2012 Wimbledon Championships – Senior gentlemen's invitation doubles =

Senior gentlemen's invitation doubles
- 2012 Wimbledon Championships

Final
- Champions: (Australia) Pat Cash (Australia) Mark Woodforde
- Runners-up: (United Kingdom) Jeremy Bates (Sweden) Anders Järryd
- Score: 6–3, 6–4

Events
Singles	men	women		boys	girls
Doubles	men	women	mixed	boys	girls
WC Singles	men	women	quad
WC Doubles	men	women	quad
Legends	men	women	seniors
← 2011 ·	Wimbledon Championships	· 2013 →

Pat Cash and Mark Woodforde successfully defended their title, defeating Jeremy Bates and Anders Järryd in the final, 6–3, 6–4 to win the senior gentlemen's invitation doubles tennis title at the 2012 Wimbledon Championships.

== Draw ==
=== Key ===
- Q = Qualifier
- WC = Wild card
- LL = Lucky loser
- Alt = Alternate
- ITF = ITF entry
- PR = Protected ranking
- SR = Special ranking
- SE = Special exempt
- JE = Junior exempt
- JR = Junior Accelerator Programme entrant
- CO = College Accelerator Programme entrant
- NG = Next Gen Accelerator Program entrant
- w/o = Walkover
- r = Retired
- d = Defaulted

=== Final ===
Final
(Australia) Pat Cash (Australia) Mark Woodforde	6	6
(United Kingdom) Jeremy Bates (Sweden) Anders Järryd	3	4

=== Group A ===
	(Iran) Bahrami (France) Leconte	(Australia) Cash (Australia) Woodforde	(United States) McEnroe (Sweden) Nyström	(Australia) McNamara (Australia) McNamee	RR; W–L	Set; W–L	Game; W–L	Standings
(Iran) Mansour Bahrami (France) Henri Leconte		5–7, 3–6	7–5, 5–7, [9–11]	7–6^{(7–2)}, 6–4	1–2	3–4	33–36	3
(Australia) Pat Cash (Australia) Mark Woodforde	7–5, 6–3		6–3, 6–1	6–3, 6–2	3–0	6–0	37–17	1
(United States) Patrick McEnroe (Sweden) Joakim Nyström	5–7, 7–5, [11–9]	3–6, 1–6		6–7^{(3–7)}, 7–6^{(7–4)}, [10–6]	2–1	4–4	31–37	2
(Australia) Peter McNamara (Australia) Paul McNamee	6–7^{(2–7)}, 4–6	3–6, 2–6	7–6^{(7–3)}, 6–7^{(4–7)}, [6–10]		0–3	1–6	28–39	4

Standings are determined by: 1. number of wins; 2. number of matches; 3. in two-players-ties, head-to-head records; 4. in three-players-ties, percentage of sets won, or of games won; 5. steering-committee decision.

=== Group B ===
	(United Kingdom) Bates (Sweden) Järryd	(Australia) Cahill (United States) Gilbert	(United Kingdom) Castle (France) Forget	(United States) Curren (United States) Kriek	RR; W–L	Set; W–L	Game; W–L	Standings
(United Kingdom) Jeremy Bates (Sweden) Anders Järryd		6–4, 6–1	6–2, 6–4	6–3, 6–4	3–0	6–0	36–18	1
(Australia) Darren Cahill (United States) Brad Gilbert	4–6, 1–6		3–6, 1–6	6–3, 4–6, [9–11]	0–3	1-6	19–34	4
(United Kingdom) Andrew Castle (France) Guy Forget	2–6, 4–6	6–3, 6–1		4–6, 6–1, [10–6]	2–1	4–3	26–26	2
(United States) Kevin Curren (United States) Johan Kriek	3–6, 4–6	3–6, 6–4, [11–9]	6–4, 1–6, [6–10]		1–2	3–5	27–30	3

Standings are determined by: 1. number of wins; 2. number of matches; 3. in two-players-ties, head-to-head records; 4. in three-players-ties, percentage of sets won, or of games won; 5. steering-committee decision.
