= 2012 Wimbledon Championships – Girls' singles =

Girls' singles
- 2012 Wimbledon Championships

Final
- Champion: (Canada) Eugenie Bouchard
- Runner-up: (Ukraine) Elina Svitolina
- Score: 6–2, 6–2

Details
- Draw: 64 (8 Q / 8 WC )
- Seeds: 16

Events
| Singles | men | women | | boys | girls |
| Doubles | men | women | mixed | boys | girls |
| WC Singles | men | women | quad |
| WC Doubles | men | women | quad |
| Legends | men | women | seniors |
| ← 2011 · | Wimbledon Championships | · 2013 → |

Eugenie Bouchard defeated Elina Svitolina in the final, 6–2, 6–2 to win the girls' singles title at the 2012 Wimbledon Championships.

Ashleigh Barty was the defending champion, but chose to compete in the women's singles competition after receiving a wildcard. She lost to 21st seed Roberta Vinci in the first round.

== Seeds ==
1. (United States) Taylor Townsend (third round)
2. (Russia) Elizaveta Kulichkova (second round)
3. (Ukraine) Elina Svitolina (final)
4. (Kazakhstan) Anna Danilina (second round)
5. (Canada) Eugenie Bouchard (champion)
6. (Czech Republic) Kateřina Siniaková (third round)
7. (United States) Sachia Vickery (third round)
8. (Croatia) Donna Vekić (quarterfinals)
9. (Russia) Daria Gavrilova (first round)
10. (United States) Chalena Scholl (first round)
11. (Estonia) Anett Kontaveit (semifinals)
12. (Netherlands) Indy de Vroome (third round)
13. (United States) Allie Kiick (third round)
14. (Canada) Françoise Abanda (semifinals)
15. (Bolivia) María Inés Deheza (first round)
16. (Croatia) Ana Konjuh (quarterfinals)

Click on the seed number of a player to go to their draw section.

== Draw ==
=== Key ===
- Q = Qualifier
- WC = Wild card
- LL = Lucky loser
- Alt = Alternate
- SE = Special exempt
- PR = Protected ranking
- ITF = ITF entry
- JE = Junior exempt
- w/o = Walkover
- r = Retired
- d = Defaulted
- SR = Special ranking

=== Finals ===
Quarterfinals
14 | (Canada) Françoise Abanda | 6 | 6
8 | (Croatia) Donna Vekić | 3 | 4
3 | (Ukraine) Elina Svitolina | 6 | 6
(Uzbekistan) Sabina Sharipova | 3 | 2
11 | (Estonia) Anett Kontaveit | 6 | 6
16 | (Croatia) Ana Konjuh | 0 | 4
5 | (Canada) Eugenie Bouchard | 4 | 6 | 6
WC | (Germany) Antonia Lottner | 6 | 0 | 2

Semifinals
14 | (Canada) Françoise Abanda | 4 | 6 | 2
3 | (Ukraine) Elina Svitolina | 6 | 3 | 6
11 | (Estonia) Anett Kontaveit | 6^{3} | 4
5 | (Canada) Eugenie Bouchard | 7^{7} | 6

Final
3 | (Ukraine) Elina Svitolina | 2 | 2
5 | (Canada) Eugenie Bouchard | 6 | 6

=== Top half ===
==== Section 1 ====
First round
1 | (United States) Taylor Townsend | 6 | 6
(Argentina) Constanza Vega | 1 | 1
(Brazil) Laura Pigossi | 7^{7} | 6
WC | (United Kingdom) Lana Rush | 6^{4} | 3
(Egypt) Mayar Sherif | 7 | 6
WC | (Liechtenstein) Kathinka von Deichmann | 5 | 3
(Russia) Daria Salnikova | 6 | 3 | 1
14 | (Canada) Françoise Abanda | 1 | 6 | 6
12 | (Netherlands) Indy de Vroome | 7^{7} | 6
Q | (Ukraine) Viktoriya Lushkova | 6^{1} | 0
(Switzerland) Belinda Bencic | 6 | 6
(New Zealand) Emily Fanning | 1 | 3
(Russia) Daria Kasatkina | 0 | 5
(Romania) Ioana Loredana Roșca | 6 | 7
(United States) Christina Makarova | 3 | 4
8 | (Croatia) Donna Vekić | 6 | 6

Second round
1 | (United States) T Townsend | 4 | 6 | 6
(Brazil) L Pigossi | 6 | 1 | 4
(Egypt) M Sherif | 4 | 2
14 | (Canada) F Abanda | 6 | 6
12 | (Netherlands) I de Vroome | 7^{8} | 4 | 7
(Switzerland) B Bencic | 6^{6} | 6 | 5
(Romania) IL Roșca | 4 | 2
8 | (Croatia) D Vekić | 6 | 6

Third round
1 | (United States) T Townsend | 4 | 3
14 | (Canada) F Abanda | 6 | 6
12 | (Netherlands) I de Vroome | 3 | 7 | 2
8 | (Croatia) D Vekić | 6 | 5 | 6

Quarterfinals
14 | (Canada) F Abanda | 6 | 6
8 | (Croatia) D Vekić | 3 | 4

==== Section 2 ====
First round
3 | (Ukraine) Elina Svitolina | 6 | 6
(Belgium) Elke Lemmens | 4 | 1
(Poland) Zuzanna Maciejewska | 6 | 7^{9}
WC | (Latvia) Jeļena Ostapenko | 2 | 6^{7}
WC | (United Kingdom) Pippa Horn | 1 | 4
(Indonesia) Aldila Sutjiadi | 6 | 6
(Canada) Carol Zhao | 6 | 4 | 2
13 | (United States) Allie Kiick | 4 | 6 | 6
9 | (Russia) Daria Gavrilova | 5 | 6 | 6
(Mexico) Marcela Zacarías | 7 | 4 | 8
WC | (United Kingdom) Harriet Dart | 2 | 4
(Uzbekistan) Sabina Sharipova | 6 | 6
(United States) Kyle McPhillips | 7 | 6
(Belarus) Aliaksandra Sasnovich | 5 | 1
Q | (Australia) Storm Sanders | 2 | 6 | 3
6 | (Czech Republic) Kateřina Siniaková | 6 | 4 | 6

Second round
3 | (Ukraine) E Svitolina | 6^{5} | 6 | 6
(Poland) Z Maciejewska | 7 | 4 | 2
(Indonesia) A Sutjiadi | 3 | 4
13 | (United States) A Kiick | 6 | 6
(Mexico) M Zacarías | 3 | 2
(Uzbekistan) S Sharipova | 6 | 6
(United States) K McPhillips | 1 | 7 | 1
6 | (Czech Republic) K Siniaková | 6 | 6^{5} | 6

Third round
3 | (Ukraine) E Svitolina | 7^{7} | 3 | 6
13 | (United States) A Kiick | 6^{2} | 6 | 2
(Uzbekistan) S Sharipova | 3 | 6 | 6
6 | (Czech Republic) K Siniaková | 6 | 1 | 3

Quarterfinals
3 | (Ukraine) E Svitolina | 6 | 6
(Uzbekistan) S Sharipova | 3 | 2

=== Bottom half ===
==== Section 3 ====
First round
7 | (United States) Sachia Vickery | 6 | 6
(Romania) Ilka Csöregi | 3 | 2
Q | (Austria) Barbara Haas | 6 | 6
Q | (United Kingdom) Eden Silva | 2 | 2
(Russia) Varvara Flink | 4 | 3
(Belgium) Elise Mertens | 6 | 6
(Brazil) Beatriz Haddad Maia | 6 | 3 | 1
11 | (Estonia) Anett Kontaveit | 4 | 6 | 6
16 | (Croatia) Ana Konjuh | 6 | 6
(Canada) Erin Routliffe | 4 | 3
(Ukraine) Oleksandra Korashvili | 6 | 3 | 6
Q | (United States) Catherine Harrison | 3 | 6 | 4
(Paraguay) Montserrat González | 7 | 6
(Chinese Taipei) Hsu Ching-wen | 5 | 2
(Russia) Olga Doroshina | 2 | 2
4 | (Kazakhstan) Anna Danilina | 6 | 6

Second round
7 | (United States) S Vickery | 6 | 6
Q | (Austria) B Haas | 3 | 0
(Belgium) E Mertens | 4 | 3
11 | (Estonia) A Kontaveit | 6 | 6
16 | (Croatia) A Konjuh | 7 | 6
(Ukraine) O Korashvili | 5 | 2
(Paraguay) M González | 6^{8} | 6 | 6
4 | (Kazakhstan) A Danilina | 7^{10} | 4 | 4

Third round
7 | (United States) S Vickery | 6^{6} | 4
11 | (Estonia) A Kontaveit | 7^{8} | 6
16 | (Croatia) A Konjuh | 6 | 6
(Paraguay) M González | 4 | 4

Quarterfinals
11 | (Estonia) A Kontaveit | 6 | 6
16 | (Croatia) A Konjuh | 0 | 4

==== Section 4 ====
First round
5 | (Canada) Eugenie Bouchard | 6 | 6
Q | (Russia) Anastasiya Komardina | 3 | 3
(Czech Republic) Barbora Krejčíková | 7 | 6
(Croatia) Iva Mekovec | 5 | 2
(Slovakia) Petra Uberalová | 4 | 6 | 4
Q | (Uzbekistan) Nigina Abduraimova | 6 | 4 | 6
WC | (United Kingdom) Katy Dunne | 6 | 6
10 | (United States) Chalena Scholl | 3 | 4
15 | (Bolivia) María Inés Deheza | 1 | 5
Q | (Turkey) İpek Soylu | 6 | 7
(Sweden) Ellen Allgurin | 6 | 6
(Argentina) Victoria Bosio | 3 | 2
WC | (Germany) Antonia Lottner | 6 | 6
WC | (United Kingdom) Georgina Sellyn | 2 | 1
(United States) Jennifer Brady | 4 | 6^{5}
2 | (Russia) Elizaveta Kulichkova | 6 | 7^{7}

Second round
5 | (Canada) E Bouchard | 6 | 6
(Czech Republic) B Krejčíková | 4 | 3
Q | (Uzbekistan) N Abduraimova | 6 | 7
WC | (United Kingdom) K Dunne | 2 | 5
Q | (Turkey) İ Soylu | 7 | 6
(Sweden) E Allgurin | 5 | 1
WC | (Germany) A Lottner | 5 | 6 | 6
2 | (Russia) E Kulichkova | 7 | 3 | 4

Third round
5 | (Canada) E Bouchard | 6 | 6
Q | (Uzbekistan) N Abduraimova | 1 | 4
Q | (Turkey) İ Soylu | 4 | 1
WC | (Germany) A Lottner | 6 | 6

Quarterfinals
5 | (Canada) E Bouchard | 4 | 6 | 6
WC | (Germany) A Lottner | 6 | 0 | 2
