= 2012 Wimbledon Championships – Boys' doubles =

Boys' doubles
- 2012 Wimbledon Championships

Final
- Champions: (Australia) Andrew Harris (Australia) Nick Kyrgios
- Runners-up: (Italy) Matteo Donati (Italy) Pietro Licciardi
- Score: 6–2, 6–4

Events
| Singles | men | women | | boys | girls |
| Doubles | men | women | mixed | boys | girls |
| WC Singles | men | women | quad |
| WC Doubles | men | women | quad |
| Legends | men | women | seniors |
- Wimbledon Championships

George Morgan and Mate Pavić were the defending champions but were no longer eligible to compete as Juniors.

Andrew Harris and Nick Kyrgios defeated Matteo Donati and Pietro Licciardi in the final, 6–2, 6–4 to win the boys' doubles tennis title at the 2012 Wimbledon Championships.

== Seeds ==
1. (Canada) Filip Peliwo / (Italy) Gianluigi Quinzi (quarterfinals)
2. (United Kingdom) Liam Broady / (United Kingdom) Joshua Ward-Hibbert (second round)
3. (Belgium) Julien Cagnina / (United States) Mitchell Krueger (first round, withdrew)
4. (Australia) Andrew Harris / (Australia) Nick Kyrgios (champions)
5. (Australia) Luke Saville / (Australia) Jordan Thompson (quarterfinals)
6. (Argentina) Juan Ignacio Galarza / (Argentina) Mateo Nicolás Martínez (semifinals)
7. (United Kingdom) Kyle Edmund / (Italy) Stefano Napolitano (first round)
8. (United States) Mackenzie McDonald / (United States) Spencer Papa (second round)

== Draw ==
Key

- Q = Qualifier
- WC = Wild card
- LL = Lucky loser
- Alt = Alternate
- ITF = ITF entry
- PR = Protected ranking
- SR = Special ranking
- SE = Special exempt
- JE = Junior exempt
- JR = Junior Accelerator Programme entrant
- CO = College Accelerator Programme entrant
- NG = Next Gen Accelerator Program entrant
- w/o = Walkover
- r = Retired
- d = Defaulted

=== Finals ===
Semifinals
6 | (Argentina) Juan Ignacio Galarza (Argentina) Mateo Nicolás Martínez | 2 | 1
4 | (Australia) Andrew Harris (Australia) Nick Kyrgios | 6 | 6
(Italy) Matteo Donati (Italy) Pietro Licciardi | 7^{7} | 7^{7}
WC | (United Kingdom) Evan Hoyt (South Africa) Wayne Montgomery | 6^{4} | 6^{5}

Final
4 | (Australia) Andrew Harris (Australia) Nick Kyrgios | 6 | 6
(Italy) Matteo Donati (Italy) Pietro Licciardi | 2 | 4

=== Top half ===
First round
1 | (Canada) Filip Peliwo (Italy) Gianluigi Quinzi | 6 | 6
WC | (United Kingdom) Peter Ashley (United Kingdom) Clay Crawford | 4 | 2
(Uzbekistan) Temur Ismailov (Greece) Markos Kalovelonis | 7^{8} | 7^{8}
(Spain) Pol Toledo Bagué (Sweden) Elias Ymer | 6^{6} | 6^{6}
(Australia) Jay Andrijic (Japan) Yoshihito Nishioka | 6 | 5 | [10]
(Netherlands) Max de Vroome (Portugal) Frederico Ferreira Silva | 4 | 7 | [5]
(Germany) Daniel Masur (Czech Republic) Václav Šafránek | 4 | 5
6 | (Argentina) Juan Ignacio Galarza (Argentina) Mateo Nicolás Martínez | 6 | 7
4 | (Australia) Andrew Harris (Australia) Nick Kyrgios | 6 | 7
(Croatia) Borna Ćorić (Serbia) Peđa Krstin | 1 | 5
(Brazil) Gabriel Friedrich (Peru) Daniel Santos | 6 | 3 | [10]
WC | (United Kingdom) Scott Clayton (United Kingdom) Jonny O'Mara | 4 | 6 | [7]
(United Kingdom) Luke Bambridge (Japan) Kaichi Uchida | 4 | 6 | [10]
(France) Mathias Bourgue (France) Laurent Lokoli | 6 | 4 | [8]
(Germany) Kevin Kaczynski (Germany) Maximilian Marterer | 6^{5} | 7 | [6]
8 | (United States) Mackenzie McDonald (United States) Spencer Papa | 7^{7} | 5 | [10]

Second round
1 | (Canada) F Peliwo (Italy) G Quinzi | 7 | 6
(Uzbekistan) T Ismailov (Greece) M Kalovelonis | 5 | 2
(Australia) J Andrijic (Japan) Y Nishioka | 4 | 2
6 | (Argentina) JI Galarza (Argentina) MN Martínez | 6 | 6
4 | (Australia) A Harris (Australia) N Kyrgios | 6 | 7^{7}
(Brazil) G Friedrich (Peru) D Santos | 2 | 6^{2}
(United Kingdom) L Bambridge (Japan) K Uchida | 6 | 6
8 | (United States) M McDonald (United States) S Papa | 3 | 4

Quarterfinals
1 | (Canada) F Peliwo (Italy) G Quinzi | 6^{2} | 6^{0}
6 | (Argentina) JI Galarza (Argentina) MN Martínez | 7^{7} | 7^{7}
4 | (Australia) A Harris (Australia) N Kyrgios | 7^{9} | 7
(United Kingdom) L Bambridge (Japan) K Uchida | 6^{7} | 5

Semifinals
6 | (Argentina) JI Galarza (Argentina) MN Martínez | 2 | 1
4 | (Australia) A Harris (Australia) N Kyrgios | 6 | 6

=== Bottom half ===
First round
5 | (Australia) Luke Saville (Australia) Jordan Thompson | 7 | 6
(Chile) Christian Garín (Mexico) Lucas Gómez | 5 | 1
(Israel) Bar Tzuf Botzer (United States) Connor Farren | 7^{9} | 6
WC | (United Kingdom) Tommy Bennett (United Kingdom) Joshua Sapwell | 6^{7} | 4
(Spain) Albert Alcaraz Ivorra (Spain) Eduard Esteve Lobato | 4 | 4
(Italy) Matteo Donati (Italy) Pietro Licciardi | 6 | 6
(United States) Stefan Kozlov (United States) Thai-Son Kwiatkowski
3 | (Belgium) Julien Cagnina (United States) Mitchell Krueger | w/o
7 | (United Kingdom) Kyle Edmund (Italy) Stefano Napolitano | 7 | 4 | [7]
WC | (United Kingdom) Evan Hoyt (South Africa) Wayne Montgomery | 5 | 6 | [10]
(Russia) Anton Desyatnik (Ukraine) Marat Deviatiarov | 7 | 6
(Egypt) Karim Hossam (Burundi) Hassan Ndayshimiye | 5 | 3
(Finland) Herkko Pöllänen (Romania) Ștefan Vinți | 4 | 1
(Sweden) Filip Bergevi (Denmark) Mikael Torpegaard | 6 | 6
(United States) Alexios Halebian (United States) Noah Rubin | 6^{7} | 6 | [8]
2 | (United Kingdom) Liam Broady (United Kingdom) Joshua Ward-Hibbert | 7^{9} | 4 | [10]

Second round
5 | (Australia) L Saville (Australia) J Thompson | 6 | 6
(Israel) BT Botzer (United States) C Farren | 0 | 3
(Italy) M Donati (Italy) P Licciardi | 7^{7} | 6
(United States) S Kozlov (United States) T-S Kwiatkowski | 6^{4} | 3
WC | (United Kingdom) E Hoyt (South Africa) W Montgomery | 5 | 6 | [10]
(Russia) A Desyatnik (Ukraine) M Deviatiarov | 7 | 2 | [4]
(Sweden) F Bergevi (Denmark) M Torpegaard | 7 | 4 | [10]
2 | (United Kingdom) L Broady (United Kingdom) J W-Hibbert | 5 | 6 | [5]

Quarterfinals
5 | (Australia) L Saville (Australia) J Thompson | 5 | 2
(Italy) M Donati (Italy) P Licciardi | 7 | 6
WC | (United Kingdom) E Hoyt (South Africa) W Montgomery | 4 | 6 | [10]
(Sweden) F Bergevi (Denmark) M Torpegaard | 6 | 4 | [7]

Semifinals
(Italy) M Donati (Italy) P Licciardi | 7^{7} | 7^{7}
WC | (United Kingdom) E Hoyt (South Africa) W Montgomery | 6^{4} | 6^{5}
