= 2012 Wimbledon Championships – Wheelchair men's doubles =

Wheelchair men's doubles
- 2012 Wimbledon Championships

Final
- Champions: (Netherlands) Tom Egberink (France) Michaël Jérémiasz
- Runners-up: (Netherlands) Robin Ammerlaan (Netherlands) Ronald Vink
- Score: 6–4, 6–2

Events
Singles	men	women		boys	girls
Doubles	men	women	mixed	boys	girls
WC Singles	men	women	quad
WC Doubles	men	women	quad
Legends	men	women	seniors
← 2011 ·	Wimbledon Championships	· 2013 →

Tom Egberink and Michaël Jérémiasz defeated the defending champion Ronald Vink and his partner Robin Ammerlaan in the final, 6–4, 6–2 to win the gentlemen's doubles wheelchair tennis title at the 2012 Wimbledon Championships.

Maikel Scheffers and Vink were the reigning champions, but Scheffers did not participate.

== Seeds ==
1. (Netherlands) Robin Ammerlaan / (Netherlands) Ronald Vink (final)
2. (France) Stéphane Houdet / (France) Nicolas Peifer (semifinals, third place)

== Draw ==
=== Key ===
- Q = Qualifier
- WC = Wild card
- LL = Lucky loser
- Alt = Alternate
- ITF = ITF entry
- PR = Protected ranking
- SR = Special ranking
- SE = Special exempt
- JE = Junior exempt
- JR = Junior Accelerator Programme entrant
- CO = College Accelerator Programme entrant
- NG = Next Gen Accelerator Program entrant
- w/o = Walkover
- r = Retired
- d = Defaulted

=== Finals ===
Semifinals
1	(Netherlands) Robin Ammerlaan (Netherlands) Ronald Vink	6	6
(United Kingdom) Marc McCarroll (United Kingdom) Brett Reid	2	2
(Netherlands) Tom Egberink (France) Michaël Jeremiasz	2	7^{7}	7
2	(France) Stéphane Houdet (France) Nicolas Peifer	6	6^{5}	5

Final
1	(Netherlands) Robin Ammerlaan (Netherlands) Ronald Vink	4	2
(Netherlands) Tom Egberink (France) Michaël Jeremiasz	6	6
Third place
(United Kingdom) Marc McCarroll (United Kingdom) Brett Reid	1	6^{1}
2	(France) Stéphane Houdet (France) Nicolas Peifer	6	7^{7}
