= 2012 Wimbledon Championships – Boys' singles =

Boys' singles
- 2012 Wimbledon Championships

Final
- Champion: (Canada) Filip Peliwo
- Runner-up: (Australia) Luke Saville
- Score: 7–5, 6–4

Details
- Draw: 64 (8Q / 8WC)
- Seeds: 16

Events
| Singles | men | women | | boys | girls |
| Doubles | men | women | mixed | boys | girls |
| WC Singles | men | women | quad |
| WC Doubles | men | women | quad |
| Legends | men | women | seniors |
- Wimbledon Championships

Filip Peliwo defeated the defending champion Luke Saville in the final, 7–5, 6–4 to win the boys' singles tennis title at the 2012 Wimbledon Championships. He saved five match points in the semifinals against Mitchell Krueger.

== Seeds ==
1. (Australia) Luke Saville (final)
2. (Belgium) Kimmer Coppejans (quarterfinals)
3. (Italy) Gianluigi Quinzi (semifinals)
4. (Canada) Filip Peliwo (champion)
5. (United Kingdom) Liam Broady (third round)
6. (Serbia) Nikola Milojević (quarterfinals, retired)
7. (Japan) Kaichi Uchida (third round)
8. (United States) Mitchell Krueger (semifinals)
9. (Australia) Andrew Harris (first round)
10. (Argentina) Mateo Nicolás Martínez (second round)
11. (Italy) Stefano Napolitano (third round)
12. (United Kingdom) Joshua Ward-Hibbert (first round, retired)
13. (Belgium) Julien Cagnina (third round, retired)
14. (United States) Noah Rubin (first round)
15. (United States) Mackenzie McDonald (first round)
16. (Portugal) Frederico Ferreira Silva (third round)

Click on the seed number of a player to go to their draw section.

== Draw ==
Key

- Q = Qualifier
- WC = Wild card
- LL = Lucky loser
- Alt = Alternate
- ITF = ITF entry
- PR = Protected ranking
- SR = Special ranking
- SE = Special exempt
- JE = Junior exempt
- JR = Junior Accelerator Programme entrant
- CO = College Accelerator Programme entrant
- NG = Next Gen Accelerator Program entrant
- w/o = Walkover
- r = Retired
- d = Defaulted

=== Finals ===
Quarterfinals
1 | (Australia) Luke Saville | 7 | 5
6 | (Serbia) Nikola Milojević | 5 | 4^{r}
3 | (Italy) Gianluigi Quinzi | 6 | 6
(Australia) Nick Kyrgios | 3 | 1
WC | (France) Enzo Couacaud | 4 | 6 | 3
4 | (Canada) Filip Peliwo | 6 | 1 | 6
8 | (United States) Mitchell Krueger | 6 | 7^{7}
2 | (Belgium) Kimmer Coppejans | 2 | 6^{5}

Semifinals
1 | (Australia) Luke Saville | 6 | 6
3 | (Italy) Gianluigi Quinzi | 3 | 4
4 | (Canada) Filip Peliwo | 5 | 7^{7} | 6
8 | (United States) Mitchell Krueger | 7 | 6^{3} | 3

Final
1 | (Australia) Luke Saville | 5 | 4
4 | (Canada) Filip Peliwo | 7 | 6

=== Top half ===
==== Section 1 ====
First round
1 | (Australia) Luke Saville | 6 | 6
(France) Laurent Lokoli | 1 | 4
(Peru) Daniel Santos | 0 | 2
Q | (Romania) Ștefan Vinți | 6 | 6
(United Kingdom) Luke Bambridge | 6 | 6
(Czech Republic) Václav Šafránek | 1 | 4
Q | (Germany) Maximilian Marterer | 6 | 6
14 | (United States) Noah Rubin | 4 | 4
12 | (United Kingdom) Joshua Ward-Hibbert | 0 | 0^{r}
Q | (Sweden) Elias Ymer | 6 | 2
Q | (United States) Thai-Son Kwiatkowski | 6 | 3 | 6
(Netherlands) Max de Vroome | 4 | 6 | 4
(Denmark) Mikael Torpegaard | 4 | 6 | 2
(Italy) Matteo Donati | 6 | 4 | 6
(Brazil) Gabriel Friedrich | 7 | 4 | 4
6 | (Serbia) Nikola Milojević | 5 | 6 | 6

Second round
1 | (Australia) L Saville | 6 | 6
Q | (Romania) Ș Vinți | 4 | 2
(United Kingdom) L Bambridge | 6 | 6
Q | (Germany) M Marterer | 3 | 4
Q | (Sweden) E Ymer | 4 | 2
Q | (United States) T-S Kwiatkowski | 6 | 6
(Italy) M Donati | 5 | 4
6 | (Serbia) N Milojević | 7 | 6

Third round
1 | (Australia) L Saville | 7^{7} | 6
(United Kingdom) L Bambridge | 6^{4} | 4
Q | (United States) T-S Kwiatkowski | 6 | 3 | 2
6 | (Serbia) N Milojević | 4 | 6 | 6

Quarterfinals
1 | (Australia) L Saville | 7 | 5
6 | (Serbia) N Milojević | 5 | 4^{r}

==== Section 2 ====
First round
3 | (Italy) Gianluigi Quinzi | 6 | 6
Q | (Burundi) Hassan Ndayshimiye | 3 | 1
(Chile) Christian Garín | 1 | 7 | 6
WC | (United Kingdom) Evan Hoyt | 6 | 5 | 0
(France) Mathias Bourgue | 6^{4} | 6 | 14
(United States) Alexios Halebian | 7^{7} | 4 | 12
(United Kingdom) Jordan Hughes | 3 | 6 | 4
13 | (Belgium) Julien Cagnina | 6 | 4 | 6
10 | (Argentina) Mateo Nicolás Martínez | 6 | 6
(United States) Connor Farren | 2 | 2
(Greece) Markos Kalovelonis | 2 | 2
(Australia) Nick Kyrgios | 6 | 6
WC | (United Kingdom) Peter Ashley | 4 | 2
Q | (Spain) Pol Toledo Bagué | 6 | 6
(Mexico) Lucas Gómez | 1 | 2
7 | (Japan) Kaichi Uchida | 6 | 6

Second round
3 | (Italy) G Quinzi | 6 | 6^{9} | 8
(Chile) C Garín | 1 | 7^{11} | 6
(France) M Bourgue | 4 | 7^{7} | 3
13 | (Belgium) J Cagnina | 6 | 6^{2} | 6
10 | (Argentina) MN Martínez | 6^{4} | 4
(Australia) N Kyrgios | 7^{7} | 6
Q | (Spain) P Toledo Bagué | 4 | 1
7 | (Japan) K Uchida | 6 | 6

Third round
3 | (Italy) G Quinzi | 6 | 3
13 | (Belgium) J Cagnina | 1 | 1^{r}
(Australia) N Kyrgios | 7 | 6
7 | (Japan) K Uchida | 5 | 2

Quarterfinals
3 | (Italy) G Quinzi | 6 | 6
(Australia) N Kyrgios | 3 | 1

=== Bottom half ===
==== Section 3 ====
First round
5 | (United Kingdom) Liam Broady | 6 | 7^{7}
(Sweden) Filip Bergevi | 3 | 6^{2}
Q | (United States) Stefan Kozlov | 5 | 6 | 6
(Germany) Daniel Masur | 7 | 2 | 1
WC | (United Kingdom) Myles Orton | 6 | 3 | 6
(Egypt) Karim Hossam | 1 | 6 | 8
WC | (France) Enzo Couacaud | 6 | 3 | 6
9 | (Australia) Andrew Harris | 1 | 6 | 4
15 | (United States) Mackenzie McDonald | 4 | 6 | 4
(Italy) Pietro Licciardi | 6 | 2 | 6
(South Africa) Wayne Montgomery | 6^{7} | 5
(Finland) Herkko Pöllänen | 7^{9} | 7
WC | (United Kingdom) Clay Crawford | 4 | 3
(Japan) Yoshihito Nishioka | 6 | 6
(Spain) Albert Alcaraz Ivorra | 6^{5} | 3
4 | (Canada) Filip Peliwo | 7^{7} | 6

Second round
5 | (United Kingdom) L Broady | 6^{3} | 6 | 6
Q | (United States) S Kozlov | 7^{7} | 0 | 4
(Egypt) K Hossam | 3 | 4
WC | (France) E Couacaud | 6 | 6
(Italy) P Licciardi | 7^{7} | 6
(Finland) H Pöllänen | 6^{4} | 2
(Japan) Y Nishioka | 2 | 1
4 | (Canada) F Peliwo | 6 | 6

Third round
5 | (United Kingdom) L Broady | 6^{4} | 3
WC | (France) E Couacaud | 7^{7} | 6
(Italy) P Licciardi | 2 | 2
4 | (Canada) F Peliwo | 6 | 6

Quarterfinals
WC | (France) E Couacaud | 4 | 6 | 3
4 | (Canada) F Peliwo | 6 | 1 | 6

==== Section 4 ====
First round
8 | (United States) Mitchell Krueger | 4 | 7^{8} | 10
(United Kingdom) Kyle Edmund | 6 | 6^{6} | 8
(Argentina) Juan Ignacio Galarza | 3 | 0
(Croatia) Borna Ćorić | 6 | 6
(Russia) Anton Desyatnik | 7^{7} | 6
WC | (United Kingdom) Scott Clayton | 6^{1} | 4
(France) Maxime Hamou | 1 | 1
11 | (Italy) Stefano Napolitano | 6 | 6
16 | (Portugal) Frederico Ferreira Silva | 6 | 6
Q | (Czech Republic) Marek Routa | 4 | 4
(Australia) Jordan Thompson | 6 | 6
WC | (United Kingdom) Jonny O'Mara | 2 | 2
(Serbia) Peđa Krstin | 7 | 6
(United States) Spencer Papa | 5 | 2
(Spain) Eduard Esteve Lobato | 4 | 3
2 | (Belgium) Kimmer Coppejans | 6 | 6

Second round
8 | (United States) M Krueger | 6 | 7^{10}
(Croatia) B Ćorić | 3 | 6^{8}
(Russia) A Desyatnik | 7^{7} | 5 | 3
11 | (Italy) S Napolitano | 6^{4} | 7 | 6
16 | (Portugal) FF Silva | 6 | 6
(Australia) J Thompson | 1 | 2
(Serbia) P Krstin | 3 | 6^{3}
2 | (Belgium) K Coppejans | 6 | 7^{7}

Third round
8 | (United States) M Krueger | 7^{9} | 6
11 | (Italy) S Napolitano | 6^{7} | 4
16 | (Portugal) FF Silva | 1 | 7^{7} | 4
2 | (Belgium) K Coppejans | 6 | 6^{4} | 6

Quarterfinals
8 | (United States) M Krueger | 6 | 7^{7}
2 | (Belgium) K Coppejans | 2 | 6^{5}
