= 2012 Wimbledon Championships – Mixed doubles =

Mixed doubles
- 2012 Wimbledon Championships

Final
- Champions: (United States) Mike Bryan (United States) Lisa Raymond
- Runners-up: (India) Leander Paes (Russia) Elena Vesnina
- Score: 6–3, 5–7, 6–4

Details
- Draw: 48 (4 WC )
- Seeds: 16

Events
Singles	men	women		boys	girls
Doubles	men	women	mixed	boys	girls
WC Singles	men	women	quad
WC Doubles	men	women	quad
Legends	men	women	seniors
← 2011 ·	Wimbledon Championships	· 2013 →

Jürgen Melzer and Iveta Benešová were the defending champions, but after receiving a first-round bye, lost in the second round to Dominic Inglot and Laura Robson.

Mike Bryan and Lisa Raymond defeated Leander Paes and Elena Vesnina in the final, 6–3, 5–7, 6–4 to win the mixed doubles tennis title at the 2012 Wimbledon Championships.

== Seeds ==
All seeds received a bye into the second round.

1. (United States) Bob Bryan / (United States) Liezel Huber (semifinals)
2. (United States) Mike Bryan / (United States) Lisa Raymond (champions)
3. (Serbia) Nenad Zimonjić / (Slovenia) Katarina Srebotnik (semifinals)
4. (India) Leander Paes / (Russia) Elena Vesnina (final)
5. (India) Mahesh Bhupathi / (India) Sania Mirza (second round)
6. (Italy) Daniele Bracciali / (Italy) Roberta Vinci (third round)
7. (Pakistan) Aisam-ul-Haq Qureshi / (Czech Republic) Andrea Hlaváčková (second round)
8. (Canada) Daniel Nestor / (Germany) Julia Görges (quarterfinals)
9. (Poland) Mariusz Fyrstenberg / (United States) Abigail Spears (second round)
10. (India) Rohan Bopanna / (China) Zheng Jie (quarterfinals)
11. (Czech Republic) František Čermák / (Czech Republic) Lucie Hradecká (withdrew)
12. (Austria) Jürgen Melzer / (Czech Republic) Iveta Benešová (second round)
13. (Italy) Fabio Fognini / (Italy) Sara Errani (second round)
14. (Spain) David Marrero / (Spain) Nuria Llagostera Vives (second round)
15. (Israel) Andy Ram / (Czech Republic) Květa Peschke (third round)
16. (Austria) Alexander Peya / (Germany) Anna-Lena Grönefeld (third round)

Click on the seed number of a player to go to their draw section.

== Draw ==
=== Key ===
- Q = Qualifier
- WC = Wild card
- LL = Lucky loser
- Alt = Alternate
- SE = Special exempt
- PR = Protected ranking
- ITF = ITF entry
- JE = Junior exempt
- w/o = Walkover
- r = Retired
- d = Defaulted
- SR = Special ranking

=== Finals ===
Quarterfinals
1	(United States) Bob Bryan (United States) Liezel Huber	7	6
8	(Canada) Daniel Nestor (Germany) Julia Görges	5	1
4	(India) Leander Paes (Russia) Elena Vesnina	6	6
(Australia) Paul Hanley (Russia) Alla Kudryavtseva	2	2
(United Kingdom) Colin Fleming (Chinese Taipei) Hsieh Su-wei	6^{3}	3
3	(Serbia) Nenad Zimonjić (Slovenia) Katarina Srebotnik	7^{7}	6
10	(India) Rohan Bopanna (China) Zheng Jie	2	5
2	(United States) Mike Bryan (United States) Lisa Raymond	6	7

Semifinals
1	(United States) Bob Bryan (United States) Liezel Huber	5	6	3
4	(India) Leander Paes (Russia) Elena Vesnina	7	3	6
3	(Serbia) Nenad Zimonjić (Slovenia) Katarina Srebotnik	3	4
2	(United States) Mike Bryan (United States) Lisa Raymond	6	6

Final
4	(India) Leander Paes (Russia) Elena Vesnina	3	7	4
2	(United States) Mike Bryan (United States) Lisa Raymond	6	5	6

=== Top half ===
==== Section 1 ====
First round
Alt	(Sweden) J Brunström (Slovenia) A Klepač	7^{7}	6^{3}	6
(Netherlands) J-J Rojer (Poland) K Jans-Ignacik	6^{3}	7^{7}	4
(Romania) H Tecău (United States) B Mattek-Sands	5	1
Alt	(Israel) J Erlich (Israel) S Pe'er	7	6
(Austria) J Knowle (Austria) T Paszek	6	6
(Spain) M López (Slovakia) J Husárová	1	2
(Russia) M Elgin (Kazakhstan) G Voskoboeva	6	7
(Mexico) S González (China) S Zhang	4	5

Second round
1	(United States) B Bryan (United States) L Huber	4	6	6
Alt	(Sweden) J Brunström (Slovenia) A Klepač	6	4	4
Alt	(Israel) J Erlich (Israel) S Pe'er	3	6	4
15	(Israel) A Ram (Czech Republic) K Peschke	6	3	6
Alt	(United States) J Cerretani (Croatia) P Martić	w/o
(Austria) J Knowle (Austria) T Paszek
(Russia) M Elgin (Kazakhstan) G Voskoboeva	6	3	4
8	(Canada) D Nestor (Germany) J Görges	4	6	6

Third round
1	(United States) B Bryan (United States) L Huber	3	6	6
15	(Israel) A Ram (Czech Republic) K Peschke	6	2	1
(Austria) J Knowle (Austria) T Paszek	5	6	2
8	(Canada) D Nestor (Germany) J Görges	7	4	6

Quarterfinals
1	(United States) B Bryan (United States) L Huber	7	6
8	(Canada) D Nestor (Germany) J Görges	5	1

==== Section 2 ====
First round
Alt	(Australia) A Fisher (Germany) M Barthel	6	7
(Belgium) D Norman (Poland) A Rosolska	2	5
(Belarus) M Mirnyi (Belarus) V Azarenka	7^{13}	6
(Sweden) R Lindstedt (Sweden) S Arvidsson	6^{11}	4
(Kazakhstan) M Kukushkin (Kazakhstan) Y Shvedova	7	7^{7}
(South Africa) K Anderson (South Africa) C Scheepers	5	6^{2}
(Australia) P Hanley (Russia) A Kudryavtseva	6	6
WC	(United Kingdom) J Marray (United Kingdom) A Keothavong	4	4

Second round
4	(India) L Paes (Russia) E Vesnina	6	6
Alt	(Australia) A Fisher (Germany) M Barthel	3	3
(Belarus) M Mirnyi (Belarus) V Azarenka	6	6
13	(Italy) F Fognini (Italy) S Errani	3	2
9	(Poland) M Fyrstenberg (United States) A Spears	3	5
(Kazakhstan) M Kukushkin (Kazakhstan) Y Shvedova	6	7
(Australia) P Hanley (Russia) A Kudryavtseva	6	6
5	(India) M Bhupathi (India) S Mirza	3	1

Third round
4	(India) L Paes (Russia) E Vesnina	7^{7}	6
(Belarus) M Mirnyi (Belarus) V Azarenka	6^{3}	3
(Kazakhstan) M Kukushkin (Kazakhstan) Y Shvedova	6^{6}	6	5
(Australia) P Hanley (Russia) A Kudryavtseva	7^{8}	3	7

Quarterfinals
4	(India) L Paes (Russia) E Vesnina	6	6
(Australia) P Hanley (Russia) A Kudryavtseva	2	2

=== Bottom half ===
==== Section 3 ====
First round
(United Kingdom) C Fleming (Chinese Taipei) S-w Hsieh	4	6	6
(Brazil) A Sá (Australia) A Rodionova	6	3	4
WC	(United Kingdom) D Inglot (United Kingdom) L Robson	7^{7}	6
(United States) S Lipsky (South Africa) N Grandin	6^{2}	4
WC	(United Kingdom) K Skupski (United Kingdom) M South	7^{7}	7^{8}
(United States) E Butorac (United States) V Lepchenko	6^{5}	6^{6}
(Slovakia) F Polášek (Slovakia) D Hantuchová	4	3
WC	(United Kingdom) R Hutchins (United Kingdom) H Watson	6	6

Second round
7	(Pakistan) A-u-H Qureshi (Czech Republic) A Hlaváčková	3	7^{7}	1
(United Kingdom) C Fleming (Chinese Taipei) S-w Hsieh	6	6^{5}	6
WC	(United Kingdom) D Inglot (United Kingdom) L Robson	6	3	6
12	(Austria) J Melzer (Czech Republic) I Benešová	3	6	1
14	(Spain) D Marrero (Spain) N Llagostera Vives	4	5
WC	(United Kingdom) K Skupski (United Kingdom) M South	6	7
WC	(United Kingdom) R Hutchins (United Kingdom) H Watson	7	4	4
3	(Serbia) N Zimonjić (Slovenia) K Srebotnik	5	6	6

Third round
(United Kingdom) C Fleming (Chinese Taipei) S-w Hsieh	7^{7}	7^{7}
WC	(United Kingdom) D Inglot (United Kingdom) L Robson	6^{3}	6^{3}
WC	(United Kingdom) K Skupski (United Kingdom) M South	4	7^{7}	7
3	(Serbia) N Zimonjić (Slovenia) K Srebotnik	6	6^{5}	9

Quarterfinals
(United Kingdom) C Fleming (Chinese Taipei) S-w Hsieh	6^{3}	3
3	(Serbia) N Zimonjić (Slovenia) K Srebotnik	7^{7}	6

==== Section 4 ====
First round
(Germany) F Moser (Czech Republic) V Uhlířová	2	3
(Germany) P Petzschner (Germany) A Kerber	6	6
(Brazil) M Melo (Russia) V Zvonareva	6	7
(Colombia) JS Cabal (Russia) V Dushevina	3	5
(Philippines) T Huey (United States) R Kops-Jones	7^{15}	4	4
(Brazil) B Soares (Australia) J Gajdošová	6^{13}	6	6
(Colombia) R Farah (Romania) M Niculescu	6	2	1
(The Bahamas) M Knowles (Russia) E Makarova	4	6	6

Second round
6	(Italy) D Bracciali (Italy) R Vinci	6	2	6
(Germany) P Petzschner (Germany) A Kerber	3	6	4
(Brazil) M Melo (Russia) V Zvonareva	w/o
10	(India) R Bopanna (China) J Zheng
16	(Austria) A Peya (Germany) A-L Grönefeld	6	5	6
(Brazil) B Soares (Australia) J Gajdošová	4	7	4
(The Bahamas) M Knowles (Russia) E Makarova	6^{3}	4
2	(United States) M Bryan (United States) L Raymond	7^{7}	6

Third round
6	(Italy) D Bracciali (Italy) R Vinci	0	3
10	(India) R Bopanna (China) J Zheng	6	6
16	(Austria) A Peya (Germany) A-L Grönefeld	3	5
2	(United States) M Bryan (United States) L Raymond	6	7

Quarterfinals
10	(India) R Bopanna (China) J Zheng	2	5
2	(United States) M Bryan (United States) L Raymond	6	7
