= 2012 Wimbledon Championships – Wheelchair women's doubles =

Wheelchair women's doubles
- 2012 Wimbledon Championships

Final
- Champions: (Netherlands) Jiske Griffioen (Netherlands) Aniek van Koot
- Runners-up: (United Kingdom) Lucy Shuker (United Kingdom) Jordanne Whiley
- Score: 6–1, 6–2

Events
Singles	men	women		boys	girls
Doubles	men	women	mixed	boys	girls
WC Singles	men	women	quad
WC Doubles	men	women	quad
Legends	men	women	seniors
← 2011 ·	Wimbledon Championships	· 2013 →

Jiske Griffioen and Aniek van Koot defeated Lucy Shuker and Jordanne Whiley in the final, 6–1, 6–2 to win the ladies' doubles wheelchair tennis title at the 2012 Wimbledon Championships. Griffioen completed the career Grand Slam with the win.

Esther Vergeer and Sharon Walraven were the two-time defending champions, but did not play together. Vergeer partnered Marjolein Buis and Walraven partnered Annick Sevenans, but both pairs were defeated in the semifinals.

== Seeds ==
1. (Netherlands) Marjolein Buis / (Netherlands) Esther Vergeer (semifinals, third place)
2. (Belgium) Annick Sevenans / (Netherlands) Sharon Walraven (semifinals, fourth place)

== Draw ==
=== Key ===
- Q = Qualifier
- WC = Wild card
- LL = Lucky loser
- Alt = Alternate
- ITF = ITF entry
- PR = Protected ranking
- SR = Special ranking
- SE = Special exempt
- JE = Junior exempt
- JR = Junior Accelerator Programme entrant
- CO = College Accelerator Programme entrant
- NG = Next Gen Accelerator Program entrant
- w/o = Walkover
- r = Retired
- d = Defaulted

=== Finals ===
Semifinals
1	(Netherlands) Marjolein Buis (Netherlands) Esther Vergeer	6	3	4
(Netherlands) Jiske Griffioen (Netherlands) Aniek van Koot	3	6	6
(United Kingdom) Lucy Shuker (United Kingdom) Jordanne Whiley	7^{7}	6
2	(Belgium) Annick Sevenans (Netherlands) Sharon Walraven	6^{5}	3

Final
(Netherlands) Jiske Griffioen (Netherlands) Aniek van Koot	6	6
(United Kingdom) Lucy Shuker (United Kingdom) Jordanne Whiley	1	2
Third place
1	(Netherlands) Marjolein Buis (Netherlands) Esther Vergeer	6	6
2	(Belgium) Annick Sevenans (Netherlands) Sharon Walraven	1	1
