= 2012 Wimbledon Championships – Gentlemen's invitation doubles =

Gentlemen's invitation doubles
- 2012 Wimbledon Championships

Final
- Champions: (United Kingdom) Greg Rusedski (France) Fabrice Santoro
- Runners-up: (Sweden) Thomas Enqvist (Australia) Mark Philippoussis
- Score: 6–7^{(3–7)}, 6–4, [11–9]

Events
Singles	men	women		boys	girls
Doubles	men	women	mixed	boys	girls
WC Singles	men	women	quad
WC Doubles	men	women	quad
Legends	men	women	seniors
← 2011 ·	Wimbledon Championships	· 2013 →

Jacco Eltingh and Paul Haarhuis were the defending champions but were eliminated in the round robin.

Greg Rusedski and Fabrice Santoro defeated Thomas Enqvist and Mark Philippoussis in the final, 6–7^{(3–7)}, 6–4, [11–9] to win the gentlemen's invitation doubles tennis title at the 2012 Wimbledon Championships.

== Draw ==
=== Key ===
- Q = Qualifier
- WC = Wild card
- LL = Lucky loser
- Alt = Alternate
- ITF = ITF entry
- PR = Protected ranking
- SR = Special ranking
- SE = Special exempt
- JE = Junior exempt
- JR = Junior Accelerator Programme entrant
- CO = College Accelerator Programme entrant
- NG = Next Gen Accelerator Program entrant
- w/o = Walkover
- r = Retired
- d = Defaulted

=== Final ===
Final
(United Kingdom) Greg Rusedski (France) Fabrice Santoro	6^{3}	6	[11]
(Sweden) Thomas Enqvist (Australia) Mark Philippoussis	7^{7}	4	[9]

=== Group A ===
	(Netherlands) Eltingh (Netherlands) Haarhuis	(United States) Gimelstob (United States) Martin	(Croatia) Ivanišević (France) Pioline	(United Kingdom) Rusedski (France) Santoro	RR; W–L	Set; W–L	Game; W–L	Standings
(Netherlands) Jacco Eltingh (Netherlands) Paul Haarhuis		6–4, 6–4	6–2, 6–3	5–7, 6–2, [7–10]	2–1	5–2	36–23	2
(United States) Justin Gimelstob (United States) Todd Martin	4–6, 4–6		3–6, 6–7^{(4–7)}	5–7, 4–6	0–3	0–6	26–38	4
(Croatia) Goran Ivanišević (France) Cédric Pioline	2–6, 3–6	6–3, 7–6^{(7–4)}		3–6, 4–6	1–2	2–4	25–33	3
(United Kingdom) Greg Rusedski (France) Fabrice Santoro	7–5, 2–6, [10–7]	7–5, 6–4	6–3, 6–4		3–0	6–1	35–28	1

Standings are determined by: 1. number of wins; 2. number of matches; 3. in two-players-ties, head-to-head records; 4. in three-players-ties, percentage of sets won, or of games won; 5. steering-committee decision.

=== Group B ===
	(Sweden) Björkman (Australia) Woodbridge	(Sweden) Enqvist (Australia) Philippoussis	(South Africa) Ferreira (United Kingdom) Wilkinson	(Netherlands) Krajicek (United Kingdom) Petchey	RR; W–L	Set; W–L	Game; W–L	Standings
(Sweden) Jonas Björkman (Australia) Todd Woodbridge		5–7, 2–6	4–6, 6–1, [10–12]	6–2, 4–6, [10–8]	1–2	3–5	29–28	2
(Sweden) Thomas Enqvist (Australia) Mark Philippoussis	7–5, 6–2		6–3, 6–4	6–3, 6–4	3–0	6–0	37–21	1
(South Africa) Wayne Ferreira (United Kingdom) Chris Wilkinson	6–4, 1–6, [12–10]	3–6, 4–6		6–4, 1–6, [6–10]	1–2	3–5	22–33	4
(Netherlands) Richard Krajicek (United Kingdom) Mark Petchey	2–6, 6–4, [8–10]	3–6, 4–6	4–6, 6–1, [10–6]		1–2	3–5	26–30	3

Standings are determined by: 1. number of wins; 2. number of matches; 3. in two-players-ties, head-to-head records; 4. in three-players-ties, percentage of sets won, or of games won; 5. steering-committee decision.
