= 2012 Wimbledon Championships – Men's singles =

Tennis tournament held in 2012

Men's singles
- 2012 Wimbledon Championships

Final
- Champion: (Switzerland) Roger Federer
- Runner-up: (United Kingdom) Andy Murray
- Score: 4–6, 7–5, 6–3, 6–4

Details
- Draw: 128 (16Q / 8WC)
- Seeds: 32

Events
Singles	men	women		boys	girls
Doubles	men	women	mixed	boys	girls
WC Singles	men	women	quad
WC Doubles	men	women	quad
Legends	men	women	seniors
← 2011 ·	Wimbledon Championships	· 2013 →

Roger Federer defeated Andy Murray in the final, 4–6, 7–5, 6–3, 6–4 to win the gentlemen's singles tennis title at the 2012 Wimbledon Championships. It was his seventh Wimbledon title and record-extending 17th major title overall. With the win, Federer regained the world No. 1 singles ranking. He equalled William Renshaw and Pete Sampras' all-time record of seven Wimbledon titles, as well as Sampras' record of 286 weeks as world No. 1. This was the first major final since the 2010 Australian Open not to feature Novak Djokovic or Rafael Nadal, a span of nine events (incidentally, the 2010 Australian Open final also pitted Federer against Murray). It was Murray's fourth runner-up finish in a major final.

Djokovic was the defending champion, but lost in the semifinals to Federer.

Murray was the first British man to reach the final since Bunny Austin in 1938. The championships was also notable for one of the biggest upsets in recent years, when world No. 100 Lukáš Rosol beat world No. 2 and two-time champion Nadal in the second round, ending Nadal's streak of 11 major quarterfinals and of five (non-consecutive) Wimbledon finals. The loss also marked the end of Nadal's season, as he did not play tennis again until February 2013.

This marked the last major appearances for 2002 finalist and former world No. 3 David Nalbandian, 2003 French Open champion and former world No. 1 Juan Carlos Ferrero, and the last Wimbledon appearance for three-time finalist, 2003 US Open champion, and former world No. 1 Andy Roddick.

== Seeds ==
1. (Serbia) Novak Djokovic (semifinals)
2. (Spain) Rafael Nadal (second round)
3. (Switzerland) Roger Federer (champion)
4. (United Kingdom) Andy Murray (final)
5. (France) Jo-Wilfried Tsonga (semifinals)
6. (Czech Republic) Tomáš Berdych (first round)
7. (Spain) David Ferrer (quarterfinals)
8. (Serbia) Janko Tipsarević (third round)
9. (Argentina) Juan Martín del Potro (fourth round)
10. (United States) Mardy Fish (fourth round)
11. (United States) John Isner (first round)
12. (Spain) Nicolás Almagro (third round)
13. (France) Gilles Simon (second round)
14. (Spain) Feliciano López (first round)
15. (Argentina) Juan Mónaco (third round)
16. (Croatia) Marin Čilić (fourth round)
17. (Spain) Fernando Verdasco (third round)
18. (France) Richard Gasquet (fourth round)
19. (Japan) Kei Nishikori (third round)
20. (Australia) Bernard Tomic (first round)
21. (Canada) Milos Raonic (second round)
22. (Ukraine) Alexandr Dolgopolov (second round)
23. (Italy) Andreas Seppi (first round)
24. (Spain) Marcel Granollers (first round)
25. (Switzerland) Stan Wawrinka (first round)
26. (Russia) Mikhail Youzhny (quarterfinals)
27. (Germany) Philipp Kohlschreiber (quarterfinals)
28. (Czech Republic) Radek Štěpánek (third round)
29. (France) Julien Benneteau (third round)
30. (United States) Andy Roddick (third round)
31. (Germany) Florian Mayer (quarterfinals)
32. (South Africa) Kevin Anderson (first round)

Click on the seed number of a player to go to their draw section.

== Draw ==
Key

- Q = Qualifier
- WC = Wild card
- LL = Lucky loser
- Alt = Alternate
- ITF = ITF entry
- PR = Protected ranking
- SR = Special ranking
- SE = Special exempt
- JE = Junior exempt
- JR = Junior Accelerator Programme entrant
- CO = College Accelerator Programme entrant
- NG = Next Gen Accelerator Program entrant
- w/o = Walkover
- r = Retired
- d = Defaulted

=== Finals ===
Quarterfinals
1	(Serbia) Novak Djokovic	6	6	6
31	(Germany) Florian Mayer	4	1	4
3	(Switzerland) Roger Federer	6	6	6
26	(Russia) Mikhail Youzhny	1	2	2
7	(Spain) David Ferrer	7^{7}	6^{6}	4	6^{4}
4	(United Kingdom) Andy Murray	6^{5}	7^{8}	6	7^{7}
5	(France) Jo-Wilfried Tsonga	7^{7}	4	7^{7}	6
27	(Germany) Philipp Kohlschreiber	6^{5}	6	6^{3}	2

Semifinals
1	(Serbia) Novak Djokovic	3	6	4	3
3	(Switzerland) Roger Federer	6	3	6	6
4	(United Kingdom) Andy Murray	6	6	3	7
5	(France) Jo-Wilfried Tsonga	3	4	6	5

Final
3	(Switzerland) Roger Federer	4	7	6	6
4	(United Kingdom) Andy Murray	6	5	3	4

=== Top half ===
==== Section 1 ====
First round
1	(Serbia) N Djokovic	6	6	6
(Spain) JC Ferrero	3	3	1
(United States) R Harrison	4	6	6	6
(Chinese Taipei) Y-h Lu	6	3	4	2
PR	(Germany) B Becker	6^{4}	7	6	6
(United States) J Blake	7^{7}	5	0	4
(Ukraine) S Stakhovsky	1	0^{r}
28	(Czech Republic) R Štěpánek	6	1
24	(Spain) M Granollers	5	6^{5}	6	6	6
(Serbia) V Troicki	7	7^{7}	3	2	8
(Slovakia) M Kližan	7	3	7^{8}	1	11
(Argentina) JI Chela	5	6	6^{6}	6	9
(France) J Chardy	6	6	1
(Italy) F Volandri	0	1	0^{r}
(Argentina) L Mayer	4	6^{5}	6^{5}
15	(Argentina) J Mónaco	6	7^{7}	7^{7}

Second round
1	(Serbia) N Djokovic	6	6	6
(United States) R Harrison	4	4	4
PR	(Germany) B Becker	2	6^{4}	3
28	(Czech Republic) R Štěpánek	6	7^{7}	6
(Serbia) V Troicki	6	4	5	7^{7}	6
(Slovakia) M Kližan	4	6	7	6^{3}	4
(France) J Chardy	2	6	3	6^{3}
15	(Argentina) J Mónaco	6	3	6	7^{7}

Third round
1	(Serbia) N Djokovic	4	6	6	6
28	(Czech Republic) R Štěpánek	6	2	2	2
(Serbia) V Troicki	7	7	6
15	(Argentina) J Mónaco	5	5	3

Fourth round
1	(Serbia) N Djokovic	6	6	6
(Serbia) V Troicki	3	1	3

==== Section 2 ====
First round
12	(Spain) N Almagro	6^{4}	3	7^{7}	6	6
(Belgium) O Rochus	7^{7}	6	6^{4}	2	4
Q	(France) G Rufin	6	3	5	6	6
(Belgium) S Darcis	4	6	7	4	4
(Argentina) C Berlocq	5	7^{7}	3	6^{2}
Q	(Belgium) R Bemelmans	7	6^{4}	6	7^{7}
(Germany) T Kamke	2	2	2
18	(France) R Gasquet	6	6	6
31	(Germany) F Mayer	7^{7}	6	6
(Russia) D Tursunov	6^{3}	2	3
(Germany) P Petzschner	6	6	6
(Slovenia) B Kavčič	4	4	2
Q	(Italy) S Bolelli	6	3	3	3
Q	(Poland) J Janowicz	3	6	6	6
(Latvia) E Gulbis	7^{7}	7^{7}	7^{7}
6	(Czech Republic) T Berdych	6^{5}	6^{4}	6^{4}

Second round
12	(Spain) N Almagro	6	5	6	6
Q	(France) G Rufin	2	7	2	4
Q	(Belgium) R Bemelmans	3	4	4
18	(France) R Gasquet	6	6	6
31	(Germany) F Mayer	3	3	6	6	6
(Germany) P Petzschner	6	6	4	2	4
Q	(Poland) J Janowicz	2	6	3	7^{7}	9
(Latvia) E Gulbis	6	4	6	6^{2}	7

Third round
12	(Spain) N Almagro	3	4	4
18	(France) R Gasquet	6	6	6
31	(Germany) F Mayer	7^{7}	3	2	6	7
Q	(Poland) J Janowicz	6^{5}	6	6	3	5

Fourth round
18	(France) R Gasquet	3	1	6	2
31	(Germany) F Mayer	6	6	3	6

==== Section 3 ====
First round
3	(Switzerland) R Federer	6	6	6
(Spain) A Ramos Viñolas	1	1	1
(Italy) F Fognini	3	6	6	7
(France) M Llodra	6	3	4	5
Q	(Spain) A Menéndez Maceiras	3	1	6^{7}
Q	(United States) M Russell	6	6	7^{9}
(Luxembourg) G Müller	2	5	6^{4}
29	(France) J Benneteau	6	7	7^{7}
17	(Spain) F Verdasco	7^{7}	6	7
Q	(Chinese Taipei) J Wang	6^{3}	4	5
WC	(Slovenia) G Žemlja	6	3	7^{7}	6
WC	(United Kingdom) J Goodall	4	6	6^{3}	4
(Belgium) X Malisse	6	6	7
(Australia) M Matosevic	2	2	5
PR	(France) P-H Mathieu	3	4^{r}
13	(France) G Simon	6	5

Second round
3	(Switzerland) R Federer	6	6	6
(Italy) F Fognini	1	3	2
Q	(United States) M Russell	6^{4}	6	4	5
29	(France) J Benneteau	7^{7}	2	6	7
17	(Spain) F Verdasco	7^{7}	7^{7}	3	6
WC	(Slovenia) G Žemlja	6^{4}	6^{4}	6	3
(Belgium) X Malisse	6	6	7^{7}
13	(France) G Simon	4	4	6^{5}

Third round
3	(Switzerland) R Federer	4	6^{3}	6	7^{8}	6
29	(France) J Benneteau	6	7^{7}	2	6^{6}	1
17	(Spain) F Verdasco	6	6^{5}	1	6	3
(Belgium) X Malisse	1	7^{7}	6	4	6

Fourth round
3	(Switzerland) R Federer	7^{7}	6	4	6
(Belgium) X Malisse	6^{1}	1	6	3

==== Section 4 ====
First round
11	(United States) J Isner	4	7^{9}	6	6^{7}	5
(Colombia) A Falla	6	6^{7}	3	7^{9}	7
(Italy) P Lorenzi	3	7	7^{7}	5	2
(France) N Mahut	6	5	6^{3}	7	6
(Russia) I Andreev	1	7^{7}	7^{9}	7
WC	(United Kingdom) O Golding	6	6^{4}	6^{7}	5
(Uzbekistan) D Istomin	6^{2}	6	3	6	8
23	(Italy) A Seppi	7^{7}	4	6	3	6
26	(Russia) M Youzhny	4	6	6	6
(United States) D Young	6	3	2	3
Q	(Spain) Í Cervantes	2	6^{4}	6	6	6
(Italy) F Cipolla	6	7^{7}	3	2	1
Q	(United States) R Sweeting	6	2
(Italy) P Starace	2	0^{r}
(Argentina) D Nalbandian	4	6^{4}	2
8	(Serbia) J Tipsarević	6	7^{7}	6

Second round
(Colombia) A Falla	6	6	4	4	7
(France) N Mahut	4	3	6	6	5
(Russia) I Andreev	3	6^{3}	6	2
(Uzbekistan) D Istomin	6	7^{7}	4	6
26	(Russia) M Youzhny	6	6	6
Q	(Spain) Í Cervantes	1	3	4
Q	(United States) R Sweeting	7	5	4	2
8	(Serbia) J Tipsarević	5	7	6	6

Third round
(Colombia) A Falla	3	4	6	6^{5}
(Uzbekistan) D Istomin	6	6	3	7^{7}
26	(Russia) M Youzhny	6	6	3	6
8	(Serbia) J Tipsarević	3	4	6	3

Fourth round
(Uzbekistan) D Istomin	3	7	4	7^{7}	5
26	(Russia) M Youzhny	6	5	6	6^{5}	7

=== Bottom half ===
==== Section 5 ====
First round
7	(Spain) D Ferrer	7^{7}	6	6
Q	(Germany) D Brown	6^{5}	4	4
Q	(France) K de Schepper	6	6	6
(Germany) M Bachinger	4	2	2
LL	(United States) W Odesnik	3	6	7^{7}	3	4
(Germany) B Phau	6	3	6^{3}	6	6
WC	(United Kingdom) J Baker	6^{1}	4	5
30	(United States) A Roddick	7^{7}	6	7
19	(Japan) K Nishikori	7	6	6
(Kazakhstan) M Kukushkin	5	3	4
Q	(Russia) A Kuznetsov	6	6^{3}	4	6	4
Q	(France) F Serra	3	7^{7}	6	4	6
(Japan) G Soeda	6	6	6
(Russia) I Kunitsyn	3	2	1
(Netherlands) R Haase	4	6	6^{3}	5
9	(Argentina) JM del Potro	6	3	7^{7}	7

Second round
7	(Spain) D Ferrer	7^{7}	6	6
Q	(France) K de Schepper	6^{1}	2	4
(Germany) B Phau	3	6^{1}	3
30	(United States) A Roddick	6	7^{7}	6
19	(Japan) K Nishikori	6	7	6
Q	(France) F Serra	3	5	2
(Japan) G Soeda	2	3	6	4
9	(Argentina) JM del Potro	6	6	1	6

Third round
7	(Spain) D Ferrer	2	7^{10}	6	6
30	(United States) A Roddick	6	6^{8}	4	3
19	(Japan) K Nishikori	3	6^{3}	1
9	(Argentina) JM del Potro	6	7^{7}	6

Fourth round
7	(Spain) D Ferrer	6	6	6
9	(Argentina) JM del Potro	3	2	3

==== Section 6 ====
First round
16	(Croatia) M Čilić	6	3	6	6
(Germany) C-M Stebe	4	6	3	2
(Japan) T Ito	6^{6}	3	3
(Poland) Ł Kubot	7^{8}	6	6
(Canada) V Pospisil	5	7^{7}	3	4
(United States) S Querrey	7	6^{5}	6	6
(Colombia) S Giraldo	4	4	4
21	(Canada) M Raonic	6	6	6
32	(South Africa) K Anderson	5	6^{3}	7^{7}	3
(Bulgaria) G Dimitrov	7	7^{7}	6^{4}	6
(Spain) A Montañés	2	4	4
(Cyprus) M Baghdatis	6	6	6
(Croatia) I Karlović	6	6	7^{7}
(Israel) D Sela	4	4	6^{5}
(Russia) N Davydenko	1	1	4
4	(United Kingdom) A Murray	6	6	6

Second round
16	(Croatia) M Čilić	7^{7}	6	6
(Poland) Ł Kubot	6^{4}	2	1
(United States) S Querrey	6^{3}	7^{9}	7^{10}	6
21	(Canada) M Raonic	7^{7}	6^{7}	6^{8}	4
(Bulgaria) G Dimitrov	5	1^{r}
(Cyprus) M Baghdatis	7	4
(Croatia) I Karlović	5	7^{7}	2	6^{4}
4	(United Kingdom) A Murray	7	6^{5}	6	7^{7}

Third round
16	(Croatia) M Čilić	7^{8}	6	6^{2}	6^{3}	17
(United States) S Querrey	6^{6}	4	7^{7}	7^{7}	15
(Cyprus) M Baghdatis	5	6	5	1
4	(United Kingdom) A Murray	7	3	7	6

Fourth round
16	(Croatia) M Čilić	5	2	3
4	(United Kingdom) A Murray	7	6	6

==== Section 7 ====
First round
5	(France) J-W Tsonga	6	6	6
WC	(Australia) L Hewitt	3	4	4
(France) É Roger-Vasselin	7^{7}	3	6^{4}	7	8
(Spain) G García López	6^{2}	6	7^{7}	5	10
(Slovakia) L Lacko	7^{7}	6	6
(Romania) A Ungur	6^{4}	1	3
(Austria) J Melzer	3	7^{7}	2	6	8
25	(Switzerland) S Wawrinka	6	6^{2}	6	4	6
20	(Australia) B Tomic	6	3	4	4
WC	(Belgium) D Goffin	3	6	6	6
Q	(United States) J Levine	6	6^{6}	6	6
(Slovakia) K Beck	4	7^{8}	3	2
WC	(United Kingdom) J Ward	4	6	3	6	6
(Spain) P Andújar	6	0	6	3	3
(Spain) R Ramírez Hidalgo	6^{3}	5	6^{1}
10	(United States) M Fish	7^{7}	7	7^{7}

Second round
5	(France) J-W Tsonga	6^{3}	6	6	6
(Spain) G García López	7^{7}	4	1	3
(Slovakia) L Lacko	6	6^{4}	3	6	6
(Austria) J Melzer	4	7^{7}	6	3	4
WC	(Belgium) D Goffin	4	6	6	6
Q	(United States) J Levine	6	4	1	3
WC	(United Kingdom) J Ward	3	7	4	7^{7}	3
10	(United States) M Fish	6	5	6	6^{3}	6

Third round
5	(France) J-W Tsonga	6	6	6
(Slovakia) L Lacko	4	3	3
WC	(Belgium) D Goffin	3	6^{6}	6^{6}
10	(United States) M Fish	6	7^{8}	7^{8}

Fourth round
5	(France) J-W Tsonga	4	7^{7}	6	6
10	(United States) M Fish	6	6^{4}	4	4

==== Section 8 ====
First round
14	(Spain) F López	6^{4}	6	6^{5}	4
(Finland) J Nieminen	7^{7}	3	7^{7}	6
Q	(United States) B Baker	7^{7}	6	6
(Portugal) R Machado	6^{2}	4	0
(Australia) M Ebden	1	3	7^{7}	3
(France) B Paire	6	6	6^{1}	6
(Russia) A Bogomolov Jr.	3	4	5
22	(Ukraine) A Dolgopolov	6	6	7
27	(Germany) P Kohlschreiber	3	7^{10}	6^{5}	7^{7}	6
WC	(Germany) T Haas	6	6^{8}	7^{7}	6^{1}	2
Q	(Estonia) J Zopp	6	6	3	4	7
(Tunisia) M Jaziri	4	4	6	6	9
(Czech Republic) L Rosol	6	3	7^{7}	7
(Croatia) I Dodig	4	6	6^{0}	5
(Brazil) T Bellucci	6^{0}	2	3
2	(Spain) R Nadal	7^{7}	6	6

Second round
(Finland) J Nieminen	0	2	4
Q	(United States) B Baker	6	6	6
(France) B Paire	7^{7}	6	6
22	(Ukraine) A Dolgopolov	6^{2}	4	4
27	(Germany) P Kohlschreiber	6	7^{7}	6
(Tunisia) M Jaziri	1	6^{2}	1
(Czech Republic) L Rosol	6^{9}	6	6	2	6
2	(Spain) R Nadal	7^{11}	4	4	6	4

Third round
Q	(United States) B Baker	6	4	6	6
(France) B Paire	4	6	1	3
27	(Germany) P Kohlschreiber	6	6	7^{8}
(Czech Republic) L Rosol	2	3	6^{6}

Fourth round
Q	(United States) B Baker	1	6^{4}	3
27	(Germany) P Kohlschreiber	6	7^{7}	6

Preceded by 2012 French Open – Men's singles	Grand Slam men's singles	Succeeded by 2012 US Open – Men's singles
