= 2013 VTR Open =

- Date: 4–10 February
- Edition: 20th
- Draw: 28S / 16D
- Prize money: $467,800
- Surface: Clay / outdoor
- Location: Viña del Mar, Chile

Champions

Singles
- (Argentina) Horacio Zeballos

Doubles
- (Italy) Paolo Lorenzi / (Italy) Potito Starace
- Chile Open

The 2013 VTR Open was a men's tennis tournament played on clay courts. It was the 20th edition of the VTR Open, and part of the ATP World Tour 250 series of the 2013 ATP World Tour. It took place in Viña del Mar, Chile from February 2 through to February 10, 2013. This tournament was notably the first one in which Rafael Nadal competed since his defeat at the 2012 Wimbledon Championships.

== Singles main draw entrants ==
=== Seeds ===
| Country | Player | Rank^{1} | Seed |
|---|---|---|---|
| ESP | Rafael Nadal | 5 | 1 |
| ARG | Juan Mónaco | 12 | 2 |
| FRA | Jérémy Chardy | 25 | 3 |
| ESP | Pablo Andújar | 45 | 4 |
| ESP | Albert Ramos | 51 | 5 |
| ITA | Paolo Lorenzi | 61 | 6 |
| ESP | Daniel Gimeno Traver | 66 | 7 |
| ARG | Carlos Berlocq | 70 | 8 |

- Rankings are as of January 28, 2013.

=== Other entrants ===
The following players received wildcards into the singles main draw:

- (Chile) Christian Garín
- (Chile) Nicolás Massú
- (Spain) Rafael Nadal

The following players received entry from the qualifying draw:

- (Argentina) Federico Delbonis
- (Serbia) Dušan Lajović
- (Italy) Gianluca Naso
- (Argentina) Diego Schwartzman

=== Withdrawals ===
Before the tournament

- (Russia) Igor Andreev

During the tournament

- (France) Guillaume Rufin (abdominal strain)

== Doubles main draw entrants ==
=== Seeds ===
| Country | Player | Country | Player | Rank^{1} | Seed |
|---|---|---|---|---|---|
| ITA | Daniele Bracciali | BRA | Marcelo Melo | 41 | 1 |
| CZE | František Čermák | CZE | Lukáš Dlouhý | 93 | 2 |
| GER | Dustin Brown | GER | Christopher Kas | 122 | 3 |
| AUT | Oliver Marach | ARG | Horacio Zeballos | 133 | 4 |

- Rankings are as of January 28, 2013.

=== Other entrants ===
The following pairs received wildcards into the doubles main draw:

- (Chile) Christian Garín / (Chile) (United States) Nicolás Jarry
- (Chile) Gonzalo Lama / (Chile) Nicolás Massú

== Finals ==
=== Singles ===
- (Argentina) Horacio Zeballos defeated (Spain) Rafael Nadal, 6–7^{(2–7)}, 7–6^{(8–6)}, 6–4
- It was Zeballos's 1st title of his career.

=== Doubles ===
- (Italy) Paolo Lorenzi / (Italy) Potito Starace defeated (Argentina) Juan Mónaco / (Spain) Rafael Nadal, 6–2, 6–4
