= 2012 Wimbledon Championships – Women's doubles =

Women's doubles
- 2012 Wimbledon Championships

Final
- Champions: (United States) Serena Williams (United States) Venus Williams
- Runners-up: (Czech Republic) Andrea Hlaváčková (Czech Republic) Lucie Hradecká
- Score: 7–5, 6–4

Details
- Draw: 64 (4 Q / 3 WC )
- Seeds: 16

Events
Singles	men	women		boys	girls
Doubles	men	women	mixed	boys	girls
WC Singles	men	women	quad
WC Doubles	men	women	quad
Legends	men	women	seniors
← 2011 ·	Wimbledon Championships	· 2013 →

Serena and Venus Williams defeated Andrea Hlaváčková and Lucie Hradecká in the final, 7–5, 6–4 to win the ladies' doubles tennis title at the 2012 Wimbledon Championships. It was the Williams sisters' fifth Wimbledon title together, and their 13th major doubles title together overall. In all five doubles crowns, one of the sisters also won the singles title, Venus in 2000 and 2008, Serena in 2002, 2009, and now in 2012.

Květa Peschke and Katarina Srebotnik were the defending champions, but lost in the second round to Francesca Schiavone and Flavia Pennetta.

== Seeds ==
1. (United States) Liezel Huber / (United States) Lisa Raymond (semifinals)
2. (Italy) Sara Errani / (Italy) Roberta Vinci (quarterfinals)
3. (Czech Republic) Květa Peschke / (Slovenia) Katarina Srebotnik (second round)
4. (Russia) Maria Kirilenko / (Russia) Nadia Petrova (second round)
5. (Russia) Ekaterina Makarova / (Russia) Elena Vesnina (quarterfinals)
6. (Czech Republic) Andrea Hlaváčková / (Czech Republic) Lucie Hradecká (final)
7. (Kazakhstan) Yaroslava Shvedova / (Kazakhstan) Galina Voskoboeva (third round)
8. (Czech Republic) Iveta Benešová / (Czech Republic) Barbora Záhlavová-Strýcová (second round)
9. (Spain) Nuria Llagostera Vives / (Spain) María José Martínez Sánchez (quarterfinals)
10. (United States) Raquel Kops-Jones / (United States) Abigail Spears (quarterfinals)
11. (South Africa) Natalie Grandin / (Czech Republic) Vladimíra Uhlířová (third round)
12. (Spain) Anabel Medina Garrigues / (Spain) Arantxa Parra Santonja (first round)
13. (United States) Bethanie Mattek-Sands / (India) Sania Mirza (third round)
14. (Argentina) Gisela Dulko / (Argentina) Paola Suárez (first round)
15. (Romania) Irina-Camelia Begu / (Romania) Monica Niculescu (second round, retired)
16. (Chinese Taipei) Chuang Chia-jung / (Russia) Vera Dushevina (first round)

Click on the seed number of a player to go to their draw section.

== Draw ==
=== Key ===
- Q = Qualifier
- WC = Wild card
- LL = Lucky loser
- Alt = Alternate
- ITF = ITF entry
- PR = Protected ranking
- SR = Special ranking
- SE = Special exempt
- JE = Junior exempt
- JR = Junior Accelerator Programme entrant
- CO = College Accelerator Programme entrant
- NG = Next Gen Accelerator Program entrant
- w/o = Walkover
- r = Retired
- d = Defaulted

=== Finals ===
Quarterfinals
1	(United States) Liezel Huber (United States) Lisa Raymond	7^{7}	6
5	(Russia) Ekaterina Makarova (Russia) Elena Vesnina	6^{4}	3
(United States) Serena Williams (United States) Venus Williams	6	6
10	(United States) Raquel Kops-Jones (United States) Abigail Spears	1	1
9	(Spain) Nuria Llagostera Vives (Spain) María José Martínez Sánchez	2	7^{7}	4
(Italy) Flavia Pennetta (Italy) Francesca Schiavone	6	6^{0}	6
6	(Czech Republic) Andrea Hlaváčková (Czech Republic) Lucie Hradecká	6	6
2	(Italy) Sara Errani (Italy) Roberta Vinci	3	4

Semifinals
1	(United States) Liezel Huber (United States) Lisa Raymond	6	1	2
(United States) Serena Williams (United States) Venus Williams	2	6	6
(Italy) Flavia Pennetta (Italy) Francesca Schiavone	6	3	4
6	(Czech Republic) Andrea Hlaváčková (Czech Republic) Lucie Hradecká	2	6	6

Final
(United States) Serena Williams (United States) Venus Williams	7	6
6	(Czech Republic) Andrea Hlaváčková (Czech Republic) Lucie Hradecká	5	4

=== Top half ===
==== Section 1 ====
First round
1	(United States) L Huber (United States) L Raymond	7	6
(Romania) A Cadanțu (China) S Zheng	5	0
(Romania) S Cîrstea (Japan) A Morita	3	2
(Australia) C Dellacqua (Australia) S Stosur	6	6
Q	(Croatia) M Lučić (Russia) V Savinykh	4	6	6
WC	(United Kingdom) T Moore (United Kingdom) M South	6	4	1
(Germany) A-L Grönefeld (Croatia) P Martić	6	6
16	(Chinese Taipei) C-j Chuang (Russia) V Dushevina	4	4
12	(Spain) A Medina Garrigues (Spain) A Parra Santonja	6	6^{6}	4
(Poland) K Jans-Ignacik (Poland) A Rosolska	4	7^{8}	6
(China) S Peng (China) J Zheng	2	2
(New Zealand) M Erakovic (Thailand) T Tanasugarn	6	6
Q	(Croatia) D Jurak (Hungary) K Marosi	6	7
(Czech Republic) R Voráčová (Czech Republic) K Zakopalová	3	5
(Greece) E Daniilidou (Netherlands) A Rus	3	2
5	(Russia) E Makarova (Russia) E Vesnina	6	6

Second round
1	(United States) L Huber (United States) L Raymond	5	6	6
(Australia) C Dellacqua (Australia) S Stosur	7	3	4
Q	(Croatia) M Lučić (Russia) V Savinykh	6^{1}	6	1
(Germany) A-L Grönefeld (Croatia) P Martić	7^{7}	3	6
(Poland) K Jans-Ignacik (Poland) A Rosolska	6^{4}	3
(New Zealand) M Erakovic (Thailand) T Tanasugarn	7^{7}	6
Q	(Croatia) D Jurak (Hungary) K Marosi	5	4
5	(Russia) E Makarova (Russia) E Vesnina	7	6

Third round
1	(United States) L Huber (United States) L Raymond	7^{7}	5	6
(Germany) A-L Grönefeld (Croatia) P Martić	6^{3}	7	4
(New Zealand) M Erakovic (Thailand) T Tanasugarn	3	6	5
5	(Russia) E Makarova (Russia) E Vesnina	6	2	7

Quarterfinals
1	(United States) L Huber (United States) L Raymond	7^{7}	6
5	(Russia) E Makarova (Russia) E Vesnina	6^{4}	3

==== Section 2 ====
First round
4	(Russia) M Kirilenko (Russia) N Petrova	6	6
(Hungary) T Babos (Italy) A Brianti	3	0
Q	(Serbia) V Dolonc (Ukraine) O Savchuk	0	3
(United States) S Williams (United States) V Williams	6	6
(Serbia) J Janković (France) V Razzano	3	7	6
(France) S Foretz Gacon (France) K Mladenovic	6	5	8
(Russia) A Kudryavtseva (United States) S Stephens	4	2
13	(United States) B Mattek-Sands (India) S Mirza	6	6
10	(United States) R Kops-Jones (United States) A Spears	6	6
(Russia) N Bratchikova (Georgia (country)) A Tatishvili	3	4
(Latvia) L Dekmeijere (United States) V Lepchenko	7^{7}	3	6
(Sweden) S Arvidsson (Sweden) J Larsson	6^{3}	6	3
(Uzbekistan) A Amanmuradova (Ukraine) K Bondarenko	6^{2}	3
(Germany) K Barrois (Russia) V Diatchenko	7^{7}	6
(Romania) S Halep (Canada) A Wozniak	1	0
7	(Kazakhstan) Y Shvedova (Kazakhstan) G Voskoboeva	6	6

Second round
4	(Russia) M Kirilenko (Russia) N Petrova	6	3	7
(United States) S Williams (United States) V Williams	3	6	9
(France) S Foretz Gacon (France) K Mladenovic	3	2
13	(United States) B Mattek-Sands (India) S Mirza	6	6
10	(United States) R Kops-Jones (United States) A Spears	6	7^{7}
(Latvia) L Dekmeijere (United States) V Lepchenko	3	6^{4}
(Germany) K Barrois (Russia) V Diatchenko	4	4
7	(Kazakhstan) Y Shvedova (Kazakhstan) G Voskoboeva	6	6

Third round
(United States) S Williams (United States) V Williams	6	6
13	(United States) B Mattek-Sands (India) S Mirza	4	3
10	(United States) R Kops-Jones (United States) A Spears	7	2	6
7	(Kazakhstan) Y Shvedova (Kazakhstan) G Voskoboeva	5	6	4

Quarterfinals
(United States) S Williams (United States) V Williams	6	6
10	(United States) R Kops-Jones (United States) A Spears	1	1

=== Bottom half ===
==== Section 3 ====
First round
8	(Czech Republic) I Benešová (Czech Republic) B Záhlavová-Strýcová	6	6
(United States) V King (United States) Y Schnack	4	1
(Slovakia) J Husárová (Kazakhstan) K Pervak	2	3
(Belarus) O Govortsova (Luxembourg) M Minella	6	6
(Slovenia) A Klepač (Australia) A Rodionova	6	3	6
(United States) J Craybas (Germany) J Görges	4	6	3
(Chinese Taipei) H-c Chan (Chinese Taipei) Y-j Chan	4	4
9	(Spain) N Llagostera Vives (Spain) MJ Martínez Sánchez	6	6
15	(Romania) I-C Begu (Romania) M Niculescu	6	6
(United Kingdom) E Baltacha (United Kingdom) A Keothavong	3	2
(Chinese Taipei) S-w Hsieh (Germany) S Lisicki	6	7^{7}
WC	(United Kingdom) L Robson (United Kingdom) H Watson	3	6^{4}
(Russia) A Pavlyuchenkova (Czech Republic) L Šafářová	2	7	4
(Italy) F Pennetta (Italy) F Schiavone	6	5	6
WC	(United Kingdom) N Broady (United Kingdom) J Konta	2	4
3	(Czech Republic) K Peschke (Slovenia) K Srebotnik	6	6

Second round
8	(Czech Republic) I Benešová (Czech Republic) B Záhlavová-Strýcová	5	5
(Belarus) O Govortsova (Luxembourg) M Minella	7	7
(Slovenia) A Klepač (Australia) A Rodionova	3	2
9	(Spain) N Llagostera Vives (Spain) MJ Martínez Sánchez	6	6
15	(Romania) I-C Begu (Romania) M Niculescu	3	0^{r}
(Chinese Taipei) S-w Hsieh (Germany) S Lisicki	6	2
(Italy) F Pennetta (Italy) F Schiavone	6	4	6
3	(Czech Republic) K Peschke (Slovenia) K Srebotnik	3	6	1

Third round
(Belarus) O Govortsova (Luxembourg) M Minella	6^{5}	4
9	(Spain) N Llagostera Vives (Spain) MJ Martínez Sánchez	7^{7}	6
(Chinese Taipei) S-w Hsieh (Germany) S Lisicki	w/o
(Italy) F Pennetta (Italy) F Schiavone

Quarterfinals
9	(Spain) N Llagostera Vives (Spain) MJ Martínez Sánchez	2	7^{7}	4
(Italy) F Pennetta (Italy) F Schiavone	6	6^{0}	6

==== Section 4 ====
First round
6	(Czech Republic) A Hlaváčková (Czech Republic) L Hradecká	6	6
(Japan) K Date-Krumm (Japan) R Fujiwara	4	3
(Germany) M Barthel (Germany) A Kerber	0	1
(Slovakia) D Cibulková (Slovakia) D Hantuchová	6	6
Q	(United States) L Lee-Waters (United States) M Moulton-Levy	3	6	2
(Spain) L Domínguez Lino (Spain) C Suárez Navarro	6	4	6
(Russia) A Panova (China) S Zhang	2	7	3
11	(South Africa) N Grandin (Czech Republic) V Uhlířová	6	5	6
14	(Argentina) G Dulko (Argentina) P Suárez	6	2	4
(United States) I Falconi (South Africa) C Scheepers	3	6	6
(Israel) S Pe'er (Belgium) Y Wickmayer	2	3
(Poland) A Radwańska (Poland) U Radwańska	6	6
(United States) C McHale (Austria) T Paszek	6	6
(France) A Cornet (France) P Parmentier	4	3
(Czech Republic) E Birnerová (Czech Republic) P Cetkovská	2	1
2	(Italy) S Errani (Italy) R Vinci	6	6

Second round
6	(Czech Republic) A Hlaváčková (Czech Republic) L Hradecká	6	6
(Slovakia) D Cibulková (Slovakia) D Hantuchová	2	4
(Spain) L Domínguez Lino (Spain) C Suárez Navarro	2	6	4
11	(South Africa) N Grandin (Czech Republic) V Uhlířová	6	4	6
(United States) I Falconi (South Africa) C Scheepers	5	1
(Poland) A Radwańska (Poland) U Radwańska	7	6
(United States) C McHale (Austria) T Paszek	1	3
2	(Italy) S Errani (Italy) R Vinci	6	6

Third round
6	(Czech Republic) A Hlaváčková (Czech Republic) L Hradecká	5	6	6
11	(South Africa) N Grandin (Czech Republic) V Uhlířová	7	3	3
(Poland) A Radwańska (Poland) U Radwańska	w/o
2	(Italy) S Errani (Italy) R Vinci

Quarterfinals
6	(Czech Republic) A Hlaváčková (Czech Republic) L Hradecká	6	6
2	(Italy) S Errani (Italy) R Vinci	3	4
