= 2012 Wimbledon Championships – Women's singles =

Women's singles
- 2012 Wimbledon Championships

Final
- Champion: (United States) Serena Williams
- Runner-up: (Poland) Agnieszka Radwańska
- Score: 6–1, 5–7, 6–2

Details
- Draw: 128 (12Q / 7WC)
- Seeds: 32

Events
Singles	men	women		boys	girls
Doubles	men	women	mixed	boys	girls
WC Singles	men	women	quad
WC Doubles	men	women	quad
Legends	men	women	seniors
- Wimbledon Championships

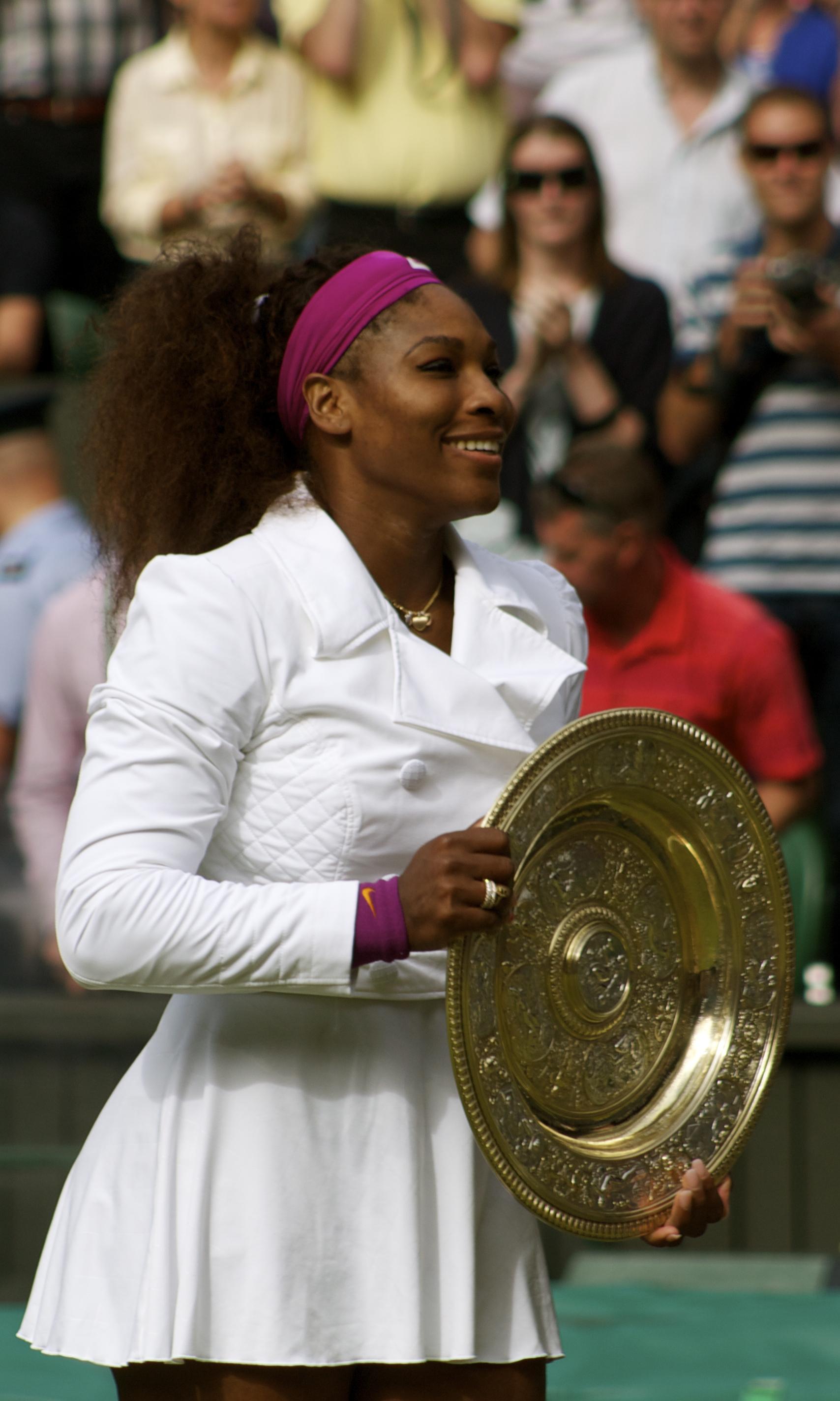
Serena Williams with the Venus Rosewater Dish after winning the final.

Serena Williams defeated Agnieszka Radwańska in the final, 6–1, 5–7, 6–2 to win the ladies' singles tennis title at the 2012 Wimbledon Championships. It was her fifth Wimbledon singles title and 14th major singles title overall. Radwańska was the first Pole to reach a major singles final since Jadwiga Jędrzejowska in 1939, and the first to do so in the Open Era.

Petra Kvitová was the defending champion, but lost in the quarterfinals to Williams. With the loss of Maria Sharapova in the fourth round, a first time finalist was guaranteed at the top half of the draw.

Yaroslava Shvedova was the first player in the Open Era to win a 'golden set' at Wimbledon, winning the first set of her 6–0, 6–4 victory over the reigning French Open runner-up and 10th seed Sara Errani in the third round without dropping a single point.

Sabine Lisicki defeated the reigning French Open champion (the incumbent world No. 1, Sharapova) en route to the Wimbledon quarterfinals for the third straight time. She previously defeated Li Na in 2011 and Svetlana Kuznetsova in 2009, and missed the 2010 championships due to injury.

Victoria Azarenka regained the world No. 1 singles ranking by reaching the quarterfinals after Sharapova failed to reach the final. Four of the top five seeds were in contention for the top ranking during the tournament. Had Agnieszka Radwańska won the decider set of the final, she would be the World No.1, and she did not achieve it later in her career, being the closest non-top-1 player.

== Seeds ==
1. (Russia) Maria Sharapova (fourth round)
2. (Belarus) Victoria Azarenka (semifinals)
3. (Poland) Agnieszka Radwańska (final)
4. (Czech Republic) Petra Kvitová (quarterfinals)
5. (Australia) Samantha Stosur (second round)
6. (United States) Serena Williams (champion)
7. (Denmark) Caroline Wozniacki (first round)
8. (Germany) Angelique Kerber (semifinals)
9. (France) Marion Bartoli (second round)
10. (Italy) Sara Errani (third round)
11. (China) Li Na (second round)
12. (Russia) Vera Zvonareva (third round, retired)
13. (Slovakia) Dominika Cibulková (first round)
14. (Serbia) Ana Ivanovic (fourth round)
15. (Germany) Sabine Lisicki (quarterfinals)
16. (Italy) Flavia Pennetta (first round)

17. (Russia) Maria Kirilenko (quarterfinals)
18. (Serbia) Jelena Janković (first round)
19. (Czech Republic) Lucie Šafářová (first round)
20. (Russia) Nadia Petrova (third round)
21. (Italy) Roberta Vinci (fourth round)
22. (Germany) Julia Görges (third round)
23. (Czech Republic) Petra Cetkovská (second round)
24. (Italy) Francesca Schiavone (fourth round)
25. (China) Zheng Jie (third round)
26. (Spain) Anabel Medina Garrigues (second round)
27. (Slovakia) Daniela Hantuchová (first round)
28. (United States) Christina McHale (third round)
29. (Romania) Monica Niculescu (first round)
30. (China) Peng Shuai (fourth round)
31. (Russia) Anastasia Pavlyuchenkova (second round)
32. (Russia) Svetlana Kuznetsova (first round)

Click on the seed number of a player to go to their draw section.

== Draw ==
Key

- Q = Qualifier
- WC = Wild card
- LL = Lucky loser
- Alt = Alternate
- ITF = ITF entry
- PR = Protected ranking
- SR = Special ranking
- SE = Special exempt
- JE = Junior exempt
- JR = Junior Accelerator Programme entrant
- CO = College Accelerator Programme entrant
- NG = Next Gen Accelerator Program entrant
- w/o = Walkover
- r = Retired
- d = Defaulted

=== Finals ===
Quarterfinals
15	(Germany) Sabine Lisicki	3	7^{9}	5
8	(Germany) Angelique Kerber	6	6^{7}	7
3	(Poland) Agnieszka Radwańska	7	4	7
17	(Russia) Maria Kirilenko	5	6	5
6	(United States) Serena Williams	6	7
4	(Czech Republic) Petra Kvitová	3	5
(Austria) Tamira Paszek	3	6^{4}
2	(Belarus) Victoria Azarenka	6	7^{7}

Semifinals
8	(Germany) Angelique Kerber	3	4
3	(Poland) Agnieszka Radwańska	6	6
6	(United States) Serena Williams	6	7^{8}
2	(Belarus) Victoria Azarenka	3	6^{6}

Final
3	(Poland) Agnieszka Radwańska	1	7	2
6	(United States) Serena Williams	6	5	6

=== Top half ===
==== Section 1 ====
First round
1	(Russia) M Sharapova	6	6
(Australia) An Rodionova	2	3
Q	(Serbia) V Dolonc	7	0	5
(Bulgaria) T Pironkova	5	6	7
(Chinese Taipei) S-w Hsieh	6	6
WC	(France) V Razzano	2	4
(France) S Foretz Gacon	6	3	6
29	(Romania) M Niculescu	4	6	3
23	(Czech Republic) P Cetkovská	6	6
(United States) V King	4	2
(United States) S Stephens	6	6
Q	(Czech Republic) Ka Plíšková	2	2
(Serbia) B Jovanovski	5	6	2
(Greece) E Daniilidou	7	3	0^{r}
(Croatia) P Martić	4	2
15	(Germany) S Lisicki	6	6

Second round
1	(Russia) M Sharapova	7^{7}	6^{3}	6
(Bulgaria) T Pironkova	6^{3}	7^{7}	0
(Chinese Taipei) S-w Hsieh	6	6
(France) S Foretz Gacon	4	1
23	(Czech Republic) P Cetkovská	6^{6}	6	3
(United States) S Stephens	7^{8}	4	6
(Serbia) B Jovanovski	6	2	6
15	(Germany) S Lisicki	3	6	8

Third round
1	(Russia) M Sharapova	6	6
(Chinese Taipei) S-w Hsieh	1	4
(United States) S Stephens	6^{5}	6	2
15	(Germany) S Lisicki	7^{7}	1	6

Fourth round
1	(Russia) M Sharapova	4	3
15	(Germany) S Lisicki	6	6

==== Section 2 ====
First round
12	(Russia) V Zvonareva	2	7^{7}	6
(Germany) M Barthel	6	6^{3}	4
(Romania) E Gallovits-Hall	6	4	8
(Spain) S Soler Espinosa	4	6	10
(Chinese Taipei) K-c Chang	1	2
(Czech Republic) A Hlaváčková	6	6
(Belgium) K Clijsters	6	6
18	(Serbia) J Janković	2	4
28	(United States) C McHale	6^{4}	6	10
WC	(United Kingdom) J Konta	7^{7}	2	8
(Ukraine) L Tsurenko	6	0	3
(France) M Johansson	3	6	6
(Russia) E Makarova	6	3	6
(Italy) A Brianti	2	6	3
(Czech Republic) L Hradecká	4	1
8	(Germany) A Kerber	6	6

Second round
12	(Russia) V Zvonareva	6	3	6
(Spain) S Soler Espinosa	1	6	1
(Czech Republic) A Hlaváčková	3	3
(Belgium) K Clijsters	6	6
28	(United States) C McHale	7	7
(France) M Johansson	5	5
(Russia) E Makarova	5	3
8	(Germany) A Kerber	7	6

Third round
12	(Russia) V Zvonareva	3	3^{r}
(Belgium) K Clijsters	6	4
28	(United States) C McHale	2	3
8	(Germany) A Kerber	6	6

Fourth round
(Belgium) K Clijsters	1	1
8	(Germany) A Kerber	6	6

==== Section 3 ====
First round
3	(Poland) A Radwańska	6	6
(Slovakia) M Rybáriková	3	3
(United States) V Williams	1	3
(Russia) E Vesnina	6	6
(Czech Republic) I Benešová	2	1
(United Kingdom) H Watson	6	6
(United States) J Hampton	6	7^{7}
27	(Slovakia) D Hantuchová	4	6^{1}
20	(Russia) N Petrova	6	6
Q	(Italy) ME Camerin	0	2
(Hungary) T Babos	6	4	6
WC	(United States) M Oudin	4	6	3
(Thailand) T Tanasugarn	4	2
(Georgia (country)) A Tatishvili	6	6
Q	(Italy) C Giorgi	6	6
16	(Italy) F Pennetta	4	3

Second round
3	(Poland) A Radwańska	6	6
(Russia) E Vesnina	2	1
(United Kingdom) H Watson	6	6
(United States) J Hampton	1	4
20	(Russia) N Petrova	6	6^{3}	9
(Hungary) T Babos	4	7^{7}	7
(Georgia (country)) A Tatishvili	3	1
Q	(Italy) C Giorgi	6	6

Third round
3	(Poland) A Radwańska	6	6
(United Kingdom) H Watson	0	2
20	(Russia) N Petrova	3	6^{6}
Q	(Italy) C Giorgi	6	7^{8}

Fourth round
3	(Poland) A Radwańska	6	6
Q	(Italy) C Giorgi	2	3

==== Section 4 ====
First round
11	(China) N Li	6	6
(Kazakhstan) K Pervak	3	1
(Romania) S Cîrstea	6	6
(France) P Parmentier	4	1
WC	(United Kingdom) N Broady	4	6^{4}
(Spain) L Domínguez Lino	6	7^{7}
(Romania) A Cadanțu	3	1
17	(Russia) M Kirilenko	6	6
30	(China) S Peng	6	6^{3}	6
Q	(Poland) S Zaniewska	2	7^{7}	3
(Australia) J Gajdošová	4	3
(Japan) A Morita	6	6
(Netherlands) A Rus	7	6
LL	(Japan) M Doi	5	3
(Spain) C Suárez Navarro	1	3
5	(Australia) S Stosur	6	6

Second round
11	(China) N Li	3	4
(Romania) S Cîrstea	6	6
(Spain) L Domínguez Lino	1	2
17	(Russia) M Kirilenko	6	6
30	(China) S Peng	7^{7}	6
(Japan) A Morita	6^{4}	3
(Netherlands) A Rus	6	0	6
5	(Australia) S Stosur	2	6	4

Third round
(Romania) S Cîrstea	3	1
17	(Russia) M Kirilenko	6	6
30	(China) S Peng	6	6
(Netherlands) A Rus	1	2

Fourth round
17	(Russia) M Kirilenko	6	6^{6}	6
30	(China) S Peng	1	7^{8}	3

=== Bottom half ===
==== Section 5 ====
First round
6	(United States) S Williams	6	6
(Czech Republic) B Záhlavová-Strýcová	2	4
(Sweden) J Larsson	0	2
Q	(Hungary) M Czink	6	6
(Russia) V Dushevina	2	5
(Canada) A Wozniak	6	7
(Canada) S Dubois	6	4	3
25	(China) J Zheng	4	6	6
19	(Czech Republic) L Šafářová	3	0
(Netherlands) K Bertens	6	6
(South Africa) C Scheepers	6^{5}	6^{5}
WC	(Kazakhstan) Y Shvedova	7^{7}	7^{7}
(Spain) L Pous Tió	3	3
(United Kingdom) A Keothavong	6	6
Q	(United States) C Vandeweghe	1	3
10	(Italy) S Errani	6	6

Second round
6	(United States) S Williams	6	6
Q	(Hungary) M Czink	1	4
(Canada) A Wozniak	4	2
25	(China) J Zheng	6	6
(Netherlands) K Bertens	4	4
WC	(Kazakhstan) Y Shvedova	6	6
(United Kingdom) A Keothavong	1	1
10	(Italy) S Errani	6	6

Third round
6	(United States) S Williams	6^{5}	6	9
25	(China) J Zheng	7^{7}	2	7
WC	(Kazakhstan) Y Shvedova	6	6
10	(Italy) S Errani	0	4

Fourth round
6	(United States) S Williams	6	2	7
WC	(Kazakhstan) Y Shvedova	1	6	5

==== Section 6 ====
First round
13	(Slovakia) D Cibulková	4	1
(Czech Republic) K Zakopalová	6	6
(Belarus) O Govortsova	6	3	6
Q	(Germany) A Beck	3	6	3
(Slovenia) P Hercog	2	2
Q	(Czech Republic) Kr Plíšková	6	6
WC	(United Kingdom) L Robson	6	4	4
24	(Italy) F Schiavone	2	6	6
31	(Russia) A Pavlyuchenkova	6	6
(Sweden) S Arvidsson	1	2
(Austria) P Mayr-Achleitner	2	3
(United States) V Lepchenko	6	6
(United Kingdom) E Baltacha	4	6	6
(Italy) K Knapp	6	4	0
(Uzbekistan) A Amanmuradova	4	4
4	(Czech Republic) P Kvitová	6	6

Second round
(Czech Republic) K Zakopalová	2	6	6
(Belarus) O Govortsova	6	1	2
Q	(Czech Republic) Kr Plíšková	4	4
24	(Italy) F Schiavone	6	6
31	(Russia) A Pavlyuchenkova	6^{4}	4
(United States) V Lepchenko	7^{7}	6
(United Kingdom) E Baltacha	0	4
4	(Czech Republic) P Kvitová	6	6

Third round
(Czech Republic) K Zakopalová	0	4
24	(Italy) F Schiavone	6	6
(United States) V Lepchenko	1	0
4	(Czech Republic) P Kvitová	6	6

Fourth round
24	(Italy) F Schiavone	6	5	1
4	(Czech Republic) P Kvitová	4	7	6

==== Section 7 ====
First round
7	(Denmark) C Wozniacki	7	6^{4}	4
(Austria) T Paszek	5	7^{7}	6
(France) A Cornet	6	7^{7}
(Russia) N Bratchikova	0	6^{1}
(Hungary) G Arn	4	2
(Kazakhstan) G Voskoboeva	6	6
(Belgium) Y Wickmayer	6	6
32	(Russia) S Kuznetsova	2	3
21	(Italy) R Vinci	6	6
WC	(Australia) A Barty	2	4
(Poland) U Radwańska	4	4
(New Zealand) M Erakovic	6	6
Q	(Croatia) M Lučić-Baroni	4	6	6
(Russia) A Panova	6	3	4
(Australia) C Dellacqua	2	4
9	(France) M Bartoli	6	6

Second round
(Austria) T Paszek	6	6
(France) A Cornet	2	1
(Kazakhstan) G Voskoboeva	6	3	6
(Belgium) Y Wickmayer	4	6	8
21	(Italy) R Vinci	6	6
(New Zealand) M Erakovic	4	3
Q	(Croatia) M Lučić-Baroni	6	6
9	(France) M Bartoli	4	3

Third round
(Austria) T Paszek	2	7^{7}	7
(Belgium) Y Wickmayer	6	6^{4}	5
21	(Italy) R Vinci	7^{7}	7^{7}
Q	(Croatia) M Lučić-Baroni	6^{4}	6^{3}

Fourth round
(Austria) T Paszek	6	6
21	(Italy) R Vinci	2	2

==== Section 8 ====
First round
14	(Serbia) A Ivanovic	6	3	6
(Spain) MJ Martínez Sánchez	3	6	3
(Japan) K Date-Krumm	7	3	3
(Ukraine) K Bondarenko	5	6	6
(Belarus) A Yakimova	4	6	6
(Luxembourg) M Minella	6	3	3
(Israel) S Pe'er	2	2
22	(Germany) J Görges	6	6
26	(Spain) A Medina Garrigues	3	6	6
(Romania) S Halep	6	1	2
Q	(Slovakia) J Čepelová	6	3	6
Q	(France) K Mladenovic	3	6	1
(Romania) I-C Begu	6^{3}	4
(Switzerland) R Oprandi	7^{7}	6
(United States) I Falconi	1	4
2	(Belarus) V Azarenka	6	6

Second round
14	(Serbia) A Ivanovic	6	7^{7}
(Ukraine) K Bondarenko	3	6^{3}
(Belarus) A Yakimova	6^{3}	2
22	(Germany) J Görges	7^{7}	6
26	(Spain) A Medina Garrigues	7^{9}	6^{5}	3
Q	(Slovakia) J Čepelová	6^{7}	7^{7}	6
(Switzerland) R Oprandi	2	0
2	(Belarus) V Azarenka	6	6

Third round
14	(Serbia) A Ivanovic	3	6	6
22	(Germany) J Görges	6	3	4
Q	(Slovakia) J Čepelová	3	3
2	(Belarus) V Azarenka	6	6

Fourth round
14	(Serbia) A Ivanovic	1	0
2	(Belarus) V Azarenka	6	6

== Championship match statistics ==
Category	(United States) S. Williams	(Poland) Radwańska
1st serve %	45/80 (56%)	72/99 (73%)
1st serve points won	37 of 45 = 82%	44 of 72 = 61%
2nd serve points won	17 of 35 = 49%	10 of 27 = 37%
Total service points won	54 of 80 = 67.50%	54 of 99 = 54.55%
Aces	17	2
Double faults	4	5
Winners	58	13
Unforced errors	36	14
Net points won	21 of 30 = 70%	10 of 17 = 59%
Break points converted	5 of 15 = 33%	2 of 2 = 100%
Return points won	45 of 99 = 45%	26 of 80 = 33%
Total points won	99	80

Preceded by 2012 French Open – Women's singles	Grand Slam women's singles	Succeeded by 2012 US Open – Women's singles
