= 2012 Wimbledon Championships – Men's doubles =

Men's doubles
- 2012 Wimbledon Championships

Final
- Champions: (United Kingdom) Jonathan Marray (Denmark) Frederik Nielsen
- Runners-up: (Sweden) Robert Lindstedt (Romania) Horia Tecău
- Score: 4–6, 6–4, 7–6^{(7–5)}, 6–7^{(5–7)}, 6–3

Details
- Draw: 64 (4 Q / 5 WC )
- Seeds: 16

Events
Singles	men	women		boys	girls
Doubles	men	women	mixed	boys	girls
WC Singles	men	women	quad
WC Doubles	men	women	quad
Legends	men	women	seniors
← 2011 ·	Wimbledon Championships	· 2013 →

Bob and Mike Bryan were the defending champions, but lost in the semifinals to Jonathan Marray and Frederik Nielsen.

Marray and Nielsen defeated Robert Lindstedt and Horia Tecău in the final, 4–6, 6–4, 7–6^{(7–5)}, 6–7^{(5–7)}, 6–3 to win the gentlemen's doubles title at the 2012 Wimbledon Championships. Marray became the first British player to win the men's doubles title at Wimbledon since Pat Hughes and Raymond Tuckey in 1936. At the time, Nielsen was only the second Danish winner of a Grand Slam title, following his own grandfather, Kurt Nielsen, who won the mixed doubles at the 1957 U.S. National Championships.

== Seeds ==
1. (Belarus) Max Mirnyi / (Canada) Daniel Nestor (second round)
2. (United States) Bob Bryan / (United States) Mike Bryan (semifinals)
3. (Poland) Mariusz Fyrstenberg / (Poland) Marcin Matkowski (first round)
4. (India) Leander Paes / (Czech Republic) Radek Štěpánek (third round)
5. (Sweden) Robert Lindstedt / (Romania) Horia Tecău (final)
6. (Austria) Alexander Peya / (Serbia) Nenad Zimonjić (first round)
7. (India) Mahesh Bhupathi / (India) Rohan Bopanna (second round)
8. (Pakistan) Aisam-ul-Haq Qureshi / (Netherlands) Jean-Julien Rojer (third round)
9. (Spain) Marcel Granollers / (Spain) Marc López (first round)
10. (Austria) Jürgen Melzer / (Germany) Philipp Petzschner (semifinals)
11. (Czech Republic) František Čermák / (Slovakia) Filip Polášek (first round)
12. (Mexico) Santiago González / (Germany) Christopher Kas (second round)
13. (United Kingdom) Colin Fleming / (United Kingdom) Ross Hutchins (first round)
14. (United States) Eric Butorac / (United Kingdom) Jamie Murray (second round)
15. (Croatia) Ivan Dodig / (Brazil) Marcelo Melo (quarterfinals)
16. (Brazil) André Sá / (Brazil) Bruno Soares (second round)

Click on the seed number of a player to go to their draw section.

== Draw ==
=== Key ===
- Q = Qualifier
- WC = Wild card
- LL = Lucky loser
- Alt = Alternate
- ITF = ITF entry
- PR = Protected ranking
- SR = Special ranking
- SE = Special exempt
- JE = Junior exempt
- JR = Junior Accelerator Programme entrant
- CO = College Accelerator Programme entrant
- NG = Next Gen Accelerator Program entrant
- w/o = Walkover
- r = Retired
- d = Defaulted

=== Finals ===
Quarterfinals
(Italy) Daniele Bracciali (Austria) Julian Knowle	4	2	4
5	(Sweden) Robert Lindstedt (Romania) Horia Tecău	6	6	6
15	(Croatia) Ivan Dodig (Brazil) Marcelo Melo	5	2	6	3
10	(Austria) Jürgen Melzer (Germany) Philipp Petzschner	7	6	3	6
WC	(United Kingdom) Jonathan Marray (Denmark) Frederik Nielsen	7^{7}	7^{7}	6^{3}	2	6
(United States) James Cerretani (France) Édouard Roger-Vasselin	6^{5}	6^{4}	7^{7}	6	2
(United States) Scott Lipsky (United States) Rajeev Ram	7	3	7	4	4
2	(United States) Bob Bryan (United States) Mike Bryan	5	6	5	6	6

Semifinals
5	(Sweden) Robert Lindstedt (Romania) Horia Tecău	6	6^{10}	6	6
10	(Austria) Jürgen Melzer (Germany) Philipp Petzschner	4	7^{12}	4	3
WC	(United Kingdom) Jonathan Marray (Denmark) Frederik Nielsen	6	7^{11}	6^{4}	7^{7}
2	(United States) Bob Bryan (United States) Mike Bryan	4	6^{9}	7^{7}	6^{5}

Final
5	(Sweden) Robert Lindstedt (Romania) Horia Tecău	6	4	6^{5}	7^{7}	3
WC	(United Kingdom) Jonathan Marray (Denmark) Frederik Nielsen	4	6	7^{7}	6^{5}	6

=== Top half ===
==== Section 1 ====
First round
1	(Belarus) M Mirnyi (Canada) D Nestor	4	6	6	6
(United States) M Russell (United States) D Young	6	0	2	1
(Australia) C Ball (Brazil) T Bellucci	5	6^{8}	3
(Italy) D Bracciali (Austria) J Knowle	7	7^{10}	6
(Argentina) JI Chela (Argentina) E Schwank	6	6	6
(Russia) A Bogomolov Jr. (Israel) D Sela	3	4	2
(France) J Benneteau (France) N Mahut	7^{7}	4	3	6^{5}
16	(Brazil) A Sá (Brazil) B Soares	6^{3}	6	6	7^{7}
12	(Mexico) S González (Germany) C Kas	7^{7}	4	6	6
WC	(United Kingdom) L Broady (United Kingdom) O Golding	6^{2}	6	3	4
(Belgium) S Darcis (Belgium) O Rochus	4	7	7^{7}	6
Q	(United Kingdom) L Burton (United Kingdom) G Morgan	6	5	6^{3}	4
(Ukraine) S Stakhovsky (Russia) D Tursunov	7^{7}	3	6	3	4
LL	(Thailand) Sa Ratiwatana (Thailand) So Ratiwatana	6^{3}	6	3	6	6
(Czech Republic) L Dlouhý (Slovakia) M Mertiňák	6^{7}	6^{5}	6^{4}
5	(Sweden) R Lindstedt (Romania) H Tecău	7^{9}	7^{7}	7^{7}

Second round
1	(Belarus) M Mirnyi (Canada) D Nestor	4	4	4
(Italy) D Bracciali (Austria) J Knowle	6	6	6
(Argentina) JI Chela (Argentina) E Schwank	6	6	6^{5}	4	6
16	(Brazil) A Sá (Brazil) B Soares	4	4	7^{7}	6	3
12	(Mexico) S González (Germany) C Kas	1	1	4
(Belgium) S Darcis (Belgium) O Rochus	6	6	6
LL	(Thailand) Sa Ratiwatana (Thailand) So Ratiwatana	2	6^{3}	6^{2}
5	(Sweden) R Lindstedt (Romania) H Tecău	6	7^{7}	7^{7}

Third round
(Italy) D Bracciali (Austria) J Knowle	7	7	6
(Argentina) JI Chela (Argentina) E Schwank	5	5	1
(Belgium) S Darcis (Belgium) O Rochus	4	5	6^{4}
5	(Sweden) R Lindstedt (Romania) H Tecău	6	7	7^{7}

Quarterfinals
(Italy) D Bracciali (Austria) J Knowle	4	2	4
5	(Sweden) R Lindstedt (Romania) H Tecău	6	6	6

==== Section 2 ====
First round
4	(India) L Paes (Czech Republic) R Štěpánek	6	6	6
LL	(Australia) C Ebelthite (Australia) J Peers	2	4	2
(Israel) J Erlich (Israel) A Ram	4	6	2	7^{8}	9
(Philippines) T Huey (United Kingdom) D Inglot	6	3	6	6^{6}	7
(Slovakia) M Kližan (Slovakia) L Lacko	7^{7}	4	6	6^{4}	5
(Germany) M Emmrich (Germany) M Kohlmann	6^{4}	6	4	7^{7}	7
(Australia) A Fisher (Australia) J Kerr	7^{7}	4	4	3
15	(Croatia) I Dodig (Brazil) M Melo	6^{4}	6	6	6
10	(Austria) J Melzer (Germany) P Petzschner	4	7^{7}	3	6	6
(Argentina) C Berlocq (Argentina) L Mayer	6	6^{0}	6	3	4
(Chinese Taipei) Y-h Lu (Germany) A Waske	7	3	6	6
(Belgium) X Malisse (Belgium) D Norman	5	6	3	4
(Russia) M Elgin (Uzbekistan) D Istomin	6	6	6
(Spain) P Andújar (Spain) G García López	4	3	2
(Uruguay) M Felder (Tunisia) M Jaziri	0	6^{1}	2
7	(India) M Bhupathi (India) R Bopanna	6	7^{7}	6

Second round
4	(India) L Paes (Czech Republic) R Štěpánek	6	6	7^{7}
(Israel) J Erlich (Israel) A Ram	2	4	6^{5}
(Germany) M Emmrich (Germany) M Kohlmann	3	6^{4}	3
15	(Croatia) I Dodig (Brazil) M Melo	6	7^{7}	6
10	(Austria) J Melzer (Germany) P Petzschner	6	6	6^{6}	6
(Chinese Taipei) Y-h Lu (Germany) A Waske	3	4	7^{8}	2
(Russia) M Elgin (Uzbekistan) D Istomin	7	7^{7}	6
7	(India) M Bhupathi (India) R Bopanna	5	6^{4}	3

Third round
4	(India) L Paes (Czech Republic) R Štěpánek	6	3	4	7^{7}	6
15	(Croatia) I Dodig (Brazil) M Melo	4	6	6	6^{2}	8
10	(Austria) J Melzer (Germany) P Petzschner	6	6	5	6^{9}	16
(Russia) M Elgin (Uzbekistan) D Istomin	4	4	7	7^{11}	14

Quarterfinals
15	(Croatia) I Dodig (Brazil) M Melo	5	2	6	3
10	(Austria) J Melzer (Germany) P Petzschner	7	6	3	6

=== Bottom half ===
==== Section 3 ====
First round
8	(Pakistan) A-u-H Qureshi (Netherlands) J-J Rojer	7^{7}	6	6
WC	(United Kingdom) J Goodall (United Kingdom) J Ward	6^{3}	2	4
(Italy) F Cipolla (Italy) F Fognini	5	6	1	7^{7}	3
Q	(United States) B Reynolds (South Africa) I van der Merwe	7	4	6	6^{5}	6
(Croatia) I Karlović (Germany) F Moser	3	6	6	7^{7}
(Australia) M Ebden (United States) R Harrison	6	3	4	6^{3}
WC	(United Kingdom) J Marray (Denmark) F Nielsen	6^{3}	6	7^{7}	2	7
9	(Spain) M Granollers (Spain) M López	7^{7}	4	6^{4}	6	5
13	(United Kingdom) C Fleming (United Kingdom) R Hutchins	6	6	2	6^{5}	3
(Kazakhstan) M Kukushkin (Czech Republic) L Rosol	3	4	6	7^{7}	6
(United States) J Cerretani (France) É Roger-Vasselin	6	7^{7}	7^{9}
(Italy) P Lorenzi (France) B Paire	4	6^{4}	6^{7}
(United States) J Blake (United States) S Querrey	6	3	6	3	2
(Spain) D Marrero (Italy) A Seppi	3	6	3	6	6
(Sweden) J Brunström (Germany) P Marx	6	6	6^{1}	7^{7}
3	(Poland) M Fyrstenberg (Poland) M Matkowski	4	2	7^{7}	6^{2}

Second round
8	(Pakistan) A-u-H Qureshi (Netherlands) J-J Rojer	6	6^{5}	6	6
Q	(United States) B Reynolds (South Africa) I van der Merwe	3	7^{7}	4	4
(Croatia) I Karlović (Germany) F Moser	3	3	2
WC	(United Kingdom) J Marray (Denmark) F Nielsen	6	6	6
(Kazakhstan) M Kukushkin (Czech Republic) L Rosol	4	6	6	3	4
(United States) J Cerretani (France) É Roger-Vasselin	6	2	3	6	6
(Spain) D Marrero (Italy) A Seppi	7^{7}	6	7
(Sweden) J Brunström (Germany) P Marx	6^{3}	4	5

Third round
8	(Pakistan) A-u-H Qureshi (Netherlands) J-J Rojer	6^{5}	6^{4}	7^{7}	7	5
WC	(United Kingdom) J Marray (Denmark) F Nielsen	7^{7}	7^{7}	6^{4}	5	7
(United States) J Cerretani (France) É Roger-Vasselin	6	6	3	6^{10}	6
(Spain) D Marrero (Italy) A Seppi	4	4	6	7^{12}	4

Quarterfinals
WC	(United Kingdom) J Marray (Denmark) F Nielsen	7^{7}	7^{7}	6^{3}	2	6
(United States) J Cerretani (France) É Roger-Vasselin	6^{5}	6^{4}	7^{7}	6	2

==== Section 4 ====
First round
6	(Austria) A Peya (Serbia) N Zimonjić	6^{3}	6^{3}	6	6^{3}
WC	(Australia) C Guccione (Australia) L Hewitt	7^{7}	7^{7}	3	7^{7}
(Germany) B Becker (Germany) C-M Stebe	6	1	6	6
(Colombia) JS Cabal (Colombia) R Farah	3	6	3	4
(Australia) P Hanley (The Bahamas) M Knowles	6	4	6	4	5
(United States) S Lipsky (United States) R Ram	3	6	3	6	7
(Germany) D Brown (Austria) O Marach	6	6	1	2	7
11	(Czech Republic) F Čermák (Slovakia) F Polášek	2	2	6	6	5
14	(United States) E Butorac (United Kingdom) J Murray	7^{7}	7^{7}	4	7^{7}
Q	(Germany) A Begemann (Slovakia) I Zelenay	6^{5}	6^{3}	6	6^{4}
(France) A Clément (France) M Llodra	6	6	6^{4}	6
(Spain) R Ramírez Hidalgo (Spain) A Ramos Viñolas	2	2	7^{7}	0
WC	(United Kingdom) J Delgado (United Kingdom) K Skupski	6	5	6	6
Q	(Germany) M Bachinger (Germany) T Kamke	3	7	3	4
(Netherlands) R Haase (Finland) J Nieminen	3	2	4
2	(United States) B Bryan (United States) M Bryan	6	6	6

Second round
WC	(Australia) C Guccione (Australia) L Hewitt	6	5	4	6	9
(Germany) B Becker (Germany) C-M Stebe	4	7	6	2	7
(United States) S Lipsky (United States) R Ram	7	4	4	6	6
(Germany) D Brown (Austria) O Marach	5	6	6	3	4
14	(United States) E Butorac (United Kingdom) J Murray	3	5	4
(France) A Clément (France) M Llodra	6	7	6
WC	(United Kingdom) J Delgado (United Kingdom) K Skupski	6^{2}	0	2
2	(United States) B Bryan (United States) M Bryan	7^{7}	6	6

Third round
WC	(Australia) C Guccione (Australia) L Hewitt	4	6	4	4
(United States) S Lipsky (United States) R Ram	6	3	6	6
(France) A Clément (France) M Llodra	6^{5}	4	6	6	2
2	(United States) B Bryan (United States) M Bryan	7^{7}	6	3	4	6

Quarterfinals
(United States) S Lipsky (United States) R Ram	7	3	7	4	4
2	(United States) B Bryan (United States) M Bryan	5	6	5	6	6
