= 2012 Wimbledon Championships =

- Date: 25 June – 8 July
- Edition: 126th
- Category: Grand Slam (ITF)
- Draw: 128S / 64D / 48XD
- Prize money: £16,060,000
- Surface: Grass
- Location: Church Road; SW19, Wimbledon, London, United Kingdom
- Venue: All England Lawn Tennis and Croquet Club
- Attendance: 484,805

Champions

Men's singles
- (Switzerland) Roger Federer

Women's singles
- (United States) Serena Williams

Men's doubles
- (United Kingdom) Jonathan Marray / (Denmark) Frederik Nielsen

Women's doubles
- (United States) Serena Williams / (United States) Venus Williams

Mixed doubles
- (United States) Mike Bryan / (United States) Lisa Raymond

Wheelchair men's doubles
- (Netherlands) Tom Egberink / (France) Michaël Jérémiasz

Wheelchair women's doubles
- (Netherlands) Jiske Griffioen / (Netherlands) Aniek van Koot

Boys' singles
- (Canada) Filip Peliwo

Girls' singles
- (Canada) Eugenie Bouchard

Boys' doubles
- (Australia) Andrew Harris / (Australia) Nick Kyrgios

Girls' doubles
- (Canada) Eugenie Bouchard / (United States) Taylor Townsend

Gentlemen's invitation doubles
- (United Kingdom) Greg Rusedski / (France) Fabrice Santoro

Ladies' invitation doubles
- (United States) Lindsay Davenport / (Switzerland) Martina Hingis

Senior gentlemen's invitation doubles
- (Australia) Pat Cash / (Australia) Mark Woodforde
- Wimbledon Championships

The 2012 Wimbledon Championships was a tennis tournament played on grass courts at the All England Lawn Tennis and Croquet Club in Wimbledon, London in the United Kingdom. It was the 126th edition of the Wimbledon Championships and was held from 25 June to 8 July 2012. It was the third Grand Slam tennis event of the year and was part of the ATP World Tour, the WTA Tour, the ITF Junior Tour and the NEC Tour. The championships were organised by the All England Lawn Tennis and Croquet Club and the International Tennis Federation.

Novak Djokovic and Petra Kvitová were unsuccessful in their 2011 title defences, both defeated by the eventual champions, he by Roger Federer in the semifinals and she by Serena Williams in the quarterfinals. In four sets, Federer defeated Andy Murray in the final to win a record-equalling seventh Wimbledon title, while Murray became the first British male player to reach a Wimbledon singles final in the Open era. Serena Williams defeated first-time Wimbledon finalist Agnieszka Radwańska in three sets to equal her sister Venus in winning five Wimbledon titles. Federer and Williams were each more than 30 years old at the time of their victories.

With his win, Federer reclaimed the World No. 1 ranking for the first time since June 2010, thus allowing him to equal, then to break, the all-time record of most weeks ranked at World No. 1 held by Pete Sampras. Agnieszka Radwańska, Victoria Azarenka, and Maria Sharapova were in contention for the world number 1 ranking. Since Sharapova lost in the fourth round and Radwańska was a match away from becoming the world number 1 but lost it, Azarenka continued her success as the number 1.

Twenty days after the Championships concluded, Wimbledon held the 2012 Olympic tennis tournament.

== Events ==
- On 28 June, World No. 100 Lukáš Rosol upset World No. 2 and two-time Wimbledon champion Rafael Nadal in five sets.
- On 30 June:
  - Marin Čilić beat Sam Querrey, 7–6^{(8–6)}, 6–4, 6–7^{(2–7)}, 6–7^{(3–7)}, 17–15. At 5 hours and 31 minutes, it was then the second longest match in Wimbledon history. This would later be surpassed by the 2018 semifinal match between Kevin Anderson and John Isner.
  - Yaroslava Shvedova became the first player in a Grand Slam tournament to win a golden set, beating 2012 French Open finalist Sara Errani, 6–0, 6–4.
  - Andy Murray and Marcos Baghdatis finished play at 23:02, the latest-ever finish to a match at Wimbledon.
- On 5 July, Agnieszka Radwańska became the first Pole, male or female, to reach a Grand Slam singles final in the Open era.
- On 6 July, Murray became the first British man in 74 years to reach the singles final, defeating Jo-Wilfried Tsonga in the semifinal.
- On 7 July:
  - Serena Williams won her fifth Wimbledon title, tying her sister Venus in doing so.
  - Jonathan Marray and Frederik Nielsen became the first wild card to win the gentlemen's doubles title, beating both of the previous year's finalists along the way. Marray also became the first British player to win the men's doubles title in the Open era.
- On 8 July, Roger Federer achieved a record-tying seventh singles title at Wimbledon, tied with Pete Sampras (Open Era) and William Renshaw (Amateur Era).

== Point and prize money distribution ==
=== Point distribution ===
Below are the tables with the point distribution for each discipline of the tournament.

==== Senior points ====
Event	W	F	SF	QF	Round of 16	Round of 32	Round of 64	Round of 128	Q	Q3	Q2	Q1
Men's singles	2000	1200	720	360	180	90	45	10	25	16	8	0
Men's doubles	2000	1200	720	360	180	90	0	—N/a	25	—N/a	0	0
Women's singles	2000	1400	900	500	280	160	100	5	60	50	40	2
Women's doubles	2000	1400	900	500	280	160	5	—N/a	48	—N/a	0	0

==== Wheelchair points ====
Event	W	F	3rd	4th
Doubles	800	500	375	100

==== Junior points ====
Event	W	F	SF	QF	Round of 16	Round of 32	Q	Q3
Boys' singles	250	180	120	80	50	30	25	20
Girls' singles	250	180	120	80	50	30	25	20
Boys' doubles	180	120	80	50	30	—N/a	—N/a	—N/a
Girls' doubles	180	120	80	50	30	—N/a	—N/a	—N/a

=== Prize money ===
For 2012, the prize money purse was increased to £16,060,000 from £14,600,000 in 2011. The winner of the men's and women's singles title earned £1,150,000.

Event	W	F	SF	QF	Round of 16	Round of 32	Round of 64	Round of 128	Q3	Q2	Q1
Singles	£1,150,000	£575,000	£287,500	£145,000	£75,000	£38,875	£23,125	£14,500	£8,500	£4,250	£2,125
Doubles*	£260,000	£130,000	£65,000	£32,500	£16,650	£9,350	£5,450	—N/a	—N/a	—N/a	—N/a
Mixed doubles*	£92,000	£46,000	£23,000	£10,500	£5,200	£2,600	£1,300	—N/a	—N/a	—N/a	—N/a
Wheelchair doubles*	£8,000	£4,500	£2,750	£1,750	—N/a	—N/a	—N/a	—N/a	—N/a	—N/a	—N/a
Invitation doubles	£19,000	£16,000	£13,000	£12,000	£11,000	—N/a	—N/a	—N/a	—N/a	—N/a	—N/a

_{* per team}

== Singles players ==
Men's singles

Champion		Runner-up	
(Switzerland) Roger Federer [3]		(United Kingdom) Andy Murray [4]	
Semifinals out
(Serbia) Novak Djokovic [1]		(France) Jo-Wilfried Tsonga [5]	
Quarterfinals out
(Germany) Florian Mayer [31]	(Russia) Mikhail Youzhny [26]	(Spain) David Ferrer [7]	(Germany) Philipp Kohlschreiber [27]
4th round out
(Serbia) Viktor Troicki	(France) Richard Gasquet [18]	(Belgium) Xavier Malisse	(Uzbekistan) Denis Istomin
(Argentina) Juan Martín del Potro [9]	(Croatia) Marin Čilić [16]	(United States) Mardy Fish [10]	(United States) Brian Baker (Q)
3rd round out
(Czech Republic) Radek Štěpánek [28]	(Argentina) Juan Mónaco [15]	(Spain) Nicolás Almagro [12]	(Poland) Jerzy Janowicz (Q)
(France) Julien Benneteau [29]	(Spain) Fernando Verdasco [17]	(Colombia) Alejandro Falla	(Serbia) Janko Tipsarević [8]
(United States) Andy Roddick [30]	(Japan) Kei Nishikori [19]	(United States) Sam Querrey	(Cyprus) Marcos Baghdatis
(Slovakia) Lukáš Lacko	(Belgium) David Goffin (WC)	(France) Benoît Paire	(Czech Republic) Lukáš Rosol
2nd round out
(United States) Ryan Harrison	(Germany) Benjamin Becker (PR)	(Slovakia) Martin Kližan	(France) Jérémy Chardy
(France) Guillaume Rufin (Q)	(Belgium) Ruben Bemelmans (Q)	(Germany) Philipp Petzschner	(Latvia) Ernests Gulbis
(Italy) Fabio Fognini	(United States) Michael Russell (Q)	(Slovenia) Grega Žemlja (WC)	(France) Gilles Simon [13]
(France) Nicolas Mahut	(Russia) Igor Andreev	(Spain) Íñigo Cervantes (Q)	(United States) Ryan Sweeting (Q)
(France) Kenny de Schepper (Q)	(Germany) Björn Phau	(France) Florent Serra (Q)	(Japan) Go Soeda
(Poland) Łukasz Kubot	(Canada) Milos Raonic [21]	(Bulgaria) Grigor Dimitrov	(Croatia) Ivo Karlović
(Spain) Guillermo García López	(Austria) Jürgen Melzer	(United States) Jesse Levine (Q)	(United Kingdom) James Ward
(Finland) Jarkko Nieminen	(Ukraine) Alexandr Dolgopolov [22]	(Tunisia) Malek Jaziri	(Spain) Rafael Nadal [2]
1st round out
(Spain) Juan Carlos Ferrero	(Chinese Taipei) Lu Yen-hsun	(United States) James Blake	(Ukraine) Sergiy Stakhovsky
(Spain) Marcel Granollers [24]	(Argentina) Juan Ignacio Chela	(Italy) Filippo Volandri	(Argentina) Leonardo Mayer
(Belgium) Olivier Rochus	(Belgium) Steve Darcis	(Argentina) Carlos Berlocq	(Germany) Tobias Kamke
(Russia) Dmitry Tursunov	(Slovenia) Blaz Kavčič	(Italy) Simone Bolelli (Q)	(Czech Republic) Tomáš Berdych [6]
(Spain) Albert Ramos Viñolas	(France) Michaël Llodra	(Spain) Adrián Menéndez Maceiras (Q)	(Luxembourg) Gilles Müller
(Chinese Taipei) Jimmy Wang (Q)	(United Kingdom) Josh Goodall (WC)	(Australia) Marinko Matosevic	(France) Paul-Henri Mathieu
(United States) John Isner [11]	(Italy) Paolo Lorenzi	(United Kingdom) Oliver Golding (WC)	(Italy) Andreas Seppi [23]
(United States) Donald Young	(Italy) Flavio Cipolla	(Italy) Potito Starace	(Argentina) David Nalbandian
(Germany) Dustin Brown	(Germany) Matthias Bachinger	(United States) Wayne Odesnik (LL)	(United Kingdom) Jamie Baker (WC)
(Kazakhstan) Mikhail Kukushkin	(Russia) Andrey Kuznetsov	(Russia) Igor Kunitsyn	(Netherlands) Robin Haase
(Germany) Cedrik-Marcel Stebe	(Japan) Tatsuma Ito	(Canada) Vasek Pospisil	(Colombia) Santiago Giraldo
(South Africa) Kevin Anderson [32]	(Spain) Albert Montañés	(Israel) Dudi Sela	(Russia) Nikolay Davydenko
(Australia) Lleyton Hewitt (WC)	(France) Édouard Roger-Vasselin	(Romania) Adrian Ungur	(Switzerland) Stan Wawrinka [25]
(Australia) Bernard Tomic [20]	(Slovakia) Karol Beck	(Spain) Pablo Andújar	(Spain) Rubén Ramírez Hidalgo
(Spain) Feliciano López [14]	(Portugal) Rui Machado	(Australia) Matthew Ebden	(Russia) Alex Bogomolov Jr.
(Germany) Tommy Haas (WC)	(Estonia) Jürgen Zopp (Q)	(Croatia) Ivan Dodig	(Brazil) Thomaz Bellucci

Women's singles

Champion		Runner-up	
(United States) Serena Williams [6]		(Poland) Agnieszka Radwańska [3]	
Semifinals out
(Germany) Angelique Kerber [8]		(Belarus) Victoria Azarenka [2]	
Quarterfinals out
(Germany) Sabine Lisicki [15]	(Russia) Maria Kirilenko [17]	(Czech Republic) Petra Kvitová [4]	(Austria) Tamira Paszek
4th round out
(Russia) Maria Sharapova [1]	(Belgium) Kim Clijsters	(Italy) Camila Giorgi (Q)	(China) Peng Shuai [30]
(Kazakhstan) Yaroslava Shvedova (WC)	(Italy) Francesca Schiavone [24]	(Italy) Roberta Vinci [21]	(Serbia) Ana Ivanovic [14]
3rd round out
(Chinese Taipei) Hsieh Su-wei	(United States) Sloane Stephens	(Russia) Vera Zvonareva [12]	(United States) Christina McHale [28]
(United Kingdom) Heather Watson	(Russia) Nadia Petrova [20]	(Romania) Sorana Cîrstea	(Netherlands) Arantxa Rus
(China) Zheng Jie [25]	(Italy) Sara Errani [10]	(Czech Republic) Klára Zakopalová	(United States) Varvara Lepchenko
(Belgium) Yanina Wickmayer	(Croatia) Mirjana Lučić (Q)	(Germany) Julia Görges [22]	(Slovakia) Jana Čepelová (Q)
2nd round out
(Bulgaria) Tsvetana Pironkova	(France) Stéphanie Foretz Gacon	(Czech Republic) Petra Cetkovská [23]	(Serbia) Bojana Jovanovski
(Spain) Sílvia Soler Espinosa	(Czech Republic) Andrea Hlaváčková	(France) Mathilde Johansson	(Russia) Ekaterina Makarova
(Russia) Elena Vesnina	(United States) Jamie Hampton	(Hungary) Tímea Babos	(Georgia (country)) Anna Tatishvili
(China) Li Na [11]	(Spain) Lourdes Domínguez Lino	(Japan) Ayumi Morita	(Australia) Samantha Stosur [5]
(Hungary) Melinda Czink (Q)	(Canada) Aleksandra Wozniak	(Netherlands) Kiki Bertens	(United Kingdom) Anne Keothavong
(Belarus) Olga Govortsova	(Czech Republic) Kristýna Plíšková (Q)	(Russia) Anastasia Pavlyuchenkova [31]	(United Kingdom) Elena Baltacha
(France) Alizé Cornet	(Kazakhstan) Galina Voskoboeva	(New Zealand) Marina Erakovic	(France) Marion Bartoli [9]
(Ukraine) Kateryna Bondarenko	(Belarus) Anastasiya Yakimova	(Spain) Anabel Medina Garrigues [26]	(Switzerland) Romina Oprandi
1st round out
(Australia) Anastasia Rodionova	(Serbia) Vesna Dolonc (Q)	(France) Virginie Razzano (WC)	(Romania) Monica Niculescu [29]
(United States) Vania King	(Czech Republic) Karolína Plíšková (Q)	(Greece) Eleni Daniilidou	(Croatia) Petra Martić
(Germany) Mona Barthel	(Romania) Edina Gallovits-Hall	(Chinese Taipei) Chang Kai-chen	(Serbia) Jelena Janković [18]
(United Kingdom) Johanna Konta (WC)	(Ukraine) Lesia Tsurenko	(Italy) Alberta Brianti	(Czech Republic) Lucie Hradecká
(Slovakia) Magdaléna Rybáriková	(United States) Venus Williams	(Czech Republic) Iveta Benešová	(Slovakia) Daniela Hantuchová [27]
(Italy) Maria Elena Camerin (Q)	(United States) Melanie Oudin (WC)	(Thailand) Tamarine Tanasugarn	(Italy) Flavia Pennetta [16]
(Kazakhstan) Ksenia Pervak	(France) Pauline Parmentier	(United Kingdom) Naomi Broady (WC)	(Romania) Alexandra Cadanțu
(Poland) Sandra Zaniewska (Q)	(Australia) Jarmila Gajdošová	(Japan) Misaki Doi (LL)	(Spain) Carla Suárez Navarro
(Czech Republic) Barbora Záhlavová-Strýcová	(Sweden) Johanna Larsson	(Russia) Vera Dushevina	(Canada) Stéphanie Dubois
(Czech Republic) Lucie Šafářová [19]	(South Africa) Chanelle Scheepers	(Spain) Laura Pous Tió	(United States) CoCo Vandeweghe (Q)
(Slovakia) Dominika Cibulková [13]	(Germany) Annika Beck (Q)	(Slovenia) Polona Hercog	(United Kingdom) Laura Robson (WC)
(Sweden) Sofia Arvidsson	(Austria) Patricia Mayr-Achleitner	(Italy) Karin Knapp	(Uzbekistan) Akgul Amanmuradova
(Denmark) Caroline Wozniacki [7]	(Russia) Nina Bratchikova	(Hungary) Gréta Arn	(Russia) Svetlana Kuznetsova [32]
(Australia) Ashleigh Barty (WC)	(Poland) Urszula Radwańska	(Russia) Alexandra Panova	(Australia) Casey Dellacqua
(Spain) María José Martínez Sánchez	(Japan) Kimiko Date-Krumm	(Luxembourg) Mandy Minella	(Israel) Shahar Pe'er
(Romania) Simona Halep	(France) Kristina Mladenovic (Q)	(Romania) Irina-Camelia Begu	(United States) Irina Falconi

== Champions ==
=== Seniors ===
==== Men's singles ====
(Switzerland) Roger Federer def. (United Kingdom) Andy Murray, 4–6, 7–5, 6–3, 6–4

- It was Federer's 5th title of the year and 1st Grand Slam title of the year. It was his 7th Wimbledon title, 17th Grand Slam title, and 75th career title.

==== Women's singles ====
(United States) Serena Williams def. (Poland) Agnieszka Radwańska, 6–1, 5–7, 6–2

- It was Williams' 3rd title of the year and 1st Grand Slam title of the year. It was her 5th Wimbledon title, 14th Grand Slam title, and 42nd career title.

==== Men's doubles ====
(United Kingdom) Jonathan Marray / (Denmark) Frederik Nielsen def. (Sweden) Robert Lindstedt / (Romania) Horia Tecău, 4–6, 6–4, 7–6^{(7–5)}, 6–7^{(5–7)}, 6–3

==== Women's doubles ====
(United States) Serena Williams / (United States) Venus Williams def. (Czech Republic) Andrea Hlaváčková / (Czech Republic) Lucie Hradecká, 7–5, 6–4

- This was the Williams sisters' 13th Grand Slam title.

==== Mixed doubles ====
(United States) Mike Bryan / (United States) Lisa Raymond def. (India) Leander Paes / (Russia) Elena Vesnina, 6–3, 5–7, 6–4

=== Juniors ===
==== Boys' singles ====
(Canada) Filip Peliwo def. (Australia) Luke Saville, 7–5, 6–4

==== Girls' singles ====
(Canada) Eugenie Bouchard def. (Ukraine) Elina Svitolina, 6–2, 6–2

==== Boys' doubles ====
(Australia) Andrew Harris / (Australia) Nick Kyrgios def. (Italy) Matteo Donati / (Italy) Pietro Licciardi, 6–2, 6–4

==== Girls' doubles ====
(Canada) Eugenie Bouchard / (United States) Taylor Townsend def. (Switzerland) Belinda Bencic / (Croatia) Ana Konjuh, 6–4, 6–3

=== Invitation ===
==== Gentlemen's invitation doubles ====
(United Kingdom) Greg Rusedski / (France) Fabrice Santoro def. (Sweden) Thomas Enqvist / (Australia) Mark Philippoussis, 6–7^{(3–7)}, 6–4, [11–9]

==== Ladies' invitation doubles ====
(United States) Lindsay Davenport / (Switzerland) Martina Hingis def. (United States) Martina Navratilova / (Czech Republic) Jana Novotná, 6–3, 6–2

==== Senior gentlemen's invitation doubles ====
(Australia) Pat Cash / (Australia) Mark Woodforde def. (United Kingdom) Jeremy Bates / (Sweden) Anders Järryd, 6–3, 6–4

=== Wheelchair ===
==== Wheelchair men's doubles ====
(Netherlands) Tom Egberink / (France) Michaël Jérémiasz def. (Netherlands) Robin Ammerlaan / (Netherlands) Ronald Vink, 6–4, 6–2

==== Wheelchair women's doubles ====
(Netherlands) Jiske Griffioen / (Netherlands) Aniek van Koot def. (United Kingdom) Lucy Shuker / (United Kingdom) Jordanne Whiley, 6–1, 6–2

== Singles seeds ==
The following are the seeded players and notable players who withdrew from the event. Seedings based on ATP and WTA rankings are as of 18 June 2012, Rankings and Points are as of 25 June 2012.

=== Men's singles ===
Because the tournament takes place one week later than in 2011, points defending includes results from both the 2011 Wimbledon and tournaments from the week of 4 July 2011 (Newport and Davis Cup).

The Men's singles seeds is arranged on a surface-based system to reflect more accurately the individual player's grass court achievement as per the following formula:

- ATP Entry System Position points as at a week before The Championships
- Add 100% points earned for all grass court tournaments in the past 12 months
- add 75% points earned for best grass court tournament in the 12 months before that.

Seed	Rank	Player	Points before	Points defending	Points won	Points after	Status
1	1	(Serbia) Novak Djokovic	12,280	2,000	720	11,000	Semifinals lost to (Switzerland) Roger Federer [3]
2	2	(Spain) Rafael Nadal	10,060	1,200	45	8,905	Second round lost to (Czech Republic) Lukáš Rosol
3	3	(Switzerland) Roger Federer	9,435	360	2,000	11,075	Champion, defeated (United Kingdom) Andy Murray [4]
4	4	(United Kingdom) Andy Murray	6,980	720	1,200	7,460	Runner-up, lost to (Switzerland) Roger Federer [3]
5	6	(France) Jo-Wilfried Tsonga	5,230	720	720	5,230	Semifinals lost to (United Kingdom) Andy Murray [4]
6	7	(Czech Republic) Tomáš Berdych	4,685	180	10	4,515	First round lost to (Latvia) Ernests Gulbis
7	5	(Spain) David Ferrer	5,250	180	360	5,430	Quarterfinals lost to (United Kingdom) Andy Murray [4]
8	8	(Serbia) Janko Tipsarević	3,200	10	90	3,280	Third round lost to (Russia) Mikhail Youzhny [26]
9	9	(Argentina) Juan Martín del Potro	3,180	180	180	3,180	Fourth round lost to (Spain) David Ferrer [7]
10	12	(United States) Mardy Fish	2,535	360	180	2,355	Fourth round lost to (France) Jo-Wilfried Tsonga [5]
11	10	(United States) John Isner	2,655	45+250	10+150	2,520	First round lost to (Colombia) Alejandro Falla
12	11	(Spain) Nicolás Almagro	2,605	90	90	2,605	Third round lost to (France) Richard Gasquet [18]
13	13	(France) Gilles Simon	2,525	90	45	2,480	Second round lost to (Belgium) Xavier Malisse
14	17	(Spain) Feliciano López	1,725	360	10	1,375	First round lost to (Finland) Jarkko Nieminen
15	14	(Argentina) Juan Mónaco	2,115	10	90	2,195	Third round lost to (Serbia) Viktor Troicki
16	18	(Croatia) Marin Čilić	1,655	10	180	1,825	Fourth round lost to (United Kingdom) Andy Murray [4]
17	16	(Spain) Fernando Verdasco	1,765	45	90	1,810	Third round lost to (Belgium) Xavier Malisse
18	19	(France) Richard Gasquet	1,600	180	180	1,600	Fourth round lost to (Germany) Florian Mayer [31]
19	20	(Japan) Kei Nishikori	1,600	10	90	1,680	Third round lost to (Argentina) Juan Martín del Potro [9]
20	28	(Australia) Bernard Tomic	1,255	385	10	880	First round lost to (Belgium) David Goffin [WC]
21	22	(Canada) Milos Raonic	1,540	45	45	1,540	Second round lost to (United States) Sam Querrey
22	21	(Ukraine) Alexandr Dolgopolov	1,585	10	45	1,620	Second round lost to (France) Benoît Paire
23	26	(Italy) Andreas Seppi	1,390	45	10	1,355	First round lost to (Uzbekistan) Denis Istomin
24	23	(Spain) Marcel Granollers	1,530	10	10	1,530	First round lost to (Serbia) Viktor Troicki
25	24	(Switzerland) Stan Wawrinka	1,505	45	10	1,470	First round lost to (Austria) Jürgen Melzer
26	33	(Russia) Mikhail Youzhny	1,210	180	360	1,390	Quarterfinals lost to (Switzerland) Roger Federer [3]
27	30	(Germany) Philipp Kohlschreiber	1,220	10	360	1,570	Quarterfinals lost to (France) Jo-Wilfried Tsonga [5]
28	27	(Czech Republic) Radek Štěpánek	1,340	10	90	1,420	Third round lost to (Serbia) Novak Djokovic [1]
29	32	(France) Julien Benneteau	1,210	45	90	1,255	Third round lost to (Switzerland) Roger Federer [3]
30	25	(United States) Andy Roddick	1,395	90	90	1,395	Third round lost to (Spain) David Ferrer [7]
31	29	(Germany) Florian Mayer	1,230	45	360	1,545	Quarterfinals lost to (Serbia) Novak Djokovic [1]
32	31	(South Africa) Kevin Anderson	1,215	45	10	1,180	First round lost to (Bulgaria) Grigor Dimitrov

The following player would have been seeded, but he withdrew from the event.

Rank	Player	Points before	Points defending	Points after	Withdrawal reason
15	(France) Gaël Monfils	1,805	90	1,715	Right knee injury

=== Women's singles ===
Because the tournament takes place one week later than in 2011, points defending includes results from both the 2011 Wimbledon and tournaments from the week of 4 July 2011 (Budapest and Båstad).

For the Women's singles seeds, the seeding order follows the ranking list, except where in the opinion of the committee, the grass court credentials of a particular player necessitates a change in the interest of achieving a balanced draw.

Seed	Rank	Player	Points before	Points defending	Points won	Points after	Status
1	1	(Russia) Maria Sharapova	9,490	1,400	280	8,370	Fourth round lost to (Germany) Sabine Lisicki [15]
2	2	(Belarus) Victoria Azarenka	8,800	900	900	8,800	Semifinals lost to (United States) Serena Williams [6]
3	3	(Poland) Agnieszka Radwańska	7,230	100	1,400	8,530	Runner-up, lost to (United States) Serena Williams [6]
4	4	(Czech Republic) Petra Kvitová	6,775	2,000	500	5,275	Quarterfinals lost to (United States) Serena Williams [6]
5	5	(Australia) Samantha Stosur	6,100	5	100	6,195	Second round lost to (Netherlands) Arantxa Rus
6	6	(United States) Serena Williams	5,640	280	2,000	7,360	Champion, defeated (Poland) Agnieszka Radwańska [3]
7	7	(Denmark) Caroline Wozniacki	4,366	280+30	5+30	4,091	First round lost to (Austria) Tamira Paszek
8	8	(Germany) Angelique Kerber	4,275	5+30	900+30	5,170	Semifinals lost to (Poland) Agnieszka Radwańska [3]
9	9	(France) Marion Bartoli	3,800	500	100	3,400	Second round lost to (Croatia) Mirjana Lučić [Q]
10	10	(Italy) Sara Errani	3,350	100+70	160+70	3,410	Third round lost to (Kazakhstan) Yaroslava Shvedova [WC]
11	11	(China) Li Na	3,245	100	100	3,245	Second round lost to (Romania) Sorana Cîrstea
12	12	(Russia) Vera Zvonareva	3,160	160	160	3,160	Third round lost to (Belgium) Kim Clijsters
13	13	(Slovakia) Dominika Cibulková	3,120	500	5	2,625	First round lost to (Czech Republic) Klára Zakopalová
14	14	(Serbia) Ana Ivanovic	3,070	160	280	3,190	Fourth round lost to (Belarus) Victoria Azarenka [2]
15	15	(Germany) Sabine Lisicki	2,697	900	500	2,297	Quarterfinals lost to (Germany) Angelique Kerber [8]
16	17	(Italy) Flavia Pennetta	2,470	160+70	5+60	2,305	First round lost to (Italy) Camila Giorgi [Q]
17	19	(Russia) Maria Kirilenko	2,295	160	500	2,635	Quarterfinals lost to (Poland) Agnieszka Radwańska [3]
18	22	(Serbia) Jelena Janković	2,220	5	5	2,220	First round lost to (Belgium) Kim Clijsters
19	21	(Czech Republic) Lucie Šafářová	2,135	100	5	2,040	First round lost to (Netherlands) Kiki Bertens
20	20	(Russia) Nadia Petrova	2,225	280	160	2,105	Third round lost to (Italy) Camila Giorgi [Q]
21	23	(Italy) Roberta Vinci	1,965	160+280	280+60	1,865	Fourth round lost to (Austria) Tamira Paszek
22	24	(Germany) Julia Görges	1,945	160	160	1,945	Third round lost to (Serbia) Ana Ivanovic [14]
23	25	(Czech Republic) Petra Cetkovská	1,945	280	100	1,765	Second round lost to (United States) Sloane Stephens
24	26	(Italy) Francesca Schiavone	1,930	160	280	2,050	Fourth round lost to (Czech Republic) Petra Kvitová [4]
25	27	(China) Zheng Jie	1,850	100	160	1,910	Third round lost to (United States) Serena Williams [6]
26	28	(Spain) Anabel Medina Garrigues	1,835	5+130	100+70	1,870	Second round lost to (Slovakia) Jana Čepelová [Q]
27	29	(Slovakia) Daniela Hantuchová	1,820	160	5	1,665	First round lost to (United States) Jamie Hampton
28	32	(United States) Christina McHale	1,750	100	160	1,810	Third round lost to (Germany) Angelique Kerber [8]
29	33	(Romania) Monica Niculescu	1,735	100	5	1,640	First round lost to (France) Stéphanie Foretz Gacon
30	34	(China) Peng Shuai	1,730	280	280	1,730	Fourth round lost to (Russia) Maria Kirilenko [17]
31	30	(Russia) Anastasia Pavlyuchenkova	1,800	100	100	1,800	Second round lost to (United States) Varvara Lepchenko
32	35	(Russia) Svetlana Kuznetsova	1,642	160	5	1,487	First round lost to (Belgium) Yanina Wickmayer

The following players would have been seeded, but they withdrew from the event.

Rank	Player	Points before	Points defending	Points after	Withdrawal reason
16	(Estonia) Kaia Kanepi	2,519	5	2,514	Heel injury
18	(Germany) Andrea Petkovic	2,420	160	2,260	Right ankle injury

== Main draw wild card entries ==
The following players received wild cards into the main draw senior events.

=== Men's singles ===
1. (United Kingdom) Jamie Baker
2. (Belgium) David Goffin
3. (United Kingdom) Oliver Golding
4. (United Kingdom) Josh Goodall
5. (Germany) Tommy Haas
6. (Australia) Lleyton Hewitt
7. (United Kingdom) James Ward
8. (Slovenia) Grega Žemlja

=== Women's singles ===
1. (Australia) Ashleigh Barty
2. (United Kingdom) Naomi Broady
3. (United Kingdom) Johanna Konta
4. (United States) Melanie Oudin
5. (France) Virginie Razzano
6. (United Kingdom) Laura Robson
7. (Kazakhstan) Yaroslava Shvedova

=== Men's doubles ===
1. (United Kingdom) Liam Broady / (United Kingdom) Oliver Golding
2. (United Kingdom) Jamie Delgado / (United Kingdom) Ken Skupski
3. (Australia) Chris Guccione / (Australia) Lleyton Hewitt
4. (United Kingdom) Josh Goodall / (United Kingdom) James Ward
5. (United Kingdom) Jonathan Marray / (Denmark) Frederik Nielsen

=== Women's doubles ===
1. (United Kingdom) Naomi Broady / (United Kingdom) Johanna Konta
2. (United Kingdom) Tara Moore / (United Kingdom) Melanie South
3. (United Kingdom) Laura Robson / (United Kingdom) Heather Watson

=== Mixed doubles ===
1. (United Kingdom) Ross Hutchins / (United Kingdom) Heather Watson
2. (United Kingdom) Dominic Inglot / (United Kingdom) Laura Robson
3. (United Kingdom) Jonathan Marray / (United Kingdom) Anne Keothavong
4. (United Kingdom) Ken Skupski / (United Kingdom) Melanie South

== Qualifiers entries ==
Below are the lists of the qualifiers entering in the main draws.

=== Men's singles ===
'Men's singles qualifiers

1. (Estonia) Jürgen Zopp
2. (Spain) Adrián Menéndez Maceiras
3. (France) Guillaume Rufin
4. (United States) Michael Russell
5. (United States) Jesse Levine
6. (France) Florent Serra
7. (United States) Ryan Sweeting
8. (Germany) Dustin Brown
9. (Italy) Simone Bolelli
10. (Chinese Taipei) Jimmy Wang
11. (United States) Brian Baker
12. (France) Kenny de Schepper
13. (Belgium) Ruben Bemelmans
14. (Spain) Íñigo Cervantes
15. (Poland) Jerzy Janowicz
16. (Russia) Andrey Kuznetsov

Lucky losers

1. (United States) Wayne Odesnik

=== Women's singles ===
Women's singles qualifiers

1. (Hungary) Melinda Czink
2. (Germany) Annika Beck
3. (Italy) Maria Elena Camerin
4. (France) Kristina Mladenovic
5. (Poland) Sandra Zaniewska
6. (Serbia) Vesna Dolonc
7. (Slovakia) Jana Čepelová
8. (Czech Republic) Kristýna Plíšková
9. (Czech Republic) Karolína Plíšková
10. (Italy) Camila Giorgi
11. (United States) CoCo Vandeweghe
12. (Croatia) Mirjana Lučić

Lucky losers

1. (Japan) Misaki Doi

=== Men's doubles ===
Men's doubles qualifiers

1. (Germany) Andre Begemann / (Slovakia) Igor Zelenay
2. (Germany) Matthias Bachinger / (Germany) Tobias Kamke
3. (United States) Bobby Reynolds / (South Africa) Izak van der Merwe
4. (United Kingdom) Lewis Burton / (United Kingdom) George Morgan

Lucky losers

1. (Thailand) Sanchai Ratiwatana / (Thailand) Sonchat Ratiwatana
2. (Australia) Colin Ebelthite / (Australia) John Peers

=== Women's doubles ===
Women's doubles qualifiers

1. (Croatia) Darija Jurak / (Hungary) Katalin Marosi
2. (Croatia) Mirjana Lučić / (Russia) Valeria Savinykh
3. (United States) Lindsay Lee-Waters / (United States) Megan Moulton-Levy
4. (Serbia) Vesna Dolonc / (Ukraine) Olga Savchuk

== Protected ranking ==
The following players were accepted directly into the main draw using a protected ranking:

Men's singles

- (Germany) Benjamin Becker
- (France) Paul-Henri Mathieu

== Withdrawals ==
The following players were accepted directly into the main tournament, but withdrew with injuries or personal reasons.

Men's singles

- (Uruguay) Pablo Cuevas → replaced by (Canada) Vasek Pospisil
- (India) Somdev Devvarman → replaced by (Slovakia) Karol Beck
- (France) Gaël Monfils → replaced by (United States) Wayne Odesnik
- (Sweden) Robin Söderling → replaced by (Slovenia) Blaž Kavčič

Women's singles

- (Romania) Alexandra Dulgheru → replaced by (Russia) Nina Bratchikova
- (Estonia) Kaia Kanepi → replaced by (United Kingdom) Heather Watson
- (Netherlands) Michaëlla Krajicek → replaced by (Japan) Misaki Doi
- (Germany) Andrea Petkovic → replaced by (Serbia) Bojana Jovanovski
- (Hungary) Ágnes Szávay → replaced by (Ukraine) Lesia Tsurenko

Preceded by 2012 French Open	Grand Slam tournaments	Succeeded by 2012 US Open
