= 2013 VTR Open – Doubles =

Doubles
- 2013 VTR Open

Final
- Champions: (Italy) Paolo Lorenzi (Italy) Potito Starace
- Runners-up: (Argentina) Juan Mónaco (Spain) Rafael Nadal
- Score: 6–2, 6–4

Events
| Singles | Doubles |
- VTR Open

Frederico Gil and Daniel Gimeno-Traver were the defending champions, but Gil decided not to participate.
Gimeno-Traver played alongside Albert Ramos, but lost in the first round to Carlos Berlocq and Leonardo Mayer.
Paolo Lorenzi and Potito Starace won the title, defeating Juan Mónaco and Rafael Nadal 6–2, 6–4 in the final.

== Seeds ==
1. (Italy) Daniele Bracciali / (Brazil) Marcelo Melo (first round)
2. (Czech Republic) František Čermák / (Czech Republic) Lukáš Dlouhý (first round)
3. (Germany) Dustin Brown / (Germany) Christopher Kas (first round)
4. (Austria) Oliver Marach / (Argentina) Horacio Zeballos (quarterfinals)

== Draw ==
Key

- Q = Qualifier
- WC = Wild card
- LL = Lucky loser
- Alt = Alternate
- ITF = ITF entry
- PR = Protected ranking
- SR = Special ranking
- SE = Special exempt
- JE = Junior exempt
- JR = Junior Accelerator Programme entrant
- CO = College Accelerator Programme entrant
- NG = Next Gen Accelerator Program entrant
- w/o = Walkover
- r = Retired
- d = Defaulted

=== Draw ===
First round
1 | (Italy) D Bracciali (Brazil) M Melo | 6 | 2 | [4]
(Russia) A Kuznetsov (Brazil) A Sá | 2 | 6 | [10]
WC | (Chile) C Garín (Chile) Nicolás Jarry | 4 | 5
(Spain) R Ramírez Hidalgo (Spain) T Robredo | 6 | 7
3 | (Germany) D Brown (Germany) C Kas | 4 | 4
(Spain) P Andújar (Spain) P Riba | 6 | 6
(Italy) P Lorenzi (Italy) P Starace | 6 | 7
WC | (Chile) G Lama (Chile) N Massú | 3 | 5
(Spain) D Gimeno-Traver (Spain) A Ramos | 2 | 3
(Argentina) C Berlocq (Argentina) L Mayer | 6 | 6
(United States) N Monroe (Germany) S Stadler | 6^{5} | 4
4 | (Austria) O Marach (Argentina) H Zeballos | 7^{7} | 6
(Colombia) JS Cabal (Colombia) S Giraldo | 4 | 6 | [7]
(France) G Rufin (Italy) F Volandri | 6 | 1 | [10]
(Argentina) J Mónaco (Spain) R Nadal | 6 | 6
2 | (Czech Republic) F Čermák (Czech Republic) L Dlouhý | 3 | 2

Quarterfinals
(Russia) A Kuznetsov (Brazil) A Sá | 6 | 6
(Spain) R Ramírez Hidalgo (Spain) T Robredo | 3 | 2
(Spain) P Andújar (Spain) P Riba | 4 | 3
(Italy) P Lorenzi (Italy) P Starace | 6 | 6
(Argentina) C Berlocq (Argentina) L Mayer | 6 | 6
4 | (Austria) O Marach (Argentina) H Zeballos | 2 | 4
(France) G Rufin (Italy) F Volandri | 2 | 6^{4}
(Argentina) J Mónaco (Spain) R Nadal | 6 | 7^{7}

Semifinals
(Russia) A Kuznetsov (Brazil) A Sá | 7 | 3 | [9]
(Italy) P Lorenzi (Italy) P Starace | 5 | 6 | [11]
(Argentina) C Berlocq (Argentina) L Mayer | 3 | 4
(Argentina) J Mónaco (Spain) R Nadal | 6 | 6

Final
(Italy) P Lorenzi (Italy) P Starace | 6 | 6
(Argentina) J Mónaco (Spain) R Nadal | 2 | 4
