= 2013 VTR Open – Singles =

Singles
- 2013 VTR Open

Final
- Champion: (Argentina) Horacio Zeballos
- Runner-up: (Spain) Rafael Nadal
- Score: 6–7^{(2–7)}, 7–6^{(8–6)}, 6–4

Details
- Draw: 28
- Seeds: 8

Events
| Singles | Doubles |
- VTR Open

Horacio Zeballos defeated Rafael Nadal in the final, 6–7^{(2–7)}, 7–6^{(8–6)}, 6–4 to win the singles tennis title at the 2013 Chile Open. It was Zeballos's first ATP Tour singles title, becoming the only man outside of the Big Four (Roger Federer, Novak Djokovic, and Andy Murray) to beat Nadal in a clay court final between 2004 and 2023. It was Nadal's first tournament in eight months.

Juan Mónaco was the defending champion, but lost to Guillaume Rufin in the second round.

== Seeds ==
The top four seeds receive a bye into the second round.

1. (Spain) Rafael Nadal (final)
2. (Argentina) Juan Mónaco (second round)
3. (France) Jérémy Chardy (semifinals)
4. (Spain) Pablo Andújar (second round)
5. (Spain) Albert Ramos (quarterfinals)
6. (Italy) Paolo Lorenzi (quarterfinals)
7. (Spain) Daniel Gimeno Traver (quarterfinals)
8. (Argentina) Carlos Berlocq (semifinals)

== Draw ==
Key

- Q = Qualifier
- WC = Wild card
- LL = Lucky loser
- Alt = Alternate
- ITF = ITF entry
- PR = Protected ranking
- SR = Special ranking
- SE = Special exempt
- JE = Junior exempt
- JR = Junior Accelerator Programme entrant
- CO = College Accelerator Programme entrant
- NG = Next Gen Accelerator Program entrant
- w/o = Walkover
- r = Retired
- d = Defaulted

=== Finals ===
Semifinals
1/WC | (Spain) Rafael Nadal | 6 | 6
3 | (France) Jérémy Chardy | 2 | 2
(Argentina) Horacio Zeballos | 6 | 7^{7}
8 | (Argentina) Carlos Berlocq | 3 | 6^{4}

Final
1/WC | (Spain) Rafael Nadal | 7^{7} | 6^{6} | 4
(Argentina) Horacio Zeballos | 6^{2} | 7^{8} | 6

=== Top half ===
First round
Q | (Argentina) F Delbonis | 2 | 7^{7} | 7^{7}
(Argentina) G Pella | 6 | 6^{4} | 6^{1}
WC | (Chile) N Massú | 7^{8} | 3 | 4
(Spain) A Montañés | 6^{6} | 6 | 6
(Portugal) J Sousa | 4 | 6 | 1
7 | (Spain) D Gimeno Traver | 6 | 4 | 6
Q | (Serbia) D Lajović | 3 | 4
WC | (Chile) C Garín | 6 | 6
(Spain) P Riba | 2 | 2
(Spain) T Robredo | 6 | 6
Q | (Italy) G Naso | 1 | 4
6 | (Italy) P Lorenzi | 6 | 6

Second round
1/WC | (Spain) R Nadal | 6 | 6
Q | (Argentina) F Delbonis | 3 | 2
(Spain) A Montañés | 4 | 4
7 | (Spain) D Gimeno Traver | 6 | 6
3 | (France) J Chardy | 4 | 6 | 6
WC | (Chile) C Garín | 6 | 3 | 2
(Spain) T Robredo | 4 | 4
6 | (Italy) P Lorenzi | 6 | 6

Quarterfinals
1/WC | (Spain) R Nadal | 6 | 6
7 | (Spain) D Gimeno Traver | 1 | 4
3 | (France) J Chardy | 6 | 6
6 | (Italy) P Lorenzi | 2 | 3

Semifinals
1/WC | (Spain) R Nadal | 6 | 6
3 | (France) J Chardy | 2 | 2

=== Bottom half ===
First round
5 | (Spain) A Ramos | 6 | 6
(Brazil) R Dutra da Silva | 4 | 1
(Argentina) L Mayer | 2 | 1
(Italy) F Volandri | 6 | 6
Q | (Argentina) D Schwartzman | 6 | 2 | 2
(Argentina) H Zeballos | 1 | 6 | 6
8 | (Argentina) C Berlocq | 6 | 6
(Russia) A Kuznetsov | 2 | 1
(Argentina) M Alund | 6 | 5 | 3
(Colombia) S Giraldo | 4 | 7 | 6
(France) G Rufin | 6 | 6
(Spain) R Ramírez Hidalgo | 3 | 4

Second round
5 | (Spain) A Ramos | 6^{5} | 6 | 7
(Italy) F Volandri | 7^{7} | 3 | 5
(Argentina) H Zeballos | 6 | 6
4 | (Spain) P Andújar | 3 | 3
8 | (Argentina) C Berlocq | 7 | 4 | 6
(Colombia) S Giraldo | 5 | 6 | 4
(France) G Rufin | 7^{7} | 6
2 | (Argentina) J Mónaco | 6^{3} | 4

Quarterfinals
5 | (Spain) A Ramos | 1 | 7 | 6^{6}
(Argentina) H Zeballos | 6 | 5 | 7^{8}
8 | (Argentina) C Berlocq | w/o
(France) G Rufin

Semifinals
(Argentina) H Zeballos | 6 | 7^{7}
8 | (Argentina) C Berlocq | 3 | 6^{4}

== Qualifying ==
=== Seeds ===
1. (Argentina) Federico Delbonis (qualified)
2. (Brazil) João Souza (first round)
3. (Portugal) Gastão Elias (qualifying competition)
4. (Chile) Paul Capdeville (first round)
5. (Germany) Dustin Brown (first round)
6. (Serbia) Dušan Lajović (qualified)
7. (Argentina) Diego Schwartzman (qualified)
8. (Argentina) Guido Andreozzi (qualifying competition)

=== Qualifiers ===
1. (Argentina) Federico Delbonis
2. (Argentina) Diego Schwartzman
3. (Serbia) Dušan Lajović
4. (Italy) Gianluca Naso

=== Draw ===
==== First qualifier ====
First round
1 | (Argentina) Federico Delbonis | 6 | 5 | 7
(Argentina) Facundo Bagnis | 4 | 7 | 6^{4}
(Colombia) Alejandro González | 2 | 4
(Spain) Sergio Gutiérrez Ferrol | 6 | 6
(Chile) Jorge Aguilar | 5 | 6 | 1
(Canada) Steven Diez | 7 | 2 | 6
WC | (Chile) Nicolás Jarry | 3 | 1
8 | (Argentina) Guido Andreozzi | 6 | 6

Second round
1 | (Argentina) Federico Delbonis | 7 | 6
(Spain) Sergio Gutiérrez Ferrol | 5 | 1
(Canada) Steven Diez | 6 | 2 | 4
8 | (Argentina) Guido Andreozzi | 3 | 6 | 6

Qualifying competition
1 | (Argentina) Federico Delbonis | 6 | 6
8 | (Argentina) Guido Andreozzi | 3 | 2

==== Second qualifier ====
First round
2 | (Brazil) João Souza | 4 | 2
(Russia) Teymuraz Gabashvili | 6 | 6
(Ecuador) Julio César Campozano | 7^{7} | 6
(Brazil) Ricardo Hocevar | 6^{4} | 0
WC | (Chile) Gonzalo Lama | 7^{7} | 7
(Argentina) Marco Trungelliti | 6^{3} | 5
(Germany) Julian Reister | 4 | 4
7 | (Argentina) Diego Schwartzman | 6 | 6

Second round
(Russia) Teymuraz Gabashvili | 6 | 6
(Ecuador) Julio César Campozano | 3 | 1
WC | (Chile) Gonzalo Lama | 7^{7} | 6^{1} | 1
7 | (Argentina) Diego Schwartzman | 6^{4} | 7^{7} | 6

Qualifying competition
(Russia) Teymuraz Gabashvili | 6^{2} | 1
7 | (Argentina) Diego Schwartzman | 7^{7} | 6

==== Third qualifier ====
First round
3 | (Portugal) Gastão Elias | 6 | 6
(Brazil) Fabiano de Paula | 3 | 3
(Argentina) Agustín Velotti | 6^{8} | 6 | 6
(Argentina) Diego Junqueira | 7^{10} | 3 | 4
(Spain) Javier Martí | 6^{4} | 7 | 6
(Italy) Potito Starace | 7^{7} | 5 | 2
WC | (Chile) Juan Carlos Sáez | 6 | 3 | 2
6 | (Serbia) Dušan Lajović | 1 | 6 | 6

Second round
3 | (Portugal) Gastão Elias | 6 | 6
(Argentina) Agustín Velotti | 4 | 2
(Spain) Javier Martí | 6^{3} | 7 | 5
6 | (Serbia) Dušan Lajović | 7^{7} | 5 | 7

Qualifying competition
3 | (Portugal) Gastão Elias | 3 | 6^{7}
6 | (Serbia) Dušan Lajović | 6 | 7^{9}

==== Fourth qualifier ====
First round
4 | (Chile) Paul Capdeville | 4 | 5
(Italy) Gianluca Naso | 6 | 7
(Brazil) Guilherme Clezar | 6^{3} | 6 | 5
(Chile) Hans Podlipnik Castillo | 7^{7} | 2 | 7
WC | (Chile) Bastian Malla | 1 | 1
(Argentina) Facundo Argüello | 6 | 6
(Portugal) Frederico Gil | 6 | 6
5 | (Germany) Dustin Brown | 2 | 4

Second round
(Italy) Gianluca Naso | 6 | 6
(Chile) Hans Podlipnik Castillo | 3 | 2
(Argentina) Facundo Argüello | 2 | 4
(Portugal) Frederico Gil | 6 | 6

Qualifying competition
(Italy) Gianluca Naso | 7 | 6
(Portugal) Frederico Gil | 5 | 3
