= 2011 Wimbledon Championships – Men's singles =

Men's singles
- 2011 Wimbledon Championships

Final
- Champion: (Serbia) Novak Djokovic
- Runner-up: (Spain) Rafael Nadal
- Score: 6–4, 6–1, 1–6, 6–3

Details
- Draw: 128 (16Q / 7WC)
- Seeds: 32

Events
| Singles | men | women | | boys | girls |
| Doubles | men | women | mixed | boys | girls |
| WC Singles | men | women | quad |
| WC Doubles | men | women | quad |
| Legends | men | women | seniors |
- Wimbledon Championships

Novak Djokovic defeated defending champion Rafael Nadal in the final, 6–4, 6–1, 1–6, 6–3 to win the gentlemen's singles tennis title at the 2011 Wimbledon Championships. It was his first Wimbledon title, third major title overall, and first career title on grass courts. Nadal's loss ended his 20-match Wimbledon winning streak dating back to 2008 (having missed the 2009 championships due to injury). It was Nadal's fifth non-consecutive and last Wimbledon final.

Both Nadal and Djokovic were in contention for the world No. 1 singles ranking. By winning his semifinal match against Jo-Wilfried Tsonga, Djokovic gained the world No. 1 ranking for the first time, and would eventually hold the position for a record total of 428 weeks. This marked the first time that neither Roger Federer nor Nadal was ranked No. 1 since 2 February 2004. This was also the first time since 2002 that neither Federer nor Nadal won the title.

This event marked the last major appearance of two-time French Open finalist Robin Söderling, as he would later be diagnosed with mononucleosis and eventually retire from tennis four years later.

== Seeds ==
1. (Spain) Rafael Nadal (final)
2. (Serbia) Novak Djokovic (champion)
3. (Switzerland) Roger Federer (quarterfinals)
4. (United Kingdom) Andy Murray (semifinals)
5. (Sweden) Robin Söderling (third round)
6. (Czech Republic) Tomáš Berdych (fourth round)
7. (Spain) David Ferrer (fourth round)
8. (United States) Andy Roddick (third round)
9. (France) Gaël Monfils (third round)
10. (United States) Mardy Fish (quarterfinals)
11. (Austria) Jürgen Melzer (third round)
12. (France) Jo-Wilfried Tsonga (semifinals)
13. (Serbia) Viktor Troicki (second round)
14. (Switzerland) Stanislas Wawrinka (second round)
15. (France) Gilles Simon (third round)
16. (Spain) Nicolás Almagro (third round)

17. (France) Richard Gasquet (fourth round)
18. (Russia) Mikhail Youzhny (fourth round)
19. (France) Michaël Llodra (fourth round)
20. (Germany) Florian Mayer (second round)
21. (Spain) Fernando Verdasco (second round)
22. (Ukraine) Alexandr Dolgopolov (first round)
23. (Serbia) Janko Tipsarević (first round, retired due to a groin injury)
24. (Argentina) Juan Martín del Potro (fourth round)
25. (Argentina) Juan Ignacio Chela (second round)
26. (Spain) Guillermo García-López (second round)
27. (Croatia) Marin Čilić (first round)
28. (Argentina) David Nalbandian (third round)
29. (Russia) Nikolay Davydenko (first round)
30. (Brazil) Thomaz Bellucci (first round)
31. (Canada) Milos Raonic (second round, retired due to a right leg injury)
32. (Cyprus) Marcos Baghdatis (third round)

Click on the seed number of a player to go to their draw section.

== Draw ==
Key

- Q = Qualifier
- WC = Wild card
- LL = Lucky loser
- Alt = Alternate
- ITF = ITF entry
- PR = Protected ranking
- SR = Special ranking
- SE = Special exempt
- JE = Junior exempt
- JR = Junior Accelerator Programme entrant
- CO = College Accelerator Programme entrant
- NG = Next Gen Accelerator Program entrant
- w/o = Walkover
- r = Retired
- d = Defaulted

=== Finals ===
Quarterfinals
1 | (Spain) Rafael Nadal | 6 | 6 | 5 | 6
10 | (United States) Mardy Fish | 3 | 3 | 7 | 4
4 | (United Kingdom) Andy Murray | 6 | 6 | 6
(Spain) Feliciano López | 3 | 4 | 4
12 | (France) Jo-Wilfried Tsonga | 3 | 6^{3} | 6 | 6 | 6
3 | (Switzerland) Roger Federer | 6 | 7^{7} | 4 | 4 | 4
Q | (Australia) Bernard Tomic | 2 | 6 | 3 | 5
2 | (Serbia) Novak Djokovic | 6 | 3 | 6 | 7

Semifinals
1 | (Spain) Rafael Nadal | 5 | 6 | 6 | 6
4 | (United Kingdom) Andy Murray | 7 | 2 | 2 | 4
12 | (France) Jo-Wilfried Tsonga | 6^{4} | 2 | 7^{11} | 3
2 | (Serbia) Novak Djokovic | 7^{7} | 6 | 6^{9} | 6

Final
1 | (Spain) Rafael Nadal | 4 | 1 | 6 | 3
2 | (Serbia) Novak Djokovic | 6 | 6 | 1 | 6

=== Top half ===
==== Section 1 ====
First round
1 | (Spain) R Nadal | 6 | 6 | 6
(United States) M Russell | 4 | 2 | 2
(Spain) P Andújar | 6 | 6 | 1 | 6^{1} | 1
(United States) R Sweeting | 3 | 4 | 6 | 7^{7} | 6
WC | (Luxembourg) G Müller | 7^{7} | 7^{7} | 3 | 6
PR | (Germany) T Haas | 6^{5} | 6^{3} | 6 | 3
LL | (France) M Gicquel | 3 | 6^{3} | 3
31 | (Canada) M Raonic | 6 | 7^{7} | 6
24 | (Argentina) JM del Potro | 6 | 6 | 6
Q | (Italy) F Cipolla | 1 | 4 | 3
(Belgium) O Rochus | 6^{6} | 3 | 6 | 6 | 6
Q | (France) K de Schepper | 7^{8} | 6 | 3 | 1 | 4
(Portugal) F Gil | 4 | 1 | 4
WC | (Israel) D Sela | 6 | 6 | 6
Q | (France) É Roger-Vasselin | 6 | 4 | 3 | 6^{3}
15 | (France) G Simon | 4 | 6 | 6 | 7^{7}

Second round
1 | (Spain) R Nadal | 6 | 6 | 6
(United States) R Sweeting | 3 | 2 | 4
WC | (Luxembourg) G Müller | 2
31 | (Canada) M Raonic | 3^{r}
24 | (Argentina) JM del Potro | 6^{7} | 6 | 6 | 6
(Belgium) O Rochus | 7^{9} | 1 | 0 | 4
WC | (Israel) D Sela | 6^{3} | 4 | 5
15 | (France) G Simon | 7^{7} | 6 | 7

Third round
1 | (Spain) R Nadal | 7^{8} | 7^{7} | 6
WC | (Luxembourg) G Müller | 6^{6} | 6^{5} | 0
24 | (Argentina) JM del Potro | 7^{10} | 7^{7} | 7
15 | (France) G Simon | 6^{8} | 6^{5} | 5

Fourth round
1 | (Spain) R Nadal | 7^{8} | 3 | 7^{7} | 6
24 | (Argentina) JM del Potro | 6^{6} | 6 | 6^{4} | 4

==== Section 2 ====
First round
10 | (United States) M Fish | 7^{7} | 7^{7} | 6
(Spain) M Granollers | 6^{3} | 6^{5} | 4
(Germany) P Kohlschreiber | 6 | 3 | 3 | 3
(Uzbekistan) D Istomin | 4 | 6 | 6 | 6
(Netherlands) R Haase | 6 | 6 | 6
(Spain) P Riba | 4 | 4 | 4
(Czech Republic) R Štěpánek | 6 | 6 | 3 | 6^{6} | 7
21 | (Spain) F Verdasco | 2 | 4 | 6 | 7^{8} | 9
25 | (Argentina) JI Chela | 6 | 6 | 6^{6} | 6
Q | (Australia) M Matosevic | 4 | 4 | 7^{8} | 2
(United States) D Young | 5 | 6 | 3 | 1
(United States) A Bogomolov Jr. | 7 | 4 | 6 | 6
Q | (Belgium) R Bemelmans | 4 | 2 | 6 | 6 | 1
(France) J Benneteau | 6 | 6 | 3 | 4 | 6
(Italy) F Volandri | 2 | 2 | 1
6 | (Czech Republic) T Berdych | 6 | 6 | 6

Second round
10 | (United States) M Fish | 7^{8} | 6 | 6
(Uzbekistan) D Istomin | 6^{6} | 4 | 4
(Netherlands) R Haase | 6 | 6 | 4 | 6
21 | (Spain) F Verdasco | 3 | 4 | 6 | 2
25 | (Argentina) JI Chela | 0 | 3 | 4
(United States) A Bogomolov Jr. | 6 | 6 | 6
(France) J Benneteau | 1 | 4 | 2
6 | (Czech Republic) T Berdych | 6 | 6 | 6

Third round
10 | (United States) M Fish | 6 | 6^{5} | 6 | 1
(Netherlands) R Haase | 3 | 7^{7} | 2 | 1^{r}
(United States) A Bogomolov Jr. | 2 | 4 | 3
6 | (Czech Republic) T Berdych | 6 | 6 | 6

Fourth round
10 | (United States) M Fish | 7^{7} | 6 | 6
6 | (Czech Republic) T Berdych | 6^{5} | 4 | 4

==== Section 3 ====
First round
4 | (United Kingdom) A Murray | 4 | 6 | 6 | 6
(Spain) D Gimeno Traver | 6 | 3 | 0 | 0
(Germany) T Kamke | 6 | 7^{7} | 5 | 6
(Slovenia) B Kavčič | 3 | 6^{4} | 7 | 1
(Ukraine) S Stakhovsky | 6 | 6 | 6
WC | (United Kingdom) D Cox | 2 | 4 | 4
(Croatia) I Ljubičić | 7^{7} | 3 | 6 | 6
27 | (Croatia) M Čilić | 6^{2} | 6 | 3 | 4
17 | (France) R Gasquet | 7 | 6 | 7^{7}
(Colombia) S Giraldo | 5 | 3 | 6^{3}
(Russia) I Kunitsyn | 6 | 6 | 6
Q | (Netherlands) I Sijsling | 3 | 4 | 2
Q | (Austria) M Fischer | 5 | 4 | 4
LL | (Italy) S Bolelli | 7 | 6 | 6
(Italy) P Starace | 3 | 4 | 4
14 | (Switzerland) S Wawrinka | 6 | 6 | 6

Second round
4 | (United Kingdom) A Murray | 6 | 6 | 7
(Germany) T Kamke | 3 | 3 | 5
(Ukraine) S Stakhovsky | 4 | 4 | 2
(Croatia) I Ljubičić | 6 | 6 | 6
17 | (France) R Gasquet | 6 | 6 | 6
(Russia) I Kunitsyn | 1 | 4 | 4
LL | (Italy) S Bolelli | 7^{7} | 6 | 7^{7}
14 | (Switzerland) S Wawrinka | 6^{5} | 3 | 6^{4}

Third round
4 | (United Kingdom) A Murray | 6 | 4 | 6 | 7^{7}
(Croatia) I Ljubičić | 4 | 6 | 1 | 6^{4}
17 | (France) R Gasquet | 6 | 6 | 6
LL | (Italy) S Bolelli | 3 | 2 | 4

Fourth round
4 | (United Kingdom) A Murray | 7^{7} | 6 | 6
17 | (France) R Gasquet | 6^{3} | 3 | 2

==== Section 4 ====
First round
9 | (France) G Monfils | 6 | 7^{7} | 6
(Germany) M Bachinger | 4 | 6^{3} | 3
LL | (Slovenia) G Žemlja | 6 | 3 | 7^{10} | 6
Q | (Slovakia) L Lacko | 4 | 6 | 6^{8} | 4
WC | (France) A Clément | 4 | 2 | 6 | 7 | 4
Q | (Poland) Ł Kubot | 6 | 6 | 3 | 5 | 6
PR | (Croatia) I Karlović | 7 | 3
23 | (Serbia) J Tipsarević | 5 | 1^{r}
30 | (Brazil) T Bellucci | 6^{3} | 4 | 2
(Germany) R Schüttler | 7^{7} | 6 | 6
(Spain) F López | 6 | 7 | 6
(Germany) M Berrer | 4 | 5 | 3
(Czech Republic) J Pospíšil | 4 | 3 | 2
(Romania) V Hănescu | 6 | 6 | 6
Q | (Germany) A Beck | 4 | 6^{6} | 3
8 | (United States) A Roddick | 6 | 7^{8} | 6

Second round
9 | (France) G Monfils | 4 | 6 | 6 | 7^{9}
LL | (Slovenia) G Žemlja | 6 | 3 | 3 | 6^{7}
Q | (Poland) Ł Kubot | 7^{7} | 6 | 6
PR | (Croatia) I Karlović | 6^{2} | 3 | 3
(Germany) R Schüttler | 6^{3} | 7^{7} | 2 | 2
(Spain) F López | 7^{7} | 6^{3} | 6 | 6
(Romania) V Hănescu | 4 | 3 | 4
8 | (United States) A Roddick | 6 | 6 | 6

Third round
9 | (France) G Monfils | 3 | 6 | 3 | 3
Q | (Poland) Ł Kubot | 6 | 3 | 6 | 6
(Spain) F López | 7^{7} | 7^{7} | 6
8 | (United States) A Roddick | 6^{2} | 6^{2} | 4

Fourth round
Q | (Poland) Ł Kubot | 6 | 7^{7} | 6^{7} | 5 | 5
(Spain) F López | 3 | 6^{5} | 7^{9} | 7 | 7

=== Bottom half ===
==== Section 5 ====
First round
7 | (Spain) D Ferrer | 6 | 6 | 6
(France) B Paire | 4 | 4 | 4
(Croatia) I Dodig | 6^{5} | 0 | 5
LL | (United States) R Harrison | 7^{7} | 6 | 7
(Argentina) C Berlocq | 6 | 6^{6} | 6 | 2 | 4
Q | (Slovakia) K Beck | 4 | 7^{8} | 4 | 6 | 6
(Kazakhstan) A Golubev | 3 | 3 | 0^{r}
26 | (Spain) G García López | 6 | 6 | 0
22 | (Ukraine) A Dolgopolov | 3 | 7^{8} | 6^{3} | 4
PR | (Chile) F González | 6 | 6^{6} | 7^{7} | 6
Q | (South Africa) R de Voest | 6 | 6 | 6
(Spain) R Ramírez Hidalgo | 2 | 3 | 2
(Bulgaria) G Dimitrov | 7 | 7 | 7^{7}
Q | (Germany) C-M Stebe | 5 | 5 | 6^{5}
LL | (Japan) G Soeda | 3 | 6^{4} | 2
12 | (France) J-W Tsonga | 6 | 7^{7} | 6

Second round
7 | (Spain) D Ferrer | 6^{6} | 6 | 4 | 6 | 6
LL | (United States) R Harrison | 7^{8} | 1 | 6 | 3 | 2
Q | (Slovakia) K Beck | 7^{7} | 6 | 3 | 6
26 | (Spain) G García López | 6^{5} | 4 | 6 | 4
PR | (Chile) F González | 6 | 6 | 6
Q | (South Africa) R de Voest | 4 | 4 | 4
(Bulgaria) G Dimitrov | 7^{7} | 4 | 4 | 6^{8}
12 | (France) J-W Tsonga | 6^{4} | 6 | 6 | 7^{10}

Third round
7 | (Spain) D Ferrer | 6 | 6 | 6
Q | (Slovakia) K Beck | 4 | 3 | 3
PR | (Chile) F González | 3 | 4 | 3
12 | (France) J-W Tsonga | 6 | 6 | 6

Fourth round
7 | (Spain) D Ferrer | 3 | 4 | 6^{1}
12 | (France) J-W Tsonga | 6 | 6 | 7^{7}

==== Section 6 ====
First round
16 | (Spain) N Almagro | 6^{5} | 6 | 6 | 6
(Finland) J Nieminen | 7^{7} | 3 | 4 | 4
(United States) J Isner | 7^{7} | 6 | 7^{8}
(France) N Mahut | 6^{4} | 2 | 6^{6}
(India) S Devvarman | 6 | 4
(Germany) D Gremelmayr | 4 | 2^{r}
(Argentina) J Mónaco | 6 | 2 | 2 | 6 | 4
18 | (Russia) M Youzhny | 4 | 6 | 6 | 4 | 6
28 | (Argentina) D Nalbandian | 7 | 6 | 6
(Germany) J Reister | 5 | 2 | 3
(France) F Serra | 6^{5} | 3 | 3
(Austria) A Haider-Maurer | 7^{7} | 6 | 6
(France) A Mannarino | 4 | 6 | 7^{9} | 4 | 6
Q | (Republic of Ireland) C Niland | 6 | 4 | 6^{7} | 6 | 4
(Kazakhstan) M Kukushkin | 6^{2} | 4 | 2
3 | (Switzerland) R Federer | 7^{7} | 6 | 6

Second round
16 | (Spain) N Almagro | 7^{7} | 7^{7} | 6^{5} | 6
(United States) J Isner | 6^{3} | 6^{5} | 7^{7} | 3
(India) S Devvarman | 2 | 4 | 4
18 | (Russia) M Youzhny | 6 | 6 | 6
28 | (Argentina) D Nalbandian | 6 | 3 | 6 | 6
(Austria) A Haider-Maurer | 3 | 6 | 4 | 4
(France) A Mannarino | 2 | 3 | 2
3 | (Switzerland) R Federer | 6 | 6 | 6

Third round
16 | (Spain) N Almagro | 6 | 3 | 6^{3} | 3
18 | (Russia) M Youzhny | 4 | 6 | 7^{7} | 6
28 | (Argentina) D Nalbandian | 4 | 2 | 4
3 | (Switzerland) R Federer | 6 | 6 | 6

Fourth round
18 | (Russia) M Youzhny | 7^{7} | 3 | 3 | 3
3 | (Switzerland) R Federer | 6^{5} | 6 | 6 | 6

==== Section 7 ====
First round
5 | (Sweden) R Söderling | 6 | 6 | 2 | 7^{7}
(Germany) P Petzschner | 4 | 4 | 6 | 6^{5}
(Japan) K Nishikori | 1 | 6^{4} | 7^{9} | 3
(Australia) L Hewitt | 6 | 7^{7} | 6^{7} | 6
(Russia) I Andreev | 6 | 7^{7} | 6^{4} | 4 | 6
(Russia) T Gabashvili | 4 | 6^{5} | 7^{7} | 6 | 3
Q | (Australia) B Tomic | 7 | 6 | 7
29 | (Russia) N Davydenko | 5 | 3 | 5
20 | (Germany) F Mayer | 7^{7} | 7^{7} | 3 | 6
WC | (United Kingdom) D Evans | 6^{5} | 6^{1} | 6 | 4
(Belgium) X Malisse | 6 | 6 | 6
(Germany) M Zverev | 2 | 3 | 2
(Latvia) E Gulbis | 3 | 6 | 6^{12} | 6^{1}
(Russia) D Tursunov | 6 | 3 | 7^{14} | 7^{7}
WC | (Colombia) A Falla | 6 | 6^{5} | 2 | 2
11 | (Austria) J Melzer | 3 | 7^{7} | 6 | 6

Second round
5 | (Sweden) R Söderling | 6^{5} | 3 | 7 | 6 | 6
(Australia) L Hewitt | 7^{7} | 6 | 5 | 4 | 4
(Russia) I Andreev | 6 | 7 | 3 | 4 | 1
Q | (Australia) B Tomic | 4 | 5 | 6 | 6 | 6
20 | (Germany) F Mayer | 6 | 3 | 2 | 2
(Belgium) X Malisse | 1 | 6 | 6 | 6
(Russia) D Tursunov | 3 | 6 | 6^{5} | 6^{1}
11 | (Austria) J Melzer | 6 | 2 | 7^{7} | 7^{7}

Third round
5 | (Sweden) R Söderling | 1 | 4 | 5
Q | (Australia) B Tomic | 6 | 6 | 7
(Belgium) X Malisse | 7^{7} | 6 | 6
11 | (Austria) J Melzer | 6^{5} | 3 | 0

Fourth round
Q | (Australia) B Tomic | 6 | 7 | 6
(Belgium) X Malisse | 1 | 5 | 4

==== Section 8 ====
First round
13 | (Serbia) V Troicki | 3 | 6 | 7^{7} | 6
(Argentina) M González | 6 | 0 | 6^{3} | 3
(Chinese Taipei) Y-h Lu | 6 | 6 | 6
(Spain) T Robredo | 4 | 4 | 1
(Brazil) R Mello | 3 | 3 | 6 | 7^{8} | 6
Q | (Canada) F Dancevic | 6 | 6 | 4 | 6^{6} | 2
WC | (United Kingdom) J Ward | 3 | 6^{4} | 3
19 | (France) M Llodra | 6 | 7^{7} | 6
32 | (Cyprus) M Baghdatis | 6 | 6 | 6^{5} | 4 | 6
(United States) J Blake | 4 | 2 | 7^{7} | 6 | 4
(Italy) A Seppi | 6 | 6 | 7
(Spain) A Montañés | 4 | 4 | 5
(South Africa) K Anderson | 6^{5} | 7^{9} | 6 | 4 | 6
(Ukraine) I Marchenko | 7^{7} | 6^{7} | 4 | 6 | 1
(France) J Chardy | 4 | 1 | 1
2 | (Serbia) N Djokovic | 6 | 6 | 6

Second round
13 | (Serbia) V Troicki | 6^{5} | 4 | 4
(Chinese Taipei) Y-h Lu | 7^{7} | 6 | 6
(Brazil) R Mello | 2 | 6 | 2 | 3
19 | (France) M Llodra | 6 | 4 | 6 | 6
32 | (Cyprus) M Baghdatis | 6 | 7^{7} | 7
(Italy) A Seppi | 4 | 6^{4} | 5
(South Africa) K Anderson | 3 | 4 | 2
2 | (Serbia) N Djokovic | 6 | 6 | 6

Third round
(Chinese Taipei) Y-h Lu | 3 | 3 | 1
19 | (France) M Llodra | 6 | 6 | 6
32 | (Cyprus) M Baghdatis | 4 | 6 | 3 | 4
2 | (Serbia) N Djokovic | 6 | 4 | 6 | 6

Fourth round
19 | (France) M Llodra | 3 | 3 | 3
2 | (Serbia) N Djokovic | 6 | 6 | 6

| Preceded by 2011 French Open – Men's singles | Grand Slam men's singles | Succeeded by 2011 US Open – Men's singles |
