= 2013 Wimbledon Championships – Men's singles qualifying =

Men's singles qualifying
- 2013 Wimbledon Championships

Events
Singles	men	women		boys	girls
Doubles	men	women	mixed	boys	girls
WC Singles	men	women	quad
WC Doubles	men	women	quad
Legends	men	women	seniors

Qualification
Singles	men	women
Doubles	men	women
- Wimbledon Championships

Players and pairs who neither have high enough rankings nor receive wild cards may participate in a qualifying tournament held one week before the annual Wimbledon Tennis Championships.

== Seeds ==
1. (Israel) Dudi Sela (first round)
2. (United States) Jack Sock (first round)
3. (Portugal) João Sousa (qualifying competition)
4. (United States) Wayne Odesnik (qualified)
5. (Czech Republic) Jiří Veselý (second round)
6. (United States) Denis Kudla (qualified)
7. (Germany) Jan-Lennard Struff (qualified)
8. (United States) Tim Smyczek (qualifying competition)
9. (Ukraine) Illya Marchenko (second round)
10. (Serbia) Dušan Lajović (first round)
11. (Poland) Michał Przysiężny (qualified)
12. (United States) Rhyne Williams (qualifying competition)
13. (Japan) Go Soeda (qualified)
14. (Germany) Matthias Bachinger (first round)
15. (France) Marc Gicquel (qualified)
16. (Russia) Teymuraz Gabashvili (qualified)
17. (Italy) Matteo Viola (first round)
18. (Japan) Yūichi Sugita (first round)
19. (Germany) Simon Greul (first round)
20. (Belgium) Olivier Rochus (qualifying competition, retired, lucky loser)
21. (Germany) Julian Reister (qualified)
22. (India) Somdev Devvarman (first round)
23. (Belgium) Ruben Bemelmans (qualifying competition)
24. (Italy) Flavio Cipolla (qualifying competition)
25. (Spain) Daniel Muñoz de la Nava (qualifying competition)
26. (Argentina) Guido Andreozzi (second round)
27. (United States) Bobby Reynolds (qualified)
28. (France) Florent Serra (second round)
29. (Chinese Taipei) Jimmy Wang (qualified)
30. (Switzerland) Marco Chiudinelli (first round)
31. (Germany) Michael Berrer (qualifying competition)
32. (Chile) Paul Capdeville (second round)

== Qualifiers ==
1. (France) Stéphane Robert
2. (Germany) Bastian Knittel
3. (Germany) Julian Reister
4. (United States) Wayne Odesnik
5. (Germany) Dustin Brown
6. (United States) Denis Kudla
7. (Germany) Jan-Lennard Struff
8. (Australia) Matt Reid
9. (Chinese Taipei) Jimmy Wang
10. (Australia) James Duckworth
11. (Poland) Michał Przysiężny
12. (United States) Bobby Reynolds
13. (Japan) Go Soeda
14. (United States) Alex Kuznetsov
15. (France) Marc Gicquel
16. (Russia) Teymuraz Gabashvili

== Lucky loser ==
1. (Belgium) Olivier Rochus

== Qualifying draw ==
=== First qualifier ===
First round
1	(Israel) Dudi Sela	4	7^{7}	2
(France) Stéphane Robert	6	6^{5}	6
(Ukraine) Oleksandr Nedovyesov	6	6^{5}	6
(Brazil) Leonardo Kirche	4	7^{7}	1
(Moldova) Radu Albot	4	6^{5}
(Belarus) Dzmitry Zhyrmont	6	7^{7}
(Republic of Ireland) James McGee	3	4
32	(Chile) Paul Capdeville	6	6

Second round
(France) Stéphane Robert	6	6
(Ukraine) Oleksandr Nedovyesov	1	3
(Belarus) Dzmitry Zhyrmont	6	7^{7}
32	(Chile) Paul Capdeville	3	6^{3}

Qualifying competition
(France) Stéphane Robert	6	1	3	6	6
(Belarus) Dzmitry Zhyrmont	4	6	6	4	4

=== Second qualifier ===
First round
2	(United States) Jack Sock	2	2
(Germany) Mischa Zverev	6	6
(Slovakia) Pavol Červenák	4	5
(Germany) Bastian Knittel	6	7
PR	(Germany) Sebastian Rieschick	3	2
WC	(United Kingdom) David Rice	6	6
(Spain) Jordi Samper-Montaña	3	1
24	(Italy) Flavio Cipolla	6	6

Second round
(Germany) Mischa Zverev	7^{7}	3	3
(Germany) Bastian Knittel	6^{2}	6	6
WC	(United Kingdom) David Rice	3	4
24	(Italy) Flavio Cipolla	6	6

Qualifying competition
(Germany) Bastian Knittel	6	7	3	2	6
24	(Italy) Flavio Cipolla	2	5	6	6	3

=== Third qualifier ===
First round
3	(Portugal) João Sousa	6	6
(France) Nicolas Renavand	4	3
(Colombia) Alejandro González	6^{5}	0
(Germany) Cedrik-Marcel Stebe	7^{7}	6
(Spain) Sergio Gutiérrez Ferrol	1	6^{2}
(Slovakia) Karol Beck	6	7^{7}
(Spain) Arnau Brugués Davi	4	6^{10}
21	(Germany) Julian Reister	6	7^{12}

Second round
3	(Portugal) João Sousa	7^{8}	6
(Germany) Cedrik-Marcel Stebe	6^{6}	3
(Slovakia) Karol Beck	6^{5}	6^{3}
21	(Germany) Julian Reister	7^{7}	7^{7}

Qualifying competition
3	(Portugal) João Sousa	3	3	3
21	(Germany) Julian Reister	6	6	6

=== Fourth qualifier ===
First round
4	(United States) Wayne Odesnik	6	6
(Brazil) Thiago Alves	1	4
(Belgium) Arthur De Greef	6	7^{7}
(Colombia) Carlos Salamanca	4	6^{4}
(France) Josselin Ouanna	7^{7}	6
PR	(Dominican Republic) Víctor Estrella Burgos	6^{5}	2
(Argentina) Renzo Olivo	3	4
20	(Belgium) Olivier Rochus	6	6

Second round
4	(United States) Wayne Odesnik	6	6
(Belgium) Arthur De Greef	1	4
(France) Josselin Ouanna	3	4
20	(Belgium) Olivier Rochus	6	6

Qualifying competition
4	(United States) Wayne Odesnik	2	2	6	3
20	(Belgium) Olivier Rochus	6	6	4	0^{r}

=== Fifth qualifier ===
First round
5	(Czech Republic) Jiří Veselý	7^{7}	6
(Australia) John-Patrick Smith	6^{3}	3
(Germany) Dustin Brown	6	6
WC	(United Kingdom) Lewis Burton	4	3
(Slovakia) Marek Semjan	6^{5}	3
WC	(United Kingdom) Alex Bogdanovic	7^{7}	6
(Kazakhstan) Evgeny Korolev	6	7
18	(Japan) Yūichi Sugita	3	5

Second round
5	(Czech Republic) Jiří Veselý	4	6^{4}
(Germany) Dustin Brown	6	7^{7}
WC	(United Kingdom) Alex Bogdanovic	5	6	3
(Kazakhstan) Evgeny Korolev	7	2	6

Qualifying competition
(Germany) Dustin Brown	7^{7}	6	6
(Kazakhstan) Evgeny Korolev	6^{5}	3	2

=== Sixth qualifier ===
First round
6	(United States) Denis Kudla	6	6
(France) Pierre-Hugues Herbert	3	4
WC	(Canada) Filip Peliwo	6	1	9
(United States) Bradley Klahn	2	6	7
(Switzerland) Henri Laaksonen	6	6
(France) David Guez	3	3
(France) Jonathan Dasnières de Veigy	3	4
23	(Belgium) Ruben Bemelmans	6	6

Second round
6	(United States) Denis Kudla	6	5	6
WC	(Canada) Filip Peliwo	1	7	1
(Switzerland) Henri Laaksonen	4	3
23	(Belgium) Ruben Bemelmans	6	6

Qualifying competition
6	(United States) Denis Kudla	6	6	6
23	(Belgium) Ruben Bemelmans	4	4	3

=== Seventh qualifier ===
First round
7	(Germany) Jan-Lennard Struff	6	6
(Belarus) Uladzimir Ignatik	3	3
PR	(France) Laurent Rochette	6	4	4
(Japan) Hiroki Moriya	3	6	6
(Belgium) Niels Desein	6	1	5
(Russia) Igor Kunitsyn	2	6	7
WC	(United Kingdom) Jamie Baker	4	6	6
17	(Italy) Matteo Viola	6	3	4

Second round
7	(Germany) Jan-Lennard Struff	6	3	8
(Japan) Hiroki Moriya	3	6	6
(Russia) Igor Kunitsyn	6^{5}	6	6
WC	(United Kingdom) Jamie Baker	7^{7}	3	4

Qualifying competition
7	(Germany) Jan-Lennard Struff	6	6	6
(Russia) Igor Kunitsyn	3	4	2

=== Eighth qualifier ===
First round
8	(United States) Tim Smyczek	6	6
(Spain) Adrián Menéndez Maceiras	2	4
(Bosnia and Herzegovina) Mirza Bašić	6^{4}	3
(Chinese Taipei) Yang Tsung-hua	7^{7}	3^{r}
(Canada) Peter Polansky	2	3
(Israel) Amir Weintraub	6	6
(Australia) Matt Reid	7^{7}	4	18
22	(India) Somdev Devvarman	6^{4}	6	16

Second round
8	(United States) Tim Smyczek	6	7
(Bosnia and Herzegovina) Mirza Bašić	3	5
(Israel) Amir Weintraub	6^{5}	3
(Australia) Matt Reid	7^{7}	6

Qualifying competition
8	(United States) Tim Smyczek	6	5	6^{5}	5
(Australia) Matt Reid	3	7	7^{7}	7

=== Ninth qualifier ===
First round
9	(Ukraine) Illya Marchenko	6	5	7
WC	(United Kingdom) Edward Corrie	4	7	5
(Tunisia) Malek Jaziri	6	5	6
(Czech Republic) Jan Mertl	3	7	4
(Canada) Frank Dancevic	7^{7}	6
PR	(France) Albano Olivetti	6^{1}	2
(Netherlands) Boy Westerhof	1	4
29	(Chinese Taipei) Jimmy Wang	6	6

Second round
9	(Ukraine) Illya Marchenko	7^{7}	5	4
(Tunisia) Malek Jaziri	6^{4}	7	6
(Canada) Frank Dancevic	2	2
29	(Chinese Taipei) Jimmy Wang	6	6

Qualifying competition
(Tunisia) Malek Jaziri	5	5	2
29	(Chinese Taipei) Jimmy Wang	7	7	6

=== Tenth qualifier ===
First round
10	(Serbia) Dušan Lajović	3	1
(Australia) James Duckworth	6	6
(United States) Donald Young	4	3
(Argentina) Agustín Velotti	6	6
(Netherlands) Matwé Middelkoop	3	7^{7}	6
(Italy) Alessio di Mauro	6	6^{2}	1
(Brazil) André Ghem	3	5
31	(Germany) Michael Berrer	6	7

Second round
(Australia) James Duckworth	6	6
(Argentina) Agustín Velotti	2	3
(Netherlands) Matwé Middelkoop	2	1
31	(Germany) Michael Berrer	6	6

Qualifying competition
(Australia) James Duckworth	7^{7}	6	7^{7}
31	(Germany) Michael Berrer	6^{4}	4	6^{5}

=== Eleventh qualifier ===
First round
11	(Poland) Michał Przysiężny	2	6	6
(Czech Republic) Dušan Lojda	6	3	2
WC	(United Kingdom) Josh Goodall	4	6^{6}
(Australia) Sam Groth	6	7^{8}
(Germany) Peter Gojowczyk	6	6
(Croatia) Antonio Veić	1	1
WC	(United Kingdom) Dan Evans	1	6	2
25	(Spain) Daniel Muñoz de la Nava	6	3	6

Second round
11	(Poland) Michał Przysiężny	7^{7}	7^{10}
(Australia) Sam Groth	6^{3}	6^{8}
(Germany) Peter Gojowczyk	2	1
25	(Spain) Daniel Muñoz de la Nava	6	6

Qualifying competition
11	(Poland) Michał Przysiężny	7^{7}	6	6
25	(Spain) Daniel Muñoz de la Nava	6^{3}	4	4

=== Twelfth qualifier ===
First round
12	(United States) Rhyne Williams	6	6
(Romania) Victor Crivoi	2	4
(Brazil) Fabiano de Paula	6^{6}	5
(Canada) Steven Diez	7^{8}	7
(Bosnia and Herzegovina) Aldin Šetkić	4	6	3
(Brazil) Marcelo Demoliner	6	3	6
(Chile) Jorge Aguilar	4	2
27	(United States) Bobby Reynolds	6	6

Second round
12	(United States) Rhyne Williams	7^{8}	6
(Canada) Steven Diez	6^{6}	4
(Brazil) Marcelo Demoliner	6^{3}	6^{7}
27	(United States) Bobby Reynolds	7^{7}	7^{9}

Qualifying competition
12	(United States) Rhyne Williams	6	3	6^{4}	2
27	(United States) Bobby Reynolds	4	6	7^{7}	6

=== Thirteenth qualifier ===
First round
13	(Japan) Go Soeda	6	6
(Croatia) Nikola Mektić	2	0
(Hungary) Márton Fucsovics	1	7	10
(Thailand) Danai Udomchoke	6	5	12
(South Africa) Rik de Voest	6^{5}	6	4
(Serbia) Boris Pašanski	7^{7}	3	6
(Italy) Gianluca Naso	1	6	6
30	(Switzerland) Marco Chiudinelli	6	1	4

Second round
13	(Japan) Go Soeda	6	6
(Thailand) Danai Udomchoke	3	2
(Serbia) Boris Pašanski	6	7
(Italy) Gianluca Naso	3	5

Qualifying competition
13	(Japan) Go Soeda	6	6	6
(Serbia) Boris Pašanski	2	2	4

=== Fourteenth qualifier ===
First round
14	(Germany) Matthias Bachinger	7^{7}	3	2
(Japan) Tatsuma Ito	6^{5}	6	6
(Spain) Íñigo Cervantes	2	4
(Belgium) Maxime Authom	6	6
(United States) Alex Kuznetsov	6	6
WC	(United Kingdom) Joshua Ward-Hibbert	4	4
(Argentina) Marco Trungelliti	5	0
26	(Argentina) Guido Andreozzi	7	6

Second round
(Japan) Tatsuma Ito	3	2
(Belgium) Maxime Authom	6	6
(United States) Alex Kuznetsov	6	6^{4}	6
26	(Argentina) Guido Andreozzi	0	7^{7}	2

Qualifying competition
(Belgium) Maxime Authom	3	7	6	5	5
(United States) Alex Kuznetsov	6	5	3	7	7

=== Fifteenth qualifier ===
First round
15	(France) Marc Gicquel	6	6
(Chinese Taipei) Chen Ti	2	2
(Australia) Matthew Barton	6	2	4
(Uzbekistan) Farrukh Dustov	3	6	6
(Brazil) Guilherme Clezar	6	5	5
(Spain) Javier Martí	2	7	7
(France) Vincent Millot	1	6	3
28	(France) Florent Serra	6	3	6

Second round
15	(France) Marc Gicquel	6	3	9
(Uzbekistan) Farrukh Dustov	2	6	7
(Spain) Javier Martí	6	6
28	(France) Florent Serra	4	2

Qualifying competition
15	(France) Marc Gicquel	7^{7}	6	4	6
(Spain) Javier Martí	6^{4}	4	6	2

=== Sixteenth qualifier ===
First round
16	(Russia) Teymuraz Gabashvili	7	7^{7}
(France) Jonathan Eysseric	5	6^{3}
(Slovakia) Jozef Kovalík	1	2
(Germany) Dominik Meffert	6	6
(United States) Michael Yani	3	6^{5}
(Ukraine) Denys Molchanov	6	7^{7}
Alt	(Austria) Martin Fischer	4	6	0
19	(Germany) Simon Greul	6	4	0^{r}

Second round
16	(Russia) Teymuraz Gabashvili	7	6
(Germany) Dominik Meffert	5	4
(Ukraine) Denys Molchanov	0^{r}
Alt	(Austria) Martin Fischer	4

Qualifying competition
16	(Russia) Teymuraz Gabashvili	3	7	6	6
Alt	(Austria) Martin Fischer	6	5	4	3
