= 2013 Wimbledon Championships – Men's doubles qualifying =

Men's doubles qualifying
- 2013 Wimbledon Championships

Events
Singles	men	women		boys	girls
Doubles	men	women	mixed	boys	girls
WC Singles	men	women	quad
WC Doubles	men	women	quad
Legends	men	women	seniors

Qualification
Singles	men	women
Doubles	men	women
- Wimbledon Championships

Players and pairs who neither have high enough rankings nor receive wild cards may participate in a qualifying tournament held one week before the annual Wimbledon Tennis Championships.

== Seeds ==
1. (Germany) Dustin Brown / (Australia) Rameez Junaid (qualifying competition, Lucky losers)
2. (Australia) Sam Groth / (Australia) Chris Guccione (qualified)
3. (Germany) Dominik Meffert / (Austria) Philipp Oswald (qualified)
4. (India) Purav Raja / (India) Divij Sharan (qualified)
5. (Australia) Colin Ebelthite / (Canada) Adil Shamasdin (first round)
6. (United Kingdom) Brydan Klein / (Australia) Dane Propoggia (first round)
7. (United States) Steve Johnson / (Sweden) Andreas Siljeström (qualifying competition, Lucky losers)
8. (Canada) Jesse Levine / (Canada) Vasek Pospisil (qualified)

== Qualifiers ==
1. (Canada) Jesse Levine / (Canada) Vasek Pospisil
2. (Australia) Sam Groth / (Australia) Chris Guccione
3. (Germany) Dominik Meffert / (Austria) Philipp Oswald
4. (India) Purav Raja / (India) Divij Sharan

== Lucky losers ==
1. (Germany) Dustin Brown / (Australia) Rameez Junaid
2. (United States) Steve Johnson / (Sweden) Andreas Siljeström
3. (United States) Denis Kudla / (United States) Tim Smyczek

== Qualifying draw ==
=== First qualifier ===
First round
1	(Germany) Dustin Brown (Australia) Rameez Junaid	6^{2}	6	6
WC	(United Kingdom) Edward Corrie (United Kingdom) Neal Skupski	7^{7}	3	3
(Russia) Teymuraz Gabashvili (Portugal) João Sousa	0	6^{0}
8	(Canada) Jesse Levine (Canada) Vasek Pospisil	6	7^{7}

Qualifying competition
1	(Germany) Dustin Brown (Australia) Rameez Junaid	4	4
8	(Canada) Jesse Levine (Canada) Vasek Pospisil	6	6

=== Second qualifier ===
First round
2	(Australia) Sam Groth (Australia) Chris Guccione	7^{7}	6
Alt	(Germany) Matthias Bachinger (Germany) Michael Kohlmann	6^{4}	2
WC	(United Kingdom) Lewis Burton (United Kingdom) Dan Evans	6^{7}	6	9
7	(United States) Steve Johnson (Sweden) Andreas Siljeström	7^{9}	4	11

Qualifying competition
2	(Australia) Sam Groth (Australia) Chris Guccione	6	7^{7}
7	(United States) Steve Johnson (Sweden) Andreas Siljeström	3	6^{3}

=== Third qualifier ===
First round
3	(Germany) Dominik Meffert (Austria) Philipp Oswald	6	6
(Italy) Stefano Ianni (France) Adrian Mannarino	4	1
(United States) Denis Kudla (United States) Tim Smyczek	7^{7}	6
5	(Australia) Colin Ebelthite (Canada) Adil Shamasdin	6^{4}	3

Qualifying competition
3	(Germany) Dominik Meffert (Austria) Philipp Oswald
(United States) Denis Kudla (United States) Tim Smyczek	w/o

=== Fourth qualifier ===
First round
4	(India) Purav Raja (India) Divij Sharan	6	6
(Italy) Flavio Cipolla (United States) Wayne Odesnik	2	4
(Austria) Andreas Haider-Maurer (Czech Republic) Jiří Veselý	7^{7}	6
6	(United Kingdom) Brydan Klein (Australia) Dane Propoggia	6^{4}	2

Qualifying competition
4	(India) Purav Raja (India) Divij Sharan
(Austria) Andreas Haider-Maurer (Czech Republic) Jiří Veselý	w/o
