= 2013 Wimbledon Championships – Women's doubles qualifying =

Women's doubles qualifying
- 2013 Wimbledon Championships

Events
Singles	men	women		boys	girls
Doubles	men	women	mixed	boys	girls
WC Singles	men	women	quad
WC Doubles	men	women	quad
Legends	men	women	seniors

Qualification
Singles	men	women
Doubles	men	women
- Wimbledon Championships

Players and pairs who neither have high enough rankings nor receive wild cards may participate in a qualifying tournament held one week before the annual Wimbledon Tennis Championships. This article concerns the qualifying tournament for women's doubles.

== Seeds ==
1. (France) Stéphanie Foretz Gacon / (Czech Republic) Eva Hrdinová (qualified)
2. (France) Séverine Beltrame / (France) Laura Thorpe (first round)
3. (Russia) Nina Bratchikova / (United States) Julia Cohen (first round)
4. (France) Caroline Garcia / (Slovenia) Andreja Klepač (first round)
5. (Romania) Raluca Olaru / (Ukraine) Olga Savchuk (qualified)
6. (Canada) Gabriela Dabrowski / (Canada) Sharon Fichman (first round)
7. (Colombia) Mariana Duque Mariño / (Brazil) Teliana Pereira (qualifying competition)
8. (Greece) Eleni Daniilidou / (United States) CoCo Vandeweghe (withdrew)

== Qualifiers ==
1. (France) Stéphanie Foretz Gacon / (Czech Republic) Eva Hrdinová
2. (Argentina) María Irigoyen / (Argentina) Paula Ormaechea
3. (Romania) Raluca Olaru / (Ukraine) Olga Savchuk
4. (Russia) Valeriya Solovyeva / (Ukraine) Maryna Zanevska

== Qualifying draw ==
=== First qualifier ===
First round
1	(France) Stéphanie Foretz Gacon (Czech Republic) Eva Hrdinová	6	6
WC	(United Kingdom) Anna Fitzpatrick (United Kingdom) Emily Webley-Smith	1	3
(Japan) Misaki Doi (Portugal) Maria João Koehler	6^{4}	6	3
7	(Colombia) Mariana Duque Mariño (Brazil) Teliana Pereira	7^{7}	4	6

Qualifying competition
1	(France) Stéphanie Foretz Gacon (Czech Republic) Eva Hrdinová	6	3	9
7	(Colombia) Mariana Duque Mariño (Brazil) Teliana Pereira	4	6	7

=== Second qualifier ===
First round
2	(France) Séverine Beltrame (France) Laura Thorpe	3	3
(Argentina) María Irigoyen (Argentina) Paula Ormaechea	6	6
WC	(United Kingdom) Naomi Broady (United Kingdom) Anna Smith	7^{7}	6
6	(Canada) Gabriela Dabrowski (Canada) Sharon Fichman	6^{3}	4

Qualifying competition
(Argentina) María Irigoyen (Argentina) Paula Ormaechea	7^{7}	6
WC	(United Kingdom) Naomi Broady (United Kingdom) Anna Smith	6^{2}	1

=== Third qualifier ===
First round
3	(Russia) Nina Bratchikova (United States) Julia Cohen	7	5	2
(United States) Jill Craybas (Ukraine) Elina Svitolina	5	7	6
(Russia) Olga Puchkova (United States) Maria Sanchez	6	2	3
5	(Romania) Raluca Olaru (Ukraine) Olga Savchuk	3	6	6

Qualifying competition
(United States) Jill Craybas (Ukraine) Elina Svitolina	3	2
5	(Romania) Raluca Olaru (Ukraine) Olga Savchuk	6	6

=== Fourth qualifier ===
First round
4	(France) Caroline Garcia (Slovenia) Andreja Klepač	4	1
(Russia) Valeriya Solovyeva (Ukraine) Maryna Zanevska	6	6
(France) Julie Coin (Italy) Karin Knapp	6	6
Alt	(Israel) Julia Glushko (United States) Asia Muhammad	3	1

Qualifying competition
(Russia) Valeriya Solovyeva (Ukraine) Maryna Zanevska	6	5	7
(France) Julie Coin (Italy) Karin Knapp	4	7	5
