= 2013 Wimbledon Championships – Women's singles qualifying =

Women's singles qualifying
- 2013 Wimbledon Championships

Events
Singles	men	women		boys	girls
Doubles	men	women	mixed	boys	girls
WC Singles	men	women	quad
WC Doubles	men	women	quad
Legends	men	women	seniors

Qualification
Singles	men	women
Doubles	men	women
- Wimbledon Championships

Players and pairs who neither have high enough rankings nor receive wild cards may participate in a qualifying tournament held one week before the annual Wimbledon Tennis Championships.

== Seeds ==
1. (Argentina) Paula Ormaechea (second round)
2. (Kazakhstan) Galina Voskoboeva (qualified)
3. (France) Caroline Garcia (qualified)
4. (Slovenia) Polona Hercog (second round)
5. (Greece) Eleni Daniilidou (second round, retired)
6. (Canada) Sharon Fichman (first round)
7. (Austria) Yvonne Meusburger (qualified)
8. (Thailand) Luksika Kumkhum (first round)
9. (Germany) Dinah Pfizenmaier (first round)
10. (United States) Vania King (qualifying competition, lucky loser)
11. (Colombia) Mariana Duque Mariño (qualified)
12. (United States) Maria Sanchez (second round)
13. (Australia) Anastasia Rodionova (first round)
14. (United States) Jessica Pegula (first round, retired)
15. (Brazil) Teliana Pereira (second round)
16. (Slovakia) Anna Karolína Schmiedlová (qualifying competition, lucky loser)
17. (Czech Republic) Barbora Záhlavová-Strýcová (qualified)
18. (Kazakhstan) Sesil Karatantcheva (qualifying competition)
19. (Portugal) Michelle Larcher de Brito (qualified)
20. (Israel) Julia Glushko (qualifying competition)
21. (Ukraine) Maryna Zanevska (first round)
22. (Japan) Kurumi Nara (qualifying competition)
23. (Slovenia) Tadeja Majerič (second round)
24. (Italy) Nastassja Burnett (qualifying competition)

== Qualifiers ==
1. (Germany) Carina Witthöft
2. (Kazakhstan) Galina Voskoboeva
3. (France) Caroline Garcia
4. (Czech Republic) Petra Cetkovská
5. (Croatia) Ajla Tomljanović
6. (Italy) Maria Elena Camerin
7. (Austria) Yvonne Meusburger
8. (France) Virginie Razzano
9. (Czech Republic) Eva Birnerová
10. (Czech Republic) Barbora Záhlavová-Strýcová
11. (Colombia) Mariana Duque Mariño
12. (Portugal) Michelle Larcher de Brito

== Lucky losers ==
1. (United States) Vania King
2. (Slovakia) Anna Karolína Schmiedlová

== Qualifying draw ==
=== First qualifier ===
First round
1	(Argentina) Paula Ormaechea	1	6	6
(Thailand) Varatchaya Wongteanchai	6	2	4
(Australia) Casey Dellacqua	6	6
(Russia) Valeriya Solovyeva	4	2
(Germany) Carina Witthöft	6	3	6
(Ukraine) Nadiia Kichenok	4	6	4
(Japan) Erika Sema	6	4	7
13	(Australia) Anastasia Rodionova	4	6	5

Second round
1	(Argentina) Paula Ormaechea	2	1
(Australia) Casey Dellacqua	6	6
(Germany) Carina Witthöft	4	6	6
(Japan) Erika Sema	6	1	4

Qualifying competition
(Australia) Casey Dellacqua	7	3	4
(Germany) Carina Witthöft	5	6	6

=== Second qualifier ===
First round
2	(Kazakhstan) Galina Voskoboeva	7	6^{5}	6
(France) Irena Pavlovic	5	7^{7}	1
(Germany) Anna-Lena Friedsam	7^{7}	6
(Colombia) Catalina Castaño	6^{4}	4
(Russia) Vera Dushevina	6	6
(Ukraine) Lyudmyla Kichenok	2	0
WC	(United Kingdom) Katy Dunne	3	2
24	(Italy) Nastassja Burnett	6	6

Second round
2	(Kazakhstan) Galina Voskoboeva	6	6
(Germany) Anna-Lena Friedsam	1	4
(Russia) Vera Dushevina	2	1
24	(Italy) Nastassja Burnett	6	6

Qualifying competition
2	(Kazakhstan) Galina Voskoboeva	3	6	6
24	(Italy) Nastassja Burnett	6	2	4

=== Third qualifier ===
First round
3	(France) Caroline Garcia	6	6
(Paraguay) Verónica Cepede Royg	3	1
WC	(United Kingdom) Naomi Broady	6	7^{7}
(Canada) Stéphanie Dubois	2	6^{4}
(Thailand) Nudnida Luangnam	3	1
(Australia) Sacha Jones	6	6
(Germany) Anne Schäfer	1	2
22	(Japan) Kurumi Nara	6	6

Second round
3	(France) Caroline Garcia	7^{8}	7^{7}
WC	(United Kingdom) Naomi Broady	6^{6}	6^{3}
(Australia) Sacha Jones	3	3
22	(Japan) Kurumi Nara	6	6

Qualifying competition
3	(France) Caroline Garcia	6	7
22	(Japan) Kurumi Nara	1	5

=== Fourth qualifier ===
First round
4	(Slovenia) Polona Hercog	6	6
(United States) Julia Cohen	2	1
(Australia) Olivia Rogowska	5	2
(Czech Republic) Petra Cetkovská	7	6
(United States) Grace Min	6	6
(Liechtenstein) Stephanie Vogt	3	2
WC	(United Kingdom) Emily Webley-Smith	3	3
23	(Slovenia) Tadeja Majerič	6	6

Second round
4	(Slovenia) Polona Hercog	6^{4}	3
(Czech Republic) Petra Cetkovská	7^{7}	6
(United States) Grace Min	6	5	6
23	(Slovenia) Tadeja Majerič	3	7	0

Qualifying competition
(Czech Republic) Petra Cetkovská	6	6
(United States) Grace Min	0	2

=== Fifth qualifier ===
First round
5	(Greece) Eleni Daniilidou	4	7^{7}	6
(Russia) Alexandra Panova	6	6^{4}	4
(United States) Irina Falconi	6	6
(Ukraine) Kateryna Kozlova	2	1
(Croatia) Ajla Tomljanović	7	7
(Russia) Daria Gavrilova	5	5
(Turkey) Çağla Büyükakçay	6	5
14	(United States) Jessica Pegula	2	4^{r}

Second round
5	(Greece) Eleni Daniilidou	1	0^{r}
(United States) Irina Falconi	6	2
(Croatia) Ajla Tomljanović	6	7^{7}
(Turkey) Çağla Büyükakçay	2	6^{0}

Qualifying competition
(United States) Irina Falconi	4	4
(Croatia) Ajla Tomljanović	6	6

=== Sixth qualifier ===
First round
6	(Canada) Sharon Fichman	3	7^{7}	2
(Romania) Andreea Mitu	6	6^{3}	6
(Italy) Maria Elena Camerin	6	7
(Ukraine) Olga Savchuk	4	5
(Japan) Yurika Sema	6	6
(Argentina) María Irigoyen	3	0
(Romania) Raluca Olaru	3	4
20	(Israel) Julia Glushko	6	6

Second round
(Romania) Andreea Mitu	1	1
(Italy) Maria Elena Camerin	6	6
(Japan) Yurika Sema	6	3	4
20	(Israel) Julia Glushko	1	6	6

Qualifying competition
(Italy) Maria Elena Camerin	6	6
20	(Israel) Julia Glushko	3	1

=== Seventh qualifier ===
First round
7	(Austria) Yvonne Meusburger	6	6
(United States) Nicole Gibbs	3	1
(Thailand) Tamarine Tanasugarn	7^{7}	6
(Serbia) Jovana Jakšić	6^{5}	3
(Croatia) Tereza Mrdeža	4	4
WC	(United Kingdom) Jade Windley	6	6
(Czech Republic) Sandra Záhlavová	6	5	4
18	(Kazakhstan) Sesil Karatantcheva	1	7	6

Second round
7	(Austria) Yvonne Meusburger	6	6
(Thailand) Tamarine Tanasugarn	4	2
WC	(United Kingdom) Jade Windley	4	1
18	(Kazakhstan) Sesil Karatantcheva	6	6

Qualifying competition
7	(Austria) Yvonne Meusburger	7^{7}	3	6
18	(Kazakhstan) Sesil Karatantcheva	6^{5}	6	2

=== Eighth qualifier ===
First round
8	(Thailand) Luksika Kumkhum	7	3	5
(France) Virginie Razzano	5	6	7
(Tunisia) Ons Jabeur	6	4	3
(Russia) Alla Kudryavtseva	2	6	6
(Hungary) Gréta Arn	6	3	8
(France) Julie Coin	4	6	10
(Italy) Corinna Dentoni	6	3	9
21	(Ukraine) Maryna Zanevska	4	6	7

Second round
(France) Virginie Razzano	7	6
(Russia) Alla Kudryavtseva	5	2
(France) Julie Coin	4	3
(Italy) Corinna Dentoni	6	6

Qualifying competition
(France) Virginie Razzano	6	6
(Italy) Corinna Dentoni	1	4

=== Ninth qualifier ===
First round
9	(Germany) Dinah Pfizenmaier	6	3	3
(Austria) Patricia Mayr-Achleitner	4	6	6
(Czech Republic) Eva Birnerová	7	3
(Bosnia and Herzegovina) Mervana Jugić-Salkić	5	0^{r}
(United States) Madison Brengle	3	6	4
(Switzerland) Timea Bacsinszky	6	1	6
WC	(United Kingdom) Anna Smith	2	4
16	(Slovakia) Anna Karolína Schmiedlová	6	6

Second round
(Austria) Patricia Mayr-Achleitner	w/o
(Czech Republic) Eva Birnerová
(Switzerland) Timea Bacsinszky	1	6	5
16	(Slovakia) Anna Karolína Schmiedlová	6	3	7

Qualifying competition
(Czech Republic) Eva Birnerová	6	7
16	(Slovakia) Anna Karolína Schmiedlová	4	5

=== Tenth qualifier ===
First round
10	(United States) Vania King	6	7^{7}
WC	(United Kingdom) Lisa Whybourn	1	6^{5}
(United States) Samantha Crawford	6	7
(United States) Chiara Scholl	2	5
(France) Stéphanie Foretz Gacon	6	6
(Australia) Ashleigh Barty	2	0
(Poland) Paula Kania	2	6^{2}
17	(Czech Republic) Barbora Záhlavová-Strýcová	6	7^{7}

Second round
10	(United States) Vania King	6	6
(United States) Samantha Crawford	4	4
(France) Stéphanie Foretz Gacon	2	4
17	(Czech Republic) Barbora Záhlavová-Strýcová	6	6

Qualifying competition
10	(United States) Vania King	2	4
17	(Czech Republic) Barbora Záhlavová-Strýcová	6	6

=== Eleventh qualifier ===
First round
11	(Colombia) Mariana Duque Mariño	4	6	6
(France) Aravane Rezaï	6	3	4
(Russia) Ekaterina Bychkova	4	4
(Belgium) Alison Van Uytvanck	6	6
(United States) Shelby Rogers	3	6	4
(Belgium) An-Sophie Mestach	6	0	6
WC	(United Kingdom) Amanda Carreras	2	5
15	(Brazil) Teliana Pereira	6	7

Second round
11	(Colombia) Mariana Duque Mariño	3	6	6
(Belgium) Alison Van Uytvanck	6	3	3
(Belgium) An-Sophie Mestach	6^{4}	7	6
15	(Brazil) Teliana Pereira	7^{7}	5	1

Qualifying competition
11	(Colombia) Mariana Duque Mariño	6^{4}	6	8
(Belgium) An-Sophie Mestach	7^{7}	3	6

=== Twelfth qualifier ===
First round
12	(United States) Maria Sanchez	7	6
(Croatia) Ana Vrljić	5	1
WC	(United Kingdom) Melanie South	2	0
(Israel) Shahar Pe'er	6	6
(France) Claire Feuerstein	6	6^{7}	6
(Poland) Magda Linette	2	7^{9}	2
(South Africa) Chanel Simmonds	3	1
19	(Portugal) Michelle Larcher de Brito	6	6

Second round
12	(United States) Maria Sanchez	3	2
(Israel) Shahar Pe'er	6	6
(France) Claire Feuerstein	1	2
19	(Portugal) Michelle Larcher de Brito	6	6

Qualifying competition
(Israel) Shahar Pe'er	3	0
19	(Portugal) Michelle Larcher de Brito	6	6
