= 2013 Wimbledon Championships – Day-by-day summaries =

The 2013 Wimbledon Championships are described below in detail, in the form of day-by-day summaries.

== Day-by-day summaries ==
=== Day 1 (24 June) ===
- Seeds out:
  - Gentlemen's Singles: (Spain) Rafael Nadal [5], (Switzerland) Stan Wawrinka [11], (Serbia) Janko Tipsarević [14], (Italy) Fabio Fognini [30]
  - Ladies' Singles: (Italy) Sara Errani [5], (United States) Varvara Lepchenko [26]
- Schedule

Matches on main courts
Matches on Centre Court
Event	Winner	Loser	Score
Gentlemen's Singles 1st Round	(Switzerland) Roger Federer [3]	(Romania) Victor Hănescu	6–3, 6–2, 6–0
Ladies' Singles 1st Round	(Russia) Maria Sharapova [3]	(France) Kristina Mladenovic	7–6^{(7–5)}, 6–3
Gentlemen's Singles 1st Round	(United Kingdom) Andy Murray [2]	(Germany) Benjamin Becker	6–4, 6–3, 6–2
Ladies' Singles 1st Round	(Spain) Garbiñe Muguruza	(United Kingdom) Anne Keothavong [WC]	6–4, 6–0
Matches on No. 1 Court
Event	Winner	Loser	Score
Ladies' Singles 1st Round	(Belarus) Victoria Azarenka [2]	(Portugal) Maria João Koehler	6–1, 6–2
Gentlemen's Singles 1st Round	(Belgium) Steve Darcis	(Spain) Rafael Nadal [5]	7–6^{(7–4)}, 7–6^{(10–8)}, 6–4
Gentlemen's Singles 1st Round	(Australia) Lleyton Hewitt	(Switzerland) Stan Wawrinka [11]	6–4, 7–5, 6–3
Matches on No. 2 Court
Event	Winner	Loser	Score
Ladies' Singles 1st Round	(Serbia) Ana Ivanovic [12]	(France) Virginie Razzano [Q]	7–6^{(7–1)}, 6–0
Gentlemen's Singles 1st Round	(Croatia) Marin Čilić [10]	(Cyprus) Marcos Baghdatis	6–3, 6–4, 6–4
Gentlemen's Singles 1st Round	(France) Jo-Wilfried Tsonga [6]	(Belgium) David Goffin	7–6^{(7–4)}, 6–4, 6–3
Ladies' Singles 1st Round	(Czech Republic) Petra Kvitová [8]	(United States) Coco Vandeweghe	6–1, 5–7, 6–4
Matches on No. 3 Court
Event	Winner	Loser	Score
Ladies' Singles 1st Round	(Italy) Flavia Pennetta	(United Kingdom) Elena Baltacha [WC]	6–4, 6–1
Gentlemen's Singles 1st Round	(Poland) Jerzy Janowicz [24]	(United Kingdom) Kyle Edmund [WC]	6–2, 6–2, 6–4
Gentlemen's Singles 3rd Round	(Serbia) Victor Troicki	(Serbia) Janko Tipsarević [14]	6–3, 6–4, 7–6^{(7–5)}
Ladies' Singles 1st Round	(Denmark) Caroline Wozniacki [9]	(Spain) Estrella Cabeza Candela	6–0, 6–2
Ladies' Singles 1st Round	(Germany) Andrea Petkovic [WC]	(France) Pauline Parmentier	6–3, 6–2

=== Day 2 (25 June) ===
- Seeds out:
  - Gentlemen's Singles: (Germany) Philipp Kohlschreiber [16], (France) Gilles Simon [19], (United States) Sam Querrey [21]
  - Ladies' Singles: (Russia) Maria Kirilenko [10], (Russia) Nadia Petrova [13], (Russia) Anastasia Pavlyuchenkova [21], (Austria) Tamira Paszek [28], (Switzerland) Romina Oprandi [31]
- Schedule

Matches on main courts
Matches on Centre Court
Event	Winner	Loser	Score
Ladies' Singles 1st Round	(United States) Serena Williams [1]	(Luxembourg) Mandy Minella	6–1, 6–3
Gentlemen's Singles 1st Round	(Serbia) Novak Djokovic [1]	(Germany) Florian Mayer	6–3, 7–5, 6–4
Gentlemen's Singles 1st Round	(Spain) David Ferrer [4]	(Argentina) Martín Alund	6–1, 4–6, 7–5, 6–2
Matches on No. 1 Court
Event	Winner	Loser	Score
Gentlemen's Singles 1st Round	(Argentina) Juan Martín del Potro [8]	(Spain) Albert Ramos Viñolas	6–2, 7–5, 6–1
Ladies' Singles 1st Round	(United Kingdom) Laura Robson	(Russia) Maria Kirilenko [10]	6–3, 6–4
Gentlemen's Singles 1st Round	(Czech Republic) Tomáš Berdych [6]	(Slovakia) Martin Kližan	6–3, 6–4, 6–4
Ladies' Singles 1st Round	(Germany) Sabine Lisicki [23]	(Italy) Francesca Schiavone	6–1, 6–2
Matches on No. 2 Court
Event	Winner	Loser	Score
Ladies' Singles 1st Round	(United States) Madison Keys	(United Kingdom) Heather Watson	6–3, 7–5
Gentlemen's Singles 1st Round	(Germany) Tommy Haas [13]	(Russia) Dmitry Tursunov	6–3, 7–5, 7–5
Gentlemen's Singles 1st Round	(France) Richard Gasquet [9]	(Spain) Marcel Granollers	6–7^{(2–7)}, 6–4, 7–5, 6–4
Ladies' Singles 1st Round	(Poland) Agnieszka Radwańska [4]	(Austria) Yvonne Meusburger	6–1, 6–1
Matches on No. 3 Court
Event	Winner	Loser	Score
Ladies' Singles 1st Round	(Australia) Samantha Stosur [14]	(Slovakia) Anna Karolína Schmiedlová [LL]	6–1, 6–3
Gentlemen's Singles 1st Round	(Australia) Bernard Tomic	(United States) Sam Querrey [21]	7–6^{(8–6)}, 7–6^{(7–3)}, 3–6, 2–6, 6–3
Ladies' Singles 1st Round	(Germany) Angelique Kerber [7]	(United States) Bethanie Mattek-Sands	6–3, 6–4
Gentlemen's Singles 1st Round	(Spain) Feliciano López	(France) Gilles Simon [19]	6–2, 6–4, 7–6^{(13–11)}

=== Day 3 (26 June) ===
- Seeds out:
  - Gentlemen's Singles: (Switzerland) Roger Federer [3], (France) Jo-Wilfried Tsonga [6], (Croatia) Marin Čilić [10], (United States) John Isner [18], (France) Julien Benneteau [31]
  - Ladies' Singles: (Belarus) Victoria Azarenka [2], (Russia) Maria Sharapova [3], (Denmark) Caroline Wozniacki [9], (Serbia) Ana Ivanovic [12], (Serbia) Jelena Janković [16], (Romania) Sorana Cîrstea [22], (Czech Republic) Lucie Šafářová [27]
  - Gentlemen's Doubles: (Spain) Marcel Granollers / (Spain) Marc López [2]
- Schedule

Matches on main courts
Matches on Centre Court
Event	Winner	Loser	Score
Ladies' Singles 2nd Round	(Italy) Flavia Pennetta	(Belarus) Victoria Azarenka [2]	Walkover
Ladies' Singles 2nd Round	(Canada) Eugenie Bouchard	(Serbia) Ana Ivanovic [12]	6–3, 6–3
Gentlemen's Singles 2nd Round	(Latvia) Ernests Gulbis	(France) Jo-Wilfried Tsonga [6]	3–6, 6–3, 6–3, retired
Gentlemen's Singles 2nd Round	(Ukraine) Sergiy Stakhovsky	(Switzerland) Roger Federer [3]	6–7^{(5–7)}, 7–6^{(7–5)}, 7–5, 7–6^{(7–5)}
Matches on No. 1 Court
Event	Winner	Loser	Score
Gentlemen's Singles 2nd Round	(Spain) Fernando Verdasco	(France) Julien Benneteau [31]	7–6^{(7–1)}, 7–6^{(7–4)}, 6–4
Gentlemen's Singles 2nd Round	(United Kingdom) Andy Murray [2]	(Chinese Taipei) Lu Yen-hsun	6–3, 6–3, 7–5
Ladies' Singles 2nd Round	(Czech Republic) Petra Kvitová [8]	(Kazakhstan) Yaroslava Shvedova	Walkover
Ladies' Singles 2nd Round	(Serbia) Vesna Dolonc	(Serbia) Jelena Janković [16]	7–5, 6–2
Matches on No. 2 Court
Event	Winner	Loser	Score
Gentlemen's Singles 2nd Round	(Germany) Dustin Brown [Q]	(Australia) Lleyton Hewitt	6–4, 6–4, 6–7^{(3–7)}, 6–2
Ladies' Singles 2nd Round	(Czech Republic) Petra Cetkovská [Q]	(Denmark) Caroline Wozniacki [9]	6–2, 6–2
Ladies' Singles 2nd Round	(Portugal) Michelle Larcher de Brito [Q]	(Russia) Maria Sharapova [3]	6–3, 6–4
Gentlemen's Singles 2nd Round	(France) Kenny de Schepper	(Croatia) Marin Čilić [10]	Walkover
Ladies' Singles 2nd Round	(Belgium) Kirsten Flipkens [20]	(Serbia) Bojana Jovanovski	6–4, 6–4
Matches on No. 3 Court
Event	Winner	Loser	Score
Gentlemen's Singles 2nd Round	(France) Adrian Mannarino	(United States) John Isner [18]	1–1, retired
Gentlemen's Singles 3rd Round	(Spain) Nicolás Almagro [15]	(France) Guillaume Rufin	7–5, 6–7^{(6–8)}, 6–3, 6–4
Ladies' Singles 2nd Round	(United States) Sloane Stephens [17]	(Germany) Andrea Petkovic [WC]	7–6^{(7–2)}, 2–6, 8–6
Ladies' Singles 3rd Round	(France) Marion Bartoli [15]	(United States) Christina McHale	7–5, 6–4

=== Day 4 (27 June) ===
- Seeds out:
  - Gentlemen's Singles: (Canada) Milos Raonic [17]
  - Ladies' Singles: (China) Peng Shuai [24], (Germany) Mona Barthel [30]
  - Ladies' Doubles: (Russia) Anastasia Pavlyuchenkova / (Czech Republic) Lucie Šafářová [9], (Chinese Taipei) Chan Hao-ching / (Spain) Anabel Medina Garrigues [15]
- Schedule

Matches on main courts
Matches on Centre Court
Event	Winner	Loser	Score
Gentlemen's Singles 2nd Round	(Argentina) Juan Martín del Potro [8]	(Canada) Jesse Levine	6–2, 7–6^{(9–7)}, 6–3
Ladies' Singles 2nd Round	(Poland) Agnieszka Radwańska [4]	(France) Mathilde Johansson	6–1, 6–3
Gentlemen's Singles 2nd Round	(Serbia) Novak Djokovic [1]	(United States) Bobby Reynolds [Q]	7–6^{(7–2)}, 6–3, 6–1
Matches on No. 1 Court
Event	Winner	Loser	Score
Ladies' Singles 2nd Round	(United States) Serena Williams [1]	(France) Caroline Garcia [Q]	6–3, 6–2
Gentlemen's Singles 2nd Round	(France) Richard Gasquet [9]	(Japan) Go Soeda [Q]	6–0, 6–3, 6–7^{(5–7)}, 6–3
Matches on No. 2 Court
Event	Winner	Loser	Score
Ladies' Singles 2nd Round	(Germany) Sabine Lisicki [23]	(Russia) Elena Vesnina	6–3, 6–1
Gentlemen's Singles 2nd Round	(Czech Republic) Tomáš Berdych [7]	(Germany) Daniel Brands	7–6^{(8–6)}, 6–4, 6–2
Ladies' Singles 2nd Round	(New Zealand) Marina Erakovic	(China) Peng Shuai [24]	7–6^{(8–6)}, 6–2
Matches on No. 3 Court
Event	Winner	Loser	Score
Ladies' Singles 2nd Round	(China) Li Na [6]	(Romania) Simona Halep	6–2, 1–6, 6–0
Gentlemen's Singles 2nd Round	(Bulgaria) Grigor Dimitrov [29] vs. (Slovenia) Grega Žemlja		6–3, 6–7^{(4–7)}, 6–3, 4–6, 8–9, suspended

=== Day 5 (28 June) ===
- Seeds out:
  - Gentlemen's Singles: (Spain) Nicolás Almagro [15], (Bulgaria) Grigor Dimitrov [29], (Spain) Tommy Robredo [32]
  - Ladies' Singles: (Germany) Angelique Kerber [7], (France) Alizé Cornet [29]
  - Ladies' Doubles: (France) Kristina Mladenovic / (Kazakhstan) Galina Voskoboeva [10], (Slovakia) Daniela Hantuchová / (Russia) Maria Kirilenko [14]
- Schedule

Matches on main courts
Matches on Centre Court
Event	Winner	Loser	Score
Ladies' Singles 2nd Round	(United Kingdom) Laura Robson	(Colombia) Mariana Duque Mariño [Q]	6–4, 6–1
Gentlemen's Singles 3rd Round	(Poland) Jerzy Janowicz [24]	(Spain) Nicolás Almagro [15]	7–6^{(8–6)}, 6–3, 6–4
Gentlemen's Singles 3rd Round	(United Kingdom) Andy Murray [2]	(Spain) Tommy Robredo [32]	6–2, 6–4, 7–5
Matches on No. 1 Court
Event	Winner	Loser	Score
Gentlemen's Singles 2nd Round	(Spain) David Ferrer [4]	(Spain) Roberto Bautista Agut	6–3, 3–6, 7–6^{(7–4)}, 7–5
Ladies' Singles 3rd Round	(Czech Republic) Petra Kvitová [8] vs. (Russia) Ekaterina Makarova [25]		6–3, 2–6, 1–2, suspended
Matches on No. 2 Court
Event	Winner	Loser	Score
Ladies' Singles 2nd Round	(Estonia) Kaia Kanepi	(Germany) Angelique Kerber [7]	3–6, 7–6^{(8–6)}, 6–3
Ladies' Singles 3rd Round	(France) Marion Bartoli [15]	(Italy) Camila Giorgi	6–4, 7–5
Matches on No. 3 Court
Event	Winner	Loser	Score
Gentlemen's Singles 2nd Round	(Slovenia) Grega Žemlja	(Bulgaria) Grigor Dimitrov [29]	3–6, 7–6^{(7–4)}, 3–6, 6–4, 11–9
Gentlemen's Singles 3rd Round	(Austria) Jürgen Melzer	(Ukraine) Sergiy Stakhovsky	6–2, 2–6, 7–5, 6–3
Ladies' Singles 3rd Round	(United States) Sloane Stephens [17] vs. (Czech Republic) Petra Cetkovská [Q]		7–6^{(7–3)}, 0–6, suspended

=== Day 6 (29 June) ===
- Seeds out:
  - Gentlemen's Singles: (France) Richard Gasquet [9], (Japan) Kei Nishikori [12], (Argentina) Juan Mónaco [22], (France) Benoît Paire [25], (Ukraine) Alexandr Dolgopolov [26], (South Africa) Kevin Anderson [27], (France) Jérémy Chardy [28]
  - Ladies' Singles: (Australia) Samantha Stosur [14], (Slovakia) Dominika Cibulková [18], (Russia) Ekaterina Makarova [25], (Czech Republic) Klára Zakopalová [32]
  - Gentlemen's Doubles: (Mexico) Santiago González / (United States) Scott Lipsky [10]
  - Ladies' Doubles: (Zimbabwe) Cara Black / (New Zealand) Marina Erakovic [11]
- Schedule

Matches on main courts
Matches on Centre Court
Event	Winner	Loser	Score
Gentlemen's Singles 3rd Round	(Australia) Bernard Tomic	(France) Richard Gasquet [9]	7–6^{(9–7)}, 5–7, 7–5, 7–6^{(7–5)}
Ladies' Singles 3rd Round	(Germany) Sabine Lisicki [23]	(Australia) Samantha Stosur [14]	4–6, 6–2, 6–1
Gentlemen's Singles 3rd Round	(Serbia) Novak Djokovic [1]	(France) Jérémy Chardy [28]	6–3, 6–2, 6–2
Ladies' Singles 3rd Round	(United States) Serena Williams [1]	(Japan) Kimiko Date-Krumm	6–2, 6–0
Matches on No. 1 Court
Event	Winner	Loser	Score
Ladies' Singles 3rd Round	(Czech Republic) Petra Kvitová [8]	(Russia) Ekaterina Makarova [25]	6–3, 2–6, 6–3
Gentlemen's Singles 3rd Round	(Czech Republic) Tomáš Berdych [7]	(South Africa) Kevin Anderson [27]	3–6, 6–3, 6–4, 7–5
Gentlemen's Singles 3rd Round	(Spain) David Ferrer [4]	(Ukraine) Alexandr Dolgopolov [26]	6–7^{(6–8)}, 7–6^{(7–2)}, 2–6, 6–1, 6–2
Matches on No. 2 Court
Event	Winner	Loser	Score
Gentlemen's Singles 3rd Round	(Russia) Mikhail Youzhny [20]	(Serbia) Victor Troicki	6–3, 6–4, 7–5
Ladies' Singles 3rd Round	(United Kingdom) Laura Robson	(New Zealand) Marina Erakovic	1–6, 7–5, 6–3
Gentlemen's Singles 3rd Round	(Germany) Tommy Haas [13]	(Spain) Feliciano López	4–6, 6–2, 7–5, 6–4
Ladies' Doubles 2nd Round	(Germany) Anna-Lena Grönefeld [7] (Czech Republic) Květa Peschke [7]	(United States) Lisa Raymond (United Kingdom) Laura Robson	6–4, 6–4
Matches on No. 3 Court
Event	Winner	Loser	Score
Gentlemen's Singles 3rd Round	(Spain) Fernando Verdasco	(Latvia) Ernests Gulbis	6–2, 6–4, 6–4
Ladies' Singles 3rd Round	(United States) Sloane Stephens [17]	(Czech Republic) Petra Cetkovská [Q]	7–6^{(7–3)}, 0–6, 6–4
Ladies' Singles 3rd Round	(Poland) Agnieszka Radwańska [4]	(United States) Madison Keys	7–5, 4–6, 6–3
Ladies' Singles 3rd Round	(China) Li Na [6]	(Romania) Klára Zakopalová [32]	4–6, 6–0, 8–6
Mixed Doubles 1st Round	(Netherlands) Jean-Julien Rojer / (Russia) Vera Dushevina vs. (United Kingdom) Jamie Murray / (Chinese Taipei) Hsieh Su-wei		6–7^{(2–7)}, 6–3, 5–3, suspended

=== Middle Sunday (30 June) ===
Following tradition, Middle Sunday is a day of rest, with no matches scheduled.

=== Day 7 (1 July) ===
- Seeds out:
  - Gentlemen's Singles: (Germany) Tommy Haas [13], (Russia) Mikhail Youzhny [20], (Italy) Andreas Seppi [23]
  - Ladies' Singles: (United States) Serena Williams [1], (Italy) Roberta Vinci [11], (Spain) Carla Suárez Navarro [19]
  - Gentlemen's Doubles: (Austria) Alexander Peya / (Brazil) Bruno Soares [3], (Pakistan) Aisam-ul-Haq Qureshi / (Netherlands) Jean-Julien Rojer [5], (Belarus) Max Mirnyi / (Romania) Horia Tecău [7], (United Kingdom) Colin Fleming / (United Kingdom) Jonathan Marray [9], (France) Michaël Llodra / (France) Nicolas Mahut [13], (Poland) Łukasz Kubot / (Poland) Marcin Matkowski [15], (Philippines) Treat Huey / (United Kingdom) Dominic Inglot [16]
  - Ladies' Doubles: (Russia) Ekaterina Makarova / (Russia) Elena Vesnina [4], (United States) Raquel Kops-Jones / (United States) Abigail Spears [5], (United States) Liezel Huber / (India) Sania Mirza [6], (United States) Vania King / (China) Zheng Jie [13]
  - Mixed Doubles: (Czech Republic) František Čermák / (Czech Republic) Lucie Hradecká [12]
- Schedule

Matches on main courts
Matches on Centre Court
Event	Winner	Loser	Score
Ladies' Singles 4th Round	(Germany) Sabine Lisicki [23]	(United States) Serena Williams [1]	6–2, 1–6, 6–4
Gentlemen's Singles 4th Round	(United Kingdom) Andy Murray [2]	(Russia) Mikhail Youzhny [20]	6–4, 7–6^{(7–5)}, 6–1
Gentlemen's Singles 4th Round	(Serbia) Novak Djokovic [1]	(Germany) Tommy Haas [13]	6–1, 6–4, 7–6^{(7–4)}
Matches on No. 1 Court
Event	Winner	Loser	Score
Ladies' Singles 4th Round	(Estonia) Kaia Kanepi	(United Kingdom) Laura Robson	7–6^{(8–6)}, 7–5
Gentlemen's Singles 4th Round	(Argentina) Juan Martín del Potro [8]	(Italy) Andreas Seppi [23]	6–4, 7–6^{(7–2)}, 6–3
Gentlemen's Singles 4th Round	(Czech Republic) Tomáš Berdych [7]	(Australia) Bernard Tomic	7–6^{(7–4)}, 6–7^{(5–7)}, 6–4, 6–4
Matches on No. 2 Court
Event	Winner	Loser	Score
Gentlemen's Singles 4th Round	(Spain) David Ferrer [4]	(Croatia) Ivan Dodig	6–7^{(3–7)}, 7–6^{(8–6)}, 6–1, 6–1
Ladies' Singles 4th Round	(Poland) Agnieszka Radwańska [4]	(Bulgaria) Tsvetana Pironkova	4–6, 6–3, 6–3
Gentlemen's Doubles 3rd Round	(United States) Bob Bryan [1] (United States) Mike Bryan [1]	(Philippines) Treat Huey [16] (United Kingdom) Dominic Inglot [16]	7–5, 6–3, 7–6^{(7–3)}
Matches on No. 3 Court
Event	Winner	Loser	Score
Ladies' Singles 4th Round	(Czech Republic) Petra Kvitová [8]	(Spain) Carla Suárez Navarro [19]	7–6^{(7–5)}, 6–3
Ladies' Singles 4th Round	(China) Li Na [6]	(Italy) Roberta Vinci [11]	6–2, 6–0
Gentlemen's Singles 4th Round	(Spain) Fernando Verdasco	(France) Kenny de Schepper	6–4, 6–4, 6–4
Mixed Doubles 2nd Round	(Spain) David Marrero [14] (Japan) Kimiko Date-Krumm [14]	(United Kingdom) Jonathan Marray (United Kingdom) Heather Watson	2–6, 6–3, 6–3
Mixed Doubles 1st Round	(Netherlands) Jean-Julien Rojer (Russia) Vera Dushevina	(United Kingdom) Jamie Murray (Chinese Taipei) Hsieh Su-wei	6–7^{(2–7)}, 6–3, 6–4

=== Day 8 (2 July) ===
- Seeds out:
  - Ladies' Singles: (China) Li Na [6], (Czech Republic) Petra Kvitová [8], (United States) Sloane Stephens [17]
  - Gentlemen's Doubles: (Sweden) Robert Lindstedt / (Canada) Daniel Nestor [6], (India) Mahesh Bhupathi / (Austria) Julian Knowle [8], (France) Julien Benneteau / (Serbia) Nenad Zimonjić [11]
  - Ladies' Doubles: (Italy) Sara Errani / (Italy) Roberta Vinci [1]
  - Mixed Doubles: (Belarus) Max Mirnyi / (Czech Republic) Andrea Hlaváčková [4], (Philippines) Treat Huey / (United States) Raquel Kops-Jones [9], (India) Leander Paes / (China) Zheng Saisai [15], (Croatia) Ivan Dodig / (New Zealand) Marina Erakovic [16]
- Schedule

Matches on main courts
Matches on Centre Court
Event	Winner	Loser	Score
Ladies' Singles Quarterfinals	(Poland) Agnieszka Radwańska [4]	(China) Li Na [6]	7–6^{(7–5)}, 4–6, 6–2
Ladies' Singles Quarterfinals	(Belgium) Kirsten Flipkens [20]	(Czech Republic) Petra Kvitová [8]	4–6, 6–3, 6–4
Gentlemen's Invitation Doubles Round Robin	(United Kingdom) Greg Rusedski (France) Fabrice Santoro	(Sweden) Jonas Björkman (Australia) Todd Woodbridge	6–3, 7–6^{(7–4)}
Matches on No. 1 Court
Event	Winner	Loser	Score
Ladies' Singles Quarterfinals	(Germany) Sabine Lisicki [23]	(Estonia) Kaia Kanepi	6–3, 6–3
Ladies' Singles Quarterfinals	(France) Marion Bartoli [15]	(United States) Sloane Stephens [17]	6–4, 7–5
Senior Gentlemen's Invitation Doubles Round Robin	(United States) John McEnroe (United States) Patrick McEnroe	(Australia) Peter McNamara (Australia) Paul McNamee	6–1, 6–2
Matches on No. 2 Court
Event	Winner	Loser	Score
Gentlemen's Doubles Quarterfinals	(India) Rohan Bopanna [14] (France) Édouard Roger-Vasselin [14]	(Sweden) Robert Lindstedt [6] (Canada) Daniel Nestor [6]	7–5, 7–6^{(7–3)}, 6–7^{(4–7)}, 6–7^{(3–7)}, 6–2
Mixed Doubles 2nd Round	(Brazil) Bruno Soares [1] (United States) Lisa Raymond [1]	(Slovakia) Filip Polášek (Slovakia) Janette Husárová	6–2, 6–3
Senior Gentlemen's Invitation Doubles Round Robin	(United Kingdom) Jeremy Bates (Sweden) Anders Järryd	(Iran) Mansour Bahrami (France) Henri Leconte	6–1, 6–2
Matches on No. 3 Court
Event	Winner	Loser	Score
Ladies' Doubles 3rd Round	(Germany) Julia Görges [16] (Czech Republic) Barbora Záhlavová-Strýcová [16]	(Italy) Sara Errani [1] (Italy) Roberta Vinci [1]	3–6, 6–3, 6–2
Gentlemen's Doubles Quarterfinals	(India) Leander Paes [4] (Czech Republic) Radek Štěpánek [4]	(France) Julien Benneteau [14] (Serbia) Nenad Zimonjić [14]	4–6, 6–4, 6–3, 6–4
Mixed Doubles 2nd Round	(Romania) Horia Tecău [2] (India) Sania Mirza [2]	(Germany) Martin Emmrich (Germany) Julia Görges	6–3, 6–4

=== Day 9 (3 July) ===
- Seeds out:
  - Gentlemen's Singles: (Spain) David Ferrer [4], (Czech Republic) Tomáš Berdych [7]
  - Ladies' Doubles: (Czech Republic) Andrea Hlaváčková / (Czech Republic) Lucie Hradecká [2], (Russia) Nadia Petrova / (Slovenia) Katarina Srebotnik [3], (Germany) Julia Görges / (Czech Republic) Barbora Záhlavová-Strýcová [16]
  - Mixed Doubles: (Austria) Alexander Peya / (Germany) Anna-Lena Grönefeld [5], (Brazil) Marcelo Melo / (United States) Liezel Huber [6], (Pakistan) Aisam-ul-Haq Qureshi / (Zimbabwe) Cara Black [10], (United States) Scott Lipsky / (Australia) Casey Dellacqua [13], (Spain) David Marrero / (Japan) Kimiko Date-Krumm [14]
- Schedule

Matches on main courts
Matches on Centre Court
Event	Winner	Loser	Score
Gentlemen's Singles Quarterfinals	(Argentina) Juan Martín del Potro [8]	(Spain) David Ferrer [4]	6–2, 6–4, 7–6^{(7–5)}
Gentlemen's Singles Quarterfinals	(United Kingdom) Andy Murray [2]	(Spain) Fernando Verdasco	4–6, 3–6, 6–1, 6–4, 7–5
Matches on No. 1 Court
Event	Winner	Loser	Score
Gentlemen's Singles Quarterfinals	(Serbia) Novak Djokovic [1]	(Czech Republic) Tomáš Berdych [7]	7–6^{(7–5)}, 6–4, 6–3
Gentlemen's Singles Quarterfinals	(Poland) Jerzy Janowicz [24]	(Poland) Łukasz Kubot	7–5, 6–4, 6–4
Gentlemen's Invitation Doubles Round Robin	(United Kingdom) Greg Rusedski (France) Fabrice Santoro	(United States) Justin Gimelstob (United States) Todd Martin	6–1, 4–6, [12–10]
Matches on No. 2 Court
Event	Winner	Loser	Score
Ladies' Doubles Quarterfinals	(Chinese Taipei) Hsieh Su-wei [8] (China) Peng Shuai [8]	(Serbia) Jelena Janković (Croatia) Mirjana Lučić-Baroni	6–4, 7–5
Ladies' Doubles Quarterfinals	(Australia) Ashleigh Barty [12] (Australia) Casey Dellacqua [12]	(Czech Republic) Andrea Hlaváčková [2] (Czech Republic) Lucie Hradecká [2]	2–6, 6–2, 6–4
Mixed Doubles 3rd Round	(Brazil) Bruno Soares [1] (United States) Lisa Raymond [1]	(Denmark) Frederik Nielsen (Sweden) Sofia Arvidsson	6–3, 6–4
Mixed Doubles 3rd Round	(Serbia) Nenad Zimonjić [3] (Slovenia) Katarina Srebotnik [3]	(United States) Scott Lipsky [13] (Australia) Casey Dellacqua [13]	6–2, 6–7^{(3–7)}, 6–2
Ladies' Invitation Doubles Round Robin	(Australia) Rennae Stubbs (Hungary) Andrea Temesvári	(Spain) Conchita Martínez (France) Nathalie Tauziat	6–4, 6–3
Matches on No. 3 Court
Event	Winner	Loser	Score
Senior Gentlemen's Invitation Doubles Round Robin	(United States) John McEnroe (United States) Patrick McEnroe	(Iran) Mansour Bahrami (France) Henri Leconte	6–1, 6–4
Gentlemen's Doubles Quarterfinals	(Croatia) Ivan Dodig [12] (Brazil) Marcelo Melo [12]	(United States) James Blake (Austria) Jürgen Melzer	7–5, 6–0, 6–7^{(0–7)}, 6–4
Mixed Doubles 3rd Round	(Poland) Marcin Matkowski [11] (Czech Republic) Květa Peschke [11]	(Austria) Alexander Peya [5] (Germany) Anna-Lena Grönefeld [5]	6–7^{(3–7)}, 6–4, 6–2
Mixed Doubles 3rd Round	(Australia) John Peers (Australia) Ashleigh Barty	(Brazil) Marcelo Melo [6] (United States) Liezel Huber [6]	6–4, 1–6, 6–2
Gentlemen's Invitation Doubles Round Robin	(Sweden) Thomas Enqvist (Australia) Mark Philippoussis	(South Africa) Wayne Ferreira (United Kingdom) Chris Wilkinson	6–4, 6–4

=== Day 10 (4 July) ===
- Seeds out:
  - Ladies' Singles: (Poland) Agnieszka Radwańska [4], (Belgium) Kirsten Flipkens [20]
  - Gentlemen's Doubles: (India) Leander Paes / (Czech Republic) Radek Štěpánek [4], (India) Rohan Bopanna / (France) Édouard Roger-Vasselin [14]
  - Mixed Doubles: (Romania) Horia Tecău / (India) Sania Mirza [2], (India) Rohan Bopanna / (China) Zheng Jie [7], (Poland) Marcin Matkowski / (Czech Republic) Květa Peschke [11]
- Schedule

Matches on main courts
Matches on Centre Court
Event	Winner	Loser	Score
Ladies' Singles Semifinals	(France) Marion Bartoli [15]	(Belgium) Kirsten Flipkens [20]	6–1, 6–2
Ladies' Singles Semifinals	(Germany) Sabine Lisicki [23]	(Poland) Agnieszka Radwańska [4]	6–4, 2–6, 9–7
Gentlemen's Invitation Doubles Round Robin	(Sweden) Jonas Björkman (Australia) Todd Woodbridge	(Netherlands) Richard Krajicek (United Kingdom) Mark Petchey	7–6^{(7–1)}, 6–2
Senior Gentlemen's Invitation Doubles Round Robin	(United Kingdom) Jeremy Bates (Sweden) Anders Järryd	(United States) John McEnroe (United States) Patrick McEnroe	7–5, 5–7, [10–7]
Matches on No. 1 Court
Event	Winner	Loser	Score
Gentlemen's Doubles Semifinals	(United States) Bob Bryan [1] (United States) Mike Bryan [1]	(India) Rohan Bopanna [14] (France) Édouard Roger-Vasselin [14]	6–7^{(4–7)}, 6–4, 6–3, 5–7, 6–3
Mixed Doubles Quarterfinals	(Canada) Daniel Nestor [8] (France) Kristina Mladenovic [8]	(Romania) Horia Tecău [2] (India) Sania Mirza [2]	7–6^{(7–5)}, 7–6^{(7–5)}
Mixed Doubles Quarterfinals	(Netherlands) Jean-Julien Rojer (Russia) Vera Dushevina	(India) Rohan Bopanna [7] (China) Zheng Jie [7]	6–3, 3–6, 6–3
Matches on No. 2 Court
Event	Winner	Loser	Score
Mixed Doubles Quarterfinals	(Serbia) Nenad Zimonjić [3] (Slovenia) Katarina Srebotnik [3]	(Poland) Marcin Matkowski [11] (Czech Republic) Květa Peschke [11]	7–6^{(12–10)}, 6–7^{(6–8)}, 6–4
Gentlemen's Doubles Semifinals	(Croatia) Ivan Dodig [12] (Brazil) Marcelo Melo [12]	(India) Leander Paes [4] (Czech Republic) Radek Štěpánek [4]	3–6, 6–4, 6–1, 3–6, 6–3
Mixed Doubles Quarterfinals	(Brazil) Bruno Soares [1] (United States) Lisa Raymond [1]	(Australia) John Peers (Australia) Ashleigh Barty	7–6^{(8–6)}, 7–6^{(7–4)}
Senior Gentlemen's Invitation Doubles Round Robin	(Australia) Pat Cash (Australia) Mark Woodforde	(Sweden) Joakim Nyström (Sweden) Mikael Pernfors	6–2, retired
Matches on No. 3 Court
Event	Winner	Loser	Score
Gentlemen's Invitation Doubles Round Robin	(Netherlands) Jacco Eltingh (Netherlands) Paul Haarhuis	(United Kingdom) Barry Cowan (France) Cédric Pioline	7–6^{(7–2)}, 6–2
Boys' Singles Quarterfinals	(United Kingdom) Kyle Edmund [5]	(United States) Stefan Kozlov	4–6, 6–1, 6–3
Ladies' Invitation Doubles Round Robin	(Croatia) Iva Majoli (Belarus) Natasha Zvereva	(United States) Martina Navratilova (United States) Pam Shriver	6–2, 6–3
Ladies' Invitation Doubles Round Robin	(Czech Republic) Jana Novotná (Austria) Barbara Schett	(United Kingdom) Lucie Ahl (Bulgaria) Magdalena Maleeva	6–2, 6–7^{(2–7)}, [10–2]
Ladies' Invitation Doubles Round Robin	(United States) Lindsay Davenport (Switzerland) Martina Hingis	(Australia) Rennae Stubbs (Hungary) Andrea Temesvári	7–5, 6–2

=== Day 11 (5 July) ===
- Seeds out:
  - Gentlemen's Singles: (Argentina) Juan Martín del Potro [8], (Poland) Jerzy Janowicz [24]
  - Ladies' Doubles: (Germany) Anna-Lena Grönefeld / (Czech Republic) Květa Peschke [7]
  - Mixed Doubles: (Serbia) Nenad Zimonjić / (Slovenia) Katarina Srebotnik [3]
- Schedule

Matches on main courts
Matches on Centre Court
Event	Winner	Loser	Score
Gentlemen's Singles Semifinals	(Serbia) Novak Djokovic [1]	(Argentina) Juan Martín del Potro [8]	7–5, 4–6, 7–6^{(7–2)}, 6–7^{(6–8)}, 6–3
Gentlemen's Singles Semifinals	(United Kingdom) Andy Murray [2]	(Poland) Jerzy Janowicz [24]	6–7^{(2–7)}, 6–4, 6–4, 6–3
Matches on No. 1 Court
Event	Winner	Loser	Score
Ladies' Doubles Semifinals	(Australia) Ashleigh Barty [12] (Australia) Casey Dellacqua [12]	(Germany) Anna-Lena Grönefeld [7] (Czech Republic) Květa Peschke [7]	7–6^{(8–6)}, 6–2
Ladies' Doubles Semifinals	(Chinese Taipei) Hsieh Su-wei [8] (China) Peng Shuai [8]	(Japan) Shuko Aoyama (South Africa) Chanelle Scheepers	6–4, 6–3
Mixed Doubles Semifinals	(Brazil) Bruno Soares [1] (United States) Lisa Raymond [1]	(Netherlands) Jean-Julien Rojer (Russia) Vera Dushevina	6–4, 6–4
Gentlemen's Invitation Doubles Round Robin	(United Kingdom) Greg Rusedski (France) Fabrice Santoro	(Netherlands) Richard Krajicek (United Kingdom) Mark Petchey	Walkover
Senior Gentlemen's Invitation Doubles Round Robin	(United Kingdom) Jeremy Bates (Sweden) Anders Järryd	(Australia) Peter McNamara (Australia) Paul McNamee	6–4, 6–2
Matches on No. 3 Court
Event	Winner	Loser	Score
Boys' Singles Semifinals	(Italy) Gianluigi Quinzi [6]	(United Kingdom) Kyle Edmund [5]	6–4, 6–4
Ladies' Invitation Doubles Round Robin	(Czech Republic) Jana Novotná (Austria) Barbara Schett	(United States) Martina Navratilova (United States) Pam Shriver	6–1, 6–4
Mixed Doubles Semifinals	(Canada) Daniel Nestor [8] (France) Kristina Mladenovic [8]	(Serbia) Nenad Zimonjić [3] (Slovenia) Katarina Srebotnik [3]	6–2, 6–7^{(4–7)}, 11–9
Ladies' Invitation Doubles Round Robin	(United States) Tracy Austin (Czech Republic) Helena Suková	(Spain) Conchita Martínez (France) Nathalie Tauziat	6–1, 6–1

=== Day 12 (6 July) ===
- Seeds out:
  - Ladies' Singles: (Germany) Sabine Lisicki [23]
  - Gentlemen's Doubles: (Croatia) Ivan Dodig / (Brazil) Marcelo Melo [12]
  - Ladies' Doubles: (Australia) Ashleigh Barty / (Australia) Casey Dellacqua [12]
- Schedule

Matches on main courts
Matches on Centre Court
Event	Winner	Loser	Score
Ladies' Singles Final	(France) Marion Bartoli [15]	(Germany) Sabine Lisicki [23]	6–1, 6–4
Gentlemen's Doubles Final	(United States) Bob Bryan [1] (United States) Mike Bryan [1]	(Croatia) Ivan Dodig [12] (Brazil) Marcelo Melo [12]	3–6, 6–3, 6–4, 6–4
Ladies' Doubles Final	(Chinese Taipei) Hsieh Su-wei [8] (China) Peng Shuai [8]	(Australia) Ashleigh Barty [12] (Australia) Casey Dellacqua [12]	7–6^{(7–1)}, 6–1
Matches on No. 1 Court
Event	Winner	Loser	Score
Girls' Singles Final	(Switzerland) Belinda Bencic [1]	(United States) Taylor Townsend [5]	4–6, 6–1, 6–4
Gentlemen's Invitation Doubles Round Robin	(United Kingdom) Barry Cowan (France) Cédric Pioline	(South Africa) Wayne Ferreira (United Kingdom) Chris Wilkinson	6–4, 6–2
Boys' Doubles Semifinals	(France) Enzo Couacaud (Italy) Stefano Napolitano	(United Kingdom) Kyle Edmund [1] (Portugal) Frederico Ferreira Silva [1]	6–4, 7–6^{(9–7)}
Gentlemen's Invitation Doubles Round Robin	(United States) Justin Gimelstob (United States) Todd Martin	(Sweden) Jonas Björkman (Australia) Todd Woodbridge	3–6, 6–2, [12–10]
Matches on No. 3 Court
Event	Winner	Loser	Score
Senior Gentlemen's Invitation Doubles Round Robin	(Australia) Peter McNamara (Australia) Paul McNamee	(Iran) Mansour Bahrami (France) Henri Leconte	7–6^{(7–1)}, 6–4
Boys' Doubles Semifinals	(Australia) Thanasi Kokkinakis (Australia) Nick Kyrgios	(Italy) Filippo Baldi (Italy) Matteo Donati	6–4, 3–6, 6–2
Girls' Doubles Semifinals	(Czech Republic) Barbora Krejčíková [1] (Czech Republic) Kateřina Siniaková [1]	(Romania) Ioana Ducu [5] (Serbia) Nina Stojanović [5]	6–3, 6–2
Girls' Doubles Semifinals	(Ukraine) Anhelina Kalinina [8] (Belarus) Iryna Shymanovich [8]	(Switzerland) Belinda Bencic [2] (Slovakia) Petra Uberalová [2]	6–2, 3–6, 6–0
Ladies' Invitation Doubles Round Robin	(United Kingdom) Lucie Ahl (Bulgaria) Magdalena Maleeva	(Croatia) Iva Majoli (Belarus) Natasha Zvereva	6–0, 5–7, [10–8]

=== Day 13 (7 July) ===
- Seeds out:
  - Gentlemen's Singles: (Serbia) Novak Djokovic [1]
  - Mixed Doubles: (Brazil) Bruno Soares / (United States) Lisa Raymond [1]
- Schedule

Matches on main courts
Matches on Centre Court
Event	Winner	Loser	Score
Gentlemen's Singles Final	(United Kingdom) Andy Murray [2]	(Serbia) Novak Djokovic [1]	6–4, 7–5, 6–4
Mixed Doubles Final	(Canada) Daniel Nestor [8] (France) Kristina Mladenovic [8]	(Brazil) Bruno Soares [1] (United States) Lisa Raymond [1]	5–7, 6–2, 8–6
Matches on No. 1 Court
Event	Winner	Loser	Score
Boys' Singles Final	(Italy) Gianluigi Quinzi [6]	(South Korea) Chung Hyeon	7–5, 7–6^{(7–2)}
Senior Gentlemen's Invitation Doubles Final	(Australia) Pat Cash (Australia) Mark Woodforde	(United Kingdom) Jeremy Bates (Sweden) Anders Järryd	6–3, 6–3
Ladies Invitation Doubles Final	(United States) Lindsay Davenport (Switzerland) Martina Hingis	(Czech Republic) Jana Novotná (Austria) Barbara Schett	6–2, 6–2
Gentlemen's Invitation Doubles Final	(Sweden) Thomas Enqvist (Australia) Mark Philippoussis	(United Kingdom) Greg Rusedski (France) Fabrice Santoro	7–6^{(8–6)}, 6–3
Matches on No. 3 Court
Event	Winner	Loser	Score
Girls' Doubles Final	(Czech Republic) Barbora Krejčíková [1] (Czech Republic) Kateřina Siniaková [1]	(Ukraine) Anhelina Kalinina [8] (Belarus) Iryna Shymanovich [8]	6–3, 6–1
Boys' Doubles Final	(Australia) Thanasi Kokkinakis (Australia) Nick Kyrgios	(France) Enzo Couacaud (Italy) Stefano Napolitano	6–2, 6–3
