= 2013 Wimbledon Championships – Wheelchair men's doubles =

Wheelchair men's doubles
- 2013 Wimbledon Championships

Final
- Champions: (France) Stéphane Houdet (Japan) Shingo Kunieda
- Runners-up: (France) Frédéric Cattaneo (Netherlands) Ronald Vink
- Score: 6–4, 6–2

Events
Singles	men	women		boys	girls
Doubles	men	women	mixed	boys	girls
WC Singles	men	women	quad
WC Doubles	men	women	quad
Legends	men	women	seniors
← 2012 ·	Wimbledon Championships	· 2014 →

Stéphane Houdet and Shingo Kunieda defeated Frédéric Cattaneo and Ronald Vink in the final, 6–4, 6–2 to win the gentlemen's doubles wheelchair tennis title at the 2013 Wimbledon Championships.

Tom Egberink and Michaël Jérémiasz were the defending champions, but were defeated by Cattaneo and Vink in the semifinals.

== Seeds ==
1. (France) Stéphane Houdet / (Japan) Shingo Kunieda (champions)
2. (France) Frédéric Cattaneo / (Netherlands) Ronald Vink (final)

== Draw ==
=== Key ===
- Q = Qualifier
- WC = Wild card
- LL = Lucky loser
- Alt = Alternate
- ITF = ITF entry
- PR = Protected ranking
- SR = Special ranking
- SE = Special exempt
- JE = Junior exempt
- JR = Junior Accelerator Programme entrant
- CO = College Accelerator Programme entrant
- NG = Next Gen Accelerator Program entrant
- w/o = Walkover
- r = Retired
- d = Defaulted

=== Finals ===
Semifinals
1	(France) Stéphane Houdet (Japan) Shingo Kunieda	6	6
(United Kingdom) Gordon Reid (Netherlands) Maikel Scheffers	3	3
(Netherlands) Tom Egberink (France) Michaël Jeremiasz	4	6	4
2	(France) Frédéric Cattaneo (Netherlands) Ronald Vink	6	4	6

Final
1	(France) Stéphane Houdet (Japan) Shingo Kunieda	6	6
2	(France) Frédéric Cattaneo (Netherlands) Ronald Vink	4	2
Third place
(United Kingdom) Gordon Reid (Netherlands) Maikel Scheffers	4	3
(Netherlands) Tom Egberink (France) Michaël Jeremiasz	6	6
