= 2013 Wimbledon Championships – Wheelchair women's doubles =

Wheelchair women's doubles
- 2013 Wimbledon Championships

Final
- Champions: (Netherlands) Jiske Griffioen (Netherlands) Aniek van Koot
- Runners-up: (Japan) Yui Kamiji (United Kingdom) Jordanne Whiley
- Score: 6–4, 7–6^{(8–6)}

Events
Singles	men	women		boys	girls
Doubles	men	women	mixed	boys	girls
WC Singles	men	women	quad
WC Doubles	men	women	quad
Legends	men	women	seniors
← 2012 ·	Wimbledon Championships	· 2014 →

Defending champions Jiske Griffioen and Aniek van Koot defeated Yui Kamiji and Jordanne Whiley in the final, 6–4, 7–6^{(8–6)} to win the ladies' doubles wheelchair tennis title at the 2013 Wimbledon Championships. It was their third step towards an eventual Grand Slam.

== Seeds ==
1. (Netherlands) Jiske Griffioen / (Netherlands) Aniek van Koot (champions)
2. (Netherlands) Marjolein Buis / (United Kingdom) Lucy Shuker (semifinals, third place)

== Draw ==
=== Key ===
- Q = Qualifier
- WC = Wild card
- LL = Lucky loser
- Alt = Alternate
- ITF = ITF entry
- PR = Protected ranking
- SR = Special ranking
- SE = Special exempt
- JE = Junior exempt
- JR = Junior Accelerator Programme entrant
- CO = College Accelerator Programme entrant
- NG = Next Gen Accelerator Program entrant
- w/o = Walkover
- r = Retired
- d = Defaulted

=== Finals ===
Semifinals
1	(Netherlands) Jiske Griffioen (Netherlands) Aniek van Koot	6	6
(Germany) Sabine Ellerbrock (Netherlands) Sharon Walraven	3	2
(Japan) Yui Kamiji (United Kingdom) Jordanne Whiley	6	6
2	(Netherlands) Marjolein Buis (United Kingdom) Lucy Shuker	1	2

Final
1	(Netherlands) Jiske Griffioen (Netherlands) Aniek van Koot	6	7^{8}
(Japan) Yui Kamiji (United Kingdom) Jordanne Whiley	4	6^{6}
Third place
(Germany) Sabine Ellerbrock (Netherlands) Sharon Walraven	5	6^{6}
2	(Netherlands) Marjolein Buis (United Kingdom) Lucy Shuker	7	7^{8}
