= 2013 Wimbledon Championships – Mixed doubles =

Mixed doubles
- 2013 Wimbledon Championships

Final
- Champions: (Canada) Daniel Nestor (France) Kristina Mladenovic
- Runners-up: (Brazil) Bruno Soares (United States) Lisa Raymond
- Score: 5–7, 6–2, 8–6

Details
- Draw: 48 (5WC)
- Seeds: 16

Events
Singles	men	women		boys	girls
Doubles	men	women	mixed	boys	girls
WC Singles	men	women	quad
WC Doubles	men	women	quad
Legends	men	women	seniors
- Wimbledon Championships

Mike Bryan and Lisa Raymond were the defending champions, but Bryan decided not to compete to focus on winning the Men's doubles with his brother Bob. Raymond partnered with Bruno Soares.

Daniel Nestor and Kristina Mladenovic defeated Soares and Raymond in the final, 5–7, 6–2, 8–6 to win the mixed doubles tennis title at the 2013 Wimbledon Championships.

== Seeds ==
All seeds received a bye into the second round.

1. (Brazil) Bruno Soares / (United States) Lisa Raymond (final)
2. (Romania) Horia Tecău / (India) Sania Mirza (quarterfinals)
3. (Serbia) Nenad Zimonjić / (Slovenia) Katarina Srebotnik (semifinals)
4. (Belarus) Max Mirnyi / (Czech Republic) Andrea Hlaváčková (second round)
5. (Austria) Alexander Peya / (Germany) Anna-Lena Grönefeld (third round)
6. (Brazil) Marcelo Melo / (United States) Liezel Huber (third round)
7. (India) Rohan Bopanna / (China) Zheng Jie (quarterfinals)
8. (Canada) Daniel Nestor / (France) Kristina Mladenovic (champions)
9. (Philippines) Treat Huey / (United States) Raquel Kops-Jones (second round)
10. (Pakistan) Aisam-ul-Haq Qureshi / (Zimbabwe) Cara Black (third round)
11. (Poland) Marcin Matkowski / (Czech Republic) Květa Peschke (quarterfinals)
12. (Czech Republic) František Čermák / (Czech Republic) Lucie Hradecká (second round)
13. (United States) Scott Lipsky / (Australia) Casey Dellacqua (third round)
14. (Spain) David Marrero / (Japan) Kimiko Date-Krumm (third round)
15. (India) Leander Paes / (China) Zheng Saisai (second round)
16. (Croatia) Ivan Dodig / (New Zealand) Marina Erakovic (second round)

Click on the seed number of a player to go to their draw section.

== Draw ==
Key

- Q = Qualifier
- WC = Wild card
- LL = Lucky loser
- Alt = Alternate
- ITF = ITF entry
- PR = Protected ranking
- SR = Special ranking
- SE = Special exempt
- JE = Junior exempt
- JR = Junior Accelerator Programme entrant
- CO = College Accelerator Programme entrant
- NG = Next Gen Accelerator Program entrant
- w/o = Walkover
- r = Retired
- d = Defaulted

=== Finals ===
Quarterfinals
1	(Brazil) Bruno Soares (United States) Lisa Raymond	7^{8}	7^{7}
(Australia) John Peers (Australia) Ashleigh Barty	6^{6}	6^{4}
(Netherlands) Jean-Julien Rojer (Russia) Vera Dushevina	6	3	6
7	(India) Rohan Bopanna (China) Zheng Jie	3	6	3
11	(Poland) Marcin Matkowski (Czech Republic) Květa Peschke	6^{10}	7^{8}	4
3	(Serbia) Nenad Zimonjić (Slovenia) Katarina Srebotnik	7^{12}	6^{6}	6
8	(Canada) Daniel Nestor (France) Kristina Mladenovic	7^{7}	7^{7}
2	(Romania) Horia Tecău (India) Sania Mirza	6^{5}	6^{5}

Semifinals
1	(Brazil) Bruno Soares (United States) Lisa Raymond	6	6
(Netherlands) Jean-Julien Rojer (Russia) Vera Dushevina	4	4
3	(Serbia) Nenad Zimonjić (Slovenia) Katarina Srebotnik	2	7^{7}	9
8	(Canada) Daniel Nestor (France) Kristina Mladenovic	6	6^{4}	11

Final
1	(Brazil) Bruno Soares (United States) Lisa Raymond	7	2	6
8	(Canada) Daniel Nestor (France) Kristina Mladenovic	5	6	8

=== Top half ===
==== Section 1 ====
First round
(United Kingdom) C Fleming (United Kingdom) L Robson	7^{7}	2	4
(Slovakia) F Polášek (Slovakia) J Husárová	6^{2}	6	6
WC	(United Kingdom) K Edmund (Canada) E Bouchard	5	4
(Denmark) F Nielsen (Sweden) S Arvidsson	7	6
(Austria) J Knowle (China) S Zhang	7^{9}	3	3
(Australia) J Peers (Australia) A Barty	6^{7}	6	6
(United States) R Ram (Italy) F Schiavone	7^{8}	4	6
(South Africa) R Klaasen (Australia) A Rodionova	6^{6}	6	4

Second round
1	(Brazil) B Soares (United States) L Raymond	6	6
(Slovakia) F Polášek (Slovakia) J Husárová	2	3
(Denmark) F Nielsen (Sweden) S Arvidsson	3	6	6
16	(Croatia) I Dodig (New Zealand) M Erakovic	6	3	4
9	(Philippines) T Huey (United States) R Kops-Jones	6	3	4
(Australia) J Peers (Australia) A Barty	4	6	6
(United States) R Ram (Italy) F Schiavone	0^{r}
6	(Brazil) M Melo (United States) L Huber	4

Third round
1	(Brazil) B Soares (United States) L Raymond	6	6
(Denmark) F Nielsen (Sweden) S Arvidsson	3	4
(Australia) J Peers (Australia) A Barty	6	1	6
6	(Brazil) M Melo (United States) L Huber	4	6	2

Quarterfinals
1	(Brazil) B Soares (United States) L Raymond	7^{8}	7^{7}
(Australia) J Peers (Australia) A Barty	6^{6}	6^{4}

==== Section 2 ====
First round
(Netherlands) J-J Rojer (Russia) V Dushevina	6^{2}	6	6
(United Kingdom) J Murray (Chinese Taipei) S-w Hsieh	7^{7}	3	4
(Netherlands) R Haase (Poland) A Rosolska	3	5
(United Kingdom) J Marray (United Kingdom) H Watson	6	7
Alt	(United States) J Cerretani (Germany) M Barthel	6	3	3
(Sweden) J Brunström (Hungary) K Marosi	3	6	6
(Australia) P Hanley (Chinese Taipei) H-c Chan	2	4
(Colombia) R Farah (Croatia) D Jurak	6	6

Second round
4	(Belarus) M Mirnyi (Czech Republic) A Hlaváčková	6^{3}	3
(Netherlands) J-J Rojer (Russia) V Dushevina	7^{7}	6
(United Kingdom) J Marray (United Kingdom) H Watson	6	3	3
14	(Spain) D Marrero (Japan) K Date-Krumm	2	6	6
12	(Czech Republic) F Čermák (Czech Republic) L Hradecká	6^{3}	3
(Sweden) J Brunström (Hungary) K Marosi	7^{7}	6
(Colombia) R Farah (Croatia) D Jurak	6^{6}	5
7	(India) R Bopanna (China) J Zheng	7^{8}	7

Third round
(Netherlands) J-J Rojer (Russia) V Dushevina	6^{4}	7^{7}	7
14	(Spain) D Marrero (Japan) K Date-Krumm	7^{7}	6^{3}	5
(Sweden) J Brunström (Hungary) K Marosi	6^{4}	6	1
7	(India) R Bopanna (China) J Zheng	7^{7}	3	6

Quarterfinals
(Netherlands) J-J Rojer (Russia) V Dushevina	6	3	6
7	(India) R Bopanna (China) J Zheng	3	6	3

=== Bottom half ===
==== Section 3 ====
First round
(United States) N Monroe (France) M Bartoli	4	6	1
(Mexico) S González (South Africa) N Grandin	6	4	6
(Israel) A Ram (United States) A Spears	6	6^{6}	6
(Italy) D Bracciali (Kazakhstan) G Voskoboeva	4	7^{8}	2
(Italy) F Fognini (Italy) F Pennetta	7^{7}	6
WC	(United Kingdom) J Delgado (United Kingdom) T Moore	6^{2}	3
WC	(United States) J Blake (Croatia) D Vekić	6	6
Alt	(Czech Republic) J Levinský (Latvia) L Dekmeijere	4	1

Second round
5	(Austria) A Peya (Germany) A-L Grönefeld	6	6
(Mexico) S González (South Africa) N Grandin	2	4
(Israel) A Ram (United States) A Spears	5	5
11	(Poland) M Matkowski (Czech Republic) K Peschke	7	7
13	(United States) S Lipsky (Australia) C Dellacqua
(Italy) F Fognini (Italy) F Pennetta	w/o
WC	(United States) J Blake (Croatia) D Vekić	5	1
3	(Serbia) N Zimonjić (Slovenia) K Srebotnik	7	6

Third round
5	(Austria) A Peya (Germany) A-L Grönefeld	7^{7}	4	2
11	(Poland) M Matkowski (Czech Republic) K Peschke	6^{3}	6	6
13	(United States) S Lipsky (Australia) C Dellacqua	2	7^{7}	2
3	(Serbia) N Zimonjić (Slovenia) K Srebotnik	6	6^{3}	6

Quarterfinals
11	(Poland) M Matkowski (Czech Republic) K Peschke	6^{10}	7^{8}	4
3	(Serbia) N Zimonjić (Slovenia) K Srebotnik	7^{12}	6^{6}	6

==== Section 4 ====
First round
WC	(United Kingdom) D Inglot (United Kingdom) J Konta	4	6	19
(Spain) N Almagro (Spain) MT Torró Flor	6	3	17
(India) M Bhupathi (Slovakia) D Hantuchová	7^{7}	4	4
WC	(The Bahamas) M Knowles (Germany) S Lisicki	6^{2}	6	6
(Slovakia) M Mertiňák (Czech Republic) V Uhlířová	4	6	3
(United States) E Butorac (France) A Cornet	6	3	6
(Germany) M Emmrich (Germany) J Görges	7	6
(Colombia) JS Cabal (Serbia) B Jovanovski	5	2

Second round
8	(Canada) D Nestor (France) K Mladenovic	3	6	6
WC	(United Kingdom) D Inglot (United Kingdom) J Konta	6	3	4
WC	(The Bahamas) M Knowles (Germany) S Lisicki	w/o
10	(Pakistan) A-u-H Qureshi (Zimbabwe) C Black
15	(India) L Paes (China) S Zheng	3	3
(United States) E Butorac (France) A Cornet	6	6
(Germany) M Emmrich (Germany) J Görges	3	4
2	(Romania) H Tecău (India) S Mirza	6	6

Third round
8	(Canada) D Nestor (France) K Mladenovic	3	6	6
10	(Pakistan) A-u-H Qureshi (Zimbabwe) C Black	6	3	2
(United States) E Butorac (France) A Cornet	1	5
2	(Romania) H Tecău (India) S Mirza	6	7

Quarterfinals
8	(Canada) D Nestor (France) K Mladenovic	7^{7}	7^{7}
2	(Romania) H Tecău (India) S Mirza	6^{5}	6^{5}
