= 2013 Wimbledon Championships – Boys' doubles =

Boys' doubles
- 2013 Wimbledon Championships

Final
- Champions: (Australia) Thanasi Kokkinakis (Australia) Nick Kyrgios
- Runners-up: (France) Enzo Couacaud (Italy) Stefano Napolitano
- Score: 6–2, 6–3

Events
Singles	men	women		boys	girls
Doubles	men	women	mixed	boys	girls
WC Singles	men	women	quad
WC Doubles	men	women	quad
Legends	men	women	seniors
← 2012 ·	Wimbledon Championships	· 2014 →

Andrew Harris and Nick Kyrgios were the defending champions, but Harris was no longer eligible to compete in junior tennis, and thus could not defend his title.

Kyrgios and Thanasi Kokkinakis defeated Enzo Couacaud and Stefano Napolitano in the final, 6–2, 6–3 to win the boys' doubles tennis title at the 2013 Wimbledon Championships. The pair of Kyrgios and Kokkinakis would go on to win the men's doubles event at the 2022 Australian Open.

== Seeds ==
1. (United Kingdom) Kyle Edmund / (Portugal) Frederico Ferreira Silva (semifinals)
2. (France) Maxime Hamou / (France) Johan Tatlot (second round)
3. (Chile) Christian Garín / (Chile) Nicolás Jarry (withdrew)
4. (Argentina) Pedro Cachin / (Chile) Guillermo Núñez (first round)
5. (Japan) Yoshihito Nishioka / (Peru) Jorge Panta (quarterfinals)
6. (Belgium) Clément Geens / (United States) Noah Rubin (quarterfinals)
7. (Japan) Naoki Nakagawa / (Italy) Gianluigi Quinzi (first round)
8. (Australia) Harry Bourchier / (Germany) Alexander Zverev (withdrew)

== Draw ==
=== Key ===
- Q = Qualifier
- WC = Wild card
- LL = Lucky loser
- Alt = Alternate
- SE = Special exempt
- PR = Protected ranking
- ITF = ITF entry
- JE = Junior exempt
- w/o = Walkover
- r = Retired
- d = Defaulted
- SR = Special ranking

=== Finals ===
Semifinals
1	(United Kingdom) Kyle Edmund (Portugal) Frederico Ferreira Silva	4	6^{7}
(France) Enzo Couacaud (Italy) Stefano Napolitano	6	7^{9}
(Australia) Thanasi Kokkinakis (Australia) Nick Kyrgios	6	3	6
(Italy) Filippo Baldi (Italy) Matteo Donati	4	6	2

Final
(France) Enzo Couacaud (Italy) Stefano Napolitano	2	3
(Australia) Thanasi Kokkinakis (Australia) Nick Kyrgios	6	6

=== Top half ===
First round
1	(United Kingdom) Kyle Edmund (Portugal) Frederico Ferreira Silva	7	4	6
(Sweden) Daniel Windahl (Sweden) Elias Ymer	5	6	3
WC	(United Kingdom) Samm Butler (United Kingdom) Billy Harris	4	4
(Germany) Maximilian Marterer (Austria) Lucas Miedler	6	6
(United States) Luca Corinteli (Mexico) Lucas Gómez	6	4	6
(South Korea) Chung Hyeon (South Korea) Lee Duck-hee	3	6	2
WC	(United Kingdom) Peter Ashley (United Kingdom) Alexander Sendegeya	3	3
6	(Belgium) Clément Geens (United States) Noah Rubin	6	6
3	(Chile) Christian Garín (Chile) Nicolás Jarry	w/o
(France) Benjamin Bonzi (France) Quentin Halys
(United Kingdom) Evan Hoyt (South Africa) Wayne Montgomery	3	6^{4}
(Australia) Jay Andrijic (Australia) Bradley Mousley	6	7^{7}
(United States) Stefan Kozlov (United States) Spencer Papa	7^{7}	4	4
WC	(United Kingdom) Julian Cash (United Kingdom) Joshua Sapwell	6^{4}	6	6
(France) Enzo Couacaud (Italy) Stefano Napolitano	6	6
7	(Japan) Naoki Nakagawa (Italy) Gianluigi Quinzi	4	4

Second round
1	(United Kingdom) K Edmund (Portugal) F Ferreira Silva	6	6
(Germany) M Marterer (Austria) L Miedler	4	3
(United States) L Corinteli (Mexico) L Gómez	4	4
6	(Belgium) C Geens (United States) N Rubin	6	6
(France) B Bonzi (France) Q Halys	3	6^{2}
(Australia) J Andrijic (Australia) B Mousley	6	7^{7}
WC	(United Kingdom) J Cash (United Kingdom) J Sapwell	6^{3}	6^{3}
(France) E Couacaud (Italy) S Napolitano	7^{7}	7^{7}

Quarterfinals
1	(United Kingdom) K Edmund (Portugal) F Ferreira Silva	7^{7}	6
6	(Belgium) C Geens (United States) N Rubin	6^{3}	3
(Australia) J Andrijic (Australia) B Mousley	6	3	4
(France) E Couacaud (Italy) S Napolitano	3	6	6

Semifinals
1	(United Kingdom) K Edmund (Portugal) F Ferreira Silva	4	6^{7}
(France) E Couacaud (Italy) S Napolitano	6	7^{9}

=== Bottom half ===
First round
5	(Japan) Yoshihito Nishioka (Peru) Jorge Panta	6	2	6
(South Korea) Hong Seong-chan (South Korea) Kim Young-seok	4	6	1
(France) Maxime Janvier (Poland) Kamil Majchrzak	6	7
(United Kingdom) Luke Bambridge (United Kingdom) Cameron Norrie	1	5
(Australia) Thanasi Kokkinakis (Australia) Nick Kyrgios	4	6	6
(Brazil) Rafael Matos (Brazil) Marcelo Zormann	6	3	4
(Canada) Hugo Di Feo (Egypt) Mazen Osama	6^{1}	7^{9}	6
4	(Argentina) Pedro Cachin (Chile) Guillermo Núñez	7^{7}	6^{7}	3
Alt	(Germany) Johannes Härteis (Germany) Hannes Wagner	6	7^{7}
(Turkey) Cem İlkel (Slovakia) Matej Maruščák	3	6^{1}
WC	(United Kingdom) Jamie Malik (United Kingdom) Robbie Ridout	6^{7}	2
(Serbia) Laslo Đere (United States) Martin Redlicki	7^{9}	6
(Croatia) Borna Ćorić (United Kingdom) Jonny O'Mara	7^{7}	4	2
(Italy) Filippo Baldi (Italy) Matteo Donati	6^{4}	6	6
(Russia) Karen Khachanov (Russia) Daniil Medvedev	3	6	3
2	(France) Maxime Hamou (France) Johan Tatlot	6	3	6

Second round
5	(Japan) Y Nishioka (Peru) J Panta	7^{7}	7^{7}
(France) M Janvier (Poland) K Majchrzak	6^{2}	6^{3}
(Australia) T Kokkinakis (Australia) N Kyrgios	6	6
(Canada) H Di Feo (Egypt) M Osama	2	3
Alt	(Germany) J Härteis (Germany) H Wagner	6	6
(Serbia) L Đere (United States) M Redlicki	3	3
(Italy) F Baldi (Italy) M Donati	6	6
2	(France) M Hamou (France) J Tatlot	4	2

Quarterfinals
5	(Japan) Y Nishioka (Peru) J Panta	3	2
(Australia) T Kokkinakis (Australia) N Kyrgios	6	6
Alt	(Germany) J Härteis (Germany) H Wagner	3	6^{5}
(Italy) F Baldi (Italy) M Donati	6	7^{7}

Semifinals
(Australia) T Kokkinakis (Australia) N Kyrgios	6	3	6
(Italy) F Baldi (Italy) M Donati	4	6	2
