= 2013 Wimbledon Championships – Gentlemen's invitation doubles =

Gentlemen's invitation doubles
- 2013 Wimbledon Championships

Final
- Champions: (Sweden) Thomas Enqvist (Australia) Mark Philippoussis
- Runners-up: (United Kingdom) Greg Rusedski (France) Fabrice Santoro
- Score: 7–6^{(8–6)}, 6–3

Events
Singles	men	women		boys	girls
Doubles	men	women	mixed	boys	girls
WC Singles	men	women	quad
WC Doubles	men	women	quad
Legends	men	women	seniors
← 2012 ·	Wimbledon Championships	· 2014 →

Thomas Enqvist and Mark Philippoussis defeated the defending champions Greg Rusedski and Fabrice Santoro in the final, 6–7^{(6–8)}, 3–6 to win the gentlemen's invitation doubles tennis title at the 2013 Wimbledon Championships.

== Draw ==
=== Key ===
- Q = Qualifier
- WC = Wild card
- LL = Lucky loser
- Alt = Alternate
- ITF = ITF entry
- PR = Protected ranking
- SR = Special ranking
- SE = Special exempt
- JE = Junior exempt
- JR = Junior Accelerator Programme entrant
- CO = College Accelerator Programme entrant
- NG = Next Gen Accelerator Program entrant
- w/o = Walkover
- r = Retired
- d = Defaulted

=== Final ===
Final
(United Kingdom) Greg Rusedski (France) Fabrice Santoro	6^{6}	3
(Sweden) Thomas Enqvist (Australia) Mark Philippoussis	7^{8}	6

=== Group A ===
	(Sweden) Björkman (Australia) Woodbridge	(United States) Gimelstob (United States) Martin	(Netherlands) Krajicek (United Kingdom) Petchey	(United Kingdom) Rusedski (France) Santoro	RR; W–L	Set; W–L	Game; W–L	Standings
(Sweden) Jonas Björkman (Australia) Todd Woodbridge		6–3, 2–6, [10–12]	7–6^{(7–1)}, 6–2	3–6, 6–7^{(4–7)}	1–2	3–4	30–31	3
(United States) Justin Gimelstob (United States) Todd Martin	3–6, 6–2, [12–10]		6–1, 6–4	1–6, 6–4, [10–12]	2–1	5–3	29–24	2
(Netherlands) Richard Krajicek (United Kingdom) Mark Petchey	6–7^{(1–7)}, 2–6	1–6, 4–6		w/o	0–3	0–4	13–25	4
(United Kingdom) Greg Rusedski (France) Fabrice Santoro	6–3, 7–6^{(7–4)}	6–1, 4–6, [12–10]	w/o		3–0	4–1	24–16	1

Standings are determined by: 1. number of wins; 2. number of matches; 3. in two-players-ties, head-to-head records; 4. in three-players-ties, percentage of sets won, or of games won; 5. steering-committee decision.

=== Group B ===
	(Netherlands) Eltingh (Netherlands) Haarhuis	(Sweden) Enqvist (Australia) Philippoussis	(South Africa) Ferreira (United Kingdom) Wilkinson	(United Kingdom) Cowan (France) Pioline	RR; W–L	Set; W–L	Game; W–L	Standings
(Netherlands) Jacco Eltingh (Netherlands) Paul Haarhuis		4–6, 4–6	6–3, 7–6^{(7–3)}	7–6^{(7–2)}, 6–2	2–1	4–2	34–29	2
(Sweden) Thomas Enqvist (Australia) Mark Philippoussis	6–4, 6–4		6–4, 6–4	6–4, 6–4	3–0	6–0	36–24	1
(South Africa) Wayne Ferreira (United Kingdom) Chris Wilkinson	3–6, 6–7^{(3–7)}	4–6, 4–6		4–6, 2–6	0–3	0–6	17–25	4
(United Kingdom) Barry Cowan (France) Cédric Pioline	6–7^{(2–7)}, 2–6	4–6, 4–6	6–4, 6–2		1–2	2–4	16–25	3

Standings are determined by: 1. number of wins; 2. number of matches; 3. in two-players-ties, head-to-head records; 4. in three-players-ties, percentage of sets won, or of games won; 5. steering-committee decision.
