= 2013 Wimbledon Championships – Girls' doubles =

Girls' doubles
- 2013 Wimbledon Championships

Final
- Champions: (Czech Republic) Barbora Krejčíková (Czech Republic) Kateřina Siniaková
- Runners-up: (Ukraine) Anhelina Kalinina (Belarus) Iryna Shymanovich
- Score: 6–3, 6–1

Events
Singles	men	women		boys	girls
Doubles	men	women	mixed	boys	girls
WC Singles	men	women	quad
WC Doubles	men	women	quad
Legends	men	women	seniors
← 2012 ·	Wimbledon Championships	· 2014 →

Barbora Krejčíková and Kateřina Siniaková defeated Anhelina Kalinina and Iryna Shymanovich in the final, 6–3, 6–1 to win the girls' doubles tennis title at the 2013 Wimbledon Championships. They would also win the senior title five years later.

Eugenie Bouchard and Taylor Townsend were the reigning champions, but Bouchard was no longer eligible to compete in junior tennis. Townsend chose not to defend her title, deciding instead to only compete in singles.

== Seeds ==
1. (Czech Republic) Barbora Krejčíková / (Czech Republic) Kateřina Siniaková (champions)
2. (Switzerland) Belinda Bencic / (Slovakia) Petra Uberalová (semifinals)
3. (Belgium) Elise Mertens / (Turkey) İpek Soylu (quarterfinals)
4. (Ecuador) Doménica González / (Canada) Carol Zhao (quarterfinals)
5. (Romania) Ioana Ducu / (Serbia) Nina Stojanović (semifinals)
6. (United States) Louisa Chirico / (Mexico) Alejandra Cisneros (first round)
7. (United Kingdom) Katy Dunne / (Russia) Anastasiya Komardina (first round)
8. (Ukraine) Anhelina Kalinina / (Belarus) Iryna Shymanovich (final)

== Draw ==
=== Key ===
- Q = Qualifier
- WC = Wild card
- LL = Lucky loser
- Alt = Alternate
- SE = Special exempt
- PR = Protected ranking
- ITF = ITF entry
- JE = Junior exempt
- w/o = Walkover
- r = Retired
- d = Defaulted
- SR = Special ranking

=== Finals ===
Semifinals
1	(Czech Republic) Barbora Krejčíková (Czech Republic) Kateřina Siniaková	6	6
5	(Romania) Ioana Ducu (Serbia) Nina Stojanović	3	2
8	(Ukraine) Anhelina Kalinina (Belarus) Iryna Shymanovich	6	3	6
2	(Switzerland) Belinda Bencic (Slovakia) Petra Uberalová	2	6	0

Final
1	(Czech Republic) Barbora Krejčíková (Czech Republic) Kateřina Siniaková	6	6
8	(Ukraine) Anhelina Kalinina (Belarus) Iryna Shymanovich	3	1

=== Top half ===
First round
1	(Czech Republic) Barbora Krejčíková (Czech Republic) Kateřina Siniaková	6	6
(United Kingdom) Katie Boulter (United Kingdom) Isabelle Wallace	0	0
(Italy) Giulia Pairone (Russia) Alina Silich	1	7	6
(Italy) Alice Matteucci (Czech Republic) Gabriela Pantůčková	6	5	3
(Brazil) Carolina Meligeni Alves (Australia) Sara Tomic	6	6
(France) Fiona Ferro (Italy) Beatrice Lombardo	2	1
WC	(United Kingdom) Anna Brogan (United Kingdom) Maia Lumsden	6	3	6
7	(United Kingdom) Katy Dunne (Russia) Anastasiya Komardina	2	6	3
4	(Ecuador) Doménica González (Canada) Carol Zhao	6	3	6
(Croatia) Adrijana Lekaj (Mexico) Victoria Rodríguez	4	6	1
(Lithuania) Justina Mikulskytė (Lithuania) Akvilė Paražinskaitė	4	4
WC	(United Kingdom) Harriet Dart (United Kingdom) Lana Rush	6	6
(Japan) Kyōka Okamura (United States) Johnnise Renaud	5	2
(Ukraine) Viktoriya Lushkova (Romania) Ioana Loredana Roșca	7	6
(Colombia) Laura Ucrós (Argentina) Constanza Vega	2	4
5	(Romania) Ioana Ducu (Serbia) Nina Stojanović	6	6

Second round
1	(Czech Republic) B Krejčíková (Czech Republic) K Siniaková	6	6
(Italy) G Pairone (Russia) A Silich	1	3
(Brazil) C Meligeni Alves (Australia) S Tomic	6	6^{3}	6
WC	(United Kingdom) A Brogan (United Kingdom) M Lumsden	4	7^{7}	0
4	(Ecuador) D González (Canada) C Zhao	7^{7}	6^{2}	6
WC	(United Kingdom) H Dart (United Kingdom) L Rush	6^{2}	7^{7}	1
(Ukraine) V Lushkova (Romania) IL Roșca	6	3	5
5	(Romania) I Ducu (Serbia) N Stojanović	3	6	7

Quarterfinals
1	(Czech Republic) B Krejčíková (Czech Republic) K Siniaková	6	6
(Brazil) C Meligeni Alves (Australia) S Tomic	4	0
4	(Ecuador) D González (Canada) C Zhao	4	6	3
5	(Romania) I Ducu (Serbia) N Stojanović	6	3	6

Semifinals
1	(Czech Republic) B Krejčíková (Czech Republic) K Siniaková	6	6
5	(Romania) I Ducu (Serbia) N Stojanović	3	2

=== Bottom half ===
First round
8	(Ukraine) Anhelina Kalinina (Belarus) Iryna Shymanovich	6	6
WC	(United Kingdom) Jasmine Amber Asghar (United Kingdom) Pippa Horn	2	3
(Slovakia) Kristína Schmiedlová (Hungary) Szabina Szlavikovics	6	7
(Canada) Marika Akkerman (Paraguay) Camila Giangreco Campiz	4	5
(Czech Republic) Marie Bouzková (Ukraine) Helen Ploskina	1	0
(United States) Jamie Loeb (Japan) Ayaka Okuno	6	6
(Japan) Mami Adachi (Japan) Hikari Yamamoto	5	5
3	(Belgium) Elise Mertens (Turkey) İpek Soylu	7	7
6	(United States) Louisa Chirico (Mexico) Alejandra Cisneros	2	6	2
(Estonia) Anett Kontaveit (Latvia) Jeļena Ostapenko	6	3	6
(Italy) Deborah Chiesa (Croatia) Jana Fett	w/o
(Thailand) Kamonwan Buayam (Chinese Taipei) Hsu Ching-wen
(Hong Kong) Katherine Ip (United States) Dasha Ivanova	5	6	1
(Egypt) Sandra Samir (China) Xu Shilin	7	4	6
WC	(United Kingdom) Freya Christie (United Kingdom) Gabriella Taylor	1	5
2	(Switzerland) Belinda Bencic (Slovakia) Petra Uberalová	6	7

Second round
8	(Ukraine) A Kalinina (Belarus) I Shymanovich	6	6
(Slovakia) K Schmiedlová (Hungary) Sz Szlavikovics	3	4
(United States) J Loeb (Japan) A Okuno	2	1
3	(Belgium) E Mertens (Turkey) I Soylu	6	6
(Estonia) A Kontaveit (Latvia) J Ostapenko	6	6
(Thailand) K Buayam (Chinese Taipei) C-w Hsu	2	3
(Egypt) S Samir (China) S Xu	1	0
2	(Switzerland) B Bencic (Slovakia) P Uberalová	6	6

Quarterfinals
8	(Ukraine) A Kalinina (Belarus) I Shymanovich	1	6	6
3	(Belgium) E Mertens (Turkey) I Soylu	6	4	4
(Estonia) A Kontaveit (Latvia) J Ostapenko	1	1
2	(Switzerland) B Bencic (Slovakia) P Uberalová	6	6

Semifinals
8	(Ukraine) A Kalinina (Belarus) I Shymanovich	6	3	6
2	(Switzerland) B Bencic (Slovakia) P Uberalová	2	6	0
