= 2013 Wimbledon Championships – Ladies' invitation doubles =

Ladies' invitation doubles
- 2013 Wimbledon Championships

Final
- Champions: (United States) Lindsay Davenport (Switzerland) Martina Hingis
- Runners-up: (Czech Republic) Jana Novotná (Austria) Barbara Schett
- Score: 6–2, 6–2

Events
Singles	men	women		boys	girls
Doubles	men	women	mixed	boys	girls
WC Singles	men	women	quad
WC Doubles	men	women	quad
Legends	men	women	seniors
← 2012 ·	Wimbledon Championships	· 2014 →

Lindsay Davenport and Martina Hingis successfully defended their title, defeating Jana Novotná and Barbara Schett in the final, 6–2, 6–2 to win the ladies' invitation doubles tennis title at the 2013 Wimbledon Championships.

== Draw ==
=== Key ===
- Q = Qualifier
- WC = Wild card
- LL = Lucky loser
- Alt = Alternate
- ITF = ITF entry
- PR = Protected ranking
- SR = Special ranking
- SE = Special exempt
- JE = Junior exempt
- JR = Junior Accelerator Programme entrant
- CO = College Accelerator Programme entrant
- NG = Next Gen Accelerator Program entrant
- w/o = Walkover
- r = Retired
- d = Defaulted

=== Final ===
Final
(United States) Lindsay Davenport (Switzerland) Martina Hingis	6	6
(Czech Republic) Jana Novotná (Austria) Barbara Schett	2	2

=== Group A ===
	(United States) Austin (Czech Republic) Suková	(United States) Davenport (Switzerland) Hingis	(Spain) Martínez (France) Tauziat	(Australia) Stubbs (Hungary) Temesvári	RR; W–L	Set; W–L	Game; W–L	Standings
(United States) Tracy Austin (Czech Republic) Helena Suková		2–6, 5–7	6–1, 6–1	6–4, 6–2	2–1	4–2	31–21	2
(United States) Lindsay Davenport (Switzerland) Martina Hingis	6–2, 7–5		6–3, 6–1	7–5, 6–2	3–0	6–0	38–18	1
(Spain) Conchita Martínez (France) Nathalie Tauziat	1–6, 1–6	3–6, 1–6		4–6, 3–6	0–3	0–6	13–36	4
(Australia) Rennae Stubbs (Hungary) Andrea Temesvári	4–6, 2–6	5–7, 2–6	6–4, 6–3		1–2	2–4	25–32	3

Standings are determined by: 1. number of wins; 2. number of matches; 3. in two-players-ties, head-to-head records; 4. in three-players-ties, percentage of sets won, or of games won; 5. steering-committee decision.

=== Group B ===
	(United Kingdom) Ahl (Bulgaria) Maleeva	(Croatia) Majoli (Belarus) Zvereva	(United States) Navratilova (United States) Shriver	(Czech Republic) Novotná (Austria) Schett	RR; W–L	Set; W–L	Game; W–L	Standings
(United Kingdom) Lucie Ahl (Bulgaria) Magdalena Maleeva		6–0, 5–7, [10–8]	6–2, 7–6^{(8–6)}	2–6, 7–6^{(7–2)}, [2–10]	2–1	5–3	34–28	2
(Croatia) Iva Majoli (Belarus) Natasha Zvereva	0–6, 7–5, [8–10]		6–2, 6–3	3–6, 3–6	1–2	3–4	25–29	3
(United States) Martina Navratilova (United States) Pam Shriver	2–6, 6–7^{(6–8)}	2–6, 3–6		1–6, 4–6	0–3	0–6	18–37	4
(Czech Republic) Jana Novotná (Austria) Barbara Schett	6–2, 6–7^{(2–7)}, [10–2]	6–3, 6–3	6–1, 6–4		3–0	6–1	37–20	1

Standings are determined by: 1. number of wins; 2. number of matches; 3. in two-players-ties, head-to-head records; 4. in three-players-ties, percentage of sets won, or of games won; 5. steering-committee decision.
