= 2013 Wimbledon Championships – Boys' singles =

Boys' singles
- 2013 Wimbledon Championships

Final
- Champion: (Italy) Gianluigi Quinzi
- Runner-up: (South Korea) Chung Hyeon
- Score: 7–5, 7–6^{(7–2)}

Details
- Draw: 64 (8 Q / 8 WC )
- Seeds: 16

Events
Singles	men	women		boys	girls
Doubles	men	women	mixed	boys	girls
WC Singles	men	women	quad
WC Doubles	men	women	quad
Legends	men	women	seniors
← 2012 ·	Wimbledon Championships	· 2014 →

Gianluigi Quinzi defeated Chung Hyeon in the final, 7–5, 7–6^{(7–2)} to win the boys' singles tennis title at the 2013 Wimbledon Championships. Quinzi won the title without dropping a set in the entire tournament. He became the second Italian to win the boys' singles title after Diego Nargiso won the title in 1987.

Filip Peliwo was the defending champion, but was no longer eligible to compete in junior events.

== Seeds ==
1. (Australia) Nick Kyrgios (third round)
2. (Serbia) Nikola Milojević (quarterfinals)
3. (Germany) Alexander Zverev (third round, retired)
4. (Serbia) Laslo Đere (quarterfinals)
5. (United Kingdom) Kyle Edmund (semifinals)
6. (Italy) Gianluigi Quinzi (champion)
7. (Chile) Cristian Garín (third round, retired)
8. (Croatia) Borna Ćorić (quarterfinals)

9. (Italy) Filippo Baldi (third round)
10. (France) Johan Tatlot (third round)
11. (Argentina) Pedro Cachin (second round)
12. (France) Maxime Hamou (first round)
13. (Belgium) Clément Geens (first round)
14. (Chile) Guillermo Núñez (first round)
15. (Portugal) Frederico Ferreira Silva (first round)
16. (South Africa) Wayne Montgomery (first round)

Click on the seed number of a player to go to their draw section.

== Draw ==
=== Key ===
- Q = Qualifier
- WC = Wild card
- LL = Lucky loser
- Alt = Alternate
- ITF = ITF entry
- PR = Protected ranking
- SR = Special ranking
- SE = Special exempt
- JE = Junior exempt
- JR = Junior Accelerator Programme entrant
- CO = College Accelerator Programme entrant
- NG = Next Gen Accelerator Program entrant
- w/o = Walkover
- r = Retired
- d = Defaulted

=== Finals ===
Quarterfinals
(South Korea) Chung Hyeon	7^{7}	6
8	(Croatia) Borna Ćorić	6^{5}	3
4	(Serbia) Laslo Đere	3	4
(Germany) Maximilian Marterer	6	6
5	(United Kingdom) Kyle Edmund	4	6	6
(United States) Stefan Kozlov	6	1	3
6	(Italy) Gianluigi Quinzi	6	6
2	(Serbia) Nikola Milojević	4	3

Semifinals
(South Korea) Chung Hyeon	6^{5}	6	6
(Germany) Maximilian Marterer	7^{7}	1	3
5	(United Kingdom) Kyle Edmund	4	4
6	(Italy) Gianluigi Quinzi	6	6

Final
(South Korea) Chung Hyeon	5	6^{2}
6	(Italy) Gianluigi Quinzi	7	7^{7}

=== Top half ===
==== Section 1 ====
First round
1	(Australia) Nick Kyrgios	6	6
WC	(United Kingdom) Evan Hoyt	4	3
(Austria) Lucas Miedler	6	4	9
(France) Benjamin Bonzi	4	6	7
(United States) Spencer Papa	3	2
(South Korea) Chung Hyeon	6	6
(Canada) Hugo Di Feo	6	5	9
13	(Belgium) Clément Geens	3	7	7
9	(Italy) Filippo Baldi	6	7^{8}
(Slovakia) Matej Maruščák	3	6^{6}
WC	(United Kingdom) Billy Harris	6^{5}	6	6
Q	(Chile) Jaime Ignacio Galleguillos	7^{7}	3	4
(France) Quentin Halys	7	6
(Peru) Jorge Panta	5	2
(Japan) Naoki Nakagawa	5	4
8	(Croatia) Borna Ćorić	7	6

Second round
1	(Australia) N Kyrgios	6	6
(Austria) L Miedler	2	4
(South Korea) H Chung	6	6
(Canada) H di Feo	3	3
9	(Italy) F Baldi	6	7^{7}
WC	(United Kingdom) B Harris	1	6^{4}
(France) Q Halys	4	6^{3}
8	(Croatia) B Ćorić	6	7^{7}

Third round
1	(Australia) N Kyrgios	2	2
(South Korea) H Chung	6	6
9	(Italy) F Baldi	4	5
8	(Croatia) B Ćorić	6	7

Quarterfinals
(South Korea) H Chung	7^{7}	6
8	(Croatia) B Ćorić	6^{5}	3

==== Section 2 ====
First round
4	(Serbia) Laslo Đere	6	2	6
(United Kingdom) Cameron Norrie	3	6	3
(Russia) Karen Khachanov	6	6
(Brazil) Marcelo Zormann	3	2
Q	(Sweden) Daniel Windahl	6	4	6
WC	(United Kingdom) Peter Ashley	4	6	4
WC	(Australia) Thanasi Kokkinakis	6	6
16	(South Africa) Wayne Montgomery	3	3
12	(France) Maxime Hamou	3	3
(Italy) Stefano Napolitano	6	6
(Germany) Maximilian Marterer	6	6
(Poland) Kamil Majchrzak	2	4
(United Kingdom) Luke Bambridge	3	6	9
(United States) Noah Rubin	6	4	7
(South Korea) Lee Duck-hee	6	4	2
7	(Chile) Cristian Garín	2	6	6

Second round
4	(Serbia) L Đere	6^{3}	6	6
(Russia) K Khachanov	7^{7}	3	3
Q	(Sweden) D Windahl	6^{6}	5
WC	(Australia) T Kokkinakis	7^{8}	7
(Italy) S Napolitano	6	6^{2}	10
(Germany) M Marterer	4	7^{7}	12
(United Kingdom) L Bambridge	4	4
7	(Chile) C Garín	6	6

Third round
4	(Serbia) L Đere	3	6	6
WC	(Australia) T Kokkinakis	6	2	0
(Germany) M Marterer	6	3
7	(Chile) C Garín	3	2^{r}

Quarterfinals
4	(Serbia) L Đere	3	4
(Germany) M Marterer	6	6

=== Bottom half ===
==== Section 3 ====
First round
5	(United Kingdom) Kyle Edmund	6	6
(South Korea) Kim Young-seok	4	3
Q	(Australia) Jay Andrijic	4	4
(Japan) Yoshihito Nishioka	6	6
Q	(United Kingdom) Jonny O'Mara	7^{7}	5	9
(France) Maxime Janvier	6^{3}	7	7
(Egypt) Mazen Osama	5	6^{3}
11	(Argentina) Pedro Cachin	7	7^{7}
14	(Chile) Guillermo Núñez	4	5
(Mexico) Lucas Gómez	6	7
(United States) Stefan Kozlov	6	6
WC	(United Kingdom) Joshua Sapwell	3	3
(Australia) Harry Bourchier	4	2
Q	(United Kingdom) Julian Cash	6	6
(Sweden) Elias Ymer	6^{1}	6^{2}
3	(Germany) Alexander Zverev	7^{7}	7^{7}

Second round
5	(United Kingdom) K Edmund	6	6
(Japan) Y Nishioka	3	1
Q	(United Kingdom) J O'Mara	7^{7}	6
11	(Argentina) P Cachin	6^{3}	2
(Mexico) L Gómez	2	3
(United States) S Kozlov	6	6
Q	(United Kingdom) J Cash	4	6^{7}
3	(Germany) A Zverev	6	7^{9}

Third round
5	(United Kingdom) K Edmund	6	6
Q	(United Kingdom) J O'Mara	3	2
(United States) S Kozlov	1	6	4
3	(Germany) A Zverev	6	4	0^{r}

Quarterfinals
5	(United Kingdom) K Edmund	4	6	6
(United States) S Kozlov	6	1	3

==== Section 4 ====
First round
6	(Italy) Gianluigi Quinzi	6	6
WC	(United Kingdom) Samm Butler	1	1
Q	(Germany) Johannes Härteis	6	6^{5}	10
(Chile) Nicolás Jarry	3	7^{7}	8
Q	(Thailand) Wishaya Trongcharoenchaikul	7^{7}	5	6
WC	(United Kingdom) Thomas Colautti	6^{1}	7	3
(United States) Luca Corinteli	3	2
10	(France) Johan Tatlot	6	6
15	(Portugal) Frederico Ferreira Silva	1	3
(France) Enzo Couacaud	6	6
(Australia) Bradley Mousley	6	6
WC	(United Kingdom) Alexander Sendegeya	2	4
(Russia) Daniil Medvedev	7^{7}	6
(South Korea) Hong Seong-chan	6^{3}	2
Q	(United Kingdom) Jamie Malik	4	2
2	(Serbia) Nikola Milojević	6	6

Second round
6	(Italy) G Quinzi	6	7
Q	(Germany) J Härteis	3	5
Q	(Thailand) W Trongcharoenchaikul	5	1
10	(France) J Tatlot	7	6
(France) E Couacaud	6	6
(Australia) B Mousley	2	2
(Russia) D Medvedev	2	4
2	(Serbia) N Milojević	6	6

Third round
6	(Italy) G Quinzi	6	6
10	(France) J Tatlot	1	1
(France) E Couacaud	5	4
2	(Serbia) N Milojević	7	6

Quarterfinals
6	(Italy) G Quinzi	6	6
2	(Serbia) N Milojević	4	3
