= 2013 Wimbledon Championships – Girls' singles =

Girls' singles
- 2013 Wimbledon Championships

Final
- Champion: (Switzerland) Belinda Bencic
- Runner-up: (United States) Taylor Townsend
- Score: 4–6, 6–1, 6–4

Details
- Draw: 64 (8 Q / 8 WC )
- Seeds: 16

Events
Singles	men	women		boys	girls
Doubles	men	women	mixed	boys	girls
WC Singles	men	women	quad
WC Doubles	men	women	quad
Legends	men	women	seniors
← 2012 ·	Wimbledon Championships	· 2014 →

Belinda Bencic defeated Taylor Townsend in the final, 4–6, 6–1, 6–4 to win the girls' singles title at the 2013 Wimbledon Championships.

Eugenie Bouchard was the defending champion, but chose to compete in the ladies' singles competition, where she lost to Carla Suárez Navarro in the third round.

== Seeds ==
1. (Switzerland) Belinda Bencic (champion)
2. (Croatia) Ana Konjuh (semifinals)
3. (Czech Republic) Kateřina Siniaková (third round)
4. (Czech Republic) Barbora Krejčíková (quarterfinals)
5. (United States) Taylor Townsend (final)
6. (Belgium) Elise Mertens (quarterfinals)
7. (United Kingdom) Katy Dunne (first round)
8. (Chinese Taipei) Hsu Ching-wen (second round)
9. (Canada) Carol Zhao (third round)
10. (Paraguay) Camila Giangreco Campiz (second round)
11. (Switzerland) Karin Kennel (third round)
12. (Ukraine) Anhelina Kalinina (quarterfinals)
13. (Estonia) Anett Kontaveit (third round)
14. (Serbia) Nina Stojanović (first round)
15. (United States) Louisa Chirico (semifinals)
16. (Turkey) İpek Soylu (third round)

Click on the seed number of a player to go to their draw section.

== Draw ==
=== Key ===
- Q = Qualifier
- WC = Wild card
- LL = Lucky loser
- Alt = Alternate
- SE = Special exempt
- PR = Protected ranking
- ITF = ITF entry
- JE = Junior exempt
- w/o = Walkover
- r = Retired
- d = Defaulted
- SR = Special ranking

=== Finals ===
Quarterfinals
1/WC	(Switzerland) Belinda Bencic	6	6
(United States) Jamie Loeb	2	3
15	(United States) Louisa Chirico	6	3	6
6	(Belgium) Elise Mertens	3	6	2
5	(United States) Taylor Townsend	6	7^{7}
4	(Czech Republic) Barbora Krejčíková	2	6^{4}
12	(Ukraine) Anhelina Kalinina	3	2
2	(Croatia) Ana Konjuh	6	6

Semifinals
1/WC	(Switzerland) Belinda Bencic	6	6
15	(United States) Louisa Chirico	0	3
5	(United States) Taylor Townsend	2	7^{7}	7
2	(Croatia) Ana Konjuh	6	6^{4}	5

Final
1/WC	(Switzerland) Belinda Bencic	4	6	6
5	(United States) Taylor Townsend	6	1	4

=== Top half ===
==== Section 1 ====
First round
1/WC	(Switzerland) Belinda Bencic	6	6
WC	(United Kingdom) Freya Christie	1	1
Q	(Belgium) Greetje Minnen	6	2	6
Q	(Japan) Mami Adachi	2	6	2
(Ecuador) Doménica González	3	1
(France) Fiona Ferro	6	6
(Australia) Sara Tomic	1	0
13	(Estonia) Anett Kontaveit	6	6
10	(Paraguay) Camila Giangreco Campiz	6	6
(Colombia) Laura Ucrós	1	4
(Ukraine) Viktoriya Lushkova	6^{3}	6	3
(United States) Jamie Loeb	7^{7}	4	6
(Czech Republic) Marie Bouzková	6^{5}	6	6
(Italy) Alice Matteucci	7^{7}	3	8
(Romania) Ioana Ducu	6	6
7	(United Kingdom) Katy Dunne	2	2

Second round
1/WC	(Switzerland) B Bencic	6	6
Q	(Belgium) G Minnen	0	4
(France) F Ferro	1	1
13	(Estonia) A Kontaveit	6	6
10	(Paraguay) C Giangreco Campiz	6^{1}	2
(United States) J Loeb	7^{7}	6
(Italy) A Matteucci	6	6^{5}	7
(Romania) I Ducu	3	7^{7}	5

Third round
1/WC	(Switzerland) B Bencic	6	4	6
13	(Estonia) A Kontaveit	4	6	2
(United States) J Loeb	6^{5}	6	6
(Italy) A Matteucci	7^{7}	2	3

Quarterfinals
1/WC	(Switzerland) B Bencic	6	6
(United States) J Loeb	2	3

==== Section 2 ====
First round
3	(Czech Republic) Kateřina Siniaková	6	6
(Russia) Alina Silich	3	2
Q	(Croatia) Jana Fett	6	7
(Mexico) Victoria Rodríguez	2	5
WC	(United Kingdom) Maia Lumsden	6	3	1^{r}
(Slovakia) Petra Uberalová	4	6	4
(Ukraine) Helen Ploskina	3	6	2
15	(United States) Louisa Chirico	6	1	6
9	(Canada) Carol Zhao	6	6
(Japan) Ayaka Okuno	0	3
(China) Xu Shilin	6	7
Q	(United Kingdom) Pippa Horn	0	5
(Croatia) Adrijana Lekaj	3	3
(United Kingdom) Katie Boulter	6	6
(Brazil) Carolina Meligeni Alves	2	1
6	(Belgium) Elise Mertens	6	6

Second round
3	(Czech Republic) K Siniaková	6	6
Q	(Croatia) J Fett	3	1
(Slovakia) P Uberalová	6	2	4
15	(United States) L Chirico	4	6	6
9	(Canada) C Zhao	6	6
(China) S Xu	2	4
(United Kingdom) K Boulter	3	6	1
6	(Belgium) E Mertens	6	3	6

Third round
3	(Czech Republic) K Siniaková	6	5	4
15	(United States) L Chirico	4	7	6
9	(Canada) C Zhao	3	5
6	(Belgium) E Mertens	6	7

Quarterfinals
15	(United States) L Chirico	6	3	6
6	(Belgium) E Mertens	3	6	2

=== Bottom half ===
==== Section 3 ====
First round
5	(United States) Taylor Townsend	6^{3}	6	7
(Belarus) Iryna Shymanovich	7^{7}	4	5
(Egypt) Sandra Samir	4	6	7
Q	(Italy) Deborah Chiesa	6	1	5
(Argentina) Constanza Vega	5	6	4
WC	(United Kingdom) Lana Rush	7	4	6
(Slovakia) Kristína Schmiedlová	6	3	6
11/WC	(Switzerland) Karin Kennel	2	6	8
16	(Turkey) İpek Soylu	6	6
Q	(Australia) Lizette Cabrera	3	4
(Mexico) Alejandra Cisneros	3	0
(Hong Kong) Katherine Ip	6	6
Q	(United States) Dasha Ivanova	2	6^{3}
Q	(Japan) Kyōka Okamura	6	7^{7}
WC	(United Kingdom) Gabriella Taylor	1	1
4	(Czech Republic) Barbora Krejčíková	6	6

Second round
5	(United States) T Townsend	6	6
(Egypt) S Samir	2	4
WC	(United Kingdom) L Rush	6^{2}	5
11/WC	(Switzerland) K Kennel	7^{7}	7
16	(Turkey) İ Soylu	6	6
(Hong Kong) K Ip	2	4
Q	(Japan) K Okamura	3	2
4	(Czech Republic) B Krejčíková	6	6

Third round
5	(United States) T Townsend	6	7
11/WC	(Switzerland) K Kennel	3	5
16	(Turkey) İ Soylu	6	3	3
4	(Czech Republic) B Krejčíková	1	6	6

Quarterfinals
5	(United States) T Townsend	6	7^{7}
4	(Czech Republic) B Krejčíková	2	6^{4}

==== Section 4 ====
First round
8	(Chinese Taipei) Hsu Ching-wen	6	6
WC	(United Kingdom) Anna Brogan	3	4
(Russia) Anastasiya Komardina	6	6
(United States) Johnnise Renaud	4	2
WC	(United Kingdom) Isabelle Wallace	7^{7}	2	1
(Romania) Ioana Loredana Roșca	6^{3}	6	6
(Thailand) Kamonwan Buayam	0	1
12	(Ukraine) Anhelina Kalinina	6	6
14	(Serbia) Nina Stojanović	2	4
(Brazil) Beatriz Haddad Maia	6	6
(Japan) Hikari Yamamoto	3	2
(Czech Republic) Gabriela Pantůčková	6	6
SE	(United Kingdom) Harriet Dart	6	7^{11}
(Latvia) Jeļena Ostapenko	4	6^{9}
(Lithuania) Akvilė Paražinskaitė	2	3
2	(Croatia) Ana Konjuh	6	6

Second round
8	(Chinese Taipei) C-w Hsu	5	4
(Russia) A Komardina	7	6
(Romania) IL Roșca	3	4
12	(Ukraine) A Kalinina	6	6
(Brazil) B Haddad Maia	6	6
(Czech Republic) G Pantůčková	2	4
SE	(United Kingdom) H Dart	1	6^{4}
2	(Croatia) A Konjuh	6	7^{7}

Third round
(Russia) A Komardina	6	4	1
12	(Ukraine) A Kalinina	3	6	6
(Brazil) B Haddad Maia	2	3
2	(Croatia) A Konjuh	6	6

Quarterfinals
12	(Ukraine) A Kalinina	3	2
2	(Croatia) A Konjuh	6	6
