= 2013 Wimbledon Championships – Men's doubles =

Men's doubles
- 2013 Wimbledon Championships

Final
- Champions: (United States) Bob Bryan (United States) Mike Bryan
- Runners-up: (Croatia) Ivan Dodig (Brazil) Marcelo Melo
- Score: 3–6, 6–3, 6–4, 6–4

Details
- Draw: 64 (4 Q / 3 WC )
- Seeds: 16

Events
Singles	men	women		boys	girls
Doubles	men	women	mixed	boys	girls
WC Singles	men	women	quad
WC Doubles	men	women	quad
Legends	men	women	seniors
← 2012 ·	Wimbledon Championships	· 2014 →

Bob and Mike Bryan defeated Ivan Dodig and Marcelo Melo in the final, 3–6, 6–3, 6–4, 6–4 to win the gentlemen's doubles title at the 2013 Wimbledon Championships. With the victory, the Bryan brothers completed the "Bryan Slam", a non-calendar year Golden Slam, becoming the first doubles team in tennis history to hold all four majors as well as Olympic gold at the same time. The Bryans are also the first men's doubles team in the Open Era to hold all four major titles at once.

Jonathan Marray and Frederik Nielsen were the defending champions, but decided not to play together. Marray played alongside Colin Fleming but lost to Robert Lindstedt and Daniel Nestor in the third round. Nielsen paired with Grigor Dimitrov but lost to Julien Benneteau and Nenad Zimonjić in the second round.

== Seeds ==
1. (United States) Bob Bryan / (United States) Mike Bryan (champions)
2. (Spain) Marcel Granollers / (Spain) Marc López (first round)
3. (Austria) Alexander Peya / (Brazil) Bruno Soares (third round)
4. (India) Leander Paes / (Czech Republic) Radek Štěpánek (semifinals)
5. (Pakistan) Aisam-ul-Haq Qureshi / (Netherlands) Jean-Julien Rojer (third round)
6. (Sweden) Robert Lindstedt / (Canada) Daniel Nestor (quarterfinals)
7. (Belarus) Max Mirnyi / (Romania) Horia Tecău (third round)
8. (India) Mahesh Bhupathi / (Austria) Julian Knowle (quarterfinals)
9. (United Kingdom) Colin Fleming / (United Kingdom) Jonathan Marray (third round)
10. (Mexico) Santiago González / (United States) Scott Lipsky (second round)
11. (France) Julien Benneteau / (Serbia) Nenad Zimonjić (quarterfinals)
12. (Croatia) Ivan Dodig / (Brazil) Marcelo Melo (final)
13. (France) Michaël Llodra / (France) Nicolas Mahut (second round)
14. (India) Rohan Bopanna / (France) Édouard Roger-Vasselin (semifinals)
15. (Poland) Łukasz Kubot / (Poland) Marcin Matkowski (third round)
16. (Philippines) Treat Huey / (United Kingdom) Dominic Inglot (third round)

Click on the seed number of a player to go to their draw section.

== Draw ==
=== Key ===
- Q = Qualifier
- WC = Wild card
- LL = Lucky loser
- Alt = Alternate
- ITF = ITF entry
- PR = Protected ranking
- SR = Special ranking
- SE = Special exempt
- JE = Junior exempt
- JR = Junior Accelerator Programme entrant
- CO = College Accelerator Programme entrant
- NG = Next Gen Accelerator Program entrant
- w/o = Walkover
- r = Retired
- d = Defaulted

=== Finals ===
Quarterfinals
1	(United States) Bob Bryan (United States) Mike Bryan	7^{7}	7^{7}	7^{7}
8	(India) Mahesh Bhupathi (Austria) Julian Knowle	6^{5}	6^{3}	6^{4}
14	(India) Rohan Bopanna (France) Édouard Roger-Vasselin	7	7^{7}	6^{4}	6^{3}	6
6	(Sweden) Robert Lindstedt (Canada) Daniel Nestor	5	6^{3}	7^{7}	7^{7}	2
11	(France) Julien Benneteau (Serbia) Nenad Zimonjić	6	4	3	4
4	(India) Leander Paes (Czech Republic) Radek Štěpánek	4	6	6	6
12	(Croatia) Ivan Dodig (Brazil) Marcelo Melo	7	6	6^{0}	6
(United States) James Blake (Austria) Jürgen Melzer	5	0	7^{7}	4

Semifinals
1	(United States) Bob Bryan (United States) Mike Bryan	6^{4}	6	6	5	6
14	(India) Rohan Bopanna (France) Édouard Roger-Vasselin	7^{7}	4	3	7	3
4	(India) Leander Paes (Czech Republic) Radek Štěpánek	6	4	1	6	3
12	(Croatia) Ivan Dodig (Brazil) Marcelo Melo	3	6	6	3	6

Final
1	(United States) Bob Bryan (United States) Mike Bryan	3	6	6	6
12	(Croatia) Ivan Dodig (Brazil) Marcelo Melo	6	3	4	4

=== Top half ===
==== Section 1 ====
First round
1	(United States) B Bryan (United States) M Bryan	6	6	6
(Brazil) M Demoliner (Brazil) A Sá	4	4	1
(Spain) D Marrero (Italy) A Seppi	6	7	6
WC	(United Kingdom) J Baker (United Kingdom) K Edmund	4	5	2
LL	(United States) D Kudla (United States) T Smyczek	2	7^{7}	4	1
(Germany) A Begemann (Germany) M Emmrich	6	6^{4}	6	6
(Spain) R Bautista Agut (Spain) D Gimeno Traver	3	4	5
16	(Philippines) T Huey (United Kingdom) D Inglot	6	6	7
10	(Mexico) S González (United States) S Lipsky	6	7^{7}	6
(Italy) P Lorenzi (France) B Paire	4	6^{3}	4
(Czech Republic) L Dlouhý (United States) R Ram	2	4	1
Q	(Canada) J Levine (Canada) V Pospisil	6	6	6
Q	(India) P Raja (India) D Sharan	7^{7}	6	3	4	4
(United States) N Monroe (Germany) S Stadler	6^{4}	2	6	6	6
(Argentina) L Mayer (Spain) A Ramos Viñolas	2	7^{7}	4	2
8	(India) M Bhupathi (Austria) J Knowle	6	6^{5}	6	6

Second round
1	(United States) B Bryan (United States) M Bryan	6	7	6
(Spain) D Marrero (Italy) A Seppi	3	5	4
(Germany) A Begemann (Germany) M Emmrich	3	7^{7}	5	6^{3}
16	(Philippines) T Huey (United Kingdom) D Inglot	6	6^{2}	7	7^{7}
10	(Mexico) S González (United States) S Lipsky	6	6^{3}	4	6	3
Q	(Canada) J Levine (Canada) V Pospisil	4	7^{7}	6	3	6
(United States) N Monroe (Germany) S Stadler	6	4	4	2
8	(India) M Bhupathi (Austria) J Knowle	3	6	6	6

Third round
1	(United States) B Bryan (United States) M Bryan	7	6	7^{7}
16	(Philippines) T Huey (United Kingdom) D Inglot	5	3	6^{3}
Q	(Canada) J Levine (Canada) V Pospisil	2	4	6	4
8	(India) M Bhupathi (Austria) J Knowle	6	6	3	6

Quarterfinals
1	(United States) B Bryan (United States) M Bryan	7^{7}	7^{7}	7^{7}
8	(India) M Bhupathi (Austria) J Knowle	6^{5}	6^{3}	6^{4}

==== Section 2 ====
First round
3	(Austria) A Peya (Brazil) B Soares	6	3	6	6
(United States) E Butorac (Israel) A Ram	4	6	3	4
(Australia) P Hanley (Australia) J-P Smith	6	1	7^{7}	6
(Germany) P Marx (Romania) F Mergea	3	6	6^{5}	4
(Italy) F Fognini (Italy) P Starace	4	4	4
(Germany) D Brands (Czech Republic) L Rosol	6	6	6
(Finland) J Nieminen (Russia) D Tursunov	6^{5}	2	6^{6}
14	(India) R Bopanna (France) É Roger-Vasselin	7^{7}	6	7^{8}
9	(United Kingdom) C Fleming (United Kingdom) J Marray	7^{7}	4	6	6
(Slovakia) M Kližan (Slovakia) I Zelenay	6^{4}	6	3	4
(Spain) P Andújar (Spain) G García López	7^{9}	7^{7}	4	5	2
(Czech Republic) F Čermák (Slovakia) M Mertiňák	6^{7}	6^{5}	6	7	6
(Netherlands) R Haase (Netherlands) I Sijsling	4	7^{9}	3	4
(Argentina) E Schwank (Argentina) H Zeballos	6	6^{7}	6	6
(Russia) M Elgin (Uzbekistan) D Istomin	6^{6}	3	7^{11}	6^{2}
6	(Sweden) R Lindstedt (Canada) D Nestor	7^{8}	6	6^{9}	7^{7}

Second round
3	(Austria) A Peya (Brazil) B Soares	4	6	6^{6}	7	10
(Australia) P Hanley (Australia) J-P Smith	6	1	7^{8}	5	8
(Germany) D Brands (Czech Republic) L Rosol	3	7	6^{4}	7^{10}	4
14	(India) R Bopanna (France) É Roger-Vasselin	6	5	7^{7}	6^{8}	6
9	(United Kingdom) C Fleming (United Kingdom) J Marray	6	6	7^{9}
(Czech Republic) F Čermák (Slovakia) M Mertiňák	3	4	6^{7}
(Argentina) E Schwank (Argentina) H Zeballos	1	5	3
6	(Sweden) R Lindstedt (Canada) D Nestor	6	7	6

Third round
3	(Austria) A Peya (Brazil) B Soares	4	6	6^{5}	2
14	(India) R Bopanna (France) É Roger-Vasselin	6	4	7^{7}	6
9	(United Kingdom) C Fleming (United Kingdom) J Marray	6^{5}	5	3
6	(Sweden) R Lindstedt (Canada) D Nestor	7^{7}	7	6

Quarterfinals
14	(India) R Bopanna (France) É Roger-Vasselin	7	7^{7}	6^{4}	6^{3}	6
6	(Sweden) R Lindstedt (Canada) D Nestor	5	6^{3}	7^{7}	7^{7}	2

=== Bottom half ===
==== Section 3 ====
First round
5	(Pakistan) A-u-H Qureshi (Netherlands) J-J Rojer	7^{7}	6	6
LL	(Germany) D Brown (Australia) R Junaid	6^{5}	4	4
(Belgium) X Malisse (United Kingdom) K Skupski	7^{7}	6^{4}	6	6
(Russia) E Donskoy (Russia) A Kuznetsov	6^{5}	7^{7}	0	1
(Bulgaria) G Dimitrov (Denmark) F Nielsen	6	1
(Australia) B Tomic (Serbia) V Troicki	3	2^{r}
(Slovakia) L Lacko (Slovakia) F Polášek	6	3	7^{7}	2	1
11	(France) J Benneteau (Serbia) N Zimonjić	3	6	6^{4}	6	6
15	(Poland) Ł Kubot (Poland) M Matkowski	6	6	7
(Sweden) J Brunström (South Africa) R Klaasen	3	4	5
WC	(United Kingdom) D Rice (United Kingdom) S Thornley	4	3	7^{9}	6	4
(Australia) M Matosevic (Germany) F Moser	6	6	6^{7}	4	6
(United Kingdom) J Delgado (Australia) M Ebden	6	7	7^{7}
WC	(Australia) L Hewitt (The Bahamas) M Knowles	3	5	6^{4}
(Italy) D Bracciali (Israel) J Erlich	6^{6}	4	7^{7}	4
4	(India) L Paes (Czech Republic) R Štěpánek	7^{8}	6	6^{1}	6

Second round
5	(Pakistan) A-u-H Qureshi (Netherlands) J-J Rojer	6	6^{1}	6	6^{5}	8
(Belgium) X Malisse (United Kingdom) K Skupski	3	7^{7}	3	7^{7}	6
(Bulgaria) G Dimitrov (Denmark) F Nielsen	7^{7}	3	7	2	6
11	(France) J Benneteau (Serbia) N Zimonjić	6^{3}	6	5	6	8
15	(Poland) Ł Kubot (Poland) M Matkowski	2	4	6	6	6
(Australia) M Matosevic (Germany) F Moser	6	6	2	2	1
(United Kingdom) J Delgado (Australia) M Ebden	4	4	3
4	(India) L Paes (Czech Republic) R Štěpánek	6	6	6

Third round
5	(Pakistan) A-u-H Qureshi (Netherlands) J-J Rojer	6	6	6^{1}	6^{4}	3
11	(France) J Benneteau (Serbia) N Zimonjić	3	4	7^{7}	7^{7}	6
15	(Poland) Ł Kubot (Poland) M Matkowski	4	2	4
4	(India) L Paes (Czech Republic) R Štěpánek	6	6	6

Quarterfinals
11	(France) J Benneteau (Serbia) N Zimonjić	6	4	3	4
4	(India) L Paes (Czech Republic) R Štěpánek	4	6	6	6

==== Section 4 ====
First round
7	(Belarus) M Mirnyi (Romania) H Tecău	4	7	6	6
Q	(Germany) D Meffert (Austria) P Oswald	6	5	3	4
Q	(Australia) S Groth (Australia) C Guccione	7^{7}	7^{8}	6
LL	(United States) S Johnson (Sweden) A Siljeström	6^{5}	6^{6}	3
(Lithuania) R Berankis (Chinese Taipei) Y-h Lu	2	4	1
(Poland) T Bednarek (Poland) M Kowalczyk	6	6	6
(Colombia) S Giraldo (United States) M Russell	3	6^{3}	2
12	(Croatia) I Dodig (Brazil) M Melo	6	7^{7}	6
13	(France) M Llodra (France) N Mahut	5
(Czech Republic) J Hájek (Czech Republic) J Levinský	4^{r}
(United States) J Blake (Austria) J Melzer	3	6	6	3	14
(United Kingdom) J Murray (Australia) J Peers	6	3	4	6	12
(Slovenia) A Bedene (Slovenia) G Žemlja	3	4	7	6^{3}
(Thailand) Sa Ratiwatana (Thailand) So Ratiwatana	6	6	5	7^{7}
(Colombia) JS Cabal (Colombia) R Farah	6^{1}	7	7	7^{7}
2	(Spain) M Granollers (Spain) M López	7^{7}	5	5	6^{5}

Second round
7	(Belarus) M Mirnyi (Romania) H Tecău	6	6^{6}	7^{7}	7
Q	(Australia) S Groth (Australia) C Guccione	4	7^{8}	6^{2}	5
(Poland) T Bednarek (Poland) M Kowalczyk	6^{2}	5	4
12	(Croatia) I Dodig (Brazil) M Melo	7^{7}	7	6
13	(France) M Llodra (France) N Mahut	4	0	1
(United States) J Blake (Austria) J Melzer	6	6	6
(Thailand) Sa Ratiwatana (Thailand) So Ratiwatana	6	6^{5}	6	3	4
(Colombia) JS Cabal (Colombia) R Farah	3	7^{7}	3	6	6

Third round
7	(Belarus) M Mirnyi (Romania) H Tecău	7^{8}	6	4	2	4
12	(Croatia) I Dodig (Brazil) M Melo	6^{6}	2	6	6	6
(United States) J Blake (Austria) J Melzer	6	6	6
(Colombia) JS Cabal (Colombia) R Farah	2	4	3

Quarterfinals
12	(Croatia) I Dodig (Brazil) M Melo	7	6	6^{0}	6
(United States) J Blake (Austria) J Melzer	5	0	7^{7}	4
