= 2013 Wimbledon Championships – Women's doubles =

Women's doubles
- 2013 Wimbledon Championships

Final
- Champions: (Chinese Taipei) Hsieh Su-wei (China) Peng Shuai
- Runners-up: (Australia) Ashleigh Barty (Australia) Casey Dellacqua
- Score: 7–6^{(7–1)}, 6–1

Details
- Draw: 64 (4 Q / 5 WC )
- Seeds: 16

Events
Singles	men	women		boys	girls
Doubles	men	women	mixed	boys	girls
WC Singles	men	women	quad
WC Doubles	men	women	quad
Legends	men	women	seniors
← 2012 ·	Wimbledon Championships	· 2014 →

Serena and Venus Williams were the defending champions, but could not defend after Venus withdrew with a back injury before the start of competition.

Hsieh Su-wei and Peng Shuai defeated Ashleigh Barty and Casey Dellacqua in the final, 7–6^{(7–1)}, 6–1 to win the ladies' doubles tennis title at the 2013 Wimbledon Championships.

== Seeds ==
1. (Italy) Sara Errani / (Italy) Roberta Vinci (third round)
2. (Czech Republic) Andrea Hlaváčková / (Czech Republic) Lucie Hradecká (quarterfinals)
3. (Russia) Nadia Petrova / (Slovenia) Katarina Srebotnik (quarterfinals)
4. (Russia) Ekaterina Makarova / (Russia) Elena Vesnina (third round)
5. (United States) Raquel Kops-Jones / (United States) Abigail Spears (third round)
6. (United States) Liezel Huber / (India) Sania Mirza (third round)
7. (Germany) Anna-Lena Grönefeld / (Czech Republic) Květa Peschke (semifinals)
8. (Chinese Taipei) Hsieh Su-wei / (China) Peng Shuai (champions)
9. (Russia) Anastasia Pavlyuchenkova / (Czech Republic) Lucie Šafářová (first round)
10. (France) Kristina Mladenovic / (Kazakhstan) Galina Voskoboeva (second round)
11. (Zimbabwe) Cara Black / (New Zealand) Marina Erakovic (second round)
12. (Australia) Ashleigh Barty / (Australia) Casey Dellacqua (final)
13. (United States) Vania King / (China) Zheng Jie (third round)
14. (Slovakia) Daniela Hantuchová / (Russia) Maria Kirilenko (second round, withdrew)
15. (Chinese Taipei) Chan Hao-ching / (Spain) Anabel Medina Garrigues (first round)
16. (Germany) Julia Görges / (Czech Republic) Barbora Záhlavová-Strýcová (quarterfinals)

Click on the seed number of a player to go to their draw section.

== Draw ==
=== Key ===
- Q = Qualifier
- WC = Wild card
- LL = Lucky loser
- Alt = Alternate
- ITF = ITF entry
- PR = Protected ranking
- SR = Special ranking
- SE = Special exempt
- JE = Junior exempt
- JR = Junior Accelerator Programme entrant
- CO = College Accelerator Programme entrant
- NG = Next Gen Accelerator Program entrant
- w/o = Walkover
- r = Retired
- d = Defaulted

=== Finals ===
Quarterfinals
16	(Germany) Julia Görges (Czech Republic) Barbora Záhlavová-Strýcová	6^{6}	7	4
(Japan) Shuko Aoyama (South Africa) Chanelle Scheepers	7^{8}	5	6
(Serbia) Jelena Janković (Croatia) Mirjana Lučić-Baroni	4	5
8	(Chinese Taipei) Hsieh Su-wei (China) Peng Shuai	6	7
7	(Germany) Anna-Lena Grönefeld (Czech Republic) Květa Peschke	7^{7}	6
3	(Russia) Nadia Petrova (Slovenia) Katarina Srebotnik	6^{2}	3
12	(Australia) Ashleigh Barty (Australia) Casey Dellacqua	2	6	6
2	(Czech Republic) Andrea Hlaváčková (Czech Republic) Lucie Hradecká	6	2	4

Semifinals
(Japan) Shuko Aoyama (South Africa) Chanelle Scheepers	4	3
8	(Chinese Taipei) Hsieh Su-wei (China) Peng Shuai	6	6
7	(Germany) Anna-Lena Grönefeld (Czech Republic) Květa Peschke	6^{6}	2
12	(Australia) Ashleigh Barty (Australia) Casey Dellacqua	7^{8}	6

Final
8	(Chinese Taipei) Hsieh Su-wei (China) Peng Shuai	7^{7}	6
12	(Australia) Ashleigh Barty (Australia) Casey Dellacqua	6^{1}	1

=== Top half ===
==== Section 1 ====
First round
1	(Italy) S Errani (Italy) R Vinci	6	6
WC	(United Kingdom) A Keothavong (United Kingdom) J Konta	3	1
(Germany) A Beck (Ukraine) I Buryachok	5	7^{8}	3
(South Africa) N Grandin (Czech Republic) V Uhlířová	7	6^{6}	6
WC	(United Kingdom) N Slater (United Kingdom) L Whybourn	6	5	4
(France) A Cornet (France) P Parmentier	4	7	6
(Romania) I-C Begu (Slovakia) J Husárová	3	4
16	(Germany) J Görges (Czech Republic) B Záhlavová-Strýcová	6	6
9	(Russia) A Pavlyuchenkova (Czech Republic) L Šafářová	6	3	4
(Japan) S Aoyama (South Africa) C Scheepers	3	6	6
Q	(Romania) R Olaru (Ukraine) O Savchuk	6	6
(Hungary) T Babos (Luxembourg) M Minella	2	4
(Italy) F Pennetta (Germany) A Petkovic	6	2	6
WC	(United Kingdom) S Murray (United Kingdom) J Windley	0	6	2
(Czech Republic) K Zakopalová (Czech Republic) R Voráčová	3	6	1
6	(United States) L Huber (India) S Mirza	6	3	6

Second round
1	(Italy) S Errani (Italy) R Vinci	6	6
(South Africa) N Grandin (Czech Republic) V Uhlířová	2	3
(France) A Cornet (France) P Parmentier	4	0
16	(Germany) J Görges (Czech Republic) B Záhlavová-Strýcová	6	6
(Japan) S Aoyama (South Africa) C Scheepers	5	6	6
Q	(Romania) R Olaru (Ukraine) O Savchuk	7	3	2
(Italy) F Pennetta (Germany) A Petkovic	6^{6}	6	2
6	(United States) L Huber (India) S Mirza	7^{8}	3	6

Third round
1	(Italy) S Errani (Italy) R Vinci	6	3	2
16	(Germany) J Görges (Czech Republic) B Záhlavová-Strýcová	3	6	6
(Japan) S Aoyama (South Africa) C Scheepers	6	3	6
6	(United States) L Huber (India) S Mirza	2	6	2

Quarterfinals
16	(Germany) J Görges (Czech Republic) B Záhlavová-Strýcová	6^{6}	7	4
(Japan) S Aoyama (South Africa) C Scheepers	7^{8}	5	6

==== Section 2 ====
First round
4	(Russia) E Makarova (Russia) E Vesnina	6	6
(Czech Republic) K Plíšková (Spain) MT Torró Flor	2	1
(Japan) K Date-Krumm (Spain) A Parra Santonja	6^{6}	6	3
(United States) C McHale (Austria) T Paszek	7^{8}	2	6
(Romania) S Cîrstea (Japan) A Morita	3	3
(Belgium) K Flipkens (Slovakia) M Rybáriková	6	6
(Serbia) J Janković (Croatia) M Lučić-Baroni	2	6	6
15	(Chinese Taipei) H-c Chan (Spain) A Medina Garrigues	6	2	1
10	(France) K Mladenovic (Kazakhstan) G Voskoboeva	6	6
(Sweden) S Arvidsson (Sweden) J Larsson	2	0
(Croatia) D Jurak (Thailand) T Tanasugarn	3	6	7
(Belarus) O Govortsova (Poland) A Rosolska	6	2	5
(Romania) S Halep (Georgia (country)) A Tatishvili	6	3	3
Q	(France) S Foretz Gacon (Czech Republic) E Hrdinová	2	6	6
(Russia) V Dushevina (Russia) A Panova	5	1
8	(Chinese Taipei) S-w Hsieh (China) S Peng	7	6

Second round
4	(Russia) E Makarova (Russia) E Vesnina	7^{10}	6
(United States) C McHale (Austria) T Paszek	6^{8}	1
(Belgium) K Flipkens (Slovakia) M Rybáriková	3	6	3
(Serbia) J Janković (Croatia) M Lučić-Baroni	6	4	6
10	(France) K Mladenovic (Kazakhstan) G Voskoboeva	6	6^{4}	4
(Croatia) D Jurak (Thailand) T Tanasugarn	1	7^{7}	6
Q	(France) S Foretz Gacon (Czech Republic) E Hrdinová	6	3	4
8	(Chinese Taipei) S-w Hsieh (China) S Peng	4	6	6

Third round
4	(Russia) E Makarova (Russia) E Vesnina	3	2
(Serbia) J Janković (Croatia) M Lučić-Baroni	6	6
(Croatia) D Jurak (Thailand) T Tanasugarn	4	4
8	(Chinese Taipei) S-w Hsieh (China) S Peng	6	6

Quarterfinals
(Serbia) J Janković (Croatia) M Lučić-Baroni	4	5
8	(Chinese Taipei) S-w Hsieh (China) S Peng	6	7

=== Bottom half ===
==== Section 3 ====
First round
7	(Germany) A-L Grönefeld (Czech Republic) K Peschke	6	7
(Slovakia) D Cibulková (Romania) M Niculescu	4	5
(Italy) F Schiavone (Australia) S Stosur	3	1
(United States) L Raymond (United Kingdom) L Robson	6	6
(Spain) L Arruabarrena (Puerto Rico) M Puig	2	3
(Canada) E Bouchard (Croatia) P Martić	6	6
(Bosnia and Herzegovina) M Jugić-Salkić (United Kingdom) H Watson	2	0
11	(Zimbabwe) C Black (New Zealand) M Erakovic	6	6
13	(United States) V King (China) J Zheng	6	6
(Serbia) V Dolonc (Serbia) B Jovanovski	3	0
(Bulgaria) T Pironkova (Belgium) Y Wickmayer	6	6
(United States) M Keys (United States) M Oudin	4	1
(Czech Republic) E Birnerová (Switzerland) S Vögele	2	2
(United States) V Lepchenko (China) S Zheng	6	6
(Spain) L Domínguez Lino (Spain) G Muguruza	1	2
3	(Russia) N Petrova (Slovenia) K Srebotnik	6	6

Second round
7	(Germany) A-L Grönefeld (Czech Republic) K Peschke	6	6
(United States) L Raymond (United Kingdom) L Robson	4	4
(Canada) E Bouchard (Croatia) P Martić	7^{8}	7^{7}
11	(Zimbabwe) C Black (New Zealand) M Erakovic	6^{6}	6^{4}
13	(United States) V King (China) J Zheng	6	6
(Bulgaria) T Pironkova (Belgium) Y Wickmayer	1	3
(United States) V Lepchenko (China) S Zheng	5	3
3	(Russia) N Petrova (Slovenia) K Srebotnik	7	6

Third round
7	(Germany) A-L Grönefeld (Czech Republic) K Peschke	6	6
(Canada) E Bouchard (Croatia) P Martić	4	4
13	(United States) V King (China) J Zheng	3	2
3	(Russia) N Petrova (Slovenia) K Srebotnik	6	6

Quarterfinals
7	(Germany) A-L Grönefeld (Czech Republic) K Peschke	7^{7}	6
3	(Russia) N Petrova (Slovenia) K Srebotnik	6^{2}	3

==== Section 4 ====
First round
5	(United States) R Kops-Jones (United States) A Spears	6	6
WC	(Israel) S Pe'er (China) Z Yan	4	4
(Austria) S Klemenschits (Switzerland) R Oprandi	6	4	6
(Colombia) C Castaño (Hungary) K Marosi	4	6	4
(Germany) M Barthel (Latvia) L Dekmeijere	4	7	2
(United States) M Moulton-Levy (China) S Zhang	6	5	6
Q	(Russia) V Solovyeva (Ukraine) M Zanevska	2	5
12	(Australia) A Barty (Australia) C Dellacqua	6	7
14	(Slovakia) D Hantuchová (Russia) M Kirilenko	6	6
Q	(Argentina) M Irigoyen (Argentina) P Ormaechea	1	4
(Spain) S Soler Espinosa (Spain) C Suárez Navarro	6	7^{7}
WC	(United Kingdom) T Moore (United Kingdom) M South	4	6^{3}
(Slovakia) J Čepelová (Georgia (country)) O Kalashnikova	4	6	6
(United States) I Falconi (Germany) T Maria	6	1	1
(Russia) A Kudryavtseva (Australia) A Rodionova	5	2
2	(Czech Republic) A Hlaváčková (Czech Republic) L Hradecká	7	6

Second round
5	(United States) R Kops-Jones (United States) A Spears	6	6
(Austria) S Klemenschits (Switzerland) R Oprandi	1	1
(United States) M Moulton-Levy (China) S Zhang	3	2
12	(Australia) A Barty (Australia) C Dellacqua	6	6
14	(Slovakia) D Hantuchová (Russia) M Kirilenko	w/o
(Spain) S Soler Espinosa (Spain) C Suárez Navarro
(Slovakia) J Čepelová (Georgia (country)) O Kalashnikova	1	1
2	(Czech Republic) A Hlaváčková (Czech Republic) L Hradecká	6	6

Third round
5	(United States) R Kops-Jones (United States) A Spears	4	1
12	(Australia) A Barty (Australia) C Dellacqua	6	6
(Spain) S Soler Espinosa (Spain) C Suárez Navarro	4	3
2	(Czech Republic) A Hlaváčková (Czech Republic) L Hradecká	6	6

Quarterfinals
12	(Australia) A Barty (Australia) C Dellacqua	2	6	6
2	(Czech Republic) A Hlaváčková (Czech Republic) L Hradecká	6	2	4
