= 2013 Wimbledon Championships =

- Date: 24 June – 7 July
- Edition: 127th
- Category: Grand Slam (ITF)
- Draw: 128S / 64D / 48XD
- Prize money: £22,560,000
- Surface: Grass
- Location: Church Road; SW19, Wimbledon, London, United Kingdom
- Venue: All England Lawn Tennis and Croquet Club

Champions

Men's singles
- (United Kingdom) Andy Murray

Women's singles
- (France) Marion Bartoli

Men's doubles
- (United States) Bob Bryan / (United States) Mike Bryan

Women's doubles
- (Chinese Taipei) Hsieh Su-wei / (China) Peng Shuai

Mixed doubles
- (Canada) Daniel Nestor / (France) Kristina Mladenovic

Wheelchair men's doubles
- (France) Stéphane Houdet / (Japan) Shingo Kunieda

Wheelchair women's doubles
- (Netherlands) Jiske Griffioen / (Netherlands) Aniek van Koot

Boys' singles
- (Italy) Gianluigi Quinzi

Girls' singles
- (Switzerland) Belinda Bencic

Boys' doubles
- (Australia) Thanasi Kokkinakis / (Australia) Nick Kyrgios

Girls' doubles
- (Czech Republic) Barbora Krejčíková / (Czech Republic) Kateřina Siniaková

Gentlemen's invitation doubles
- (Sweden) Thomas Enqvist / (Australia) Mark Philippoussis

Ladies' invitation doubles
- (United States) Lindsay Davenport / (Switzerland) Martina Hingis

Senior gentlemen's invitation doubles
- (Australia) Pat Cash / (Australia) Mark Woodforde
- Wimbledon Championships

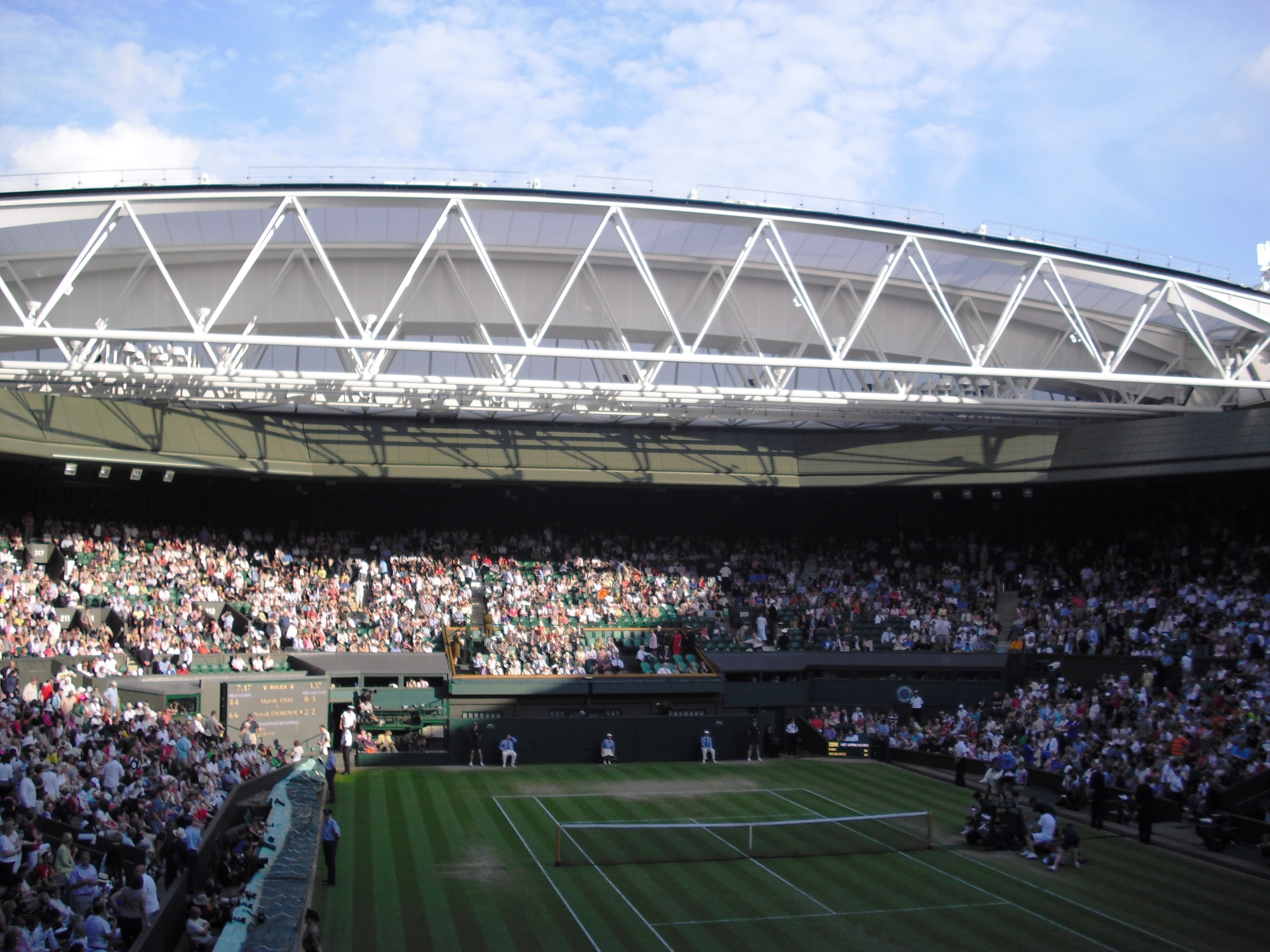
All England Lawn Tennis and Croquet Club, Wimbledon

The 2013 Wimbledon Championships was a tennis tournament played on grass courts at the All England Lawn Tennis and Croquet Club in Wimbledon, London in the United Kingdom. It was the 127th edition of the Wimbledon Championships and were held from 24 June to 7 July 2013. It was the third Grand Slam tennis event of the year and was part of the ATP World Tour, the WTA Tour, the ITF Junior Tour and the NEC Tour. The championships were organised by the All England Lawn Tennis and Croquet Club and the International Tennis Federation.

Roger Federer and Serena Williams were the defending champions in singles events, but neither was able to repeat their success: Federer was eliminated in the second round by Sergiy Stakhovsky, and Williams lost in the fourth round to Sabine Lisicki. This marked the first time since 1927 that both defending champions were eliminated before the quarterfinals. Federer and Williams were two of a number of big-name casualties in the early rounds, along with two-time champion Rafael Nadal, two-time semifinalist Jo-Wilfried Tsonga, 2004 champion Maria Sharapova and former World No. 1s Victoria Azarenka, Ana Ivanovic, Lleyton Hewitt, Caroline Wozniacki and Jelena Janković.

Andy Murray became the first man from Great Britain to win the singles title since Fred Perry in 1936. Marion Bartoli won the women's singles title. Bob and Mike Bryan completed the "Bryan Slam" and became the first team to hold all four Grand Slams and the Olympic Gold at the same time.

== Tournament ==
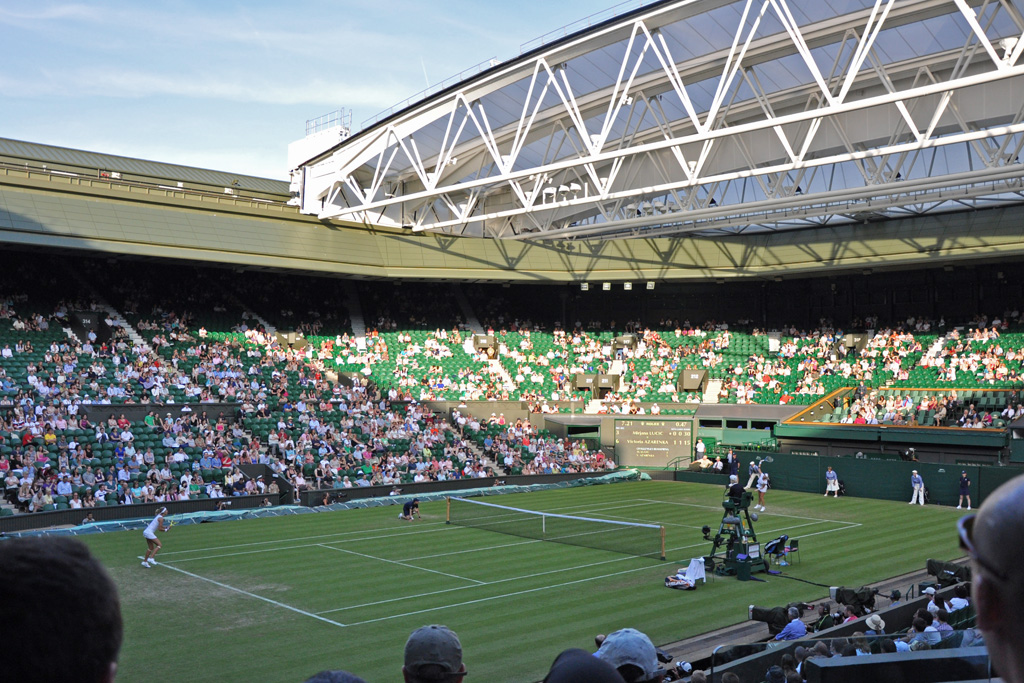
Centre Court, where the Finals of Wimbledon take place

The 2013 Wimbledon Championships was the 127th edition of the tournament and was held at All England Lawn Tennis and Croquet Club in London.

The tournament was an event run by the International Tennis Federation (ITF) and was part of the 2013 ATP World Tour and the 2013 WTA Tour calendars under the Grand Slam category. The tournament consisted of both men's and women's singles and doubles draws as well as a mixed doubles event.

There were singles and doubles events for both boys and girls (players under 18), which was part of the Grade A category of tournaments, and doubles events for men's and women's wheelchair tennis players as part of the NEC tour under the Grand Slam category. The tournament was played on grass courts and was taking place over a series of 19 courts, including the four main showcourts, Centre Court, No. 1 Court, No. 2 Court and No. 3 Court.

== Notable events ==
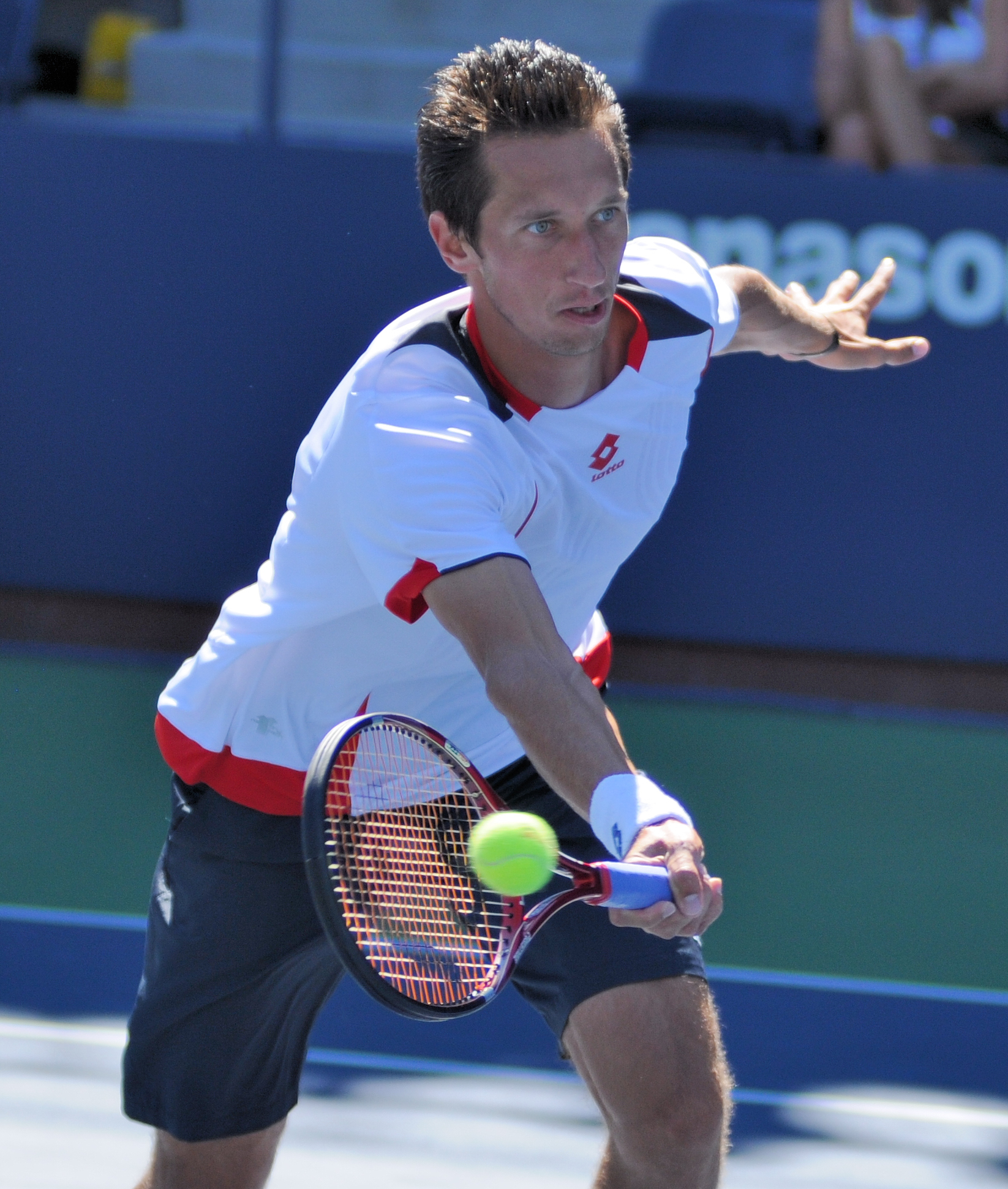
Sergiy Stakhovsky caused an upset in the second round by defeating seven-time champion Roger Federer

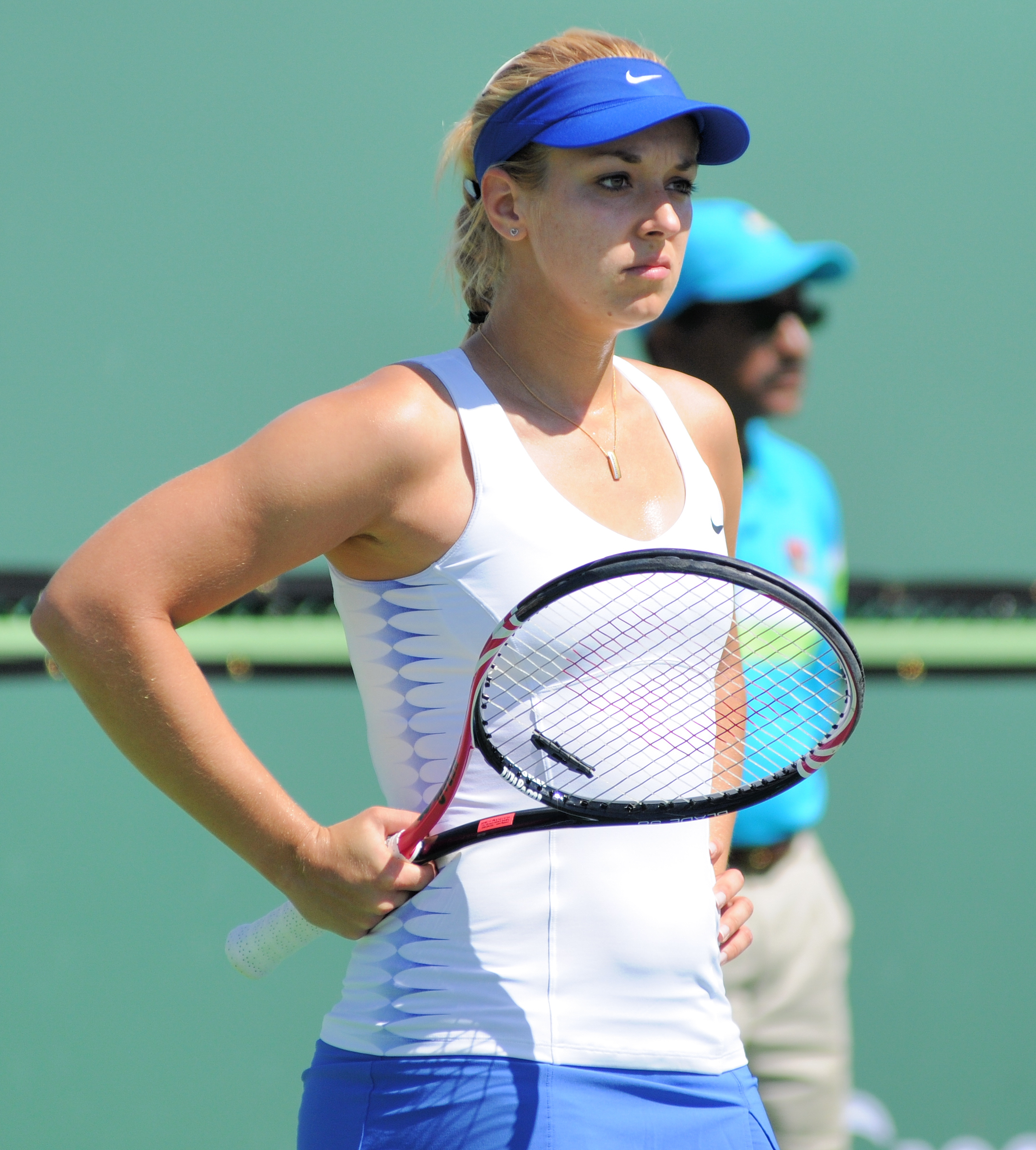
Sabine Lisicki caused one of the biggest upsets of the tournament by defeating reigning Wimbledon, US Open and French Open champion, world number one, Serena Williams, in the fourth round

- Rafael Nadal suffered his first ever opening round defeat at a Grand Slam tournament when he lost to Steve Darcis in the first round. This also marked the first time since 1997 in which the reigning French Open men's champion lost in the first round at Wimbledon. Women's fifth seed Sara Errani also made a first round exit, losing to Monica Puig in straight sets.
- By defeating Benjamin Becker in the first round, Andy Murray won his 107th Grand Slam match, thus becoming the most successful British man at a Major and breaking Fred Perry's total Grand Slam match win record of 106.
- The 2013 championship saw numerous players retire in the first two rounds due to fatigue or injury, including Marin Čilić, Jo-Wilfried Tsonga, Victoria Azarenka, John Isner, and first round surprise Steve Darcis. On Wednesday, 26 June a total of eight players, including seven in singles events, withdrew from the tournament; four of those made the decision before the starts of their matches.
- Third-ranked Roger Federer fell in the second round to world number 116 Sergiy Stakhovsky, his first loss in a Grand Slam earlier than the quarterfinals since 2004 French Open, a streak spanning 36 majors. Federer's world ranking dropped to No. 5 as a result of this early exit.
- Federer's second round loss also marked the worst collective performance by him and Rafael Nadal at a Grand Slam tournament, in which both men were entered. This also marked the first time since 2002 in which neither man made the Wimbledon final.
- For the first time since 1912, no U.S. man was represented in the third round at Wimbledon, following Bobby Reynolds's second round defeat to World No. 1 Novak Djokovic.
- Kimiko Date-Krumm became the oldest woman to reach the third round at Wimbledon, by defeating Alexandra Cadanțu in the second round. It was also the first time since the 1996 Wimbledon Championships in which she had gone this far. Her opponent, number one seed Serena Williams, combined for an age of 73, and this was their first ever meeting. Date-Krumm lost in straight sets in the late evening encounter on Saturday 29 June 2013.
- Of the top ten women's seeds that started the Championships, six fell before the third round: second seed Victoria Azarenka (second round, withdrew), third seed Maria Sharapova (second round), fifth seed Sara Errani (first round), seventh seed Angelique Kerber (second round), ninth seed Caroline Wozniacki (second round) and tenth seed Maria Kirilenko (first round). This marked the worst performance by any top ten seeds at a Grand Slam tournament in the Open Era.
- Laura Robson became the first British woman in 15 years to reach the fourth round at Wimbledon; by getting this far, she entered the Top 30 for the first time in her career. She thus became the first British woman since Jo Durie in 1987 to enter the WTA's Top 30.
- Łukasz Kubot and Fernando Verdasco both reached the quarter-finals of Wimbledon for the first time, whilst Juan Martín del Potro reached his first Grand Slam semi-final since winning the 2009 US Open.
- Sloane Stephens and Kirsten Flipkens both reached the quarter-finals at Wimbledon for the first time.
- Sabine Lisicki continued her record of beating the reigning French Open champion at Wimbledon. She defeated Serena Williams in the fourth round, having also beaten Svetlana Kuznetsova in 2009, Li Na in 2011 and Maria Sharapova in 2012. Lisicki's victory also denied Serena her 35th consecutive victory, a record which was achieved by her older sister, Venus, in 2000.
- This tournament marked the worst collective performance by Williams, Victoria Azarenka and Maria Sharapova at a Grand Slam event since the 2008 French Open, and also the first tournament since the 2011 French Open in which none of the three reached a Grand Slam final.
- Jerzy Janowicz became the first male Polish player to reach the semi-finals of a Grand Slam tournament.
- By reaching the Wimbledon final, Sabine Lisicki became the first German Grand Slam singles finalist since Rainer Schüttler reached the final of the 2003 Australian Open, and the first German singles finalist at Wimbledon since Steffi Graf in 1999.
- Novak Djokovic won his semi-final match against Juan Martín del Potro in five sets in 4 hours 44 minutes. This was the longest semi-final in the history of the Wimbledon Championships.
- With her win in the Ladies' Singles final, Marion Bartoli surpassed the female record set by Jana Novotná at the 1998 Wimbledon Championships for most appearances in a Grand Slam tournament before winning a title, with 47.
- In winning the Gentlemen's Doubles, Bob and Mike Bryan became the first men's doubles team in the Open era to hold all four Grand Slam titles at the same time, as well as the only team in history to hold all four Majors and the Olympic gold medal.
- Andy Murray defeated Novak Djokovic in the final in straight sets to win the 2013 Wimbledon Men Singles title, becoming the first British man in 77 years to do so, and the first Scot of either sex in 117 years to win a Wimbledon singles title.

=== First Wednesday ===
The first Wednesday (Wednesday 26 June) in the 2013 Wimbledon Championship saw a number of former world number ones knocked out in the second round of the draw either by being beaten by a much lower rank, having to retire early or having been "walked over". These players include Roger Federer, Maria Sharapova and Victoria Azarenka, as well as former ranking leaders Lleyton Hewitt, Ana Ivanovic, Jelena Janković and Caroline Wozniacki. Other notable players, including Jo-Wilfried Tsonga, Marin Čilić, John Isner, Steve Darcis, Yaroslava Shvedova and Radek Štěpánek also went out. A total of twelve seeded players (five men and seven women) finished their 2013 Wimbledon campaign on that day.

The events of "Black Wednesday" were widely discussed, inter alia, by the Association of Tennis Professionals and players and a statement from tournament Chief Executive Officer was released.

== Point and prize money distribution ==
=== Point distribution ===
Below is a series of tables for each of the competitions showing the ranking points on offer for each event.

==== Seniors points ====
Event	W	F	SF	QF	Round of 16	Round of 32	Round of 64	Round of 128	Q	Q3	Q2	Q1
Men's singles	2000	1200	720	360	180	90	45	10	25	16	8	0
Men's doubles	2000	1200	720	360	180	90	0	—N/a	25	—N/a	0	0
Women's singles	2000	1400	900	500	280	160	100	5	60	50	40	2
Women's doubles	2000	1400	900	500	280	160	5	—N/a	48	—N/a	0	0

==== Wheelchair points ====
Event	W	F	3rd	4th
Doubles	800	500	375	100

==== Junior points ====
Event	W	F	SF	QF	Round of 16	Round of 32	Q	Q3
Boys' singles	375	270	180	120	75	30	25	20
Girls' singles	375	270	180	120	75	30	25	20
Boys' doubles	270	180	120	75	45	—N/a	—N/a	—N/a
Girls' doubles	270	180	120	75	45	—N/a	—N/a	—N/a

=== Prize money ===
The Wimbledon total prize money for 2013 has been increased by forty percent to £22,560,000 (around $34m). The winners of the men's and women's singles titles earned £1.6m, up £450,000 from last year. In the 2013 season, the Wimbledon prize money was the highest out of four grand slam tournaments, compared to $30m at the Australian Open, $29m at French Open, and $32m at the US Open.

Event	W	F	SF	QF	Round of 16	Round of 32	Round of 64	Round of 128	Q3	Q2	Q1
Singles	£1,600,000	£800,000	£400,000	£205,000	£105,000	£63,000	£38,000	£23,500	£12,000	£6,000	£3,000
Doubles*	£300,000	£150,000	£75,000	£37,500	£20,000	£12,000	£7,750	—N/a	—N/a	—N/a	—N/a
Mixed doubles*	£92,000	£46,000	£23,000	£10,500	£5,200	£2,600	£1,300	—N/a	—N/a	—N/a	—N/a
Wheelchair doubles*	£8,500	£5,000	£3,250	£2,250	—N/a	—N/a	—N/a	—N/a	—N/a	—N/a	—N/a
Invitation doubles*	£20,000	£17,000	£14,000	£13,000	£12,000	—N/a	—N/a	—N/a	—N/a	—N/a	—N/a

_{* per team}

== Singles players ==
Men's singles

Champion		Runner-up	
(United Kingdom) Andy Murray [2]		(Serbia) Novak Djokovic [1]	
Semifinals out
(Argentina) Juan Martín del Potro [8]		(Poland) Jerzy Janowicz [24]	
Quarterfinals out
(Czech Republic) Tomáš Berdych [7]	(Spain) David Ferrer [4]	(Poland) Łukasz Kubot	(Spain) Fernando Verdasco
4th round out
(Germany) Tommy Haas [13]	(Australia) Bernard Tomic	(Croatia) Ivan Dodig	(Italy) Andreas Seppi [23]
(France) Adrian Mannarino	(Austria) Jürgen Melzer	(France) Kenny de Schepper	(Russia) Mikhail Youzhny [20]
3rd round out
(France) Jérémy Chardy [28]	(Spain) Feliciano López	(France) Richard Gasquet [9]	(South Africa) Kevin Anderson [27]
(Ukraine) Alexandr Dolgopolov [26]	(Netherlands) Igor Sijsling	(Japan) Kei Nishikori [12]	(Slovenia) Grega Žemlja
(France) Benoît Paire [25]	(Germany) Dustin Brown (Q)	(Spain) Nicolás Almagro [15]	(Ukraine) Sergiy Stakhovsky
(Latvia) Ernests Gulbis	(Argentina) Juan Mónaco [22]	(Serbia) Viktor Troicki	(Spain) Tommy Robredo [32]
2nd round out
(United States) Bobby Reynolds (Q)	(Germany) Jan-Lennard Struff (Q)	(France) Paul-Henri Mathieu	(Chinese Taipei) Jimmy Wang (Q)
(Japan) Go Soeda (Q)	(United States) James Blake	(Poland) Michał Przysiężny (Q)	(Germany) Daniel Brands
(Spain) Roberto Bautista Agut	(Colombia) Santiago Giraldo	(Canada) Milos Raonic [17]	(United States) Denis Kudla (Q)
(Argentina) Leonardo Mayer	(France) Michaël Llodra	(Bulgaria) Grigor Dimitrov [29]	(Canada) Jesse Levine
(Belgium) Steve Darcis	(France) Stéphane Robert (Q)	(United States) John Isner [18]	(Australia) Lleyton Hewitt
(France) Guillaume Rufin	(Czech Republic) Radek Štěpánek	(Germany) Julian Reister (Q)	(Switzerland) Roger Federer [3]
(France) Jo-Wilfried Tsonga [6]	(France) Julien Benneteau [31]	(United States) Rajeev Ram	(Croatia) Marin Čilić [10]
(Russia) Andrey Kuznetsov	(Canada) Vasek Pospisil	(France) Nicolas Mahut (WC)	(Chinese Taipei) Lu Yen-hsun
1st round out
(Germany) Florian Mayer	(United States) Steve Johnson (WC)	(Slovenia) Blaž Kavčič	(United States) Ryan Harrison
(France) Gilles Simon [19]	(Lithuania) Ričardas Berankis	(United States) Wayne Odesnik (Q)	(Russia) Dmitry Tursunov
(Spain) Marcel Granollers	(Austria) Andreas Haider-Maurer	(Netherlands) Thiemo de Bakker	(United States) Sam Querrey [21]
(Belgium) Olivier Rochus (LL)	(Germany) Philipp Petzschner	(Spain) Daniel Gimeno Traver	(Slovakia) Martin Kližan
(Argentina) Martín Alund	(Russia) Teymuraz Gabashvili (Q)	(Argentina) Horacio Zeballos	(Portugal) Gastão Elias
(Argentina) Carlos Berlocq	(United States) Alex Kuznetsov (Q)	(Australia) James Duckworth (Q)	(Germany) Philipp Kohlschreiber [16]
(Australia) Matthew Ebden (WC)	(Slovenia) Aljaž Bedene	(Finland) Jarkko Nieminen	(Uzbekistan) Denis Istomin
(Italy) Simone Bolelli	(United States) Michael Russell	(Argentina) Guido Pella	(Spain) Albert Ramos Viñolas
(Spain) Rafael Nadal [5]	(Russia) Igor Andreev	(Colombia) Alejandro Falla	(Romania) Adrian Ungur
(Russia) Evgeny Donskoy	(Spain) Pablo Andújar	(Spain) Guillermo García López	(Switzerland) Stan Wawrinka [11]
(Estonia) Jürgen Zopp	(Australia) Marinko Matosevic	(Australia) Matt Reid (Q)	(United Kingdom) Kyle Edmund (WC)
(Italy) Fabio Fognini [30]	(Czech Republic) Lukáš Rosol	(Brazil) Rogério Dutra Silva	(Romania) Victor Hănescu
(Belgium) David Goffin	(France) Édouard Roger-Vasselin	(Belgium) Xavier Malisse	(Germany) Tobias Kamke
(Germany) Bastian Knittel (Q)	(Slovakia) Lukáš Lacko	(Italy) Paolo Lorenzi	(Cyprus) Marcos Baghdatis
(Serbia) Janko Tipsarević [14]	(Spain) Albert Montañés	(France) Marc Gicquel	(Netherlands) Robin Haase
(Russia) Alex Bogomolov Jr.	(Czech Republic) Jan Hájek	(United Kingdom) James Ward (WC)	(Germany) Benjamin Becker

Women's singles

Champion		Runner-up	
(France) Marion Bartoli [15]		(Germany) Sabine Lisicki [23]	
Semifinals out
(Poland) Agnieszka Radwańska [4]		(Belgium) Kirsten Flipkens [20]	
Quarterfinals out
(Estonia) Kaia Kanepi	(China) Li Na [6]	(United States) Sloane Stephens [17]	(Czech Republic) Petra Kvitová [8]
4th round out
(United States) Serena Williams [1]	(United Kingdom) Laura Robson	(Bulgaria) Tsvetana Pironkova	(Italy) Roberta Vinci [11]
(Puerto Rico) Monica Puig	(Italy) Karin Knapp	(Spain) Carla Suárez Navarro [19]	(Italy) Flavia Pennetta
3rd round out
(Japan) Kimiko Date-Krumm	(Australia) Samantha Stosur [14]	(New Zealand) Marina Erakovic	(United States) Alison Riske (WC)
(United States) Madison Keys	(Croatia) Petra Martić	(Slovakia) Dominika Cibulková [18]	(Czech Republic) Klára Zakopalová [32]
(Czech Republic) Eva Birnerová (Q)	(Czech Republic) Petra Cetkovská (Q)	(Italy) Camila Giorgi	(Portugal) Michelle Larcher de Brito (Q)
(Russia) Ekaterina Makarova [25]	(Canada) Eugenie Bouchard	(Serbia) Vesna Dolonc	(France) Alizé Cornet [29]
2nd round out
(France) Caroline Garcia (Q)	(Romania) Alexandra Cadanțu	(Russia) Elena Vesnina	(Russia) Olga Puchkova
(Colombia) Mariana Duque Mariño (Q)	(China) Peng Shuai [24]	(Poland) Urszula Radwańska	(Germany) Angelique Kerber [7]
(France) Mathilde Johansson	(Germany) Mona Barthel [30]	(Czech Republic) Barbora Záhlavová-Strýcová (Q)	(Czech Republic) Karolína Plíšková
(Slovakia) Jana Čepelová	(Spain) María Teresa Torró Flor	(Germany) Annika Beck	(Romania) Simona Halep
(Spain) Sílvia Soler Espinosa	(Ukraine) Lesia Tsurenko	(Germany) Andrea Petkovic (WC)	(Denmark) Caroline Wozniacki [9]
(United States) Christina McHale	(Romania) Sorana Cîrstea [22]	(Czech Republic) Lucie Šafářová [27]	(Russia) Maria Sharapova [3]
(Kazakhstan) Yaroslava Shvedova	(Spain) Garbiñe Muguruza	(Croatia) Mirjana Lučić-Baroni	(Serbia) Ana Ivanovic [12]
(Serbia) Jelena Janković [16]	(Serbia) Bojana Jovanovski	(Chinese Taipei) Hsieh Su-wei	(Belarus) Victoria Azarenka [2]
1st round out
(Luxembourg) Mandy Minella	(China) Zheng Jie	(Germany) Carina Witthöft (Q)	(Austria) Tamira Paszek [28]
(Italy) Francesca Schiavone	(Czech Republic) Andrea Hlaváčková	(Netherlands) Arantxa Rus	(Slovakia) Anna Karolína Schmiedlová (LL)
(Russia) Maria Kirilenko [10]	(Germany) Julia Görges	(Japan) Ayumi Morita	(Spain) Anabel Medina Garrigues
(Switzerland) Romina Oprandi [31]	(United States) Mallory Burdette	(United Kingdom) Tara Moore (WC)	(United States) Bethanie Mattek-Sands
(Austria) Yvonne Meusburger (Q)	(Hungary) Tímea Babos	(United Kingdom) Heather Watson	(Romania) Monica Niculescu
(Russia) Anastasia Pavlyuchenkova [21]	(Slovakia) Magdaléna Rybáriková	(Georgia (country)) Anna Tatishvili	(Russia) Nadia Petrova [13]
(South Africa) Chanelle Scheepers	(Czech Republic) Kristýna Plíšková	(Romania) Irina-Camelia Begu	(Italy) Maria Elena Camerin (Q)
(Slovakia) Daniela Hantuchová	(Portugal) Nina Bratchikova	(Belarus) Olga Govortsova	(Netherlands) Michaëlla Krajicek (PR)
(Italy) Sara Errani [5]	(Japan) Misaki Doi	(Spain) Lara Arruabarrena	(United States) Varvara Lepchenko [26]
(United States) Jamie Hampton	(France) Pauline Parmentier	(Croatia) Donna Vekić	(Spain) Estrella Cabeza Candela
(Ukraine) Elina Svitolina	(United States) Alexa Glatch	(United Kingdom) Samantha Murray (WC)	(Switzerland) Stefanie Vögele
(United States) Lauren Davis	(Czech Republic) Lucie Hradecká (WC)	(United States) Melanie Oudin	(France) Kristina Mladenovic
(United States) CoCo Vandeweghe	(Netherlands) Kiki Bertens	(United Kingdom) Anne Keothavong (WC)	(Sweden) Johanna Larsson
(Spain) Lourdes Domínguez Lino	(Sweden) Sofia Arvidsson	(Kazakhstan) Galina Voskoboeva (Q)	(France) Virginie Razzano (Q)
(United Kingdom) Johanna Konta (WC)	(Belgium) Yanina Wickmayer	(Croatia) Ajla Tomljanović (Q)	(Kazakhstan) Yulia Putintseva
(United States) Vania King (LL)	(Germany) Tatjana Maria	(United Kingdom) Elena Baltacha (WC)	(Portugal) Maria João Koehler

== Champions ==
=== Seniors ===
==== Men's singles ====
(United Kingdom) Andy Murray def. (Serbia) Novak Djokovic, 6–4, 7–5, 6–4

- It was Murray's fourth title of the year and first Grand Slam title of the year. It was his first Wimbledon title, second Grand Slam title and 28th career title.

==== Women's singles ====
(France) Marion Bartoli def. (Germany) Sabine Lisicki, 6–1, 6–4

- It was Bartoli's first (and only) Grand Slam title in her career and eighth singles title overall. It was also her final Grand Slam appearance before she would retire in August 2013.

==== Men's doubles ====
(United States) Bob Bryan / (United States) Mike Bryan def. (Croatia) Ivan Dodig / (Brazil) Marcelo Melo, 3–6, 6–3, 6–4, 6–4

- It was the Bryan brothers' ninth title of the year and third Grand Slam title of the year. It was their third Wimbledon title, 15th Grand Slam title and 91st career title. They completed a non-calendar year Golden Slam and thus became the first double team in tennis history to hold all four majors as well as Olympic gold medal at the same time.

==== Women's doubles ====
(Chinese Taipei) Hsieh Su-wei / (China) Peng Shuai def. (Australia) Ashleigh Barty / (Australia) Casey Dellacqua, 7–6^{(7–1)}, 6–1

- It was their second title of the year and the first Grand Slam title for both players. It was Hsieh's 11th and Peng's 9th title in their careers.

==== Mixed doubles ====
(Canada) Daniel Nestor / (France) Kristina Mladenovic def. (Brazil) Bruno Soares / (United States) Lisa Raymond, 5–7, 6–2, 8–6

=== Juniors ===
==== Boys' singles ====
(Italy) Gianluigi Quinzi def. (South Korea) Chung Hyeon, 7–5, 7–6^{(7–2)}

==== Girls' singles ====
(Switzerland) Belinda Bencic def. (United States) Taylor Townsend, 4–6, 6–1, 6–4

==== Boys' doubles ====
(Australia) Thanasi Kokkinakis / (Australia) Nick Kyrgios def. (France) Enzo Couacaud / (Italy) Stefano Napolitano, 6–2, 6–3

==== Girls' doubles ====
(Czech Republic) Barbora Krejčíková / (Czech Republic) Kateřina Siniaková def. (Ukraine) Anhelina Kalinina / (Belarus) Iryna Shymanovich, 6–3, 6–1

=== Invitation ===
==== Gentlemen's invitation doubles ====
(Sweden) Thomas Enqvist / (Australia) Mark Philippoussis def. (United Kingdom) Greg Rusedski / (France) Fabrice Santoro, 7–6^{(8–6)}, 6–3

==== Ladies' invitation doubles ====
(United States) Lindsay Davenport / (Switzerland) Martina Hingis def. (Czech Republic) Jana Novotná / (Austria) Barbara Schett, 6–2, 6–2

==== Senior gentlemen's invitation doubles ====
(Australia) Pat Cash / (Australia) Mark Woodforde def. (United Kingdom) Jeremy Bates / (Sweden) Anders Järryd, 6–3, 6–3

=== Wheelchair ===
==== Wheelchair men's doubles ====
(France) Stéphane Houdet / (Japan) Shingo Kunieda def. (France) Frédéric Cattaneo / (Netherlands) Ronald Vink, 6–4, 6–2

==== Wheelchair women's doubles ====
(Netherlands) Jiske Griffioen / (Netherlands) Aniek van Koot def. (Japan) Yui Kamiji / (United Kingdom) Jordanne Whiley, 6–4, 7–6^{(8–6)}

== Singles seeds ==
The following are the seeded players and notable players who withdrew from the event. Seeds based on ATP and WTA rankings are as of 17 June 2013 and the rankings and points are as of 24 June 2013.

=== Men's singles ===
The Men's singles seeds is arranged on a surface-based system to reflect more accurately the individual player's grass court achievement as per the following formula, which applies to the top 32 players, according to ATP ranking on 17 June 2013:

- Take Entry System Position (ESP) points at 17 June 2013
- Add 100% points earned for all grass court tournaments in the past 12 months (18 June 2012 – 16 June 2013).
- Add 75% points earned for best grass court tournament in the 12 months before that (13 June 2011 – 17 June 2012)

Seed	Rank	Player	Points before	Points defending	Points won	Points after	Status
1	1	(Serbia) Novak Djokovic	11,830	720	1,200	12,310	Runner-up, lost to (United Kingdom) Andy Murray [2]
2	2	(United Kingdom) Andy Murray	8,560	1,200	2,000	9,360	Champion, defeated (Serbia) Novak Djokovic [1]
3	3	(Switzerland) Roger Federer	7,740	2,000	45	5,785	Second round lost to (Ukraine) Sergiy Stakhovsky
4	4	(Spain) David Ferrer	7,220	360	360	7,220	Quarterfinals lost to (Argentina) Juan Martín del Potro [8]
5	5	(Spain) Rafael Nadal	6,895	45	10	6,860	First round lost to (Belgium) Steve Darcis
6	7	(France) Jo-Wilfried Tsonga	4,155	720	45	3,480	Second round retired vs (Latvia) Ernests Gulbis
7	6	(Czech Republic) Tomáš Berdych	4,515	10	360	4,865	Quarterfinals lost to (Serbia) Novak Djokovic [1]
8	8	(Argentina) Juan Martín del Potro	3,960	180	720	4,500	Semifinals lost to (Serbia) Novak Djokovic [1]
9	9	(France) Richard Gasquet	3,135	180	90	3,045	Third round lost to (Australia) Bernard Tomic
10	12	(Croatia) Marin Čilić	2,470	180	45	2,335	Second round withdrew vs (France) Kenny de Schepper
11	10	(Switzerland) Stan Wawrinka	2,915	10	10	2,915	First round lost to (Australia) Lleyton Hewitt
12	11	(Japan) Kei Nishikori	2,495	90	90	2,495	Third round lost to (Italy) Andreas Seppi [23]
13	13	(Germany) Tommy Haas	2,425	0	180	2,605	Fourth round lost to (Serbia) Novak Djokovic [1]
14	14	(Serbia) Janko Tipsarević	2,390	90	10	2,310	First round lost to (Serbia) Viktor Troicki
15	16	(Spain) Nicolás Almagro	2,195	90	90	2,195	Third round lost to (Poland) Jerzy Janowicz [24]
16	18	(Germany) Philipp Kohlschreiber	1,885	360	10	1,535	First round retired against (Croatia) Ivan Dodig
17	15	(Canada) Milos Raonic	2,225	45	45	2,225	Second round lost to (Netherlands) Igor Sijsling
18	21	(United States) John Isner	1,735	10	45	1,770	Second round retired vs (France) Adrian Mannarino
19	17	(France) Gilles Simon	2,090	45	10	2,055	First round lost to (Spain) Feliciano López
20	26	(Russia) Mikhail Youzhny	1,415	360	180	1,235	Fourth round lost to (United Kingdom) Andy Murray [2]
21	19	(United States) Sam Querrey	1,810	90	10	1,730	First round lost to (Australia) Bernard Tomic
22	20	(Argentina) Juan Mónaco	1,740	90	90	1,740	Third round lost to (France) Kenny de Schepper
23	28	(Italy) Andreas Seppi	1,380	10	180	1,550	Fourth round lost to (Argentina) Juan Martín del Potro [8]
24	22	(Poland) Jerzy Janowicz	1,549	115	720	2,154	Semifinals lost to (United Kingdom) Andy Murray [2]
25	27	(France) Benoît Paire	1,380	90	90	1,380	Third round lost to (Poland) Łukasz Kubot
26	24	(Ukraine) Alexandr Dolgopolov	1,500	45	90	1,545	Third round lost to (Spain) David Ferrer [4]
27	23	(South Africa) Kevin Anderson	1,510	10	90	1,590	Third round lost to (Czech Republic) Tomáš Berdych [7]
28	25	(France) Jérémy Chardy	1,441	45	90	1,486	Third round lost to (Serbia) Novak Djokovic [1]
29	31	(Bulgaria) Grigor Dimitrov	1,330	45	45	1,330	Second round lost to (Slovenia) Grega Žemlja
30	30	(Italy) Fabio Fognini	1,345	45	10	1,310	First round lost to (Austria) Jürgen Melzer
31	33	(France) Julien Benneteau	1,200	90	45	1,155	Second round lost to (Spain) Fernando Verdasco
32	29	(Spain) Tommy Robredo	1,355	(80)^{†}	90	1,365	Third round lost to (United Kingdom) Andy Murray [2]

† The player did not qualify for the tournament in 2012. Accordingly, it is the defending points from the 2012 ATP Challenger Tour instead.

=== Women's singles ===
For the Women's singles seeds, the seeding order follows the ranking list, except where in the opinion of the committee, the grass court credentials of a particular player necessitates a change in the interest of achieving a balanced draw.

Seed	Rank	Player	Points before	Points defending	Points won	Points after	Status
1	1	(United States) Serena Williams	13,615	2,000	280	11,895	Fourth round lost to (Germany) Sabine Lisicki [23]
2	2	(Belarus) Victoria Azarenka	9,625	900	100	8,825	Second round withdrew due to knee injury
3	3	(Russia) Maria Sharapova	9,415	280	100	9,235	Second round lost to (Portugal) Michelle Larcher de Brito (Q)
4	4	(Poland) Agnieszka Radwańska	6,465	1,400	900	5,965	Semifinals lost to (Germany) Sabine Lisicki [23]
5	5	(Italy) Sara Errani	5,335	160	5	5,180	First round lost to (Puerto Rico) Monica Puig
6	6	(China) Li Na	5,155	100	500	5,555	Quarterfinals lost to (Poland) Agnieszka Radwańska [4]
7	7	(Germany) Angelique Kerber	4,770	900	100	3,970	Second round lost to (Estonia) Kaia Kanepi
8	8	(Czech Republic) Petra Kvitová	4,435	500	500	4,435	Quarterfinals lost to (Belgium) Kirsten Flipkens [20]
9	9	(Denmark) Caroline Wozniacki	3,565	5	100	3,660	Second round lost to (Czech Republic) Petra Cetkovská (Q)
10	10	(Russia) Maria Kirilenko	3,471	500	5	2,976	First round lost to (United Kingdom) Laura Robson
11	11	(Italy) Roberta Vinci	3,060	280	280	3,060	Fourth round lost to (China) Li Na [6]
12	12	(Serbia) Ana Ivanovic	2,920	280	100	2,740	Second round lost to (Canada) Eugenie Bouchard
13	13	(Russia) Nadia Petrova	2,660	160	5	2,505	First round lost to (Czech Republic) Karolína Plíšková
14	14	(Australia) Samantha Stosur	2,905	100	160	2,965	Third round lost to (Germany) Sabine Lisicki [23]
15	15	(France) Marion Bartoli	2,775	100	2,000	4,675	Champion, defeated (Germany) Sabine Lisicki [23]
16	16	(Serbia) Jelena Janković	2,830	5	100	2,925	Second round lost to (Serbia) Vesna Dolonc
17	17	(United States) Sloane Stephens	2,530	160	500	2,870	Quarterfinals lost to (France) Marion Bartoli [15]
18	19	(Slovakia) Dominika Cibulková	2,140	5	160	2,295	Third round lost to (Italy) Roberta Vinci [11]
19	18	(Spain) Carla Suárez Navarro	2,165	5	280	2,440	Fourth round lost to (Czech Republic) Petra Kvitová [8]
20	20	(Belgium) Kirsten Flipkens	2,038	(32)^{†}	900	2,906	Semifinals lost to (France) Marion Bartoli [15]
21	21	(Russia) Anastasia Pavlyuchenkova	1,900	100	5	1,805	First round lost to (Bulgaria) Tsvetana Pironkova
22	23	(Romania) Sorana Cîrstea	1,760	160	100	1,700	Second round lost to (Italy) Camila Giorgi
23	24	(Germany) Sabine Lisicki	1,750	500	1,400	2,650	Runner-up, lost to (France) Marion Bartoli [15]
24	26	(China) Peng Shuai	1,685	280	100	1,505	Second round lost to (New Zealand) Marina Erakovic
25	27	(Russia) Ekaterina Makarova	1,682	100	160	1,742	Third round lost to (Czech Republic) Petra Kvitová [8]
26	29	(United States) Varvara Lepchenko	1,566	160	5	1,411	First round lost to (Czech Republic) Eva Birnerová [Q]
27	30	(Czech Republic) Lucie Šafářová	1,560	5	100	1,655	Second round lost to (Italy) Karin Knapp
28	57	(Austria) Tamira Paszek	1,083	500	5	588	First round lost to (Romania) Alexandra Cadanțu
29	31	(France) Alizé Cornet	1,545	100	160	1,605	Third round lost to (Italy) Flavia Pennetta
30	33	(Germany) Mona Barthel	1,500	5	100	1,595	Second round lost to (United States) Madison Keys
31	34	(Switzerland) Romina Oprandi	1,490	100	5	1,395	First round retired against (United States) Alison Riske [WC]
32	43	(Czech Republic) Klára Zakopalová	1,300	160	160	1,300	Third round lost to (China) Li Na [6]

† The player did not qualify for the tournament in 2012. Accordingly, points for her 16th best result are deducted instead.

The following player would have been seeded, but she withdrew from the event.

Rank	Player	Points before	Points defending	Points after	Withdrawal reason
28	(Russia) Svetlana Kuznetsova	1,662	5	1,657	Abdominal strain

== Main draw wild card entries ==
The following players received wild cards into the main draw senior events.

=== Men's singles ===
- (Australia) Matthew Ebden
- (United Kingdom) Kyle Edmund
- (United States) Steve Johnson
- (France) Nicolas Mahut
- (United Kingdom) James Ward

=== Women's singles ===
- (United Kingdom) Elena Baltacha
- (Czech Republic) Lucie Hradecká
- (United Kingdom) Anne Keothavong
- (United Kingdom) Johanna Konta
- (United Kingdom) Tara Moore
- (United Kingdom) Samantha Murray
- (Germany) Andrea Petkovic
- (United States) Alison Riske

=== Men's doubles ===
- (United Kingdom) Jamie Baker / (United Kingdom) Kyle Edmund
- (Australia) Lleyton Hewitt / (The Bahamas) Mark Knowles
- (United Kingdom) David Rice / (United Kingdom) Sean Thornley

=== Women's doubles ===
- (United Kingdom) Anne Keothavong / (United Kingdom) Johanna Konta
- (United Kingdom) Tara Moore / (United Kingdom) Melanie South
- (United Kingdom) Samantha Murray / (United Kingdom) Jade Windley
- (Israel) Shahar Pe'er / (China) Yan Zi
- (United Kingdom) Nicola Slater / (United Kingdom) Lisa Whybourn

=== Mixed doubles ===
- (United States) James Blake / (Croatia) Donna Vekić
- (United Kingdom) Jamie Delgado / (United Kingdom) Tara Moore
- (United Kingdom) Kyle Edmund / (Canada) Eugenie Bouchard
- (United Kingdom) Dominic Inglot / (United Kingdom) Johanna Konta
- (The Bahamas) Mark Knowles / (Germany) Sabine Lisicki

== Qualifiers entries ==
Below are the lists of the qualifiers entering in the main draws.

=== Men's singles ===
Men's singles qualifiers

1. (France) Stéphane Robert
2. (Germany) Bastian Knittel
3. (Germany) Julian Reister
4. (United States) Wayne Odesnik
5. (Germany) Dustin Brown
6. (United States) Denis Kudla
7. (Germany) Jan-Lennard Struff
8. (Australia) Matt Reid
9. (Chinese Taipei) Jimmy Wang
10. (Australia) James Duckworth
11. (Poland) Michał Przysiężny
12. (United States) Bobby Reynolds
13. (Japan) Go Soeda
14. (United States) Alex Kuznetsov
15. (France) Marc Gicquel
16. (Russia) Teymuraz Gabashvili

Lucky losers

1. (Belgium) Olivier Rochus

=== Women's singles ===
Women's singles qualifiers

1. (Germany) Carina Witthöft
2. (Kazakhstan) Galina Voskoboeva
3. (France) Caroline Garcia
4. (Czech Republic) Petra Cetkovská
5. (Croatia) Ajla Tomljanović
6. (Italy) Maria Elena Camerin
7. (Austria) Yvonne Meusburger
8. (France) Virginie Razzano
9. (Czech Republic) Eva Birnerová
10. (Czech Republic) Barbora Záhlavová-Strýcová
11. (Colombia) Mariana Duque Mariño
12. (Portugal) Michelle Larcher de Brito

Lucky losers

1. (United States) Vania King
2. (Slovakia) Anna Karolína Schmiedlová

=== Men's doubles ===
Men's doubles qualifiers

1. (Canada) Jesse Levine / (Canada) Vasek Pospisil
2. (Australia) Sam Groth / (Australia) Chris Guccione
3. (Germany) Dominik Meffert / (Austria) Philipp Oswald
4. (India) Purav Raja / (India) Divij Sharan

Lucky losers

1. (Germany) Dustin Brown / (Australia) Rameez Junaid
2. (United States) Steve Johnson / (Sweden) Andreas Siljeström
3. (United States) Denis Kudla / (United States) Tim Smyczek

=== Women's doubles ===
Women's doubles qualifiers

1. (France) Stéphanie Foretz Gacon / (Czech Republic) Eva Hrdinová
2. (Argentina) María Irigoyen / (Argentina) Paula Ormaechea
3. (Romania) Raluca Olaru / (Ukraine) Olga Savchuk
4. (Russia) Valeriya Solovyeva / (Ukraine) Maryna Zanevska

== Protected ranking ==
The following players were accepted directly into the main draw using a protected ranking:

Men's Singles

- (Russia) Igor Andreev (PR 108)
- (Estonia) Jürgen Zopp (PR 88)

Women's Singles

- (Netherlands) Michaëlla Krajicek (PR 105)

== Withdrawals ==
The following players were accepted directly into the main tournament, but withdrew with injuries or personal reasons.

Before the tournament

Men's singles

- (United States) Brian Baker → replaced by (Belgium) Steve Darcis
- (Brazil) Thomaz Bellucci → replaced by (Belgium) Olivier Rochus
- (Russia) Nikolay Davydenko → replaced by (France) Guillaume Rufin
- (United States) Mardy Fish → replaced by (Portugal) Gastão Elias
- (Luxembourg) Gilles Müller → replaced by (Austria) Andreas Haider-Maurer

Women's singles

- (Chinese Taipei) Chan Yung-jan → replaced by (United States) Alexa Glatch
- (China) Duan Yingying → replaced by (Croatia) Petra Martić
- (Russia) Svetlana Kuznetsova → replaced by (Slovakia) Anna Karolína Schmiedlová
- (United States) Venus Williams → replaced by (United States) Vania King
- (Canada) Aleksandra Wozniak → replaced by (Kazakhstan) Yulia Putintseva

During the tournament

Men's Singles

- (Croatia) Marin Čilić
- (Belgium) Steve Darcis

Women's Singles

- (Belarus) Victoria Azarenka
- (Kazakhstan) Yaroslava Shvedova

== Retirements ==
Men's Singles

- (United States) John Isner
- (Germany) Philipp Kohlschreiber
- (France) Michaël Llodra
- (France) Paul-Henri Mathieu
- (Argentina) Guido Pella
- (Netherlands) Igor Sijsling
- (Czech Republic) Radek Štěpánek
- (France) Jo-Wilfried Tsonga

Women's singles

- (Switzerland) Romina Oprandi

== Media coverage ==
Country	TV broadcaster(s)	Notes
Australia	Seven Network	
Brazil	SporTV	
Croatia	HRT, Sport Klub	
France	Canal+	
Hungary	Digi Sport 1, Fox Sports Australia	
India	Star Sports 2, ESPN	
Indonesia	Star Sports, Fox Sports	
Ireland	TG4	
Israel	Sport 5	
Pakistan	PTV Sports	
Poland	Polsat Sport	
Romania	Digi Sport 2, Digi Sport 3	
Serbia	B92, Sport Klub	
South Africa	SuperSport	
UAE & Middle East	Abu Dhabi Sports	
United Kingdom	BBC	
United States	ESPN	

Preceded by 2013 French Open	Grand Slam tournaments	Succeeded by 2013 US Open
