= 2013 Wimbledon Championships – Men's singles =

Men's singles
- 2013 Wimbledon Championships

Final
- Champion: (United Kingdom) Andy Murray
- Runner-up: (Serbia) Novak Djokovic
- Score: 6–4, 7–5, 6–4

Details
- Draw: 128 (16Q / 5WC)
- Seeds: 32

Events
Singles	men	women		boys	girls
Doubles	men	women	mixed	boys	girls
WC Singles	men	women	quad
WC Doubles	men	women	quad
Legends	men	women	seniors
- Wimbledon Championships

Andy Murray defeated Novak Djokovic in the final, 6–4, 7–5, 6–4 to win the gentlemen's singles tennis title at the 2013 Wimbledon Championships. It was his first Wimbledon title and second major title overall. Murray was the first Briton to win the title since Fred Perry in 1936, ending a 76-year drought, (Note: Although commonly reported as a 77-year drought – as there are 77 years between Perry's 1936 win and Murray's 2013 win – Perry reigned as the Wimbledon men's singles champion until the 1937 Championships.) as well as the first British winner in singles since Virginia Wade won the women's event in 1977. He was also the first Scot to win the title since Harold Mahony in 1896.

Roger Federer was the defending champion, but lost in the second round to No.116-ranked Sergiy Stakhovsky. Federer's loss marked the first time since the 2004 French Open that he failed to reach the quarterfinals at a major, ending a streak of 36 consecutive quarterfinals at majors. It was his earliest exit in Wimbledon since 2002, and the first time he lost to a player ranked outside the top 100 since 2005.

Djokovic advanced to the final after a five-set semifinal against Juan Martín del Potro. At 4 hours and 43 minutes, this match was the longest semifinal ever contested at Wimbledon at the time, breaking the previous record of 4 hours 1 minute set by Boris Becker and Ivan Lendl in 1989. This would be surpassed in 2018, when Djokovic defeated Rafael Nadal in the semifinals lasting 5 hours and 15 minutes, while Kevin Anderson defeated John Isner in 6 hours and 36 minutes in the other semifinal match.

In the first round, No. 135-ranked Steve Darcis defeated world No. 5 and two-time Wimbledon champion Rafael Nadal, ending Nadal's streak of winning his first round matches in his first 34 major tournaments. Federer and Nadal's early exits made this the first time since 2002 that neither of them contested the Wimbledon final. For the first time since 1912, no Americans advanced past the second round. For the first time, a Polish man reached a major semifinal after Jerzy Janowicz defeated compatriot Łukasz Kubot in the quarterfinals.

== Seeds ==
1. (Serbia) Novak Djokovic (final)
2. (United Kingdom) Andy Murray (champion)
3. (Switzerland) Roger Federer (second round)
4. (Spain) David Ferrer (quarterfinals)
5. (Spain) Rafael Nadal (first round)
6. (France) Jo-Wilfried Tsonga (second round, retired with a left knee injury)
7. (Czech Republic) Tomáš Berdych (quarterfinals)
8. (Argentina) Juan Martín del Potro (semifinals)
9. (France) Richard Gasquet (third round)
10. (Croatia) Marin Čilić (second round, withdrew)
11. (Switzerland) Stan Wawrinka (first round)
12. (Japan) Kei Nishikori (third round)
13. (Germany) Tommy Haas (fourth round)
14. (Serbia) Janko Tipsarević (first round)
15. (Spain) Nicolás Almagro (third round)
16. (Germany) Philipp Kohlschreiber (first round, retired with fatigue)

17. (Canada) Milos Raonic (second round)
18. (United States) John Isner (second round, retired with a left knee injury)
19. (France) Gilles Simon (first round)
20. (Russia) Mikhail Youzhny (fourth round)
21. (United States) Sam Querrey (first round)
22. (Argentina) Juan Mónaco (third round)
23. (Italy) Andreas Seppi (fourth round)
24. (Poland) Jerzy Janowicz (semifinals)
25. (France) Benoît Paire (third round)
26. (Ukraine) Alexandr Dolgopolov (third round)
27. (South Africa) Kevin Anderson (third round)
28. (France) Jérémy Chardy (third round)
29. (Bulgaria) Grigor Dimitrov (second round)
30. (Italy) Fabio Fognini (first round)
31. (France) Julien Benneteau (second round)
32. (Spain) Tommy Robredo (third round)

Click on the seed number of a player to go to their draw section.

== Draw ==
Key

- Q = Qualifier
- WC = Wild card
- LL = Lucky loser
- Alt = Alternate
- ITF = ITF entry
- PR = Protected ranking
- SR = Special ranking
- SE = Special exempt
- JE = Junior exempt
- JR = Junior Accelerator Programme entrant
- CO = College Accelerator Programme entrant
- NG = Next Gen Accelerator Program entrant
- w/o = Walkover
- r = Retired
- d = Defaulted

=== Finals ===
Quarterfinals
1	(Serbia) Novak Djokovic	7^{7}	6	6
7	(Czech Republic) Tomáš Berdych	6^{5}	4	3
4	(Spain) David Ferrer	2	4	6^{5}
8	(Argentina) Juan Martín del Potro	6	6	7^{7}
(Poland) Łukasz Kubot	5	4	4
24	(Poland) Jerzy Janowicz	7	6	6
(Spain) Fernando Verdasco	6	6	1	4	5
2	(United Kingdom) Andy Murray	4	3	6	6	7

Semifinals
1	(Serbia) Novak Djokovic	7	4	7^{7}	6^{6}	6
8	(Argentina) Juan Martín del Potro	5	6	6^{2}	7^{8}	3
24	(Poland) Jerzy Janowicz	7^{7}	4	4	3
2	(United Kingdom) Andy Murray	6^{2}	6	6	6

Final
1	(Serbia) Novak Djokovic	4	5	4
2	(United Kingdom) Andy Murray	6	7	6

=== Top half ===
==== Section 1 ====
First round
1	(Serbia) N Djokovic	6	7	6
(Germany) F Mayer	3	5	4
Q	(United States) B Reynolds	1	7^{7}	6	6^{4}	6
WC	(United States) S Johnson	6	6^{4}	3	7^{7}	4
(Slovenia) B Kavčič	4	1	3
Q	(Germany) J-L Struff	6	6	6
(United States) R Harrison	6^{4}	6	5	2
28	(France) J Chardy	7^{7}	4	7	6
19	(France) G Simon	2	4	6^{11}
(Spain) F López	6	6	7^{13}
(Lithuania) R Berankis	6^{4}	5	7^{7}	4
(France) P-H Mathieu	7^{7}	7	6^{3}	6
Q	(United States) W Odesnik	6^{5}	6	2	6	5
Q	(Chinese Taipei) J Wang	7^{7}	4	6	3	7
(Russia) D Tursunov	3	5	5
13	(Germany) T Haas	6	7	7

Second round
1	(Serbia) N Djokovic	7^{7}	6	6
Q	(United States) B Reynolds	6^{2}	3	1
Q	(Germany) J-L Struff	2	7	6^{6}	6^{4}
28	(France) J Chardy	6	5	7^{8}	7^{7}
(Spain) F López	6	5
(France) P-H Mathieu	3	1^{r}
Q	(Chinese Taipei) J Wang	3	2	5
13	(Germany) T Haas	6	6	7

Third round
1	(Serbia) N Djokovic	6	6	6
28	(France) J Chardy	3	2	2
(Spain) F López	6	2	5	4
13	(Germany) T Haas	4	6	7	6

Fourth round
1	(Serbia) N Djokovic	6	6	7^{7}
13	(Germany) T Haas	1	4	6^{4}

==== Section 2 ====
First round
9	(France) R Gasquet	6^{2}	6	7	6
(Spain) M Granollers	7^{7}	4	5	4
(Austria) A Haider-Maurer	6^{6}	5	1
Q	(Japan) G Soeda	7^{8}	7	6
(United States) J Blake	6	6	6
(Netherlands) T de Bakker	1	3	2
(Australia) B Tomic	7^{8}	7^{7}	3	2	6
21	(United States) S Querrey	6^{6}	6^{3}	6	6	3
27	(South Africa) K Anderson	6	6	6
LL	(Belgium) O Rochus	4	2	1
(Germany) P Petzschner	3	6^{6}	0
Q	(Poland) M Przysiężny	6	7^{8}	6
(Germany) D Brands	7^{7}	6^{4}	6^{5}	6	6
(Spain) D Gimeno Traver	6^{5}	7^{7}	7^{7}	1	4
(Slovakia) M Kližan	3	4	4
7	(Czech Republic) T Berdych	6	6	6

Second round
9	(France) R Gasquet	6	6	6^{5}	6
Q	(Japan) G Soeda	0	3	7^{7}	3
(United States) J Blake	3	4	5
(Australia) B Tomic	6	6	7
27	(South Africa) K Anderson	6	7^{7}	6
Q	(Poland) M Przysiężny	4	6^{2}	4
(Germany) D Brands	6^{6}	4	2
7	(Czech Republic) T Berdych	7^{8}	6	6

Third round
9	(France) R Gasquet	6^{7}	7	5	6^{5}
(Australia) B Tomic	7^{9}	5	7	7^{7}
27	(South Africa) K Anderson	6	3	4	5
7	(Czech Republic) T Berdych	3	6	6	7

Fourth round
(Australia) B Tomic	6^{4}	7^{7}	4	4
7	(Czech Republic) T Berdych	7^{7}	6^{5}	6	6

==== Section 3 ====
First round
4	(Spain) D Ferrer	6	4	7	6
(Argentina) M Alund	1	6	5	2
(Spain) R Bautista Agut	6	6	7^{7}
Q	(Russia) T Gabashvili	3	4	6^{3}
(Argentina) H Zeballos	6	6^{4}	7^{8}	1	3
(Colombia) S Giraldo	3	7^{7}	6^{6}	6	6
(Portugal) G Elias	1	6^{2}	2
26	(Ukraine) A Dolgopolov	6	7^{7}	6
17	(Canada) M Raonic	6	6	6
(Argentina) C Berlocq	4	3	3
Q	(United States) Al Kuznetsov	3	4	4
(Netherlands) I Sijsling	6	6	6
Q	(Australia) J Duckworth	4	2	6	6	1
Q	(United States) D Kudla	6	6	3	4	6
(Croatia) I Dodig	4	6^{6}	7^{7}	6	2
16	(Germany) P Kohlschreiber	6	7^{8}	6^{3}	3	1^{r}

Second round
4	(Spain) D Ferrer	6	3	7^{7}	7
(Spain) R Bautista Agut	3	6	6^{4}	5
(Colombia) S Giraldo	4	5	3
26	(Ukraine) A Dolgopolov	6	7	6
17	(Canada) M Raonic	5	4	6^{4}
(Netherlands) I Sijsling	7	6	7^{7}
Q	(United States) D Kudla	1	6^{4}	5
(Croatia) I Dodig	6	7^{7}	7

Third round
4	(Spain) D Ferrer	6^{6}	7^{7}	2	6	6
26	(Ukraine) A Dolgopolov	7^{8}	6^{2}	6	1	2
(Netherlands) I Sijsling	0	1	0^{r}
(Croatia) I Dodig	6	6	1

Fourth round
4	(Spain) D Ferrer	6^{3}	7^{8}	6	6
(Croatia) I Dodig	7^{7}	6^{6}	1	1

==== Section 4 ====
First round
12	(Japan) K Nishikori	6	6	6
WC	(Australia) M Ebden	2	4	3
(Argentina) L Mayer	6	6	6
(Slovenia) A Bedene	2	3	4
(France) M Llodra	7^{7}	6	6
(Finland) J Nieminen	6^{3}	4	3
(Uzbekistan) D Istomin	6^{6}	6^{3}	7	6	3
23	(Italy) A Seppi	7^{8}	7^{7}	5	3	6
29	(Bulgaria) G Dimitrov	6	6	6
(Italy) S Bolelli	1	4	3
(Slovenia) G Žemlja	6^{3}	6	6	6
(United States) M Russell	7^{7}	4	4	1
(Argentina) G Pella	4	2	6	6	3^{r}
(Canada) J Levine	6	6	4	3	4
(Spain) A Ramos Viñolas	2	5	1
8	(Argentina) JM del Potro	6	7	6

Second round
12	(Japan) K Nishikori	7^{7}	6	6
(Argentina) L Mayer	6^{5}	4	2
(France) M Llodra	5	0^{r}
23	(Italy) A Seppi	7	0
29	(Bulgaria) G Dimitrov	6	6^{4}	6	4	9
(Slovenia) G Žemlja	3	7^{7}	3	6	11
(Canada) J Levine	2	6^{7}	3
8	(Argentina) JM del Potro	6	7^{9}	6

Third round
12	(Japan) K Nishikori	6	2	7^{7}	1	4
23	(Italy) A Seppi	3	6	6^{4}	6	6
(Slovenia) G Žemlja	5	6^{3}	0
8	(Argentina) JM del Potro	7	7^{7}	6

Fourth round
23	(Italy) A Seppi	4	6^{2}	3
8	(Argentina) JM del Potro	6	7^{7}	6

=== Bottom half ===
==== Section 5 ====
First round
5	(Spain) R Nadal	6^{4}	6^{8}	4
(Belgium) S Darcis	7^{7}	7^{10}	6
(Poland) Ł Kubot	6	7	6
PR	(Russia) I Andreev	1	5	2
Q	(France) S Robert	6	7^{7}	7
(Colombia) A Falla	3	6^{5}	5
(Romania) A Ungur	4	6	3	1
25	(France) B Paire	6	4	6	6
18	(United States) J Isner	6	7^{7}	7^{7}
(Russia) E Donskoy	1	6^{5}	6^{3}
(Spain) P Andújar	1	2	3
(France) A Mannarino	6	6	6
Q	(Germany) D Brown	6	6	6
(Spain) G García López	3	3	3
(Australia) L Hewitt	6	7	6
11	(Switzerland) S Wawrinka	4	5	3

Second round
(Belgium) S Darcis	w/o
(Poland) Ł Kubot
Q	(France) S Robert	4	5	4
25	(France) B Paire	6	7	6
18	(United States) J Isner	1^{r}
(France) A Mannarino	1
Q	(Germany) D Brown	6	6	6^{3}	6
(Australia) L Hewitt	4	4	7^{7}	2

Third round
(Poland) Ł Kubot	6	6	6
25	(France) B Paire	1	3	4
(France) A Mannarino	6	6	7
Q	(Germany) D Brown	4	2	5

Fourth round
(Poland) Ł Kubot	4	6	3	6	6
(France) A Mannarino	6	3	6	3	4

==== Section 6 ====
First round
15	(Spain) N Almagro	6	7^{7}	7
PR	(Estonia) J Zopp	4	6^{2}	5
(Australia) M Matosevic	1	6	4	3
(France) G Rufin	6	4	6	6
(Czech Republic) R Štěpánek	6	6	6
Q	(Australia) M Reid	2	2	4
WC	(United Kingdom) K Edmund	2	2	4
24	(Poland) J Janowicz	6	6	6
30	(Italy) F Fognini	7^{7}	5	3	2
(Austria) J Melzer	6^{5}	7	6	6
Q	(Germany) J Reister	6	4	7^{7}	6^{4}	6
(Czech Republic) L Rosol	3	6	6^{5}	7^{7}	4
(Brazil) R Dutra Silva	4	0	4
(Ukraine) S Stakhovsky	6	6	6
(Romania) V Hănescu	3	2	0
3	(Switzerland) R Federer	6	6	6

Second round
15	(Spain) N Almagro	7	6^{6}	6	6
(France) G Rufin	5	7^{8}	3	4
(Czech Republic) R Štěpánek	2	3^{r}
24	(Poland) J Janowicz	6	5
(Austria) J Melzer	3	7^{7}	7^{7}	6
Q	(Germany) J Reister	6	6^{2}	6^{5}	2
(Ukraine) S Stakhovsky	6^{5}	7^{7}	7	7^{7}
3	(Switzerland) R Federer	7^{7}	6^{5}	5	6^{5}

Third round
15	(Spain) N Almagro	6^{6}	3	4
24	(Poland) J Janowicz	7^{8}	6	6
(Austria) J Melzer	6	2	7	6
(Ukraine) S Stakhovsky	2	6	5	3

Fourth round
24	(Poland) J Janowicz	3	7^{7}	6	4	6
(Austria) J Melzer	6	6^{1}	4	6	4

==== Section 7 ====
First round
6	(France) J-W Tsonga	7^{7}	6	6
(Belgium) D Goffin	6^{4}	4	3
(France) É Roger-Vasselin	6^{1}	4	5
(Latvia) E Gulbis	7^{7}	6	7
(Spain) F Verdasco	6^{5}	6	6	6
(Belgium) X Malisse	7^{7}	1	4	3
(Germany) T Kamke	4	7^{7}	4	2
31	(France) J Benneteau	6	6^{5}	6	6
22	(Argentina) J Mónaco	6	6	6
Q	(Germany) B Knittel	4	2	3
(Slovakia) L Lacko	5	4	7^{7}	2
(United States) R Ram	7	6	6^{2}	6
(France) K de Schepper	7^{8}	6	6
(Italy) P Lorenzi	6^{6}	4	2
(Cyprus) M Baghdatis	3	4	4
10	(Croatia) M Čilić	6	6	6

Second round
6	(France) J-W Tsonga	6	3	3	0^{r}
(Latvia) E Gulbis	3	6	6	0
(Spain) F Verdasco	7^{7}	7^{7}	6
31	(France) J Benneteau	6^{1}	6^{4}	4
22	(Argentina) J Mónaco	5	6	6	6
(United States) R Ram	7	2	4	2
(France) K de Schepper
10	(Croatia) M Čilić	w/o

Third round
(Latvia) E Gulbis	2	4	4
(Spain) F Verdasco	6	6	6
22	(Argentina) J Mónaco	4	6^{8}	4
(France) K de Schepper	6	7^{10}	6

Fourth round
(Spain) F Verdasco	6	6	6
(France) K de Schepper	4	4	4

==== Section 8 ====
First round
14	(Serbia) J Tipsarević	3	4	6^{5}
(Serbia) V Troicki	6	6	7^{7}
(Russia) An Kuznetsov	6	6	3	6
(Spain) A Montañés	3	4	6	3
Q	(France) M Gicquel	3	2	6^{3}
(Canada) V Pospisil	6	6	7^{7}
(Netherlands) R Haase	4	5	5
20	(Russia) M Youzhny	6	7	7
32	(Spain) T Robredo	6	6	6
(Russia) A Bogomolov Jr.	2	2	4
WC	(France) N Mahut	6	6	6
(Czech Republic) J Hájek	2	4	3
WC	(United Kingdom) J Ward	7^{7}	4	6^{11}	6^{4}
(Chinese Taipei) Y-h Lu	6^{4}	6	7^{13}	7^{7}
(Germany) B Becker	4	3	2
2	(United Kingdom) A Murray	6	6	6

Second round
(Serbia) V Troicki	6	6	6
(Russia) An Kuznetsov	4	3	4
(Canada) V Pospisil	2	7^{7}	6^{7}	6	4
20	(Russia) M Youzhny	6	6^{3}	7^{9}	3	6
32	(Spain) T Robredo	7^{7}	6	7^{7}
WC	(France) N Mahut	6^{3}	1	6^{5}
(Chinese Taipei) Y-h Lu	3	3	5
2	(United Kingdom) A Murray	6	6	7

Third round
(Serbia) V Troicki	3	4	5
20	(Russia) M Youzhny	6	6	7
32	(Spain) T Robredo	2	4	5
2	(United Kingdom) A Murray	6	6	7

Fourth round
20	(Russia) M Youzhny	4	6^{5}	1
2	(United Kingdom) A Murray	6	7^{7}	6

== Annotations ==
Preceded by 2013 French Open – Men's singles	Grand Slam men's singles	Succeeded by 2013 US Open – Men's singles
