= 2013 Wimbledon Championships – Women's singles =

Women's singles
- 2013 Wimbledon Championships

Final
- Champion: (France) Marion Bartoli
- Runner-up: (Germany) Sabine Lisicki
- Score: 6–1, 6–4

Details
- Draw: 128 (12Q / 8WC)
- Seeds: 32

Events
Singles	men	women		boys	girls
Doubles	men	women	mixed	boys	girls
WC Singles	men	women	quad
WC Doubles	men	women	quad
Legends	men	women	seniors
- Wimbledon Championships

Marion Bartoli defeated Sabine Lisicki in the final, 6–1, 6–4 to win the ladies' singles tennis title at the 2013 Wimbledon Championships. It was her first and only major title. Bartoli did not lose a set during the tournament, or face a tiebreak in any set. She was the first French major champion since Amélie Mauresmo at the 2006 Wimbledon Championships. By winning her first major title on her 47th appearance, she broke the previous women's record of 45, set by Jana Novotná in 1998, for the most appearances in majors before winning a title. Bartoli and Novotna happen to share a birthday, both were born on the 2nd of October, in 1984 and 1968, respectively. This was also Bartoli's last major appearance, as she retired from professional tennis the following month. This made her the first woman to win a major on her last appearance since Ann Jones won the 1969 Wimbledon Championships.

Serena Williams was the defending champion, but lost to Lisicki in the fourth round, ending a 34-match winning streak dating back to the Miami Open. This was the fourth consecutive occasion where Lisicki defeated the reigning French Open champion at Wimbledon, following victories over Svetlana Kuznetsova in 2009, Li Na in 2011, and Maria Sharapova in 2012 (Lisicki did not play at Wimbledon in 2010).

The exits of Li Na and Petra Kvitová in the quarterfinals ensured a first-time major champion. Lisicki was the first German woman to contest a major final since Steffi Graf at the 1999 Wimbledon Championships, while Bartoli was the first Frenchwoman to contest a major final since herself in 2007. The final marked the second time in the Open Era, after 1998, that neither Wimbledon finalist had won a major before.

== Seeds ==
1. (United States) Serena Williams (fourth round)
2. (Belarus) Victoria Azarenka (second round, withdrew)
3. (Russia) Maria Sharapova (second round)
4. (Poland) Agnieszka Radwańska (semifinals)
5. (Italy) Sara Errani (first round)
6. (China) Li Na (quarterfinals)
7. (Germany) Angelique Kerber (second round)
8. (Czech Republic) Petra Kvitová (quarterfinals)
9. (Denmark) Caroline Wozniacki (second round)
10. (Russia) Maria Kirilenko (first round)
11. (Italy) Roberta Vinci (fourth round)
12. (Serbia) Ana Ivanovic (second round)
13. (Russia) Nadia Petrova (first round)
14. (Australia) Samantha Stosur (third round)
15. (France) Marion Bartoli (champion)
16. (Serbia) Jelena Janković (second round)

17. (United States) Sloane Stephens (quarterfinals)
18. (Slovakia) Dominika Cibulková (third round)
19. (Spain) Carla Suárez Navarro (fourth round)
20. (Belgium) Kirsten Flipkens (semifinals)
21. (Russia) Anastasia Pavlyuchenkova (first round)
22. (Romania) Sorana Cîrstea (second round)
23. (Germany) Sabine Lisicki (final)
24. (China) Peng Shuai (second round)
25. (Russia) Ekaterina Makarova (third round)
26. (United States) Varvara Lepchenko (first round)
27. (Czech Republic) Lucie Šafářová (second round)
28. (Austria) Tamira Paszek (first round)
29. (France) Alizé Cornet (third round)
30. (Germany) Mona Barthel (second round)
31. (Switzerland) Romina Oprandi (first round, retired)
32. (Czech Republic) Klára Zakopalová (third round)

Click on the seed number of a player to go to their draw section.

== Draw ==
Key

- Q = Qualifier
- WC = Wild card
- LL = Lucky loser
- Alt = Alternate
- ITF = ITF entry
- PR = Protected ranking
- SR = Special ranking
- SE = Special exempt
- JE = Junior exempt
- JR = Junior Accelerator Programme entrant
- CO = College Accelerator Programme entrant
- NG = Next Gen Accelerator Program entrant
- w/o = Walkover
- r = Retired
- d = Defaulted

=== Finals ===
Quarterfinals
23	(Germany) Sabine Lisicki	6	6
(Estonia) Kaia Kanepi	3	3
4	(Poland) Agnieszka Radwańska	7^{7}	4	6
6	(China) Li Na	6^{5}	6	2
17	(United States) Sloane Stephens	4	5
15	(France) Marion Bartoli	6	7
8	(Czech Republic) Petra Kvitová	6	3	4
20	(Belgium) Kirsten Flipkens	4	6	6

Semifinals
23	(Germany) Sabine Lisicki	6	2	9
4	(Poland) Agnieszka Radwańska	4	6	7
15	(France) Marion Bartoli	6	6
20	(Belgium) Kirsten Flipkens	1	2

Final
23	(Germany) Sabine Lisicki	1	4
15	(France) Marion Bartoli	6	6

=== Top half ===
==== Section 1 ====
First round
1	(United States) S Williams	6	6
(Luxembourg) M Minella	1	3
Q	(France) C Garcia	6	6
(China) J Zheng	3	4
(Japan) K Date-Krumm	6	6
Q	(Germany) C Witthöft	0	2
(Romania) A Cadanțu	6	7
28	(Austria) T Paszek	2	5
23	(Germany) S Lisicki	6	6
(Italy) F Schiavone	1	2
(Russia) E Vesnina	6	7
(Czech Republic) A Hlaváčková	2	5
(Russia) O Puchkova	6	6
(Netherlands) A Rus	4	2
LL	(Slovakia) AK Schmiedlová	1	3
14	(Australia) S Stosur	6	6

Second round
1	(United States) S Williams	6	6
Q	(France) C Garcia	3	2
(Japan) K Date-Krumm	6	7
(Romania) A Cadanțu	4	5
23	(Germany) S Lisicki	6	6
(Russia) E Vesnina	3	1
(Russia) O Puchkova	2	2
14	(Australia) S Stosur	6	6

Third round
1	(United States) S Williams	6	6
(Japan) K Date-Krumm	2	0
23	(Germany) S Lisicki	4	6	6
14	(Australia) S Stosur	6	2	1

Fourth round
1	(United States) S Williams	2	6	4
23	(Germany) S Lisicki	6	1	6

==== Section 2 ====
First round
10	(Russia) M Kirilenko	3	4
(United Kingdom) L Robson	6	6
Q	(Colombia) M Duque Mariño	6	6^{3}	7
(Germany) J Görges	4	7^{7}	5
(Japan) A Morita	6	0	5
(New Zealand) M Erakovic	4	6	7
(Spain) A Medina Garrigues	3	2
24	(China) S Peng	6	6
31	(Switzerland) R Oprandi	7^{7}	5	1^{r}
WC	(United States) A Riske	6^{5}	7	3
(United States) M Burdette	6^{3}	6	2
(Poland) U Radwańska	7^{7}	4	6
(Estonia) K Kanepi	7	5	7
WC	(United Kingdom) T Moore	5	7	5
(United States) B Mattek-Sands	3	4
7	(Germany) A Kerber	6	6

Second round
(United Kingdom) L Robson	6	6
Q	(Colombia) M Duque Mariño	4	1
(New Zealand) M Erakovic	7^{8}	6
24	(China) S Peng	6^{6}	2
WC	(United States) A Riske	4	6	6
(Poland) U Radwańska	6	3	4
(Estonia) K Kanepi	3	7^{8}	6
7	(Germany) A Kerber	6	6^{6}	3

Third round
(United Kingdom) L Robson	1	7	6
(New Zealand) M Erakovic	6	5	3
WC	(United States) A Riske	2	3
(Estonia) K Kanepi	6	6

Fourth round
(United Kingdom) L Robson	6^{6}	5
(Estonia) K Kanepi	7^{8}	7

==== Section 3 ====
First round
4	(Poland) A Radwańska	6	6
Q	(Austria) Y Meusburger	1	1
(Hungary) T Babos	6	1	3
(France) M Johansson	4	6	6
(United Kingdom) H Watson	3	5
(United States) M Keys	6	7
(Romania) M Niculescu	3	6	5
30	(Germany) M Barthel	6	4	7
21	(Russia) A Pavlyuchenkova	0	1
(Bulgaria) T Pironkova	6	6
Q	(Czech Republic) B Záhlavová-Strýcová	5	6	6
(Slovakia) M Rybáriková	7	0	1
(Georgia (country)) A Tatishvili	1	6	3
(Croatia) P Martić	6	1	6
(Czech Republic) Ka Plíšková	6	6
13	(Russia) N Petrova	3	2

Second round
4	(Poland) A Radwańska	6	6
(France) M Johansson	1	3
(United States) M Keys	6	6
30	(Germany) M Barthel	4	2
(Bulgaria) T Pironkova	7	6
Q	(Czech Republic) B Záhlavová-Strýcová	5	3
(Croatia) P Martić	7^{9}	6
(Czech Republic) Ka Plíšková	6^{7}	1

Third round
4	(Poland) A Radwańska	7	4	6
(United States) M Keys	5	6	3
(Bulgaria) T Pironkova	6	4	6
(Croatia) P Martić	1	6	2

Fourth round
4	(Poland) A Radwańska	4	6	6
(Bulgaria) T Pironkova	6	3	3

==== Section 4 ====
First round
11	(Italy) R Vinci	6	6
(South Africa) C Scheepers	2	1
(Czech Republic) Kr Plíšková	4	1
(Slovakia) J Čepelová	6	6
(Spain) MT Torró Flor	6	6
(Romania) I-C Begu	3	4
Q	(Italy) ME Camerin	4	6	4
18	(Slovakia) D Cibulková	6	4	6
32	(Czech Republic) K Zakopalová	6	6
(Slovakia) D Hantuchová	4	3
(Russia) N Bratchikova	3	2
(Germany) A Beck	6	6
(Belarus) O Govortsova	2	6	3
(Romania) S Halep	6	3	6
PR	(Netherlands) M Krajicek	1	1
6	(China) N Li	6	6

Second round
11	(Italy) R Vinci	6	4	9
(Slovakia) J Čepelová	1	6	7
(Spain) MT Torró Flor	0	1
18	(Slovakia) D Cibulková	6	6
32	(Czech Republic) K Zakopalová	7^{7}	6
(Germany) A Beck	6^{5}	3
(Romania) S Halep	2	6	0
6	(China) N Li	6	1	6

Third round
11	(Italy) R Vinci	6	6
18	(Slovakia) D Cibulková	1	4
32	(Czech Republic) K Zakopalová	6	0	6
6	(China) N Li	4	6	8

Fourth round
11	(Italy) R Vinci	2	0
6	(China) N Li	6	6

=== Bottom half ===
==== Section 5 ====
First round
5	(Italy) S Errani	3	2
(Puerto Rico) M Puig	6	6
(Spain) S Soler Espinosa	1	6	6
(Japan) M Doi	6	4	1
(Spain) L Arruabarrena	1	3
(Ukraine) L Tsurenko	6	6
Q	(Czech Republic) E Birnerová	6	4	6
26	(United States) V Lepchenko	2	6	4
17	(United States) S Stephens	6	6
(United States) J Hampton	3	3
(France) P Parmentier	3	2
WC	(Germany) A Petkovic	6	6
Q	(Czech Republic) P Cetkovská	6	6
(Croatia) D Vekić	3	1
(Spain) E Cabeza Candela	0	2
9	(Denmark) C Wozniacki	6	6

Second round
(Puerto Rico) M Puig	6	5	6
(Spain) S Soler Espinosa	2	7	4
(Ukraine) L Tsurenko	3	4
Q	(Czech Republic) E Birnerová	6	6
17	(United States) S Stephens	7^{7}	2	8
WC	(Germany) A Petkovic	6^{2}	6	6
Q	(Czech Republic) P Cetkovská	6	6
9	(Denmark) C Wozniacki	2	2

Third round
(Puerto Rico) M Puig	4	6	6
Q	(Czech Republic) E Birnerová	6	3	4
17	(United States) S Stephens	7^{7}	0	6
Q	(Czech Republic) P Cetkovská	6^{3}	6	4

Fourth round
(Puerto Rico) M Puig	6	5	1
17	(United States) S Stephens	4	7	6

==== Section 6 ====
First round
15	(France) M Bartoli	6	7
(Ukraine) E Svitolina	3	5
(United States) C McHale	6	6
(United States) A Glatch	4	4
(Italy) C Giorgi	6	6
WC	(United Kingdom) S Murray	3	4
(Switzerland) S Vögele	5	6^{3}
22	(Romania) S Cîrstea	7	7^{7}
27	(Czech Republic) L Šafářová	6	6
(United States) L Davis	4	0
WC	(Czech Republic) L Hradecká	3	4
(Italy) K Knapp	6	6
Q	(Portugal) M Larcher de Brito	7^{9}	1	6
(United States) M Oudin	6^{7}	6	4
(France) K Mladenovic	6^{5}	3
3	(Russia) M Sharapova	7^{7}	6

Second round
15	(France) M Bartoli	7	6
(United States) C McHale	5	4
(Italy) C Giorgi	7^{9}	7^{8}
22	(Romania) S Cîrstea	6^{7}	6^{6}
27	(Czech Republic) L Šafářová	6	4	4
(Italy) K Knapp	4	6	6
Q	(Portugal) M Larcher de Brito	6	6
3	(Russia) M Sharapova	3	4

Third round
15	(France) M Bartoli	6	7
(Italy) C Giorgi	4	5
(Italy) K Knapp	7	6
Q	(Portugal) M Larcher de Brito	5	2

Fourth round
15	(France) M Bartoli	6	6
(Italy) K Knapp	2	3

==== Section 7 ====
First round
8	(Czech Republic) P Kvitová	6	5	6
(United States) C Vandeweghe	1	7	4
(Netherlands) K Bertens	4	3
(Kazakhstan) Y Shvedova	6	6
(Spain) G Muguruza	6	6
WC	(United Kingdom) A Keothavong	4	0
(Sweden) J Larsson	3	3
25	(Russia) E Makarova	6	6
19	(Spain) C Suárez Navarro	6	6
(Spain) L Domínguez Lino	2	2
(Sweden) S Arvidsson	1	4
(Croatia) M Lučić-Baroni	6	6
(Canada) E Bouchard	5	7^{7}	6
Q	(Kazakhstan) G Voskoboeva	7	6^{5}	4
Q	(France) V Razzano	6^{1}	0
12	(Serbia) A Ivanovic	7^{7}	6

Second round
8	(Czech Republic) P Kvitová
(Kazakhstan) Y Shvedova	w/o
(Spain) G Muguruza	2	7^{7}	4
25	(Russia) E Makarova	6	6^{3}	6
19	(Spain) C Suárez Navarro	1	6	6
(Croatia) M Lučić-Baroni	6	3	3
(Canada) E Bouchard	6	6
12	(Serbia) A Ivanovic	3	3

Third round
8	(Czech Republic) P Kvitová	6	2	6
25	(Russia) E Makarova	3	6	3
19	(Spain) C Suárez Navarro	7	6
(Canada) E Bouchard	5	2

Fourth round
8	(Czech Republic) P Kvitová	7^{7}	6
19	(Spain) C Suárez Navarro	6^{5}	3

==== Section 8 ====
First round
16	(Serbia) J Janković	6	7
WC	(United Kingdom) J Konta	2	5
(Belgium) Y Wickmayer	6	2	4
(Serbia) V Dolonc	3	6	6
Q	(Croatia) A Tomljanović	6	1	7
(Serbia) B Jovanovski	3	6	9
(Kazakhstan) Y Putintseva	5	4
20	(Belgium) K Flipkens	7	6
29	(France) A Cornet	4	6	6
LL	(United States) V King	6	3	1
(Chinese Taipei) S-w Hsieh	6	6
(Germany) T Maria	1	0
WC	(United Kingdom) E Baltacha	4	1
(Italy) F Pennetta	6	6
(Portugal) MJ Koehler	1	2
2	(Belarus) V Azarenka	6	6

Second round
16	(Serbia) J Janković	5	2
(Serbia) V Dolonc	7	6
(Serbia) B Jovanovski	4	4
20	(Belgium) K Flipkens	6	6
29	(France) A Cornet	6	6
(Chinese Taipei) S-w Hsieh	3	2
(Italy) F Pennetta
2	(Belarus) V Azarenka	w/o

Third round
(Serbia) V Dolonc	4	2
20	(Belgium) K Flipkens	6	6
29	(France) A Cornet	6	6^{4}	2
(Italy) F Pennetta	0	7^{7}	6

Fourth round
20	(Belgium) K Flipkens	7^{7}	6
(Italy) F Pennetta	6^{2}	3

== Championship match statistics ==
Category	(France) Bartoli	(Germany) Lisicki
1st serve %	39/58 (67%)	42/65 (65%)
1st serve points won	31 of 39 = 79%	22 of 42 = 52%
2nd serve points won	7 of 19 = 37%	9 of 23 = 39%
Total service points won	38 of 58 = 65.52%	31 of 65 = 47.69%
Aces	2	6
Double faults	6	5
Winners	15	21
Unforced errors	14	25
Net points won	8 of 8 = 100%	10 of 15 = 67%
Break points converted	5 of 13 = 38%	2 of 8 = 25%
Return points won	34 of 65 = 52%	20 of 58 = 34%
Total points won	72	51

Preceded by 2013 French Open – Women's singles	Grand Slam women's singles	Succeeded by 2013 US Open – Women's singles
