= List of state highways in Maryland shorter than one mile (900–999) =

Highway names
- Interstates: Interstate X (I-X)
- US Highways: U.S. Route X (US X)
- State: Maryland Route X (MD X)

System links
- Maryland highway system; Interstate; US; State; Scenic Byways
- Short; 2–699; 700–799; 800–899; 900–999

The following is a list of state highways in Maryland shorter than one mile (1.6 km) in length with route numbers between 900 and 999. Most of these highways act as service roads, old alignments of more prominent highways, or connectors between one or more highways. Many of these highways are unsigned and have multiple segments with the same number. Several of these highways have their own articles; those highways are summarized here and a link is provided to the main article. This list does not include highways where at least one highway of that number is at least one mile in length. All highways at least one mile in length have their own article. The highways shorter than one mile with the same number are covered in the main article for the highway.

== MD 903 ==
Maryland Route 903
- Location: Sideling Hill
- Length: 0.91 mi (1,460 m)

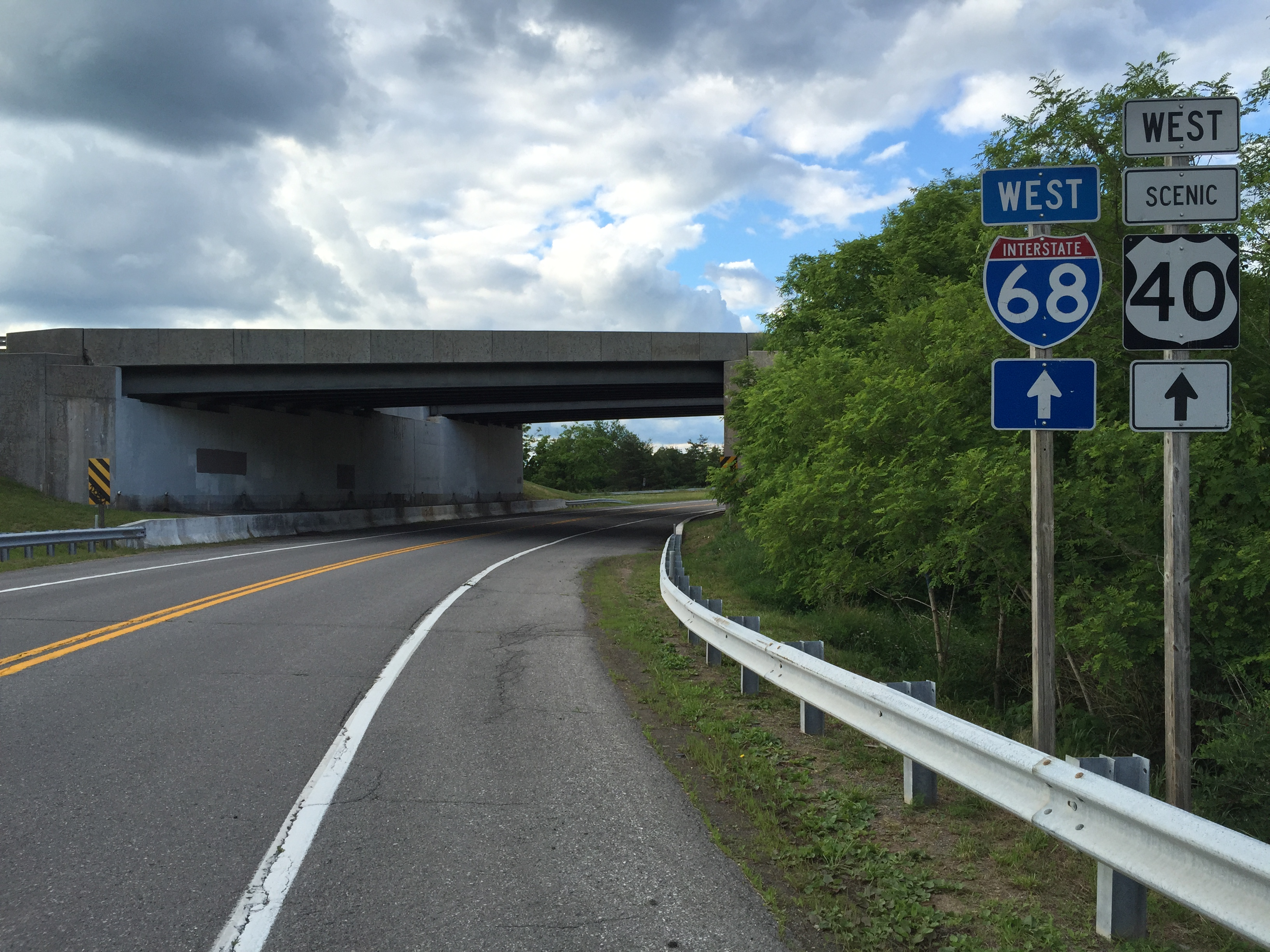
View north along MD 903 and west along US 40 Scenic at I-68/US 40 near Sideling Hill

Maryland Route 903 is the unsigned designation for a 0.91-mile (1.46 km) section of Mountain Road on the western slope of Sideling Hill in far western Washington County from the Exit 74 exit ramp from eastbound I-68 north to the Exit 74 entrance ramp to westbound I-68. MD 903 is not signed as such; rather, the northbound direction is signed as part of westbound US 40 Scenic.

Browse numbered routes
← MD 899	MD	→ MD 904

== MD 904 ==
Maryland Route 904
- Location: Carroll County, Emmitsburg

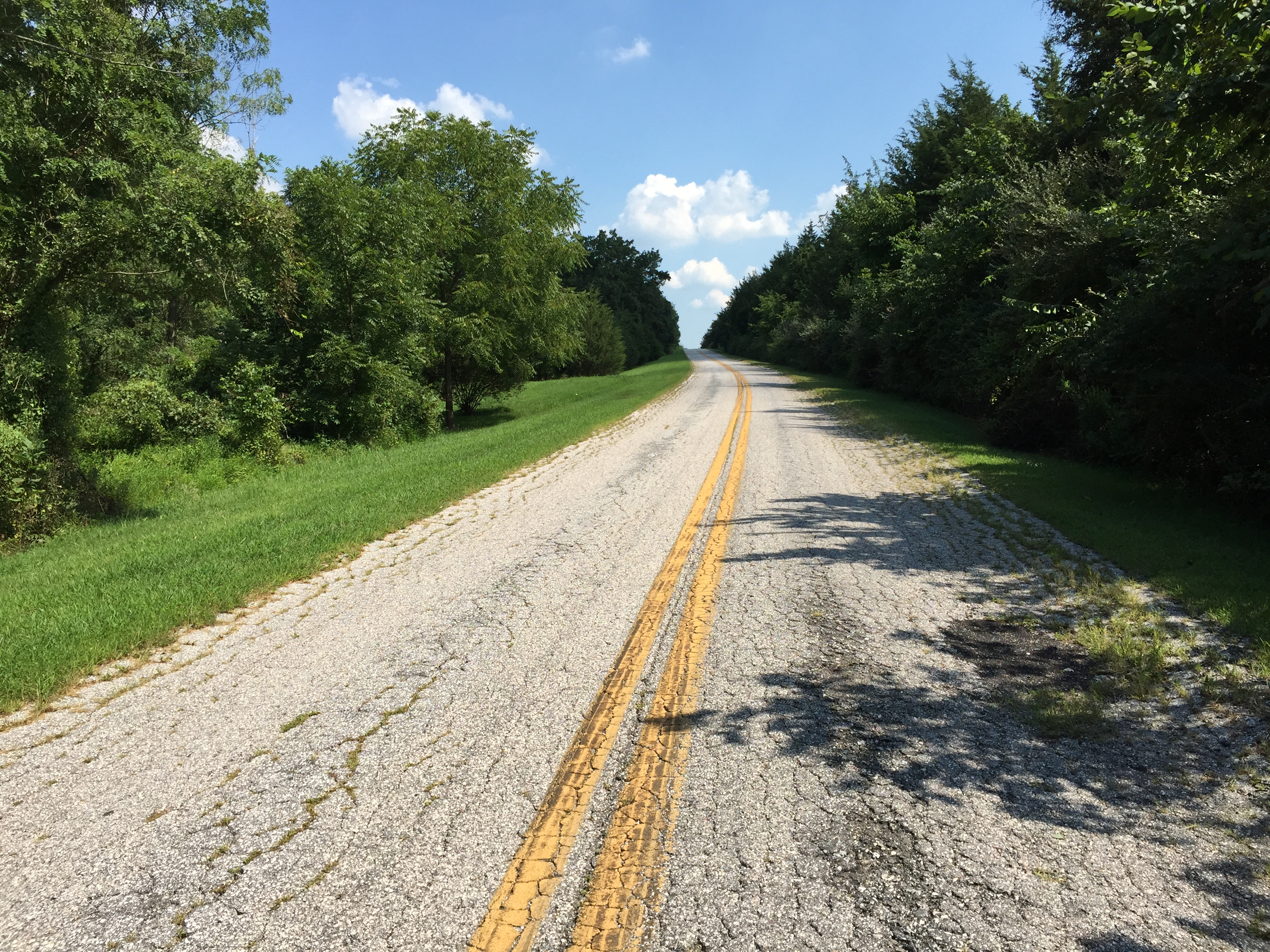
View east along MD 904D in Carroll County

Maryland Route 904 is the unsigned designation for several service roads in Carroll County and portions of the old alignment of MD 140 in Emmitsburg in northern Frederick County.

- MD 904 is the designation for Nelson Road, which runs 0.58 miles (0.93 km) from MD 32 just east of its intersection with MD 97 in Fenby north to a private driveway.
- MD 904A is the designation for Ben Rose Lane, which runs 0.66 miles (1.06 km) from Jim Bowers Road just east of its intersection with Bartholow Road, which connects it with MD 97, north to the entrance to Morgan Run Natural Environment Area.
- MD 904D is the designation for Runnymede Road, which runs 0.63 miles (1.01 km) from Bear Run Road northwest parallel to the northbound side of MD 140 to a private drive east of Taneytown.
- MD 904F is the designation for Emmit Gardens Drive, which runs 0.19 miles (0.31 km) from MD 140 and Silo Hill Road east to right-in/right-out interchange ramps with southbound US 15 in Emmitsburg.
- MD 904H is the designation for Emmit Gardens Drive, which runs 0.21 miles (0.34 km) from right-in/right-out interchange ramps with northbound US 15 east to MD 140 and Harney Road in Emmitsburg.
- MD 904I is the designation for Emmit Gardens Drive, which runs 0.04 miles (0.064 km) from First Avenue east to MD 904F in Emmitsburg.

Browse numbered routes
← MD 903	→ MD 908

== MD 909 ==
Maryland Route 909
- Location: Davidsonville
- Length: 0.80 mi (1,290 m)

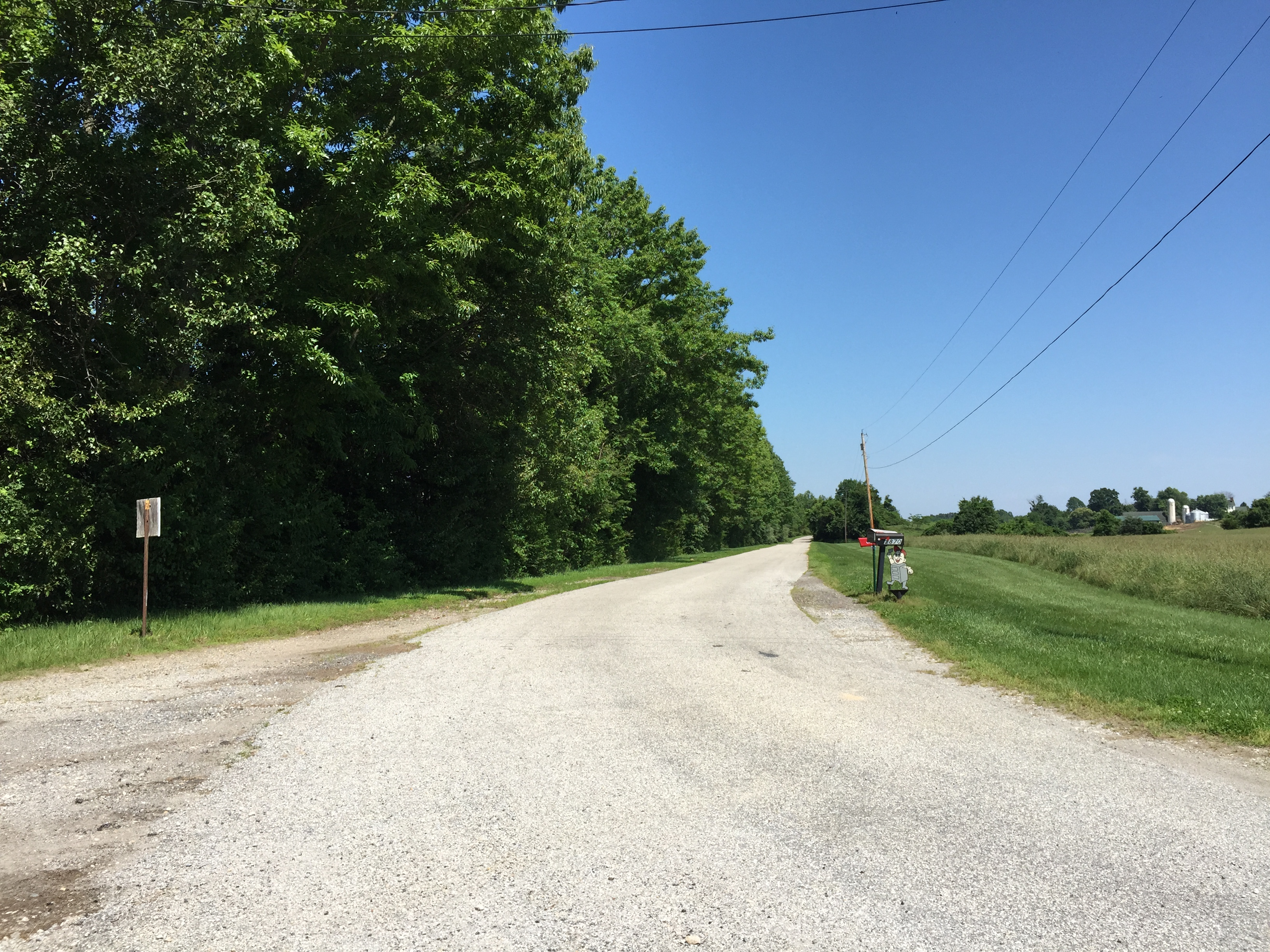
View south at the north end of MD 909 near Davidsonville

Maryland Route 909 is the unsigned designation for MD 424 Service Road, which runs from MD 424 north to a dead end in Davidsonville, Anne Arundel County. The route is 0.80 mi (1.29 km) long.

Browse numbered routes
← MD 908	→ MD 910

== MD 910 ==
Maryland Route 910
- Location: Mount Aetna, Hagerstown

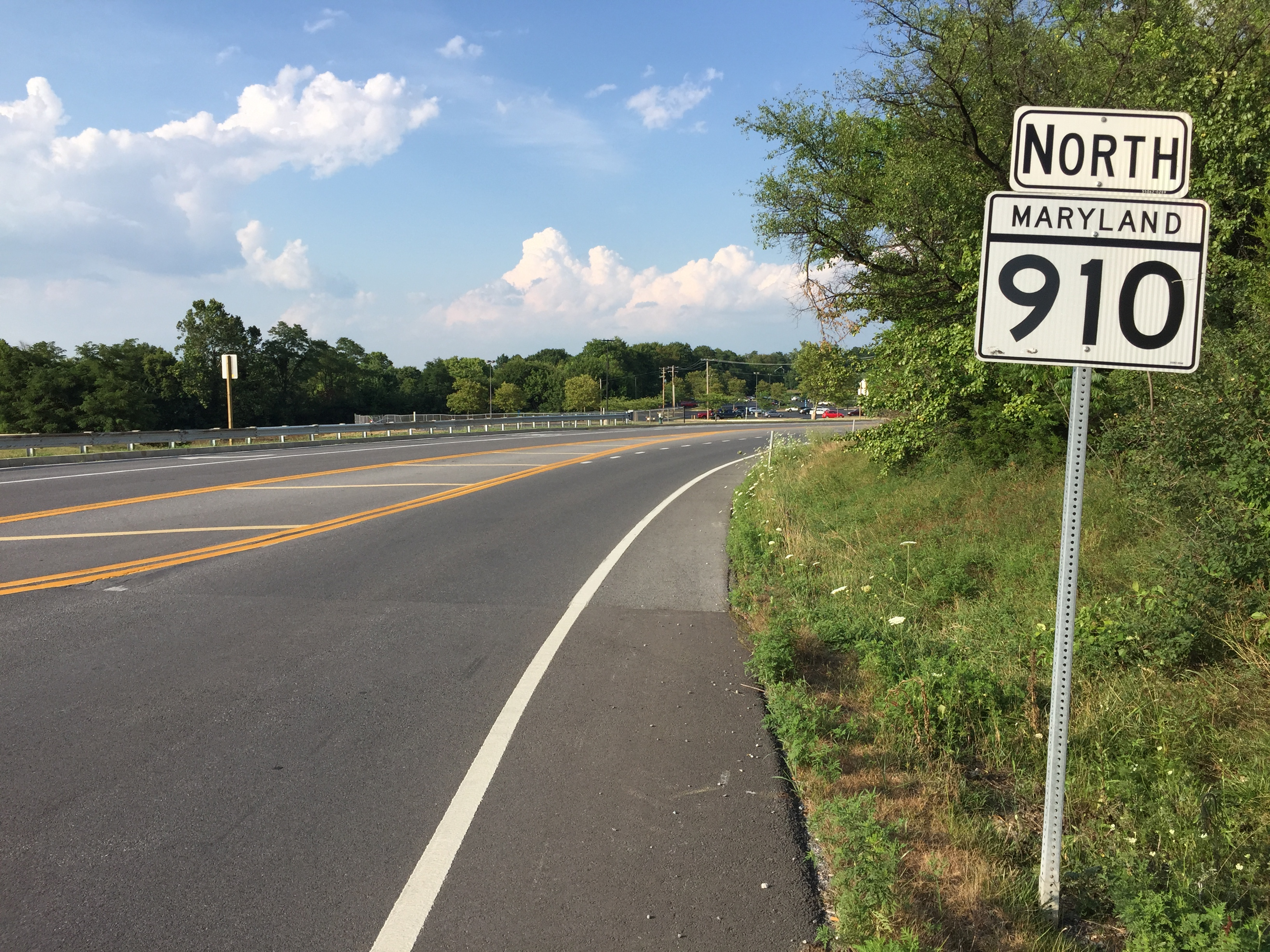
View north along MD 910 at MD 144 in Hagerstown

Maryland Route 910 is the designation for a pair of highways in Washington County.

- MD 910B is the designation for an unnamed 0.14-mile (0.23 km) service road spur from MD 66 just north of I-70.
- MD 910C is the designation for a 0.59-mile (0.95 km) section of Western Maryland Parkway between a roundabout at MD 144WA (Washington Street) and US 40 in Hagerstown. The highway continues south as a county road serving an industrial park. In 2015, a roundabout was constructed at MD 144WA.

Browse numbered routes
← MD 909	→ MD 911

== MD 911 ==
Maryland Route 911
- Location: Rockville
- Length: 0.21 mi (340 m)

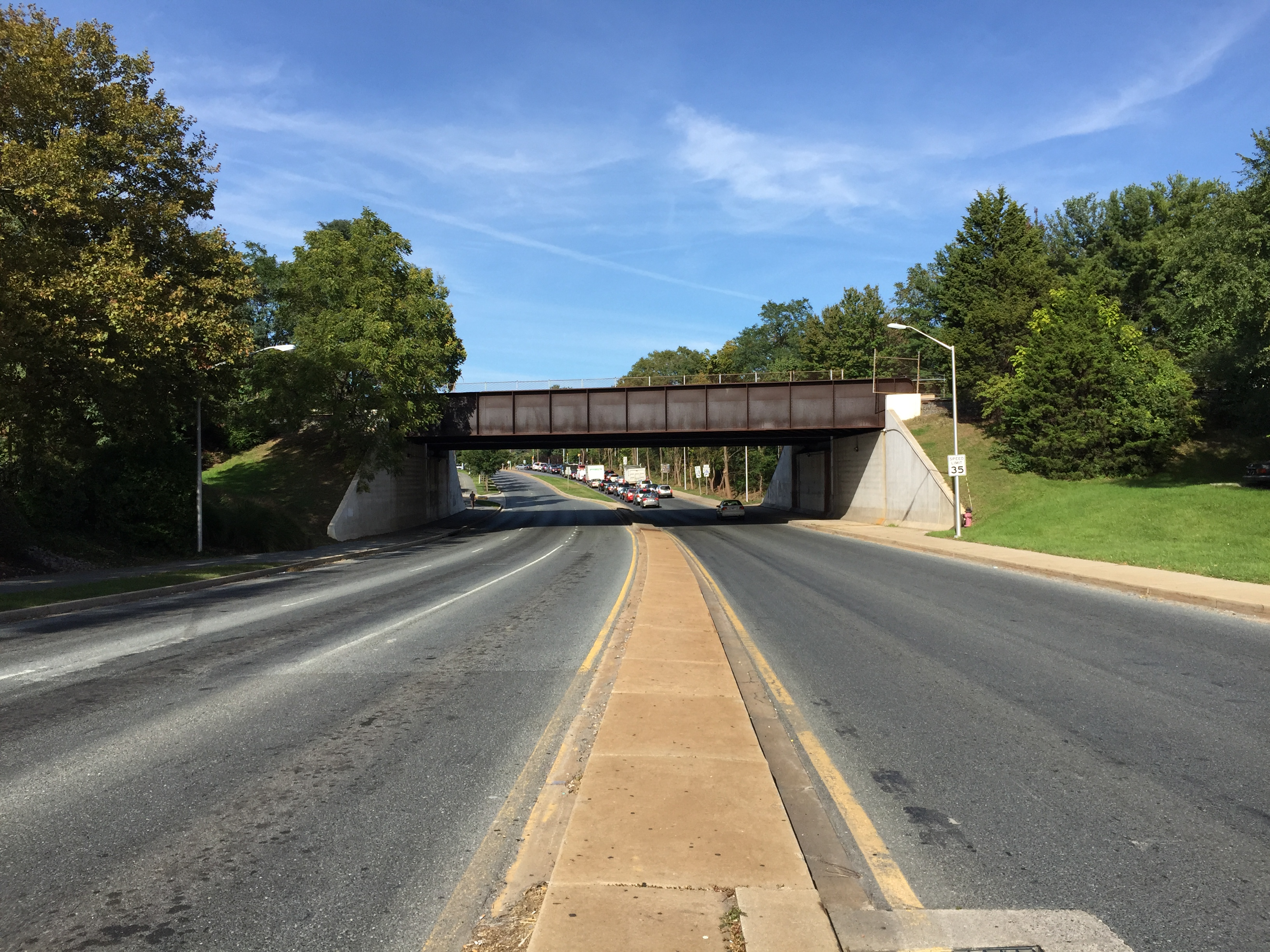
View north along MD 911 at MD 355 in Rockville

Maryland Route 911 is the designation for First Street, a 0.21-mile (0.34 km) connector between the intersection of MD 355 (Rockville Pike) and Wootton Parkway and the intersection of MD 28 (Veirs Mill Road/First Street) and MD 586 (Veirs Mill Road) within Rockville. Along the way, the route passes under CSX's Metropolitan Subdivision railroad line.

Browse numbered routes
← MD 910	→ MD 915

== MD 915 ==
Maryland Route 915
- Location: Pasadena
- Length: 0.47 mi (760 m)

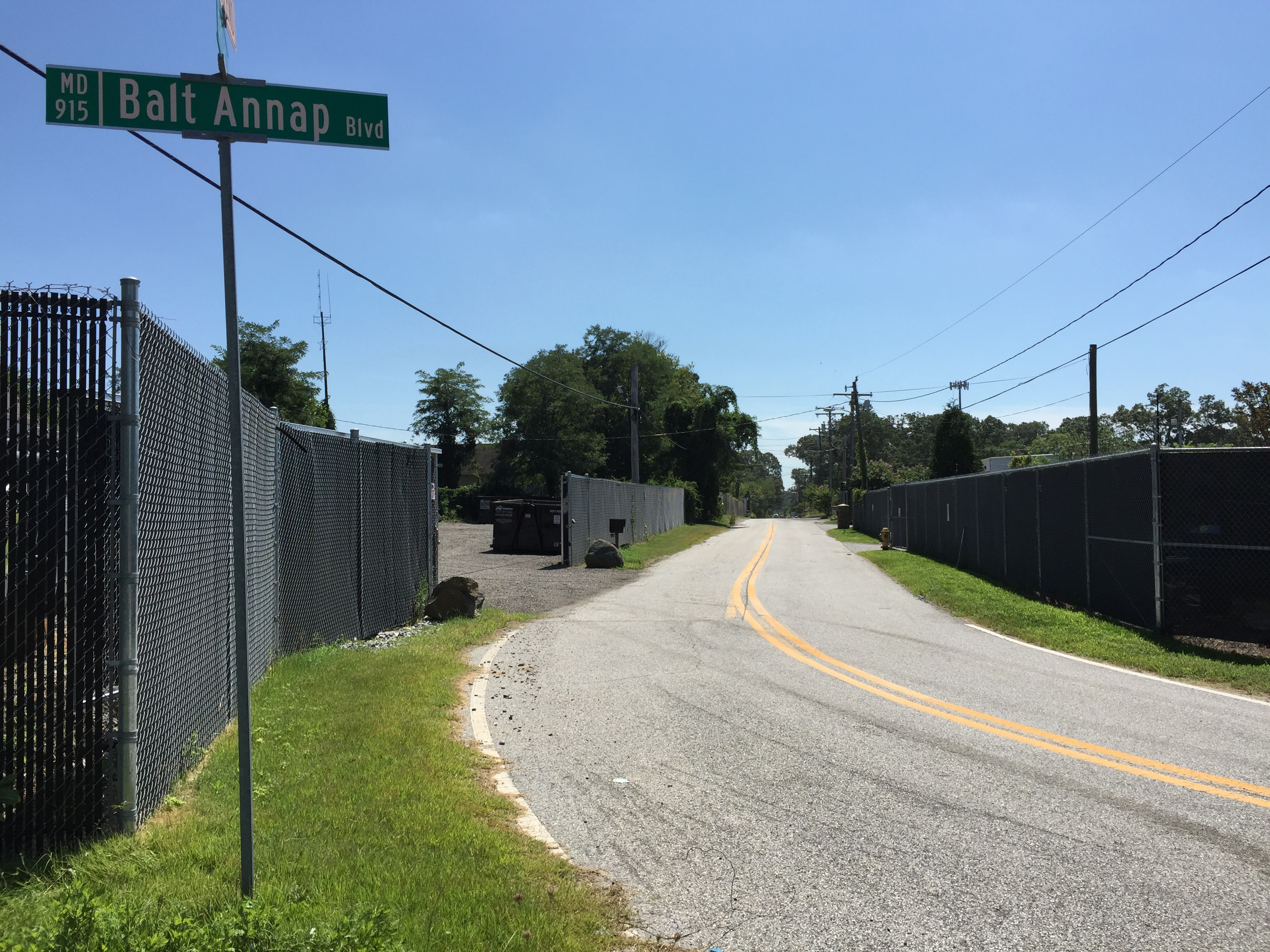
View south along MD 915 at MD 915H in Pasadena

Maryland Route 915 is the designation for Baltimore-Annapolis Boulevard, which runs from MD 648 north to MD 915H in Pasadena, Anne Arundel County. The route is 0.80 mi (1.29 km) long and is only signed on a street sign.

The route has two auxiliary routes:

- MD 915A is the unsigned designation for Long Hill Road, which runs from a dead end north to MD 177. The route is 0.89 mi (1.43 km) long.
- MD 915H is the unsigned designation for Ember Drive, which runs from a dead end east to MD 915. The route is 0.47 mi (0.76 km) long.

Browse numbered routes
← MD 911	→ MD 917

== MD 917 ==
Maryland Route 917
- Location: Jessup
- Length: 0.09 mi (140 m)

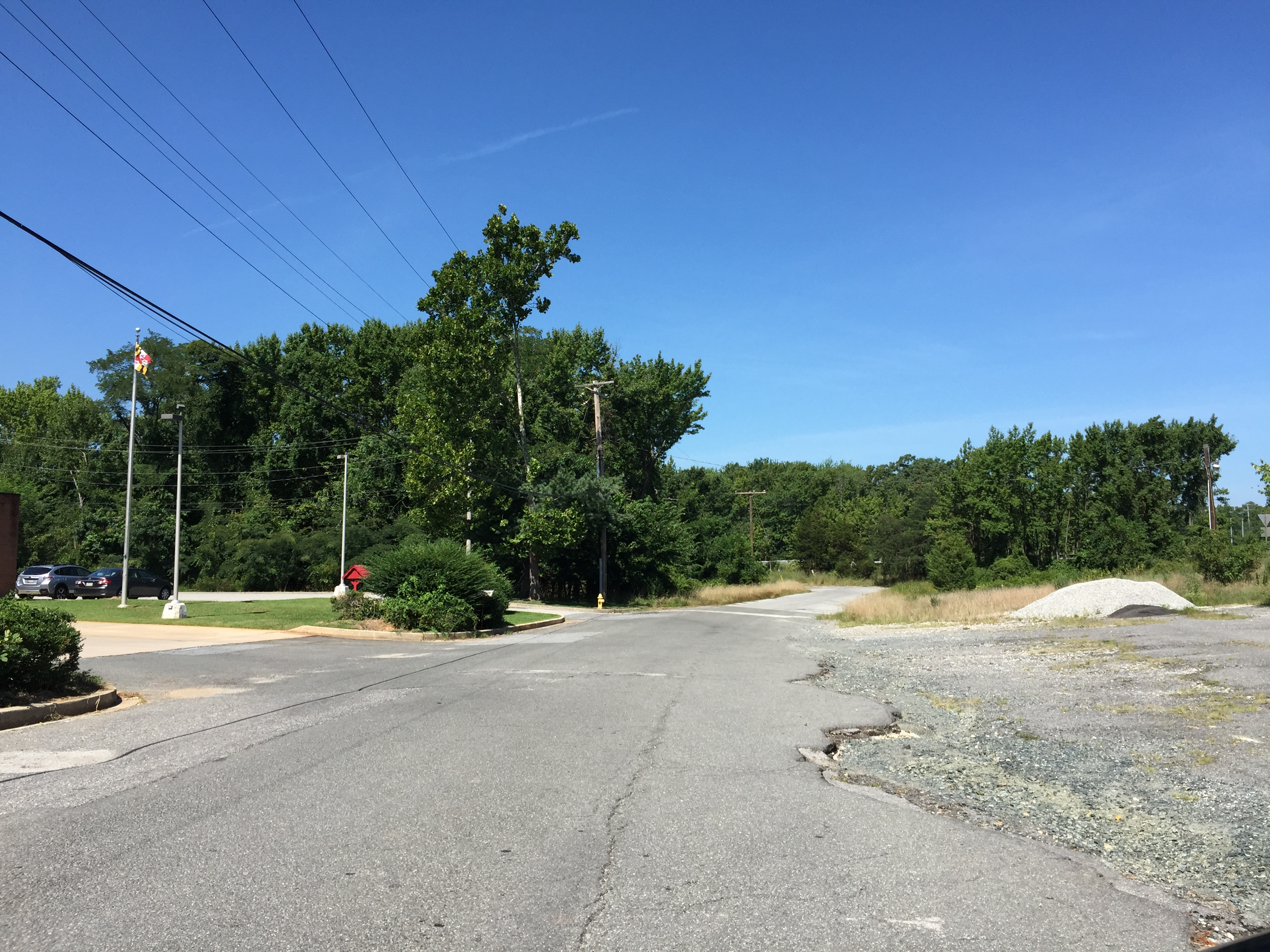
MD 917 in Jessup

Maryland Route 917 is the unsigned designation for Max Blobs Park Road, which runs from MD 175AA north to county-maintained Max Blob Park Road in Jessup, Anne Arundel County. The route is 0.09 mi (0.14 km) long.

Browse numbered routes
← MD 915	→ MD 918

== MD 918 ==
Maryland Route 918
- Location: Princess Anne
- Length: 0.22 mi (350 m)

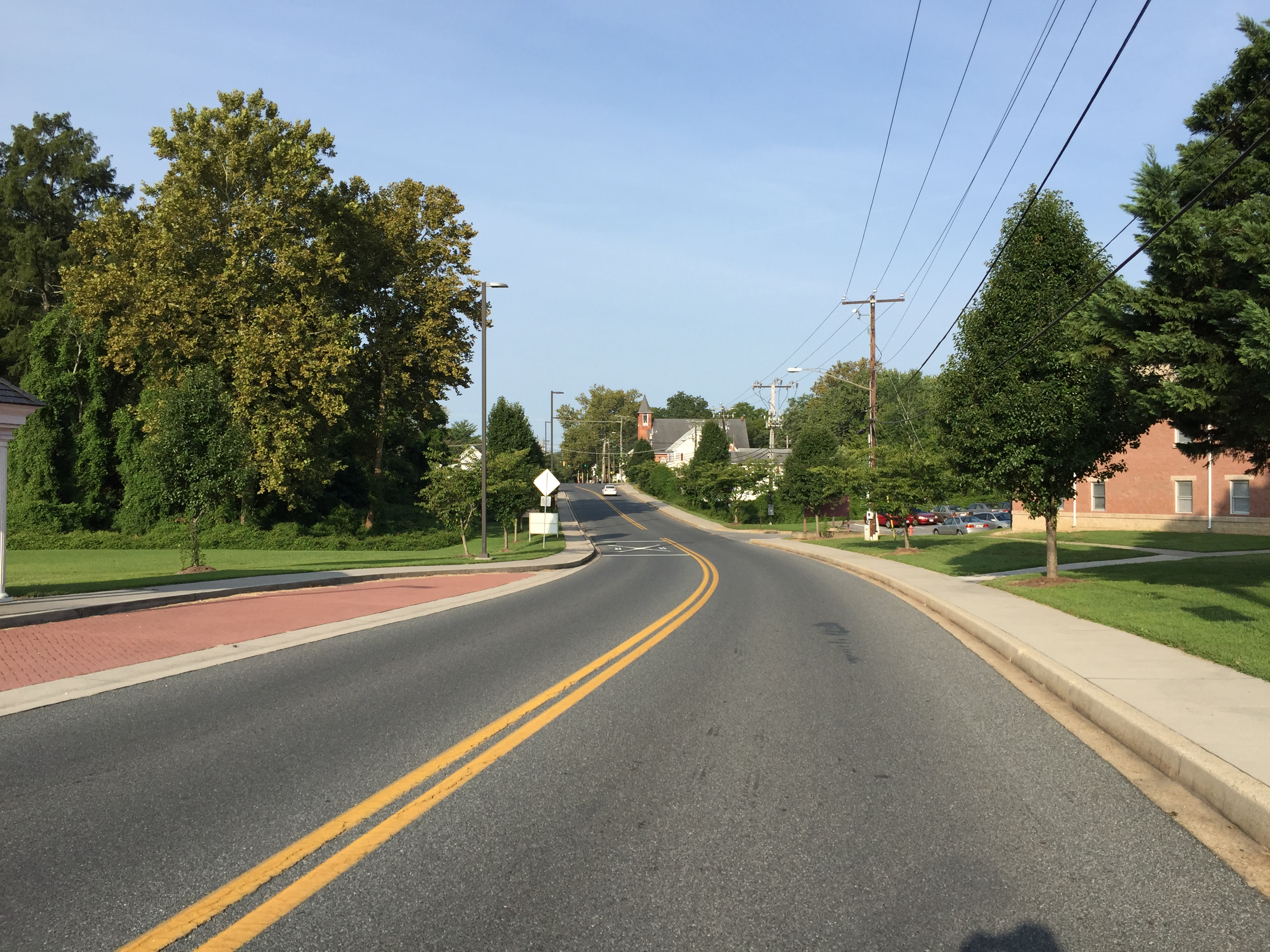
View west from the east end of MD 918 at the University of Maryland Eastern Shore campus in Princess Anne

Maryland Route 918 is the unsigned designation for Dr William P. Hytche Boulevard (renamed from East Broad Street) in Princess Anne, Somerset County, which runs from MD 675 east to the University of Maryland Eastern Shore campus. The route is 0.22 miles (0.35 km) long. MD 918 heads east from MD 675 as a two-lane undivided road through residential areas. The route crosses Manokin Branch and passes to the south of a university residential complex. MD 918 crosses the Delmarva Central Railroad's Delmarva Subdivision railroad line at-grade before it reaches its eastern terminus at an intersection with College Backbone Road on the university campus grounds.

Browse numbered routes
← MD 917	→ MD 920

== MD 920 ==
Maryland Route 920
- Location: West Pocomoke–Princess Anne

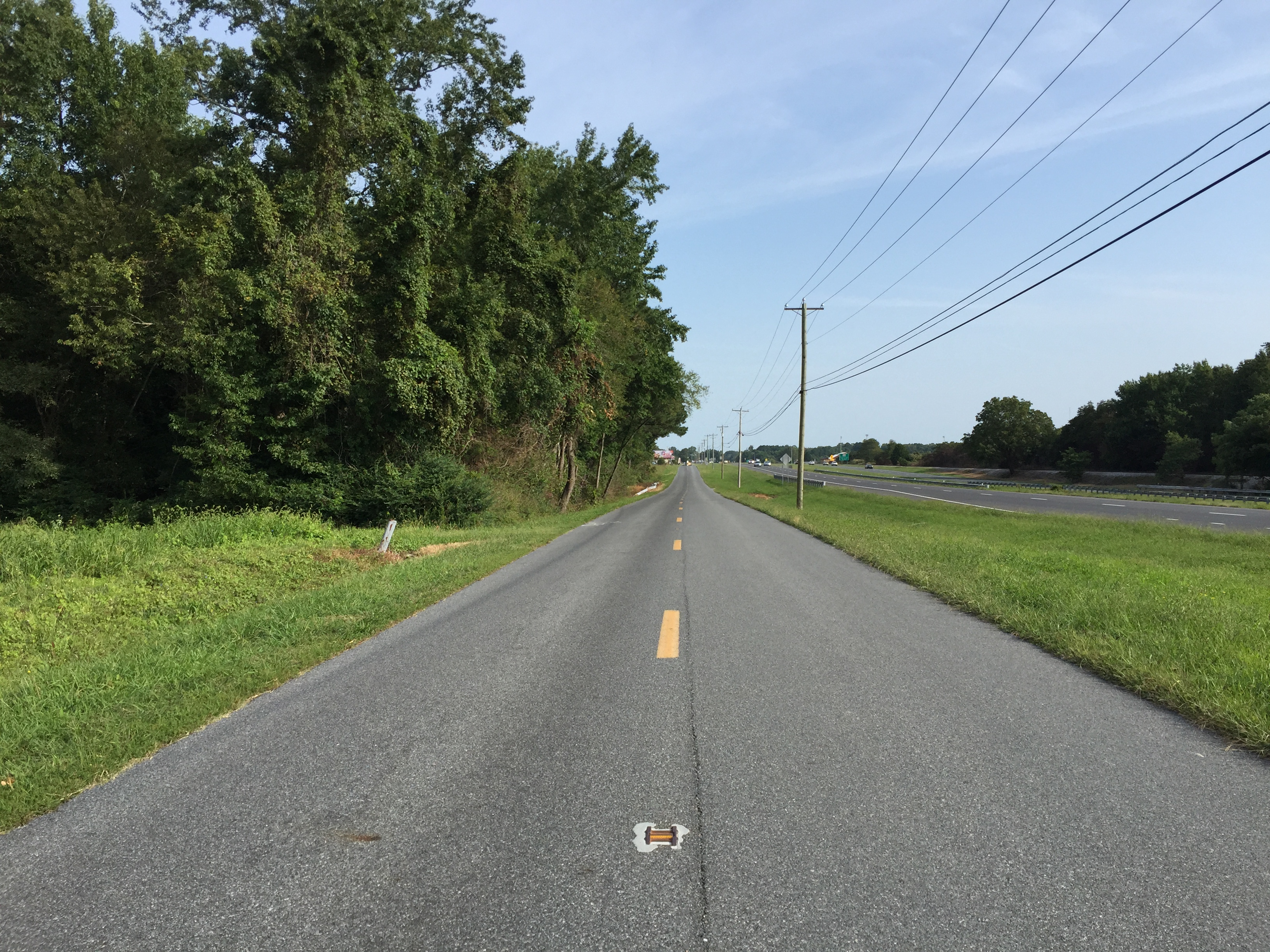
View north along MD 920 at King Miller Road in Somerset County

Maryland Route 920 is a collection of 19 unsigned state highways that are service roads constructed to restore access to private property or county highways whose access was compromised by the expansion of US 13 to a partially controlled-access divided highway in the 1960s between West Pocomoke and Princess Anne in Somerset County. US 13 was expanded to a divided highway from the southern end of the Princess Anne bypass south past Kings Creek in 1962, south through Westover in 1963, and south to about 2 miles (3.2 km) north of MD 667 in 1964. The Princess Anne bypass was expanded to a divided highway in 1965. US 13's expansion to a four-lane highway in Maryland was completed in 1966 when the federal highway was expanded to a divided highway from north of MD 667 south past West Pocomoke to the southern end of the Pocomoke City bypass.

- MD 920 is the designation for Market Lane, a 0.97-mile (1.56 km) service road that runs from US 13 adjacent to Bardwell Drive north to US 13 at its intersection with North Central School Road. The highway parallels the southbound side of US 13, with its northern terminus just south of the southern terminus of MD 675 in Princess Anne. MD 920 provides access to the Princess Anne Shop of the Maryland State Highway Administration at its northern end.
- MD 920A is the designation for Brittingham Lane, a 0.42-mile (0.68 km) service road that runs from MD 362 in Princess Anne north to a dead end, paralleling the southbound side of US 13.
- MD 920B is the designation for Spring Lane, a 0.32-mile (0.51 km) service road that runs from the intersection of US 13 and MD 673A (Sam Barnes Road) north to Camp Road in Westover, paralleling the northbound side of US 13. MD 920B provides access to a park and ride near its southern terminus.
- MD 920C is the designation for Sawmill Lane, a 0.17-mile (0.27 km) service road that runs from the intersection of US 13 and Old Princess Anne Road east to a dead end in Westover, paralleling the southbound side of US 13.
- MD 920D is the designation for Lisa Lane, a 0.42-mile (0.68 km) service road that runs between two dead ends on the northbound side of US 13 near Westover. The road is connected to US 13 by a spur in the middle of its length.
- MD 920F is the designation for Tips Lane, a 0.08-mile (0.13 km) service road that heads east from the intersection of US 13 and MD 920H (Fortune Lane). The road meets MD 920G, then turns north to a dead end.
- MD 920G is the designation for another segment of Tips Lane, a 0.09-mile (0.14 km) service road that heads east from MD 920F, paralleling the northbound side of US 13.
- MD 920H is the designation for Fortune Lane, a 0.09-mile (0.14 km) service road that heads south from the intersection of US 13 and MD 920F, then turns west to a dead end.
- MD 920J is the designation for Lake Somerset Road, a 0.23-mile (0.37 km) service road that runs from a dead end east to the entrance to Lake Somerset Camp. The road, which parallels the southbound side of US 13, is connected to that highway by a spur adjacent to the eastern terminus.
- MD 920K is the designation for Flea Market Lane, a 0.16-mile (0.26 km) service road that runs from Walter Johnson Road north to a dead end, paralleling the northbound side of US 13.
- MD 920L is the designation for Greenhill Lane, a 0.83-mile (1.34 km) service road that runs from Mennonite Church Road east to a dead end, passing two churches while paralleling the southbound side of US 13.
- MD 920M is the designation for an unnamed 0.04-mile (0.064 km) long service road that runs north from Walter Johnson Road near the county highway's southern intersection with US 13.
- MD 920N is the designation for Dukes Lane, a 0.10-mile (0.16 km) service road that runs between two dead ends on the southbound side of US 13. The road is connected to US 13 by a spur toward its west end.
- MD 920O is the designation for Cottman Lane, a 0.11-mile (0.18 km) service road that runs between two dead ends on the southbound side of US 13. The road is connected to US 13 by a spur toward its west end at US 13's northern intersection with Costen Road.
- MD 920P is the designation for Woods Lane, a 0.28-mile (0.45 km) service road that runs from US 13 at its intersection with MD 920Q north, then turns west to parallel the northbound side of US 13.
- MD 920Q is the designation for Quail Lane, a 0.20-mile (0.32 km) service road that runs from US 13 at its intersection with MD 920P south, then turns west to parallel the southbound side of US 13.
- MD 920R is the designation for Fishing Hole Road, a 0.06-mile (0.097 km) service road that runs between two dead ends on the northbound side of US 13. The road is connected to US 13 by a spur in the middle of its length.
- MD 920S is the designation for Short Lane, a 0.10-mile (0.16 km) service road that runs between two dead ends on the southbound side of US 13 near MD 920R. The road is connected to US 13 by a spur near its western end.
- MD 920T is the designation for Dairy Lane, a 0.04-mile (0.064 km) service road that runs between two dead ends on the southbound side of US 13. The road is connected to US 13 by a spur in the middle of its length.

Browse numbered routes
← MD 918	→ MD 921

== MD 921 ==
Maryland Route 921
- Location: Worcester County

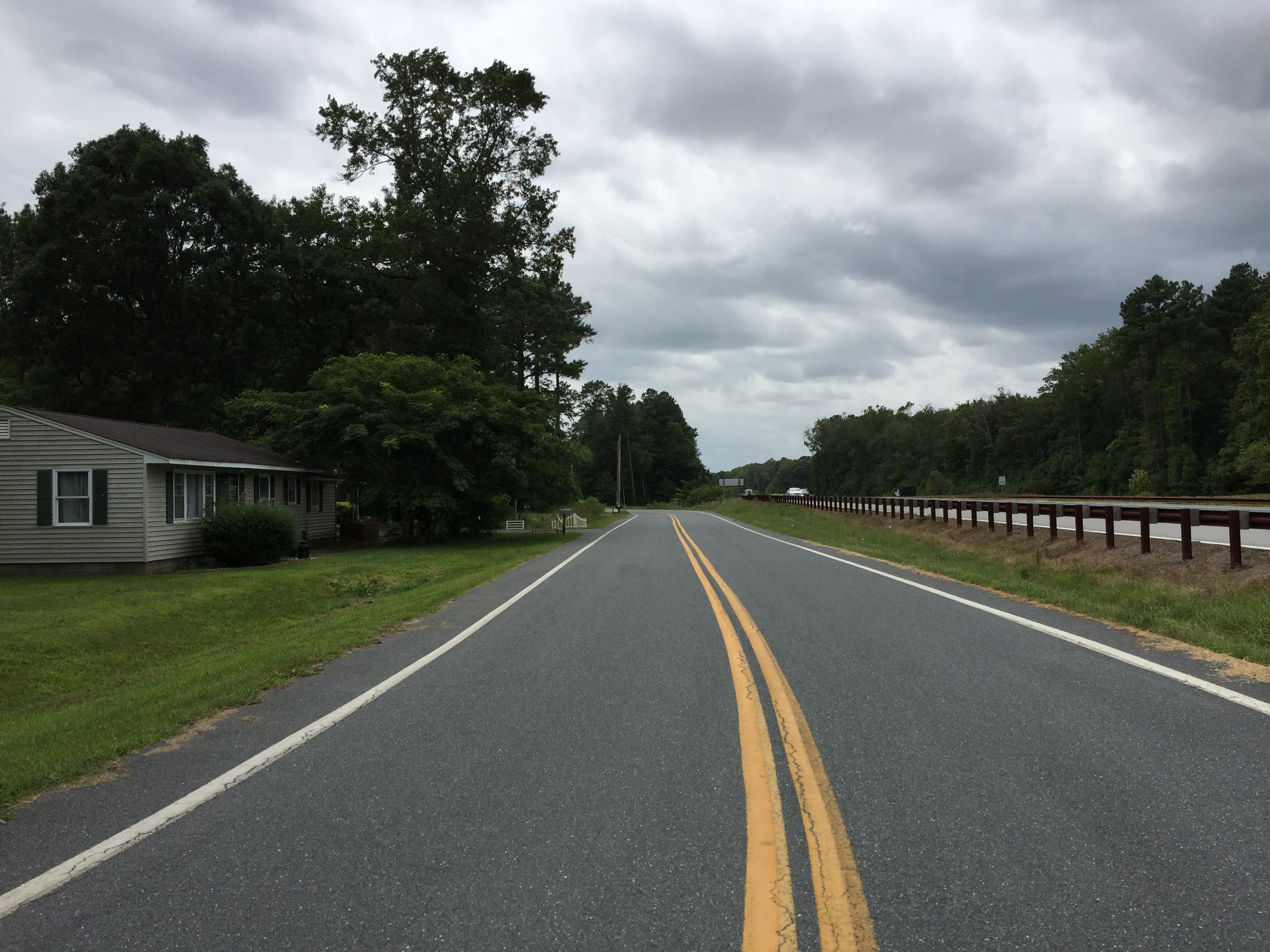
View south along MD 921I in Worcester County

Maryland Route 921 is the unsigned designation given to a collection of service roads off U.S. Route 113 in Worcester County.

- MD 921A is the designation for Access Road A, which runs 0.02 mi (0.032 km) from US 113 west to a dead end. The route was created in 2011.
- MD 921B is the designation for Access Road B, which runs 0.04 mi (0.064 km) from US 113 east to a dead end. The route was created in 2011.
- MD 921C is the designation for Bay Harbour Road, which runs 0.14 mi (0.23 km) from a cul-de-sac north to Cropper Island Road. The route was created in 2011.
- MD 921D is the designation for Lariton Woods Road, which runs 0.217 mi (0.349 km) from Downs Road east to a cul-de-sac. The route was created in 2011.
- MD 921E is the designation for Access Road E, which runs 0.035 mi (0.056 km) from US 113 east to a dead end. The route was created in 2011.
- MD 921F is the designation for Culver Lane, which runs 0.035 mi (0.056 km) from US 113 west to a dead end. The route was created in 2011.
- MD 921G is the designation for Shiloh Farms Road, which runs 0.28 mi (0.45 km) from US 113 south to a cul-de-sac. The route was created in 2009.
- MD 921H is the designation for Access Road H, which runs 0.12 mi (0.19 km) from MD 921G north to a cul-de-sac. The route was created in 2009.
- MD 921I is the designation for Access Road I, which runs 0.44 mi (0.71 km) from MD 921J south to a cul-de-sac. The route was created in 2009.
- MD 921J is the designation for East Shire Drive, which runs 0.03 mi (0.048 km) from US 113 east to MD 921I. The route was created in 2009.
- MD 921K is the designation for Access Road K, which runs 0.08 mi (0.13 km) from Shire Drive south to a cul-de-sac. The route was created in 2009.
- MD 921L is the designation for Access Road L, which runs 0.02 mi (0.032 km) from US 113 east to a dead end. The route was created in 2009.
- MD 921M is the designation for Access Road M, which runs 0.125 mi (0.201 km) from US 113 south to a dead end. The route was created in 2011.
- MD 921N is the designation for Access Road N, which runs 0.13 mi (0.21 km) from Ironshire Station Road south to a cul-de-sac. The route was created in 2009.
- MD 921O is the designation for Access Road O, which runs 0.07 mi (0.11 km) from Mason Road north to a cul-de-sac. The route was created in 2009.
- MD 921P is the designation for Nock Landing Road, which runs 0.03 mi (0.048 km) from US 113 west to a private drive. The route was created in 2009.
- MD 921R is the designation for Horseshoe Road, which runs 0.036 mi (0.058 km) from US 113 west to a cul-de-sac. The route was created in 2011.

Browse numbered routes
← MD 920	→ MD 922

== MD 922 ==
Maryland Route 922
- Location: Bel Air
- Length: 0.24 mi (390 m)

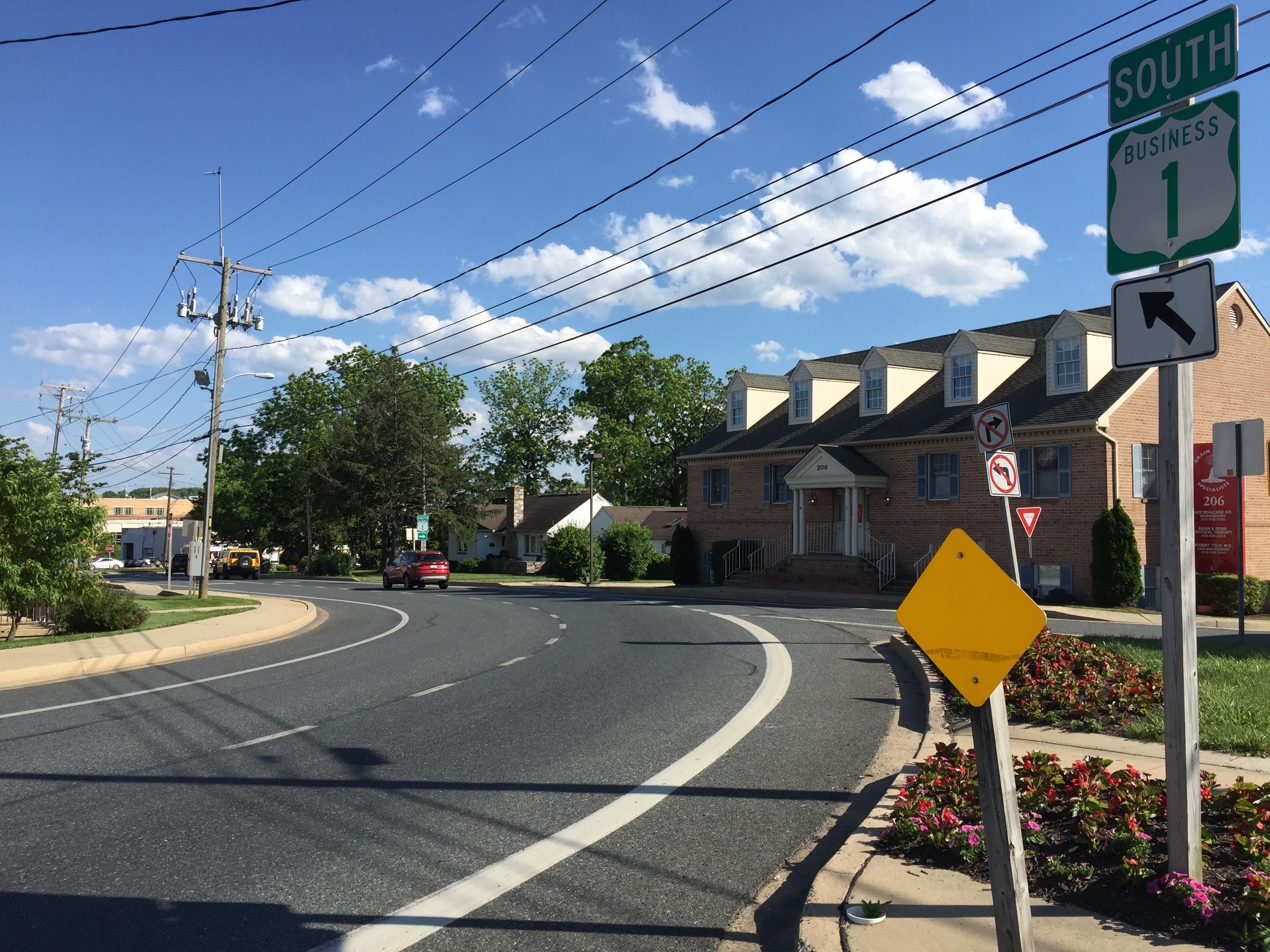
View west along MD 922 as it turns from Churchville Road onto Hays Street in Bel Air

Maryland Route 922E is the unsigned designation for the westernmost portion of Churchville Road and a small section of Hays Street in Bel Air, Harford County, which runs from Maryland Route 924 to U.S. Route 1 Business for a distance of 0.24 miles (0.39 km). The road is one-way westbound.

Browse numbered routes
← MD 921	→ MD 924

== MD 927 ==
Maryland Route 927
- Location: Montgomery County
- Length: 0.45 mi (720 m)

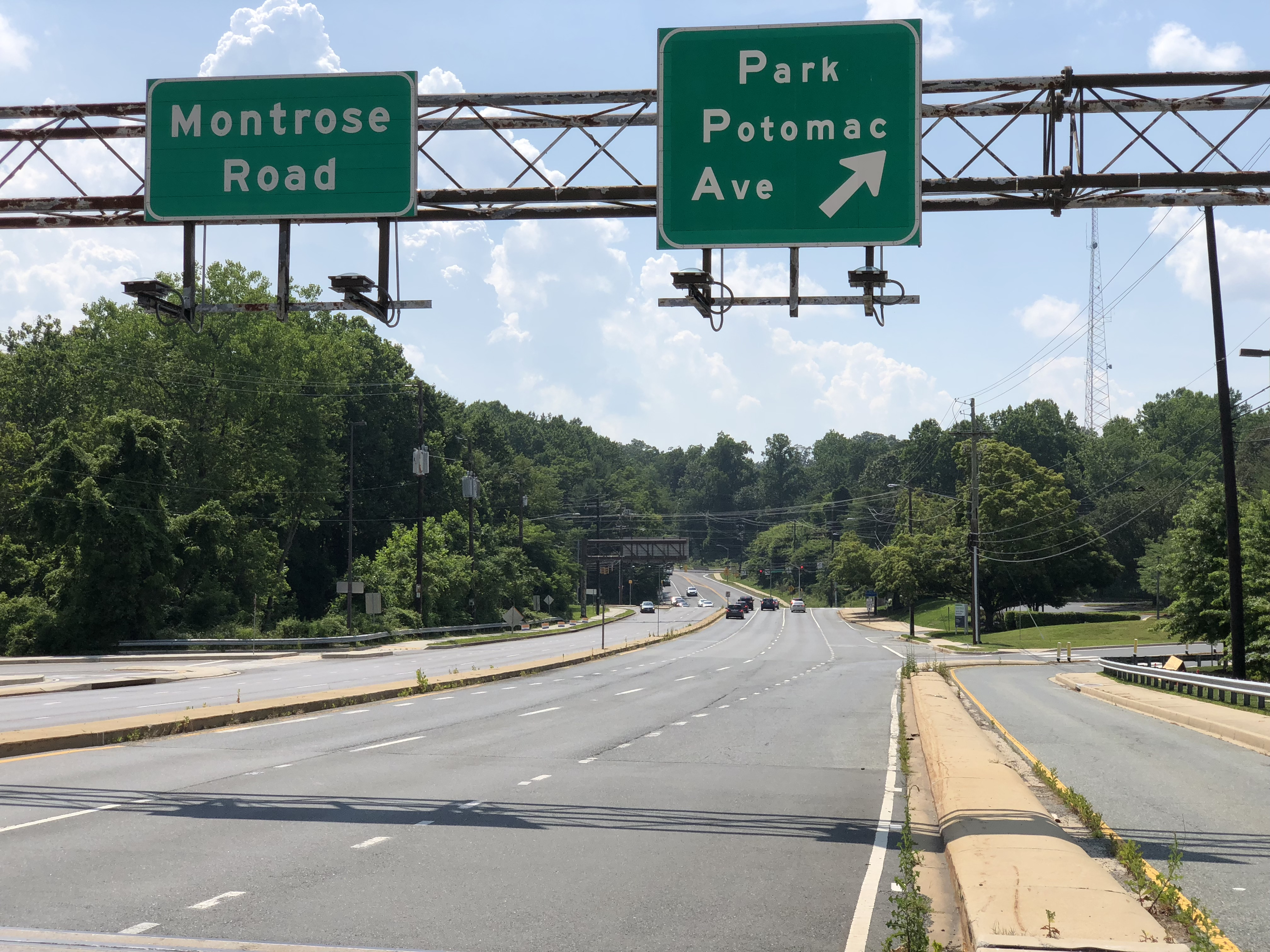
View west along MD 927 just west of I-270 in Potomac

Maryland Route 927 is the unsigned designation for the portion of Montrose Road at the interchange with I-270 in North Bethesda and Potomac in central Montgomery County. The route is 0.45 mi (0.72 km) long.

- MD 927A is the unsigned designation for Montrose Parkway at the interchange with MD 355 in North Bethesda. The route is 0.11 mi (0.18 km) long.

Browse numbered routes
← MD 925	→ MD 928

== MD 928 ==
Maryland Route 928
- Location: Norbeck
- Length: 0.15 mi (240 m)

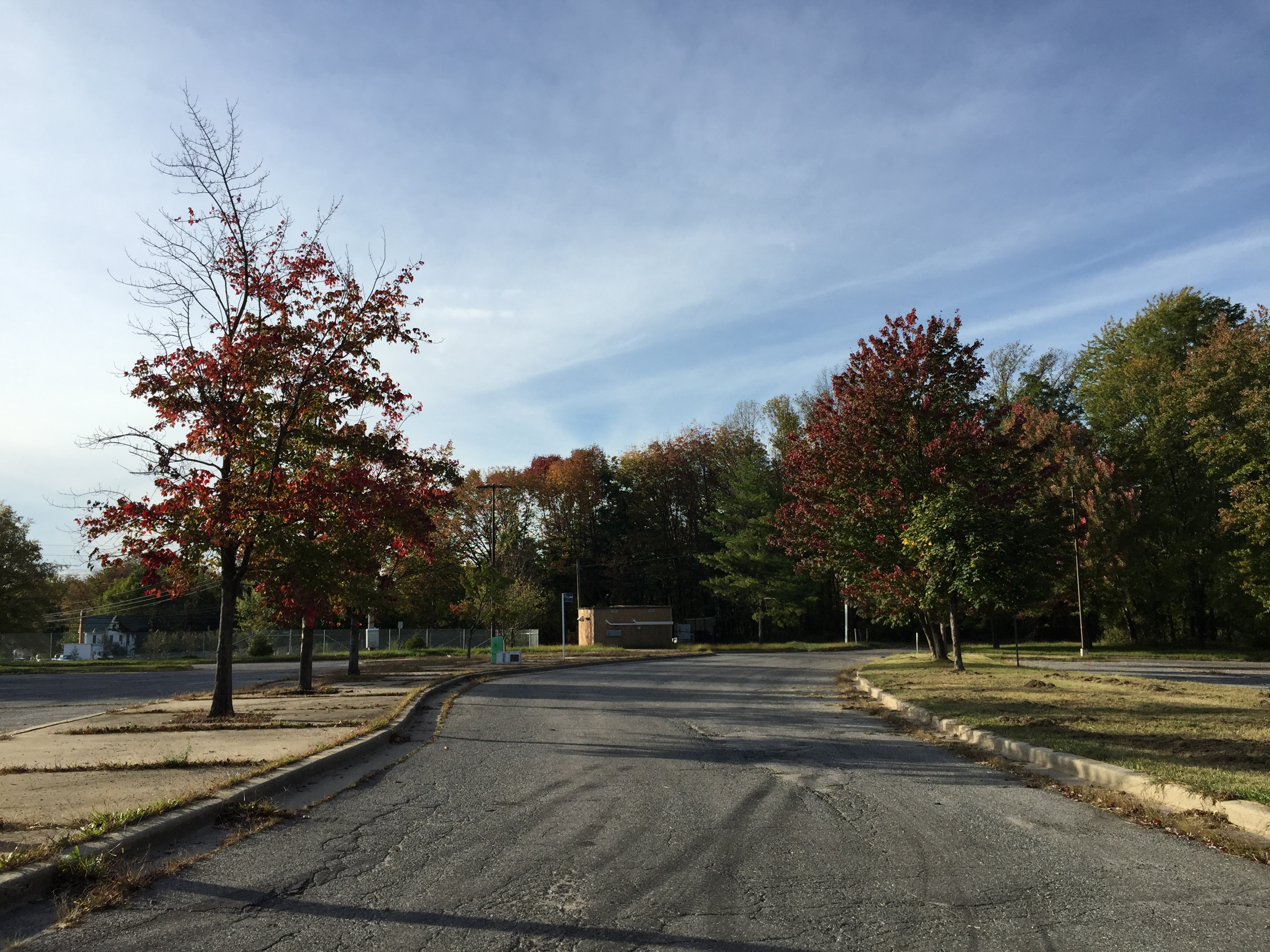
View north along MD 928 at MD 28 in Norbeck

Maryland Route 928 is the unsigned designation for an unnamed road running from Clara Downey Avenue south to MD 28 in Norbeck, Montgomery County, serving a park and ride lot. The southernmost section is one-way southbound. The route is 0.15 mi (0.24 km) long. In 2015, the northern terminus of MD 928 was cut back from MD 28 to its current location because of the construction of Clara Downey Avenue and the southernmost portion became one-way.

Browse numbered routes
← MD 927	→ MD 929

== MD 929 ==
Maryland Route 929
- Location: Montgomery County

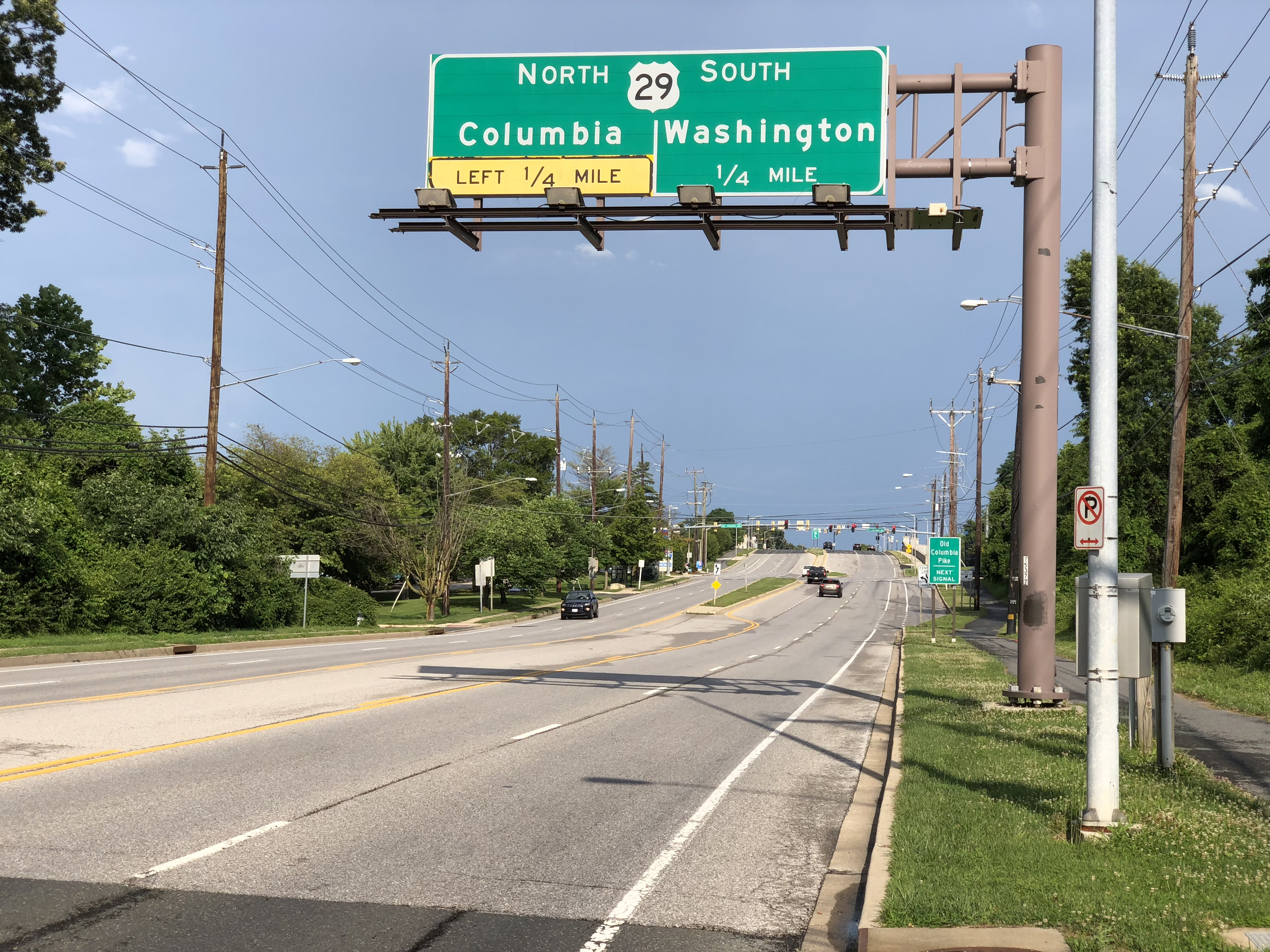
View east along MD 929B in Fairland

Maryland Route 929 is the unsigned designation for six stretches of road near US 29 in Montgomery County:

- MD 929A is the designation for East Randolph Road at the interchange with US 29 in Fairland. The route ends at the bridge over US 29, where it continues east as MD 929B. The route is 0.31 mi (0.50 km) long.
- MD 929B is eastern continuation of MD 929A along Cherry Hill Road at the interchange with US 29 in Fairland. The route is 0.25 mi (0.40 km) long.
- MD 929C is the designation for a portion of Old Columbia Pike at the intersection with MD 929A in Fairland. The route is 0.18 mi (0.29 km) long.
- MD 929D is the designation for a portion of Prosperity Drive running from the beginning of state maintenance north to MD 929B in Fairland. The route is 0.05 mi (0.080 km) long.
- MD 929E is the designation for a portion of Gracefield Road running from the beginning of state maintenance north to a dead end in Fairland. The route is 0.04 mi (0.064 km) long.
- MD 929F is the designation for Dustin Road at the interchange with US 29 in Burtonsville. The route is 0.10 mi (0.16 km) long.

Browse numbered routes
← MD 928	→ MD 931

== MD 931 ==
Maryland Route 931
- Location: Annapolis

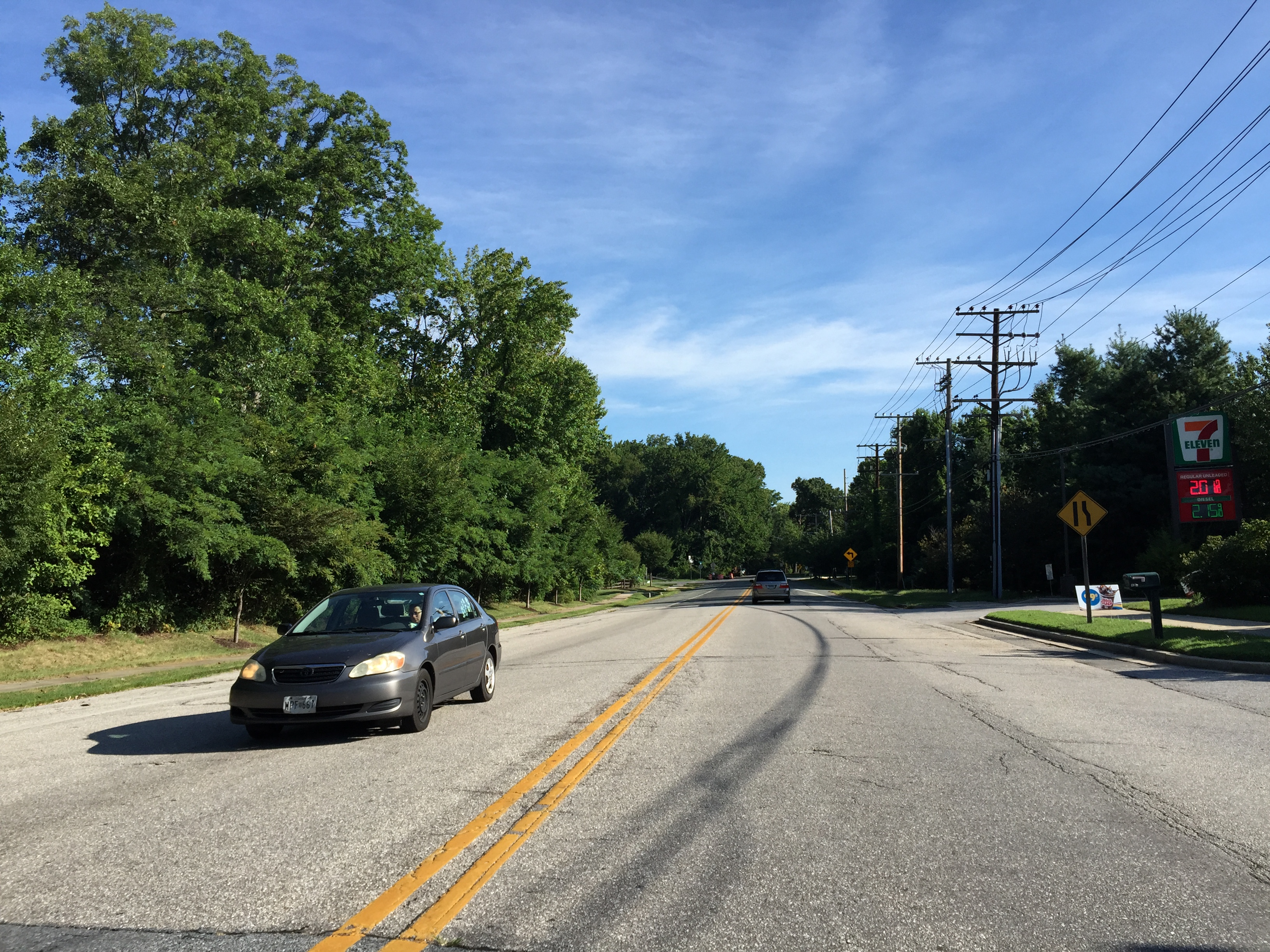
View north along MD 931R in Annapolis

Maryland Route 931 is the unsigned designation for five stretches of road near US 50/US 301 in Annapolis, Anne Arundel County:

- MD 931L runs along a portion of Holly Drive from the beginning of state maintenance north to MD 179. The route is 0.11 mi (0.18 km) long.
- MD 931Q runs along a portion of College Parkway from the beginning of state maintenance east to MD 931R, crossing MD 179. The route is 0.38 mi (0.61 km) long.
- MD 931R runs along a portion of East College Parkway from MD 908B north to MD 931Q. The route is 0.15 mi (0.24 km) long.
- MD 931U runs along a short portion of Woodland Circle from MD 179 east to the end of state maintenance. The route is 0.01 mi (0.016 km) long.
- MD 931Y runs along a short portion of Hollybeach Farm Road from the beginning of state maintenance north to MD 908C. The route is 0.04 mi (0.064 km) long.

Browse numbered routes
← MD 929	→ MD 932

== MD 932 ==
Maryland Route 932
- Location: Glenelg

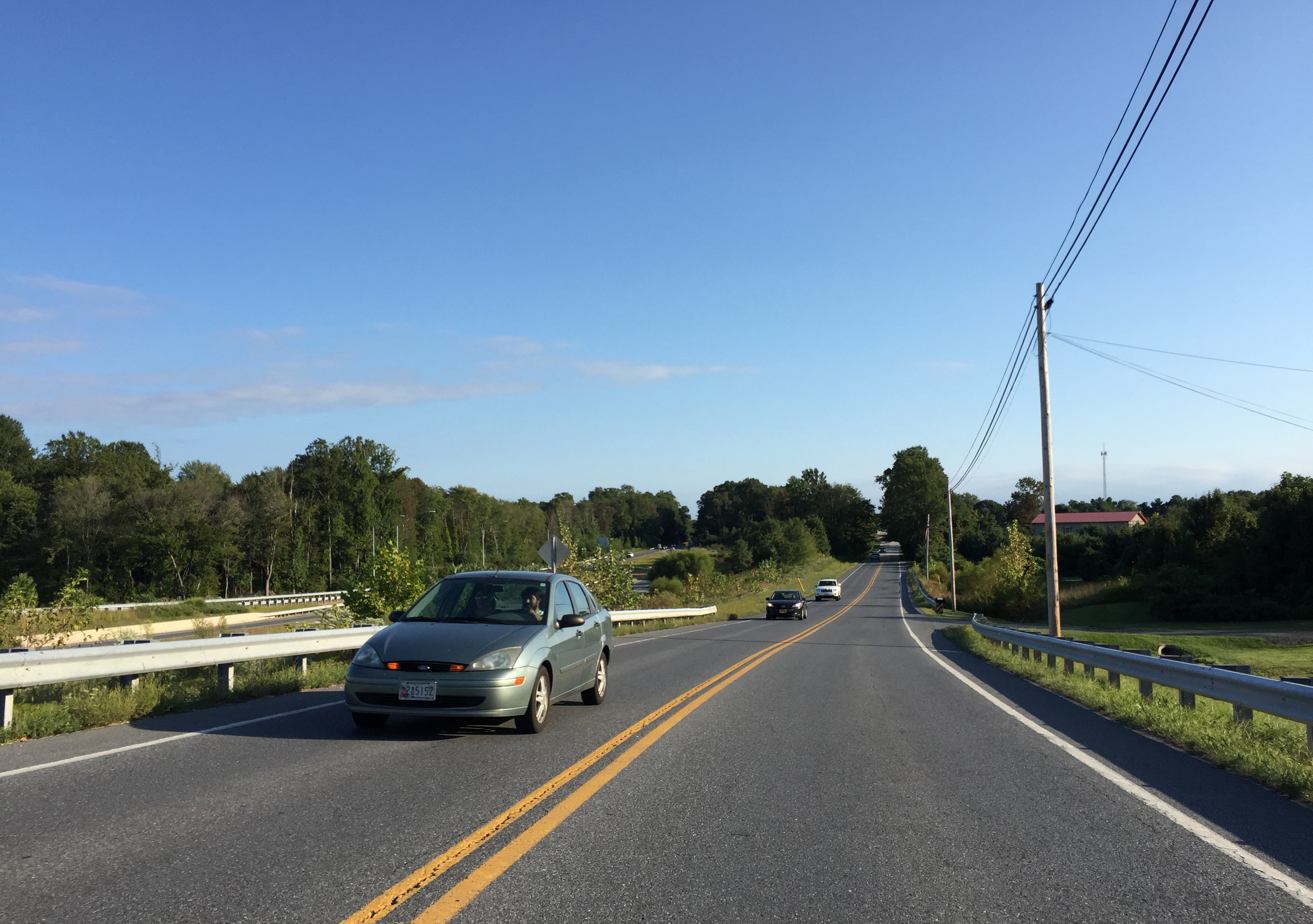
View south along MD 932C in Glenwood

Maryland Route 932 is the unsigned designation for six stretches of road near MD 32 near Glenelg, Howard County:

- MD 932B runs along a portion of Burntwoods Road from the beginning of state maintenance east to East Ivory Road, interchanging with MD 32. The route is 0.46 mi (0.74 km) long.
- MD 932C runs along Ten Oaks Road from the beginning of state maintenance north to an interchange with MD 32. The route is 0.55 mi (0.89 km) long.
- MD 932D runs along a portion of Ivory Road from the beginning of state maintenance north to MD 932C. The route is 0.07 mi (0.11 km) long.
- MD 932E runs along a portion of Pfefferkorn Road from MD 932C north to the end of state maintenance. The route is 0.10 mi (0.16 km) long.
- MD 932F runs along Linden Church Road between Ten Oaks Road and MD 932G (Greenberry Lane)/Broadwater Lane, where Linden Church Road continues east as a county road. The road interchanges with MD 32 with a pair of roundabouts at the intersections with the ramps. The route is 0.25 mi (0.40 km) long and was designated in 2013.
- MD 932G runs along Greenberry Lane from MD 932F (Linden Church Road), where the road continues south as Broadwater Lane, north to the road end at a private road. The route is 0.16 mi (0.26 km) long and was designated in 2013.

Browse numbered routes
← MD 931	→ MD 935

== MD 939 ==
Maryland Route 939
- Location: Barton
- Length: 0.01 mi (16 m)

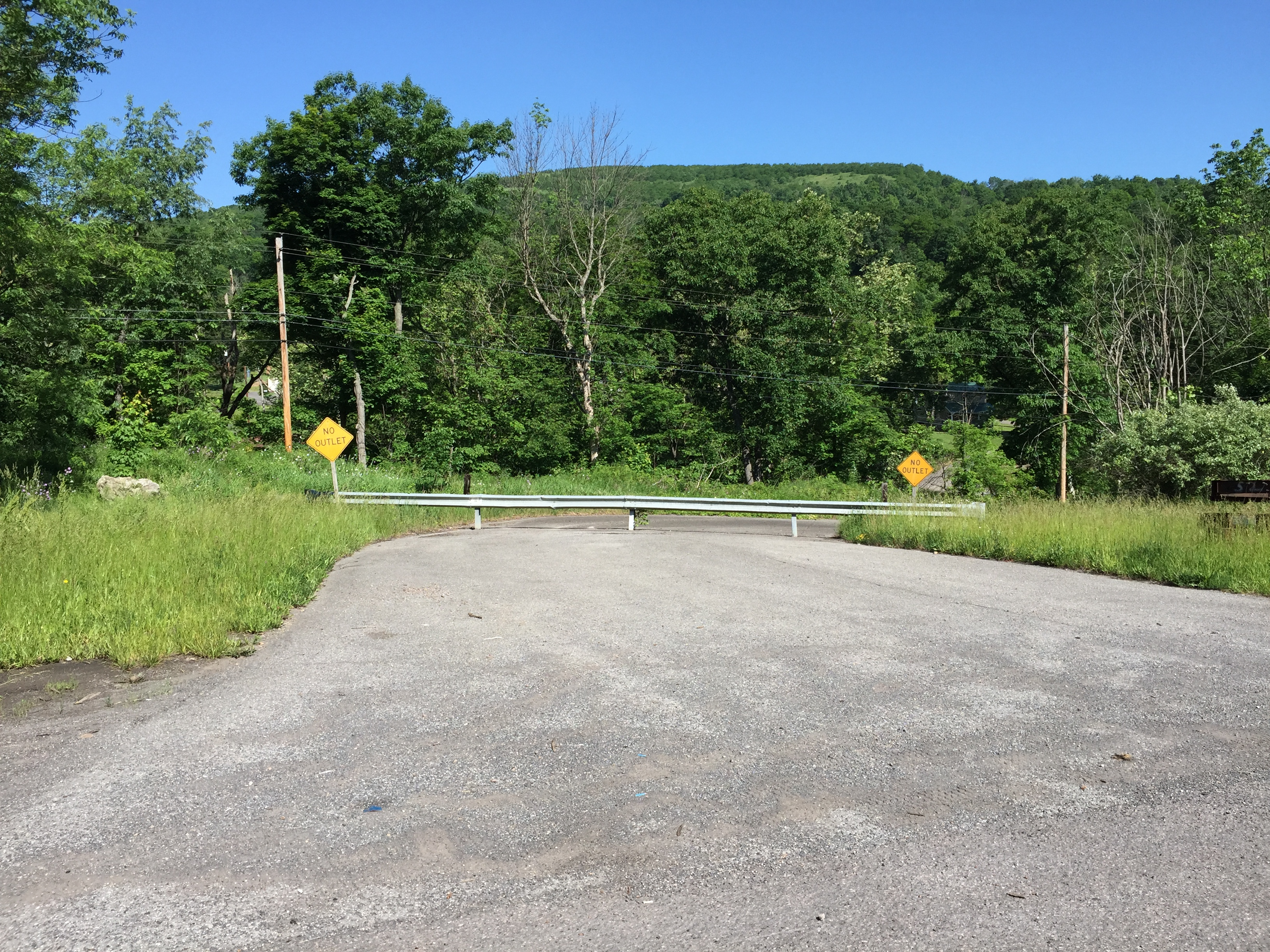
MD 939 at MD 36 in Barton

Maryland Route 939 is the unsigned designation for an unnamed 0.01-mile (0.016 km) spur on the southbound side of MD 36 just south of Barton. It, along with Routes 963 and 990, are the shortest state highways in the United States.

Browse numbered routes
← MD 937	→ MD 940

== MD 942 ==
Maryland Route 942
- Location: Cumberland
- Length: 0.06 mi (97 m)

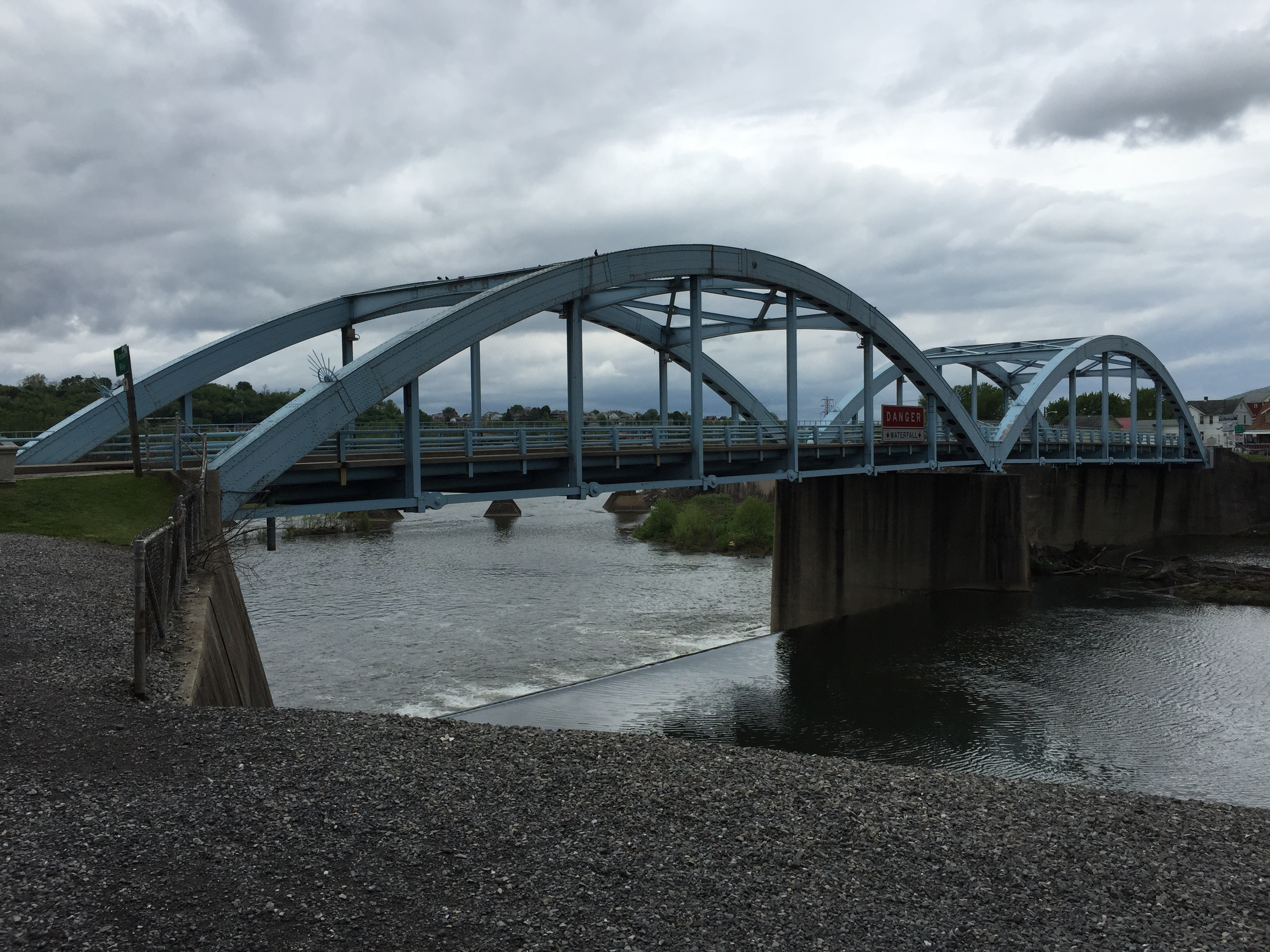
View of MD 942 from Cumberland

Maryland Route 942 is the unsigned designation for the 0.06-mile (0.097 km) section of Bridge Street comprising the Blue Bridge, a steel through arch bridge across the North Branch Potomac River in Cumberland. The 1953 bridge connects Greene Street in Cumberland with the northern terminus of West Virginia Route 28 Alternate in Ridgeley.

Browse numbered routes
← MD 940	→ MD 943

== MD 943 ==
Maryland Route 943
- Location: Cockeysville
- Length: 0.59 mi (950 m)

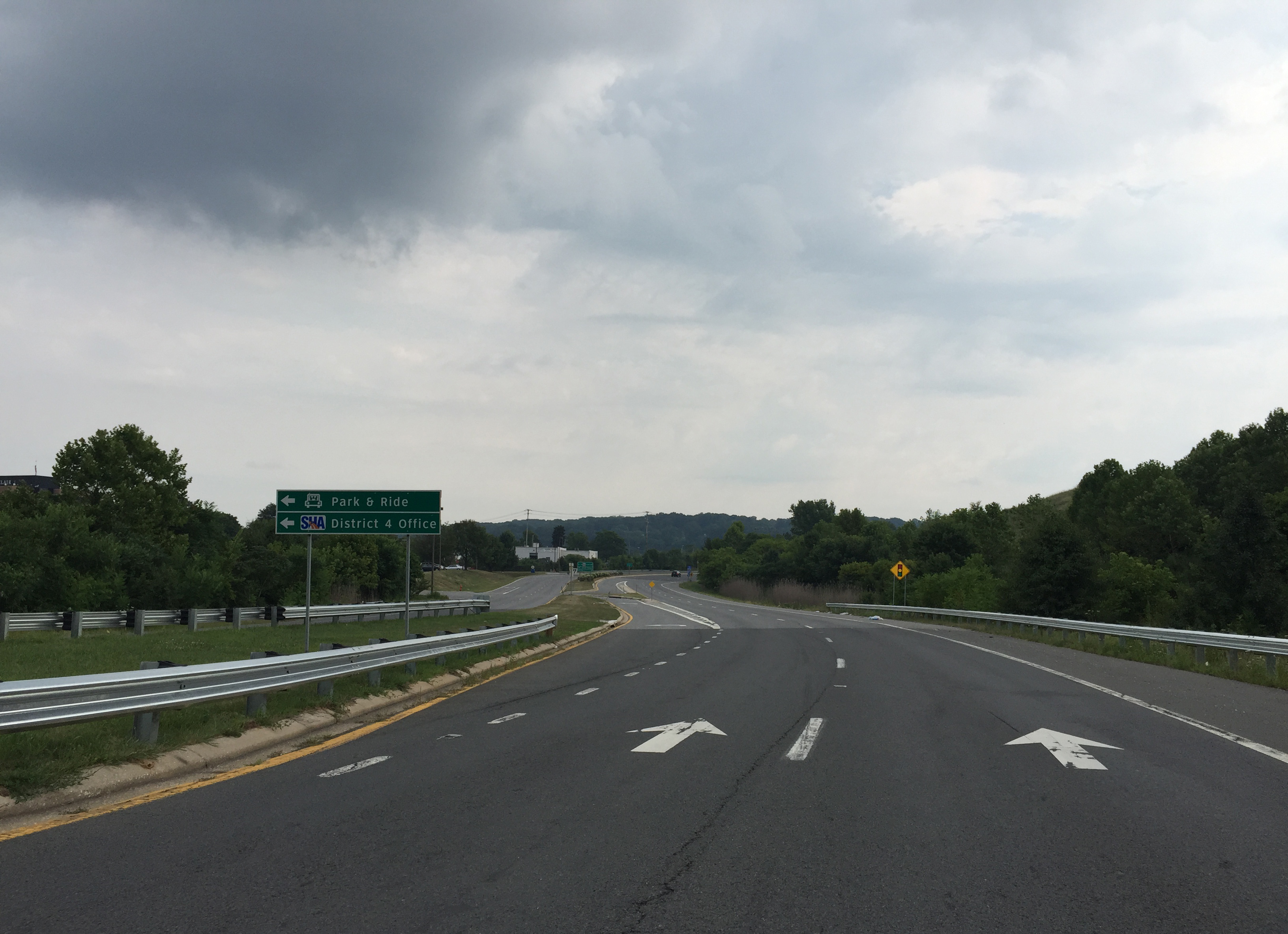
View northeast along MD 943 in Cockeysville

Maryland Route 943 is the unsigned designation for a 0.59-mile (0.95 km) section of Warren Road between I-83 Exit 18 and Beaver Dam Road in Cockeysville. The state highway, whose western terminus consists of ramps to and from I-83 in the direction of Baltimore, provides access to a park and ride facility for the Warren Road station of MTA Maryland's Baltimore Light RailLink.

Browse numbered routes
← MD 942	→ MD 944

== MD 945 ==
Maryland Route 945
- Location: Hollywood
- Length: 0.10 mi (160 m)

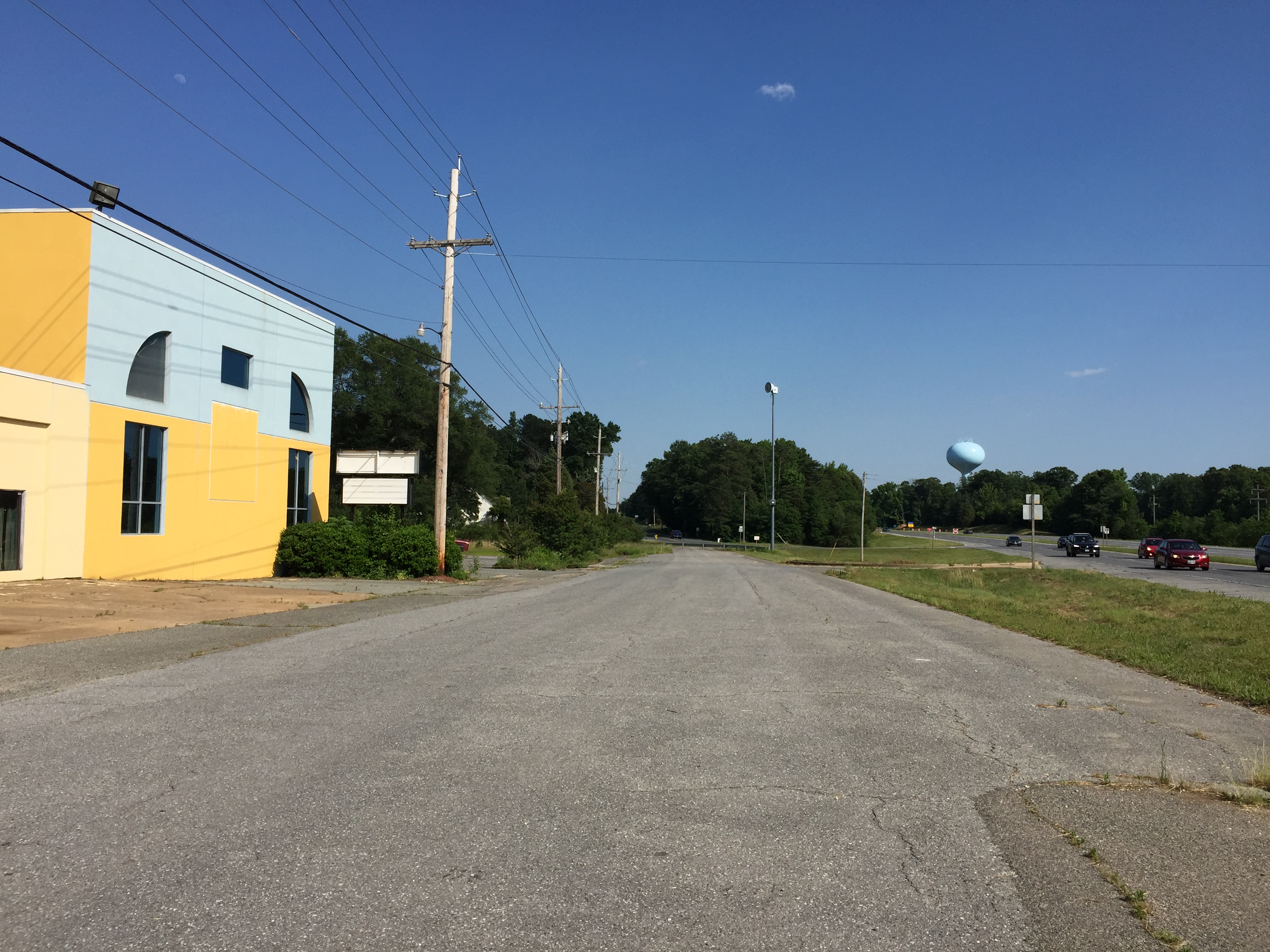
MD 945 in Hollywood

Maryland Route 945 is the unsigned designation for Old MD 235, a 0.10-mile (0.16 km) section of old alignment of MD 235 immediately north of MD 235's northern intersection with MD 944 in Hollywood.

Browse numbered routes
← MD 944	→ MD 946

== MD 946 ==
Maryland Route 946
- Location: Finzel
- Length: 0.61 mi (980 m)

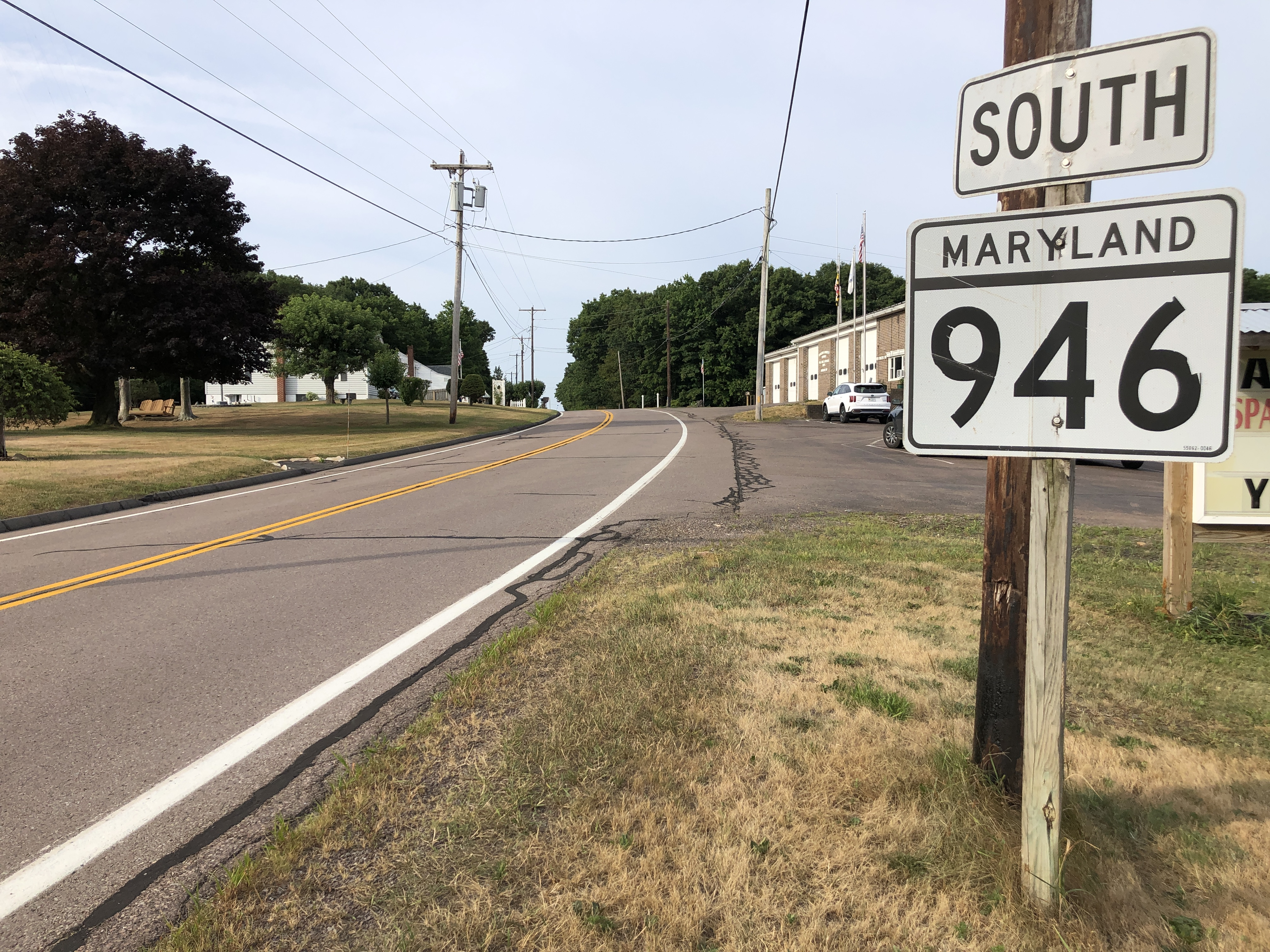
View south along MD 946 at MD 546 in Finzel

Maryland Route 946 is the designation for the old alignment of MD 546. Also known as Finzel Road, the state highway runs 0.61 mi (0.98 km) from US 40 Alternate north to MD 546 in Finzel.

Browse numbered routes
← MD 945	→ MD 948

== MD 948 ==
Maryland Route 948
- Location: Garrett County, Allegany County

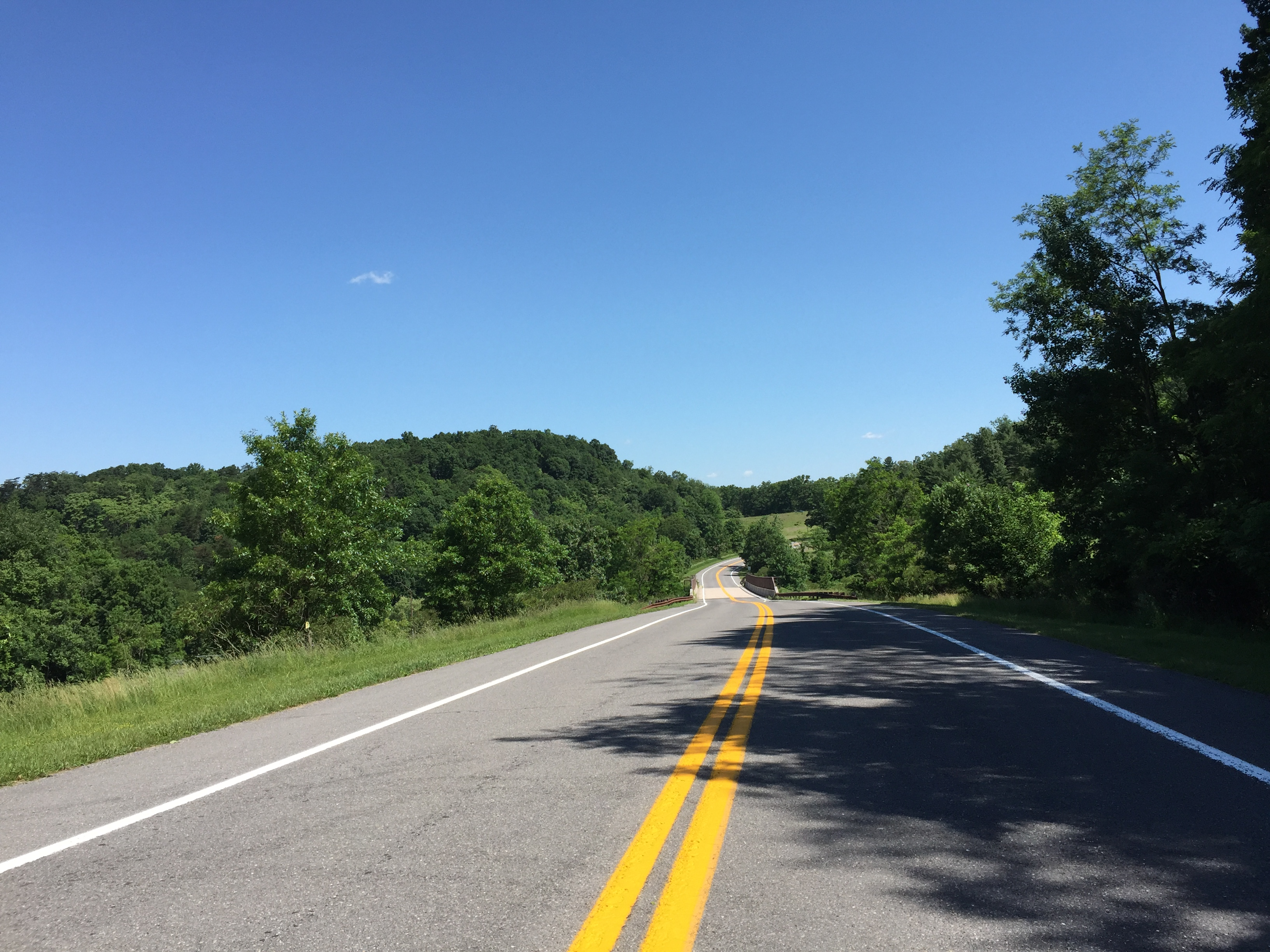
View north along MD 948AF past I-68/US 40 in Allegany County

Maryland Route 948 is a collection of 16 unsigned state highways that are service roads, state-maintained portions of county highways, and connectors in the vicinity of I-68 in Garrett County and Allegany County. MD 948BA, 948D, 948H, and 948K are located in Garrett County. The remaining 12 sections of MD 948 are in Allegany County between Cumberland and the Washington County line.

- MD 948AD is the designation for a 0.20-mile (0.32 km) section of Pleasant Valley Road between MD 144 (National Pike) and the entrance to Rocky Gap State Park west of Flintstone. The state highway meets I-68 at Exit 50.
- MD 948AE is the designation for a 0.18-mile (0.29 km) section of Rocky Gap Road at its overpass of I-68 and its eastern terminus at MD 144 east of Cumberland.
- MD 948AF is the designation for a 0.29-mile (0.47 km) section of Jeffries Road at its overpass of I-68 east of Cumberland.
- MD 948AL is the designation for a 0.49-mile (0.79 km) section of M.V. Smith Road around its interchange with I-68 east of Flintstone within Green Ridge State Forest. M.V. Smith Road meets I-68 at Exit 64.
- MD 948AM is the designation for Flintstone Drive, a 0.61-mile (0.98 km) service road in Flintstone between a private driveway and the intersection of Flintstone Creek Road and Black Valley Road, which heads south from the four-way intersection as MD 948AO. MD 948AM provides access to the Exit 56 ramps to and from westbound I-68.
- MD 948AO is the designation for a 0.31-mile (0.50 km) section of Black Valley Road between MD 144 (Old National Pike) and MD 948AM (Flintstone Drive) in Flintstone.
- MD 948AP is the designation for Tensor Lane, a 0.115-mile (0.185 km) road running from MD 144 north to a private road, crossing over I-68 on an overpass. The route was designated in 2013.
- MD 948AQ is the designation for Beautiful Plains Road, a 0.185-mile (0.298 km) road that runs from Old Adams Road west to a SHA maintenance facility in Allegany County. The route was designated in 2016.
- MD 948B was the designation for a 0.24-mile (0.39 km) section of Old Frostburg Road at its overpass of I-68 west of Finzel. MD 948B was removed from the state highway system in 2015 and transferred to county maintenance.
- MD 948BA is the designation for Ellis Road, a 0.684-mile (1.101 km) road that runs from US 219J north to the end of state maintenance in Garrett County. The route was designated in 2016.
- MD 948C is the designation for Sunset Orchard Road, a 0.39-mile (0.63 km) highway that leads to a group of communications towers west of Flintstone. The state highway begins at MD 144 just west of I-68 Exit 52 and spins off a long, two-way spur that leads to an entrance ramp to westbound I-68.
- MD 948D is the designation for a 0.42-mile (0.68 km) section of Lower New Germany Road that runs from Avilton Lonanconing Road north to an intersection with US 40 Alternate, intersecting I-68 at Exit 24. The route was designated in 2015.
- MD 948H is the designation for Diesel School Road, a 0.62-mile (1.00 km) service road east from US 219 just south of I-68 Exit 14 in Keyser's Ridge.
- MD 948K is the designation for an unnamed 0.40-mile (0.64 km) service road that heads west from Pigs Ear Road west of Keyser's Ridge.
- MD 948M is the designation for a 0.44-mile (0.71 km) section of West Wilson Road between Street Road and MD 144 west of Flintstone.
- MD 948Y is the designation for a 0.37-mile (0.60 km) section of High Germany Road from US 40 Scenic north to the Washington County line at Sideling Hill Creek near Little Orleans. MD 948Y meets I-68 at Exit 72.
- MD 948Z is the designation for a 0.80-mile (1.29 km) section of Orleans Road running from the end of state maintenance at the Open Plains Road intersection north to US 40 Scenic. The road has an interchange with I-68 at Exit 68. The route was designated in 2013.

Browse numbered routes
← MD 946	→ MD 949

== MD 949 ==
Maryland Route 949
- Location: La Vale
- Length: 0.56 mi (900 m)

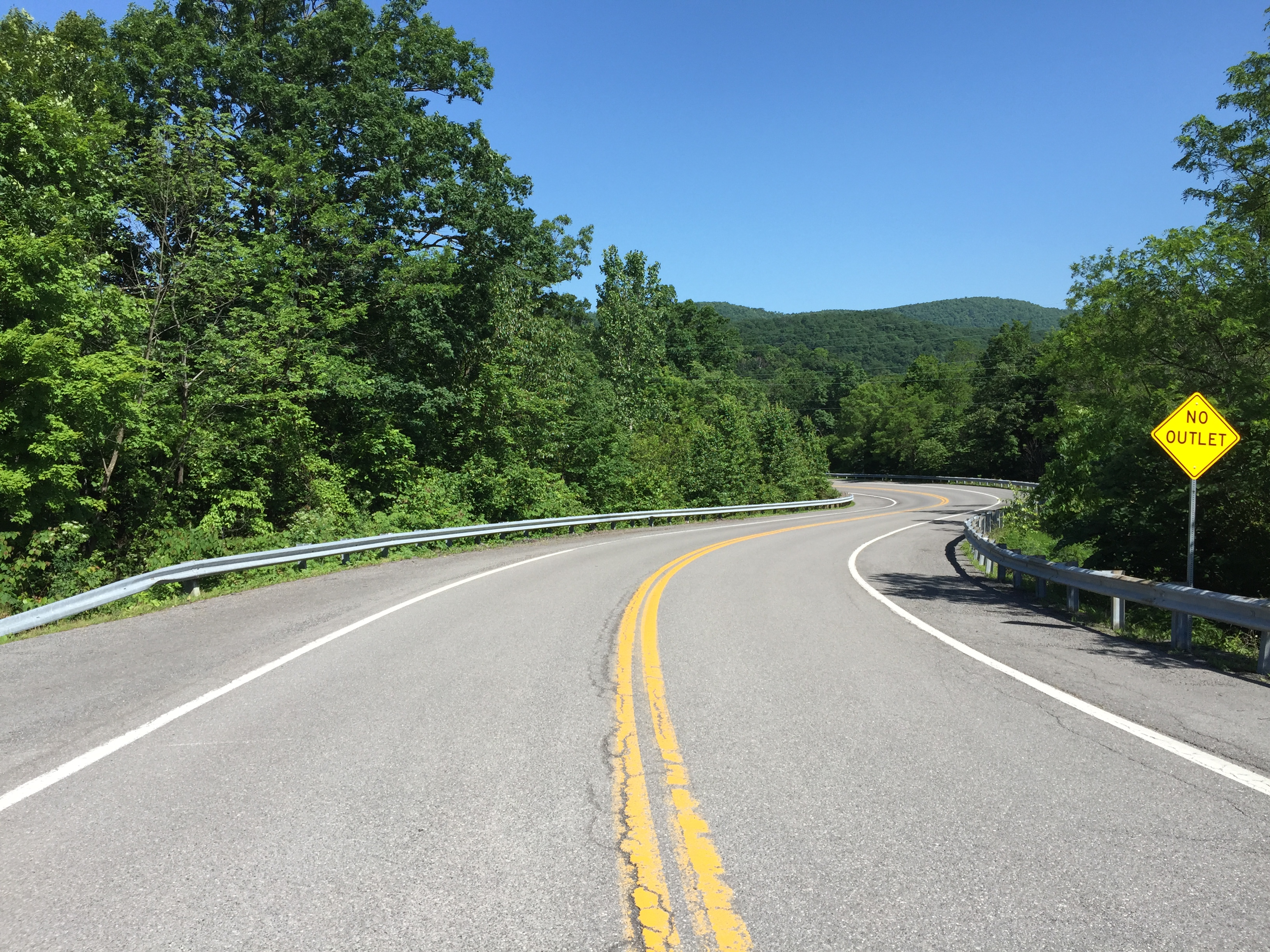
View west along MD 949 at MD 658 in La Vale

Maryland Route 949 is the unsigned designation for a segment of MD 49 that remains from that state highway being truncated following the construction of I-68 through La Vale in the 1970s. The spur, named West Braddock Road, runs 0.56 mi (0.90 km) from MD 658 northwest to a dead end adjacent to the entrance ramp from MD 53 to I-68 east.

- MD 949A is the unsigned designation for another segment of former MD 49 that serves as a parking lot for businesses at a shopping center just southeast of MD 53's intersection with US 40 Alternate. This spur runs 0.12 mi (0.19 km) from MD 53 to a dead end on the north side of I-68, opposite the northern terminus of MD 949.

Browse numbered routes
← MD 948	→ MD 950

== MD 950 ==
Maryland Route 950
- Location: New Carrollton
- Length: 0.22 mi (350 m)

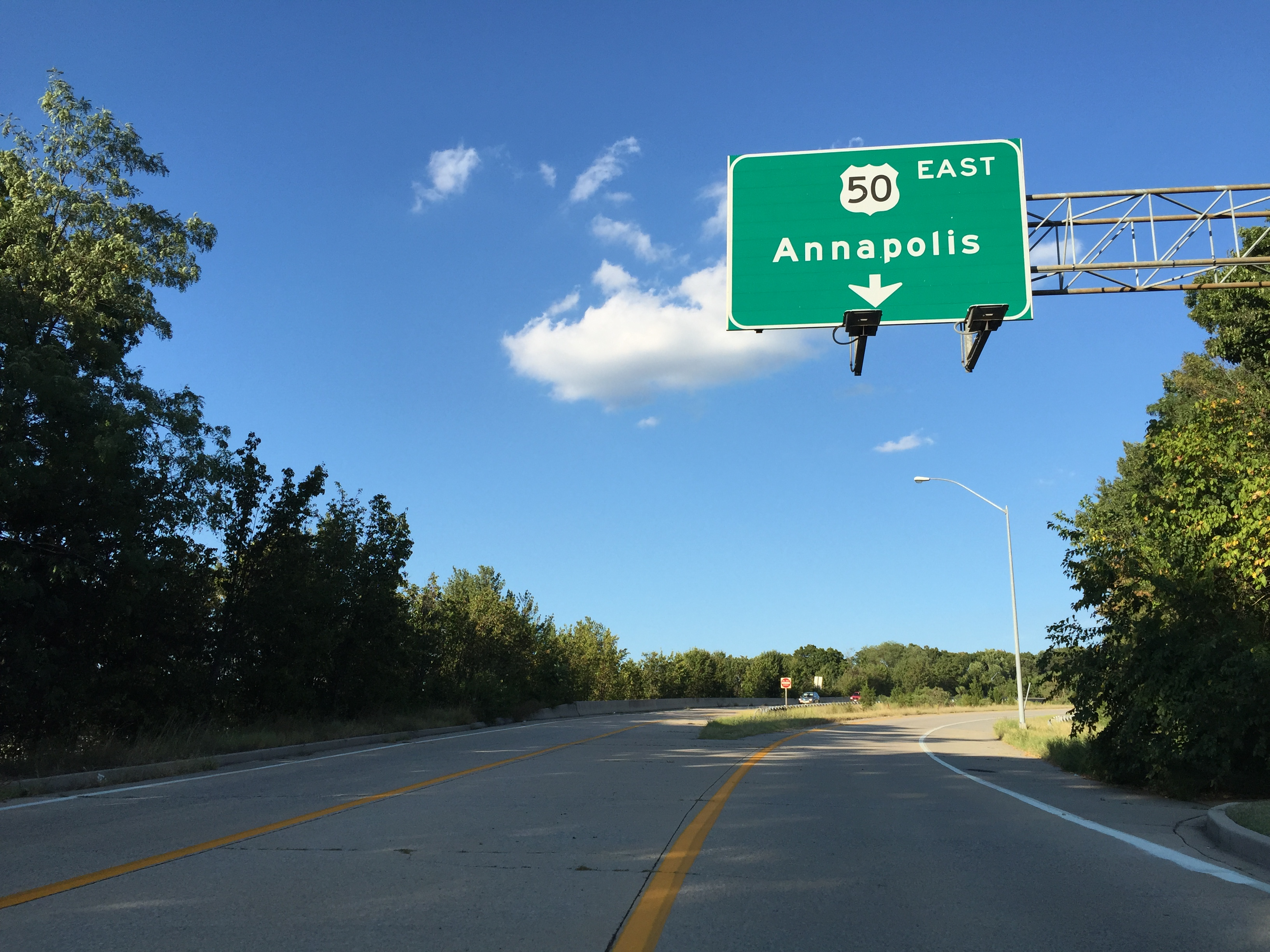
Ramp to US 50 east at the north end of MD 950 in New Carrollton

Maryland Route 950 is the unsigned designation for Garden City Drive, which connects county-maintained Garden City Drive with the ramps to and from US 50 (the John Hanson Highway) in New Carrollton, Prince George's County. This road fronts the New Carrollton station, which serves Amtrak's Northeast Corridor, MARC's Penn Line, and Washington Metro's Orange Line. MD 950 is approximately 0.22 miles (0.35 km) long, and is aligned in a north–south direction.

There are other separate segments of Maryland Route 950:

- MD 950A (Whitfield Chapel Road) connects county-maintained Whitfield Chapel Road near 91st Place with county-maintained Whitfield Chapel Road near Ebenezer Lane. It is approximately 0.28 miles (0.45 km) long and is aligned in a north–south direction.
- MD 950C (Lottsford Vista Road) connects Lottsford Vista Road with Lottsford Vista Road and Cleary Lane. It is approximately 0.42 miles (0.68 km) long and is aligned in a north–south direction.
- MD 950D (Church Road) is a state-maintained segment within the otherwise county-maintained Church Road. It is approximately 0.34 miles (0.55 km) long and is aligned in a north–south direction.

Browse numbered routes
← MD 949	→ MD 951

== MD 951 ==
Maryland Route 951
- Location: Cresaptown
- Length: 0.23 mi (370 m)

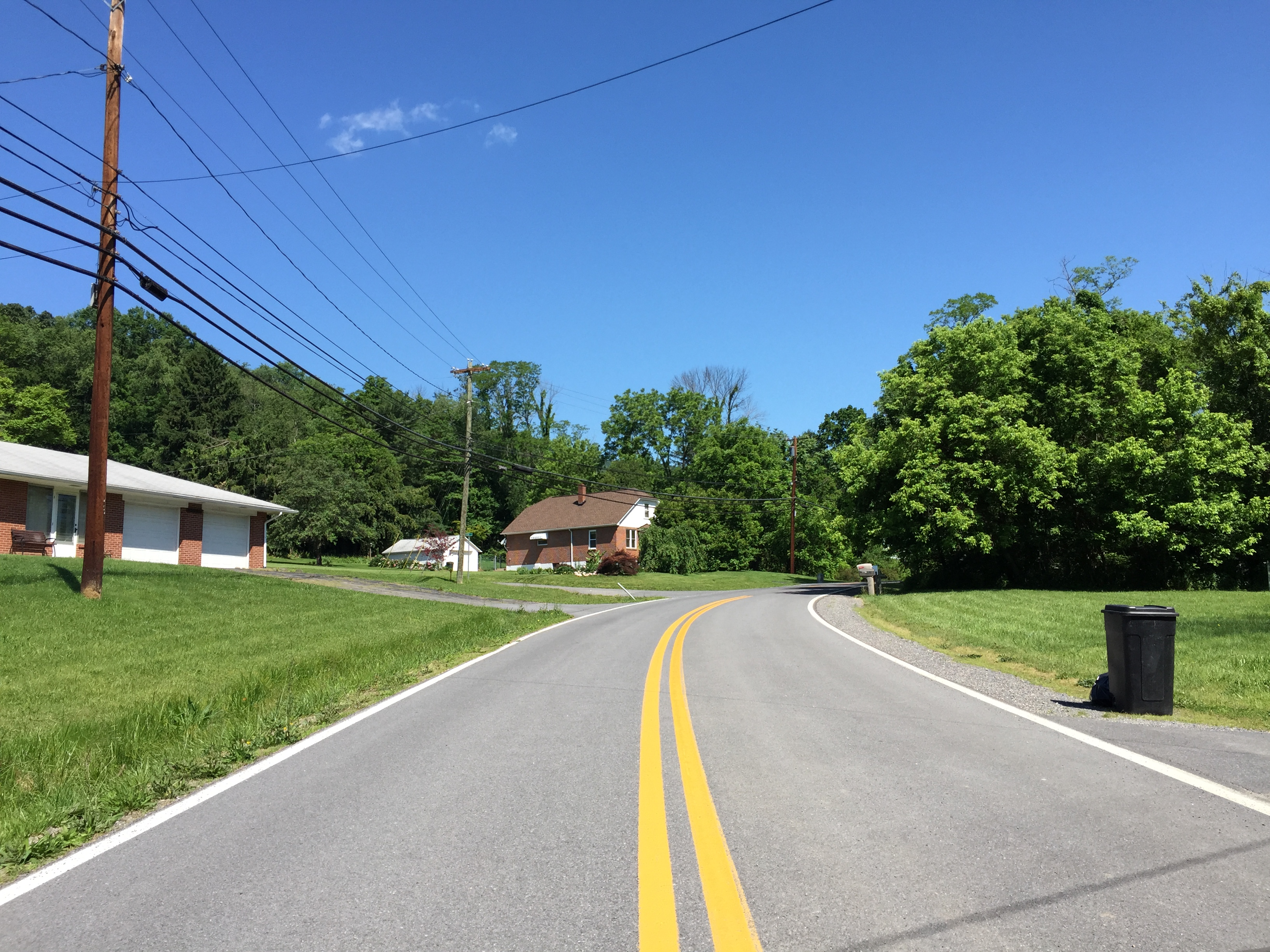
View north at the south end of MD 951 in Cresaptown

Maryland Route 951 is the unsigned designation for Old Cresaptown Road, an old alignment of MD 53 that runs 0.23 miles (0.37 km) north–south between two intersections with MD 53 in Cresaptown. The state highway got bypassed when MD 53 was rebuilt between 1953 and 1956.

Browse numbered routes
← MD 950	→ MD 952

== MD 952 ==
Maryland Route 952
- Location: Cumberland

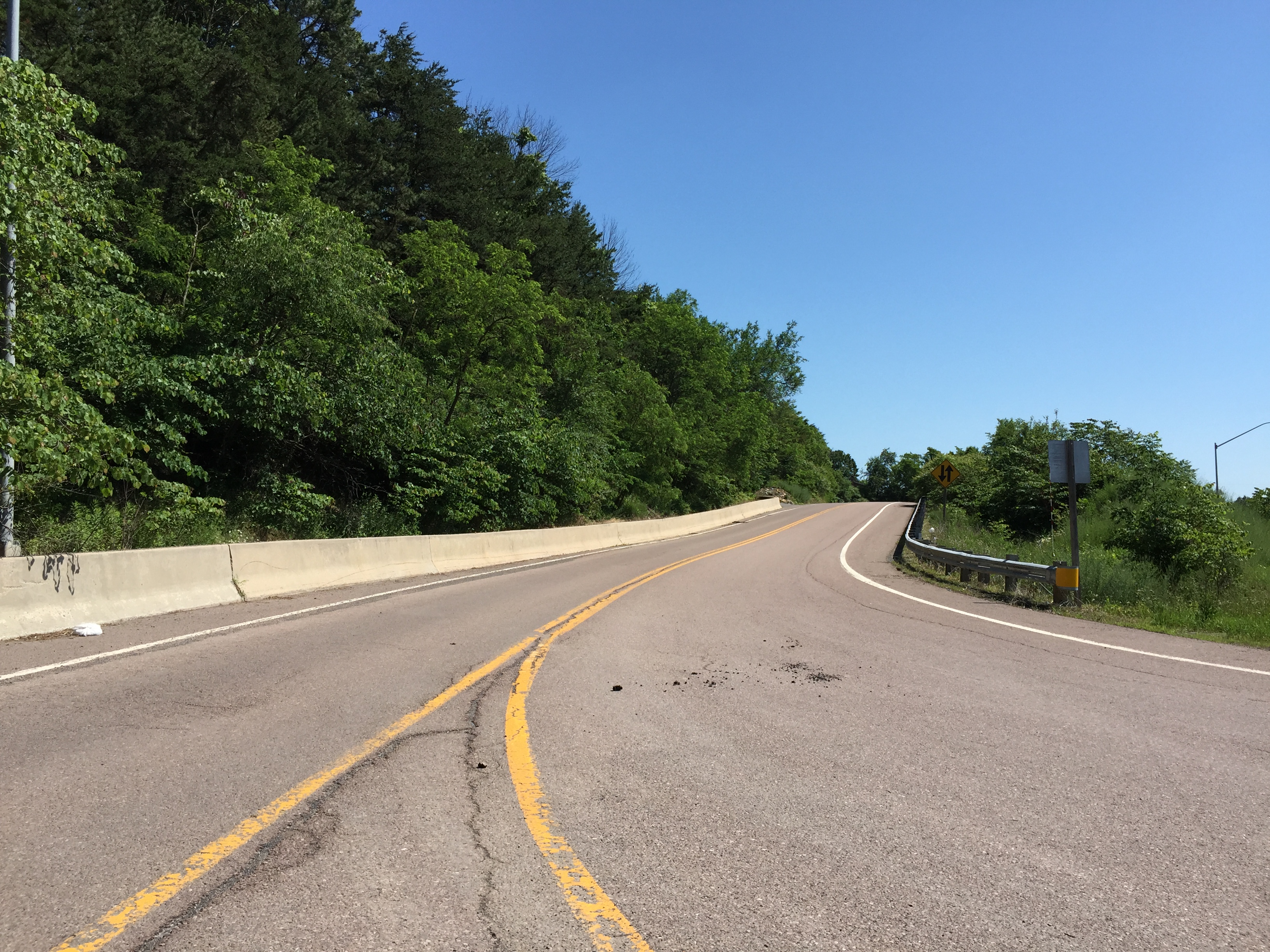
View east at the west end of MD 952 at I-68/US 40/US 220 in Cumberland

Maryland Route 952 is the unsigned designation for Hillcrest Drive, a 0.31-mile (0.50 km) C-shaped highway that connects a pair of right-in/right-out interchanges with each other on opposite sides of Exit 45 of I-68 in Cumberland.

- MD 952A is the designation for Rannells Road, a 0.18-mile (0.29 km) service road that parallels the eastbound direction of I-68 north from an intersection with MD 952. In 2012, the road was shortened by 0.18 miles (0.29 km) due to a "Private Driveway, Keep Out" sign.
- MD 952B is the designation for an 0.05-mile (0.080 km) unnamed road which runs from MD 952/MD 952A south to the end of state maintenance. The route was designated in 2012.

Browse numbered routes
← MD 951	→ MD 953

== MD 954 ==
Maryland Route 954
- Location: Talbot County

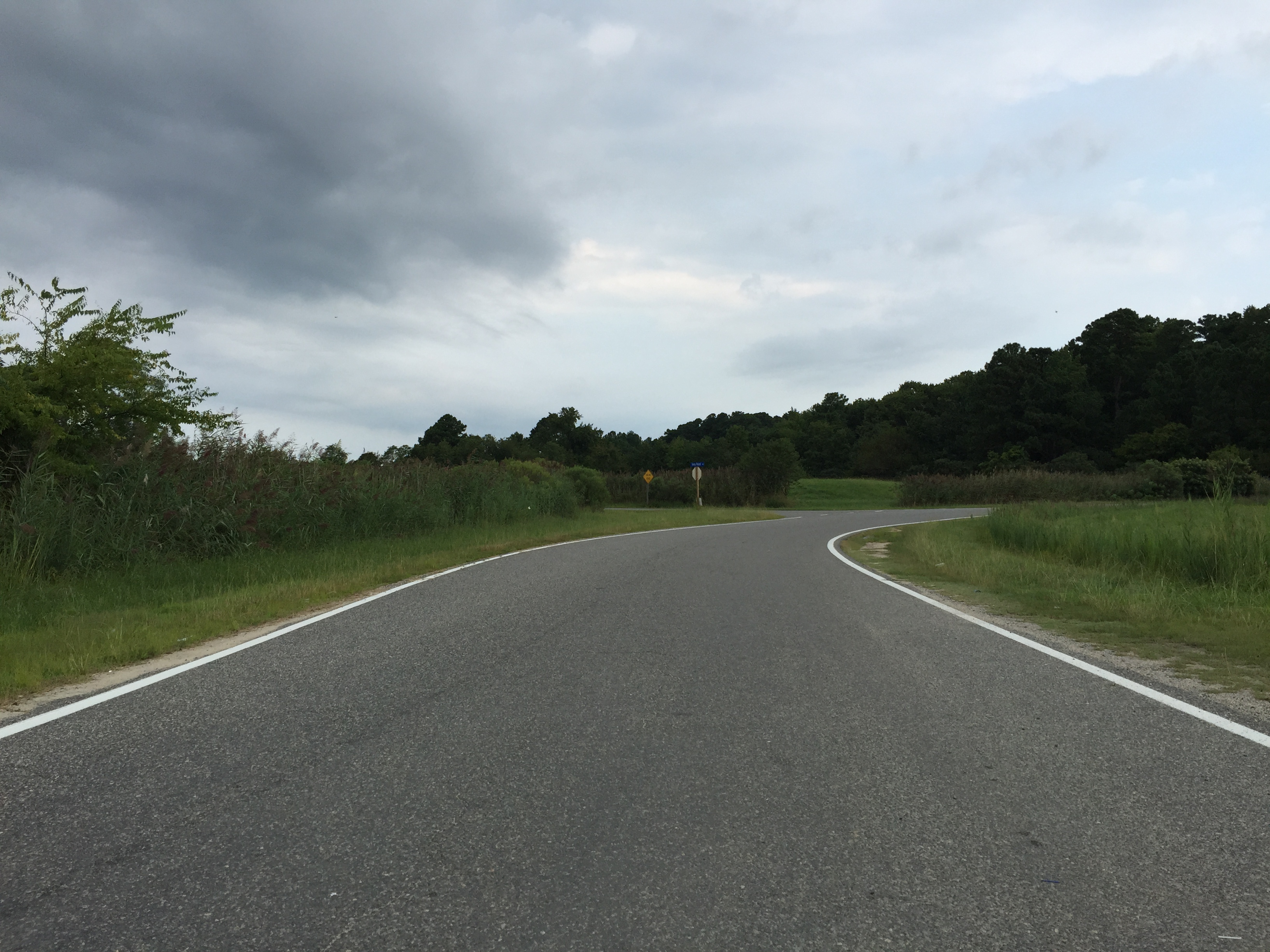
MD 954A in Talbot County

Maryland Route 954 is the unsigned designation for three roads in southern Talbot County at the northern end of the U.S. Route 50 bridge over the Choptank River:

- MD 954A is the designation of Marina Drive, which runs from US 50 to a dead end at a marina along the Choptank River. The route is 0.20 miles (0.32 km) long.
- MD 954B is the designation for Ferry Point Drive, which runs from MD 954A west to Ferry Point Court. The route is 0.05 miles (0.080 km) long.
- MD 954C runs from MD 954A to a dead end. The route is 0.02 miles (0.032 km) long.

Browse numbered routes
← MD 953	→ MD 956

== MD 956 ==
Maryland Route 956
- Location: Pinto
- Length: 0.53 mi (850 m)

Maryland Route 956 is a 0.53-mile (0.85 km) state highway in Pinto in central Allegany County. Known as Patriot Parkway, the two-lane highway begins at US 220, crosses CSX's Mountain Subdivision, and reaches its eastern terminus at the West Virginia state line at the North Branch Potomac River, where the highway continues as West Virginia Route 956 (WV 956) through Rocket Center. After passing the entrance to the Allegany Ballistics Laboratory, WV 956 crosses Knobly Mountain and meets WV 28 at Short Gap. MD 956 is the highest numbered signed route in the Maryland state highway system.

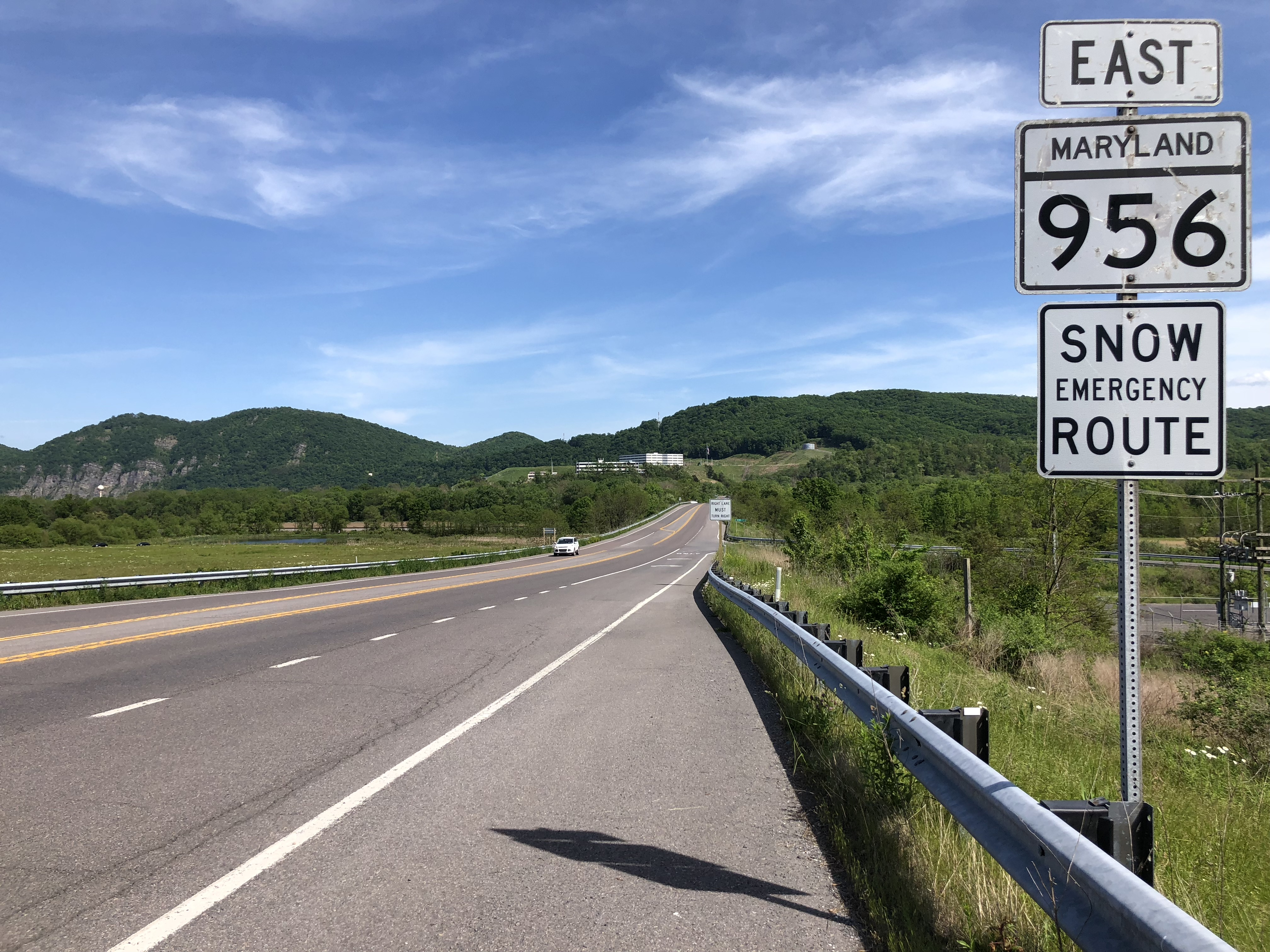
View east along MD 956 in Pinto

The Winchester Road was a highway first blazed in the Colonial era to connect Cumberland with Winchester, Virginia. The old road, whose northernmost part is now MD 53, crossed the North Branch Potomac River at Pinto. A bridge over the river connecting Pinto with the Allegany Ballistics Laboratory remained as late as 1950. The road crossed the military installation and ascended Knobly Mountain, meeting present-day WV 956 just west of WV 28. The bridge was removed at a later date. In 1967, a new highway featuring a crossing of a North Branch Potomac River was completed between US 220 and WV 28 to provide better access from Maryland to the government reservation and to WV 28. By 1985, the highway was signed as MD 956 and WV 956. MD 956 was designated Patriot Parkway in 2004.

Browse numbered routes
← MD 954	→ MD 958

== MD 958 ==
Maryland Route 958
- Location: Waterloo
- Length: 0.21 mi (340 m)

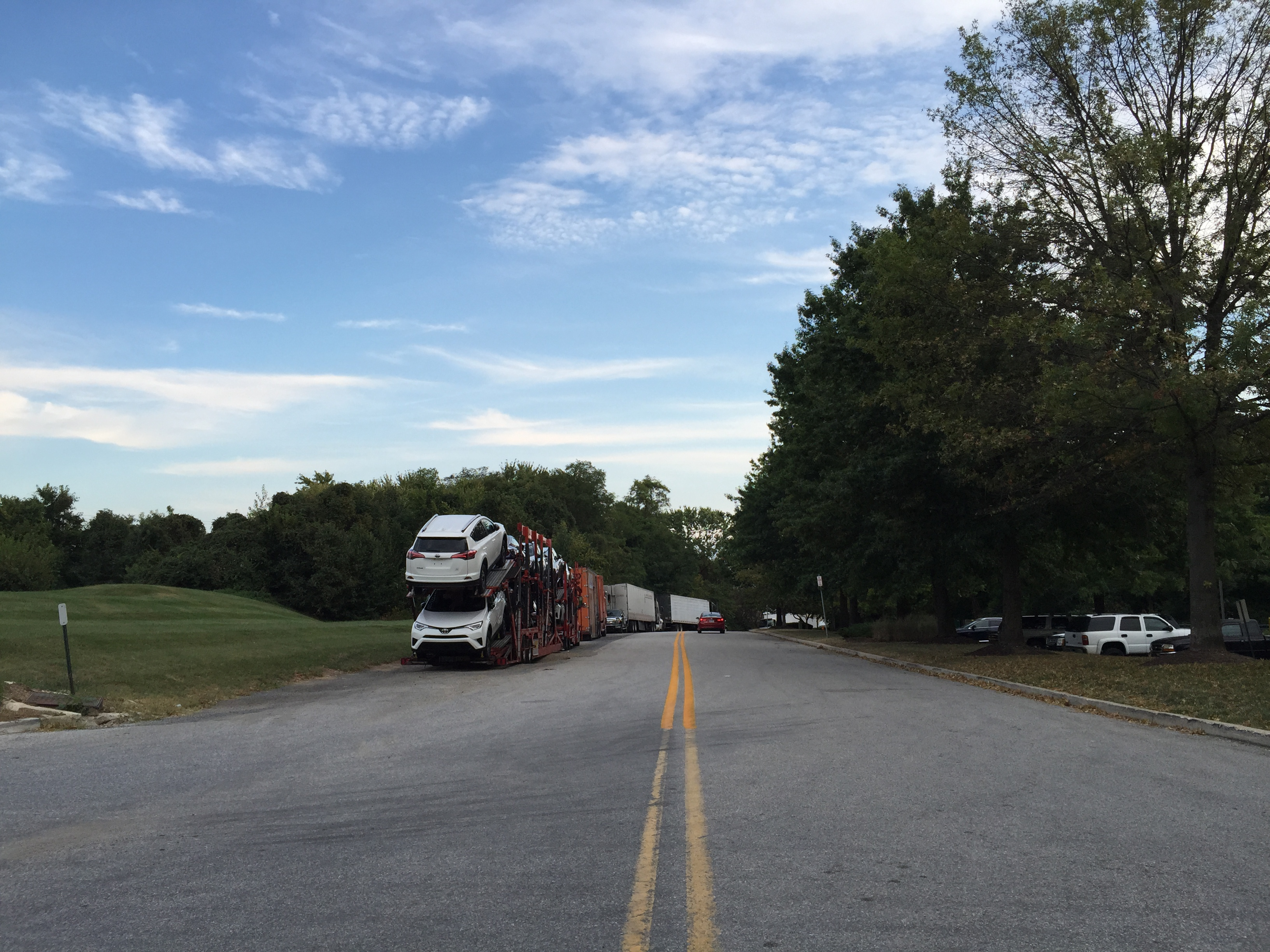
View south along MD 958 in Waterloo

Maryland Route 958P is the unsigned designation for Crestmount Road, running from US 1 north to a cul-de-sac in Waterloo, Howard County. The route is 0.21 mi (0.34 km) long.

Browse numbered routes
← MD 956	→ MD 963

== MD 963 ==
Maryland Route 963
- Location: Seat Pleasant
- Length: 0.01 mi (16 m)

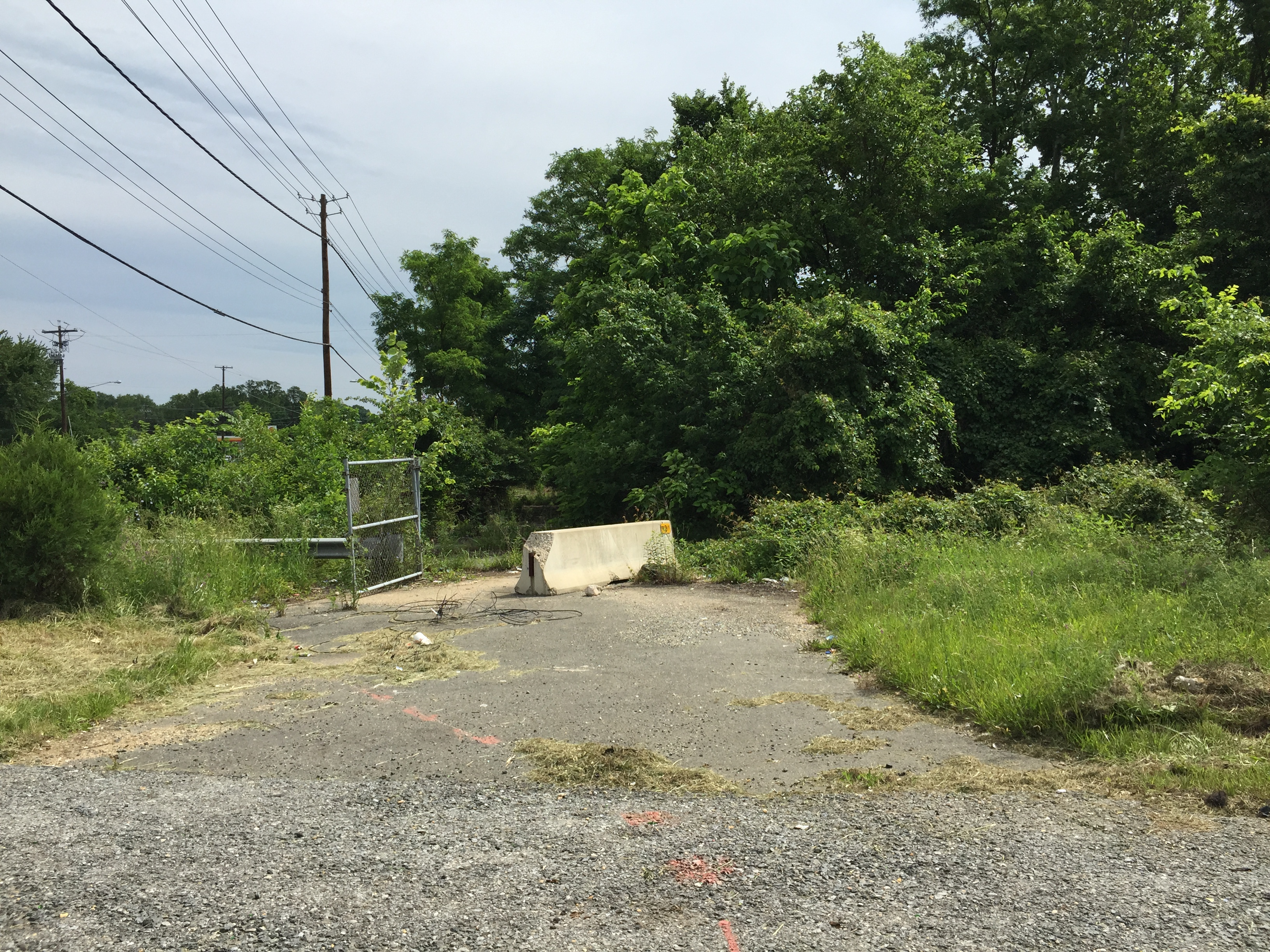
MD 963 in Prince George's County

Maryland Route 963 is the unsigned designation for Deputy Lane, a stub that intersects Hill Road and ends approximately 50 feet (15 m) east of the intersection, therefore providing a length of about 0.01 miles (0.016 km). It is located near Seat Pleasant in Prince George's County and is aligned in an east–west direction. It, along with Routes 939 and 990, are the shortest state highways in the United States.

Browse numbered routes
← MD 958	→ MD 964

== MD 964 ==
Maryland Route 964
- Location: Chillum
- Length: 0.10 mi (160 m)

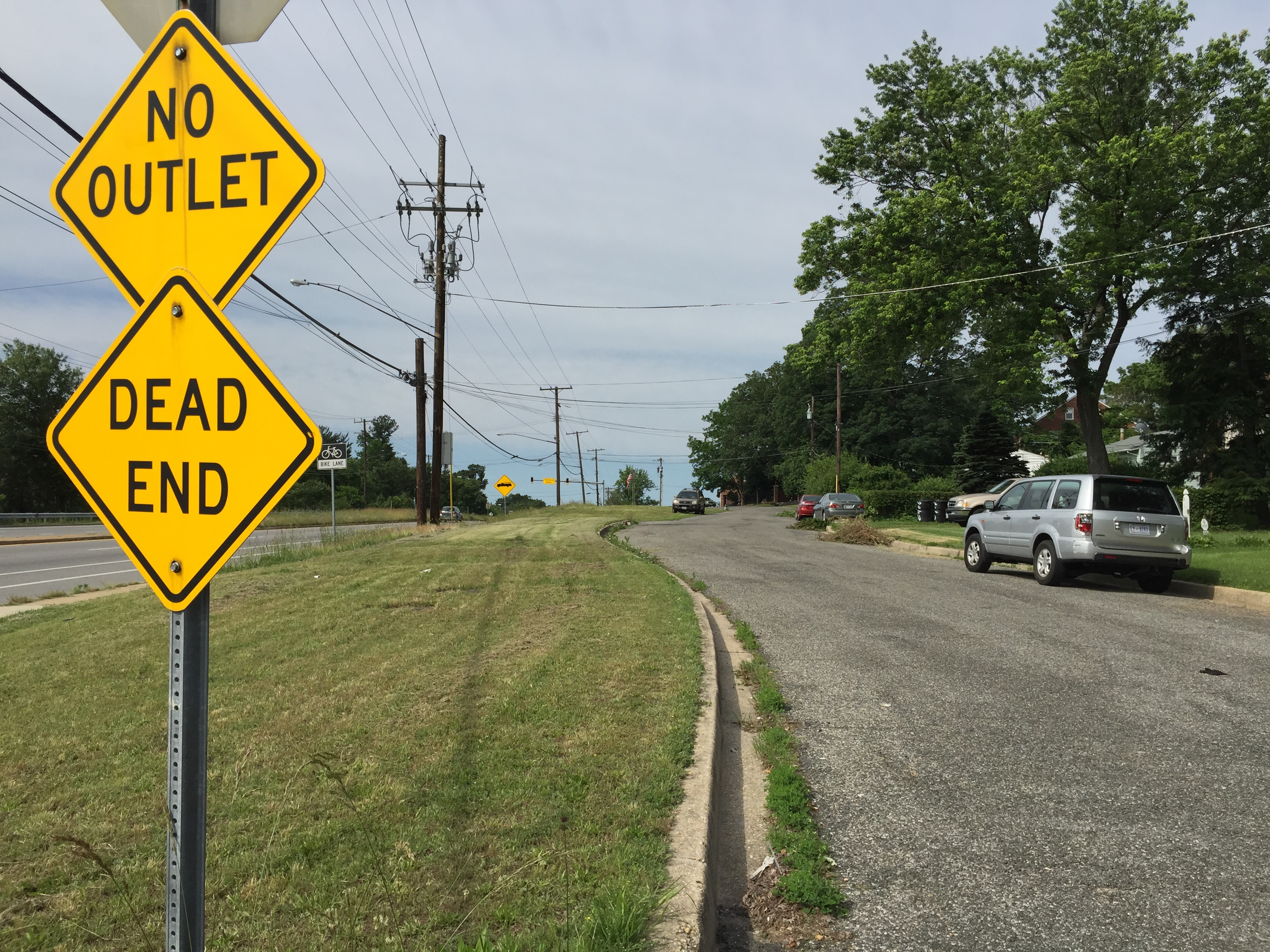
View south along MD 964 at Red Top Road in Prince George's County

Maryland Route 964 is the unsigned designation for Truman Road, which intersects Red Top Road and county-maintained Truman Road, ending the state-maintained segment approximately 500 feet (150 m) south of the intersection. It is located in Chillum in Prince George's County, is approximately 0.10 miles (0.16 km) long, and is aligned in a north–south direction.

Browse numbered routes
← MD 963	→ MD 965

== MD 965 ==
Maryland Route 965
- Location: Prince George's County
- Length: 0.24 mi (390 m)

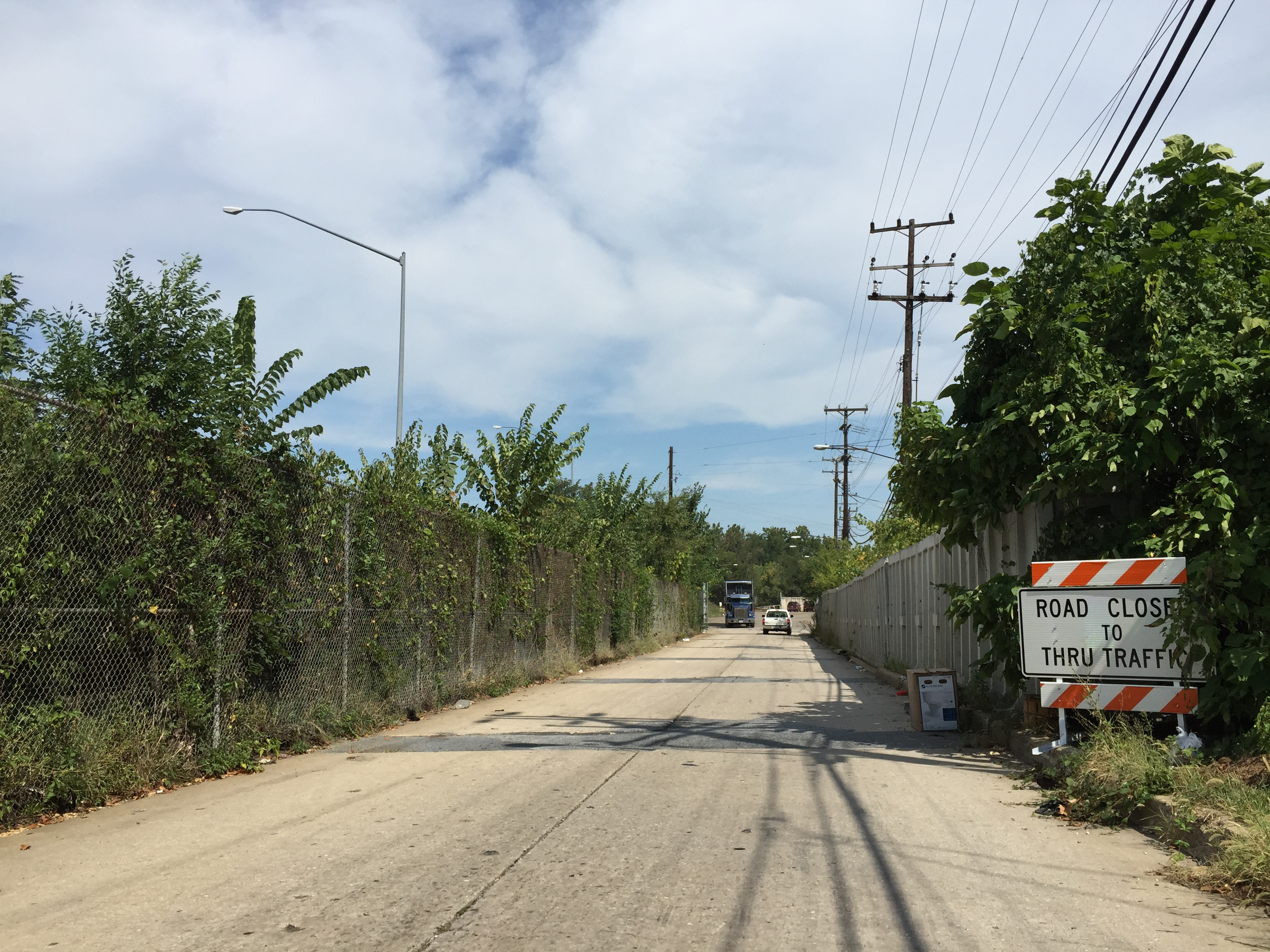
View north along MD 965 in Prince George's County

Maryland Route 965 is the unsigned designation for Kenilworth Avenue, which intersects the Washington, D.C. Line and ends approximately 50 feet (15 m) north of its intersection with S Street. It is located in Prince George's County, is approximately 0.24 miles (0.39 km) long, and is aligned in a north–south direction.

Maryland Route 965A (Kenilworth Avenue) the southern end joins a ramp from the interchange of Maryland State Route 210, Interstate 295, and U.S. Route 50; and the north end intersects with the Washington, D.C. Line. It is located in Prince George's County, is approximately 0.09 miles (0.14 km) long, and is aligned in a north–south direction.

Browse numbered routes
← MD 964	→ MD 967

== MD 967 ==
Maryland Route 967
- Location: Prince George's County
- Length: 0.03 mi (48 m)

Maryland Route 967 is the unsigned designation for Service Road, which intersects Colebrooke Drive and ends approximately 150 feet (46 m) south of the intersection, therefore providing about 0.03 miles (0.048 km) of length. It is located in Prince George's County and is aligned in a north–south direction.

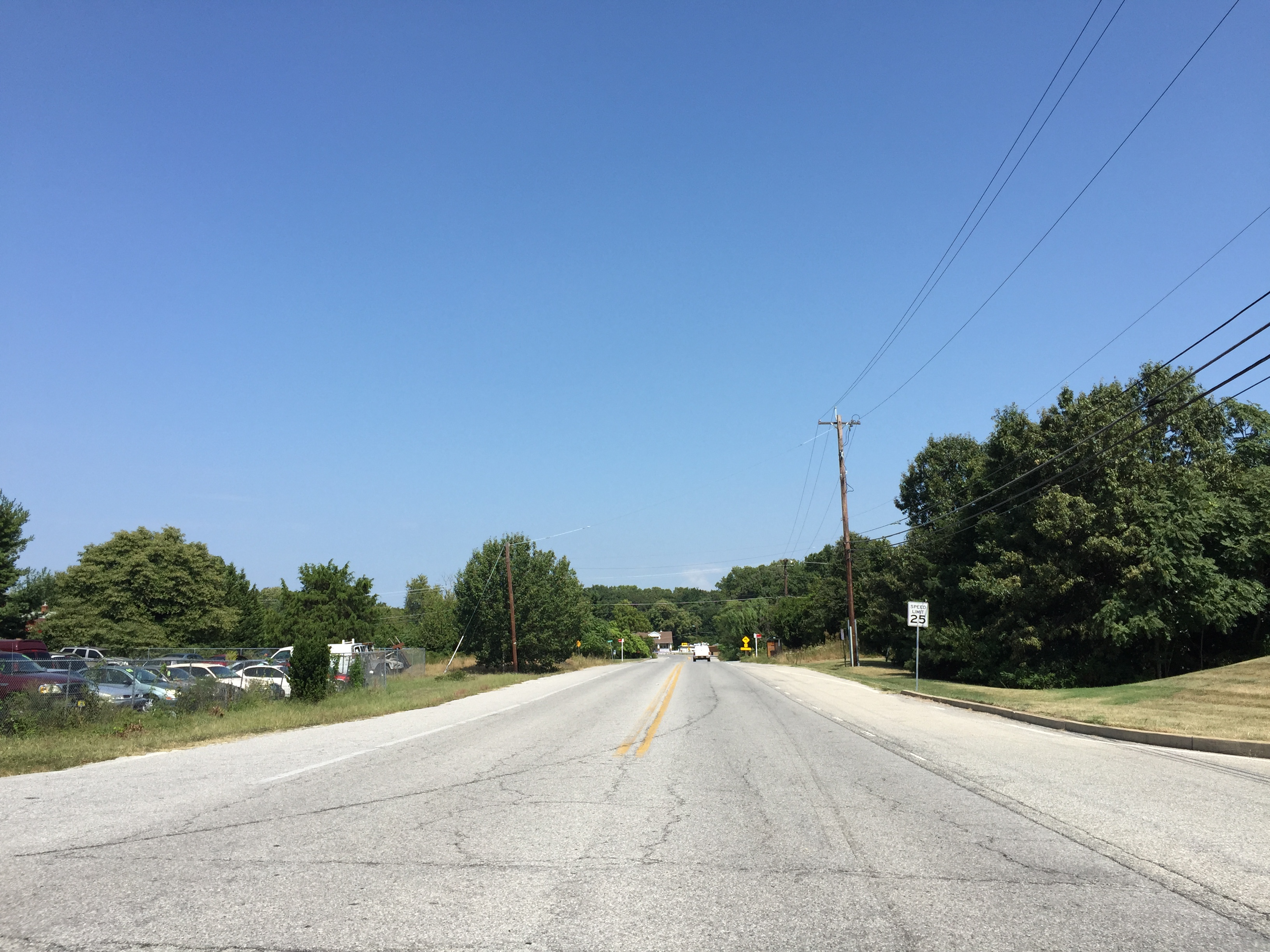
View north along MD 967A in Prince George's County

There are other separate segments of MD 967:

- MD 967A is also named Old Branch Avenue and Bedford Way. It connects Maryland Route 5 with Maryland Route 414. It is approximately 0.98 miles (1.58 km) long and is aligned in a north–south direction.
- MD 967B (Old Branch Avenue) connects Maryland Route 5 with Beech Road. It is approximately 0.38 miles (0.61 km) long and is aligned in a north–south direction.
- MD 967C is also named Old Branch Avenue and Simpson Road. It ends approximately 50 feet (15 m) south of Keppler Road and connects to Maryland Route 5. It is approximately 0.29 miles (0.47 km) long and is aligned in a north–south direction.
- MD 967D (Service Road) connects Maryland Route 5L with Maryland Route 5. It is approximately 0.54 miles (0.87 km) long and is aligned in a north–south direction.

Browse numbered routes
← MD 965	→ MD 968

== MD 968 ==
Maryland Route 968
- Location: Greenbelt
- Length: 0.06 mi (97 m)

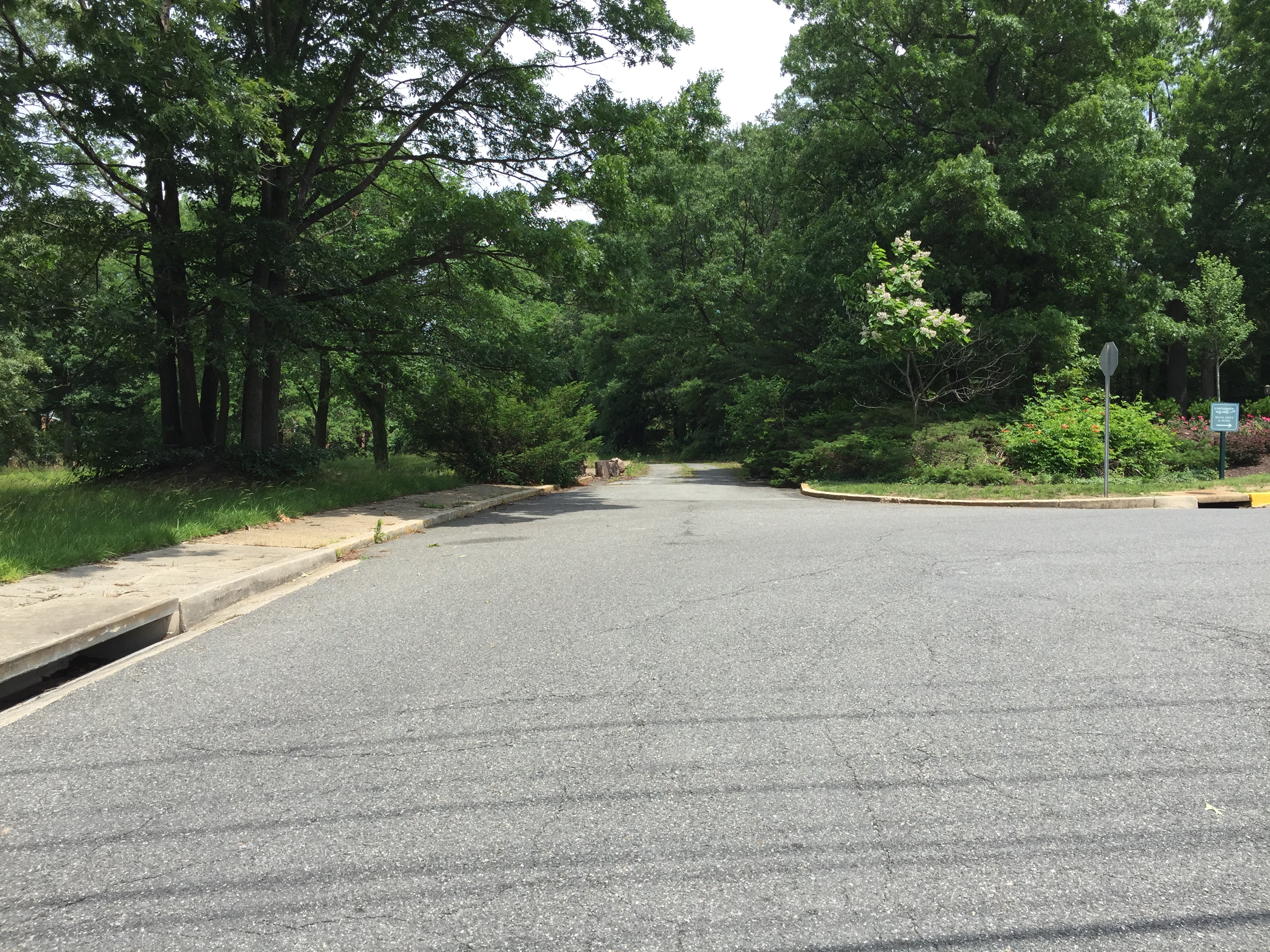
MD 968 at MD 193 in Greenbelt

Maryland Route 968 is the unsigned designation for the Entrance to the National Guard Armory. It intersects Maryland Route 193 and ends approximately 200 feet (61 m) north of Convalescent Road in Greenbelt, Prince George's County. It is approximately 0.06 miles (0.097 km) long and is aligned in a north–south direction.

Browse numbered routes
← MD 967	→ MD 969

== MD 969 ==
Maryland Route 969
- Location: Linthicum
- Length: 0.08 mi (130 m)

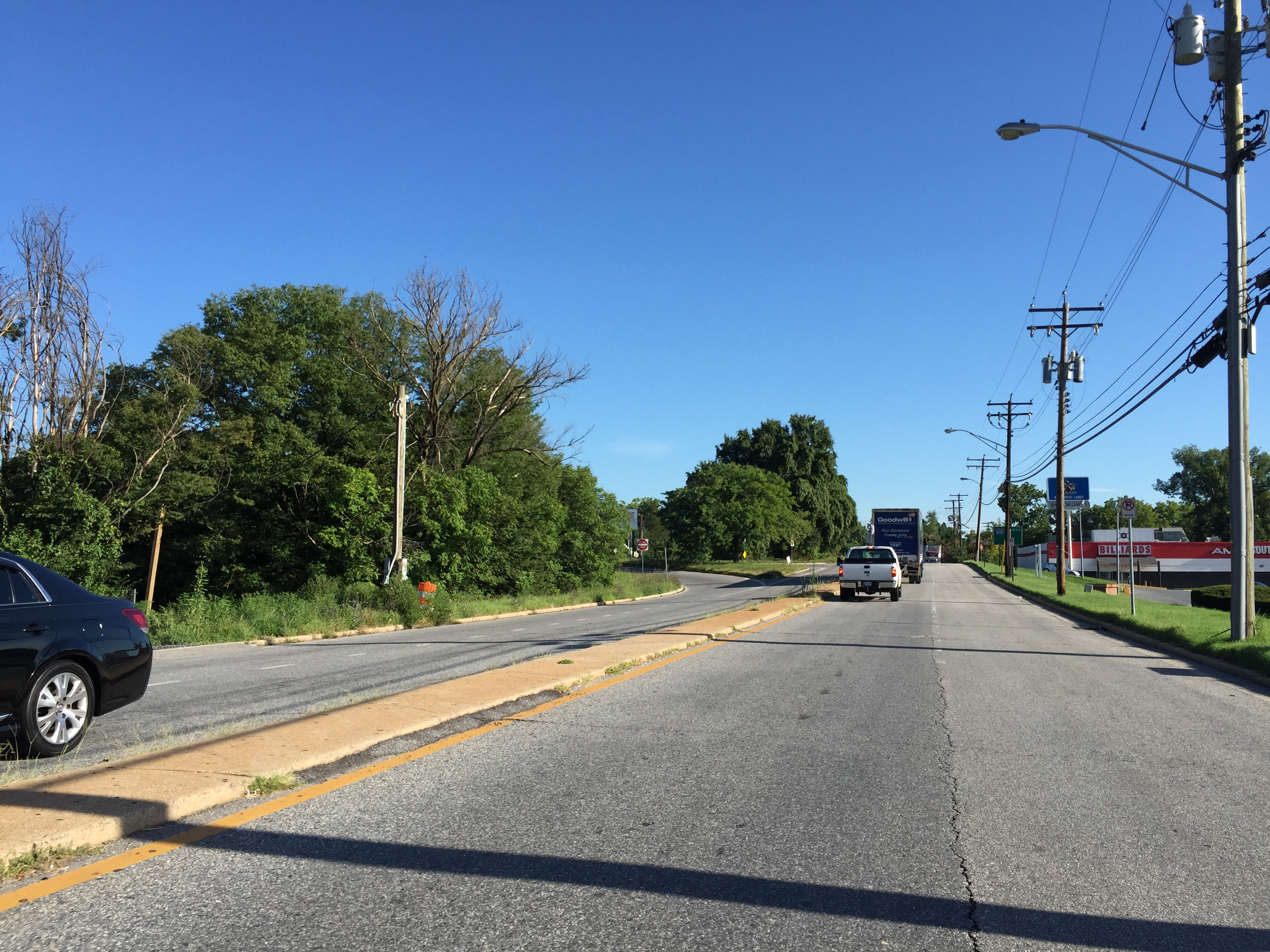
View north along MD 969A at MD 168 in Linthicum

Maryland Route 969 is the unsigned designation for Eleanor Drive, which runs from MD 168 north to a dead end in Linthicum, Anne Arundel County. The route is 0.08 mi (0.13 km) long.

- MD 969A is the unsigned designation for a portion of Fairview Avenue running from MD 168 north to a set of ramps to and from the northbound direction of I-695 in Linthicum, Anne Arundel County. The route is 0.11 mi (0.18 km) long.

Browse numbered routes
← MD 968	→ MD 972

== MD 972 ==
Maryland Route 972
- Location: Prince George's County
- Length: 0.43 mi (690 m)

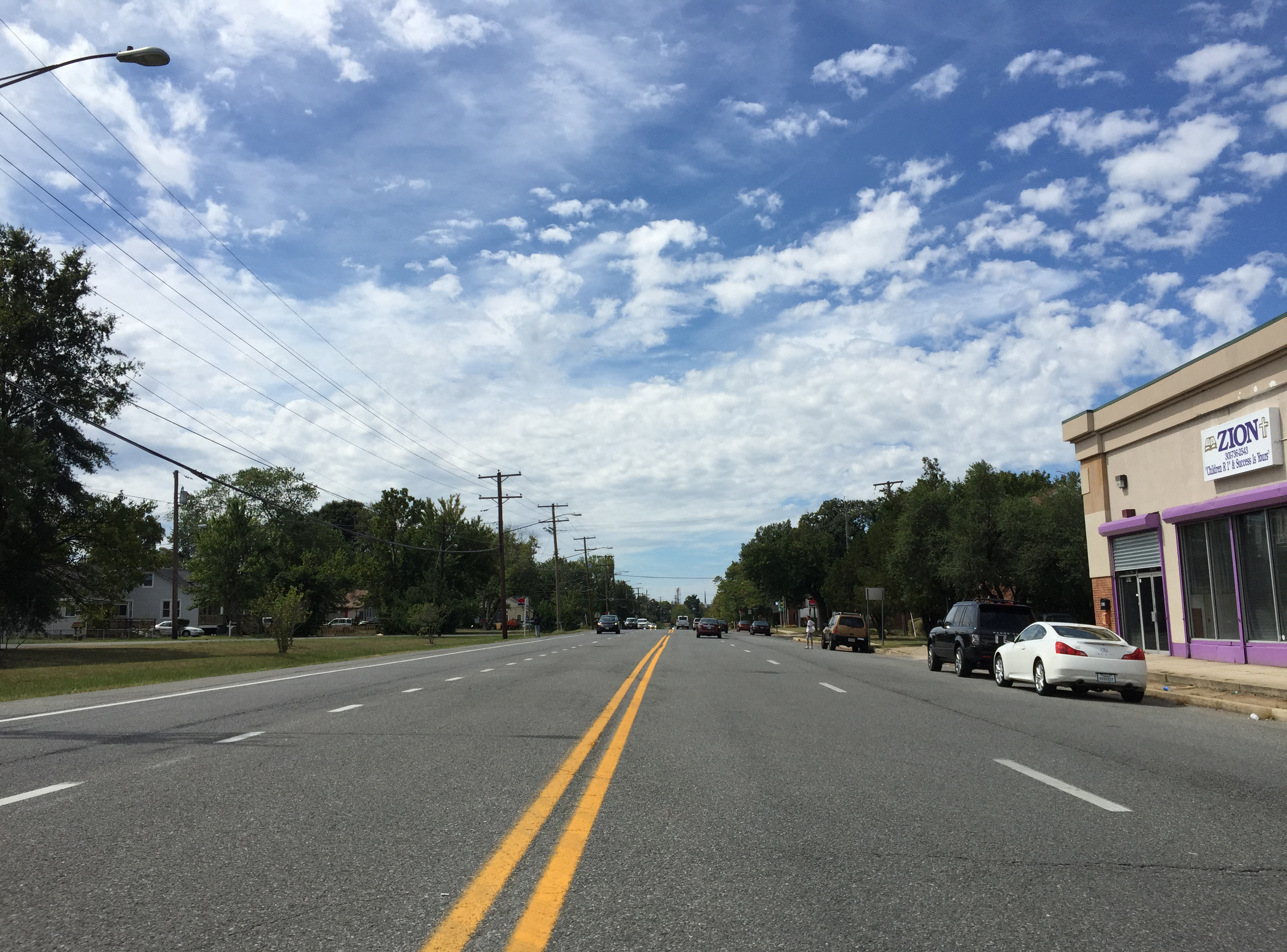
View west along MD 972 in District Heights

Maryland Route 972A (Old Silver Hill Road) connects Maryland Route 458 with county-maintained Marlboro Pike in Prince George's County. It is approximately 0.43 miles (0.69 km) long and is aligned in an east–west direction.

Browse numbered routes
← MD 969	→ MD 973

== MD 973 ==
Maryland Route 973
- Location: Tuxedo
- Length: 0.06 mi (97 m)

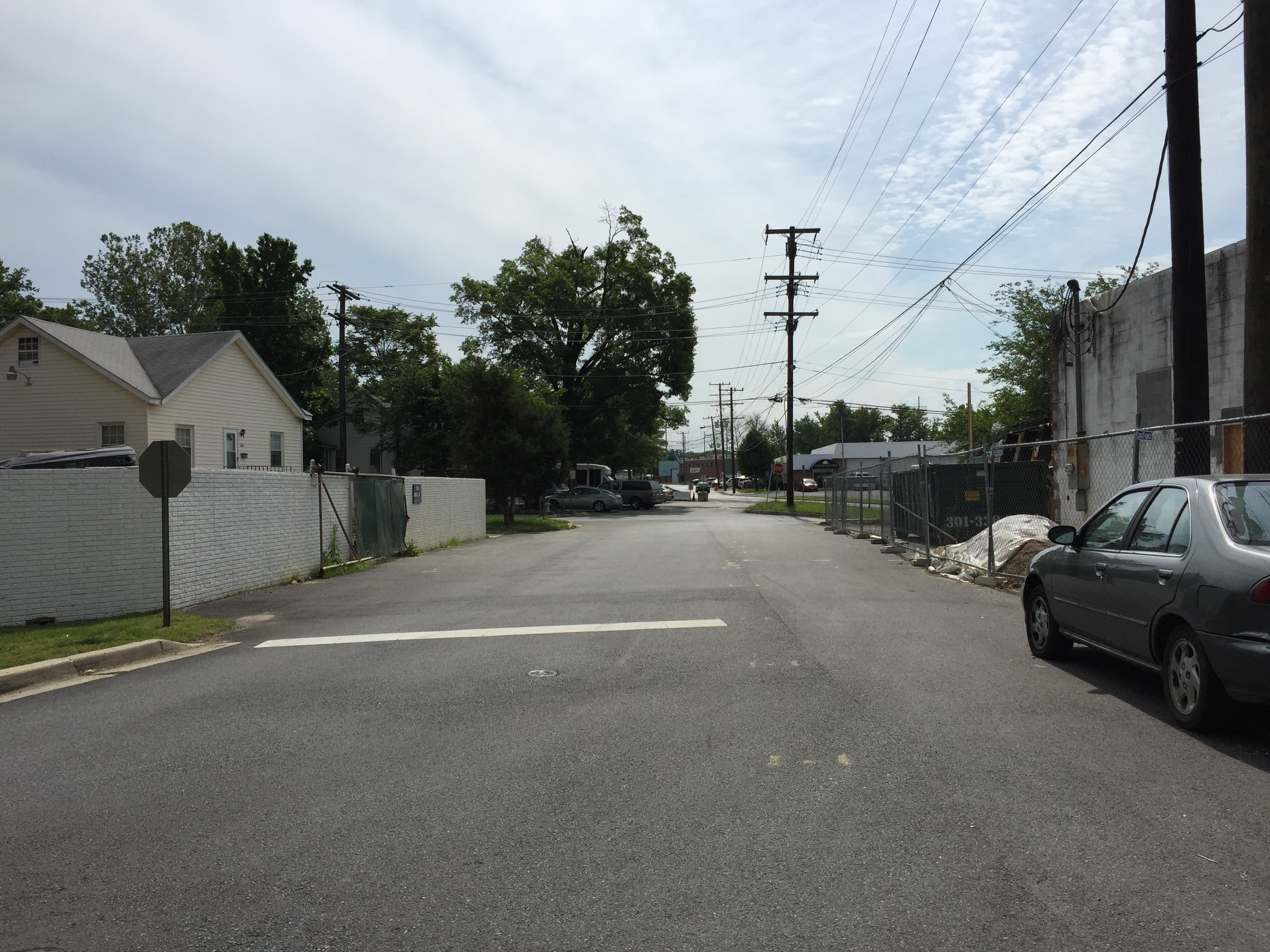
MD 973 in Cheverly

Maryland Route 973 (officially MD 973B) is the unsigned designation for Tuxedo Road, a 0.06 mi (0.097 km) spur that runs west from MD 459 (Tuxedo Road) just east of the crossing of the Alexandria Extension of CSX's Capital Subdivision.

Browse numbered routes
← MD 972	→ MD 974

== MD 974 ==
Maryland Route 974
- Location: Prince George's County
- Length: 0.10 mi (160 m)

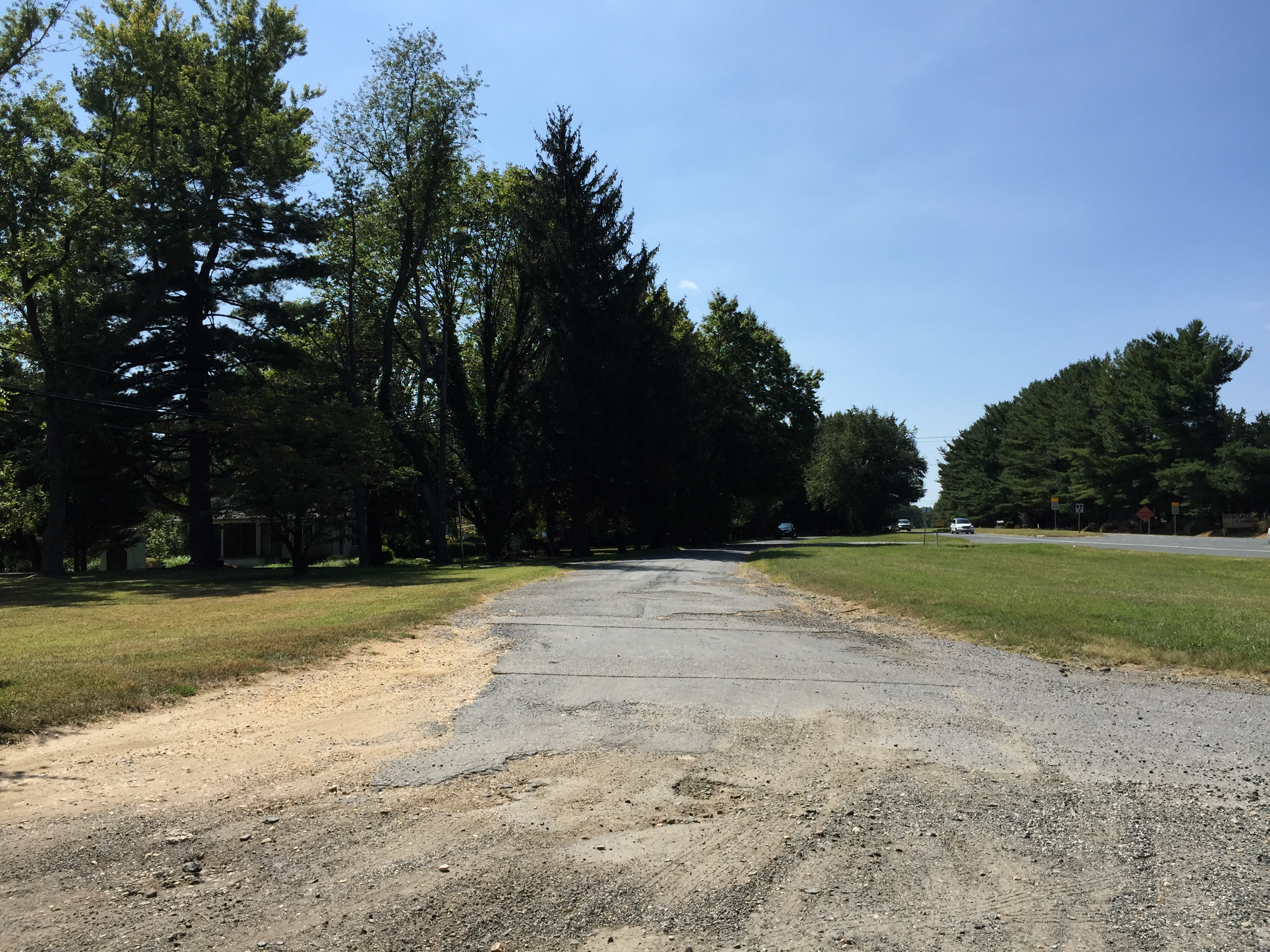
View south along MD 974 in Prince George's County

Maryland Route 974 is the unsigned designation for an unnamed road for the first 0.08 miles (0.13 km) and is named Sondberg Lane for the last 0.02 miles (0.032 km). It intersects Maryland Route 193 and ends approximately 200 feet (61 m) south of the Belvidere Avenue spur in Prince George's County. It is approximately 0.10 miles (0.16 km) long and is aligned in a north–south direction.

Browse numbered routes
← MD 973	→ MD 975

== MD 975 ==
Maryland Route 975
- Location: Oxon Hill
- Length: 0.06 mi (97 m)

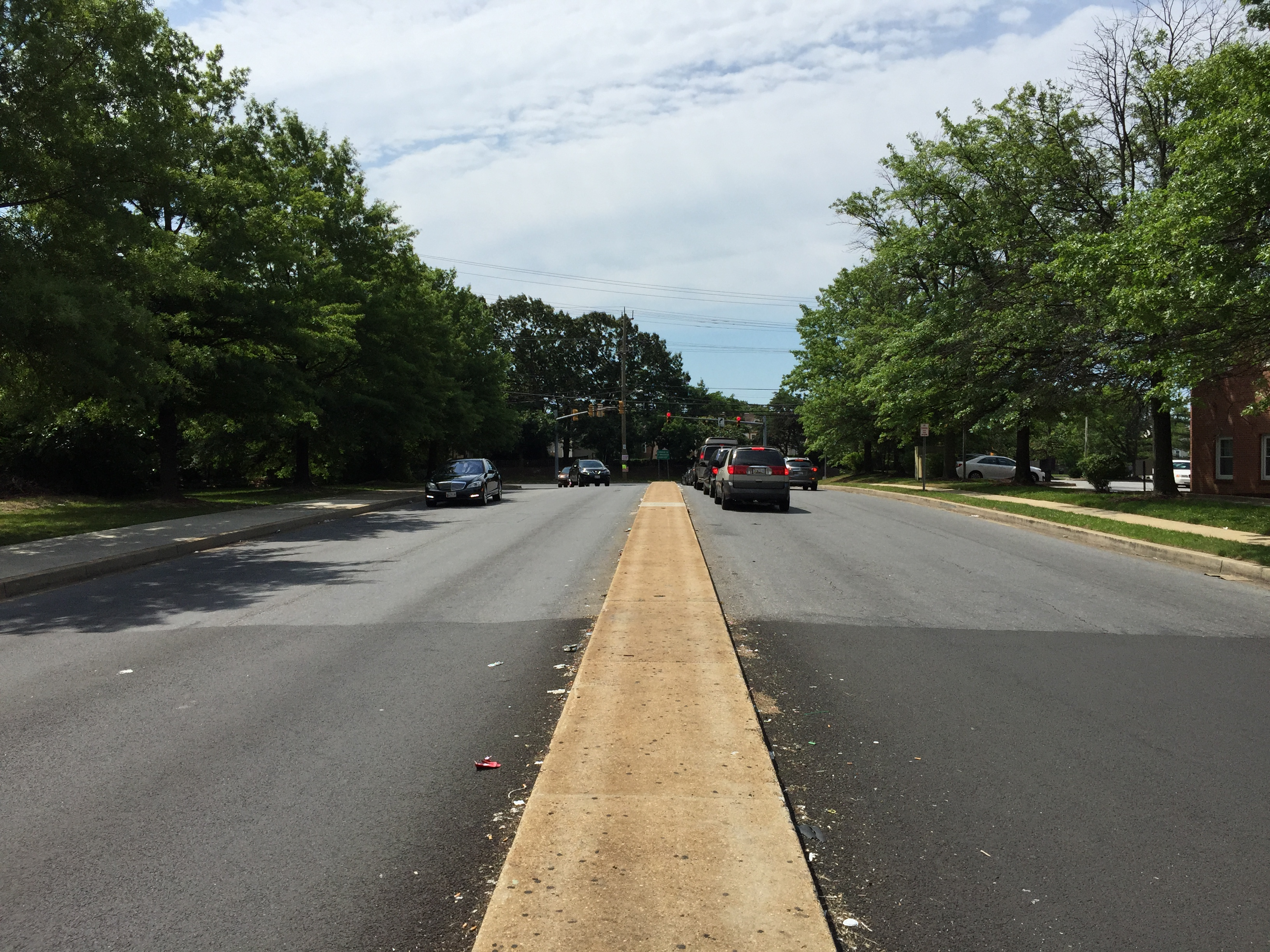
MD 975 at MD 414 in Oxon Hill

Maryland Route 975 (officially MD 975A) is the unsigned designation for John Hanson Lane, which runs 0.06 miles (0.097 km) from St. Barnabas Road north to MD 414 in Oxon Hill. MD 975 provides full access between MD 414 and the county-maintained portion of St. Barnabas Road. The highway also connects MD 414 with Brinkley Road, a county highway that provides access to Rosecroft Raceway.

Browse numbered routes
← MD 974	→ MD 976

== MD 976 ==
Maryland Route 976
- Location: Prince George's County
- Length: 0.31 mi (500 m)

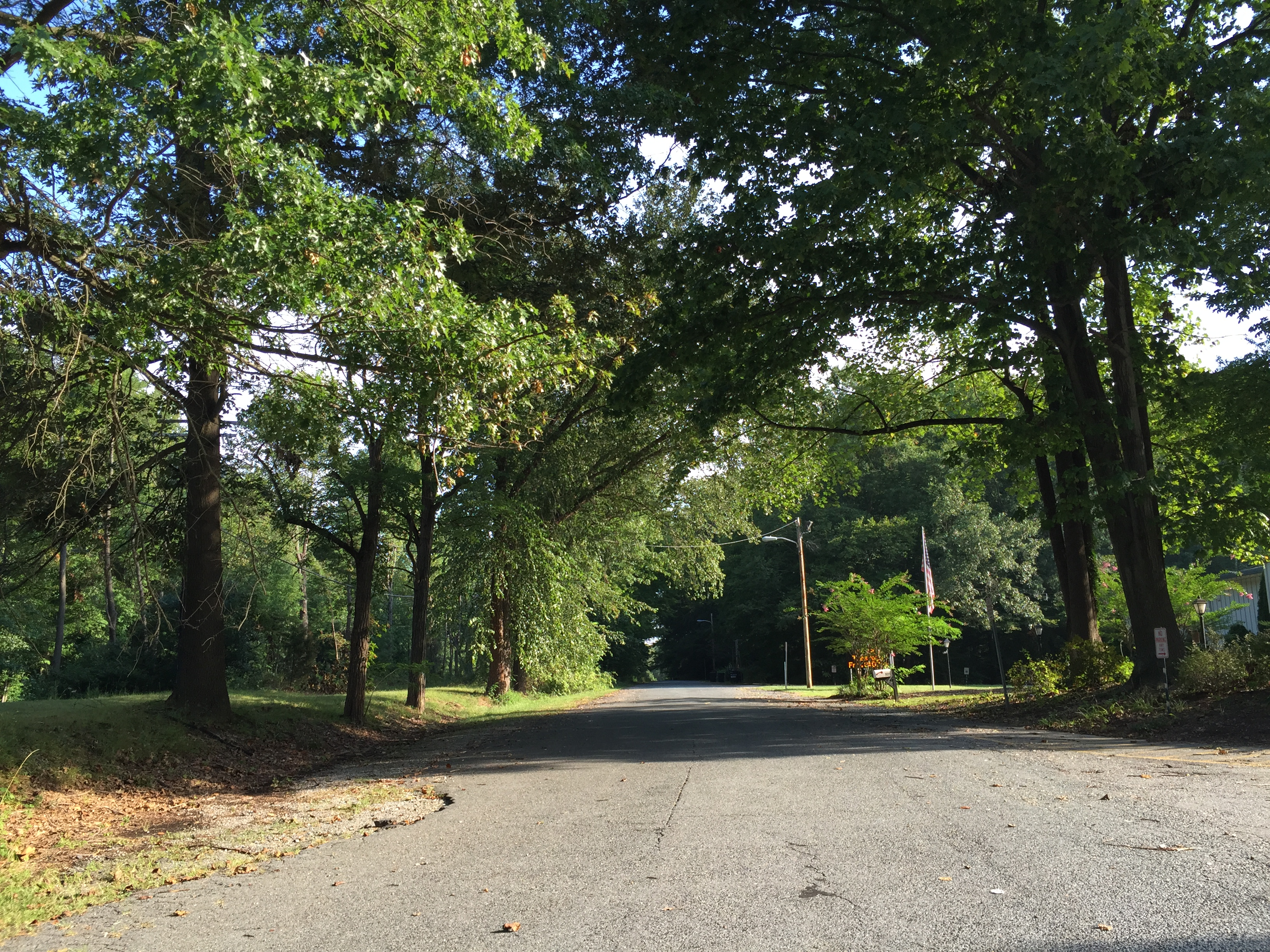
View north along MD 976 at MD 3 in Prince George's County

Maryland Route 976 (Columbian Way) connects Maryland Route 3 at county-maintained Forest Drive with Maryland Route 3 in Prince George's County. It is approximately 0.31 miles (0.50 km) long and is aligned in a north–south direction.

There are several separate segments of MD 976:

- MD 976A is an unnamed roadway that intersects Rosaryville Road and ends approximately 150 feet (46 m) south and 600 feet (180 m) north of the intersection. It is approximately 0.14 miles (0.23 km) long and is aligned in a north–south direction.
- MD 976B is an unnamed roadway that begins at the U.S. Route 301 crossover, intersects Ireland Road, and then ends at U.S. Route 301. It is approximately 0.22 miles (0.35 km) long and is aligned in a north–south direction.
- MD 976C is an unnamed roadway that intersects U.S. Route 301 and ends approximately 850 feet (260 m) east of the intersection. It is approximately 0.16 miles (0.26 km) long and is aligned in an east–west direction.

Browse numbered routes
← MD 975	→ MD 977

== MD 977 ==
Maryland Route 977
- Location: Prince George's County

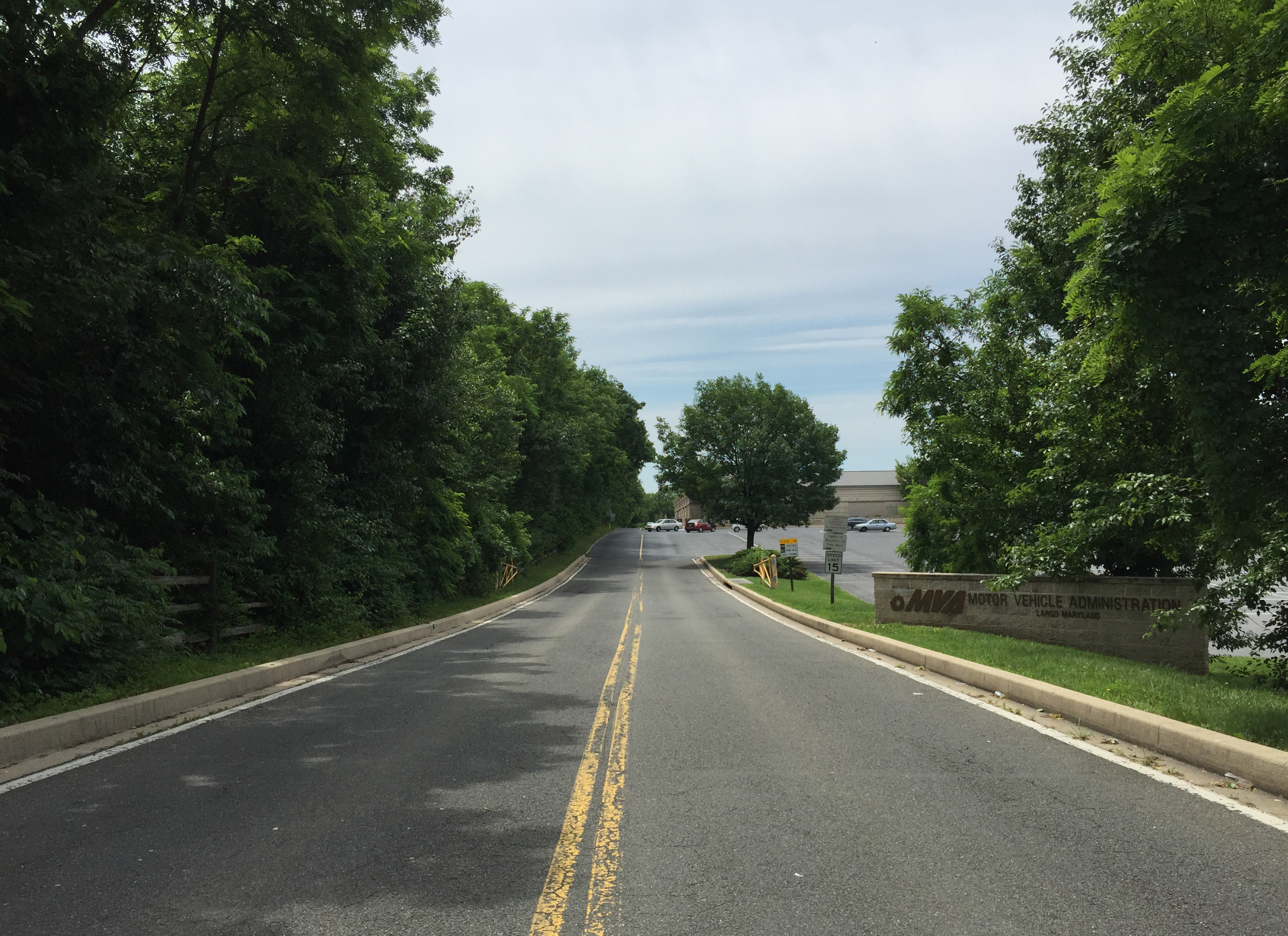
View south along MD 977F at the entrance to the Maryland Motor Vehicle Administration complex in Largo

Maryland Route 977 is the unsigned designation for several stretches of road in Prince George's County:

- MD 977F is an unnamed roadway that connects Maryland Route 214 with Maryland Route 202. It is approximately 0.48 miles (0.77 km) long and is aligned in a north–south direction. It primarily serves as an access road to the Largo offices of the Maryland Motor Vehicle Administration.
- MD 977H is an unnamed roadway that intersects Maryland Route 202 and ends approximately 1,000 feet (300 m) north of the intersection. It is approximately 0.19 miles (0.31 km) long, and is aligned in a north–south direction.

Browse numbered routes
← MD 976	→ MD 978

== MD 978 ==
Maryland Route 978
- Location: Prince George's County

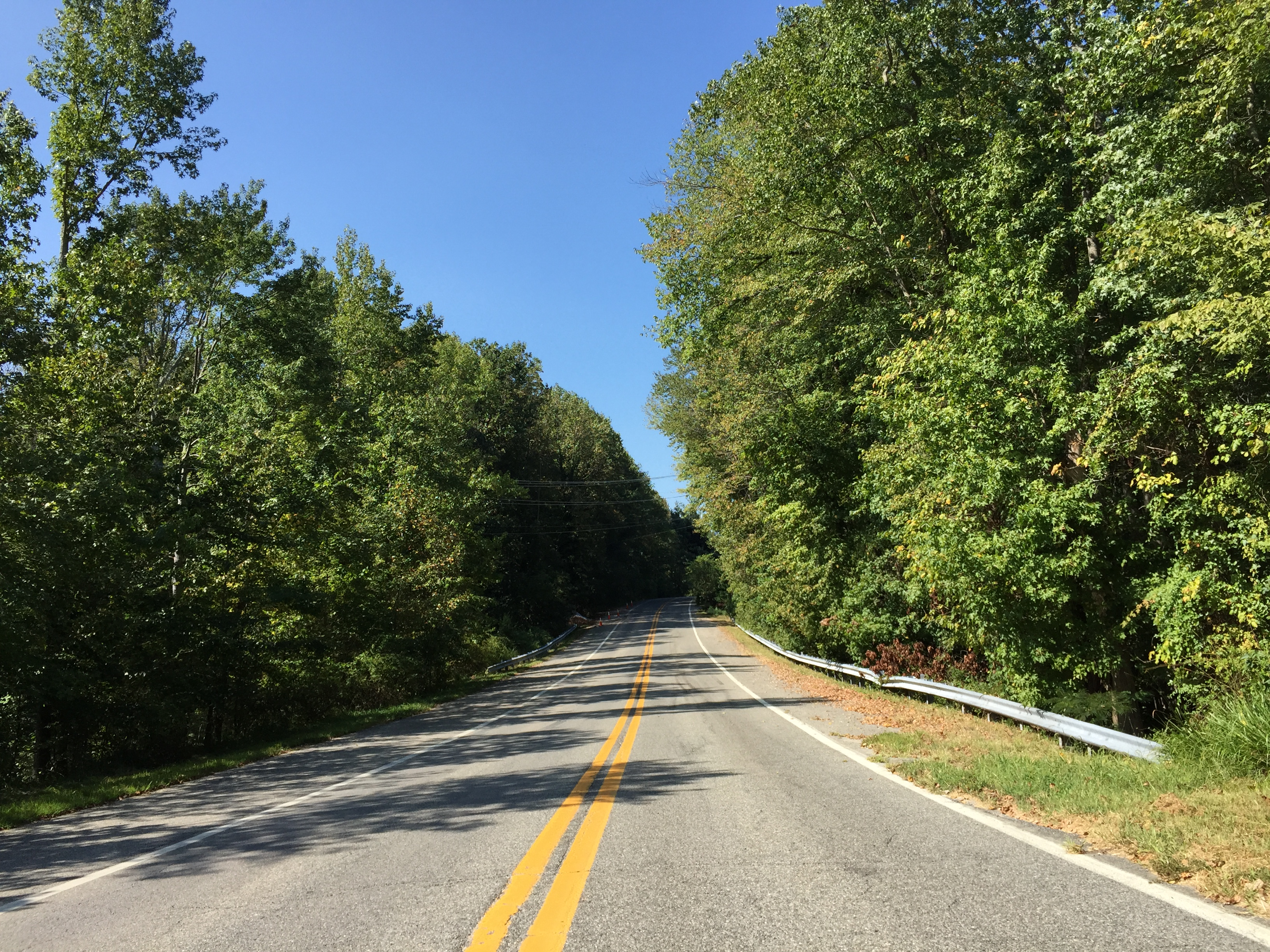
View west along MD 978B at MD 214 in Prince George's County

Maryland Route 978 is the unsigned designation for several stretches of road in Prince George's County:

- MD 978A (Hall Road) connects Maryland Route 978C and Maryland Route 214 in Bowie. It is approximately 0.63 miles (1.01 km) long and is aligned in an east–west direction.
- MD 978B (Old Central Avenue) connects two points along the current alignment of Maryland Route 214 in the vicinity of U.S. Route 301. It is approximately 0.84 miles (1.35 km) long and is aligned in an east–west direction.
- MD 978C (Devonwood Drive) connects Maryland Route 214 and Maryland Route 978A in Bowie. It is approximately 0.04 miles (0.064 km) long and is aligned in a north–south direction.

Browse numbered routes
← MD 977	→ MD 979

== MD 979 ==
Maryland Route 979
- Location: Laurel
- Length: 0.07 mi (110 m)

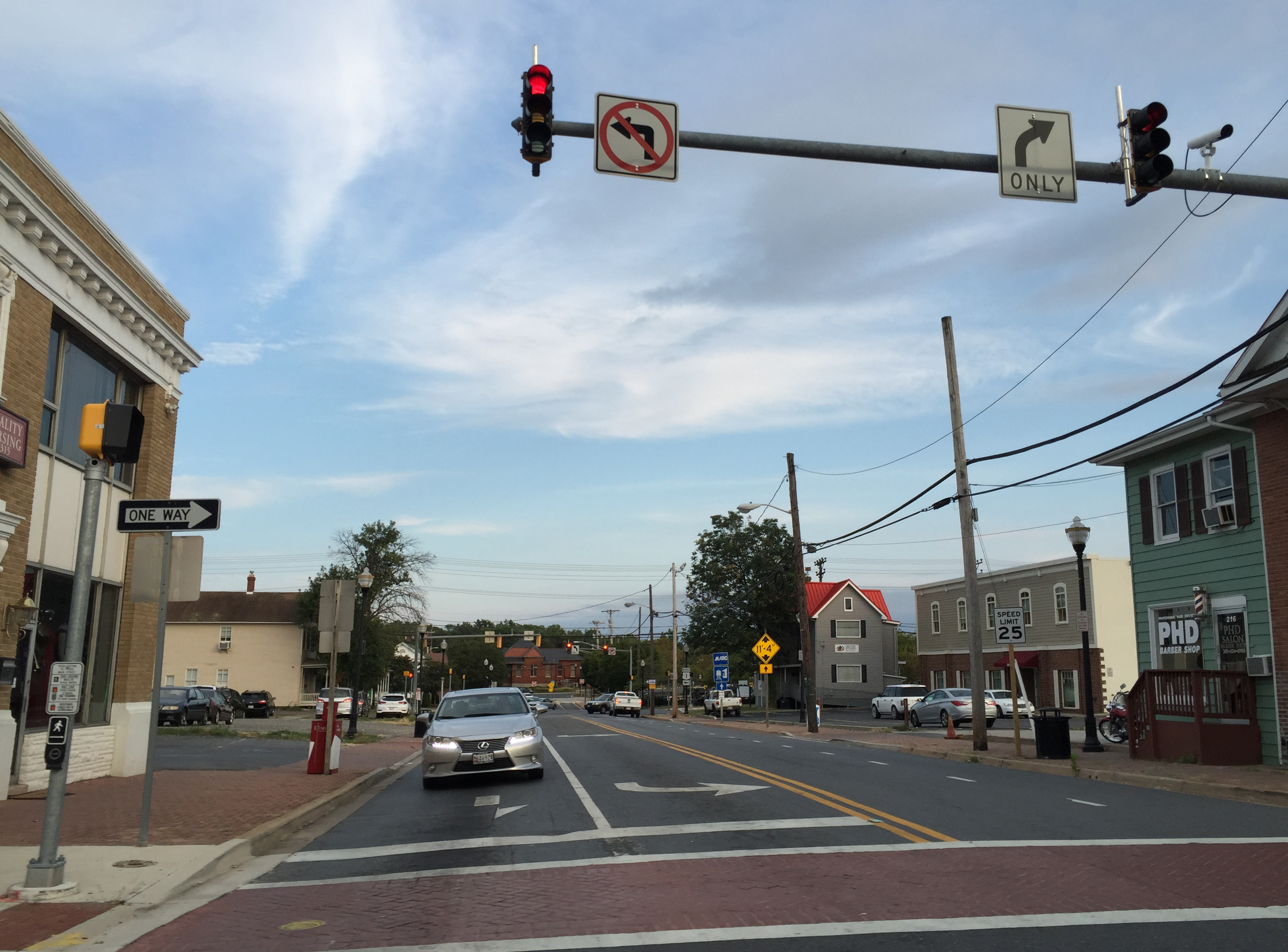
View south along MD 979 at US 1 in Laurel

Maryland Route 979 is the unsigned designation for Main Street, which connects U.S. 1 and city-maintained Main Street in Laurel, Prince George's County. It is approximately 0.07 miles (0.11 km) long and is aligned in a north–south direction.

Browse numbered routes
← MD 978	→ MD 980

== MD 981 ==
Maryland Route 981
- Location: Columbia
- Length: 0.11 mi (180 m)

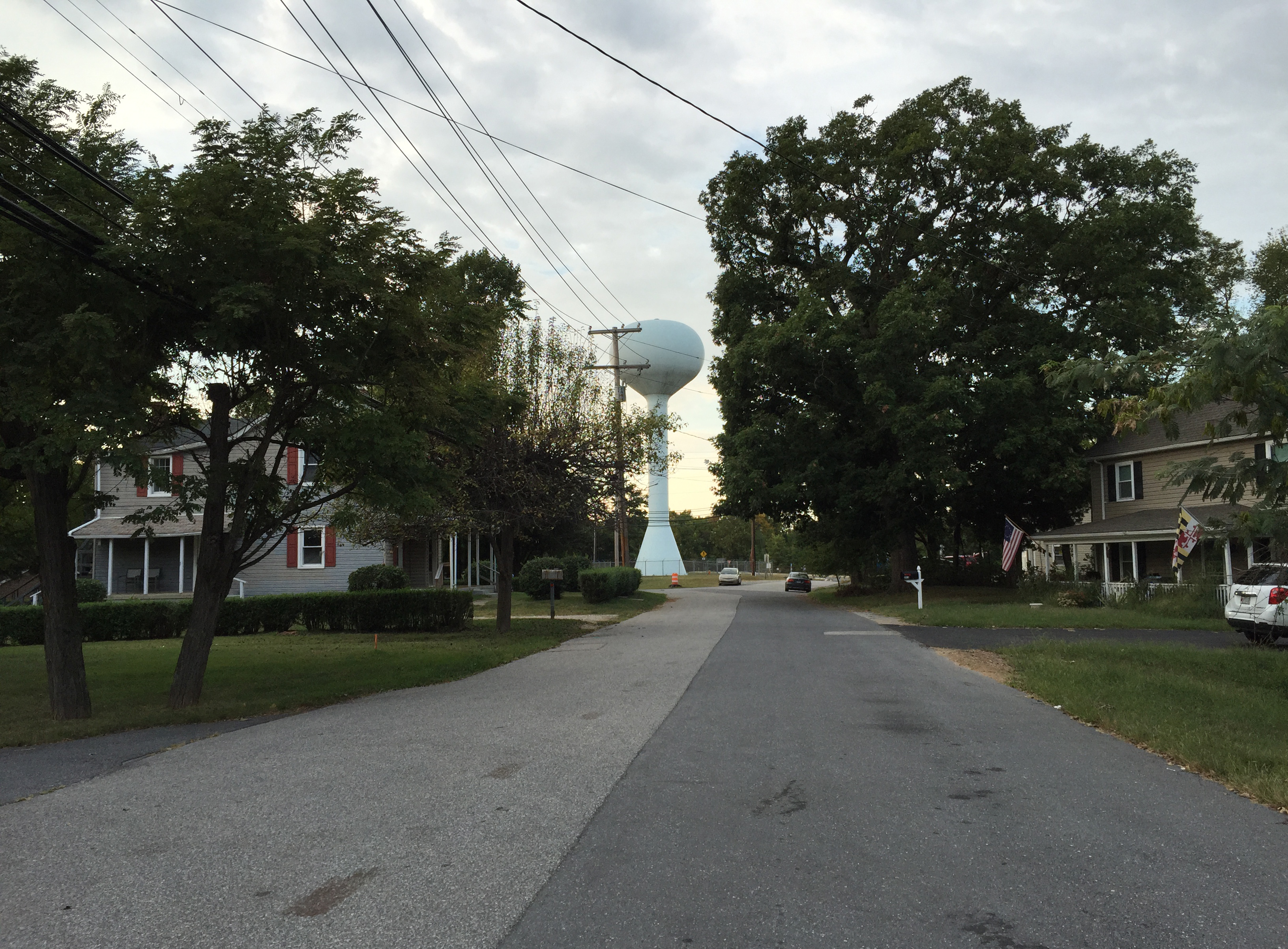
View north along MD 981 at MD 108 in Columbia

Maryland Route 981 is the unsigned designation for Tricross Drive, a loop off of MD 108 in Columbia, Howard County. The route is 0.11 mi (0.18 km) long.

Browse numbered routes
← MD 980	→ MD 984

== MD 984 ==
Maryland Route 984
- Location: Ellicott City
- Length: 0.22 mi (350 m)

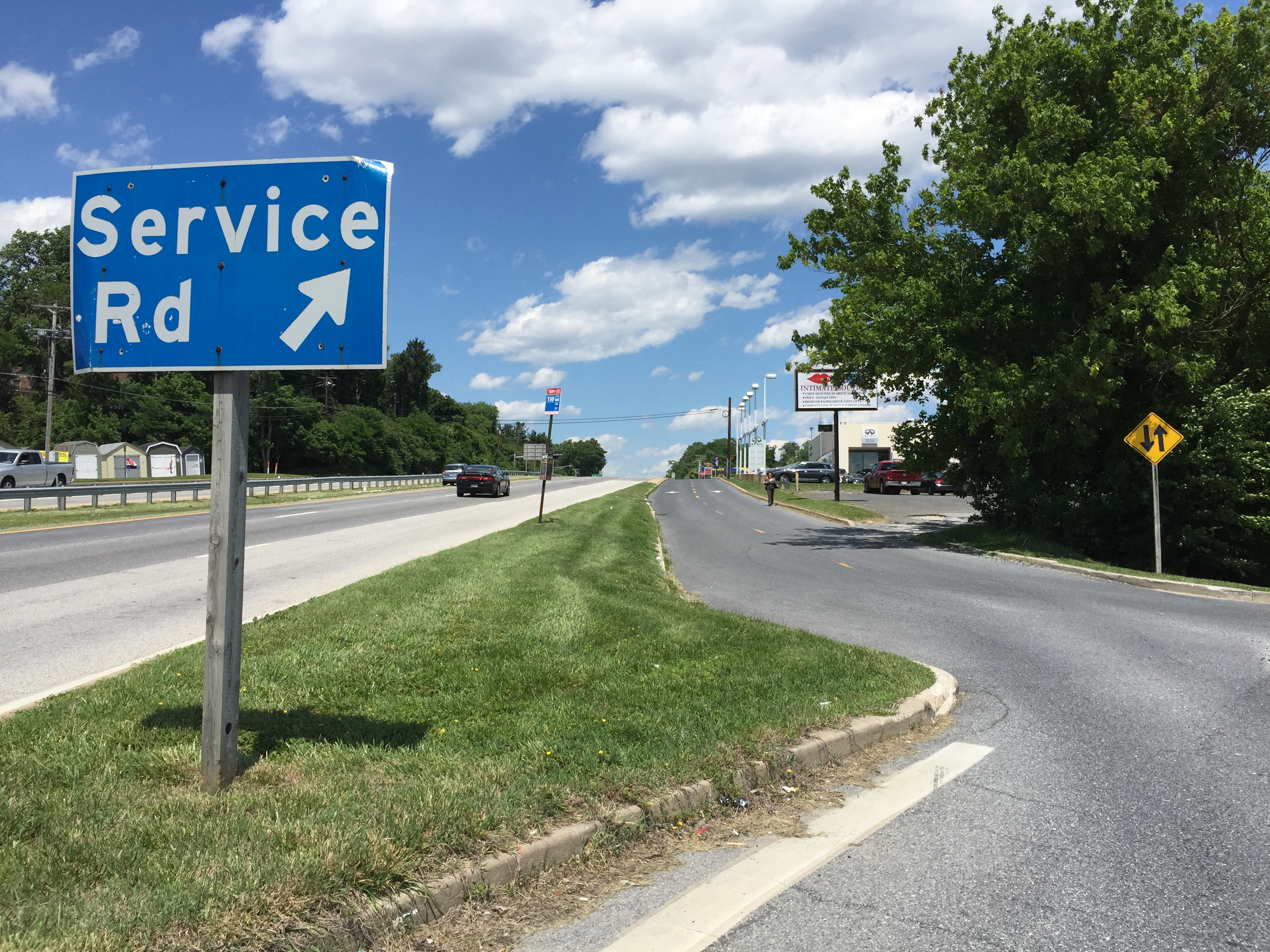
West end of MD 984 at US 40 in Ellicott City

Maryland Route 984 is the unsigned designation for an unnamed service road which runs along the south side of US 40 near Normandy Drive east to Wheaton Way in Ellicott City, Howard County. The route is 0.22 mi (0.35 km) long.

Browse numbered routes
← MD 981	→ MD 985

== MD 985 ==
Maryland Route 985
- Location: Ellicott City
- Length: 0.55 mi (890 m)

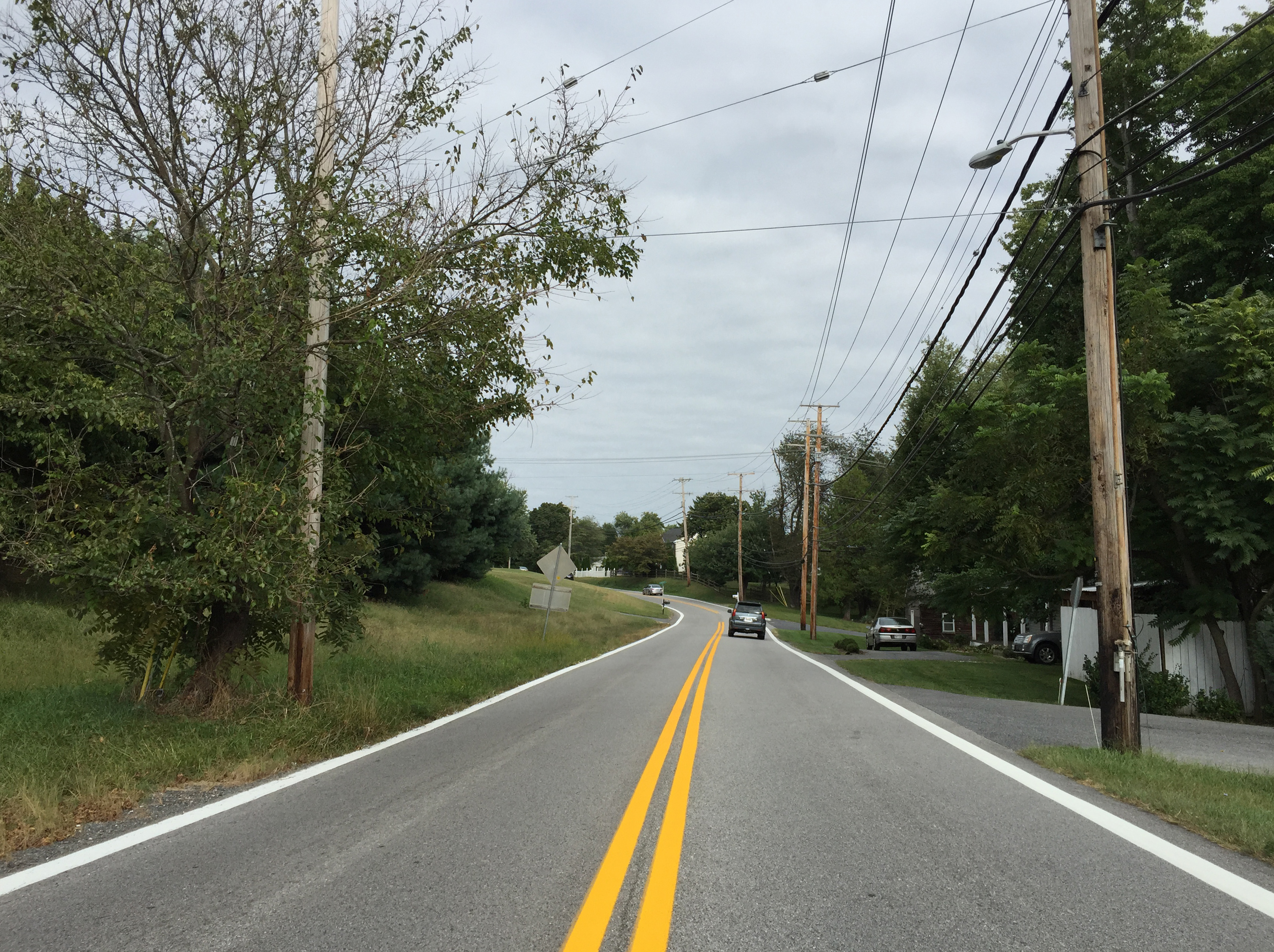
View east along MD 985A in Ellicott City

Maryland Route 985 is the unsigned designation for Old Frederick Road, running from a dead end east to Rogers Avenue in Ellicott City, Howard County. The route is 0.55 mi (0.89 km) long.

- MD 985A is the unsigned designation for Old Frederick Road and Rogers Avenue, running from a roundabout at Rogers Avenue east to a dead end in Ellicott City, Howard County. The route is 0.30 mi (0.48 km) long.

Browse numbered routes
← MD 984	→ MD 986

== MD 986 ==
Maryland Route 986
- Location: Fulton
- Length: 0.06 mi (97 m)

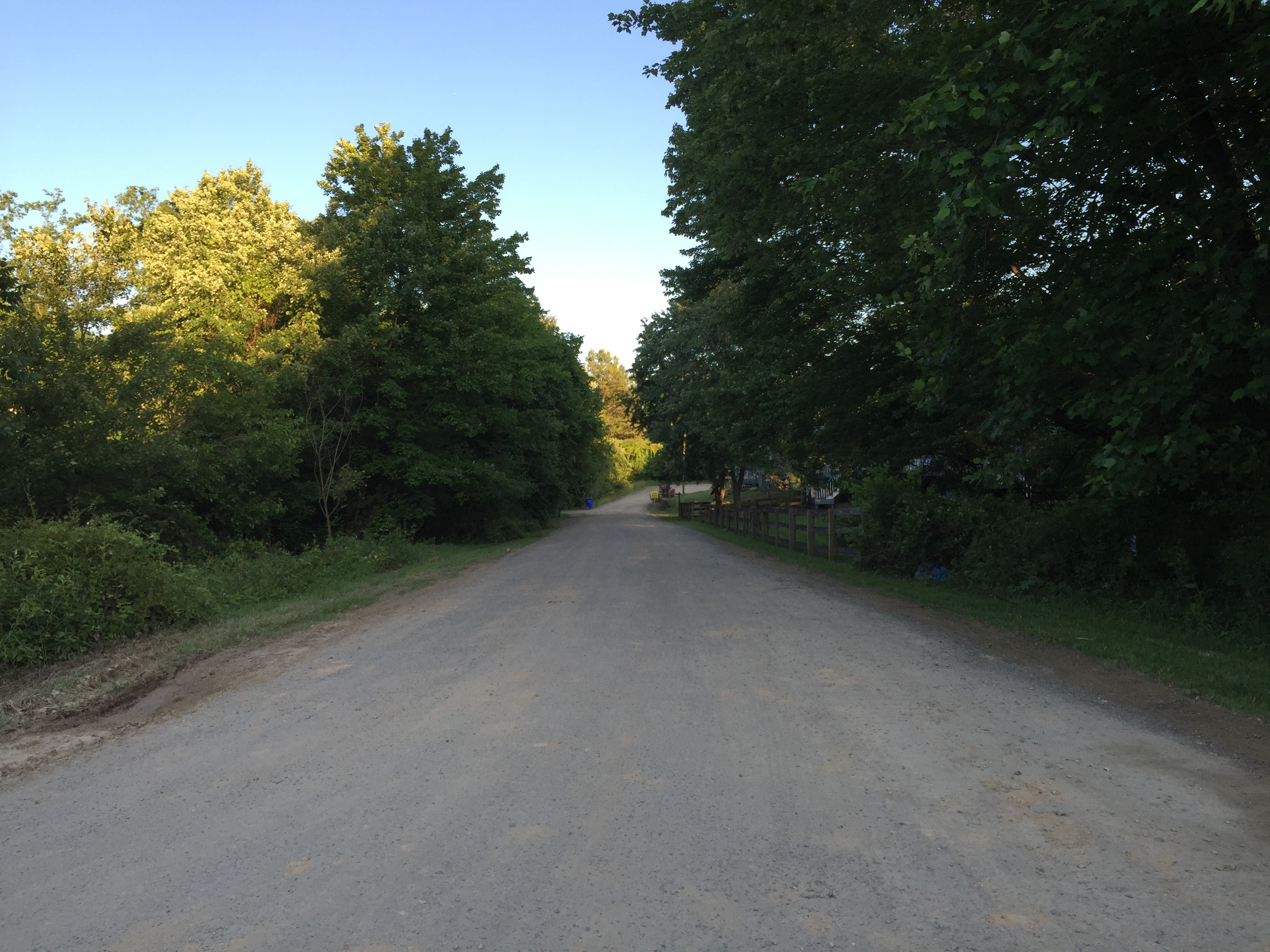
MD 986 in Fulton

Maryland Route 986 (officially MD 986M) is the unsigned designation for an unnamed road running from Prince Manor Way east to a dead end in Fulton, Howard County. The route is 0.06 mi (0.097 km) long.

Browse numbered routes
← MD 985	→ MD 990

== MD 990 ==
Maryland Route 990
- Location: Pasadena
- Length: 0.01 mi (16 m)

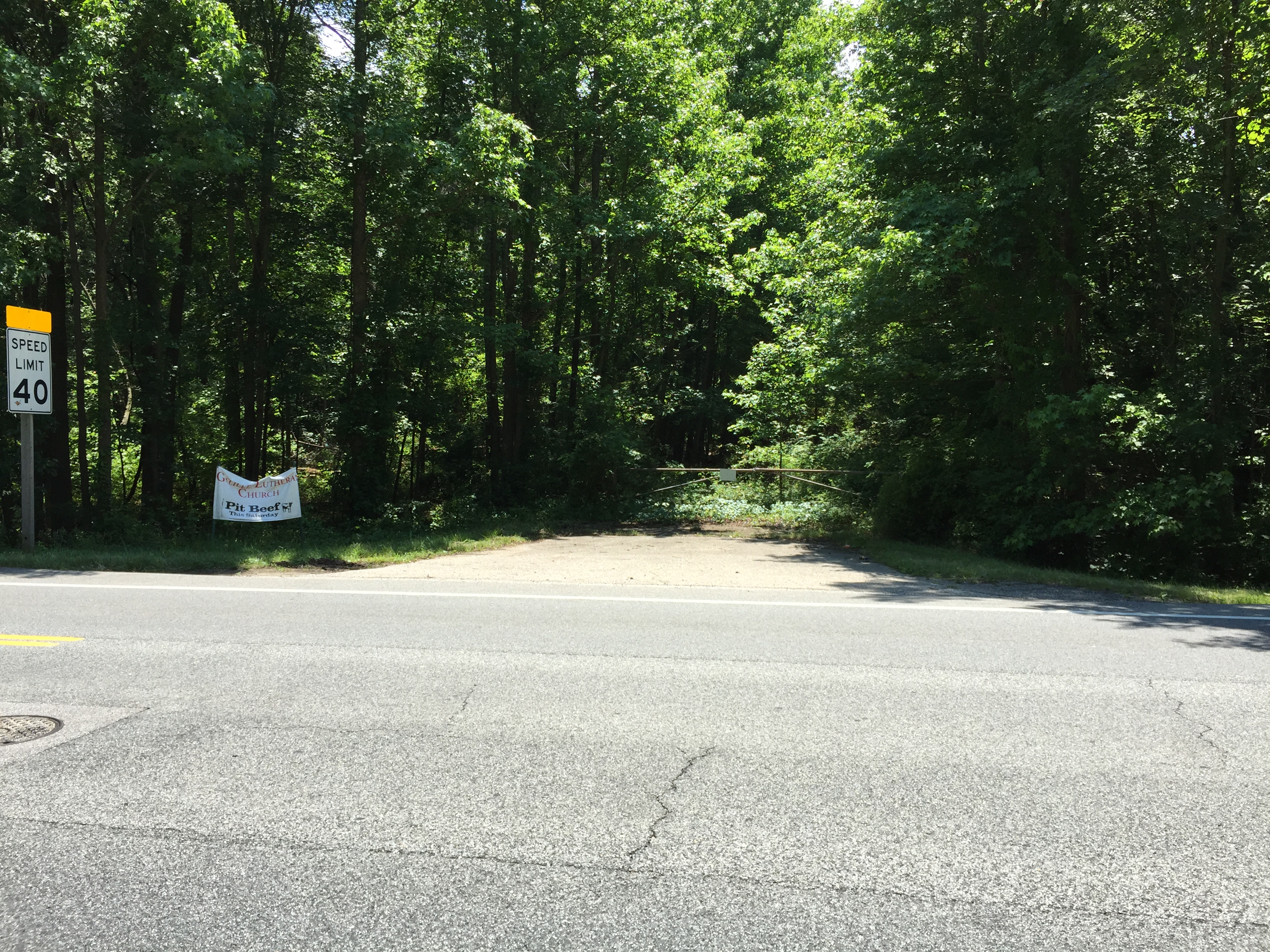
MD 990 at MD 177 in Pasadena

Maryland Route 990 is the unsigned designation for an unnamed stub running from MD 177 south to a dead end in Pasadena, Anne Arundel County. The route is 0.01 mi (0.016 km) long. It, along with Routes 939 and 963, are the shortest state highways in the United States.

Browse numbered routes
← MD 986	→ MD 991

== MD 991 ==
Maryland Route 991
- Location: Salisbury
- Length: 0.02 mi (32 m)

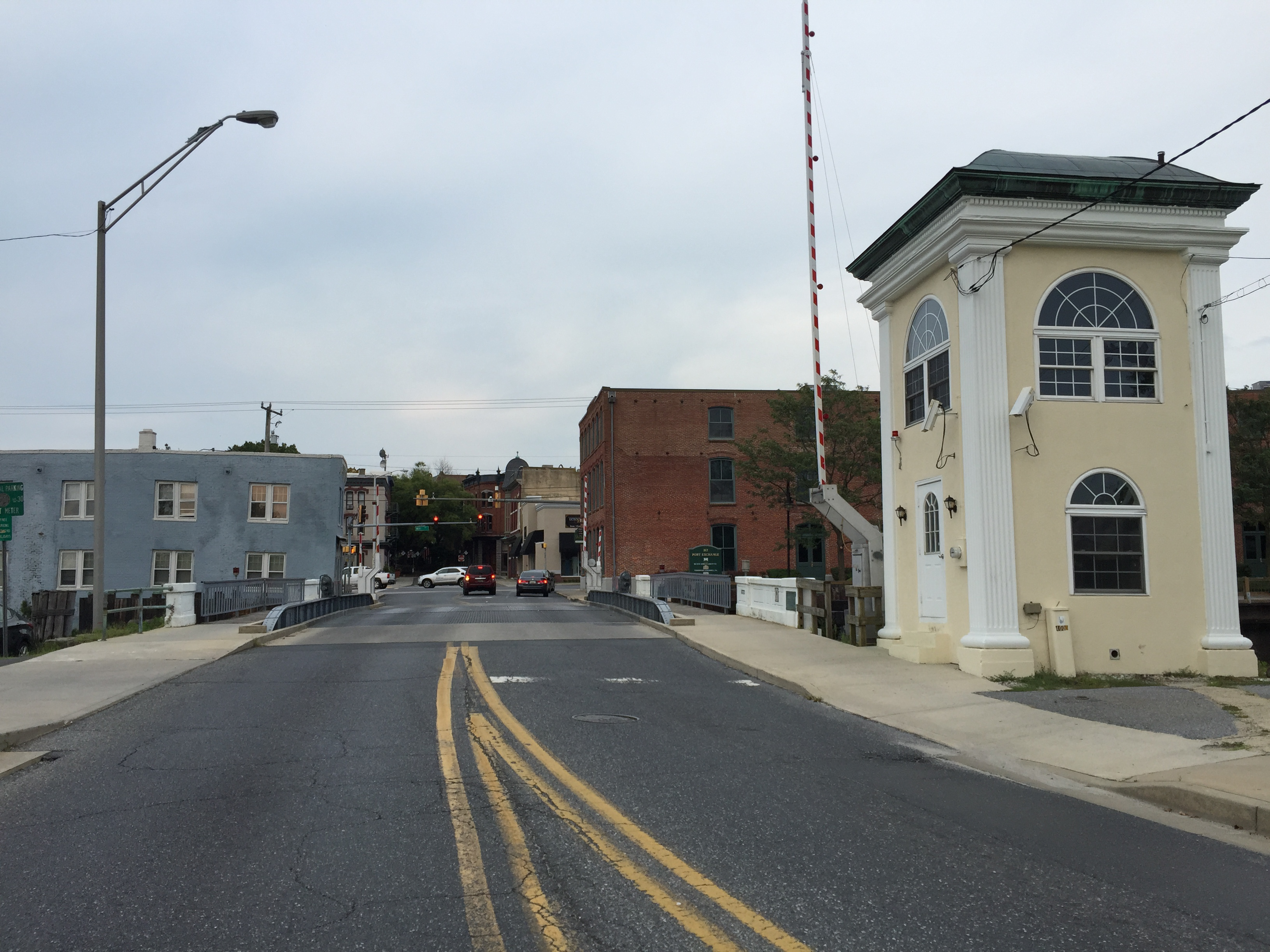
MD 991 over the Wicomico River in Salisbury

Maryland Route 991 is the unsigned designation for the West Main Street drawbridge over the Wicomico River in Salisbury, Wicomico County. The route is 0.02 miles (0.032 km) long. The drawbridge formerly carried U.S. Route 50 over the Wicomico River until the early 1960s. West Main Street on both sides of the bridge are now owned by the City of Salisbury.

Browse numbered routes
← MD 990	→ MD 992

== MD 992 ==
Maryland Route 992
- Location: Wicomico and Worcester counties

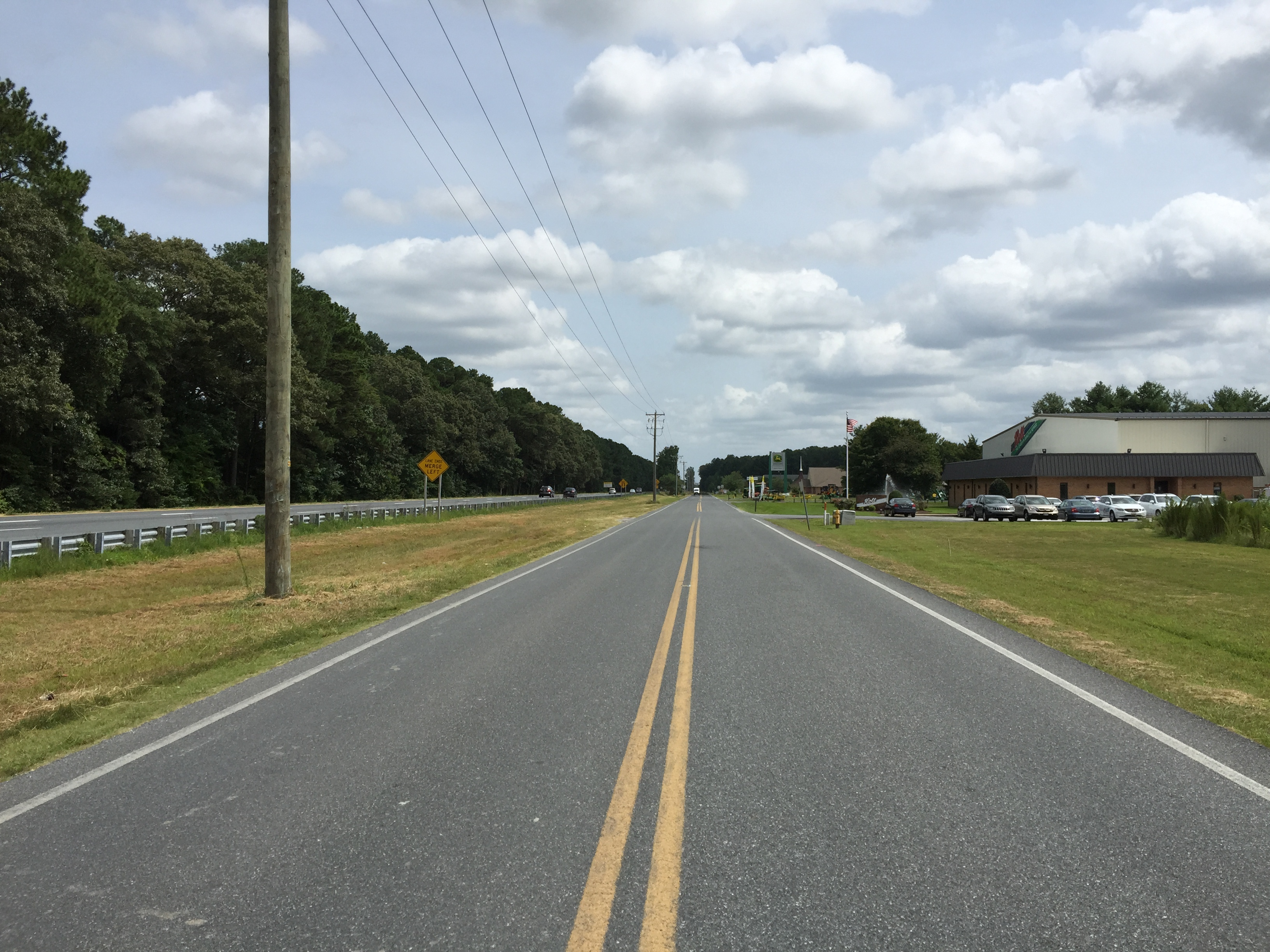
View east along MD 992A in Wicomico County

Maryland Route 992 is the unsigned designation for several frontage roads off U.S. Route 50 in Wicomico and Worcester Counties:

- MD 992A is the designation for John Deere Drive, which runs from Hobbs Road east to a dead end in Wicomico County, paralleling US 50 to the south. The route is 0.74 miles (1.19 km) long.
- MD 992B is the designation for Eastside Road, which runs from US 50 south to a dead end in Wicomico County. The route is 0.08 miles (0.13 km) long.
- MD 992C runs along Harkins Lane from Sixty Foot Road to a dead end in Wicomico County. The route is 0.07 miles (0.11 km) long.
- MD 992D runs from Friendship Road to a dead end in Wicomico County. The route is 0.21 miles (0.34 km) long.
- MD 992E is the designation for Tankard Road, which runs from White Richardson Road to a dead end in Wicomico County. The route is 0.37 miles (0.60 km) long.
- MD 992F is the designation for Caleb Road, which runs from MD 346 across US 50 north to a dead end in Worcester County, paralleling US 50 to the north. The route is 0.28 miles (0.45 km) long. MD 992F originally ran from US 50 north to the dead end; it was extended south to MD 346 in 2012.

Browse numbered routes
← MD 991	→ MD 993

== MD 993 ==
Maryland Route 993
- Location: Lansdowne
- Length: 0.04 mi (64 m)

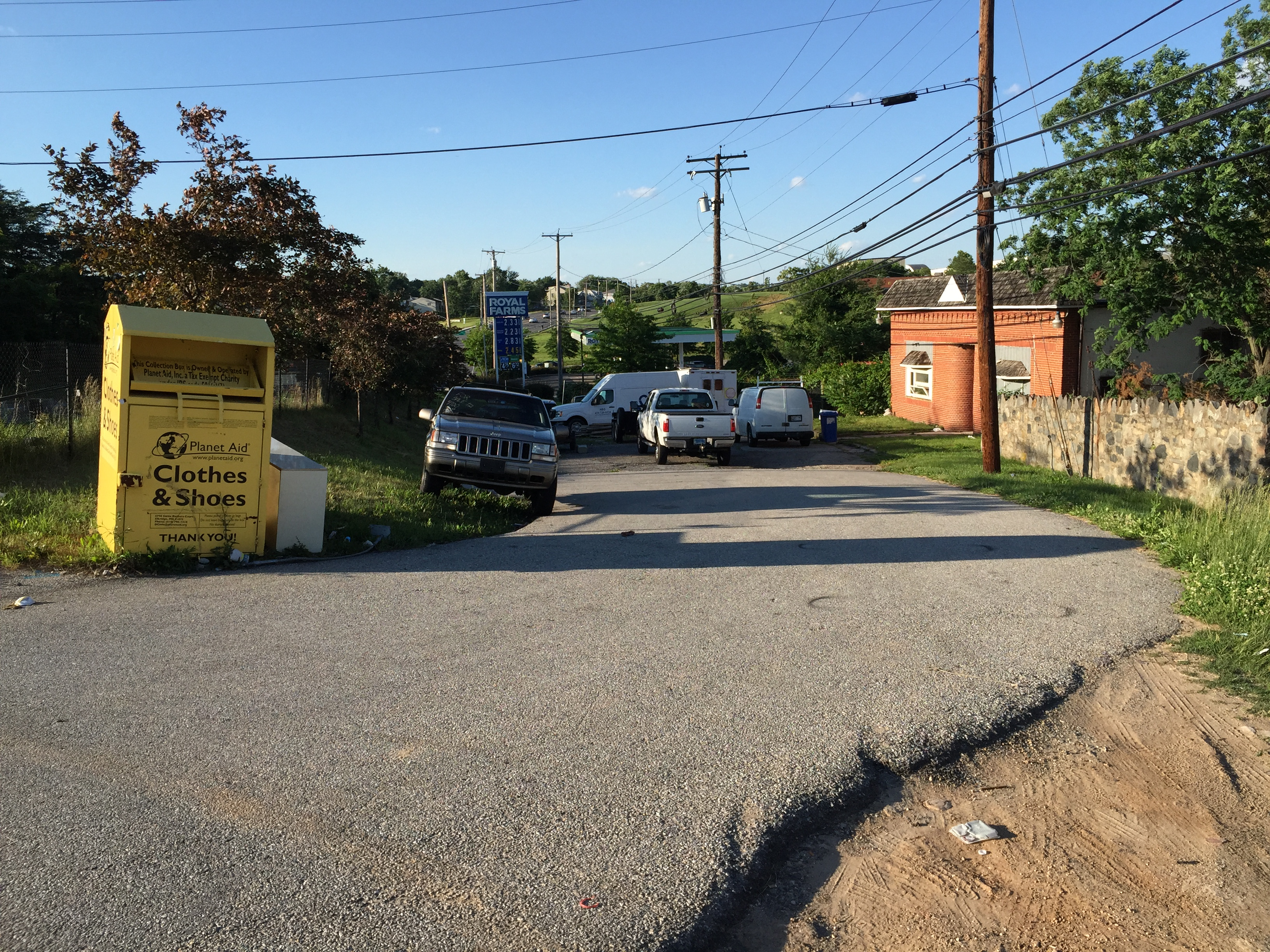
MD 993 at US 1 Alt. in Lansdowne

Maryland Route 993B is the unsigned designation for an unnamed road running from US 1 Alternate north to a dead end in Lansdowne, Baltimore County. The route is 0.04 mi (0.064 km) long.

Browse numbered routes
← MD 992	→ MD 995

== MD 995 ==
Maryland Route 995
- Location: Linthicum
- Length: 0.50 mi (800 m)

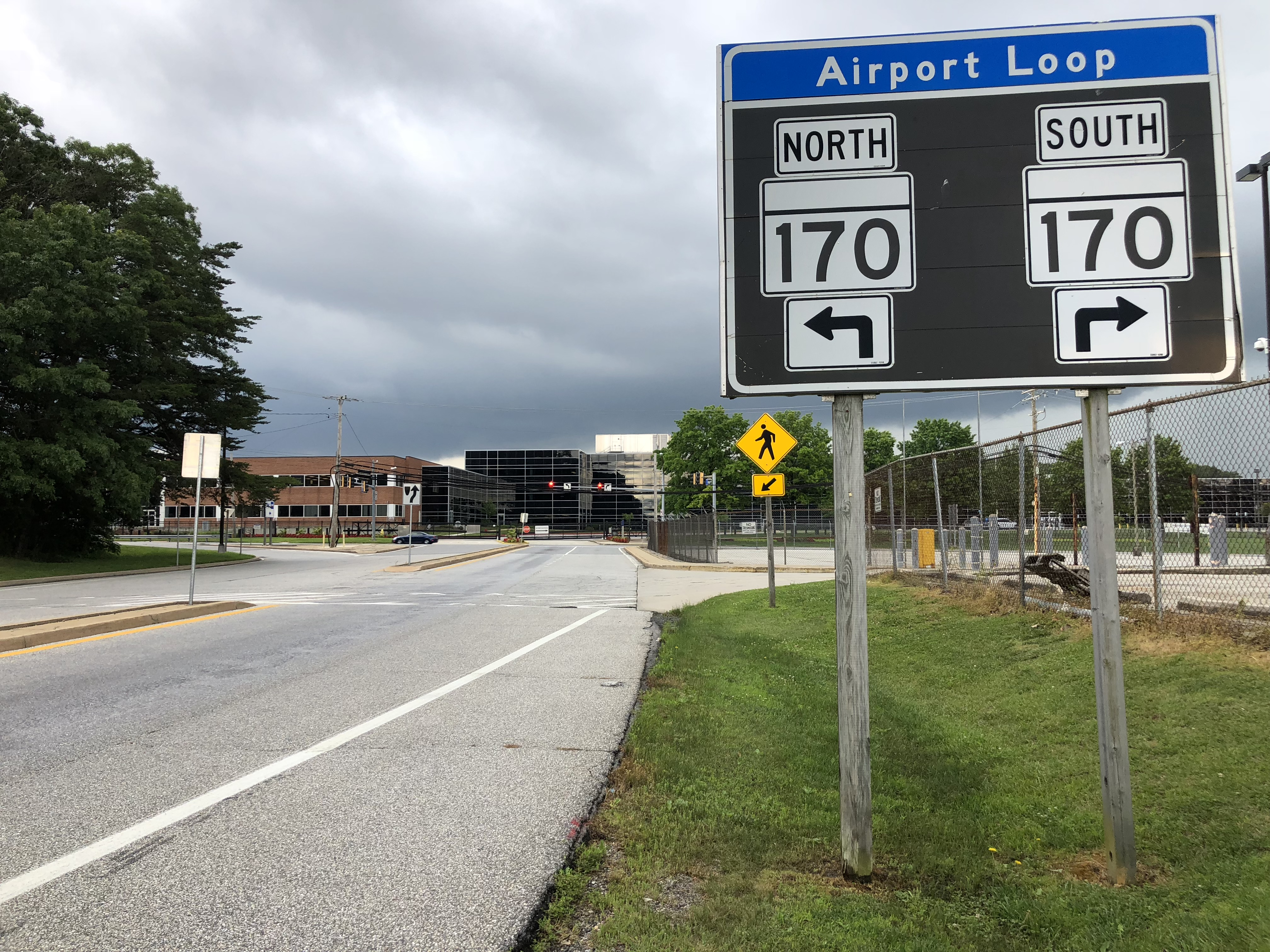
View south approaching the south end of MD 995 at MD 170 in Linthicum

Maryland Route 995 is the unsigned designation for Amtrak Way, running from MD 170 north to a dead end at the BWI Rail Station serving Amtrak's Northeast Corridor and MARC's Penn Line in Linthicum, Anne Arundel County. The route is 0.50 mi (0.80 km) long.

- MD 995A was the unsigned designation for the section of four-lane limited access Metropolitan Boulevard from the entrance to the Baltimore–Washington International Airport north to an interchange with MD 170, where the roadway becomes I-195, in Linthicum, Anne Arundel County. The route was 0.36 mi (0.58 km) long. MD 995A was designated in 2015, replacing the previous I-195 designation along this stretch of road. The route was transferred to the Maryland Aviation Administration in an agreement dated December 10, 2019.

Browse numbered routes
← MD 993	→ MD 997

== MD 997 ==
Maryland Route 997
- Location: Anne Arundel County

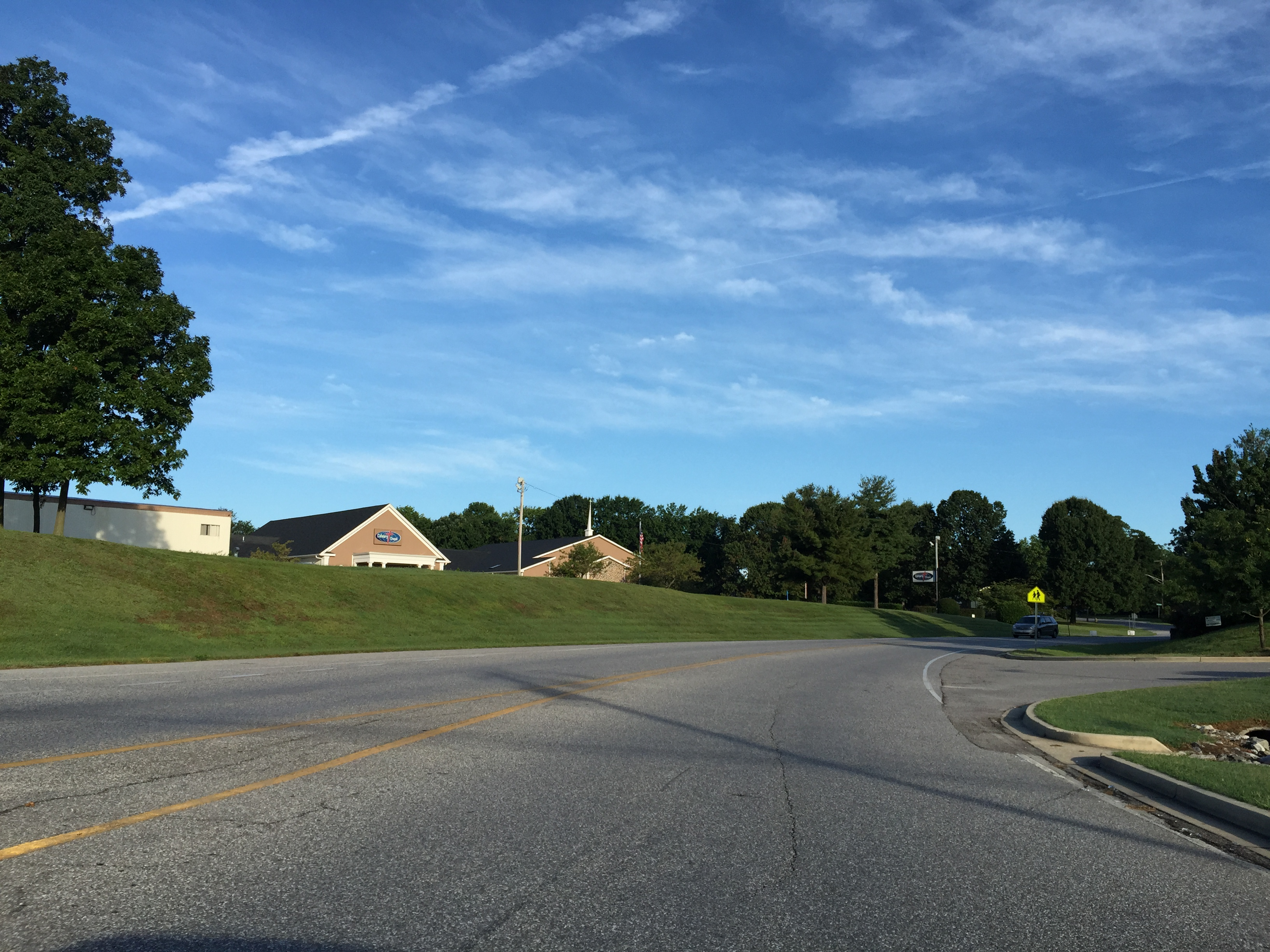
View north along MD 997E at MD 3 Bus. in Hanover

Maryland Route 997 is the unsigned designation for three stretches of road in Anne Arundel County:

- MD 997D runs along Service Road from Morris Tongue Road northwest to Jabez Run in Millersville, passing under I-97 and MD 3. The route is 0.29 mi (0.47 km) long.
- MD 997E runs along a portion of Stevenson Road from the beginning of state maintenance east to MD 3 Business in Hanover. The route is 0.16 mi (0.26 km) long.
- MD 997F runs along Carver Road within the median of MD 3 in Gambrills. The route is 0.066 mi (0.106 km) and was designated in 2018.

Browse numbered routes
← MD 995	→ MD 998

== MD 998 ==
Maryland Route 998
- Location: Burtonsville
- Length: 0.08 mi (130 m)

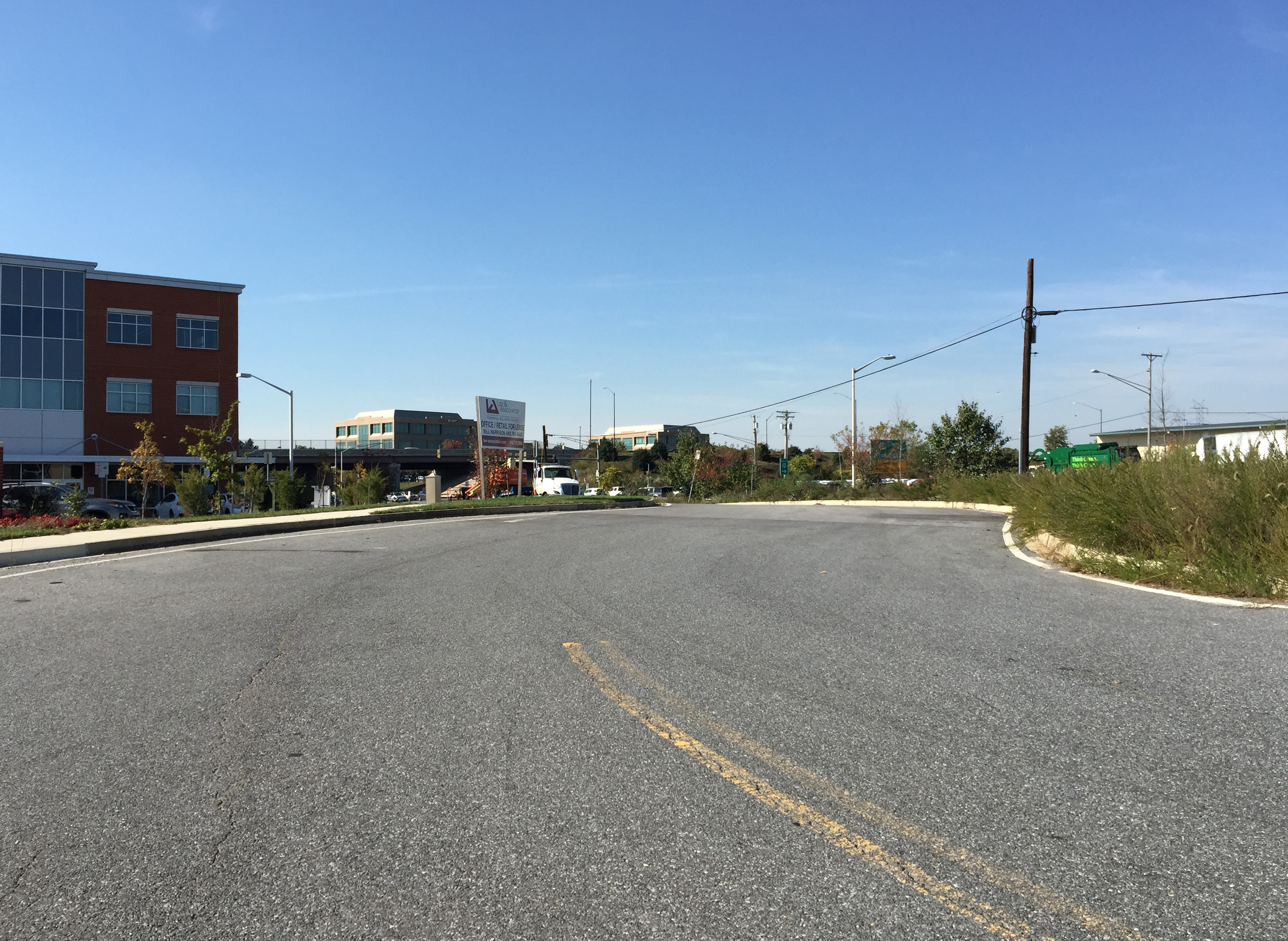
View west along MD 998A in Burtonsville

Maryland Route 998A is the unsigned designation for MD 198 Service Road, running from the beginning of state maintenance east to Star Point Lane in Burtonsville, Montgomery County. The route is 0.08 mi (0.13 km) long.

Browse numbered routes
← MD 997	→ US 1
