= Uspenovka =

Uspenovka may refer to:

- Uspenovka, Kazakhstan
- Uspenovka, former name for Jerge-Tal, Jalal-Abad, Kyrgyzstan
- in Russia:
  - Uspenovka, Altai Krai
  - Uspenovka, Belogorsky District, Amur Oblast, a village in Belogorsky District
  - Uspenovka, Bureysky District, Amur Oblast, a village in Bureysky District
  - Uspenovka, Ivanovsky District, Amur Oblast, a village in Ivanovsky District
  - Uspenovka, Zavitinsky District, Amur Oblast, a village in Zavitinsky District
  - Uspenovka, Republic of Bashkortostan
