= List of highways numbered 18 =

Route 18, or Highway 18, may refer to:

== International ==
- AH18 Asian Highway 18
- E18 European route E18
- E018 European route E018

== Argentina ==
- RN 18

== Australia ==
- Waterfall Way

== Canada ==
- Alberta Highway 18
- British Columbia Highway 18
- Manitoba Highway 18
- Ontario Highway 18 (former)
- Prince Edward Island Route 18
- Saskatchewan Highway 18

== China ==
- G18 Expressway

== Costa Rica ==
- National Route 18

== Cuba ==
- Highway 2–18

== Czech Republic ==
- I/18 Highway; Czech: Silnice I/18

== Greece ==
- EO18 road (1963–1995; now numbered the EO19)

== India ==
- National Highway 18 (India)

== Iran ==
- Road 18

== Ireland ==
- M18 motorway (Ireland)
- N18 road (Ireland)

== Italy ==
- Autostrada A18
- State road 18

== Japan ==
- Japan National Route 18
- Jōshin-etsu Expressway

== Korea, South ==
- National Route 18

== Malaysia ==
- Kajang Dispersal Link Expressway
- FT 18 Malaysia Federal Route 18

== New Zealand ==
- New Zealand State Highway 18

== Paraguay ==
- National Route 18

== Poland ==
- Motorway A18
- National road 18

== Russia ==
- M18 motorway (Russia) running from Saint Petersburg to Murmansk

== South Africa ==
- N18 road (South Africa)

== Ukraine ==
- Highway M18 (Ukraine)

== United Kingdom ==
- British A18 (Doncaster-Ludborough)
- British M18 (Thurcroft-Rawcliffe)

== United States ==
- U.S. Route 18
- New England Route 18 (former)
- Alabama State Route 18
  - County Route 18 (Lee County, Alabama)
- Arkansas Highway 18
- California State Route 18
  - County route A18 (California)
  - County Route E18 (California)
  - County Route G18 (California)
  - County Route J18 (California)
  - County Route S18 (California)
- Colorado State Highway 18 (pre-1968) (former)
- Delaware Route 18
- Florida State Road 18
  - County Road 18 (Bradford County, Florida)
  - County Road 18 (Columbia County, Florida)
  - County Road 18 (Union County, Florida)
- Georgia State Route 18
- Hawaii Route 18 (former)
- Illinois Route 18
- Indiana State Road 18
- K-18 (Kansas highway)
- Kentucky Route 18
- Louisiana Highway 18
- Maine State Route 18 (former)
- Maryland Route 18
- Massachusetts Route 18
- M-18 (Michigan highway)
- Minnesota State Highway 18
  - County Road 18 (Anoka County, Minnesota)
  - County Road 18 (Scott County, Minnesota)
  - County Road 18 (Washington County, Minnesota)
- Mississippi Highway 18
- Missouri Route 18
- Nebraska Highway 18
- Nevada State Route 18 (former)
- New Hampshire Route 18
- New Jersey Route 18
  - New Jersey Route 18N (former)
  - County Route 18 (Monmouth County, New Jersey)
- New Mexico State Road 18
- New York State Route 18
  - County Route 18 (Allegany County, New York)
  - County Route 18 (Chautauqua County, New York)
  - County Route 18 (Columbia County, New York)
  - County Route 18 (Dutchess County, New York)
  - County Route 18 (Erie County, New York)
  - County Route 18 (Essex County, New York)
  - County Route 18 (Herkimer County, New York)
  - County Route 18 (Onondaga County, New York)
  - County Route 18 (Ontario County, New York)
  - County Route 18 (Orange County, New York)
  - County Route 18 (Orleans County, New York)
  - County Route 18 (Otsego County, New York)
  - County Route 18 (Rensselaer County, New York)
  - County Route 18 (Schoharie County, New York)
  - County Route 18 (Schuyler County, New York)
  - County Route 18 (Steuben County, New York)
  - County Route 18 (Suffolk County, New York)
  - County Route 18 (Tioga County, New York)
  - County Route 18 (Washington County, New York)
  - County Route 18 (Westchester County, New York)
  - County Route 18 (Yates County, New York)
- North Carolina Highway 18
- North Dakota Highway 18
- Ohio State Route 18
- Oklahoma State Highway 18
  - Oklahoma State Highway 18B
- Oregon Route 18
- Pennsylvania Route 18
- South Carolina Highway 18
- South Dakota Highway 18 (former)
- Tennessee State Route 18
- Texas State Highway 18
  - Farm to Market Road 18
  - Ranch to Market Road 18 (former)
- Utah State Route 18
- Vermont Route 18
- Virginia State Route 18
- Washington State Route 18
  - Primary State Highway 18 (Washington) (former)
- West Virginia Route 18
- Wisconsin Highway 18 (former)

Territories

- Guam Highway 18
- Puerto Rico Highway 18

== Zambia ==
- M18 road (Zambia)

== See also ==
- List of A18 roads
- List of M18 roads
- List of highways numbered 18A
- List of highways numbered 18B
- List of highways numbered 18C
- List of highways numbered 18D
- List of highways numbered 18E
- List of highways numbered 18F
- Highway 18, a Golf Channel series similar to The Amazing Race

Preceded by 17	Lists of highways 18	Succeeded by 19
