= 883 (disambiguation) =

883 may refer to:

- 883 the Common Era year
- 883 (number), the number
- 883 (band), an Italian pop rock band
- +883, a country calling code
- 883 Matterania, an asteroid

== See also ==
- List of highways numbered 883
