= 717 (disambiguation) =

717 may refer to:

- 717 BC: a year.
- 717: a year.
- Boeing 717
  - Boeing 717, an airliner, the former MD-95
  - Boeing 720, an airliner designated as the 717 during development
  - Boeing C-135 Stratolifter, internal Boeing product code of 717
- 717 (number): a number.
- Area code 717, for telephones in southern Pennsylvania under the North American Numbering Plan
- British Rail Class 717, a train for services from London's Moorgate station

== See also ==
- List of highways numbered 717
