= 959 (disambiguation) =

959 may refer to:

== Years and Numbers ==
- 959, year (AD)
- 959 BC, year
- 959 (number)

== Automobiles ==
- Porsche 959, sports car (in production 1986–1993)
- Ducati 959, motorcycle (currently in production)

== See also ==
- List of highways numbered 959
