= 545 (disambiguation) =

545 may refer to:

- the year 545 AD
- the year 545 BC
- 545, a 2002 live album by Chris Tomlin
- a highway numbered 545 (see list)
