= 767 =

767 may refer to:

- Boeing 767, a jet airliner
- 767 (number)
- AD 767, a year in the 8th century
- 767 BC, a year in the 8th century BC
- Area code 767, an area code of the Commonwealth of Dominica
- 767, the reserved exchange for 767-2676 or POPCORN, the time of day service in northern California

== See also ==
- List of highways numbered 767
