= Cypress Street =

Cypress Street or Cypress St can refer to:

- Cypress Street Viaduct, in Oakland, California
- Cypress Street, near Brookline Hills station in Brookline, Massachusetts
- Cypress Street, bordering the neighborhood of Algonquin, Louisville, Kentucky
- Cypress Street, bordering the neighborhood of Carver City-Lincoln Gardens in Hillsborough, Florida
- Maryland Route 291, signed as "Cypress Street" in Millington, Virginia
- SR 764, signed as "Cypress Street" in Scott County, Virginia
