= SH850 =

SH850 or variation may refer to:

- Norgestrel, a medication used in birth control pills
- List of highways numbered 850, state highways numbered 850
