= SH 881 =

SH 881 may refer to:

- Cyproterone, a steroidal antiandrogen
- State highway 881, state highways numbered 881
