= 741 (disambiguation) =

741 may refer to:

- 741, a year in the 8th century
- 741 BC, a year in the 8th century BC
- 741 (number)
- The 741 operational amplifier integrated circuit
- March 741, a Formula One racing car

== See also ==
- List of highways numbered 741
