= 757 =

757 may refer to:

- Boeing 757, a narrow-body airliner
- AD 757, a year
- 757 BC, a year
- 757 (number), a number
- Area code 757, a North American telephone dialling code
- "757", a song by 100 Gecs from 10,000 Gecs
- The 757, a nickname for the Hampton Roads region

== See also ==
- List of highways numbered 757
