= 775 (disambiguation) =

775 may refer to:

- 775, year
- Area code 775
- Code page 775
- LGA 775, Intel socket

== See also ==
- List of highways numbered 775
