= 965 (disambiguation) =

965 was a year.

965 may also refer to:

- 965th Airborne Air Control Squadron
- 965 Angelica

== See also ==
- List of highways numbered 965
