= 968 (disambiguation) =

968 was a year.

968 may also refer to:

- The car, Porsche 968
- The car, Zaporozhets, also known as 968
- The international calling code for Oman

== See also ==
- List of highways numbered 968
