= 868 (disambiguation) =

868 may refer to:

- 868 (number), a number
- 868, a year in the Common Era
- Area code 868, area code for Trinidad and Tobago in the North American Numbering Plan
- 868 MHz-band (863–870 MHz), a radio frequency band used by devices such as thermostats, fire systems, burglar systems, and DIN-transceivers; see Short-range device

== See also ==
- List of highways numbered 868
