= 873 (disambiguation) =

873 is a year, 873 AD. 873 may also refer to:

- 873 (number)
- 873, an area code for western regions of the Canadian province of Quebec

== See also ==
- List of highways numbered 873
