= List of highways numbered 941 =

The following highways are/were numbered 941:

== Ireland ==
- R941 regional road

== United States ==
- SR 941 (former)
- LA 941
- PA 941
- PR-941
- FM 941

Preceded by 940	Lists of highways 941	Succeeded by 942
