= Florida State Road 989 =

State highway in Miami-Dade County, Florida, United States

State Road 989
- Allapattah Road; Southwest 112th Avenue
- SR 989 highlighted in red

Route information
- Maintained by FDOT
- Length: 3.032 mi (4.880 km)
- Existed: 1945 (as SR 909)–present

Major junctions
- South end: Florida's Turnpike Extension in Princeton
- North end: US 1 in Cutler Bay

Location
- Country: United States
- State: Florida
- Counties: Miami-Dade

Highway system
- Florida State Highway System; Interstate; US; State; Former; Pre‑1945; Toll; Scenic
← SR 988	→ SR 990

State Road 989 (SR 989), locally known as Allapattah Road and Southwest 112th Avenue, is a 3.0-mile-long (4.8 km) north–south four lane undivided highway in southern Miami-Dade County, Florida, United States, that connects Homestead Air Reserve Base and Cutler Bay. SR 989 begins at an interchange with the Homestead Extension of Florida's Turnpike and ends at an intersection with the Dixie Highway (US 1).

== Route description ==
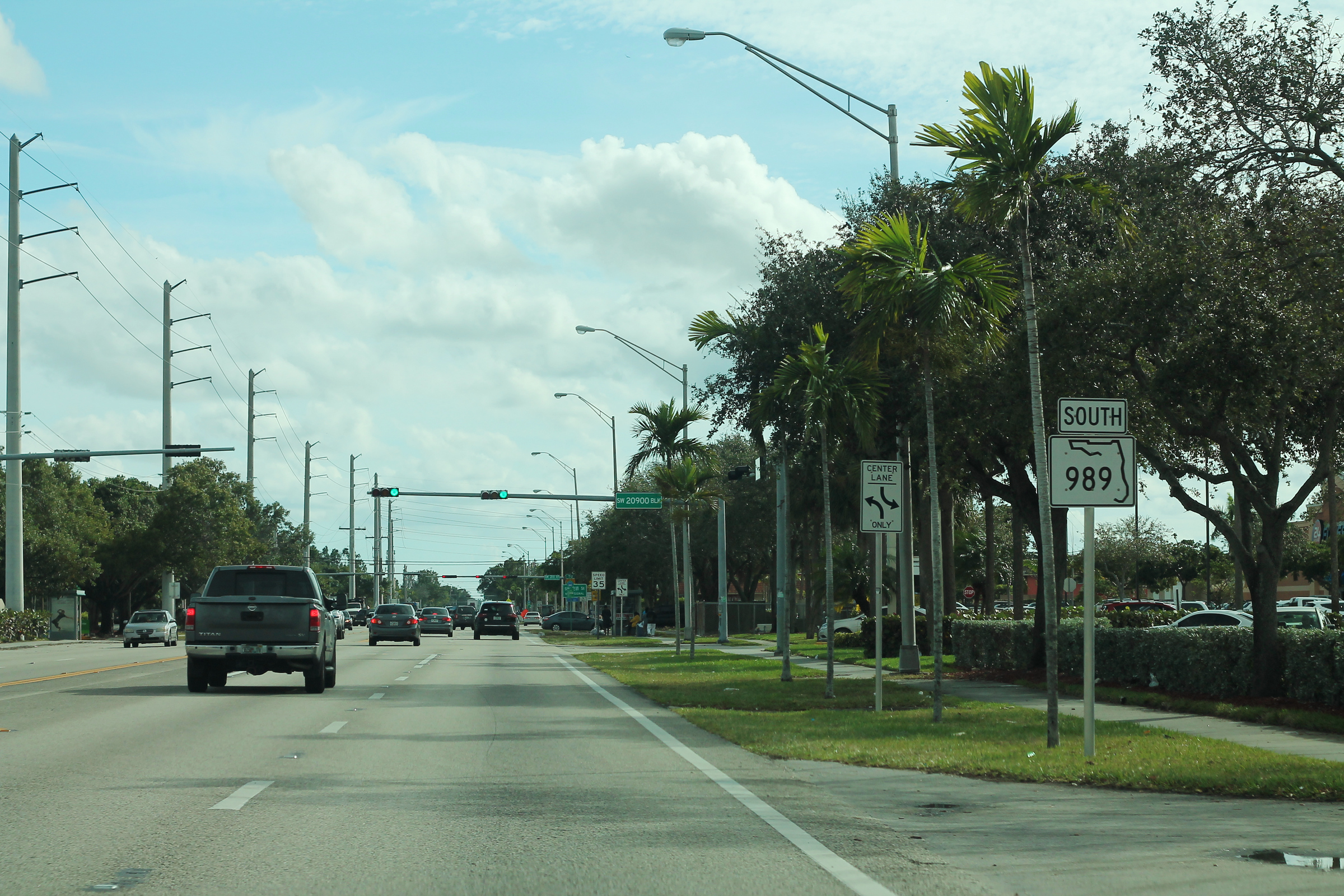
Florida State Road 989 near U.S. Route 1, January 2018

SR 989 begins at a diamond interchange with the Homestead Extension of Florida's Turnpike (HEFT), on the southern edge of Princeton, and proceeds north, maintaining this orientation for its entire course. Starting amongst farmland (as of March 2011), SR 989 only travels one block north before reaching suburbia, and remains within residential neighbourhoods for most of its subsequent journey. After passing through Goulds north of Southwest 224th Street, SR 989 crosses Black Creek Canal and forms the western boundary of Cutler Bay, a little over 2.5 miles (4.0 km) north of the interchange. Soon the road passes to the west of the Southland Mall, a major shopping mall formerly known as Cutler Ridge Mall. SR 989 and Allapattah Road end at the mall's northwestern corner, at an oblique intersection with the South Dixie Highway (US 1).

South of the interchange, Southwest 112th Avenue continues south, remaining as a four-laned undivided highway as far as Moody Drive (Southwest 268th Street). It then turns into a two-laned farm access road and continues south to the Homestead Air Reserve Base, terminating near its northeastern corner. It resumes on the other side of the airfield on the same alignment and continues south from Southwest 301st Street to Southwest 320th Street amidst farmland, a distance of 1.3 miles (2.1 km), as a two-laned access road.

== History ==
Since its initial designation (as SR 909) in 1945, the configuration and importance of the State Road reflected the importance of Homestead Air Force Base. The original route extended southward to an intersection with Waldin Drive (South 280th Street) to provide an eastern entrance to the base housing area as the base was being reconstructed after being seriously damaged by a 1945 hurricane (the base was deeded over to Dade County for eight years; the United States Department of Defense resumed control of the base in 1953 and started to rebuild it).

By the late 1960s, the State Road was realigned to Moody Drive to provide increased access to the base's two northern entrance gates as the increasing intensity of the Cold War and the rise to power of Fidel Castro in nearby Cuba amplified the importance of Homestead Air Force Base to the national security of the United States. The eastern gate was closed and removed. At some point between the realignment and the mid-1970s the road was redesignated SR 989 (the old number was subsequently applied to West Dixie Highway in North Miami in 1983).

Since Hurricane Andrew and subsequent closure of Homestead Air Force Base, SR 989 was truncated to the corner of Allapattah Road and Moody Drive (a handful of SR 989 signs remained on Moody Drive as late as 2002); afterwards, there was another truncation to the Turnpike.

In 1999, the Miami-Dade County Board of County Commissioners accepted a proposal for extending a four-lane Allapattah Road southward to intersect with an extended four-lane Biscayne Drive (South 288th Street), itself Former State Road 579. While the latter has since been resurfaced, there has been no further action on this matter as the developer of the area, Homestead Air Base Developers, Inc. (HABDI), was embroiled in a controversy that effectively killed the plan.

== Major intersections ==
The entire route is in Miami-Dade County.

Location	mi	km	Destinations	Notes
Princeton	0.000	0.000	Florida's Turnpike Extension / Southwest 112th Avenue south	Exits 9A-B on Turnpike Extension
Cutler Bay	3.032	4.880	US 1 (Dixie Highway) to Florida's Turnpike Extension	
1.000 mi = 1.609 km; 1.000 km = 0.621 mi: Electronic toll collection

== See also ==
- List of state highways in Florida
- List of highways numbered 989
