= List of highways numbered 692 =

The following highways are numbered 692:

== United States ==
- SR 692 (former)
- PA 692 (former)
- PR-692
- FM 692

Preceded by 691	Lists of highways 692	Succeeded by 693
