= List of highways numbered 680 =

The following highways are numbered 680.

== Canada ==
- Alberta Highway 680
- Saskatchewan Highway 680

== United States ==
- Interstate 680
- California State Route 680 (former)
- Ohio State Route 680 (1930s-1960s) (former)

Territories

- Puerto Rico Highway 680

Preceded by 679	Lists of highways 680	Succeeded by 681
