= List of highways numbered 484 =

The following highways are numbered 484:

== Ireland ==
- R484 regional road

== Japan ==
- Japan National Route 484

== Spain ==
- Autovía A-484

== United States ==
- Interstate 484 (cancelled)
- Kentucky Route 484
- Maryland Route 484 (former)
- Pennsylvania Route 484
- Puerto Rico Highway 484
- Texas State Highway Loop 484

Preceded by 483	Lists of highways 484	Succeeded by 485
