= European route E018 =

Road in trans-European E-road network

E018

Route information
- Length: 1,052 km (654 mi)

Major junctions
- From: Zhezkazgan
- Karagandy, Pavlodar
- To: Uspenka

Location
- Countries: Kazakhstan

Highway system
- International E-road network; A Class; B Class

E018 is a European class B road in Kazakhstan connecting the cities Zhezkazgan – Karagandy - Pavlodar - Uspenka.

In the International E-road network, a class B road is a branch, link or connecting road of or between two or more class A main roads. In this case the E018 is a connecting road between the main international roads E123 (in city Zhezkazgan), E125 (in city Karagandy), and E127 (in city Pavlodar).

E123 makes the route Tsjeljabinsk (Russia) - Kostanay (Kazakhstan) - Zapadnoje - Boezoeloek - Derzjavinsk - Arkalyk - Zjezkazgan - Kyzylorda - Shymkent - Tashkent (Uzbekistan) - Aini - Dushanbe (Tajikistan)- Nizhny Pyanj.

E125 makes the route Ishim (Russia) - Petropavlovsk (Kazakhstan)- Kokshetau - Shchuchinsk - Nur-Sultan - Karagandy - Balkhash - Burubaytal - Almaty - Bishkek (Kyrgyzstan)- Naryn - Torugart.

E127 makes the route Omsk (Russia) - Pavlodar (Kazakhstan) - Semey - Georgiyevka - Maikapshagai.
