= List of highways numbered 3E =

The following highways are numbered 3E:

== United States ==
- Georgia State Route 3E (Atlanta–Marietta) (former)
- Georgia State Route 3E (Thomaston) (former)
- New York State Route 3E (former)
- Oklahoma State Highway 3E
- Secondary State Highway 3E (Washington) (former)
