= List of highways numbered 974 =

The following highways are numbered 974:

== United States ==
- SR 974 (former)
- LA 974 (former)
- MD 974
- PR-974
- FM 974

Preceded by 973	Lists of highways 974	Succeeded by 975
