= List of highways numbered 795 =

Route 795 or Highway 795 may refer to:

== Canada ==
- Alberta Highway 795
- Saskatchewan Highway 795

== United States ==
- Interstate 795 (disambiguation)
- Maryland Route 795
- Nevada State Route 795
- Ohio State Route 795
- Puerto Rico Highway 795

Preceded by 794	Lists of highways 795	Succeeded by 796
