= List of highways numbered 490 =

The following highways are numbered 490:

== Canada ==
- Manitoba Provincial Road 490
- New Brunswick Route 490
- Newfoundland and Labrador Route 490

== Japan ==
- Japan National Route 490

== United States ==
- Interstate 490 (disambiguation)
- Florida State Road 490
- County Road 490 (Citrus County, Florida)
  - County Road 490A (Citrus County, Florida)
- Louisiana Highway 490
- Maryland Route 490
- Nevada State Route 490
- Puerto Rico Highway 490

Preceded by 489	Lists of highways 490	Succeeded by 491
