= List of highways numbered 695 =

The following highways are numbered 695:

== Canada ==
- Alberta Highway 695
- New Brunswick Route 695
- Saskatchewan Highway 695

== United States ==
- Interstate 695 (disambiguation)
- Connecticut State Road 695 (unsigned, part of the Connecticut Turnpike)
- New York State Route 695

Territories

- Puerto Rico Highway 695

Preceded by 694	Lists of highways 695	Succeeded by 696
