= List of highways numbered 635 =

Route 635, or Highway 635, may refer to:

== Canada ==
- New Brunswick Route 635
- Saskatchewan Highway 635

== United Kingdom ==
- A635 road

== United States ==
- Interstate 635
- LA 635
- NY 635
- SR 635
- PR-635
- FM 635
- SR 635
- WV 635

Preceded by 634	Lists of highways 635	Succeeded by 636
