= List of highways numbered 983 =

The following highways are numbered 983:

== Canada ==
- Highway 983

== United States ==
- LA 983
- MD 983 (former)
- PR-983
- FM 983

Preceded by 982	Lists of highways 983	Succeeded by 984
