= List of highways numbered 837 =

The following highways are numbered 837:

== Ireland ==
- R837 regional road

== United States ==
- County Road 837 (Collier County, Florida)
- LA 837
- MD 837
- PA 837
- PR-837
- FM 837

Preceded by 836	Lists of highways 837	Succeeded by 838
