= List of highways numbered 76C =

Route 76C or Highway 76C may refer to:

== United States ==
- Interstate 76 Connector (unsigned)
- Nebraska Spur 76C
- Route 76C
