= List of highways numbered 851 =

The following highways are numbered 851:

== United States ==
- LA 851
- MD 851
- PA 851
- PR-851
- FM 851

Preceded by 850	Lists of highways 851	Succeeded by 852
