= List of highways numbered 596 =

The following highways are numbered 596:

== United States ==
- LA 596
- PR-596
- FM 596

== Other places ==
- Highway 596

Preceded by 595	Lists of highways 596	Succeeded by 597
