= List of highways numbered 538 =

The following highways are numbered 538:

== United Kingdom ==
- A538 road

== United States ==
- SR 538
- LA 538
- PR-538
- FM 538
- SR 538

Preceded by 537	Lists of highways 538	Succeeded by 539
