= List of highways numbered 660 =

Route 660, or Highway 660, may refer to:

== Canada ==
- Saskatchewan Highway 660

== Ireland ==
- R660 road (Ireland)

== United Kingdom ==
- A660 road

== United States ==
- California State Route 660 (future)
- Nevada State Route 660 (former)
- Ohio State Route 660
- Pennsylvania Route 660
- Puerto Rico Highway 660

Preceded by 659	Lists of highways 660	Succeeded by 661
