= List of highways numbered 986 =

The following highways are numbered 986:

== Canada ==
- Highway 986

== United States ==
- SR 986
- LA 986
- MD 986
- PR-986
- FM 986

Preceded by 985	Lists of highways 986	Succeeded by 987
