= List of highways numbered 888 =

The following highways are numbered 888:

== Israel ==
- Route 888 (Israel)

== United States ==
- Florida State Road 888
- Louisiana Highway 888
- Pennsylvania Route 888
- Puerto Rico Highway 888
- Texas Farm-to-Market Road 888

Preceded by 887	Lists of highways 888	Succeeded by 889
