= Autovía A-484 =

Highway in Andalusia, Spain

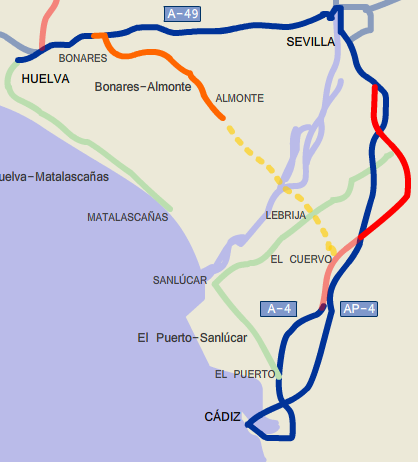
Map showing the A-484 route from Cádiz to Huelva

The Autovía A-484 is a highway in Spain. It passes through Andalusia, from Arcos to Antequera.
