= List of highways numbered 935 =

The following highways are numbered 935:

== Costa Rica ==
- National Route 935

== Ireland ==
- R935 regional road

== United States ==
- LA 935
- MD 935
- PR-935
- FM 935

| Preceded by 934 | Lists of highways 935 | Succeeded by 936 |
