= List of highways numbered 812 =

The following highways are numbered 812:

== Canada ==
- Alberta Highway 812
- Highway 812 (Ontario) (former)

== Costa Rica ==
- National Route 812

== United States ==
- AR 812
- SR 812
- NY 812
- PR-812
- FM 812

Preceded by 811	Lists of highways 812	Succeeded by 813
