= List of highways numbered 634 =

The following highways are numbered 634:

== Canada ==
- Highway 634

== Spain ==
- N-634 road (Spain)

== United States ==
- SR 634
- PR-634
- FM 634
- SR 634

Preceded by 633	Lists of highways 634	Succeeded by 635
