= List of highways numbered 579 =

The following highways are numbered 579:

== Canada ==
- Alberta Highway 579
- Manitoba Provincial Road 579
- Ontario Highway 579

== United States ==
- I-579
- MD 579
- SR 579
- CR 579
- SR 579

Preceded by 578	Lists of highways 579	Succeeded by 580
