= List of highways numbered 645 =

The following highways are numbered 645:

== United States ==
- LA 645
- MD 645
- PA 645
- PR-645
- FM 645

Preceded by 644	Lists of highways 645	Succeeded by 646
