= List of highways numbered 632 =

The following highways are numbered 632:

== United Kingdom ==
- A632 road

== United States ==
- MD 632
- PA 632
- PR-632
- FM 632
- SR 632

Preceded by 631	Lists of highways 632	Succeeded by 633
