= List of highways numbered 860 =

The following highways are numbered 860:

== Canada ==
- Highway 860
- Route 860

== United States ==
- SR 860
- SR 860
- PR-860
- FM 860

Preceded by 859	Lists of highways 860	Succeeded by 861
