= List of highways numbered 976 =

The following highways are numbered 976:

== United States ==
- SR 976
- LA 976
- MD 976
- PR-976
- FM 976

Preceded by 975	Lists of highways 976	Succeeded by 977
