= List of highways numbered 719 =

The following highways are numbered 719:

== Costa Rica ==
- National Route 719

== India ==
- National Highway 719 (India)

== United States ==
- LA 719
- SR 719
- PR-719
- FM 719

Preceded by 718	Lists of highways 719	Succeeded by 720
