= List of highways numbered 930 =

The following highways are/were numbered 930:

== Costa Rica ==
- National Route 930

== Ireland ==
- R930 regional road

== United States ==
- SR 930 (former)
- SR 930
- LA 930 (former)
- PA 930 (former)
- PR-930
- FM 930

Preceded by 929	Lists of highways 930	Succeeded by 931
