= List of highways numbered 989 =

Route 989, or Highway 989, may refer to:

== Australia ==
C989 - Wells Road (Victoria)

== United Kingdom ==
- A989

== United States ==
- SR 989
- SR 989
- LA 989
  - LA 989-1
  - LA 989-2
- MD 989
- PA 989
- PR-989
- FM 989

Preceded by 988	Lists of highways 989	Succeeded by 990
