= List of highways numbered 932 =

The following highways are/were numbered 932:

== Ireland ==
- R932 regional road

== United States ==
- SR 932
- LA 932 (former)
- MD 932
- PA 932 (former)
- PR-932
- FM 932

| Preceded by 931 | Lists of highways 932 | Succeeded by 933 |
