= List of highways numbered 854 =

The following highways are numbered 854:

== United States ==
- SR 854 (former)
- LA 854
- MD 854
- SR 854
- PA 854 (former)
- PR-854
- FM 854

Preceded by 853	Lists of highways 854	Succeeded by 855
