= List of highways numbered 861 =

The following highways are numbered 861:

== United States ==
- LA 861
- PA 861
- PR-861
- FM 861

| Preceded by 860 | Lists of highways 861 | Succeeded by 862 |
