= List of highways numbered 718 =

The following highways are numbered 718:

== Costa Rica ==
- National Route 718

== United States ==
- SR 718
- PA 718
- PR-718
- FM 718
- SR 718

Preceded by 717	Lists of highways 718	Succeeded by 719
