= List of highways numbered 624 =

The following highways are numbered 624:

== Costa Rica ==
- National Route 624

== United States ==
- Pennsylvania Route 624
- PR-624
- SR 624

Preceded by 623	Lists of highways 624	Succeeded by 625
