= List of highways numbered 984 =

The following highways are numbered 984:

== Canada ==
- Highway 984

== United States ==
- LA 984
- MD 984
- PA 984
- PR-984
- FM 984

Preceded by 983	Lists of highways 984	Succeeded by 985
