= List of highways numbered 735 =

The following highways are numbered 735:

== Costa Rica ==
- National Route 735

== United States ==
Ohio

- Ohio State Route 735

Territories

- Puerto Rico Highway 735

Preceded by 734	Lists of highways 735	Succeeded by 736
