= List of highways numbered 962 =

The following highways are numbered 962:

== United States ==
- LA 962 (former)
- PA 962 (former)
- PR-962

Preceded by 961	Lists of highways 962	Succeeded by 963
