= List of highways numbered 880 =

The following highways are numbered 880:

== United States ==
- I-880
  - I-880 (former)
- I-880
- SR 880
- LA 880
- MD 880 (former)
- PA 880
- PR-880
- FM 880

Preceded by 879	Lists of highways 880	Succeeded by 881
