= List of highways numbered 18F =

The following highways are numbered 18F:

== United States ==
- Nebraska Spur 18F
- New York State Route 18F
  - New York State Route 18F (1934–1938) (former)

== See also ==
- List of highways numbered 18
