= List of highways numbered 685 =

The following highways are numbered 685:

== United States ==
- I-685 (proposed, Alabama)
- I-685 (proposed, North Carolina)
- I-685 (former proposal, South Carolina)
- SR 685
- LA 685
- MD 685 (former)
- PR-685
- FM 685

Preceded by 684	Lists of highways 685	Succeeded by 686
