= List of highways numbered 928 =

The following highways are numbered 928:

== Costa Rica ==
- National Route 928

== United States ==
- LA 928
- MD 928
- PA 928
- PR-928
- FM 928

Preceded by 927	Lists of highways 928	Succeeded by 929
