= List of highways numbered 847 =

The following highways are numbered 847:

== United States ==
- SR 847
- LA 847
- MD 847
- PR-847
- FM 847

Preceded by 846	Lists of highways 847	Succeeded by 848
