= List of highways numbered 619 =

The following highways are numbered 619:

== Costa Rica ==
- National Route 619

== United States ==
- LA 619
- MD 619
- SR 619
- PR-619
- SR 619

Preceded by 618	Lists of highways 619	Succeeded by 620
