= List of highways numbered 740 =

The following highways are numbered 740:

== Cuba ==
- Santiago de las Vegas–Melena del Sur Road (2–740)

== Ireland ==
- R740 regional road

== United States ==
- LA 740
- MD 740
- Route 740
- NC 740
- PR-740
- FM 740

| Preceded by 739 | Lists of highways 740 | Succeeded by 741 |
