= List of highways numbered 708 =

The following highways are numbered 708:

== Costa Rica ==
- National Route 708

== United States ==
- SR 708
- LA 708
- SR 708
- PR-708
- FM 708

| Preceded by 707 | Lists of highways 708 | Succeeded by 709 |
