= List of highways numbered 816 =

The following highways are numbered 816:

== Costa Rica ==
- National Route 816

== Finland ==
- National Highway 816 (Finland)

== United States ==
- AR 816
- SR 816
- LA 816 (former)
- PR-816
- SC 816
- FM 816

Preceded by 815	Lists of highways 816	Succeeded by 817
