= List of highways numbered 474 =

The following highways are numbered 474:

== Canada ==
- Manitoba Provincial Road 474

== Cuba ==
- Santa Clara–Fomento Road (4–474)

== Japan ==
- Japan National Route 474

== United States ==
- Interstate 474
- County Road 474 (Lake County, Florida)
- Maryland Route 474
- New York State Route 474
- Pennsylvania Route 474
- Puerto Rico Highway 474
- Tennessee State Route 474
- Texas:
  - Texas State Highway Spur 474
  - Ranch to Market Road 474

Preceded by 473	Lists of highways 474	Succeeded by 475
