= List of highways numbered 964 =

The following highways are numbered 964:

== Canada ==
- Highway 964

== United States ==
- LA 964
- MD 964
- PA 964 (former)
- PR-964
- FM 964

Preceded by 963	Lists of highways 964	Succeeded by 965
