= List of highways numbered 901 =

The following highways are numbered 901:

== Costa Rica ==
- National Route 901

== United States ==
Hawaii

- Hawaii Route 901
- Pennsylvania Route 901

Territories

- Puerto Rico Highway 901

Preceded by 900	Lists of highways 901	Succeeded by 902
