= List of highways numbered 575 =

The following highways are numbered 575:

== Canada ==
- Highway 575
- Route 575
- Highway 575

== United Kingdom ==
- A575 road

== United States ==
- I-575
- SR 575
- LA 575
- MD 575
- County Route 575 (New Jersey)
- FM 575

Preceded by 574	Lists of highways 575	Succeeded by 576
