= List of highways numbered 946 =

The following highways are numbered 946:

== Cuba ==
- San Nicolas–Madruga Road (2–946)

== United States ==
- LA 946
- MD 946
- PA 946
- PR-946
- FM 946

Preceded by 945	Lists of highways 946	Succeeded by 947
