= List of highways numbered 710 =

The following highways are numbered 710:

== Costa Rica ==
- National Route 710

== United States ==
- I-710
  - I-710 (former proposal)
- SR 710
- MD 710
- PR-710
- FM 710

Preceded by 709	Lists of highways 710	Succeeded by 711
