= List of highways numbered 835 =

The following highways are numbered 835:

== Ireland ==
R835 regional road

== United States ==
- Maryland Route 835
- Ohio State Route 835
- Puerto Rico Highway 835

Preceded by 834	Lists of highways 835	Succeeded by 836
