= List of highways numbered 752 =

The following highways are numbered 752:

== Costa Rica ==
- National Route 752

== United States ==
- SR 752
- LA 752
- MD 752
- Route 752
- PA 752 (former)
- PR-752
- FM 752

| Preceded by 751 | Lists of highways 752 | Succeeded by 753 |
