= List of highways numbered 625 =

The following highways are numbered 625:

== Canada ==
- Route 625

== Costa Rica ==
- National Route 625

== United Kingdom ==
- A625 road

== United States ==
- SR 625
- PA 625
- PR-625
- SR 625

Preceded by 624	Lists of highways 625	Succeeded by 626
