= List of highways numbered 823 =

The following highways are numbered 823:

== United States ==
- SR 823
- LA 823
- MD 823 (former)
- SR 823
- SR 823
- PR-823
- SC 823
- SR 823

Preceded by 822	Lists of highways 823	Succeeded by 824
