= Uspenovka, Ivanovsky District, Amur Oblast =

Uspenovka Успеновка
- Selo
- Location within Amur Oblast Location within Russia
- Coordinates: 50°17′N 128°04′E
- Country: Russia
- Region: Amur Oblast
- District: Ivanovsky District
- Time zone: UTC+9:00

Uspenovka (Russian: Успеновка) is a rural locality (a selo) in Ivanovsky Selsoviet of Ivanovsky District, Amur Oblast, Russia. The population was 363 as of 2018. There are 6 streets.

== Geography ==
Uspenovka is located 11 km southeast of Ivanovka (the district's administrative centre) by road. Kreshchenovka is the nearest rural locality.
