= List of highways numbered 857 =

The following highways are numbered 857:

== United States ==
- LA 857
- MD 857 (former)
- PA 857
- PR-857
- FM 857

Preceded by 856	Lists of highways 857	Succeeded by 858
