= List of highways numbered 867 =

The following highways are numbered 867:

== United States ==
- SR 867
- LA 867
- PA 867
- PR-867
- FM 867

Preceded by 866	Lists of highways 867	Succeeded by 868
