= List of highways numbered 957 =

The following highways are numbered 957:

== United States ==
- LA 957
- PA 957
- PR-957
- FM 957

Preceded by 956	Lists of highways 957	Succeeded by 958
