= List of highways numbered 683 =

The following highways are numbered 683:

== United States ==
- SR 683
- MD 683 (former)
- PR-683
- FM 683

Preceded by 682	Lists of highways 683	Succeeded by 684
