= List of highways numbered 689 =

The following highways are numbered 689:

== United States ==
- LA 689
- PR-689
- FM 689

Preceded by 688	Lists of highways 689	Succeeded by 690
