= List of highways numbered 597 =

Route 597, or Highway 597, may refer to:

== Canada ==
- Alberta Highway 597
- Ontario Highway 597

== United Kingdom ==
- A597 road

== United States ==
- SR 597
- KY 597
- LA 597
- MD 597
- NM 597
- PR-597
- FM 597

Preceded by 596	Lists of highways 597	Succeeded by 598
