= List of highways numbered 18D =

The following highways are numbered 18D:

== United States ==
- Nebraska Spur 18D
- New York State Route 18D (former)

== See also ==
- List of highways numbered 18
