= List of highways numbered 667 =

The following highways are numbered 667:

== Canada ==
- Highway 667

== United States ==
- MD 667
- SR 667
- PR-667
- FM 667
- SR 667

Preceded by 666	Lists of highways 667	Succeeded by 668
