= List of highways numbered 811 =

The following highways are numbered 811:

== Canada ==
- Ontario Highway 811

== Costa Rica ==
- National Route 811

== United States ==
- SR 811
  - County Road 811 (Broward County, Florida)
    - County Road 811A (Broward County, Florida)
- LA 811
- MD 811 (former)
- PR-811
- FM 811

| Preceded by 810 | Lists of highways 811 | Succeeded by 812 |
