= List of highways numbered 662 =

The following highways are numbered 662:

== Canada ==
- Highway 662

== United States ==
- SR 662
- MD 662
- SR 662
- PA 662
- PR-662

Preceded by 661	Lists of highways 662	Succeeded by 663
