= List of highways numbered 777 =

The following highways are numbered 777:

== Australia ==
- McMahons Road

== Canada ==
- Highway 777

== United States ==
- SR 777
- KY 777
- LA 777
- PR-777
- FM 777

Preceded by 776	Lists of highways 777	Succeeded by 778
