= List of highways numbered 709 =

The following highways are numbered 709:

== Canada ==
- Saskatchewan Highway 709

== Costa Rica ==
- National Route 709

== United States ==
- SR 709
- PA 709 (former)
- PR-709
- FM 709

Preceded by 708	Lists of highways 709	Succeeded by 710
