= List of highways numbered 762 =

The following highways are numbered 762:

== Canada ==
- Highway 762

== United States ==
- LA 762 (former)
- MD 762
- SR 762
- PR-762
- FM 762
- SR 762

Preceded by 761	Lists of highways 762	Succeeded by 763
