= List of highways numbered 716 =

The following highways are numbered 716:

== Canada ==
- Highway 716

== Costa Rica ==
- National Route 716

== United States ==
- SR 716
- SR 716
- PR-716
- FM 716

| Preceded by 715 | Lists of highways 716 | Succeeded by 717 |
