= List of highways numbered 902 =

The following highways are numbered 902:

== Costa Rica ==
- National Route 902

== United States ==
- AR 902
- LA 902 (former)
- PA 902
- PR-902
- SC 902 (former)
- FM 902
- SR 902

Preceded by 901	Lists of highways 902	Succeeded by 903
