= List of highways numbered 797 =

The following highways are numbered 797:

== United States ==
- LA 797
- MD 797
- PR-797
- FM 797

Preceded by 796	Lists of highways 797	Succeeded by 798
