= List of highways numbered 833 =

The following highways are numbered 833:

== United States ==
- SR 833 (former)
  - CR 833
- LA 833
- MD 833
- SR 833
- PR-833
- FM 833
- SR 833

Preceded by 832	Lists of highways 833	Succeeded by 834
