= Interstate 795 =

Interstate 795 is the designation for several Interstate Highways in the United States, all related to Interstate 95:

- Interstate 795 (Florida), a planned connector southeast of Jacksonville
- Interstate 795 (Maryland), a spur to Reisterstown
- Interstate 795 (North Carolina), a spur to Goldsboro
