= Interstate 680 =

Interstate 680 may refer to:

- Interstate 680 (California), a connecting freeway between I-80 and I-280 in the San Francisco Bay Area, California
- Interstate 680 (Nebraska–Iowa), a bypass in Omaha, Nebraska
- Interstate 680 (Ohio), a loop through Youngstown, Ohio
- Interstate 676 in Pennsylvania and New Jersey, designated as Interstate 680 back when I-76 was I-80S
