= List of highways numbered 557 =

The following highways are numbered 557:

== United States ==
- SR 557 (former)
- LA 557
- County Route 557 (New Jersey)
- SR 557
- PR-557
- SC 557
- FM 557

== Other places ==
- Highway 557

Preceded by 556	Lists of highways 557	Succeeded by 558
