= List of highways numbered 636 =

The following highways are numbered 636:

== Canada ==
- New Brunswick Route 636
- Saskatchewan Highway 636

== United Kingdom ==
- A636 road

== United States ==
- KY 636
- LA 636
  - LA 636-1
  - LA 636-2
  - LA 636-3
- PR-636
- FM 636
- SR 636

Preceded by 635	Lists of highways 636	Succeeded by 637
