= List of highways numbered 652 =

The following highways are numbered 652:

== United States ==
- LA 652
- MD 652
- PA 652
- PR-652

Preceded by 651	Lists of highways 652	Succeeded by 653
