= List of highways numbered 910 =

The following highways are numbered 910:

== Costa Rica ==
- National Route 910

== Cuba ==
- Road to Catalina de Güines (2–910)

== United States ==
- I-910 (unsigned)
- LA 910
- MD 910
- PA 910
- PR-910
- FM 910

Preceded by 909	Lists of highways 910	Succeeded by 911
