= List of highways numbered 990 =

The following highways are numbered 990:

== United States ==
- I-990
- SR 990
- LA 990
- PR-990

Preceded by 989	Lists of highways 990	Succeeded by 991
