= List of highways numbered 827 =

Highway 827, Route 827, or State Road 827, may refer to routes in the United States:

== Canada ==
- Highway 827 in Alberta

== United States ==
- SR 827 in Florida
- SR 827 in Indiana
- MD 827 in Maryland
- SR 827 in Nevada
- PR-827 in Puerto Rico

Preceded by 826	Lists of highways 827	Succeeded by 828
