= List of highways numbered 822 =

The following highways are numbered 822:

== United States ==
- Florida State Road 822
- County Road 822 (Broward County, Florida)
- Georgia State Route 822 (former)
- Louisiana Highway 822
- Maryland Route 822 (former)
- Maryland Route 822
- Nevada State Route 822
- Ohio State Route 822
- Puerto Rico Highway 822 (unbuilt)
- Virginia State Route 822 (1928-1933) (former)

Preceded by 821	Lists of highways 822	Succeeded by 823
