= List of highways numbered 623 =

The following highways are numbered 623:

== Costa Rica ==
- National Route 623

== United States ==
- MD 623
- PR-623
- SR 623

Preceded by 622	Lists of highways 623	Succeeded by 624
