= List of highways numbered 852 =

The following highways are numbered 852:

== United States ==
- SR 852
- LA 852
- MD 852
- SR 852
- PR-852
- FM 852

Preceded by 851	Lists of highways 852	Succeeded by 853
