= List of highways numbered 951 =

The following highways are numbered 951:

== Canada ==
- Highway 951

== United States ==
- SR 951
- LA 951 (former)
- MD 951
- PA 951 (former)
- PR-951
- FM 951

Preceded by 950	Lists of highways 951	Succeeded by 952
