= List of highways numbered 914 =

The following highways are numbered 914:

== Canada ==
- Highway 914

== Costa Rica ==
- National Route 914

== United States ==
- LA 914
- PA 914
- PR-914
- SC 914
- FM 914

| Preceded by 913 | Lists of highways 914 | Succeeded by 915 |
