= List of highways numbered 633 =

The following highways are numbered 633:

== Canada ==
- Alberta Highway 633
- Saskatchewan Highway 633

== Ireland ==
- R633 road (Ireland)

== United States ==
- LA 633
- SR 633
- PA 633
- PR-633
- FM 633
- SR 633

Preceded by 632	Lists of highways 633	Succeeded by 634
