= List of highways numbered 789 =

The following highways are numbered 789:

== Canada ==
- Alberta Highway 789 (former)
- Saskatchewan Highway 789

== United States ==
- U.S. Route 789 (former proposal)
- Arizona State Route 789 (former)
- Colorado State Highway 789 (former)
- Florida State Road 789
  - County Road 789 (Manatee County, Florida)
  - County Road 789 (Sarasota County, Florida)
    - County Road 789A (Sarasota County, Florida)
- Georgia State Route 789 (former proposal)
- Louisiana Highway 789
- Mississippi Highway 789
- Montana Highway 789 (former)
- Nevada State Route 789
- New Mexico State Road 789 (former)
- Farm to Market Road 789
- Virginia State Route 789
- Wyoming Highway 789

Preceded by 788	Lists of highways 789	Succeeded by 790
