= List of highways numbered 994 =

The following highways are numbered 994:

== United States ==
- SR 994
- LA 994
- PA 994
- PR-994
- FM 994

== Canada ==
- Saskatchewan Highway 994

Preceded by 993	Lists of highways 994	Succeeded by 995
