= List of highways numbered 622 =

The following highways are numbered 622:

== Canada ==
- Highway 622
- Highway 622

== Costa Rica ==
- National Route 622

== United States ==
- US 622 (former)
- PR-622
- SR 622
- WV 622

Preceded by 621	Lists of highways 622	Succeeded by 623
