= List of highways numbered 865 =

The following highways are numbered 865:

== Canada ==
- Route 865

== United States ==
- I-865
- SR 865
- LA 865
- PA 865
- PR-865
- FM 865

Preceded by 864	Lists of highways 865	Succeeded by 866
