= List of highways numbered 814 =

The following highways are numbered 814:

== Costa Rica ==
- National Route 814

== United States ==
- SR 814
  - County Road 814 (Broward County, Florida)
- LA 814 (former)
- MD 814 (former)
- SR 814
- PR-814
- FM 814

| Preceded by 813 | Lists of highways 814 | Succeeded by 815 |
