= List of highways numbered 643 =

The following highways are numbered 643:

== United States ==
- LA 643
- PA 643
- PR-643
- FM 643

Preceded by 642	Lists of highways 643	Succeeded by 644
