= List of highways numbered 654 =

The following highways are numbered 654:

== United States ==
- LA 654
- PA 654
- PR-654
- FM 654

Preceded by 653	Lists of highways 654	Succeeded by 655
