= List of highways numbered 693 =

The following highways are numbered 693:

== United States ==
Florida

- Florida State Road 693

Kentucky

- KY 693

Territories

- Puerto Rico Highway 693

Preceded by 692	Lists of highways 693	Succeeded by 694
