= List of highways numbered 688 =

The following highways are numbered 688:

== Canada ==
- Highway 688, Alberta
- Highway 688, Saskatchewan

== China ==
- China National Highway 688 (Chinese: 688国道, romanized: G688), Xinjiang

== United States ==
- SR 688, Florida
- LA 688, Louisiana
- MD 688 (former), Maryland
- County Route 688 (Burlington County, New Jersey)
- County Route 688 (Camden County, New Jersey)
- County Route 688 (Hudson County, New Jersey)
- County Route 688 (Middlesex County, New Jersey)
- County Route 688 (Passaic County, New Jersey)
- PR-688, Puerto Rico
- FM 688, Texas

== See also ==
- National Cycle Route 688, Yorkshire, England, United Kingdom

Preceded by 687	Lists of highways 688	Succeeded by 689
