= List of highways numbered 934 =

The following highways are numbered 934:

== Costa Rica ==
- National Route 934

== Ireland ==
- R934 regional road

== United States ==
- SR 934
- Iowa 934
- LA 934
- PA 934
- PR-934
- FM 934

Preceded by 933	Lists of highways 934	Succeeded by 935
