= List of highways numbered 473 =

The following highways are numbered 473:

== Australia ==
- Ventnor Road

== Japan ==
- Japan National Route 473

== United States ==
- Arizona State Route 473
- Louisiana Highway 473
- New Mexico State Road 473
- Puerto Rico Highway 473
- Texas:
  - Texas State Highway Spur 473
  - Ranch to Market Road 473

| Preceded by 472 | Lists of highways 473 | Succeeded by 474 |
