= List of highways numbered 897 =

The following highways are numbered 897:

== United States ==
- LA 897
  - LA 897-1
  - LA 897-2
  - LA 897-3
  - LA 897-4
  - LA 897-5
  - LA 897-6
- PA 897
- FM 897

Preceded by 896	Lists of highways 897	Succeeded by 898
