= List of highways numbered 523 =

The following highways are numbered 523:

== Canada ==
- Highway 523

== United Kingdom ==
- A523 road

== United States ==
- LA 523
- MD 523 (former)
- PA 523
- PR-523
- FM 523
- SR 523

Preceded by 522	Lists of highways 523	Succeeded by 524
