= List of highways numbered 992 =

The following highways are numbered 992:

== United States ==
- SR 992
- LA 992
- MD 992
- PA 992 (former)
- PR-992
- FM 992

Preceded by 991	Lists of highways 992	Succeeded by 993
