= List of highways numbered 926 =

The following highways are/were numbered 926:

== Costa Rica ==
- National Route 926

== United States ==
- Iowa 926
- LA 926 (former)
- PA 926
- PR-926
- FM 926

Preceded by 925	Lists of highways 926	Succeeded by 927
