= List of highways numbered 755 =

The following highways are numbered 755:

== Costa Rica ==
- National Route 755

== United States ==
- Interstate 755 (Mississippi) (proposed)
  - Interstate 755 (Missouri) (former proposal)
- Louisiana Highway 755
- Maryland Route 755
- Missouri Route 755
- County Route 755 (Camden County, New Jersey)
- Farm to Market Road 755
- Virginia State Route 755

Territories

- Puerto Rico Highway 755

Preceded by 754	Lists of highways 755	Succeeded by 756
