= Florida State Road 692 =

State highway in Florida, United States

State Road 692

Route information
- Maintained by FDOT
- Length: .61 mi (980 m)
- Existed: 2002–2013

Major junctions
- West end: CR 296 in Pinellas Park
- East end: I-275 / SR 93 in St. Petersburg

Location
- Country: United States
- State: Florida

Highway system
- Florida State Highway System; Interstate; US; State; Former; Pre‑1945; Toll; Scenic

State Road 692 (SR 692) was the number for a short freeway connector north of St. Petersburg, opened in 2002 to connect CR 296 (118th Avenue North) to SR 93 (Interstate 275). The road is now inventoried as part of State Road 686, being decommissioned in 2013.

== Route description ==
SR 692 started at 118th Avenue North, with the road running east as a freeway towards Interstate 275, ending at I-275's interchange with State Road 686, although SR 692 provided no access to SR 686.

Eastbound, it was signed for I-275, and westbound, it was signed for 118th Avenue North.

== History ==
SR 692 opened in 2002. This is the first instance of a Florida State Road with this number. When it opened, SR 692 was unsigned. Initially, there was no ramp from I-275 northbound to SR 692, but the ramp was built at a later date.

The road was decommissioned in 2013, and transferred to State Road 686.

== Major junctions ==
The entire route was in Pinellas County.

Location	mi	km	Destinations	Notes
Pinellas Park	0.00	0.00	CR 296 (118th Avenue)	Western terminus
St. Petersburg	0.61	0.98	I-275 / SR 93	Eastern terminus
1.000 mi = 1.609 km; 1.000 km = 0.621 mi
