= List of highways numbered 691 =

The following highways are numbered 691:

== United States ==
- I-691
- PR-691
- FM 691

Preceded by 690	Lists of highways 691	Succeeded by 692
