= List of highways numbered 537 =

The following highways are numbered 537:

== Canada ==
- Alberta Highway 537
- Ontario Highway 537

== United Kingdom ==
- A537 road

== United States ==
- MD 537
- CR 537
- SR 537
- PR-537
- Texas State Highway Spur 537

Preceded by 536	Lists of highways 537	Succeeded by 538
