= List of highways numbered 783 =

The following highways are numbered 783:

== United States ==
- LA 783
- MD 783
- PR-783

Preceded by 782	Lists of highways 783	Succeeded by 784
