= List of highways numbered 794 =

The following highways are numbered 794:

== Canada ==
- Alberta Highway 794 (former)
- Saskatchewan Highway 794

== United States ==
- I-794
- SR 794
- SR 794
- SR 794
- PR-794
- WIS 794

Preceded by 793	Lists of highways 794	Succeeded by 795
