= List of highways numbered 793 =

The following highways are numbered 793:

== United States ==
- LA 793
- PR-793
- FM 793

| Preceded by 792 | Lists of highways 793 | Succeeded by 794 |
