= List of highways numbered 18C =

The following highways are numbered 18C:

== United States ==
- Nebraska Spur 18C
- New York State Route 18C (former)
  - County Route 18C (Otsego County, New York)

== See also ==
- List of highways numbered 18
