= List of highways numbered 736 =

The following highways are numbered 736:

== Ireland ==
R736 regional road

== United States ==
- SR 736
- MD 736
- SR 736
- PA 736
- FM 736
- SR 736

| Preceded by 735 | Lists of highways 736 | Succeeded by 737 |
