= Maryland Route 983 =

Highway in Maryland

Maryland Route 983

Route information
- Maintained by MDSHA
- Existed: 1963–2017

MD 983
- Length: 1.02 mi (1.64 km)
- South end: Dead end in North Laurel
- North end: Old Scaggsville Road in North Laurel

MD 983A
- Length: 0.71 mi (1,140 m)
- South end: Dead end in Scaggsville
- North end: Leishear Road / Old Scaggsville Road in Scaggsville

Location
- Country: United States
- State: Maryland
- Counties: Howard

Highway system
- Maryland highway system; Interstate; US; State; Scenic Byways
← MD 982	→ MD 984

Maryland Route 983 (MD 983) was the unsigned designation for a pair of state highways in the U.S. state of Maryland. The highways formed parts of the old alignment of MD 216 on either side of Interstate 95 (I-95) in North Laurel in southeastern Howard County. MD 983 had a length of 1.02 miles (1.64 km) and ran on the east side of I-95. MD 983A spanned 0.71 miles (1.14 km) on the west side of I-95. MD 216 through North Laurel was built in the early 1920s. The segments of MD 983 were designated when MD 216 was relocated east of I-95 in the early 1960s and west of I-95 in the late 1970s. In 2017, both MD 983 and MD 983A were removed from the state highway system and transferred to county maintenance.

== Route description ==
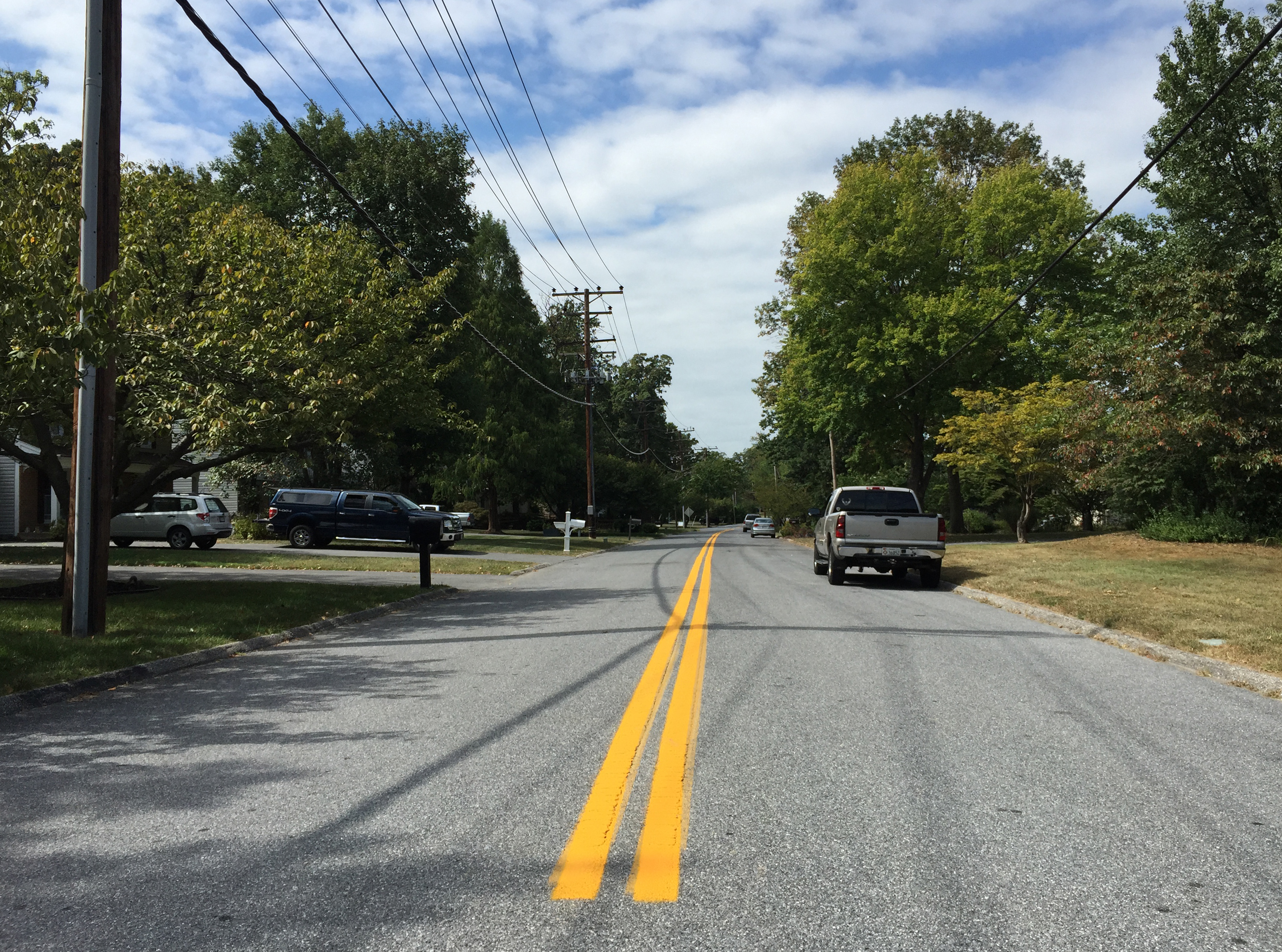
View north along MD 983A in Scaggsville in 2016, a short time before it was transferred to county maintenance

MD 983 began at a dead end at the Patuxent River in North Laurel; the dead end is on the opposite side of the river from the northern end of Ninth Street in the city of Laurel. The highway headed northwest as two-lane Old Scaggsville Road, which has intersections with Pilgrim Avenue and All Saints Road, which provide access to MD 216. MD 983 veered north ahead of its intersection with Stansfield Road, which passes under I-95 and indirectly connected with MD 983A. The state highway ended at the state–county maintenance boundary southeast of and adjacent to the MD 216–I-95 cloverleaf interchange. Old Scaggsville Road continues as a county street that curves east before ending in a residential community. MD 983A began at a cul-de-sac on the west side of the MD 216–I-95 interchange. The highway headed west as two-lane Scaggsville Road. MD 983A reached its western terminus at Leishear Road; the road continues west as Old Scaggsville Road, which was designated MD 216E.

== History ==
The two segments of MD 983 were part of the old alignment of MD 216, which crossed the Patuxent River on a bridge at Ninth Street in Laurel. The highway was constructed as a gravel road from Laurel to Scaggsville in 1923; that road was paved in 1956. MD 216's present bridge across the river at Seventh Street was built in 1960. The highway was relocated to its present alignment from Main Street in Laurel to the site of the I-95 interchange in 1963, leaving behind much of what is now MD 983. The interchange was built in 1970 and 1971. MD 216 was moved to its present alignment from the interchange west to Leishear Road between then and 1978, leaving behind MD 983A. The Patuxent River crossing at Ninth Street was removed, resulting in MD 983's present dead end at the river, in 1985. MD 983A connected directly with MD 216 at the Leishear Road intersection until MD 216 was relocated to its present course between Leishear Road and U.S. Route 29 in 2005. On February 2, 2017, MD 983 and MD 983A were removed from the state highway system and transferred to county maintenance.

== Junction list ==
The entire route was in Howard County.

Location	mi	km	Destinations	Notes
North Laurel	0.00	0.00	Dead end at Patuxent River	Southern terminus of MD 983
North Laurel	1.02	1.64	Old Scaggsville Road north	Northern terminus of MD 983; end of state maintenance
Gap between routes at I-95
Scaggsville	0.00	0.00	Cul-de-sac	Southern terminus of MD 983A
Scaggsville	0.71	1.14	Leishear Road north / Old Scaggsville Road west	Northern terminus of MD 983A; Old Scaggsville Road was MD 216E
1.000 mi = 1.609 km; 1.000 km = 0.621 mi
