= List of highways numbered 657 =

The following highways are numbered 657:

== Canada ==
- Highway 657
- Highway 657

== United States ==
- Arkansas Highway 657
- Louisiana Highway 657
- Maryland Route 657
- Nevada State Route 657
- Puerto Rico Highway 657
- Farm to Market Road 657
- Virginia State Route 657

Preceded by 656	Lists of highways 657	Succeeded by 658
