= List of highways numbered 925 =

The following highways have been numbered 925:

== Costa Rica ==
- National Route 925

== United States ==
- SR 925
- LA 925 (former)
- MD 925
- PA 925
- PR-925
- FM 925

Preceded by 924	Lists of highways 925	Succeeded by 926
