= List of highways numbered 472 =

The following highways are numbered 472:

== Canada ==
- Manitoba Provincial Road 472

== Japan ==
- Japan National Route 472

== United States ==
- Florida State Road 472
- Kentucky Route 472
- Louisiana Highway 472
- Maryland Route 472
- New Mexico State Road 472
- Pennsylvania Route 472
- Puerto Rico Highway 472
- Farm to Market Road 472

Preceded by 471	Lists of highways 472	Succeeded by 473
