= List of highways numbered 842 =

The following highways are numbered 842:

== United States ==
- SR 842
- KY 842
- LA 842 (former)
- PA 842
- PR-842
- FM 842

| Preceded by 841 | Lists of highways 842 | Succeeded by 843 |
