= List of highways numbered 824 =

Route 824 or Highway 824 can refer to:

== Canada ==
- Alberta Highway 824

== United States ==
- SR 824
- LA 824
  - LA 824-1
  - LA 824-2
  - LA 824-3
- MD 824
- SR 824
- SR 824 (former)
- PR-824
- SH 824

Preceded by 823	Lists of highways 824	Succeeded by 825
