= List of highways numbered 641 =

The following highways are numbered 641:

== Canada ==
- Highway 641

== United States ==
- US 641
- LA 641
- MD 641 (former)
- PA 641
- PR-641
- SC 641
- FM 641

Preceded by 640	Lists of highways 641	Succeeded by 642
