= List of highways numbered 879 =

The following highways are numbered 879:

== United States ==
- LA 879
- MD 879
- PA 879
- PR-879
- FM 879

Preceded by 878	Lists of highways 879	Succeeded by 880
