= List of highways numbered 937 =

The following highways are numbered 937:

== Costa Rica ==
- National Route 937

== Ireland ==
- R937 regional road

== United States ==
- LA 937
- MD 937
- PR-937
- FM 937

Preceded by 936	Lists of highways 937	Succeeded by 938
