= List of highways numbered 584 =

The following highways are numbered 584:

== International ==
- European route E584

== United Kingdom ==
- A584 road

== United States ==
- SR 584
- LA 584
- MD 584
- MS 584
- PR-584

Preceded by 583	Lists of highways 584	Succeeded by 585
