= List of highways numbered 773 =

The following highways are numbered 773:

== United States ==
- SR 773 (former)
- LA 773
- MS 773
- SR 773
- PR-773
- SC 773
- FM 773

Preceded by 772	Lists of highways 773	Succeeded by 774
