= List of highways numbered 885 =

The following highways are numbered 885:

== United States ==
- Interstate 885
- Arkansas Highway 885
- County Road 885 (Lee County, Florida)
- Louisiana Highway 885 (former)
- North Carolina Highway 885
- Pennsylvania Route 885
- Farm to Market Road 885

Preceded by 884	Lists of highways 885	Succeeded by 886
