= List of highways numbered 785 =

The following highways are numbered 785:

== United States ==
- Interstate 785
- Maryland Route 785
- Ohio State Route 785
- Puerto Rico Highway 785
- Virginia State Route 785

Preceded by 784	Lists of highways 785	Succeeded by 786
