= List of highways numbered 958 =

The following highways are numbered 958:

== United States ==
- LA 958
- MD 958
- PA 958
- PR-958
- FM 958

Preceded by 957	Lists of highways 958	Succeeded by 959
