= New York State Route 3E =

New York State Route 3E may refer to:

- New York State Route 3E (1930–1932) in Wayne, Cayuga, and western Oswego Counties
- New York State Route 3E (1932–1935) in central Oswego County
