= List of highways numbered 960 =

The following highways are numbered 960:

== United States ==
- SR 960
- LA 960
- PR-960
- FM 960

Preceded by 959	Lists of highways 960	Succeeded by 961
