= List of highways numbered 687 =

The following highways are numbered 687:

== United States ==
- I-687 (former proposal)
- SR 687
- MD 687 (former)
- PR-687

Preceded by 686	Lists of highways 687	Succeeded by 688
