= List of highways numbered 874 =

The following highways are numbered 874:

== United States ==
- AR 874
- SR 874
- LA 874
- MD 874
- PR-874
- FM 874

Preceded by 873	Lists of highways 874	Succeeded by 875
