= List of highways numbered 834 =

The following highways are numbered 834:

== Canada ==
- Alberta Highway 834

== Ireland ==
- R834 regional road

== United States ==
- SR 834
- LA 834
- MD 834
- PR-834
- FM 834

Preceded by 833	Lists of highways 834	Succeeded by 835
