= List of highways numbered 644 =

The following highways are numbered 644:

== United States ==
- LA 644
- MD 644
- SR 644
- PR-644
- FM 644

Preceded by 643	Lists of highways 644	Succeeded by 645
