= List of highways numbered 715 =

The following highways are numbered 715:

== Costa Rica ==
- National Route 715

== United States ==
Florida

- Florida State Road 715
- Pennsylvania Route 715

Territories

- Puerto Rico Highway 715

Preceded by 714	Lists of highways 715	Succeeded by 716
