= List of highways numbered 653 =

The following highways are numbered 653:

== United States ==
- Nevada State Route 653, an east–west state highway in Washoe County, Nevada, serving the city of Reno
- Pennsylvania Route 653, a 26-mile-long (42 km) state highway in Fayette and Somerset counties in Pennsylvania, United States
- Puerto Rico Highway 653, an east–west highway in Arecibo and Hatillo municipalities in Puerto Rico
- Virginia State Route 653, a secondary route in Virginia

Preceded by 652	Lists of highways 653	Succeeded by 654
