= List of highways numbered 669 =

The following highways are numbered 669:

== United States ==
- MD 669
- PA 669
- PR-669
- FM 669

Preceded by 668	Lists of highways 669	Succeeded by 670
