= List of highways numbered 831 =

The following highways are numbered 831:

== Germany ==
- Bundesautobahn 831

== United States ==
- AR 831
- LA 831 (former)
- MD 831
- PR-831
- SC 831 (former)
- FM 831

Preceded by 830	Lists of highways 831	Succeeded by 832
