= List of highways numbered 678 =

The following highways are numbered 678:

== Canada ==
- Highway 678

== United States ==
- I-678
- SR 678
- LA 678
- MD 678 (former)
- SR 678
- PR-678
- FM 678
- SR 678

Preceded by 677	Lists of highways 678	Succeeded by 679
