= List of highways numbered 846 =

The following highways are numbered 846:

== United States ==
- SR 846 (former)
  - County Road 846 (Collier County, Florida)
- LA 846
- MD 846
- PA 846
- PR-846
- FM 846

Preceded by 845	Lists of highways 846	Succeeded by 847
