= List of highways numbered 792 =

The following highways are numbered 792:

== United States ==
- LA 792
- PR-792
- FM 792

Preceded by 791	Lists of highways 792	Succeeded by 793
