= List of highways numbered 679 =

The following highways are numbered 679:

== Canada ==
- Highway 679

== United States ==
- SR 679
- LA 679
- PR-679
- FM 679

Preceded by 678	Lists of highways 679	Succeeded by 680
