= List of highways numbered 952 =

The following highways are numbered 952:

== United States ==
- LA 952
- MD 952
- PR-952
- FM 952

Preceded by 951	Lists of highways 952	Succeeded by 953
