= List of highways numbered 694 =

The following highways are numbered 694:

== United States ==
- I-694
- SR 694
- SR 694
- LA 694
- MD 694
- NC 694
- PR-694
- FM 694

Preceded by 693	Lists of highways 694	Succeeded by 695
