= List of highways numbered 929 =

The following highways are/were numbered 929:

== Costa Rica ==
- National Route 929

== United States ==
- SR 929
- LA 929 (former)
- MD 929
- PA 929
- PR-929
- FM 929

Preceded by 928	Lists of highways 929	Succeeded by 930
