= List of highways numbered 649 =

Route 649, or Highway 649, may refer to:

== Canada ==
- Alberta Highway 649
- Ontario Highway 649 (Kawartha Lakes Road 49)
- Saskatchewan Highway 649

== United States ==
- LA 649
- PR-649
- FM 649

Preceded by 648	Lists of highways 649	Succeeded by 650
