= List of highways numbered 912 =

The following highways are numbered 912:

== Costa Rica ==
- National Route 912

== United States ==
- SR 912
- LA 912 (former)
- MD 912 (former)
- PR-912
- FM 912

Preceded by 911	Lists of highways 912	Succeeded by 913
