= List of highways numbered 955 =

The following highways are numbered 955:

== Canada ==
- Highway 955

== United States ==
- SR 955 (former)
- LA 955
- PA 955
- PR-955
- FM 955

Preceded by 954	Lists of highways 955	Succeeded by 956
