= List of highways numbered 918 =

Route 918, or Highway 918, may refer to:

== Canada ==
- Saskatchewan Highway 918

== Costa Rica ==
- National Route 918

== Israel ==
- Israel Route 918

== United Kingdom ==
- A918 road

== United States ==
- KY 918
- MD 918
- PA 918
- PR-918

Preceded by 917	Lists of highways 918	Succeeded by 919
