= List of highways numbered 956 =

The following highways are numbered 956:

== United States ==
- SR 956
- LA 956
- MD 956
- PA 956
- PR-956
- FM 956
- WV 956

== Canada ==
- Saskatchewan Highway 956

Preceded by 955	Lists of highways 956	Succeeded by 957
