= List of highways numbered 966 =

The following highways are numbered 966:

== India ==
- National Highway 966 (India)

== United States ==
- LA 966
- PA 966 (former)
- PR-966
- FM 966

| Preceded by 965 | Lists of highways 966 | Succeeded by 967 |
