= List of highways numbered 738 =

The following highways are numbered 738:

== Costa Rica ==
- National Route 738

== Ireland ==
- R738 regional road

== United States ==
- PR-738
- FM 738

== Canada ==
- Saskatchewan Highway 738

Preceded by 737	Lists of highways 738	Succeeded by 739
