= List of highways numbered 942 =

The following highways are/were numbered 942:

== Canada ==
- Highway 942

== United States ==
- SR 942 (former)
- LA 942
- MD 942
- PR-942
- FM 942

Preceded by 941	Lists of highways 942	Succeeded by 943
