= List of highways numbered 497 =

The following highways are numbered 497:

== Ireland ==
- R497 road

== Japan ==
- Japan National Route 497

== United States ==
- Louisiana Highway 497
- Kentucky Route 497
- Maryland Route 497
- Farm to Market Road 497 (former)

Preceded by 496	Lists of highways 497	Succeeded by 498
