= List of highways numbered 595 =

The following highways are numbered 595:

== United States ==
- I-595
  - Interstate 595 (Florida), a spur from I-75 across I-95 to Fort Lauderdale, Florida
  - Interstate 595 (Maryland), an unsigned spur to Annapolis, Maryland
  - Interstate 595 (Virginia), a never-built upgrade for US 1 in Arlington, Virginia
- SR 595
- LA 595
- PR-595
- FM 595

| Preceded by 594 | Lists of highways 595 | Succeeded by 596 |
