= List of highways numbered 832 =

The following highways are numbered 832:

== United States ==
- SR 832 (former)
  - CR 832
- LA 832 (former)
- MD 832
- PA 832
- PR-832
- FM 832

Preceded by 831	Lists of highways 832	Succeeded by 833
