= List of highways numbered 900 =

The following highways are numbered 900:

== Cuba ==
- Old Road to Catalina de Güines (2–900)

== United States ==
- LA 900
- PR-900
- FM 900
- SR 900

| Preceded by 899 | Lists of highways 900 | Succeeded by 901 |
