= List of highways numbered 944 =

The following highways are numbered 944:

== United States ==
- SR 944
- LA 944
- MD 944
- PA 944
- PR-944
- FM 944

Preceded by 943	Lists of highways 944	Succeeded by 945
