= List of highways numbered 938 =

The following highways are numbered 938:

== Ireland ==
- R938 regional road

== Costa Rica ==
- National Route 938

== United States ==
- LA 938
- PR-938
- FM 938

Preceded by 937	Lists of highways 938	Succeeded by 939
