= List of highways numbered 642 =

The following highways are numbered 642:

== Greece ==
- A642 motorway (old number, now the A621)

== United States ==
- AR 642
- LA 642
- MD 642
- PA 642
- PR-642
- FM 642

| Preceded by 641 | Lists of highways 642 | Succeeded by 643 |
