= List of highways numbered 424 =

The following highways are numbered 424:

== Canada ==
- Manitoba Provincial Road 424

== Japan ==
- Japan National Route 424

== United States ==
- Louisiana Highway 424
- Maryland Route 424
- New York State Route 424 (former)
- Ohio State Route 424 (former)
- Pennsylvania Route 424
- Puerto Rico Highway 424
- Farm to Market Road 424

Preceded by 423	Lists of highways 424	Succeeded by 425
