= List of highways numbered 720 =

The following is a list of roads numbered 720:

== Canada ==
- Saskatchewan Highway 720

== Costa Rica ==
- National Route 720

== Cuba ==
- Melena–Batabano Road (2–720)

== India ==
- National Highway 720

== United Kingdom ==
- A720 road

== United States ==
- Kentucky Route 720
- Louisiana Highway 720
- Nevada State Route 720
- Ohio State Route 720
- Puerto Rico Highway 720
- Virginia State Route 720

Preceded by 719	Lists of highways 720	Succeeded by 721
