= List of highways numbered 761 =

The following highways are numbered 761:

== Canada ==
- Highway 761

== Costa Rica ==
- National Route 761

== United States ==
- LA 761
- MD 761
- PR-761
- FM 761

Preceded by 760	Lists of highways 761	Succeeded by 762
