= List of highways numbered 591 =

The following highways are numbered 591:

== United Kingdom ==
- A591 road

== United States ==
Territories

- Puerto Rico Highway 591

Former

- Ohio State Route 591 (1937–1955)

Preceded by 590	Lists of highways 591	Succeeded by 592
