= List of highways numbered 621 =

The following highways are numbered 621:

== Costa Rica ==
- National Route 621

== Greece ==
- A621 motorway (formerly numbered the A642)

== United Kingdom ==
- A621
- M621

== United States ==
- SR 621
- PR-621
- SR 621

Preceded by 620	Lists of highways 621	Succeeded by 622
