= List of highways numbered 917 =

The following highways are numbered 917:

== Canada ==
- Saskatchewan Highway 917

== Costa Rica ==
- National Route 917

== United States ==
- AR 917
- PA 917
- PR-917
- SC 917

Preceded by 916	Lists of highways 917	Succeeded by 918
