= List of highways numbered 690 =

The following highways are numbered 690:

== Canada ==
- Alberta Highway 690
- New Brunswick Route 690
- Saskatchewan Highway 690

== United States ==
- I-690
- SR 690
- NY 690
- SR 690
- PA 690
- PR-690
- SR 690 (a placeholder designation for Interstate 69)

Preceded by 689	Lists of highways 690	Succeeded by 691
