= List of highways numbered 830 =

The following highways are numbered 830:

== Hungary ==
- Main road 830 (Hungary)

== United States ==
- US 830 (former)
- LA 830
  - LA 830-1
  - LA 830-2
  - LA 830-3
  - LA 830-4
  - LA 830-5
  - LA 830-6
- MD 830
- PA 830
- PR-830
- FM 830

Preceded by 829	Lists of highways 830	Succeeded by 831
