= List of highways numbered 871 =

The following highways are numbered 871:

== United States ==
- AR 871
- LA 871
- MD 871
- PR-871
- FM 871

Preceded by 870	Lists of highways 871	Succeeded by 872
