= List of highways numbered 936 =

The following highways are/were numbered 936:

== Costa Rica ==
- National Route 936

== Ireland ==
- R936 regional road

== United States ==
- SR 936 (former)
- LA 936
- MD 936
- PR-936
- FM 936

Preceded by 935	Lists of highways 936	Succeeded by 937
