= List of highways numbered 753 =

The following highways are numbered 753:

== Canada ==
- Saskatchewan Highway 753

== Costa Rica ==
- National Route 753

== United States ==
- LA 753 (former)
- SR 753 (Ohio)
- PR-753
- FM 753

Preceded by 752	Lists of highways 753	Succeeded by 754
