= List of highways numbered 754 =

The following highways are numbered 754:

== Australia ==
- Melton Highway

== Ireland ==
- R754 regional road

== United States ==
- Georgia State Route 754 (former)
- County Route 754 (Cumberland County, New Jersey)
- Ohio State Route 754
- Puerto Rico Highway 754

Preceded by 753	Lists of highways 754	Succeeded by 755
