= List of highways numbered 923 =

The following highways are numbered 923:

== Canada ==
- Highway 923

== Costa Rica ==
- National Route 923

== United States ==
- LA 923
- MS 923
- PA 923
- PR-923
- FM 923

Preceded by 922	Lists of highways 923	Succeeded by 924
