= List of highways numbered 656 =

The following highways are numbered 656:

== Canada ==
- Highway 656
- Highway 656

== United States ==
- SR 656
- LA 656 (former)
- MD 656
- PR-656
- FM 656

Preceded by 655	Lists of highways 656	Succeeded by 657
