= List of highways numbered 967 =

The following highways are numbered 967:

== United States ==
- LA 967
- MD 967
- PR-967

Preceded by 966	Lists of highways 967	Succeeded by 968
