= Interstate 635 =

Interstate 635 may refer to:

- Interstate 635 (Kansas–Missouri), a connector highway between Interstate 35 in Overland Park, Kansas and Interstate 29 in Kansas City, Missouri, signed as the Harry Darby Memorial Highway
- Interstate 635 (Texas), a partial loop around Dallas, Texas also signed as the LBJ Freeway
