= List of highways numbered 488 =

The following highways are numbered 488:

== Canada ==
- Manitoba Provincial Road 488

== Japan ==
- Japan National Route 488

== United States ==
- Maryland Route 488
- Mississippi Highway 488
- Nevada State Route 488
- New York State Route 488
- Pennsylvania Route 488
- Puerto Rico Highway 488

Preceded by 487	Lists of highways 488	Succeeded by 489
