= List of highways numbered 786 =

The following highways are numbered 786:

== Canada ==
- Highway 786

== United States ==
- SR 786
- LA 786
- FM 786
- SR 786

Preceded by 785	Lists of highways 786	Succeeded by 787
