= List of highways numbered 909 =

The following highways are numbered 909:

== Costa Rica ==
- National Route 909

== United States ==
- SR 909
- LA 909
- MD 909
- PA 909 (former)
- PR-909
- FM 909

Preceded by 908	Lists of highways 909	Succeeded by 910
