= List of highways numbered 489 =

A List of highways numbered 489:

== Japan ==
- Japan National Route 489, a route which connects Shunan to Yamaguchi

== United States ==
- Nevada State Route 489 (LA 981), a state highway that connected the near ghost town of Cherry Creek to U.S. Route 93 in White Pine County, Nevada
- Maryland Route 489, a state highway in the U.S. state of Maryland
- Secondary Highway 489, a road near the Yellowstone River, Montana
- Puerto Rico Highway 489, a highway in Hatillo municipality in Puerto Rico

Preceded by 488	Lists of highways 489	Succeeded by 490
