= List of highways numbered 836 =

Route 836, or Highway 836, may refer to:

== Canada ==
- Alberta Highway 836

== United Kingdom ==
- A836 road

== United States ==
- SR 836
- Route 836 (former)
- KY 836
- MD 836
- PA 836
- PR-836

Preceded by 835	Lists of highways 836	Succeeded by 837
