= List of highways numbered 995 =

The following highways are numbered 995:

== Canada ==
- Highway 995

== United States ==
- LA 995
- MD 995
- PA 995
- PR-995
- FM 995

Preceded by 994	Lists of highways 995	Succeeded by 996
