= List of highways numbered 640 =

The following highways are numbered 640:

== Canada ==
- New Brunswick Route 640
- Quebec Autoroute 640
- Saskatchewan Highway 640

== Ireland ==
- R640 road (Ireland)

== United Kingdom ==
- A640 road

== United States ==
- I-640
- KY 640
- LA 640
- MD 640
- SR 640
- FM 640
- SR 640

Preceded by 639	Lists of highways 640	Succeeded by 641
