= List of highways numbered 815 =

The following highways are numbered 815:

== Australia ==
- Foundation Road

== United States ==
- SR 815 (former)
- LA 815
- MD 815
- PR-815
- FM 815

Preceded by 814	Lists of highways 815	Succeeded by 816
