= List of highways numbered 788 =

The following highways are numbered 788:

== Canada ==
- Highway 788

== United States ==
- LA 788
- MD 788
- SR 788
- PR-788
- FM 788
- SR 788

Preceded by 787	Lists of highways 788	Succeeded by 789
