= List of highways numbered 839 =

The following highways are numbered 839:

== United States ==
- County Road 839 (Collier County, Florida)
- LA 839 (former)
- PA 839
- PR-839
- FM 839

Preceded by 838	Lists of highways 839	Succeeded by 840
