= List of highways numbered 996 =

The following highways are numbered 996:

== Australia ==
C996 - Thames Promenade

== United States ==
- LA 996
- MD 996 (former)
- PA 996 (former)
- PR-996
- FM 996

Preceded by 995	Lists of highways 996	Succeeded by 997
