= List of highways numbered 810 =

The following highways are numbered 810:

== Costa Rica ==
- National Route 810

== United States ==
- SR 810
  - County Road 810 (Lee County, Florida)
- LA 810
- MD 810
- PR-810
- FM 810

Preceded by 809	Lists of highways 810	Succeeded by 811
