= List of highways numbered 782 =

The following highways are numbered 782:

== United States ==
- SR 782 (former)
- LA 782
  - LA 782-1
  - LA 782-2
  - LA 782-3
- MS 782
- PR-782
- SC 782 (former)
- FM 782

Preceded by 781	Lists of highways 782	Succeeded by 783
