= List of highways numbered 980 =

The following highways are numbered 980:

== Philippines ==
- N980 highway (Philippines)

== United States ==
- I-980
- LA 980 (former)
- MD 980
- PA 980
- PR-980
- FM 980

Preceded by 979	Lists of highways 980	Succeeded by 981
