= List of highways numbered 668 =

The following highways are numbered 668:

== United States ==
- LA 668
- MD 668
- PR-668
- FM 668

Preceded by 667	Lists of highways 668	Succeeded by 669
