= List of highways numbered 933 =

The following highways are numbered 933:

== Costa Rica ==
- National Route 933

== Ireland ==
- R933 regional road

== United States ==
- AR 933
- SR 933
- SR 933
- LA 933
- PA 933
- PR-933
- FM 933

| Preceded by 932 | Lists of highways 933 | Succeeded by 934 |
