= List of highways numbered 751 =

The following highways are numbered 751:

== Canada ==
- Highway 751

== Costa Rica ==
- National Route 751

== United States ==
- LA 751
- MD 751
- NC 751
- SR 751
- PR-751
- FM 751

Preceded by 750	Lists of highways 751	Succeeded by 752
