= List of highways numbered 746 =

The following highways are numbered 746:

== Costa Rica ==
- National Route 746

== United States ==
- Georgia State Route 746 (former)
- Louisiana Highway 746
- Maryland Route 746
- Ohio State Route 746
- Puerto Rico Highway 746

Preceded by 745	Lists of highways 746	Succeeded by 747
