= List of highways numbered 950 =

The following highways are numbered 950:

== Canada ==
- Highway 950

== United States ==
- LA 950 (former)
- MD 950
- PA 950
- PR-950
- FM 950

Preceded by 949	Lists of highways 950	Succeeded by 951
