= List of highways numbered 953 =

Route 953, or Highway 953, may refer to:

== Canada ==
- Saskatchewan Highway 953

== India ==
- National Highway 953

== United Kingdom ==
- A953 road

== United States ==
- SR 953
- CR 953
- KY 953
- LA 953
- MD 953
- PA 953
- PR-953

Preceded by 952	Lists of highways 953	Succeeded by 954
