= List of highways numbered 855 =

The following highways are numbered 855:

== Canada ==
- Alberta Highway 855
- New Brunswick Route 855

== United States ==
- LA 855
- MD 855
- PA 855 (former)
- PR-855
- FM 855

Preceded by 854	Lists of highways 855	Succeeded by 856
