= List of highways numbered 845 =

The following highways are numbered 845:

== Canada ==
- Alberta Highway 845

== United States ==
- SR 845
- LA 845
- MD 845
- PA 845
- PR-845
- FM 845

| Preceded by 844 | Lists of highways 845 | Succeeded by 846 |
