= List of highways numbered 747 =

The following highways are numbered 747:

== Canada ==
- Alberta Highway 747
- Saskatchewan Highway 747

== Costa Rica ==
- National Route 747

== United States ==
- SR 747
- MD 747
- NY 747
- PA 747
- PR-747

Preceded by 746	Lists of highways 747	Succeeded by 748
