= List of highways numbered 948 =

The following highways are/were numbered 948:

== India ==
- NH 948

== United States ==
- SR 948
- LA 948
- MD 948
- PA 948
- PR-948
- FM 948 (former)

Preceded by 947	Lists of highways 948	Succeeded by 949
