= List of highways numbered 18E =

The following highways are numbered 18E:

== United States ==
- Nebraska Spur 18E
- New York State Route 18E (former)

== See also ==
- List of highways numbered 18
