= List of highways numbered 913 =

Route 913, or Highway 913, may refer to:

== Canada ==
- Saskatchewan Highway 913

== Costa Rica ==
- National Route 913

== India ==
- National Highway 913 (NH 913) is the notified number of the proposed Arunachal Frontier Highway in Arunachal Pradesh state, near the McMahon Line frontier with China.

== United Kingdom ==
- A913 road

== United States ==
- SR 913
- KY 913
- MD 913
- PA 913
- PR-913

| Preceded by 912 | Lists of highways 913 | Succeeded by 914 |
