= List of highways numbered 866 =

Route 866 may refer to:

== Canada ==
- Highway 866

== Israel ==
- Route 866 (Israel)

== United States ==
- PA 866
- FM 866

Territories

- Puerto Rico Highway 866

Preceded by 865	Lists of highways 866	Succeeded by 867
