= List of highways numbered 924 =

The following highways have been numbered 924:

== Canada ==
- Highway 924

== United States ==
- SR 924
- LA 924 (former)
- MD 924
- PA 924
- PR-924
- FM 924

Preceded by 923	Lists of highways 924	Succeeded by 925
