= List of highways numbered 876 =

The following highways are numbered 876:

== United States ==
- I-876 (former)
- AR 876
- SR 876
- KY 876
- LA 876
- PR-876
- FM 876

Preceded by 875	Lists of highways 876	Succeeded by 877
