= List of highways numbered 674 =

The following highways are numbered 674:

== Canada ==
- Alberta Highway 674
- Saskatchewan Highway 674

== England ==
- A674 Chorley to Blackburn

== Philippines ==
- N674 highway (Philippines)

== United States ==
- SR 674
- LA 674
- MD 674
- SR 674
- PR-674
- RM 674
- Virginia:
  - Virginia State Route 674 (Fairfax County)
  - Virginia State Route 674 (Prince William County)

Preceded by 673	Lists of highways 674	Succeeded by 675
