= List of highways numbered 825 =

Highway 825, Route 825, or State Road 825, may refer to:

== Canada ==
- Highway 825 in Alberta

== United States ==
- SR 825 in Florida
- SR 825 in Nevada
- NY 825 in New York
- PR-825 in Puerto Rico

Preceded by 824	Lists of highways 825	Succeeded by 826
