= List of highways numbered 559 =

The following highways are numbered 559:

== Ireland ==
- R559 regional road

== United States ==
- SR 559
- LA 559
- MD 559 (former)
- County Route 559 (New Jersey)
- SR 559
- PR-559
- FM 559

Preceded by 558	Lists of highways 559	Succeeded by 560
