= List of highways numbered 460 =

The following highways are numbered 460:

== Australia ==
- Strzelecki Highway

== Canada ==
- New Brunswick Route 460
- Newfoundland and Labrador Route 460

== Ireland ==
- R460 road (Ireland)

== Japan ==
- Japan National Route 460

== United States ==
- U.S. Route 460
- Louisiana Highway 460
- Maryland Route 460
- New Mexico State Road 460
- Puerto Rico Highway 460
- South Carolina Highway 460
- Tennessee State Route 460 (proposed)

| Preceded by 459 | Lists of highways 460 | Succeeded by 461 |
