= List of highways numbered 581 =

The following highways are numbered 581:

== United States ==
- I-581
- SR 581
- LA 581
- MD 581 (former)
- NC 581
- County Route 581 (New Jersey)
- PA 581
- PR-581
- FM 581

Preceded by 580	Lists of highways 581	Succeeded by 582
