= List of highways numbered 620 =

The following highways are numbered 620:

== Canada ==
- Highway 620

== Costa Rica ==
- National Route 620

== Germany ==
- Bundesautobahn 620

== United States ==
- PR-620
- RM 620
- SR 620

Preceded by 619	Lists of highways 620	Succeeded by 621
