= List of highways numbered 651 =

The following highways are numbered 651:

== Canada ==
- Alberta Highway 651
- Ontario Highway 651
- Saskatchewan Highway 651

== Israel ==
- Route 651 (Israel)

== United States ==
- SR 651
- SR 651 (former)
- SR 651
- PR-651
- Local Route 651, Lobbs Shop Road, Sussex County, Virginia

Preceded by 650	Lists of highways 651	Succeeded by 652
