= List of highways numbered 790 =

The following highways are numbered 790:

== Canada ==
- New Brunswick Route 790
- Saskatchewan Highway 790

== Cuba ==
- La Ruda–Cotilla Road (2–790)

== United States ==
- I-790
- SR 790
- PA 790
- PR-790
- SR 790

Preceded by 789	Lists of highways 790	Succeeded by 791
