= List of highways numbered 729 =

The following highways are numbered 729:

== Costa Rica ==
- National Route 729

== United States ==
- SR 729
- LA 729
- PA 729
- PR-729
- FM 729

| Preceded by 728 | Lists of highways 729 | Succeeded by 730 |
