= List of highways numbered 730 =

The following highways are numbered 730:

== Costa Rica ==
- National Route 730

== United States ==
- I-730 (former proposal)
- US 730
- PR-730
- FM 730

Preceded by 729	Lists of highways 730	Succeeded by 731
