= List of highways numbered 981 =

A List of highways numbered 981:

== Canada ==
- Saskatchewan Highway 981, a provincial highway in the east central region of the Canadian province of Saskatchewan

== United States ==
- Louisiana Highway 981 (LA 981), a state highway in Louisiana that serves Pointe Coupee Parish
- Pennsylvania Route 981 (PA 981), a state highway which runs across Westmoreland County
- Puerto Rico Highway 981 (PR-981), a highway in Ceiba and Fajardo municipalities

Preceded by 980	Lists of highways 981	Succeeded by 982
