= List of highways numbered 853 =

The following highways are numbered 853:

== United States ==
- LA 853 (former)
- MD 853
- PA 853
- PR-853

Preceded by 852	Lists of highways 853	Succeeded by 854
