= List of highways numbered 921 =

The following highways have been numbered 921:

== Costa Rica ==
- National Route 921

== United States ==
- LA 921
- MD 921
- PA 921
- PR-921
- FM 921

Preceded by 920	Lists of highways 921	Succeeded by 922
