= List of highways numbered 939 =

The following highways are numbered 939:

== Costa Rica ==
- National Route 939

== United States ==
Florida

- Florida State Road 939

Territories

- Puerto Rico Highway 939

Preceded by 938	Lists of highways 939	Succeeded by 940
