= List of highways numbered 973 =

The following is a list of highways numbered 973:

== Canada ==
- A-973 in Quebec

== United States ==
- SR 973 in Florida
- KY 973 in Kentucky
- LA 973 in Louisiana
- MD 973 in Maryland
- PA 973 in Pennsylvania
- PR-973 in Puerto Rico
- FM 973 in Texas

Preceded by 972	Lists of highways 973	Succeeded by 974
