= List of highways numbered 672 =

The following highways are numbered 672:

== Philippines ==
- N672 highway (Philippines)

== United States ==
- MD 672
- PA 672 (former)
- PR-672
- FM 672

== Canada ==
- Highway 672
- Highway 672

Preceded by 671	Lists of highways 672	Succeeded by 673
