= List of highways numbered 659 =

The following highways are numbered 659:

== United States ==
- SR 659
- LA 659
- Nevada State Route 659
- PR-659
- FM 659

Preceded by 658	Lists of highways 659	Succeeded by 660
