= List of highways numbered 774 =

The following highways are numbered 774:

== United States ==
- LA 774
- PR-774
- FM 774

| Preceded by 773 | Lists of highways 774 | Succeeded by 775 |
