= List of highways numbered 765 =

The following highways are numbered 765:

== India ==
- National Highway 765 (India)

== United States ==
- SR 765 (former)
- LA 765
- MD 765
- Route 765
- PR-765
- FM 765

| Preceded by 764 | Lists of highways 765 | Succeeded by 766 |
