= List of highways numbered 670 =

The following highways are numbered 670:

== Philippines ==
- N670 highway (Philippines)

== United States ==
- I-670
  - Interstate 670 (Kansas–Missouri), a connector highway within Kansas City
  - Interstate 670 (Ohio), a spur highway connecting Columbus, Ohio, to Gahanna, Ohio
- LA 670
- MD 670
- PA 670
- PR-670
- FM 670

Preceded by 669	Lists of highways 670	Succeeded by 671
