= List of highways numbered 963 =

The following highways are numbered 963

== United States ==
- LA 963
- MD 963
- PA 963 (former)
- PR-963

Preceded by 962	Lists of highways 963	Succeeded by 964
