= List of highways numbered 869 =

The following highways are numbered 869:

== United States ==
- SR 869
- LA 869
- PA 869
- PR-869
- FM 869
- WV 869

Preceded by 868	Lists of highways 869	Succeeded by 870
