= List of highways numbered 796 =

The following highways are numbered 796:

== United States ==
- LA 796
- MD 796
- PA 796
- PR-796
- FM 796
- Milford Parkway/Daniel S. Wasson Connector (SR-796)

Preceded by 795	Lists of highways 796	Succeeded by 797
