= List of highways numbered 800 =

The following highways are numbered 800:

== Canada ==
- Alberta Highway 800
- Highway 800 (Ontario) (former)

== United States ==
- SR 800
- KY 800
- MD 800
- SR 800
- PR-800

Preceded by 799	Lists of highways 800	Succeeded by 801
