= List of highways numbered 750 =

The following highways are numbered 750:

== Costa Rica ==
- National Route 750

== Cuba ==
- San Antonio de las Vegas–Santa Amelia Road (2–750)

== United States ==
- SR 750
- LA 750 (former)
- MD 750
- PR-750
- FM 750

Preceded by 749	Lists of highways 750	Succeeded by 751
