= List of highways numbered 863 =

The following highways are numbered 863:

== United States ==
- SR 863 (former)
- LA 863
- MD 863
- PA 863
- PR-863
- FM 863 (former)

Preceded by 862	Lists of highways 863	Succeeded by 864
