= List of highways numbered 954 =

The following highways are numbered 954:

== Canada ==
- Saskatchewan Highway 954

== India ==
- National Highway 954 (India)

== United States ==
- SR 954
- LA 954
- MD 954
- PA 954
- PR-954
- FM 954

Preceded by 953	Lists of highways 954	Succeeded by 955
