= List of highways numbered 766 =

The following highways are numbered 766:

== United States ==
- U.S. Route 766 (former proposal)
- LA 766 (former)
- MS 766
- SR 766
- PA 766 (former)
- PR-766
- FM 766

Preceded by 765	Lists of highways 766	Succeeded by 767
