= List of highways numbered 482 =

The following highways are numbered 482:

== Canada ==
- Manitoba Provincial Road 482

== Cuba ==
- Santa Clara–Báez–Fomento Road (4–482)

== Japan ==
- Japan National Route 482

== United States ==
- Florida State Road 482
- Maryland Route 482
- Puerto Rico Highway 482

Preceded by 481	Lists of highways 482	Succeeded by 483
