= List of highways numbered 673 =

The following highways are numbered 673:

== Canada ==
- Saskatchewan Highway 673

== Philippines ==
- N673 highway (Philippines)

== United States ==
- LA 673
- MD 673
- SR 673
- PR-673
- FM 673

Preceded by 672	Lists of highways 673	Succeeded by 674
