= List of highways numbered 898 =

The following highways are numbered 898:

== United States ==
- LA 898
- FM 898

| Preceded by 897 | Lists of highways 898 | Succeeded by 899 |
