= Interstate 695 =

Interstate 695 is the designation for the following six Interstate Highways in the United States, all of which are related to I-95:

- Interstate 695 (District of Columbia), a partially built connector in Washington, D.C.
- Interstate 695 (Maryland), a partial beltway around Baltimore, Maryland
- Interstate 695 (New York), a short connector in Bronx County, New York
- Interstate 695 (Pennsylvania), a never-built connector in Philadelphia, Pennsylvania
- Interstate 695 (New Jersey), a never-built connector near Bound Brook, New Jersey
- Interstate 695 (Massachusetts), a mostly never-built connector in Boston, Massachusetts
