= List of highways numbered 856 =

The following highways are numbered 856:

== United States ==
- SR 856
- LA 856
- MD 856
- SR 856
- PA 856 (former)
- PR-856
- FM 856

Preceded by 855	Lists of highways 856	Succeeded by 857
