= List of highways numbered 728 =

The following highways are numbered 728:

== Canada ==
- Highway 728

== Costa Rica ==
- National Route 728

== United States ==
- LA 728
  - LA 728-1
  - LA 728-2
  - LA 728-3
  - LA 728-4
  - LA 728-5
  - LA 728-6
  - LA 728-7
  - LA 728-8
- SR 728
- PR-728
- FM 728

Preceded by 727	Lists of highways 728	Succeeded by 729
