= List of highways numbered 843 =

The following highways are numbered 843:

== United States ==
- LA 843
- MD 843
- PR-843
- FM 843

Preceded by 842	Lists of highways 843	Succeeded by 844
