= List of highways numbered 713 =

The following highways are numbered 713:

== Costa Rica ==
- National Route 713

== India ==
- National Highway 713 (India)

== United States ==
- Florida State Road 713
- Georgia State Route 713 (former)
- Maryland Route 713
- Mississippi Highway 713
- Puerto Rico Highway 713

| Preceded by 712 | Lists of highways 713 | Succeeded by 714 |
