= Uspenovka, Belogorsky District, Amur Oblast =

Uspenovka Успеновка
- Selo
- Location within Amur Oblast Location within Russia
- Coordinates: 50°59′N 127°57′E
- Country: Russia
- Region: Amur Oblast
- District: Belogorsky District
- Time zone: UTC+9:00

Uspenovka (Russian: Успеновка) is a rural locality (a selo) in Uspenovsky Selsoviet of Belogorsky District, Amur Oblast, Russia. The population was 319 as of 2018. There are 5 streets.

== Geography ==
Uspenovka is located on the right bank of the Belaya River, 49 km southeast of Belogorsk (the district's administrative centre) by road. Srednebeloye is the nearest rural locality.
