= List of highways numbered 661 =

The following highways are numbered 661:

== Germany ==
- Bundesautobahn 661

== Canada ==
- Highway 661

== United States ==
- LA 661
- MD 661 (former)
- SR 661
- PR-661
- FM 661
- SR 661

Preceded by 660	Lists of highways 661	Succeeded by 662
