= List of highways numbered 949 =

The following highways are/were numbered 949:

== United States ==
- LA 949 (former)
- MD 949
- PA 949
- PR-949
- FM 949

Preceded by 948	Lists of highways 949	Succeeded by 950
