= List of highways numbered 590 =

The following highways are numbered 590:

== Canada ==
- Alberta Highway 590
- New Brunswick Route 590
- Ontario Highway 590

== Ireland ==
- R590 regional road

== United Kingdom ==
- A590 road

== United States ==
- I-590
- SR 590
- NY 590
- SR 590
- PA 590
- PR-590

| Preceded by 589 | Lists of highways 590 | Succeeded by 591 |
