= List of highways numbered 848 =

The following highways are numbered 848:

== India ==
- National Highway 848 (India)

== United States ==
- SR 848
  - County Road 848 (Broward County, Florida)
- LA 848
- PA 848
- PR-848
- FM 848

Preceded by 847	Lists of highways 848	Succeeded by 849
