= List of highways numbered 988 =

The following highways are numbered 988:

== United States ==
- LA 988
- PR-988
- FM 988

Preceded by 987	Lists of highways 988	Succeeded by 989
