= List of highways numbered 821 =

The following highways are numbered 821:

== Canada ==
- Alberta Highway 821

== United Kingdom ==
- A821 road

== United States ==
- SR 821
- MD 821
- SR 821
- PR-821
- SR 821

| Preceded by 820 | Lists of highways 821 | Succeeded by 822 |
