= List of highways numbered 568 =

The following highways are numbered 568:

== Ireland ==
- R568 road (Ireland)

== United States ==
- Maryland Route 568
- Ohio State Route 568
- Pennsylvania Route 568
- Puerto Rico Highway 568

Preceded by 567	Lists of highways 568	Succeeded by 569
