= List of highways numbered 916 =

The following highways are numbered 916:

== Canada ==
- Saskatchewan Highway 916

== United States ==
- SR 916
- LA 916
- PR-916

Preceded by 915	Lists of highways 916	Succeeded by 917
