= List of highways numbered 742 =

The following highways are numbered 742:

== Costa Rica ==
- National Route 742

== United States ==
Florida

- Florida State Road 742

North Carolina

NC 742

Territories

- Puerto Rico Highway 742

Preceded by 741	Lists of highways 742	Succeeded by 743
