= List of highways numbered 870 =

The following highways are numbered 870:

== United States ==
- I-870 (former proposal)
- SR 870
- LA 870
- MD 870
- PR-870
- FM 870 (former)

Preceded by 869	Lists of highways 870	Succeeded by 871
