= List of highways numbered 862 =

The following highways are numbered 862:

== United States ==
- SR 862
- LA 862
- PA 862 (former)
- PR-862
- FM 862

== Germany ==
- Bundesautobahn 862

Preceded by 861	Lists of highways 862	Succeeded by 863
