= List of highways numbered 784 =

The following highways are numbered 784:

== Israel ==
- Route 784

== United States ==
- LA 784
- MD 784
- PR-784
- FM 784

| Preceded by 783 | Lists of highways 784 | Succeeded by 785 |
