= List of highways numbered 886 =

Route 886, or Highway 886, may refer to:

== Canada ==
- Alberta Highway 886

== Israel ==
- Israel Route 886

== United Kingdom ==
- A886 road

== United States ==
- SR 886
- KY 886
- MD 886
- PA 886 (former)
- PR-886

Preceded by 885	Lists of highways 886	Succeeded by 887
