= List of highways numbered 423 =

The following highways are numbered 423:

== Canada ==
- Manitoba Provincial Road 423

== Japan ==
- Japan National Route 423

== United States ==
- Florida State Road 423
  - County Road 423 (Florida)
- Louisiana Highway 423
- Maryland Route 423
- New Mexico State Road 423
- New York State Route 423
- Ohio State Route 423
- Pennsylvania Route 423
- Puerto Rico Highway 423
- Farm to Market Road 423

Preceded by 422	Lists of highways 423	Succeeded by 424
