= List of highways numbered 961 =

The following highways are numbered 961:

== United States ==
- LA 961
- PR-961
- FM 961

Preceded by 960	Lists of highways 961	Succeeded by 962
