= List of highways numbered 829 =

The following highways are numbered 829:

== United States ==
- Georgia State Route 829 (former)
- Indiana State Road 829 (former)
- Louisiana Highway 829
- Nevada State Route 829
- Pennsylvania Route 829
- Puerto Rico Highway 829

Preceded by 828	Lists of highways 829	Succeeded by 830
