= List of highways numbered 878 =

Route 878, or Highway 878, may refer to:

== United States ==
- I-878
- SR 878
- SR 878
- NY 878
- PR-878

Preceded by 877	Lists of highways 878	Succeeded by 879
