= List of highways numbered 809 =

The following highways are numbered 809:

== Costa Rica ==
- National Route 809

== United States ==
- SR 809
- LA 809 (former)
- MD 809 (former)
- PR-809
- FM 809

Preceded by 808	Lists of highways 809	Succeeded by 810
