= List of highways numbered 971 =

The following highways are numbered 971:

== United States ==
- LA 971
- PR-971
- FM 971
- SR 971
- WV 971

Preceded by 970	Lists of highways 971	Succeeded by 972
