= List of highways numbered 899 =

Route 899 may refer to:

== Canada ==
- Alberta Highway 899

== Israel ==
- Route 899 (Israel)

== United States ==
- PA 899
- PR-899

Preceded by 898	Lists of highways 899	Succeeded by 900
