= List of highways numbered 768 =

The following highways are numbered 768:

== United States ==
- LA 768 (former)
- MD 768
- SR 768
- PR-768
- SC 768
- FM 768

Preceded by 767	Lists of highways 768	Succeeded by 769
