= List of highways numbered 682 =

The following highways are numbered 682:

== United States ==
- SR 682
- LA 682
- MD 682 (former)
- PR-682
- FM 682

== Canada ==
- Saskatchewan Highway 682

Preceded by 681	Lists of highways 682	Succeeded by 683
