= List of highways numbered 920 =

The following highways have been numbered 920:

== Costa Rica ==
- National Route 920

== United States ==
- LA 920 (former)
- MD 920
- PA 920
- PR-920
- FM 920

Preceded by 919	Lists of highways 920	Succeeded by 921
