= List of highways numbered 522 =

The following highways are numbered 522:

== Afghanistan ==
- Route 522 (Afghanistan)

== Canada ==
- Alberta Highway 522
- Ontario Highway 522

== India ==
- National Highway 522 (India)

== United Kingdom ==
- A522 road

== United States ==
- US 522
- CR 522 (New Jersey CR 522)
- NM 522
- NC 522
- SR 522 (Ohio)
- PR-522
- SC 522
- SR 522 (Washington)

Preceded by 521	Lists of highways 522	Succeeded by 523
