= List of highways numbered 844 =

The following highways are numbered 844:

== India ==
- National Highway 844 (India)

== United States ==
- SR 844
- LA 844
- MD 844
- MS 844
- SR 844
- PA 844
- PR-844
- FM 844

Preceded by 843	Lists of highways 844	Succeeded by 845
