= List of highways numbered 763 =

The following highways are numbered 763:

== Canada ==
- Saskatchewan Highway 763

== United States ==
- LA 763
- MD 763
- Route 763
- PA 763 (former)
- PR-763
- SC 763
- FM 763

Preceded by 762	Lists of highways 763	Succeeded by 764
