= Uspenovka, Bureysky District, Amur Oblast =

Uspenovka Успеновка
- Selo
- Location within Amur Oblast Location within Russia
- Coordinates: 49°01′N 129°13′E
- Country: Russia
- Region: Amur Oblast
- District: Bureysky District
- Time zone: UTC+9:00

Uspenovka (Russian: Успеновка) is a rural locality (a selo) and the administrative center of Uspenovsky Selsoviet of Bureysky District, Amur Oblast, Russia. The population was 269 as of 2018. There are 6 streets.

== Geography ==
Uspenovka is located on the right bank of the Raychikha River, 65 km west of Novobureysky (the district's administrative centre) by road. Staraya Raychikha is the nearest rural locality.
