= List of highways numbered 714 =

Route 714, or Highway 714, may refer to:

== Costa Rica ==
- National Route 714

== Malaysia ==
- Malaysia Federal Route 714

== United Kingdom ==
- A714 road

== United States ==
- County Road 714 (Martin County, Florida)
- Florida State Road 714
- Kentucky Route 714
- Louisiana Highway 714
- Ohio State Route 714 (former)
- Puerto Rico Highway 714
- South Carolina Highway 714
- Tennessee State Route 714
- Virginia State Route 714 (1930-1933)

Preceded by 713	Lists of highways 714	Succeeded by 715
