= List of highways numbered 712 =

The following highways are numbered 712:

== Costa Rica ==
- National Route 712

== United States ==
- SR 712 (former)
- LA 712
- MD 712
- PR-712
- FM 712

Preceded by 711	Lists of highways 712	Succeeded by 713
