= List of highways numbered 922 =

Route 922, or Highway 922, may refer to:

== Canada ==
- Saskatchewan Highway 922

== Costa Rica ==
- National Route 922

== Cuba ==
- Road of La Tinta (6-922)

== India ==
- National Highway 922 (India)

== United Kingdom ==
- A922 road

== United States ==
- SR 922
- Iowa 922
- KY 922
- LA 922
- MD 922
- PA 922
- PR-922
- SC 922
- FM 922

Preceded by 921	Lists of highways 922	Succeeded by 923
