= List of highways numbered 884 =

The following highways are numbered 884:

== United States ==
- SR 884
- KY 884
- LA 884 (former)
- PA 884 (former)
- PR-884
- FM 884

== Canada ==
- Alberta Highway 884

Preceded by 883	Lists of highways 884	Succeeded by 885
