= List of highways numbered 686 =

Route 686, or Highway 686, may refer to:

== Canada ==
- Highway 686 Alberta Highway 686
- Highway 686 Saskatchewan Highway 686

== United Kingdom ==
- A686
- London Buses route 686

== United States ==
- SR 686 in Florida
  - SR 686A see Gateway Expressway
- KY 686 in Kentucky
- LA 686 in Louisiana
- MD 686 in Maryland
- SR 686 (former) in Nevada
- SR 686 (former) in Ohio
- FM 686 in Texas
- SR 686 in Virginia

Preceded by 685	Lists of highways 686	Succeeded by 687
