= List of highways numbered 940 =

The following highways are/were numbered 940:

== Canada ==
- Highway 940
- Highway 940

== United States ==
- SR 940 (former)
- LA 940
- MD 940
- PA 940
- PR-940
- FM 940

Preceded by 939	Lists of highways 940	Succeeded by 941
