= List of highways numbered 969 =

Route 969, or Highway 969, may refer to:

== United States ==
- SR 969 in Florida
- LA 969 in Louisiana
- MD 969 in Maryland
- PA 969 in Pennsylvania
- PR-969 in Puerto Rico
- FM 969 in Texas

Preceded by 968	Lists of highways 969	Succeeded by 970
