= 883 Matterania =

Main-belt asteroid

Discovery
- Discovered by: Max Wolf
- Discovery site: Heidelberg
- Discovery date: 14 September 1917

Designations
- Alternative designations: 1917 CP; 1927 QK

Orbital characteristics
- Epoch 31 July 2016 (JD 2457600.5)
- Uncertainty parameter 0
- Observation arc: 98.60 yr (36012 days)
- Aphelion: 2.6836 AU (401.46 Gm)
- Perihelion: 1.7946 AU (268.47 Gm)
- Semi-major axis: 2.2391 AU (334.96 Gm)
- Eccentricity: 0.19852
- Orbital period (sidereal): 3.35 yr (1223.8 d)
- Mean anomaly: 211.749°
- Mean motion: 0° 17^{m} 39.012^{s} / day
- Inclination: 4.7147°
- Longitude of ascending node: 285.565°
- Argument of perihelion: 42.223°
- Earth MOID: 0.785608 AU (117.5253 Gm)
- Jupiter MOID: 2.64779 AU (396.104 Gm)
- T_{Jupiter}: 3.605

Physical characteristics
- Synodic rotation period: 5.64 h (0.235 d)
- Absolute magnitude (H): 12.59

883 Matterania is an S-type asteroid belonging to the Flora family in the Main Belt. Its rotation period is 5.64 hours.
