= List of highways numbered 675 =

The following highways are numbered 675:

== Philippines ==
- N675 highway (Philippines)

== United States ==
- I-675
  - Interstate 675 (Georgia), a connection south of Atlanta, Georgia
  - Interstate 675 (Michigan), a loop through Saginaw, Michigan
  - Interstate 675 (Ohio), a partial bypass of Dayton, Ohio
- LA 675
- MD 675
- PR-675
- FM 675

Preceded by 674	Lists of highways 675	Succeeded by 676
