= List of highways numbered 748 =

The following highways are numbered 748:

== Costa Rica ==
- National Route 748

== India ==
- National Highway 748 (India)

== United States ==
- LA 748
- PR-748
- FM 748

Preceded by 747	Lists of highways 748	Succeeded by 749
