= List of highways numbered 985 =

The following highways are numbered 985:

== United States ==
- Interstate 985
- Florida State Road 985
- Iowa Highway 985 (former)
- Louisiana Highway 985
- Maryland Route 985
  - Maryland Route 985A
- Pennsylvania Route 985
- Farm to Market Road 985

Territories

- Puerto Rico Highway 985

Preceded by 984	Lists of highways 985	Succeeded by 986
