= List of highways numbered 875 =

The following highways are numbered 875:

== United States ==
- AR 875
- LA 875
- FM 875

| Preceded by 874 | Lists of highways 875 | Succeeded by 876 |
