= List of highways numbered 749 =

The following highways are numbered 749:

== Costa Rica ==
- National Route 749

== Ireland ==
- R749 regional road

== United States ==
- LA 749
- PR-749
- FM 749

Preceded by 748	Lists of highways 749	Succeeded by 750
