= List of highways numbered 945 =

The following highways are/were numbered 945:

== Canada ==
- Highway 945

== United States ==
- SR 945 (former)
- LA 945
- MD 945
- PA 945 (former)
- PR-945
- FM 945

Preceded by 944	Lists of highways 945	Succeeded by 946
