= R941 road (Ireland) =

Road in Ireland

R941 road
- Bóthar R941

Route information
- Length: 1 km (0.62 mi)

Location
- Country: Ireland
- Primary destinations: County Meath; leaves the N52 at Newrath Little; Terminates at the junction with the R164 at Kells

Highway system
- Roads in Ireland; Motorways; Primary; Secondary; Regional

The R941 road is a regional road in Ireland linking the N52 and the R164 in Kells in County Meath.

The road is 1 km (0.62 mi) long.

== See also ==
- Roads in Ireland
- National primary road
- National secondary road
