= List of highways numbered 459 =

The following highways are numbered 459:

== Canada ==
- Manitoba Provincial Road 459

== Japan ==
- Japan National Route 459

== United States ==
- Interstate 459
- Kentucky Route 459
- Maryland Route 459
- Montana Secondary Highway 459
- Puerto Rico Highway 459
- Tennessee State Route 459
- Farm to Market Road 459

Preceded by 458	Lists of highways 459	Succeeded by 460
