= List of highways numbered 849 =

The following highways are numbered 849:

== United States ==
- SR 849
- LA 849
- MD 849
- PA 849
- PR-849
- FM 849

Preceded by 848	Lists of highways 849	Succeeded by 850
