= List of highways numbered 931 =

The following highways are/were numbered 931:

== Costa Rica ==
- National Route 931

== Ireland ==
- R931 regional road

== United States ==
- SR 931 (former)
- SR 931
- LA 931
- MD 931
- PA 931 (former)
- PR-931
- FM 931

Preceded by 930	Lists of highways 931	Succeeded by 932
