= List of highways numbered 594 =

The following highways are numbered 594:

== Canada ==
- Alberta Highway 594
- Manitoba Provincial Road 594
- Highway 594 (Ontario)

== United States ==
- SR 594
- IL 594 (former)
- MS 594
- SR 594 (Russell Road)
- PR-594

| Preceded by 593 | Lists of highways 594 | Succeeded by 595 |
