= List of highways numbered 496 =

The following highways are numbered 496:

== United States ==
- Interstate 496
- LA 496
- MD 496
- MS 496
- PR-496
- SC 496
- FM 496

Preceded by 495	Lists of highways 496	Succeeded by 497
