= List of highways numbered 776 =

The following highways are numbered 776:

== Canada ==
- Alberta Highway 776
- New Brunswick Route 776
- Saskatchewan Highway 776

== United States ==
- Ohio State Route 776
- Puerto Rico Highway 776

Preceded by 775	Lists of highways 776	Succeeded by 777
