= List of highways numbered 743 =

The following highways are numbered 743:

== Canada ==
- Highway 743

== United States ==
- LA 743
- MD 743
- SR 743
- PA 743
- PR-743
- FM 743

Preceded by 742	Lists of highways 743	Succeeded by 744
