= List of highways numbered 711 =

The following highways are numbered 711:

== Costa Rica ==
- National Route 711

== Cuba ==
- Camagüira–Playa Jibacoa Road (2–711)

== Ireland ==
- R711 regional road

== United States ==
- US 711 (former)
- LA 711
- MD 711
- PA 711
- FM 711

Preceded by 710	Lists of highways 711	Succeeded by 712
