= List of highways numbered 744 =

The following highways are numbered 744:

== Costa Rica ==
- National Route 744

== India ==
- National Highway 744 (India)

== United States ==
- LA 744
- Route 744
- SR 744
- PR-744
- FM 744

| Preceded by 743 | Lists of highways 744 | Succeeded by 745 |
