= List of highways numbered 798 =

The following highways are numbered 798:

== United States ==
- LA 798
  - LA 798-1
  - LA 798-2
  - LA 798-3

Territories

- Puerto Rico Highway 798

Former

- Florida State Road 798

Preceded by 797	Lists of highways 798	Succeeded by 799
