= List of highways numbered 576 =

The following highways are numbered 576:

== United States ==
- LA 576
- MD 576 (former)
- SR 576
- PA Turnpike 576
- PR-576
- SC 576
- FM 576

Preceded by 575	Lists of highways 576	Succeeded by 577
