= List of highways numbered 483 =

The following highways are numbered 483:

== Brazil ==
- SP-483

== Ireland ==
- R483 regional road

== Japan ==
- Japan National Route 483

== United States ==
- Florida State Road 483
- County Road 483 (Volusia County, Florida)
- Louisiana Highway 483
- Puerto Rico Highway 483

Preceded by 482	Lists of highways 483	Succeeded by 484
