= List of highways numbered 919 =

The following highways have been numbered 919:

== United States ==
- SR 919
- LA 919 (former)
- PR-919
- FM 919

Preceded by 918	Lists of highways 919	Succeeded by 920
