= List of highways numbered 769 =

The following highways are numbered 769:

== United States ==
- LA 769 (former)
- MD 769
- PR-769
- SC 769
- FM 769

Preceded by 768	Lists of highways 769	Succeeded by 770
