= List of highways numbered 978 =

Route 978, or Highway 978, may refer to:

== Israel ==
- Israel Route 978

== United Kingdom ==
- A978 road

== United States ==
- KY 978
- LA 978
- MD 978
- PA 978
- PR-978

| Preceded by 977 | Lists of highways 978 | Succeeded by 979 |
