= List of highways numbered 676 =

The following highways are numbered 676:

== Philippines ==
- N676 highway (Philippines)

== United States ==
- I-676
- SR 676
- LA 676
- PR-676
- FM 676

Preceded by 675	Lists of highways 676	Succeeded by 677
