= List of highways numbered 896 =

The following highways are numbered 896:

== United States ==
- Collier County Road 896, Florida
- Delaware Route 896
- Georgia State Route 896 (former)
- Louisiana Highway 896
- Maryland Route 896
- Pennsylvania Route 896
- Pinellas County Road 896, Florida
- Texas Farm to Market Road 896

Preceded by 895	Lists of highways 896	Succeeded by 897
