= List of highways numbered 589 =

The following highways are numbered 589:

== Canada ==
- Alberta Highway 589
- Ontario Highway 589

== Ireland ==
- R589 road (Ireland)

== United States ==
- SR 589
- KY 589
- MD 589
- MS 589
- SR 589
- SR 589
- PR-589

Preceded by 588	Lists of highways 589	Succeeded by 590
