= List of highways numbered 655 =

The following highways are numbered 655:

== United States ==
- SR 655
- LA 655
- MD 655
- PA 655
- PR-655
- FM 655

== Canada ==
- Alberta Highway 655
- Saskatchewan Highway 655

Preceded by 654	Lists of highways 655	Succeeded by 656
