= List of highways numbered 872 =

The following highways are numbered 872:

== United States ==
- AR 872
- SR 872
- LA 872 (former)
- MD 872
- PA 872
- PR-872
- FM 872

Preceded by 871	Lists of highways 872	Succeeded by 873
