= List of highways numbered 915 =

The following highways are numbered 915:

== Canada ==
- Highway 915

== Costa Rica ==
- National Route 915

== United States ==
- SR 915
- LA 915
- MD 915
- PA 915

Preceded by 914	Lists of highways 915	Succeeded by 916
