= List of highways numbered 977 =

Route 977, or Highway 977, may refer to:

== Israel ==
- Israel Route 977

== United Kingdom ==
- A977 road

== United States ==
- KY 977
- LA 977
- MD 977
- PA 977
- PR-977

Preceded by 976	Lists of highways 977	Succeeded by 978
