= List of highways numbered 539 =

The following highways are numbered 539:

== Canada ==
- Alberta Highway 539
- Ontario Highway 539
  - Ontario Highway 539A

== India ==
- National Highway 539 (India)

== United States ==
- SR 539
- CR 539
- SR 539
- PA 539 (former)
- PR-539
- SR 539

Preceded by 538	Lists of highways 539	Succeeded by 540
