= List of highways numbered 813 =

The following highways are numbered 813:

== Costa Rica ==
- National Route 813

== Hungary ==
- Main road 813 (Hungary)

== United States ==
- LA 813
  - LA 813-1
  - LA 813-2
  - LA 813-3
- MD 813
- PR-813
- FM 813

Preceded by 812	Lists of highways 813	Succeeded by 814
