= List of highways numbered 677 =

The following highways are numbered 677:

== Philippines ==
- N677 highway (Philippines)

== United States ==
- LA 677
- MD 677 (former)
- PR-677
- FM 677
- SR 677

Preceded by 676	Lists of highways 677	Succeeded by 678
