= List of highways numbered 877 =

The following highways are numbered 877:

== United States ==
- AR 877
- LA 877
- MD 877
- SR 877
- PA 877 (former)
- PR-877
- FM 877

Preceded by 876	Lists of highways 877	Succeeded by 878
