= List of highways numbered 737 =

The following highways are numbered 737:

== Canada ==
- Saskatchewan Highway 737

== Costa Rica ==
- National Route 737

== United States ==
- Louisiana Highway 737
- Pennsylvania Route 737
- Farm to Market Road 737, two different former roads in Texas

Preceded by 736	Lists of highways 737	Succeeded by 738
