= List of highways numbered 828 =

The following highways are numbered 828:

== United States ==
- SR 828 (former)
- LA 828
- MD 828
- SR 828
- PR-828
- FM 828
- SR 828

Preceded by 827	Lists of highways 828	Succeeded by 829
