= List of highways numbered 791 =

The following highways are numbered 791:

== United States ==
- LA 791 (former)
- PA 791
- PR-791
- SC 791
- FM 791

Preceded by 790	Lists of highways 791	Succeeded by 792
