= List of highways numbered 544 =

The following highways are numbered 544:

== Canada ==
- Alberta Highway 544

== India ==
- National Highway 544 (India)

== United States ==
- SR 544
- MD 544
- CR 544
- SC 544
- SR 544

Preceded by 543	Lists of highways 544	Succeeded by 545
