= List of highways numbered 993 =

The following highways are numbered 993:

== United States ==
- LA 993
- MD 993
- MS 993 (former)
- PA 993
- PR-993
- FM 993

Preceded by 992	Lists of highways 993	Succeeded by 994
