= List of highways numbered 970 =

The following highways are numbered 970:

== Australia ==
- - Greensborough Hwy

== Canada ==
- New Brunswick Route 970
- Saskatchewan Highway 970

== United States ==
- SR 970 (Florida Route 970)
- PA 970 (Pennsylvania Route 970)
- PR-970 (Puerto Rico Route 970)
- SR 970 (Washington Route 970)

Preceded by 969	Lists of highways 970	Succeeded by 971
