= List of highways numbered 972 =

The following highways are numbered 972:

== United States ==
- SR 972
- LA 972
- MD 972
- PR-972
- FM 972
- WV 972

Preceded by 971	Lists of highways 972	Succeeded by 973
