= List of highways numbered 592 =

The following highways are numbered 592:

== United Kingdom ==
- A592 road

== United States ==
- SR 592
- LA 592
- MD 592 (former)
- NM 592
- PR-592
- FM 592

Preceded by 591	Lists of highways 592	Succeeded by 593
