= List of highways numbered 947 =

The following highways are/were numbered 947:

== United States ==
- LA 947 (former)
- PR-947
- FM 947

Preceded by 946	Lists of highways 947	Succeeded by 948
