= List of highways numbered 593 =

The following highways are numbered 593:

== United States ==
- SR 593 (former)
- LA 593
- MD 593 (former)
- SR 593
- PR-593
- FM 593

Preceded by 592	Lists of highways 593	Succeeded by 594
