= List of highways numbered 838 =

The following highways are numbered 838:

== United States ==
- SR 838
  - County Road 838 (Broward County, Florida)
- LA 838
- PR-838
- FM 838

Preceded by 837	Lists of highways 838	Succeeded by 839
