= List of highways numbered 859 =

The following highways are numbered 859:

== United States ==
- KY 859
- LA 859
- MD 859 (former)
- SR 859
- PR-859
- FM 859

Preceded by 858	Lists of highways 859	Succeeded by 860
