= List of highways numbered 987 =

The following highways are numbered 987:

== United States ==
- LA 987
  - LA 987-1
  - LA 987-2
  - LA 987-3
  - LA 987-4
  - LA 987-5
  - LA 987-6
- MD 987 (former)
- PA 987
- PR-987
- FM 987

Preceded by 986	Lists of highways 987	Succeeded by 988
