= List of highways numbered 681 =

The following highways are numbered 681:

== Cuba ==
- Hershey–Santa Cruz Road (2–681)

== United States ==
- SR 681
- MD 681 (former)
- PR-681
- FM 681

| Preceded by 680 | Lists of highways 681 | Succeeded by 682 |
