= List of highways numbered 927 =

The following highways are numbered 927:

== Canada ==
- Highway 927

== Costa Rica ==
- National Route 927

== United States ==
- LA 927
- MD 927
- PR-927
- FM 927

| Preceded by 926 | Lists of highways 927 | Succeeded by 928 |
