= List of highways numbered 943 =

The following highways are numbered 943:

== United States ==
- LA 943
- MD 943
- PR-943
- FM 943

Preceded by 942	Lists of highways 943	Succeeded by 944
