= List of highways numbered 631 =

Route 631, or Highway 631, may refer to:

== Canada ==
- Alberta Highway 631
- Ontario Highway 631
- Saskatchewan Highway 631

== United Kingdom ==
- A631 road

== United States ==
- LA 631
- MD 631
- NY 631
- PR-631
- FM 631
- SR 631

Preceded by 630	Lists of highways 631	Succeeded by 632
