= List of highways numbered 577 =

The following highways are numbered 577:

== United Kingdom ==
- A577 road

== United States ==
Alabama

- County Route 577 (Lee County, Alabama)

New Jersey

- County Route 577 (New Jersey)

Maryland

- Maryland Route 577

Territories

- Puerto Rico Highway 577

Preceded by 576	Lists of highways 577	Succeeded by 578
