= List of highways numbered 650 =

The following highways are numbered 650:

== Canada ==
- Alberta Highway 650 (defunct)
- Ontario Highway 650
- Saskatchewan Highway 650

== Israel ==
- Route 650 (Israel)

== Turkey ==
- D.650, a north-south state road in Turkey running from Karasu, Sakarya Province to Antalya.

== United States ==
- US 650 (former)
- SR 650
- MD 650
- SR 650 (former)
- SR 650
- PR-650
- Virginia State Route 650 (Fairfax County)

Preceded by 649	Lists of highways 650	Succeeded by 651
