= List of highways numbered 684 =

The following highways are numbered 684:

== United States ==
- I-684
- SR 684
- SR 684
- PR-684
- FM 684

Preceded by 683	Lists of highways 684	Succeeded by 685
