= List of highways numbered 858 =

The following highways are numbered 858:

== United States ==
- SR 858
- LA 858
- MD 858
- SR 858
- PA 858
- PR-858
- FM 858

Preceded by 857	Lists of highways 858	Succeeded by 859
