= List of highways numbered 543 =

The following highways are numbered 543:

== Australia ==
- Omeo Highway

== Canada ==
- Alberta Highway 543

== United States ==
- MD 543
- CR 543
- PR-543
- SR 543

Preceded by 542	Lists of highways 543	Succeeded by 544
