= List of highways numbered 911 =

The following highways are numbered 911:

== Canada ==
- Saskatchewan Highway 911

== Costa Rica ==
- National Route 911

== India ==
- National Highway 911 (India)

== United States ==
- LA 911 (former)
- MD 911
- PA 911 (former)
- SC 911
- FM 911

Preceded by 910	Lists of highways 911	Succeeded by 912
