= List of highways numbered 864 =

The following highways are numbered 864:

== Canada ==
- Alberta Highway 864

== Israel ==
- Route 864 (Israel)

== United States ==
- KY 864
- PA 864
- PR-864

| Preceded by 863 | Lists of highways 864 | Succeeded by 865 |
