= List of highways numbered 521 =

The following highways are numbered 521:

== Canada ==
- Alberta Highway 521

== Cuba ==
- Candelaria–San Diego de Nunez Road (1–521)

== United Kingdom ==
- A521 road

== United States ==
- U.S. Route 521
- Maryland Route 521
- County Route 521 (New Jersey)
- Ohio State Route 521
- Puerto Rico Highway 521
- South Carolina Highway 521

Preceded by 520	Lists of highways 521	Succeeded by 522
