= Uspenovka, Zavitinsky District, Amur Oblast =

Uspenovka Успеновка
- Selo
- Location within Amur Oblast Location within Russia
- Coordinates: 50°06′N 129°14′E
- Country: Russia
- Region: Amur Oblast
- District: Zavitinsky District
- Time zone: UTC+9:00

Uspenovka (Russian: Успеновка) is a rural locality (a selo) and the administrative center of Uspenovsky Selsoviet of Zavitinsky District, Amur Oblast, Russia. The population was 275 as of 2018. There are 2 streets.

== Geography ==
Uspenovka is located 18 km west of Zavitinsk (the district's administrative centre) by road. Kamyshenka is the nearest rural locality.
