= List of highways numbered 982 =

The following highways are numbered 982:

== Canada ==
- Highway 982

== United States ==
- LA 982
- PA 982
- PR-982
- FM 982

Preceded by 981	Lists of highways 982	Succeeded by 983
