= List of highways numbered 826 =

The following highways are numbered 826:

== United States ==
- SR 826
- LA 826
- MD 826
- PR-826
- FM 826

| Preceded by 825 | Lists of highways 826 | Succeeded by 827 |
