= List of highways numbered 582 =

The following highways are numbered 582:

== United States ==
- SR 582
- LA 582
- MD 582 (former)
- SR 582
- SR 582
- PA 582 (former)
- PR-582
- FM 582

Preceded by 581	Lists of highways 582	Succeeded by 583
