= List of highways numbered 481 =

The following highways are numbered 481:

== Canada ==
- Manitoba Provincial Road 481

== Hungary ==
- Main road 481 (Hungary)

== Japan ==
- Japan National Route 481

== United States ==
- Interstate 481 (former)
- Maryland Route 481
- New York State Route 481
- Pennsylvania Route 481
- Puerto Rico Highway 481

Preceded by 480	Lists of highways 481	Succeeded by 482
