= List of highways numbered 578 =

The following highways are numbered 578:

== Hungary ==
- Main road 578 (Hungary)

== United States ==
Maryland

- Maryland Route 578

Territories

- Puerto Rico Highway 578

Preceded by 577	Lists of highways 578	Succeeded by 579
