= List of highways numbered 799 =

The following highways are numbered 799:

== United States ==
- LA 799
  - LA 799-1
  - LA 799-2
- Route 799
- PR-799
- FM 799

Preceded by 798	Lists of highways 799	Succeeded by 800
