= List of highways numbered 739 =

The following highways are numbered 739:

== Costa Rica ==
- National Route 739

== Ireland ==
- R739 regional road

== United States ==
- SR 739
- SR 739
- PA 739
- PR-739
- FM 739

Preceded by 738	Lists of highways 739	Succeeded by 740
