= List of highways numbered 567 =

The following highways are numbered 567:

== United States ==
- LA 567
- MD 567 (former)
- MS 567
- PR-567
- FM 567

== Other places ==
- Highway 567
- Highway 567

Preceded by 566	Lists of highways 567	Succeeded by 568
