= List of highways numbered 756 =

The following highways are numbered 756:

== Canada ==
- Alberta Highway 756
- Saskatchewan Highway 756

== Costa Rica ==
- National Route 756

== United States ==
- LA 756
  - LA 756-1
  - LA 756-2
  - LA 756-3
- MD 756
- SR 756
- SR 756
- PA 756

Preceded by 755	Lists of highways 756	Succeeded by 757
