= List of highways numbered 887 =

The following highways are numbered 887:

== United States ==
- SR 887
- LA 887
- PR-887
- FM 887

Preceded by 886	Lists of highways 887	Succeeded by 888
