= List of highways numbered 658 =

The following highways are numbered 658:

== United States ==
- LA 658 (former)
- MD 658
- PR-658
- FM 658

== Other places ==
- Highway 658

Preceded by 657	Lists of highways 658	Succeeded by 659
