= List of highways numbered 882 =

The following highways are numbered 882:

== United States ==
- SR 882
- LA 882
- PA 882 (former)
- PR-882
- FM 882

Preceded by 881	Lists of highways 882	Succeeded by 883
