= List of highways numbered 524 =

The following highways are numbered 524:

== Ireland ==
- R524 road (Ireland)

== United States ==
- SR 524
- LA 524
- MD 524
- PA 524
- PR-524
- FM 524
- SR 524

Preceded by 523	Lists of highways 524	Succeeded by 525
