= List of highways numbered 671 =

The following highways are numbered 671:

== Philippines ==
- N671 highway (Philippines)

== United States ==
- LA 671
- MD 671 (former)
- PR-671
- FM 671

== Other places ==
- Highway 671

Preceded by 670	Lists of highways 671	Succeeded by 672
