= List of highways numbered 558 =

The following highways are numbered 558:

== United States ==
- SR 558
- LA 558
- MD 558 (former)
- MS 558
- SR 558
- PR-558
- FM 558

== Other places ==
- Highway 558

| Preceded by 557 | Lists of highways 558 | Succeeded by 559 |
