= Uspenovka, Republic of Bashkortostan =

Uspenovka Успеновка
- Village
- Location within Bashkortostan Location within Russia
- Coordinates: 55°41′N 54°58′E
- Country: Russia
- Region: Bashkortostan
- District: Dyurtyulinsky District
- Time zone: UTC+5:00

Uspenovka (Russian: Успеновка) is a rural locality (a village) in Mayadykovsky Selsoviet, Dyurtyulinsky District, Bashkortostan, Russia. The population was 426 as of 2010. There is 1 street.

== Geography ==
Uspenovka is located 39 km north of Dyurtyuli (the district's administrative centre) by road. Atachevo is the nearest rural locality.
