= List of highways numbered 979 =

The following highways are numbered 979:

== United States ==
- Iowa 979
- KY 979
- LA 979
- MD 979
- PA 979 (former)
- PR-979
- FM 979

Preceded by 978	Lists of highways 979	Succeeded by 980
