= List of highways numbered 787 =

Route 787, or Highway 787, may refer to:

== Canada ==
- Saskatchewan Highway 787

== United States ==
- I-787
- KY 787
- MD 787
- SR 787
- NY 787
- PR-787
- FM 787

Preceded by 786	Lists of highways 787	Succeeded by 788
