= Interstate 490 =

Interstate 490 may refer to the following Interstate Highways in the United States:

- Interstate 490 (New York) in Rochester, New York
- Interstate 490 (Ohio) in Cleveland, Ohio
- Interstate 490 (Illinois) currently being built west of Chicago
