= List of highways numbered 583 =

The following highways are numbered 583:

== United Kingdom ==
- A583 road

== United States ==
- SR 583
- LA 583
- MD 583 (former)
- PR-583
- FM 583
- CR 583

Preceded by 582	Lists of highways 583	Succeeded by 584
