= List of highways numbered 820 =

The following highways are numbered 820:

== United States ==
- I-820
- SR 820
- LA 820
- MD 820
- PA 820 (former)
- PR-820
- FM 820

Preceded by 819	Lists of highways 820	Succeeded by 821
