= List of highways numbered 745 =

The following highways are numbered 745:

== Canada ==
- Alberta Highway 745 (former)
- New Brunswick Route 745
- Saskatchewan Highway 745

== Costa Rica ==
- National Route 745

== United States ==
- SR 745
- SR 745
- PR-745

Preceded by 744	Lists of highways 745	Succeeded by 746
