= List of highways numbered 991 =

The following highways are numbered 991:

== United States ==
- LA 991
- MD 991
- PA 991 (former)
- PR-991
- FM 991

Preceded by 990	Lists of highways 991	Succeeded by 992
