= List of highways numbered 757 =

The following highways are numbered 757:

== Canada ==
- Alberta Highway 757

== Costa Rica ==
- National Route 757

== United States ==
- LA 757
- SR 757
- SR 757
- PR-757

Preceded by 756	Lists of highways 757	Succeeded by 758
