= List of highways numbered 767 =

The following highways are numbered 767:

== Canada ==
- Highway 767

== United States ==
- SR 767 (former)
- LA 767
- SR 767
- SR 767
- FM 767

Preceded by 766	Lists of highways 767	Succeeded by 768
