= List of highways numbered 850 =

The following highways are numbered 850:

== Canada ==
- Alberta Highway 850

== Cuba ==
- 2–850

== United States ==
- SR 850 in Florida
- LA 850 in Louisiana
- SR 850 in Ohio
- PA 850 in Pennsylvania
- PR-850 in Puerto Rico
- SC 850 in South Carolina (former)

Preceded by 849	Lists of highways 850	Succeeded by 851
