= List of highways numbered 965 =

Route 965, or Highway 965, may refer to:

== Canada ==
- Highway 965 in Saskatchewan

== India ==
- NH 965 in Maharashtra

== United States ==
- Iowa 965 in Iowa
- LA 965 in Louisiana
- MD 965 in Maryland
- PA 965 in Pennsylvania
- PR-965 in Puerto Rico

Preceded by 964	Lists of highways 965	Succeeded by 966
