= List of highways numbered 883 =

The following highways are numbered 883:

== Ireland ==
- R883 regional road

== United States ==
- LA 883
  - LA 883-1
  - LA 883-2
- PA 883 (former)
- FM 883

Preceded by 882	Lists of highways 883	Succeeded by 884
