= List of highways numbered 545 =

The following highways are numbered 545:

== Canada ==
- Highway 545
- PR 545

== United States ==
- MD 545
- CR 545
- SR 545
- PR-545

Preceded by 544	Lists of highways 545	Succeeded by 546
