= List of highways numbered 868 =

The following highways are numbered 868:

== United States ==
- LA 868
- MD 868
- PA 868
- PR-868
- FM 868

Preceded by 867	Lists of highways 868	Succeeded by 869
