= List of highways numbered 881 =

The following highways are numbered 881:

== United States ==
- LA 881
- PA 881 (former)
- FM 881

| Preceded by 880 | Lists of highways 881 | Succeeded by 882 |
