= List of highways numbered 717 =

The following highways are numbered 717:

== Costa Rica ==
- National Route 717

== United States ==
- SR 717
- LA 717
- MD 717
- PR-717
- FM 717

Preceded by 716	Lists of highways 717	Succeeded by 718
