= List of highways numbered 18A =

The following highways are numbered 18A:

== Canada ==
- Prince Edward Island Route 18A

== United States ==
- County Road 18A (Union County, Florida)
- Nebraska Spur 18A
- Nevada State Route 18A (former)
- New York State Route 18A (former)
  - County Route 18A (Otsego County, New York)
  - County Route 18A (Washington County, New York)
- Oklahoma State Highway 18A
