= List of highways numbered 741 =

The following highways are numbered 741:

== Costa Rica ==
- National Route 741

== United States ==
- Maryland Route 741
- Ohio State Route 741
- Pennsylvania Route 741
- Puerto Rico Highway 741

Preceded by 740	Lists of highways 741	Succeeded by 742
