= List of highways numbered 775 =

The following highways are numbered 775:

== United States ==
- SR 775 (former)
- LA 775 (former)
- SR 775
- PR-775
- FM 775
- SR 775

Preceded by 774	Lists of highways 775	Succeeded by 776
