= List of highways numbered 18B =

The following highways are numbered 18B:

== United States ==
- County Route 18B (Otsego County, New York)
- Nebraska Spur 18B
- New York State Route 18B (former)
- Oklahoma State Highway 18B
