= List of highways numbered 873 =

The following highways are numbered 873:

== Canada ==
- Highway 873

== United States ==
Pennsylvania

- Pennsylvania Route 873

Territories

- Puerto Rico Highway 873

Preceded by 872	Lists of highways 873	Succeeded by 874
