= List of highways numbered 764 =

The following highways are numbered 764:

== Canada ==
- Highway 764

== United States ==
- LA 764
- MD 764
- SR 764
- PA 764
- SC 764
- FM 764

Preceded by 763	Lists of highways 764	Succeeded by 765
