= List of highways numbered 975 =

The following highways are numbered 975:

== United States ==
- LA 975
- MD 975
- PR-975
- FM 975

Preceded by 200	Lists of highways 975	Succeeded by 976
