= Uspenovka, Kazakhstan =

Coordinates: 50.7747°N 61.7969°E

Uspenovka
- Village
- Interactive map of Uspenovka
- Country: Kazakhstan
- Region: Aktobe Region
- Time zone: UTC+5 (Central Asia Time)

Uspenovka is a village in the Aktobe Region of western Kazakhstan.
