= List of highways numbered 959 =

Route 959, or Highway 959, may refer to:

== Belgium ==
- N959, a National Road in Belgium

== Israel ==
- Route 959 (Israel)

== Philippines ==
- N959 highway (Philippines)

== United States ==
- SR 959 (Corridor X-1) (future Alabama state route designation for Future I-422)
- AR 959
- SR 959
- PR-959

Preceded by 958	Lists of highways 959	Succeeded by 960
