= List of highways numbered 968 =

Highway 968 can include:

== Canada ==
- Highway 968 in Saskatchewan

== United States ==
- SR 968 in Florida
- LA 968 in Louisiana
- MD 968 in Maryland
- PA 968 in Pennsylvania (former)
- PR-968 in Puerto Rico

| Preceded by 967 | Lists of highways 968 | Succeeded by 969 |
