= List of longest smartphone telephoto lenses =

Smartphones with the highest optical zoom magnification level

This is a list of smartphones with a telephoto lens that offers a focal length (35 mm equivalent) of at least 100 mm or "4× optical zoom" with an imaging area equivalent to a 1/3.5″ (inches) or larger sensor.

Smartphone lenses are often marketed in terms of "optical zoom" relative to the phone's main camera. For example, 120 mm is usually referred to as "5× optical zoom", because the main camera's focal length is commonly around 24 mm. However, only a few smartphones, such as the Sony Xperia 1 IV and V, include a true zoom lens that offers continuous optical zoom, whereas nearly all smartphones feature a collection of prime lenses interpolated by digital zoom. To fit large focal length the 2010s-era Samsung Galaxy Zoom series of phone-camera hybrids use a retractable lens design, while newer zoom-equipped phones mostly use periscope lenses.

In a fixed space, greater focal lengths further constrain the size of the image sensor. However some manufacturers have recently been able to improve image quality by using a lens with a slightly shorter focal length but a much larger sensor. For example, the Vivo X90 Pro+'s 90 mm lens still has a 60% larger effective sensor area when digitally cropped to match the field of view of the X80 Pro's 125 mm lens. (Note: The X90 Pro+'s 90 mm lens uses a 1/2″ sensor, whereas the X80 Pro's 125 mm lens uses a 1/4.4″ sensor, so the difference in area is: $\frac{90}{125}\times\frac{1/2}{1/4.4}-1 \approx 0.6$.)

This list excludes lenses using sensors smaller than 1/3.5″, which seems to be a lower bound for acceptable image quality (most compact travel zoom cameras use 1/2.3″ sensors, which are more than twice (Note: $(\frac{1/2.3}{1/3.5})^2>2$) as large).

Model	Sensor size	Maximum optical zoom (Note: Maximum "optical zoom" relative to the phone's primary camera lens)	Focal length (mm) (Note: 35mm equivalent)	Aperture	Equivalent aperture	Pixel count	Release year
Huawei Mate 40 Pro+	1/3.5"	10×	240	f/4.4	f/37	8 MP	2020
Huawei Mate 80 Pro Max	-	6.2×	140	f/3.2	-	50 MP	2025
Huawei Mate X2	1/3.5"	10×	240	f/4.4	f/37	8 MP	2021
Huawei P40 Pro	1/3.5"	5×	125	f/3.4	f/29	12 MP	2020
Huawei P40 Pro+	1/3.5"	10×	240	f/4.4	f/37	8 MP	2020
Huawei Pura 80 Ultra	1/1.28"	9.4×	212	f/3.6	-	50 MP	2025
Samsung Galaxy S4 Zoom	1/2.33"	10×	240	f/6.3	-	16 MP	2013
Samsung Galaxy K Zoom	1/2.33"	10×	240	f/6.3	-	20.7 MP	2014
Samsung Galaxy S21 Ultra	1/3.2"	10×	240	f/4.9	f/37	10 MP	2021
Samsung Galaxy S22 Ultra	1/3.5"	10×	230	f/4.9	f/42	10 MP	2022
Samsung Galaxy S23 Ultra	1/3.5"	10×	230	f/4.9	f/42	10 MP	2023
Samsung Galaxy S24 Ultra	1/2.5"	5×	115	f/3.4	f/21	50 MP	2024
Samsung Galaxy S25 Ultra	1/2.5"	5×	111	f/3.4	f/21	50 MP	2025
Oppo Find X7 Ultra	1/2.5"	6×	135	f/4.3	f/26	50 MP	2024
Oppo Find X8 Ultra	1/1.95"	6×	135	f/3.1	f/26	50 MP	2025
Oppo Find X9 Ultra	1/2.75"	10×	230	f/3.5	f/23	50 MP	2026
Sony Xperia 1 IV	1/3.5"	5×	125	f/2.8	f/24	12 MP	2022
Sony Xperia 1 V	1/3.5"	5×	125	f/2.8	f/24	12 MP	2023
Sony Xperia 1 VI	1/3.5"	7×	170	f/3.5	f/30	12 MP	2024
Sony Xperia 1 VII	1/3.5"	7×	170	f/3.5	f/30	12 MP	2025
Xiaomi Mi 10 Ultra	1/2.0"	5×	120	f/4.1	f/22	48 MP	2020
Xiaomi Mi 11 Ultra	1/2.0"	5×	120	f/4.1	f/22	48 MP	2021
Xiaomi 12S Ultra	1/2.0"	5×	120	f/4.1	f/22	48 MP	2022
Xiaomi 13 Ultra	1/2.5"	5×	120	f/3.0	f/18	50 MP	2023
Xiaomi 14 Ultra	1/2.5"	5×	120	f/2.5	f/15	50 MP	2024
Xiaomi 15 Ultra	1/1.4"	4.3×	100	f/2.6	f/10.6	200 MP	2025
Xiaomi 15T Pro	1/2.76"	5x	115	f/3.0	-	50 MP	2025
Google Pixel 6 Pro	1/2.0"	4×	104	f/3.5	f/19	48 MP	2021
Google Pixel 7 Pro	1/2.55"	5×	120	f/3.5	f/21	48 MP	2022
Google Pixel 8 Pro	1/2.55"	5×	113	f/2.8	f/17	48 MP	2023
Google Pixel 9 Pro	1/2.55"	5×	113	f/2.8	f/17	48 MP	2024
Google Pixel 10 Pro	1/2.55"	5×	113	f/2.8	f/17	48 MP	2025
Apple iPhone 15 Pro Max	1/3.2"	5×	120	f/2.8	f/21	12 MP	2023
Apple iPhone 16 Pro	1/3.2"	5×	120	f/2.8	f/21	12 MP	2024
Apple iPhone 17 Pro	1/2.55"	4×	100	f/2.8	f/17	48 MP	2025
Vivo X100 Pro	1/2.5"	4.3×	100	f/2.5	f/14	50 MP	2024

== See also ==
- List of superzoom lenses
- List of superzoom compact cameras
- List of large sensor camera phones
