= List of large sensor camera phones =

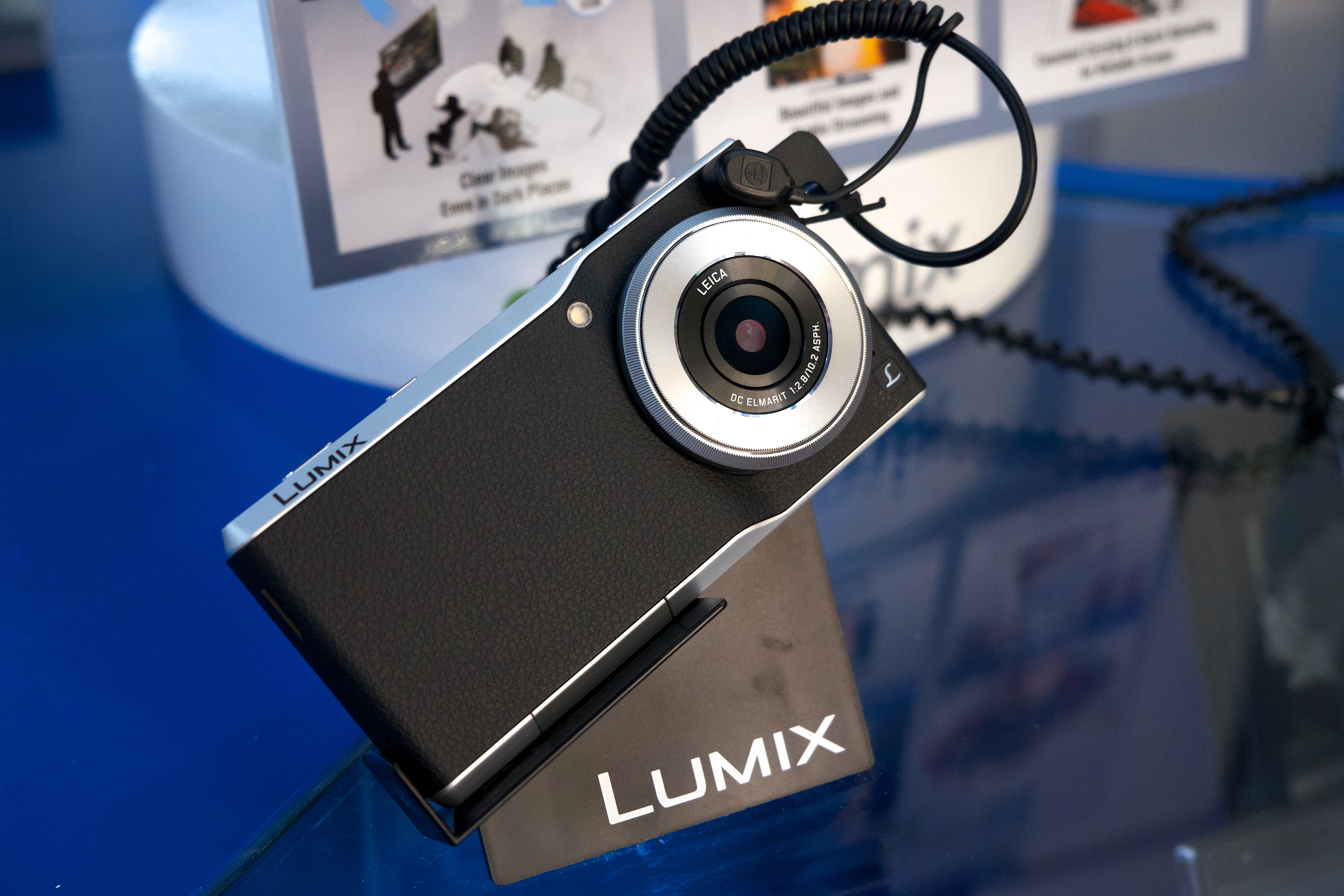
Panasonic Lumix CM1

This is a list of smartphones with a primary camera that uses a 1.0-type (“1-inch”) image sensor or larger. However, as of February 2024, there are no smartphones that use a sensor larger than 1.0-type.

The first camera phone to feature a 1.0-type sensor was the Panasonic Lumix CM1 in 2014. Seven years passed before another phone featured such a sensor. These early examples used sensors with a 3:2 aspect ratio that were originally designed for standalone digital cameras. In 2022, Sony introduced the 1.0-type IMX989 sensor with the 4:3 aspect ratio that matched existing smartphones. Most phones in the list since 2022 feature the IMX989 or its successor, the LYT-900; the Xiaomi 17 Ultra, released in China in December 2025, instead uses a 1.0-type sensor made by OmniVision and marketed as the Light Fusion 1050L.

Also note that the Sony Xperia PRO-I does not qualify for this list, because it only uses 60% (Note: 12 megapixels of the 20-megapixel sensor is 60%.) of its 1.0-type sensor. The latest Leica Leitz and Sharp Aquos R series phones do qualify because, despite using only 94% (Note: 47 megapixels of the 50-megapixel Sony IMX989 sensor is 94%.) of their 1.0-type sensors (with 4:3 aspect ratio), they maintain the same crop factor (2.7) and diagonal (1″) as a 1.0-type sensor with 3:2 aspect ratio, since that is the image circle for which their lenses were originally designed.

== Trade-offs ==
A larger sensor gathers more light for a given exposure, which improves detail and noise in low light, and it yields a shallower depth of field at the same field of view, so that backgrounds are blurred optically rather than by software.

That shallow depth of field is also a limitation. DXOMARK notes that it is poorly suited to scenes requiring a wide zone of sharpness, such as landscapes and group portraits, that it can reduce autofocus stability, and that it makes autofocus tuning harder, leaving tuning teams to choose between focus performance and noise and texture; it concludes that a bigger sensor is not always better. Some manufacturers answer this with a mechanically variable aperture: the main camera of the Huawei Pura 80 Ultra carries an f/1.6-f/4.0 variable aperture, and in GSMArena's testing the depth of field changed markedly between the two extremes, which the reviewer found useful for bringing more of a nearby subject into focus.

The lens assembly for a 1.0-type sensor is correspondingly large. Reviewing the Xiaomi 17 Ultra, Digital Camera World observed that its camera island remained very large even though one rear camera had been dropped from the previous generation, and that the phone weighs about 218 g.

Several manufacturers have since moved to slightly smaller sensors with higher pixel counts. The Oppo Find X9 Ultra of 2026 replaced the 50-megapixel 1.0-type sensor of its predecessor with a 200-megapixel 1/1.12-type sensor behind an f/1.5 lens, a combination Oppo says takes in the same amount of light while allowing a 6x in-sensor crop. The main camera of the Samsung Galaxy S26 Ultra uses a 1/1.3-type sensor, and the iPhone 18 Pro Max a 1/1.28-type one, so neither qualifies for this list.

== List ==
Model	Sensor size	Crop factor	Focal length (Note: 35mm equivalent.)	Aperture	Equivalent aperture	Pixel count	Aspect ratio	Release year
Huawei Pura 70 Ultra	1.0-type	(Note: The Sony LYT-900 and IMX989 sensors are 13.1 x 9.8mm, so the crop factor is: $\sqrt{36^2+24^2}/\sqrt{13.1^2+9.8^2}=2.6$.)2.6	23mm	f/1.6	f/4.3	50 MP	4:3	2024
Huawei Pura 80 Pro+	1.0-type	2.6	23mm	f/1.6	f/4.3	50 MP	4:3	2025
Oppo Find X6 Pro	1.0-type	2.6	23mm	f/1.8	f/4.8	50 MP	4:3	2023
Oppo Find X7 Ultra	1.0-type	2.6	23mm	f/1.8	f/4.8	50 MP	4:3	2024
Oppo Find X8 Ultra	1.0-type	2.6	23mm	f/1.8	f/4.8	50 MP	4:3	2025
Vivo X90 Pro+	1.0-type	2.6	23mm	f/1.8	f/4.8	50 MP	4:3	2022
Vivo X90 Pro	1.0-type	2.6	23mm	f/1.8	f/4.8	50 MP	4:3	2022
Vivo X100 Ultra	1.0-type	2.6	23mm	f/1.8	f/4.8	50 MP	4:3	2024
Vivo X100 Pro	1.0-type	2.6	23mm	f/1.8	f/4.8	50 MP	4:3	2023
Xiaomi 12S Ultra	1.0-type	2.6	23mm	f/1.9	f/5.0	50 MP	4:3	2022
Xiaomi 13 Pro	1.0-type	2.6	23mm	f/1.9	f/5.0	50 MP	4:3	2022
Xiaomi 13 Ultra	1.0-type	2.6	23mm	f/1.9	f/5.0	50 MP	4:3	2023
Xiaomi 14 Ultra	1.0-type	2.6	23mm	f/1.6	f/4.3	50 MP	4:3	2024
Xiaomi 15 Ultra	1.0-type	2.6	23mm	f/1.6	f/4.3	50 MP	4:3	2025
Xiaomi 17 Ultra	1.0-type	2.6	23mm	f/1.7	f/4.3	50 MP	4:3	2025
Leica Leitz Phone 1	1.0-type	2.7	19mm	f/1.9	f/5.2	20 MP	3:2	2021
Leica Leitz Phone 2	1.0-type	(Note: 47 megapixels of the 50-megapixel Sony IMX989 sensor are used, so the crop factor is: $2.6/\sqrt{47/50}=2.7$.)2.7	19mm	f/1.9	f/5.2	47 MP	4:3	2022
Leica Leitz Phone 3	1.0-type	2.7	19mm	f/1.9	f/5.2	47 MP	4:3	2024
Sharp Aquos R6	1.0-type	2.7	19mm	f/1.9	f/5.2	20 MP	3:2	2021
Sharp Aquos R7	1.0-type	2.7	19mm	f/1.9	f/5.2	47 MP	4:3	2022
Sharp Aquos R8 Pro	1.0-type	2.7	19mm	f/1.9	f/5.2	47 MP	4:3	2023
Sharp Aquos R9 Pro	1.0-type	2.6	23mm	f/1.8	f/4.8	50 MP	4:3	2025
Panasonic Lumix CM1	1.0-type	2.7	28mm	f/2.8	f/7.6	20 MP	3:2	2014

== See also ==
- List of longest smartphone telephoto lenses
- List of large sensor fixed-lens cameras
- List of superzoom compact cameras
- List of lightest mirrorless cameras
