= 808 =

808 may refer to:

== Music ==
- Roland TR-808, a drum machine
- 808 (film), a documentary about the Roland TR-808
- 808 State, British electronic group
- 808s & Heartbreak, the fourth studio album by American Hip hop artist Kanye West
- 808 (album), a 2011 album by Taiwanese Mandopop artist Wilber Pan
- "808" (Blaque song), a 1999 single by American R&B group Blaque
- "808" (Jane Zhang song), a 2017 song by Chinese singer-songwriter Jane Zhang

== Other ==
- 808 (number)
- 808 BC
- AD 808, a year in the Gregorian calendar
- Area code 808, the North American Numbering Plan area code for the U.S. state of Hawaii
- Nokia 808 PureView, a smartphone
- Nobel 808, an early plastic explosive of World War II

== See also ==
- List of highways numbered 808
