= 804 (disambiguation) =

804 may refer to:

- 804, the year
- Area code 804, a telephone area code in the U.S. state of Virginia, whose service region includes the state's capital city of Richmond
- "The 804", a common local nickname for the Greater Richmond Region (from the area code)

== See also ==
- List of highways numbered 804
