= CM1 =

CM1, CM-1 or cm^{−1} may refer to:

- The Chelmsford postcode area
- Bowers & Wilkins (B&W) CM1 loudspeaker
- A primary school grade in the French educational system
- Cooking Mama, the first game in the Cooking Mama series
- Cake Mania, the first game in the Cake Mania series
- The Panasonic Lumix DMC-CM1 smartphone
- Connection Machine Model 1, a parallel computer
- USS Baltimore (CM-1), a United States warship

In the form cm^{−1}, it may refer to:

- Inverse centimetre, unit of measurement: see Reciprocal length
