= List of highways numbered 807 =

The following highways are numbered 807:

== Costa Rica ==
- National Route 807

== United States ==
- SR 807
- LA 807
- MD 807
- SR 807
- PR-807
- FM 807
- WV 807

== Other places ==
- Highway 807

Preceded by 806	Lists of highways 807	Succeeded by 808
