= List of highways numbered 805 =

The following highways are numbered 805:

== Australia ==
(Multiple Roads)

== Costa Rica ==
- National Route 805

== United States ==
- Interstate 805
- Florida State Road 805 (former)
- Louisiana Highway 805
- Maryland Route 805
- Nevada State Route 805 (former proposal)
- Pennsylvania Route 805
- Farm to Market Road 805
- Virginia State Route 805 (Grayson County)
  - Virginia State Route 805 (1928-1933) (former)

Territories

- Puerto Rico Highway 805

Preceded by 804	Lists of highways 805	Succeeded by 806
