= List of highways numbered 802 =

The following highways are numbered 802:

== Costa Rica ==
- National Route 802

== United States ==
- SR 802
- LA 802
- MD 802
- PA 802 (former)
- PR-802
- FM 802

Preceded by 801	Lists of highways 802	Succeeded by 803
