= List of highways numbered 803 =

The following highways are numbered 803:

== Costa Rica ==
- National Route 803

== United States ==
- Louisiana Highway 803
  - Louisiana Highway 803-1
  - Louisiana Highway 803-2
  - Louisiana Highway 803-3
- Maryland State Route 803 (former)

Territories

- Puerto Rico Highway 803

Preceded by 802	Lists of highways 803	Succeeded by 804
