= Xiaomi 14 =

Series of HyperOS-based smartphones

Civi 4 Pro (Xiaomi 14 Civi) Xiaomi 14 Xiaomi 14 Pro Xiaomi 14 Ultra Xiaomi 14T Xiaomi 14T Pro
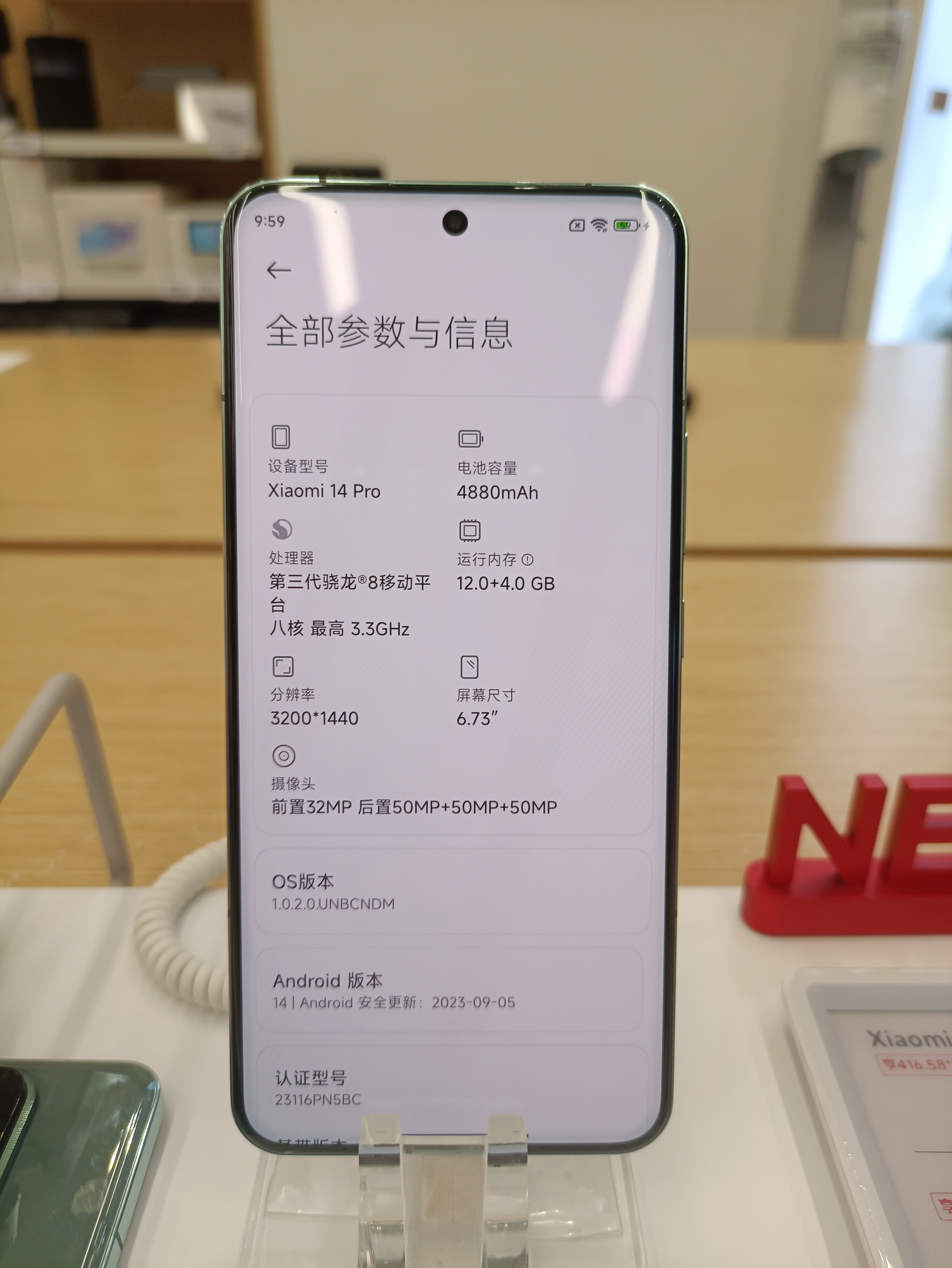
- The front of Xiaomi 14 Pro
- Manufacturer: Xiaomi
- Type: 14: smartphone 14 Pro/Ultra: phablet
- Series: Xiaomi
- First released: 14/Pro: October 26, 2023; 3 years ago 14 Ultra: February 22, 2024; 2 years ago
- Availability by region: 14/Pro: November 1, 2023; 2 years ago in China; 14 Ultra: February 27, 2024; 2 years ago in China
- Predecessor: Xiaomi 13
- Successor: Xiaomi 15
- Related: Xiaomi 14 Civi
- Compatible networks: 2G / 3G / 4G LTE / 5G NR
- Form factor: Slate
- Colors: 14: Jade Green, Black, White, Snow Mountain Pink, Ocean Blue; 14 Pro: Black, Silver, Titanium, Green
- Dimensions: 14: 152.8 mm (6.02 in) H 71.5 mm (2.81 in) W 8.2 mm (0.32 in) (glass) D 8.28 mm (0.326 in) (silicone polymer) D; 14 Pro: 161.4 mm (6.35 in) H 75.3 mm (2.96 in) W 8.49 mm (0.334 in) D; 14 Ultra: 161.4 mm (6.35 in) H 75.3 mm (2.96 in) W 9.2 mm (0.36 in) D
- Weight: 14: 193 g (6.8 oz) (glass) 188 g (6.6 oz) (silicone polymer); 14 Pro: 223 g (7.9 oz) (glass) 230 g (8.1 oz) (Titanium Special Edition); 14 Ultra: 224.4 g (7.92 oz) (black and white) 229.5 g (8.10 oz) (Dragon Crystal Blue) 229.6 g (8.10 oz) (Titanium Special Edition)
- Operating system: Original: Xiaomi HyperOS based on Android 14; Current: Xiaomi HyperOS 3 based on Android 16
- System-on-chip: Qualcomm Snapdragon 8 Gen 3 (4 nm)
- CPU: Octa-core (1x3.3 GHz Cortex-X4 & 5x3.2 GHz Cortex-A720 & 2x2.3 GHz Cortex-A520)
- GPU: Adreno 750
- Memory: 14: 8, 12 and 16 GB; 14 Pro/Ultra: 12 and 16 GB; RAM
- Storage: 256, 512, 1024 GB
- Removable storage: None
- SIM: 14: Dual SIM (Nano-SIM and Nano-SIM or Nano-SIM and eSIM, dual stand-by); 14 Pro/Ultra: Dual SIM (Nano-SIM and Nano-SIM, dual stand-by)
- Battery: 14: Li-Po 4610 mAh; 14 Pro: Li-Po 4880 mAh
- Charging: 14: Fast charging 90W Fast wireless charging 50W; 14 Pro: Fast charging 120W Fast wireless charging 50W; 14 Ultra: Fast charging 90W Fast wireless charging 80W; All: PD3.0, QC4; Reverse wireless charging 10W
- Rear camera: 14: 50 MP, f/1.6, 23mm (wide), 1/1.31", 1.2µm, dual pixel PDAF, Laser AF, OIS 50 MP, f/2.0, 75mm (telephoto), PDAF (10cm - ∞), OIS, 3.2x optical zoom 50 MP, f/2.2, 14mm, 115˚ (ultrawide); Dual-LED dual-tone flash, HDR, panorama; 14 Pro: 50 MP, f/1.4-f/4.0, 23mm (wide), 1/1.31", 1.2µm, dual pixel PDAF, Laser AF, OIS 50 MP, f/2.0, 75mm (telephoto), PDAF (10cm - ∞), OIS, 3.2x optical zoom 50 MP, f/2.2, 14mm, 115˚ (ultrawide), AF; Leica lens, Dual-LED dual-tone flash, HDR, panorama; Dual-LED dual-tone flash, HDR, panorama; All: 8K@24fps (HDR), 4K@24/30/60fps (HDR10+), 1080p@30/120/240/960fps, 720p@1920fps, gyro-EIS
- Front camera: 32 MP, f/2.5, 26mm (wide), 0.7µm; HDR, panorama; 4K@30/60fps, 1080p@30/60fps, gyro-EIS
- Display: 14: 6.36 in (162 mm), 1200 x 2670 px resolution, 20:9 ratio (~460 ppi density) OLED Gorilla® Glass Victus® 2; 14 Pro/Ultra: 6.73 in (171 mm), 3200 x 1440 px resolution, 20:9 ratio (~521 ppi density) AMOLED, 68B colors, 120Hz refresh rate, Dolby Vision, HDR10+, 1100 nits (peak), Dragon Crystal Glass
- Sound: Stereo speakers
- Connectivity: Wi-Fi 802.11 a/b/g/n/ac/6e/7 (market dependent), dual-band, Wi-Fi Direct; Bluetooth 5.4, A2DP, LE
- Data inputs: Multi-touch screen; USB Type-C 3.2; Fingerprint scanner (under display, optical); Accelerometer; Gyroscope; Compass; Color spectrum; Proximity sensor
- Water resistance: IP68
- Model: 14: 23127PN0CC, 23127PN0CG; 14 Pro: 23116PN5BC; 14 Pro Ti Satellite: 2311BPN23C; 14 Ultra: 24031PN0DC, 24030PN60G
- Codename: 14: houji 14 Pro: shennong 14 Ultra: aurora
- Website: www.mi.com/xiaomi-14/; www.mi.com/xiaomi-14-pro/

The Xiaomi 14 is a series of Android-based smartphones manufactured by Xiaomi that succeeds the Xiaomi 13 series. The series is part of the company's flagship series. The Xiaomi 14 and 14 Pro, the first phones to feature a Qualcomm Snapdragon 8 Gen 3 System On Chip, were announced on 26 October 2023 and were released in China on 1 November 2023. The Xiaomi 14 Ultra was released on February 22, 2024, in China alongside the Xiaomi Pad 6S Pro.

The global launch of the Xiaomi 14 series happened at MWC 2024 on February 25, 2024, in Barcelona, Spain.

== Design ==
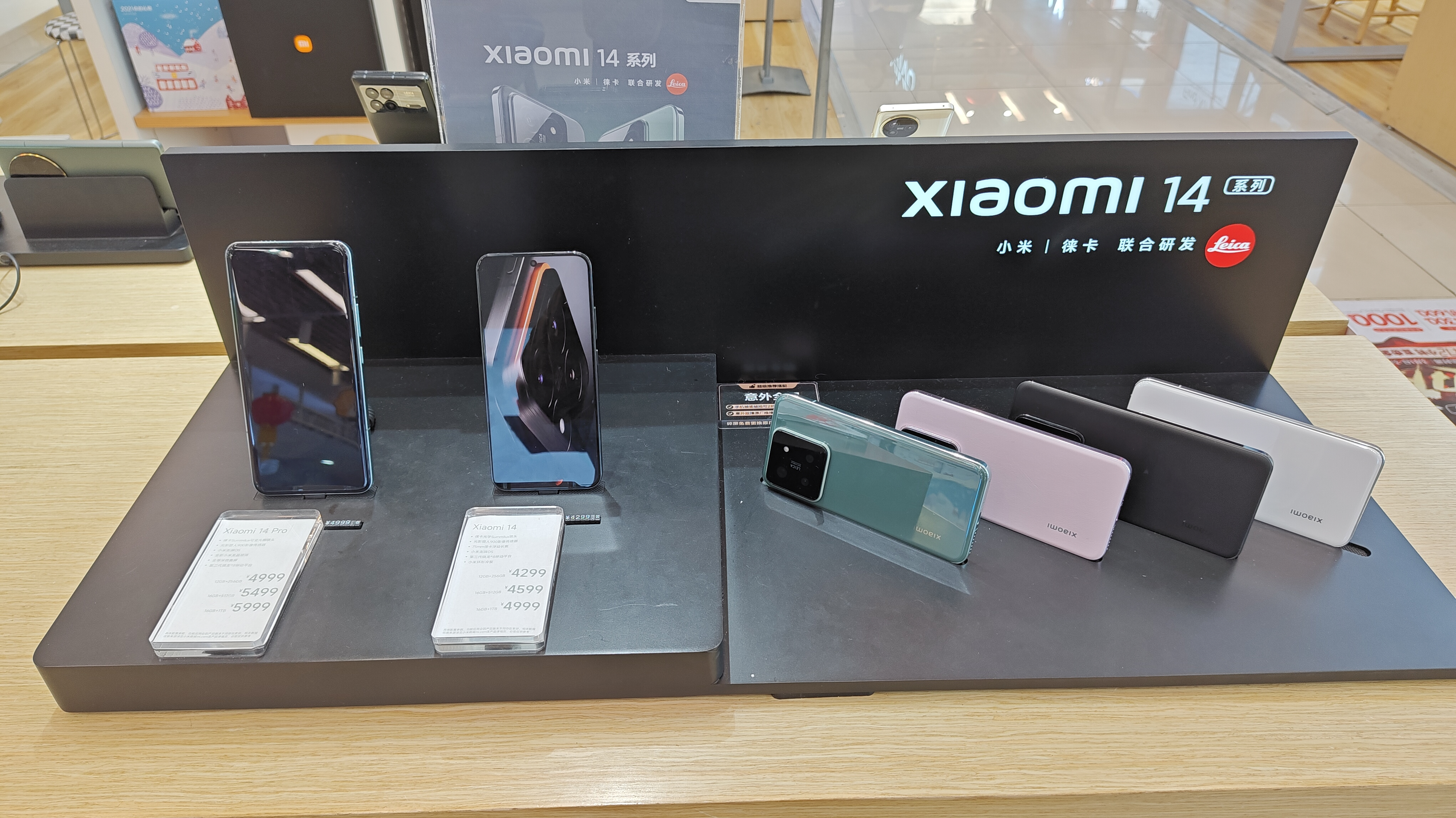
The front of the Xiaomi 14 Pro and Xiaomi 14 and color options of the Xiaomi 14

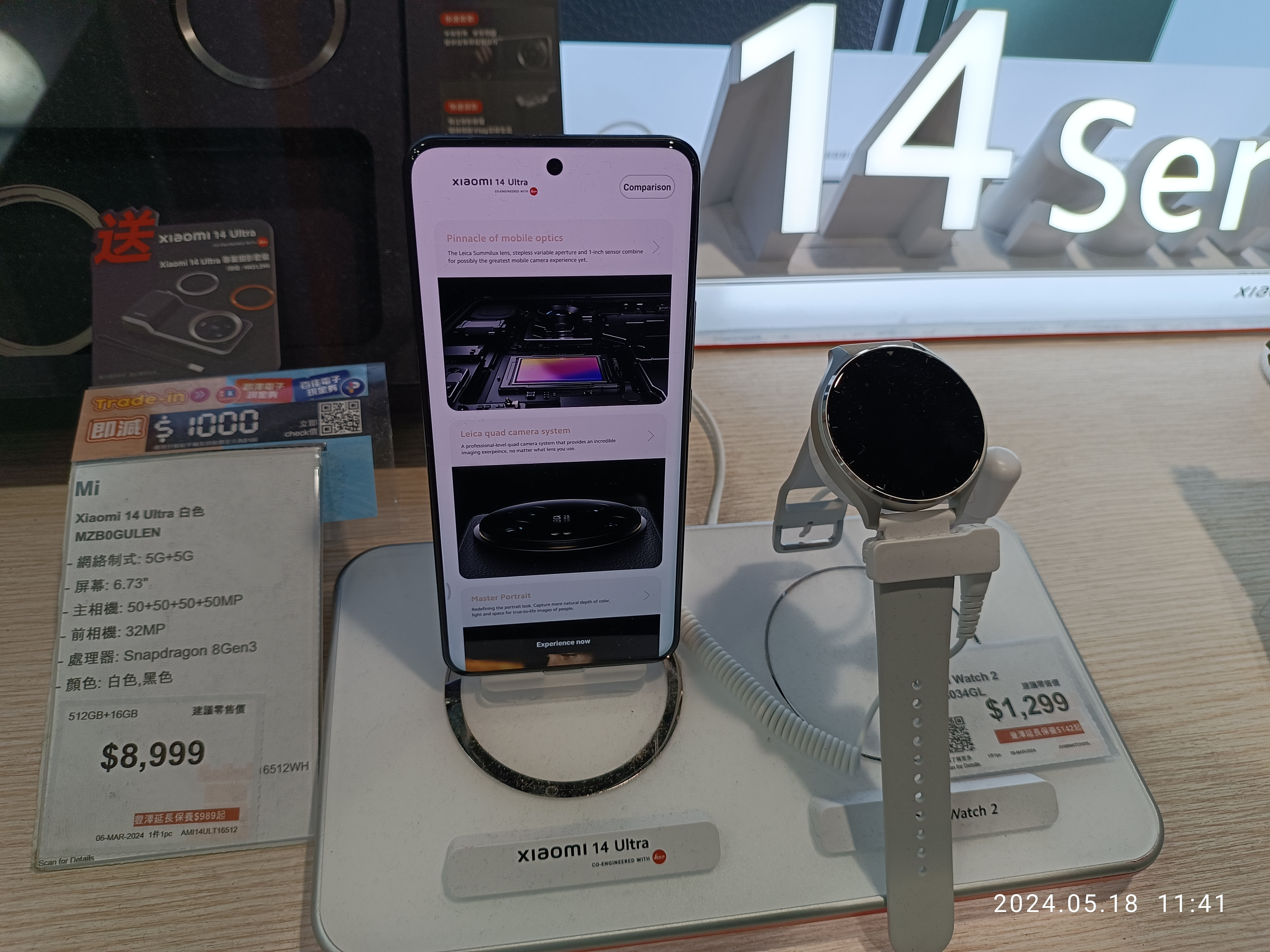
The Xiaomi 14 Ultra (L) and Xiaomi Watch 2 (R)

The Xiaomi 14 features a flat front made of Corning Gorilla Glass Victus, meanwhile the Xiaomi 14 Pro has a front with curved side edges made of in-house Xiaomi Shield (Longjing) Glass. The Xiaomi 14 Ultra, as the Pro model, features a front made of Shield Glass, but it is curved around the perimeter, though not as prominently as on the sides of the Pro model.

The back of the Xiaomi 14 is made of a silicone polymer material in the Snow Mountain Powder color option and glass in other color options, the Xiaomi 14 Pro features the back made of glass in all color options, while on the Xiaomi 14 Ultra it is made of glass in the Dragon Crystal Blue color and eco leather in other color options.

The frame of all three models is generally made of aluminium but the Xiaomi 14 Pro and Xiaomi 14 Ultra offer Titanium Special Editions with the titanium frame.

The only noticeable design change of the Xiaomi 14 compared to the Xiaomi 13 is the camera island, which has no dividing lines and features a different arrangement of elements, such as three camera lenses, LED flash and Leica logo. The Xiaomi 14 Pro, compared to the Xiaomi 13 Pro, features a flatter back and a consistent frame width on all sides. Meanwhile, the Xiaomi 14 Ultra retains mostly identical to its predecessor design but includes the bezel around the camera island and lacks a bump on the upper part of the back.

All modes have IP68 dust and water resistance.

On the bottom side, there is a dual SIM tray, a microphone, a USB-C port and a speaker. On the top of the Xiaomi 14 Pro and Xiaomi 14 Ultra, there is a second speaker. On the right side, there is the volume rocker and the power button. Elements such as the IR port, an additional microphone, have been moved to the camera island.

On the global market, the Xiaomi 14 was available in black, white, and Jade Green color options. In China, the Xiaomi 14 was also available in Snow Mountain Powder (pink), and Ocean Blue (light blue)

The Xiaomi 14 Pro was available in black, white, Jade Green, and Titanium Special Edition color options.

On the global market, the Xiaomi 14 Ultra was available in black and white color options. In China, the Xiaomi 14 Ultra was also available in Dragon Crystal Blue and Titanium Special Edition.

| Xiaomi 14 | | Xiaomi 14 Pro | | Xiaomi 14 Ultra | |
| Color | Name | Color | Name | Color | Name |
|---|---|---|---|---|---|
| | Black | | Black | | Black |
| | White | | White | | White |
| | Jade Green | | Jade Green | | Dragon Crystal Blue |
| | Snow Mountain Powder | | Titanium Special Edition | | Titanium Special Edition |

== Specifications ==
=== Hardware ===
==== Platform ====
The Xiaomi 14 and Xiaomi 14 Pro are the first smartphones to receive the flagship Qualcomm Snapdragon 8 Gen 3 SoC with an Adreno 750 GPU. The Xiaomi 14 Ultra uses the same platform.

==== Battery ====
The smartphones feature non-removable Li-Po batteries with a capacity of 4610 mAh in the Xiaomi 14, 4880 mAh in the Xiaomi 14 Pro, 5000 mAh in the global model of the Xiaomi 14 Ultra and 5300 mAh in the Chinese model of the Xiaomi 14 Ultra.

The Xiaomi 14 and 14 Ultra support 90 W fast wired charging, and the Xiaomi 14 Pro supports 120 W fast wired charging. The Xiaomi 14 and Xiaomi 14 Pro also support 50 W fast wireless charging and the Xiaomi 14 Ultra supports an 80 W fast wireless charging, which, at the time of release, is the most powerful wireless charging since the Xiaomi Mi 11 Ultra. All three models feature a 5 W reverse wireless charging support.

==== Camera ====
Xiaomi 14 and Xiaomi 14 Pro feature a triple camera setup consisting of the following lenses:

- 50 MP wide-angle lens with an f/1.6 aperture on the base model and an adjustable aperture ranging from f/1.4 to f/4.0 on the Pro model, featuring phase detection dual pixel autofocus, laser autofocus, and optical image stabilization;
- 50 MP telephoto lens with an f/2.0 aperture, 3.2x optical zoom, phase detection autofocus, and optical image stabilization;
- 50 MP ultrawide-angle lens with an f/2.2 aperture, a 115° field of view, and autofocus on the Pro model.

On the other hand, the Xiaomi 14 Ultra features a quad-camera setup consisting of the following lenses:

- 50 MP 1-inch Sony LYT-900 wide-angle lens with an adjustable aperture ranging from f/1.6 to f/4.0, multi-directional phase detection autofocus, laser autofocus, and optical image stabilization;
- 50 MP Sony IMX858 telephoto lens with an f/1.8 aperture, 3.2x optical zoom, phase detection dual pixel autofocus, and optical image stabilization;
- 50 MP Sony IMX858 periscope telephoto lens with an f/2.5 aperture, 5x optical zoom, phase detection dual pixel autofocus, and optical image stabilization;
- 50 MP Sony IMX858 ultrawide-angle lens with an f/1.8 aperture, a 123° field of view, and phase detection dual pixel autofocus.

In addition, the Xiaomi 14 Ultra features a TOF 3D camera for depth measurement. All models also use LEICA SUMMILUX optics.

The main cameras of the Xiaomi 14 and Xiaomi 14 Pro can record video at up to 8K@24fps, while the main camera of the Xiaomi 14 Ultra can record video at up to 8K@30fps.

All three models also feature a 32 MP front-facing camera with an f/2.5 aperture and the ability to record video at up to 4K@60fps.

==== Display ====
The models feature an LTPO AMOLED display with an adaptive 1–120 Hz refresh rate, Dolby Vision, HDR10+, a 20:9 aspect ratio, a centered circular cutout for the front-facing camera, and an under-display optical fingerprint sensor. The display of the Xiaomi 14 has 6.36-inch diagonal, 2670×1200 resolution, and a 460 ppi pixel density, while the display of the Xiaomi 14 Pro and Xiaomi 14 Ultra have 6.73-inch diagonal, 3200 × 1440 (QHD+) resolution, and a 522 ppi pixel density.

==== Sound ====
The smartphones feature stereo speakers with Dolby Atmos support. In the Xiaomi 14 the earpiece doubles as the second speaker, while the Xiaomi 14 Pro and Xiaomi 14 Ultra feature a dedicated second speaker on the top of the frame.

==== Memory ====
The Xiaomi 14 was available in 8 GB/256 GB, 12 GB/256 GB, 16 GB/512 GB, and 16 GB/1 TB memory configurations, while the Xiaomi 14 Pro and Xiaomi 14 Ultra were available in 12 GB/256 GB, 16 GB/512 GB, and 16 GB/1 TB memory configurations

==== Connectivity ====
Xiaomi 14 Pro Titanium Edition and Xiaomi 14 Ultra are the first Xiaomi phones to support satellite communication.

=== Software ===
The Xiaomi 14 and Xiaomi 14 Pro are the first smartphones to receive the new Xiaomi HyperOS operating system, that succeeds MIUI. On both models, Xiaomi HyperOS is based on Android 14. Xiaomi 14 Ultra features the same software. Later, all three models were updated to Xiaomi HyperOS 2 based on Android 15. Later in November of 2025, all Xiaomi Smartphones (Model 14 - Better Models) got updated to HyperOS 3 Based on Android 16.

== See also ==
- List of large sensor camera phones
- List of longest smartphone telephoto lenses
