= List of highways numbered 801 =

Route 801, or Highway 801, may refer to:

== Australia ==
- - Tasmania

== Canada ==
- Alberta Highway 801
- Ontario Highway 801

== Costa Rica ==
- National Route 801

== United Kingdom ==
- A801 road

== United States ==
- SR 801 (former)
- KY 801
- MD 801
- NC 801
- PR-801
- Virginia State Route 801 (1928)
- SR 801 (former)

Preceded by 800	Lists of highways 801	Succeeded by 802
