= List of highways numbered 806 =

The following highways are numbered 806:

== Costa Rica ==
- National Route 806

== United States ==
- SR 806
- LA 806
- MD 806
- PR-806
- FM 806

Preceded by 805	Lists of highways 806	Succeeded by 807
