= List of highways numbered 808 =

The following highways are numbered 808:

== United States ==
- SR 808
- LA 808
- MD 808
- PA 808 (former)
- PR-808

== Canada ==
- Ontario Highway 808

Preceded by 807	Lists of highways 808	Succeeded by 809
