= Panasonic Lumix DMC-CM1 =

Camera smartphone model

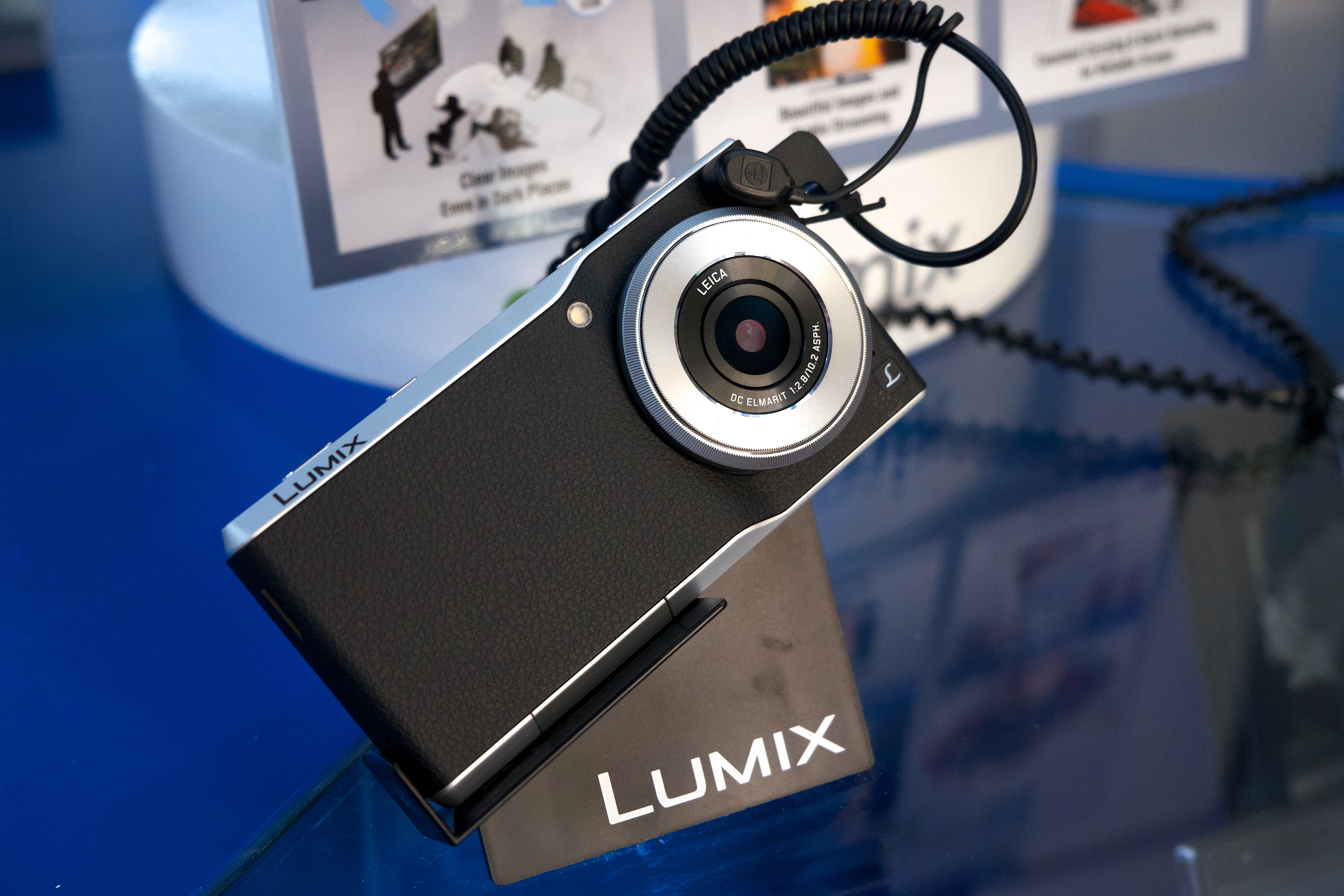

Overview
- Maker: Panasonic

Lens
- Lens: 28mm equivalent focal length
- F-numbers: f/2.8 at the widest

Sensor/medium
- Sensor type: CMOS sensor
- Sensor size: 1 inch type
- Maximum resolution: 20 megapixels
- Film speed: 100–25600
- Recording medium: microSD memory cards up to a capacity of 128 GB
- Storage media: 16 GB internal

Image processing
- Image processor: Venus engine

General
- Video recording: 2160p at 15fps, 1080p at 30fps
- LCD screen: 4.7-inch FullHD (1080p) colour touch screen
- Weight: 204 g (7 oz)

Panasonic Lumix DMC-CM1
- Manufacturer: Panasonic
- Operating system: Android 5.0
- CPU: 2.3 GHz Qualcomm Snapdragon 801, quad-core
- Memory: 2 GB RAM
- Battery: 2600 mAh, 18 Watts via Qualcomm Quick Charge 2.0
- Rear camera: 20 MP 1" sensor, 10.2 mm f/2.8 lens
- Front camera: 1.1 MP

The Panasonic Lumix DMC-CM1 is a large-sensor camera smartphone announced by Panasonic on 15 September, 2014 and released in December of the same year in Germany, France and Great Britain only. It was also released in the USA later, in summer 2015.

== Description ==
Panasonic Lumix DMC-CM1 was, for years, the smartphone with the largest camera sensor. As of 2023, there are no smartphones with bigger sensors, but others have matched it. On its launch, it surpassed the Nokia 808 Pureview (2012) with 1/1.2" sensor, and also was the slimmest camera with 1" sensor. It is also the only smartphone that takes any external lens (37mm or any other with a step ring) like any other dedicated camera.

The combination of an f/2.8 lens and 1 inch sensor gave it a hitherto unprecedented ability for (unsimulated) shallow depth of field. Forbes reserved judgement on the image quality given review samples were not available, writing "it remains to be seen whether a 1-inch sensor and Leica lens is enough to elevate the image quality of DMC-CM1 sufficiently high above the best smartphones". It features a variable aperture from f/2.8 to f/11, with f-stops at f/3.2, f/3.5, f/4.0, f/4.5, f/5.0, f/5.6, f/6.3, f/7.1, f/8.0, and more.

It is able to record video with 2160p at 15 frames per second and 1080p at 30 frames per second. It is equipped with manual camera controls and allows for a maximum light sensitivity of ISO 25600.

== See also ==
- List of large sensor camera phones
