= List of highways numbered 804 =

The following highways are numbered 804:

== Costa Rica ==
- National Route 804

== United States ==
- SR 804
- LA 804 (former)
- MD 804
- PR-804
- FM 804

Preceded by 803	Lists of highways 804	Succeeded by 805
