= Vivo X100 =

Flagship smartphone series by Vivo

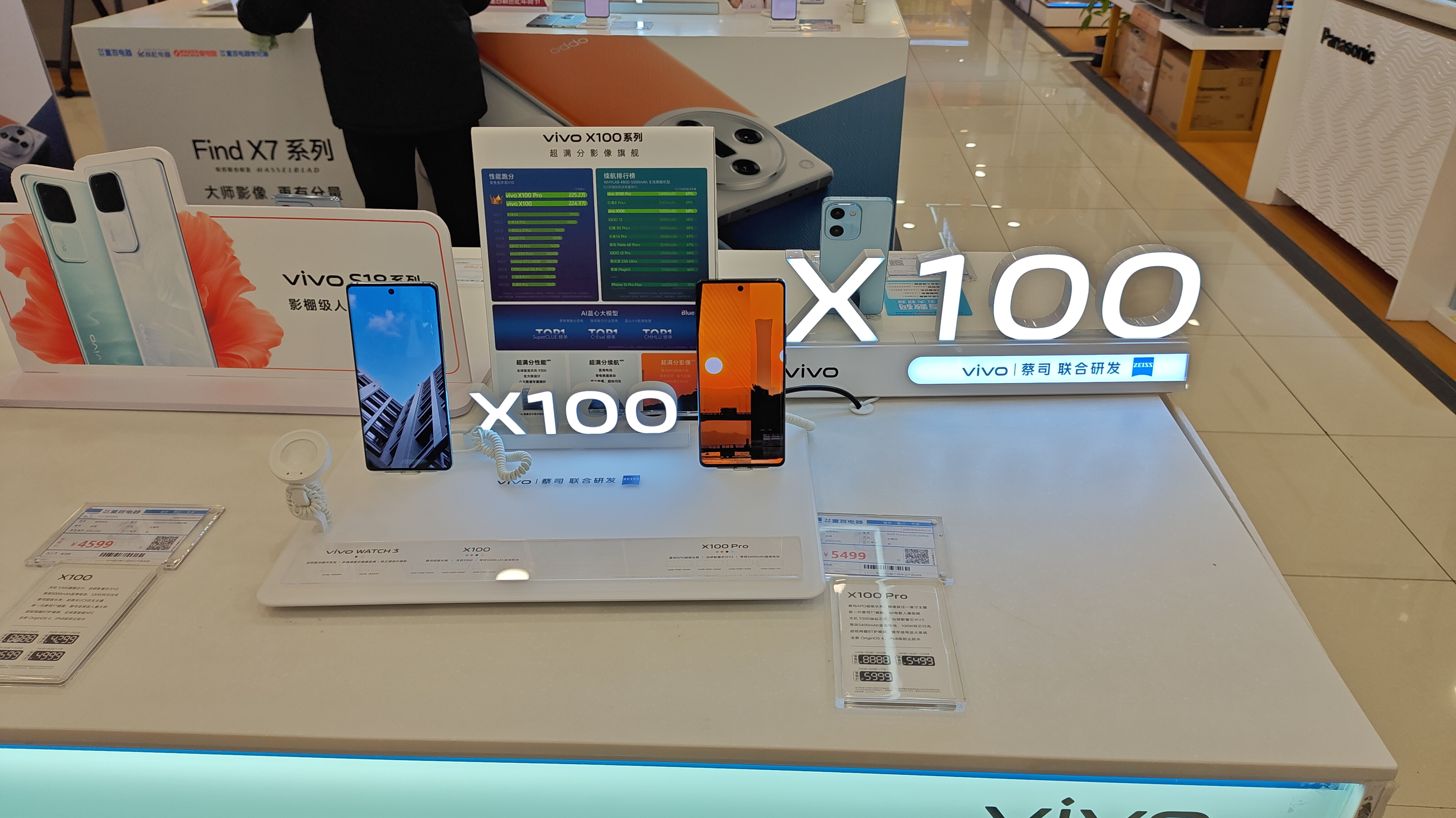
- Vivo X100 (L) and Vivo X100 Pro (R)
- Manufacturer: Vivo
- Type: Smartphone
- Series: Vivo X series
- First released: November 13, 2023; 2 years ago
- Availability by region: November 21, 2023
- Predecessor: Vivo X90
- Successor: Vivo X200
- Compatible networks: 2G / 3G / 4G LTE / 5G NR
- Form factor: Slate
- Colors: Asteroid Black, Star Trail Blue, Sunset Orange (vegan leather), White
- Dimensions: X100: 164 mm (6.5 in) H 75.2 mm (2.96 in) W 8.5 mm (0.33 in) D
- Weight: X100: 205 g (7.2 oz)
- Operating system: OriginOS 4 (China); Funtouch OS 14 (based on Android 14)
- System-on-chip: X100: MediaTek Dimensity 9300
- CPU: X100: Octa-core (1x 3.25 GHz Cortex-X4 & 3x 2.85 GHz Cortex-X4 & 4x 2.00 GHz Cortex-A720)
- GPU: X100: ARM Mali-G720 MC12 1300MHz
- Memory: 12GB/16GB LPDDR5X RAM
- Storage: X100: 256GB/512GB/1TB UFS 4.0
- Removable storage: None
- SIM: Dual SIM (Nano-SIM, dual stand-by)
- Battery: Li-Po 5000 mAh
- Charging: Fast charging 120W (100% in 27 min)
- Rear camera: X100: 50 MP, Sony IMX920, f/1.57, (wide), 1/1.31", 1.2µm, PDAF, Laser AF, OIS; 64 MP, Omnivision OV64B, f/2.6, 70mm (periscope telephoto), 1/2.0", 0.70µm, PDAF, 3x optical zoom; 50 MP, Samsung JN1, f/2.0, 15mm (ultrawide), 1/2.76", 0.64µm, AF; Zeiss T* lens coating; 8K@30fps, 4K@30/60fps, 1080p@30/60/120/240fps, gyro-EIS
- Front camera: 32 MP, f/2.0, 21mm (wide), 1/2.8", 0.8µm; 4K@30fps, 1080p@30fps
- Display: 6.78 in (172 mm); 1260 x 2800 px resolution, 20:9 ratio (~452 ppi density); AMOLED, 1B colors, 120Hz LTPO, HDR10+, 3000 nits peak Curved display
- Sound: Stereo speakers No 3.5mm jack
- Connectivity: Wi-Fi 802.11 a/b/g/n/ac/6e/7, tri-band, Wi-Fi Direct; Bluetooth 5.4, A2DP, LE, aptX HD; NFC; Infrared port
- Data inputs: Multi-touch screen; USB-C; Fingerprint scanner (under display, optical); Accelerometer; Gyroscope; Proximity sensor; Compass; Color spectrum
- Water resistance: IP68 dust/water resistant
- Website: www.vivo.com/en/products/x100

Vivo X100 is a series of Android-based flagship smartphones developed and manufactured by Vivo. It is the successor to the Vivo X90 series in Vivo's premium X lineup. The series consists of three models: X100, X100 Pro, and X100 Ultra (released later in May 2024).

== Specifications ==
=== Design ===
The Vivo X100 features a curved AMOLED display with a center-aligned punch-hole camera. The rear camera module uses an asymmetrical "Sunset Eclipse" design with Zeiss branding. The frame is made of aluminum with IP68 rating for dust and water resistance.

=== Performance ===
The X100 is powered by the MediaTek Dimensity 9300 chipset, featuring an all-big-core design with four Cortex-X4 cores and four Cortex-A720 cores. It's paired with LPDDR5X RAM and UFS 4.0 storage. The phone scored over 2.2 million points in AnTuTu benchmarks at launch.

=== Camera ===
The triple camera system developed in partnership with Zeiss includes:

- 50MP main (1/1.31" Sony IMX920, f/1.57)
- 64MP periscope telephoto (3x optical zoom)
- 50MP ultrawide (115° FOV)

The system features Zeiss T* lens coating and supports 8K video recording. Vivo's V3 imaging chip enables advanced computational photography features like Night Vision and Astro Mode.

=== Software ===
The X100 runs OriginOS 4 (Chinese models) or Funtouch OS 14 (global models) based on Android 14. Vivo has promised to receive 4 major Android updates and 5 years of security patches.

== Reception ==
The X100 received positive reviews for its camera performance and battery life. TechRadar praised its "outstanding low-light photography" and "excellent battery longevity", while noting the lack of wireless charging as a drawback.

GSM Arena noted the Dimensity 9300's performance "rivals the best from Qualcomm" while being more power efficient.

== Variants ==
- X100: Base model with 6.78" display and 5000mAh battery
- X100 Pro: Adds a 1-inch IMX989 main sensor and 100W wired/50W wireless charging
- X100 Ultra (released May 2024): Features a 200MP periscope camera with 10x optical zoom

== See also ==
- List of large sensor camera phones
- Vivo X90
