= Vivo X90 =

2022 Android based smartphones manufactured by Vivo

Vivo X90 Vivo X90 Pro Vivo X90 Pro+ Vivo X90s
- Brand: Vivo
- Manufacturer: Vivo
- Type: Smartphone
- Series: Vivo X series
- First released: May 5, 2023; 3 years ago
- Availability by region: November 30, 2022 (X90); December 6, 2022 (X90 Pro/Pro+)
- Predecessor: Vivo X80
- Successor: Vivo X100
- Compatible networks: 2G / 3G / 4G LTE / 5G NR
- Form factor: Slate
- Colors: Breeze Blue, Asteroid Black
- Dimensions: X90: 165 mm (6.5 in) H 75.2 mm (2.96 in) W 8.3 mm (0.33 in) D; X90 Pro: 164.1 mm (6.46 in) H 74.5 mm (2.93 in) W 9.3 mm (0.37 in) D; X90 Pro+: 164.4 mm (6.47 in) H 75.3 mm (2.96 in) W 9.7 mm (0.38 in) D
- Weight: X90: 206 g (7.3 oz); X90 Pro: 214.9 g (7.58 oz); X90 Pro+: 221 g (7.8 oz)
- Operating system: OriginOS 3 (China); Funtouch OS 13 (based on Android 13)
- System-on-chip: X90/X90 Pro: MediaTek Dimensity 9200; X90 Pro+: Qualcomm Snapdragon 8 Gen 2 (4 nm)
- CPU: X90/X90 Pro: Octa-core (1x3.05 GHz Cortex-X2 & 3x2.85 GHz Cortex-A710 & 4x1.80 GHz Cortex-A660); X90 Pro+: Octa-core (1x3.2 GHz Cortex-X3 & 2x2.8 GHz Cortex-A715 & 2x2.8 GHz Cortex-A710 & 3x2.0 GHz Cortex-A510)
- GPU: X90/X90 Pro: ARM Mali-G715-Immortalis; X90 Pro+: Adreno 740
- Modem: MediaTek Dimensity 9200
- Memory: 8 and 12 GB RAM LPDDR5X 8533 Mbps
- Storage: X90: 128, 256 and 512 GB; X90 Pro/X90 Pro+: 256 and 512 UFS 4.0 GB
- Removable storage: None
- SIM: Dual SIM (Nano-SIM, dual stand-by)
- Battery: Li-Po 4810 mAh
- Charging: Fast charging 120W
- Rear camera: X90: 50 MP, f/1.8, (wide), 1/1.49", 1.0µm, PDAF, Laser AF, OIS; 12 MP, f/2.0, 50mm (telephoto), 1/2.93", 1.22µm, PDAF, 2x optical zoom; 12 MP, f/2.0, 16mm (ultrawide), 1/2.93", 1.22µm, AF; 4K@30/60fps, 1080p@30/60fps, gyro-EIS; X90 Pro: 50.3 MP, f/1.8, 23mm (wide), 1.0"-type, 1.6µm, Dual Pixel PDAF, Laser AF, OIS; 50 MP, f/1.6, 50mm (telephoto), 1/2.4", 0.7µm, no AF, 2x optical zoom, OIS; 12 MP, f/2.0, 108˚ (ultrawide), AF; 8K, 4K@30/60fps, 1080p@30/60fps, gyro-EIS; X90 Pro+: 50.3 MP, f/1.8, 23mm (wide), 1.0"-type, 1.6µm, Dual Pixel PDAF, Laser AF, OIS; 64 MP, f/3.5, 90mm (periscope telephoto), 1/2.0", 0.7µm, PDAF, OIS, 3.5x optical zoom; 50 MP, f/1.6, 50mm (telephoto), 1/2.4", 0.7µm, no AF, 2x optical zoom, OIS 48 MP, f/2.2, 14mm, 114˚ (ultrawide), 1/2.0", 0.8µm, AF; 8K@30fps, 4K@30/60fps, 1080p@30/60fps, gyro-EIS, 14-bit RAW video; All: Zeiss optics, Zeiss T* lens coating, Pixel Shift, dual-LED dual-tone flash, HDR, panorama
- Front camera: 32 MP, f/2.5, 24mm (wide), 1/2.8", 0.8µm; 4K@30fps, 1080p@30fps
- Display: 6.78 in (172 mm); 1260 x 2800 px resolution, 20:9 ratio (~453 ppi density); AMOLED, 1B colors, 120Hz, HDR10+
- Sound: Stereo speakers
- Connectivity: Wi-Fi 802.11 a/b/g/n/ac/6, dual-band, Wi-Fi Direct; Bluetooth 5.3, A2DP, LE, aptX HD
- Data inputs: Multi-touch screen; USB-C; Fingerprint scanner (under display, optical); Accelerometer; Gyroscope; Proximity sensor; Compass; Color spectrum

Vivo X90 is a series of Android-based smartphones developed and manufactured by Vivo. They were announced on November 22, 2022. The display also has a ZEISS enhancement and priced the series.

== See also ==
- List of large sensor camera phones
