= Nokia 808 PureView =

Smartphone by Nokia

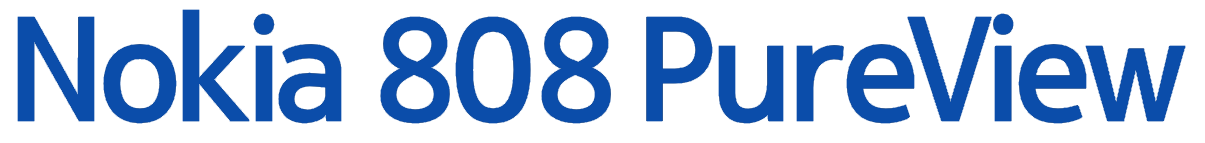

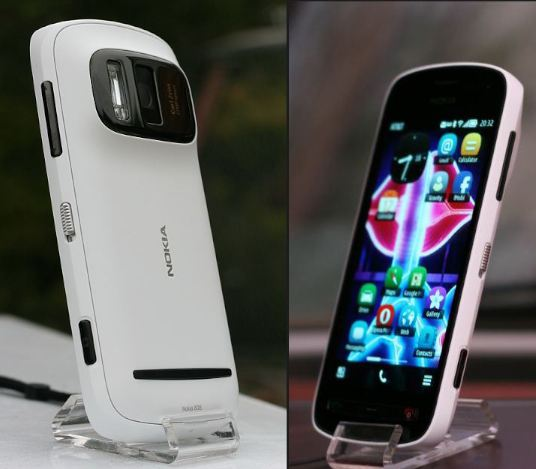
- Manufacturer: Nokia
- Type: Smartphone
- Series: Nokia 3-digit series
- Predecessor: Nokia N86 8MP; Nokia N8
- Successor: Nokia Lumia 1020
- Compatible networks: GSM (850/900/1800/1900 MHz); HSDPA (850/900/1700/1900/2100 MHz)
- Colors: Black, White, Red
- Dimensions: 123.9 mm (4.88 in) H 60.2 mm (2.37 in) W 13.9 mm (0.55 in) D 17.95 mm (0.707 in) Bulge
- Weight: 169 g (6.0 oz)
- Operating system: Nokia Belle Feature Pack 1, upgradeable to Nokia Belle Feature Pack 2
- CPU: ARM11 1.3 GHz Samsung K5W2G1GACT – AP50 processor
- GPU: Broadcom BCM2763 with OpenVG 1.1 and OpenGL ES 2.0 support
- Memory: 512 MB RAM
- Storage: 16 GB
- Removable storage: microSD up to 1 TB supported
- Battery: 1400 mAh Li-ion, removable (Nokia BV-4D)
- Rear camera: 41 MP 1/1.2 in sensor Carl Zeiss optics F-number: f/2.4 ND filter Xenon flash LED light 1080p 30 fps video with continuous autofocus
- Front camera: 0.3 MP; 480p 30 fps
- Display: 4 in (10 cm) AMOLED 2.5D curved nHD display (640x360 pixels); Gorilla Glass with easy-clean coating
- Connectivity: Sensors: Accelerometer; Electronic compass; Proximity sensor; Other: 3.5 mm headphone jack; Bluetooth 3.0; Wi-Fi 802.11 b/g/n, DLNA; GPS with A-GPS; FM radio, Stereo, RDS, FM transmitter; USB 2.0 via MicroUSB port; USB On-The-Go; Micro HDMI port; NFC
- Development status: Discontinued
- Website: Nokia 808 PureView at the Wayback Machine (archived 2012-02-29)

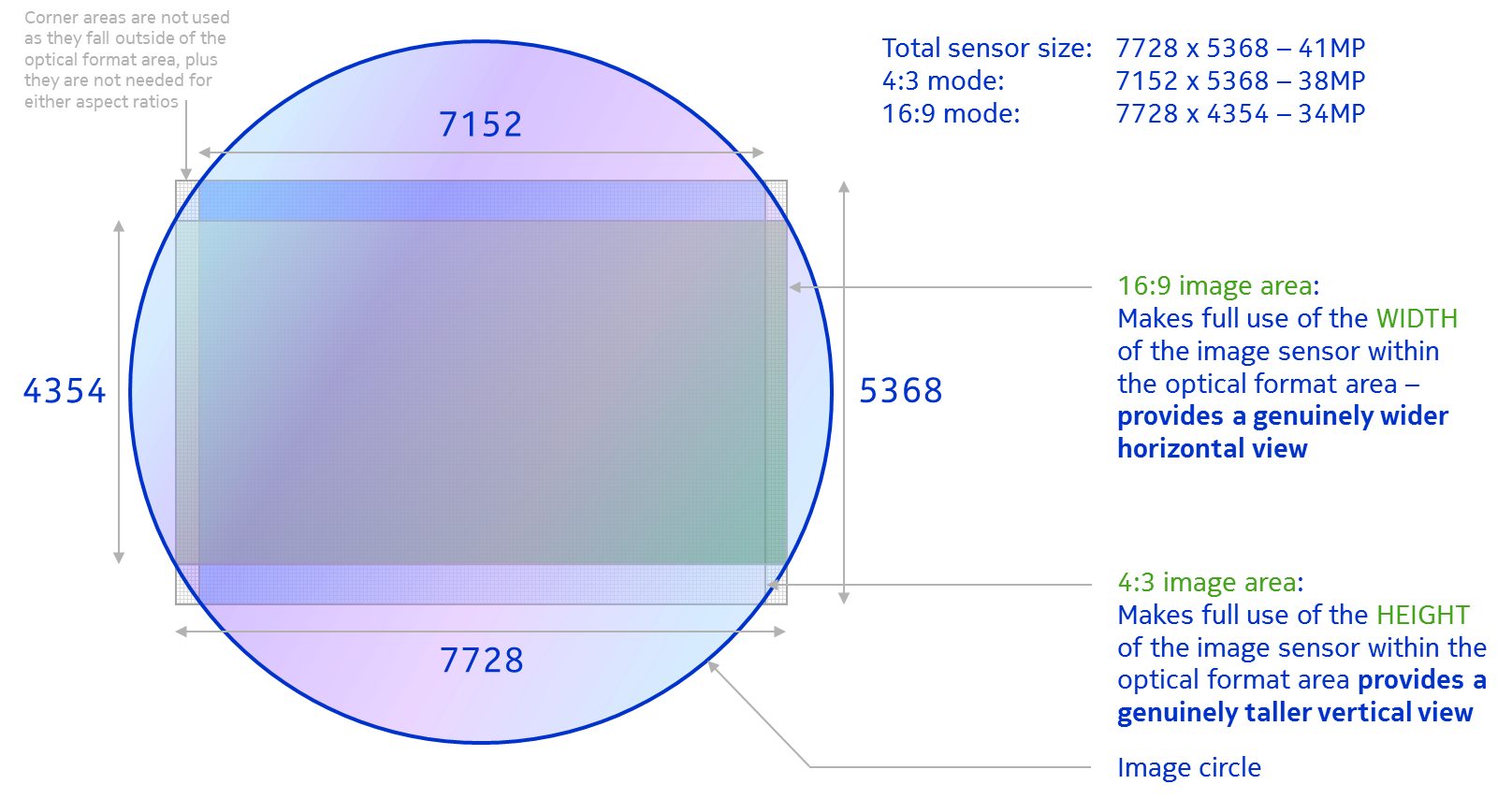
PureView Pro Sensor with image circle and the 16:9 and 4:3 image areas

The Nokia 808 PureView is a Symbian-powered smartphone by Nokia. It was first unveiled on 27 February 2012 at the Mobile World Congress (MWC) and released in May 2012. It is the first smartphone to feature Nokia PureView Pro technology, a pixel oversampling technique that reduces an image taken at full resolution into a lower resolution picture, thus achieving higher definition and light sensitivity, and enables lossless digital zoom. It was one of the most advanced camera phones at the time of its release.

The Nokia 808 PureView features a 41 MP 1/1.2 in (10.67 × 8 mm) sensor and a high-resolution f/2.4 Zeiss all-aspherical 1-group lens. The 808's sensor was the largest (over 4 times larger than typical compact cameras) sensor ever to be used in a cameraphone at the time of its launch, a record previously held by Nokia's N8 and, as of September 2014, by the Panasonic Lumix CM1.

The 808 PureView was the last Symbian smartphone from Nokia. In July 2013, Nokia released the Lumia 1020, a successor running the Windows Phone operating system common to Nokia's newer products.

As of 2024, despite larger 1" sensors and processing, modern phone cameras could not provide resolution better than the Nokia 808 PureView, at least in broad daylight.

== PureView Pro camera ==
PureView Pro is an imaging technology used in the Nokia 808 PureView device. It is the combination of a large 1/1.2 in, very high-resolution 41 MP image sensor with high-performance Carl Zeiss optics. The large sensor enables pixel oversampling, which means the combination of many sensor pixels into one image pixel. PureView imaging technology delivers high image quality, lossless zoom and improved low light performance (see below). It dispenses with the usual scaling/interpolation model of digital zoom commonly used in other smartphones, as well as optical zoom used in most digital cameras, where a series of lens elements moves back and forth to vary the magnification and field of view. In both video and stills, this technique provides greater zoom levels as the output picture size reduces.

=== Image sensor ===
The Nokia 808 PureView has a 41.3 megapixel 1/1.2 in CMOS FSI image sensor with 7728×5368 pixels, built by Toshiba and branded HES9. Pixel size is 1.4 μm; sensor size is 10.67 × 8.00 mm.

Depending on the aspect ratio chosen by the user, the sensor will use a maximum of either 7728×4354 pixels (33.6 MP; full sensor width) for 16:9 images, or 7152×5368 pixels (38.4 MP; full sensor height) for 4:3 images when using the default camera software, although third-party apps exist that can capture the full resolution of the sensor. The output from the sensor is processed using the on-chip image processor, resulting in a lower-resolution final image with a default resolution of 5 MP through pixel binning (oversampling) from the full 34/38 MP image. The image processor highly reduces external processing needs and data rates as well as image noise (see noise shaping). The pixel binning was non-destructive, meaning the user could reframe the image or zoom in after the shot was taken.

==== Zoom ====
Zoom is digital, meaning the image is cropped from a smaller portion of the image sensor, with a corresponding reduction in the level of pixel binning as the zoom is increased. In general, the camera of the Nokia 808 PureView retains a high resolution even when zoomed in, due to the 41 MP sensor. The limit of the zoom is reached when the selected output resolution becomes the same as the input resolution. That means once the area of the sensor reaches 3072×1728 (5 MP for the 16:9 aspect ratio), the zoom limit is reached. At default settings, maximum zoom is 3× for stills and 4× for video (1080p).

The zoom always provides the true image resolution the user wants. The amount of pixel oversampling is highest when zoom is not used. It gradually decreases until the maximum zoom level is reached, where there is no oversampling. At this stage, PureView Pro optics and pixels start behaving in a more conventional way. But because only the centre of the optics is used, the best optical performance is achieved – including low distortion, no vignetting and highest levels of resolved detail. This also means that at full digital zoom, the noise reduction achieved by oversampling (pixel binning) is lost as no oversampling happens at full zoom.

==== Autofocus ====
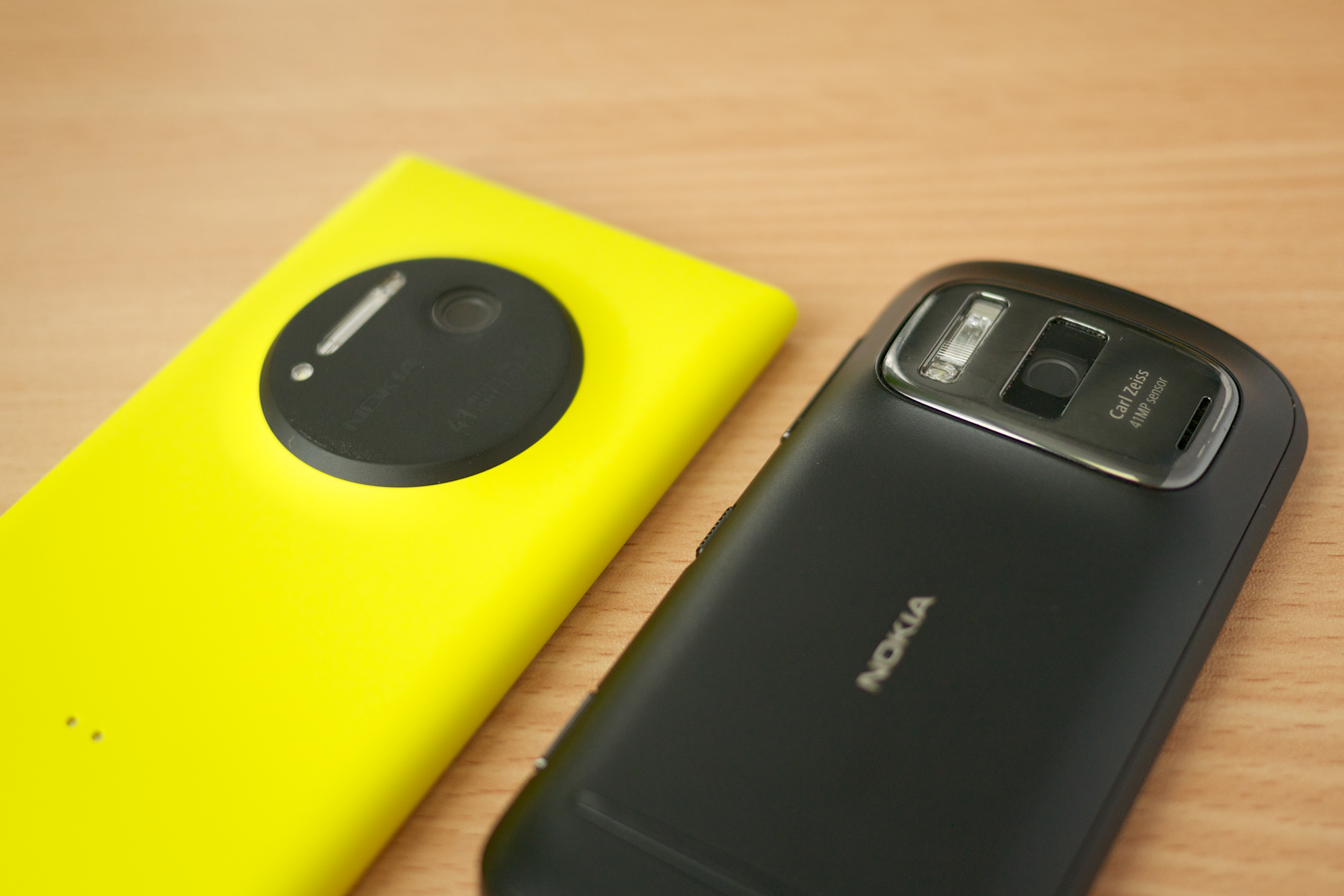
The 808 PureView compared to its successor, Lumia 1020

PureView Pro features continuous autofocus in all shooting modes, close-up (Macro) focus, face detection, touch focus with easy manually selected focus point and hyperfocal distance focus for defined depth of field, for extreme focus speed or when reliably achieving focus is not possible.

==== Video ====
The on-chip oversampling image processor of the 808 PureView enables oversampling of all 38 megapixels even at the high video data rates of 1080p with 30 fps. Maximum possible zoom is 4× for 1080p, 6× for 720p HD and 12× for nHD (640×360) video. In addition, encoding is up to 25 Mbps in 1080p H.264/MPEG-4 HD video format. The PureView Pro sensor integrates a special video processor that handles pixel scaling at up to 1 billion pixels per second before sending the required number to the main image processor.

=== Lens ===
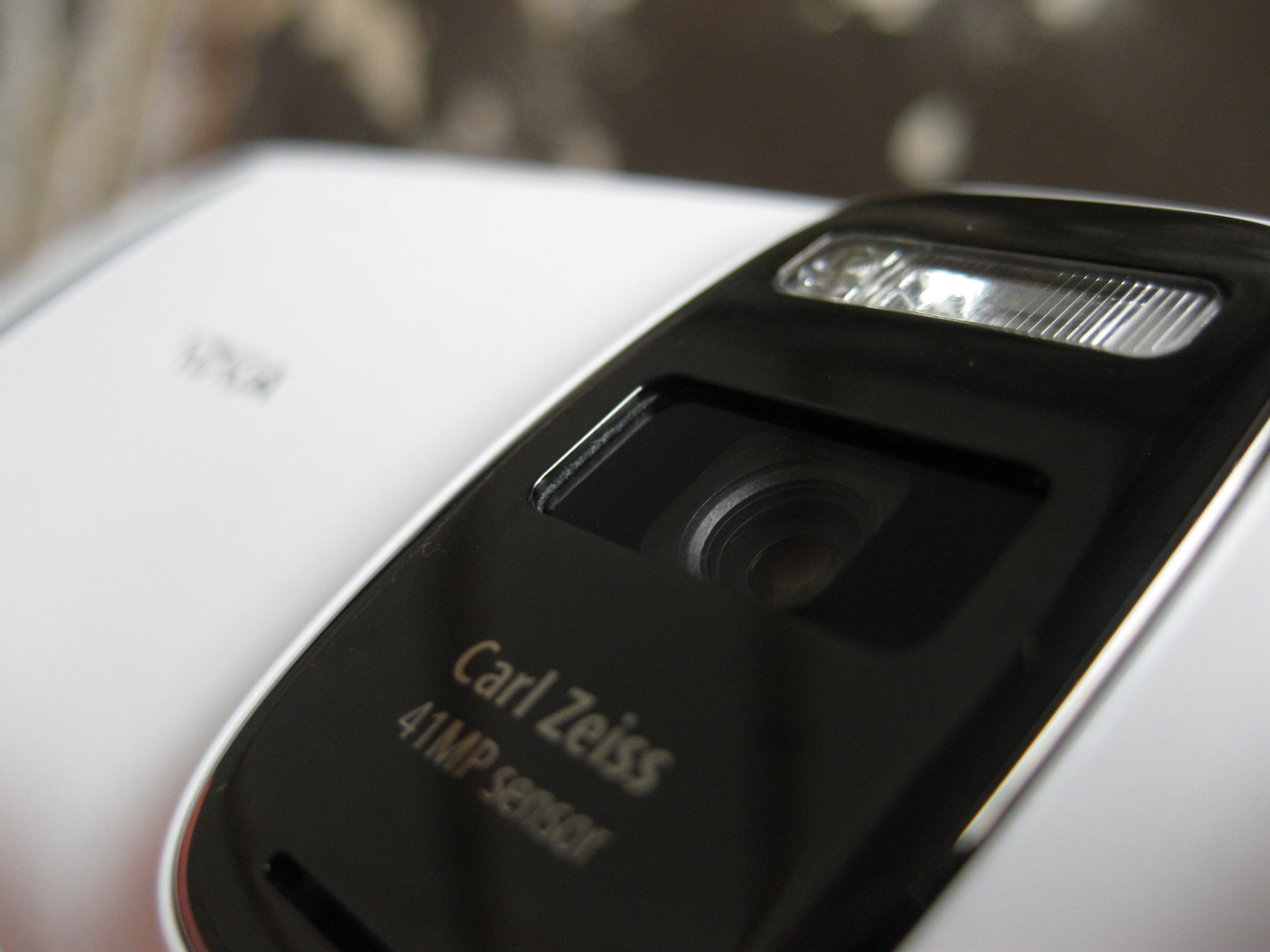
The camera of the 808 has a very large and noticeable hump

The 808 PureView has a Carl Zeiss 5-element lens with an f/2.4 aperture and 8.02 mm focal length (35 mm equivalent focal length is 26 mm in 16:9 and 28 mm in 4:3 aspect ratio). Focus range is from 15 cm to infinity (throughout the zoom range).

The optics are based on a shiftable fixed-focus lens; similar to the prime lenses in most Zeiss Planar or Tessar optics, focus is achieved by varying the distance to the image sensor (unit focusing lens). This construction has the advantage that no movable focus group is needed. Considerable movable (focus-range) lens groups need a minimum of one additional adaptive lens element in both the moved group and the stationary group, increasing the number of elements by at least two. This increases unwanted reflections as well as overall tolerances and therefore decreases sharpness.

The lens consists of only 1 group with molded elements, which gives a highly stable, precise mechanical alignment. The lenses are partly made of plastic, which provides sufficient stability at this size and as a 1-group lens and has the significant advantage of making it possible to use extreme aspheric shaped lens elements.

5 all-aspherical lens elements are used, making it possible to increase border-sharpness and lower distortion and astigmatism. The high–refractive index, low-dispersion glass additionally helps reduce chromatic aberrations. A neutral density filter with approximately ND8 (3 f-stops) is employed for shooting in high light levels where normally a smaller aperture would be set. Although the lens is named a Tessar, it has almost nothing in common with the 4 element in 3 group, non-aspherical original Tessar.

Due to the comparatively large 1/1.2 in sensor and the comparatively fast lens with f/2.4 aperture, the camera has a quite shallow depth of field, equivalent to approximately f/7.8 at 26 mm on 35 mm full-frame.

==== Shutter ====
The 808 PureView has a mechanical shutter with short shutter lag and ND8 (3 f-stops) neutral density filter.

=== Audio ===
The 808 PureView employs Dolby Headphone software to transform stereo content to surround via a 3.5 mm A/V jack. It also includes Dolby Digital Plus software to provide 5.1 surround sound via HDMI or DLNA. The dual software elements from Dolby are embedded into the Nokia Belle feature pack 1 OS.

The 808 PureView is the first device to include the Nokia Rich Recording technology and has a frequency range between 25 Hz to around 19 kHz. The 808 PureView can capture sounds at the loudness level of up to 145 decibels without distortion. The two microphones, located at the top and the bottom enable ambient stereo recording. The audio encoding is done in AAC high profile, 256 kbit/s, 48000 Hz.

== Reception ==
The 808 PureView won the award for "Best New Mobile Handset, Device or Tablet" at Mobile World Congress (MWC) 2012, and the award for Best Imaging Innovation for 2012 from the Technical Image Press Association. It was also given a Gold Award by Digital Photography Review.
