= Xiaomi 15 =

2024 Series of HyperOS-based smartphones

Xiaomi Civi 5 Pro Xiaomi 15 Xiaomi 15 Pro Xiaomi 15 Ultra Xiaomi 15S Pro Xiaomi 15T Xiaomi 15T Pro

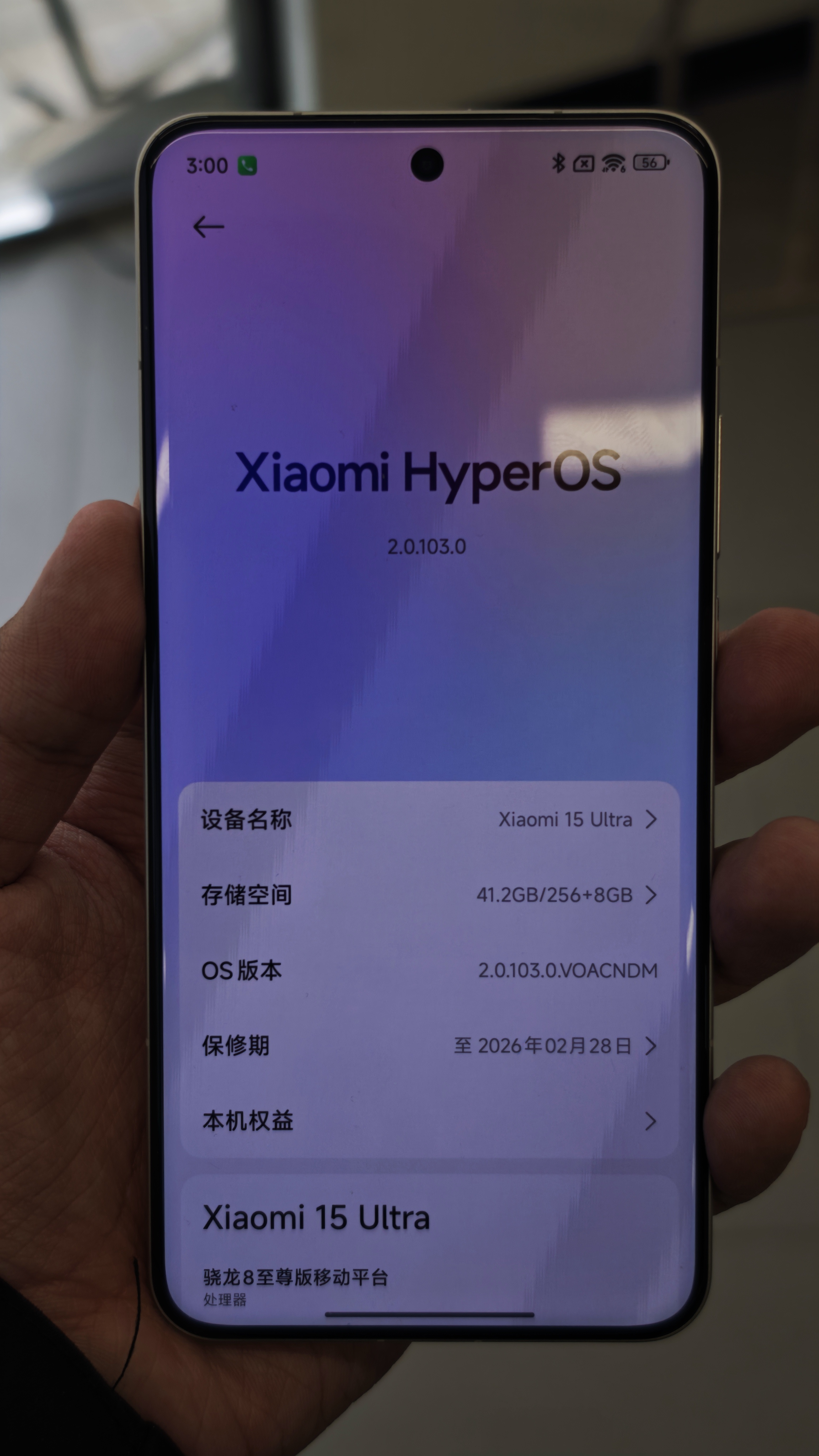
- Xiaomi 15 Ultra
- Manufacturer: Xiaomi
- Type: 15: smartphone 15 Pro/Ultra/S Pro: phablet
- Series: Xiaomi
- First released: 15/Pro: October 29, 2024; 2 years ago 15 Ultra: February 27, 2025; 20 months ago 15S Pro: May 22, 2025; 17 months ago
- Availability by region: 15/Pro: October 31, 2024; 2 years ago in China; 15 Ultra: March 3, 2025; 20 months ago in China; 15S Pro: May 22, 2025; 17 months ago in China
- Predecessor: Xiaomi 14
- Successor: Xiaomi 17
- Form factor: Slate
- Dimensions: 15: 152.3 × 71.2 × 8.08 mm
- Weight: 181 g (6 oz); 213 g (15 Pro/S Pro)
- Operating system: Original: Xiaomi HyperOS 2 (based on Android 15); Current: Xiaomi HyperOS 3 (based on Android 16)
- System-on-chip: 15S Pro: XRING O1; 15/Pro/Ultra: Qualcomm Snapdragon 8 Elite
- CPU: Octa-core (1x 4.32 GHz Prime + 4x Performance + 3x Efficiency)
- GPU: Adreno 830
- Memory: 12 GB / 16 GB LPDDR5X
- Storage: 256 GB / 512 GB / 1 TB; UFS 4.0
- Removable storage: No
- Battery: 15: 5240 mAh; 5400 mAh (China); 15 Pro: 6100 mAh; 15 Ultra: 5410 mAh; 6000 mAh (China)
- Charging: 90W wired, 50W wireless
- Rear camera: 50 MP (Primary, Leica, OIS), 50 MP (Ultra-wide), 50 MP (Telephoto)
- Front camera: 32 MP (OmniVision OV32B40)
- Display: 15: 6.36-inch LTPO AMOLED, 1.5K resolution, 120 Hz refresh rate, 3200 nits peak brightness 15 Pro/Ultra/S Pro: 6.73-inch LTPO AMOLED, 2K resolution, 120 Hz refresh rate, 3200 nits peak brightness
- Sound: Stereo speakers, Dolby Atmos
- Connectivity: 5G, Wi-Fi 7, Bluetooth 6.0, NFC, USB-C
- Model: 15: 24129PN74G, 24129PN74I, 24129PN74C; 15 Pro: 2410DPN6CC; 15 Ultra: 25010PN30G, 25010PN30I, 25019PNF3C (Tiantong satellite), 25010PN30C (Tiantong and Beidou satellites)
- Codename: 15: dada 15 Pro: haotian 15 Ultra: xuanyuan

Xiaomi 15 is a series of Android-based smartphones manufactured by Xiaomi. It succeeds the Xiaomi 14 series and introduces advancements in display technology, camera system, and performance. The devices run on Xiaomi HyperOS 2, based on Android 15, and are powered by the Qualcomm Snapdragon 8 Elite chipset. The Xiaomi 15 and Xiaomi 15 Pro were introduced on October 29, 2024, while the Xiaomi 15 Ultra was introduced on February 27, 2025. The global versions of the Xiaomi 15 and Xiaomi 15 Ultra were announced on March 3, 2025 at MWC and feature eSIM support and smaller batteries compared to the Chinese counterparts.

== Specifications ==
=== Hardware ===
==== Design and display ====
The Xiaomi 15 features a 6.36-inch OLED display with a 1.5K resolution, a 120 Hz refresh rate, and a peak brightness of 3200 nits. The phone is built with an aviation-grade aluminum frame and has a compact design measuring 152.3 × 71.2 × 8.08 mm, weighing 181 g. It is rated IP68 for dust and water resistance, offering durability for daily use.

==== Hardware and performance ====
Powered by the Qualcomm Snapdragon 8 Elite chipset, the Xiaomi 15 line-up is built on a 3 nm process. It includes 8 GB 12 GB or 16 GB of LPDDR5X RAM and offers storage options of 256 GB, 512 GB or 1 TB using UFS 4.0 technology in the base and Pro models and UFS 4.1 technology in the Ultra model. The devices are equipped with an advanced cooling system to manage thermal performance during high-intensity tasks. They support 5G connectivity, Wi-Fi 7, Bluetooth 6.0, NFC, and USB-C.

Xiaomi 15S Pro is equipped with Xiaomi's self-developed 3 nm mobile phone processor chip XRING O1. The chip adopts the second-generation 3 nm advanced process technology, with a chip area of only 109 square millimeters, a transistor count of up to 19 billion, a 16-core GPU, and Immortalis-G925. Its performance ranks among the first echelon of mainstream flagship processors.

==== Camera system ====
Xiaomi collaborated with Leica Camera to enhance the imaging capabilities of the Xiaomi 15 series. The Xiaomi 15 includes a triple-camera system, consisting of a 50 MP primary sensor with optical image stabilization, a 50 MP ultra-wide sensor, and a 50 MP telephoto sensor. The front-facing camera features a 32 MP OmniVision OV32B40 sensor designed for high-resolution selfies and video calls.

Xiaomi 15 camera sensors specs
	Main	Telephoto	Ultra-wide	Front
Sensor	OmniVision OVX9000 Light Fusion 900	Samsung ISOCELL JN5 with 2.6x optical zoom	Samsung ISOCELL JN1	OmniVision OV32B
Sensor Size	1/1.31"	1/2.76"		1/3.14"
Megapixels	50			32
Pixel Size	1.2 μm	0.64 μm		0.7 μm
Focal Length	23 mm equivalent	60 mm equivalent	14 mm equivalent	
Aperture	ƒ/1.6	ƒ/2.76		ƒ/2.0

Xiaomi 15 Ultra camera sensors specs
	Main	Telephoto 1	Telephoto 2	Ultra-wide	Front
Sensor	Sony LYT-900	50MP Sony IMX858 with 3x optical zoom	Samsung ISOCELL HP9 S5KHP9 with 4.3x optical zoom	Samsung ISOCELL JN5 S5KJN5	OmniVision OV32B40
Sensor Size	1"	1/2.51"	1/1.4"	1/2.76"	1/3.14"
Megapixels	50		200	50	32
Pixel Size	1.6-3.2 μm	0.7-1.4 μm	0.56-2.24 μm	0.64-1.128 μm	0.7-1.4 μm
Focal Length	23 mm equivalent	70 mm equivalent	100 mm equivalent	14 mm equivalent	22 mm equivalent
Aperture	ƒ/1.63	f/1.8	ƒ/1.4	ƒ/2.76	ƒ/2.0

==== Battery and charging ====
The Xiaomi 15 series features a silicon-carbon batteries, which has higher energy density compared to the lithium-ion batteries but may degrade faster. That allows manufacturers to include batteries with bigger capacity in smartphones without changing their size.

The battery of the Xiaomi 15 Pro has a capacity of 6100 mAh, while the battery of the Xiaomi 15 has a capacity of 5240 mAh in the global market and 5400 mAh in the Chinese market, and the battery of the Xiaomi 15 Ultra has a capacity of 5410 mAh in the global market and 6000 mAh in the Chinese market.

All three models support 90W wired and 50W wireless charging. They include Xiaomi's proprietary Surge P3 charging chipset and Surge G2 battery management system for optimized power efficiency.

=== Software ===
The Xiaomi 15 series run on Xiaomi HyperOS 2, which is based on Android 15. It includes various optimizations for system fluidity and battery management, while offering deep integration with Xiaomi's ecosystem of devices.
