= Xiaomi 13 =

2022 and 2023 Android-based smartphones manufactured by Xiaomi

Xiaomi 13 Xiaomi 13 Pro Xiaomi 13 Ultra Xiaomi 13 Lite (Xiaomi Civi 2)
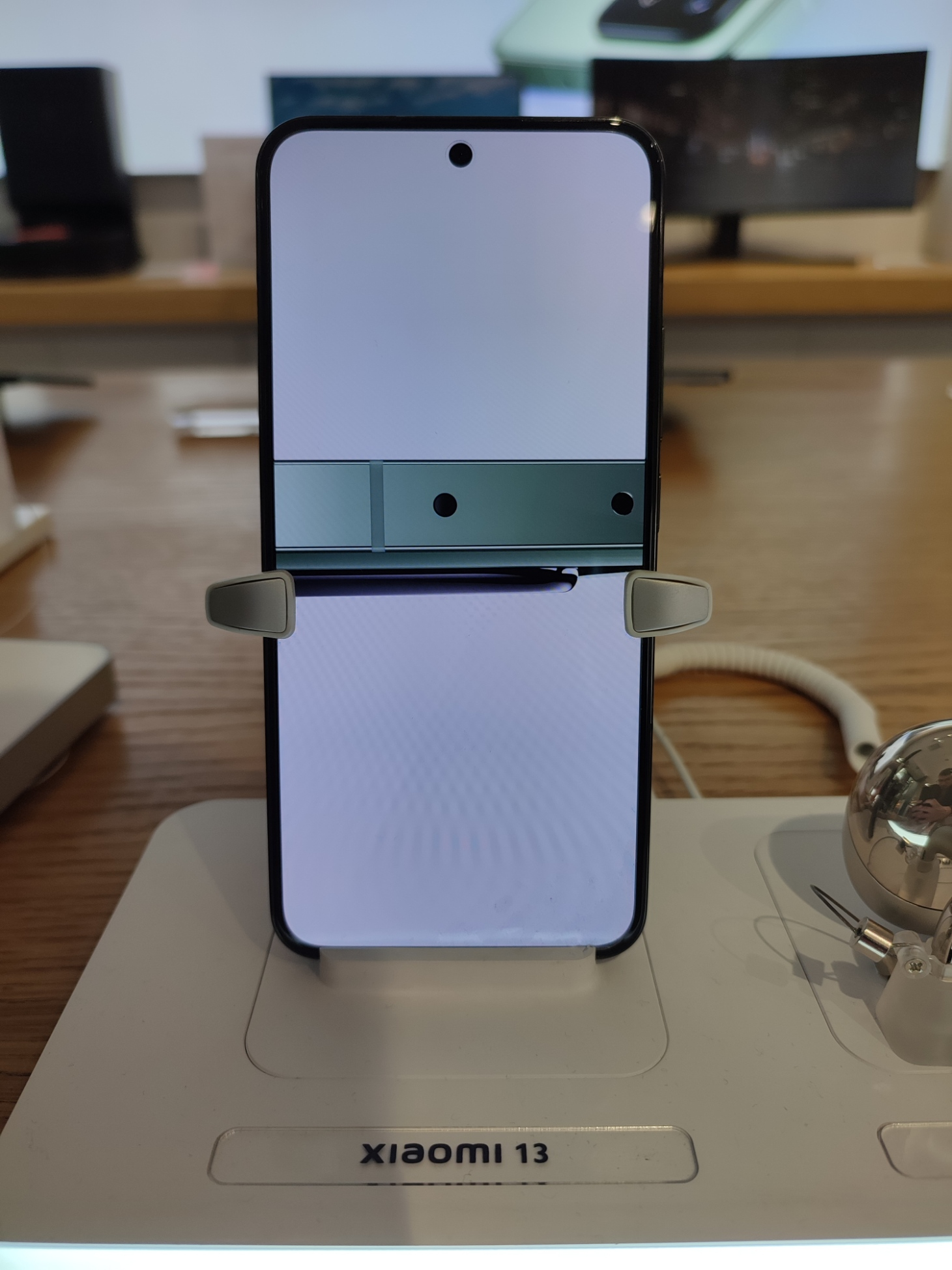
- The front of Xiaomi 13
- Brand: Xiaomi
- Manufacturer: Xiaomi
- Type: 13: Smartphone; 13 Pro: Phablet
- Series: Xiaomi
- First released: 13/13 Pro: December 11, 2022; 3 years ago; 13 Lite: March 8, 2023; 3 years ago
- Availability by region: December 14, 2022; 3 years ago in China
- Predecessor: Xiaomi 12
- Successor: Xiaomi 14
- Related: Xiaomi 12S
- Compatible networks: 2G / 3G / 4G LTE / 5G NR
- Form factor: Slate
- Colors: 13: Black, White, Flora Green, Mountain Blue, Flame Red, Sapphire Blue, Hurricane Yellow, Jungle Green, Cement Grey, Rosy Orange, Ginkgo Yellow, Starry Sky Blue; 13 Pro: Ceramic Black, Ceramic White, Ceramic Flora Green, Mountain Blue; 13 Lite: Black, Lite Blue, Lite Pink
- Dimensions: 13: 152.8 mm (6.02 in) H 71.5 mm (2.81 in) W 7.98 mm (0.314 in) D; 13 Pro: 163 mm (6.4 in) H 74.6 mm (2.94 in) W 8.38 mm (0.330 in) D; 13 Lite: 159.2 mm (6.27 in) H 72.7 mm (2.86 in) W 7.2 mm (0.28 in) D
- Weight: 13: 185 g (6.5 oz); 13 Pro: 210 g (7.4 oz); 13 Lite: 171 g (6.0 oz)
- Operating system: Original: 13/13 Pro: Android 13 with MIUI 14; 13 Lite: Android 12 with MIUI 14; Current: Android 16 with Xiaomi HyperOS 3
- System-on-chip: 13/13 Pro: Qualcomm Snapdragon 8 Gen 2 (4 nm); 13 Lite: Qualcomm Snapdragon 7 Gen 1 (4 nm)
- CPU: 13/13 Pro: Octa-core (1x3.2 GHz Cortex-X3 & 2x2.8 GHz Cortex-A715 & 2x2.8 GHz Cortex-A710 & 3x2.0 GHz Cortex-A510); 13 Lite: Octa-core (1x2.4 GHz Cortex-A710 & 3x2.36 GHz Cortex-A710 & 4x1.8 GHz Cortex-A510)
- GPU: 13/13 Pro: Adreno 740; 13 Lite: Adreno 644
- Memory: 13/13 Pro: 8 and 12 GB RAM; 13 Lite: 8 GB RAM
- Storage: 13/13 Pro: 128, 256 and 512 GB; 13 Lite: 128 and 256 GB
- Removable storage: None
- SIM: Dual SIM (Nano-SIM, dual stand-by)
- Battery: 13/13 Lite: Li-Po 4500 mAh; 13 Pro: Li-Po 4800 mAh
- Charging: 13: Fast charging 67W, PD3.0, QC4; Fast wireless charging 50W; Reverse wireless charging 10W; 13 Pro: Fast charging 120W, PD3.0, QC4; Fast wireless charging 50W; Reverse wireless charging 10W; 13 Lite: Fast charging 67W, PD3.0, QC4
- Rear camera: 13: 50 MP, f/1.9, (wide), 1/1.49", 1.0µm, PDAF, OIS; 10 MP, (telephoto), 1/3.94", 1.0µm, PDAF; 12 MP, f/2.4, (ultrawide), 1/3", 1.12µm; Dual-LED dual-tone flash, HDR, panorama; 13 Pro: 50.3 MP, f/1.9, 23mm (wide), 1.0"-type, 1.6µm, Dual Pixel PDAF, Laser AF, OIS; 50 MP, (telephoto), 1/2.76", 0.64µm, PDAF, 3.2x optical zoom; 50 MP, f/2.2, (ultrawide), 1/2.76", 0.64µm, PDAF; Leica lens, Dual-LED dual-tone flash, HDR, panorama; 13 Lite: 50 MP, f/1.8, 23mm (wide), 1/1.56", 1.0µm, PDAF; 8 MP, f/2.2, 119˚ (ultrawide), 1/4.0", 1.12µm; 2 MP, f/2.4, (macro); Dual-LED dual-tone flash, HDR, panorama; All: 8K@24fps (HDR), 4K@30/60fps (HDR10+), 1080p@30/120/240/960fps, 720p@1920fps, gyro-EIS
- Front camera: 13/13 Pro: 32 MP, f/2.5, 26mm (wide), 0.7µm; HDR, panorama; 13 Lite: 32 MP, f/2.4, 100˚ (ultrawide), 1/2.74", 0.8µm; 8 MP, f/2.3, (depth); Dual-LED flash, HDR; All: 1080p@30/60fps, 720p@120fps, HDR
- Display: 13: 6.36 in (162 mm), 2400 x 1080 px resolution, 20:9 ratio (~414 ppi density); 13 Pro: 6.73 in (171 mm), 3200 x 1440 px resolution, 20:9 ratio (~521 ppi density); 13 Lite: 6.55 in (166 mm), 2400 x 1080 px resolution, 20:9 ratio (~402 ppi density); All: AMOLED, 68B colors, 120Hz refresh rate, Dolby Vision, HDR10+, 1100 nits (peak), Corning Gorilla Glass Victus
- Sound: Stereo speakers
- Connectivity: Wi-Fi 802.11 a/b/g/n/ac/6 or 6e (market dependent), dual-band, Wi-Fi Direct; Bluetooth 5.2, A2DP, LE
- Data inputs: Multi-touch screen; USB Type-C 2.0; Fingerprint scanner (under display, optical); Accelerometer; Gyroscope; Compass; Color spectrum; Proximity sensor
- Website: www.mi.com/global/product/xiaomi-13/; www.mi.com/global/product/xiaomi-13-pro/; www.mi.com/global/product/xiaomi-13-lite/

The Xiaomi 13 is a flagship Android smartphone from Chinese electronics company Xiaomi, released in December 2022. It is part of the Xiaomi 13 series, which also includes the Xiaomi 13 Pro and Xiaomi 13 Lite. The device features premium build quality, advanced camera systems, and top-tier performance, catering to consumers who prioritize high-end specifications in a flagship phone.

== Specifications ==
=== Design and Display ===
The Xiaomi 13 features a sleek, modern design with a glass back or silicone polymer and aluminum frame. It is available in various colors, including Black, White, and Floral Green. The front houses a 6.36-inch AMOLED display, which offers a Full HD+ resolution (2400×1080 pixels), with a 120 Hz refresh rate for smooth scrolling and gaming. The screen supports HDR10+ and Dolby Vision, offering vibrant colors and deep contrasts, making it ideal for multimedia consumption. The back of the Xiaomi 13 is made of a silicone polymer material in the Blue color option and glass in all other color options. Limited edition color options: Starry Sky Blue, Cabernet Orange, and Ginkgo Yellow are also made with a silicone polymer material.

=== Performance ===
Powered by the Qualcomm Snapdragon 8 Gen 2 chipset, the Xiaomi 13 provides top-tier performance in terms of processing power and energy efficiency. The phone features 8 or 12 GB of RAM, paired with 128, 256, or 512 GB of UFS 4.0 storage. This hardware combination ensures smooth multitasking, fast app launches, and excellent gaming performance.

The Xiaomi 13 runs on MIUI 14, based on Android 13, offering a customizable interface, enhanced privacy features, and improved system optimizations.

=== Camera System ===
The Xiaomi 13 stands out with its triple-camera setup developed in collaboration with Leica, a renowned German camera brand. The main camera system includes:

- 50 MP (f/1.8) main sensor with optical image stabilization (OIS)
- 10 MP (f/2.0) telephoto sensor with 3.2x optical zoom
- 12 MP (f/2.2) ultrawide sensor with a 120° field of view

The cameras are capable of shooting 8K video at 24fps and 4K video at up to 60fps, offering impressive video capabilities for content creators. The Leica branding also brings enhanced color accuracy and an improved bokeh effect for portraits.

The front camera is a 32 MP sensor, which delivers high-resolution selfies.

=== Battery and Charging ===
The Xiaomi 13 comes with a 4,500 mAh battery, supporting 67W wired fast charging, which can fully charge the device in around 38 minutes. The phone also supports 50W wireless charging, allowing for quick top-ups without the need for cables, and 10W reverse wireless charging to charge other devices.

=== Connectivity ===
The Xiaomi 13 offers 5G connectivity, ensuring fast data speeds on supported networks. It also includes Wi-Fi 6, Bluetooth 5.3, NFC, and USB Type-C. The device does not have a 3.5 mm headphone jack, in line with current smartphone trends favoring wireless audio solutions.

== Price and Availability ==
Upon launch, the Xiaomi 13 was priced competitively, offering premium flagship specifications at a relatively lower price compared to other high-end smartphones from brands like Apple and Samsung. The device is available in various global markets, including China, India, and select European countries.

== Reception ==
The Xiaomi 13 received generally positive reviews from critics and users alike. Reviewers praised its build quality, display quality, and the performance of the camera system. The device was particularly noted for its Leica collaboration, which improved the overall photography experience. However, some critics mentioned that the MIUI software could be a bit heavy for certain users, with occasional bugs and updates being a common point of feedback.

== Variants ==
Xiaomi 13 Pro: A more premium variant of the Xiaomi 13, with a larger display, more advanced camera system (including a 1-inch sensor), and additional features.

Xiaomi 13 Lite: A lighter, more affordable version of the 13 series, featuring a less powerful chipset and a simplified camera setup.
