= List of highways numbered 420 =

Route 420 or Highway 420 may refer to:

== Australia ==
- Bass Highway (Victoria)
- South Gippsland Freeway
- South Gippsland Highway
- Bass Highway
- Phillip Island Road

== Canada ==
- Ontario Highway 420
- New Brunswick Route 420
- Newfoundland and Labrador Route 420

== Ireland ==
- R420 road

== Japan ==
- Japan National Route 420

== Norway ==
- Norwegian County Road 420

== Spain ==
- N-420

== United Kingdom ==
- A420 road (Bristol to Oxford)

== United States ==
- Interstate 420 (two unbuilt freeways)
- U.S. Route 420
- Florida State Road 420 (former)
- County Road 420 (Orange County, Florida)
- Louisiana Highway 420
- Indiana State Road 420 (now Interstate 94).
- New Mexico State Road 420
- New York State Route 420
- Ohio State Route 420
- Pennsylvania Route 420
- Puerto Rico Highway 420
- South Carolina Highway 420
- Tennessee State Route 420
- Farm to Market Road 420
- Virginia State Route 420
- Kentucky State Route 420

Preceded by 419	Lists of highways 420	Succeeded by 421
