= Heiðin há =

Shield volcano on Hellisheiði, Iceland

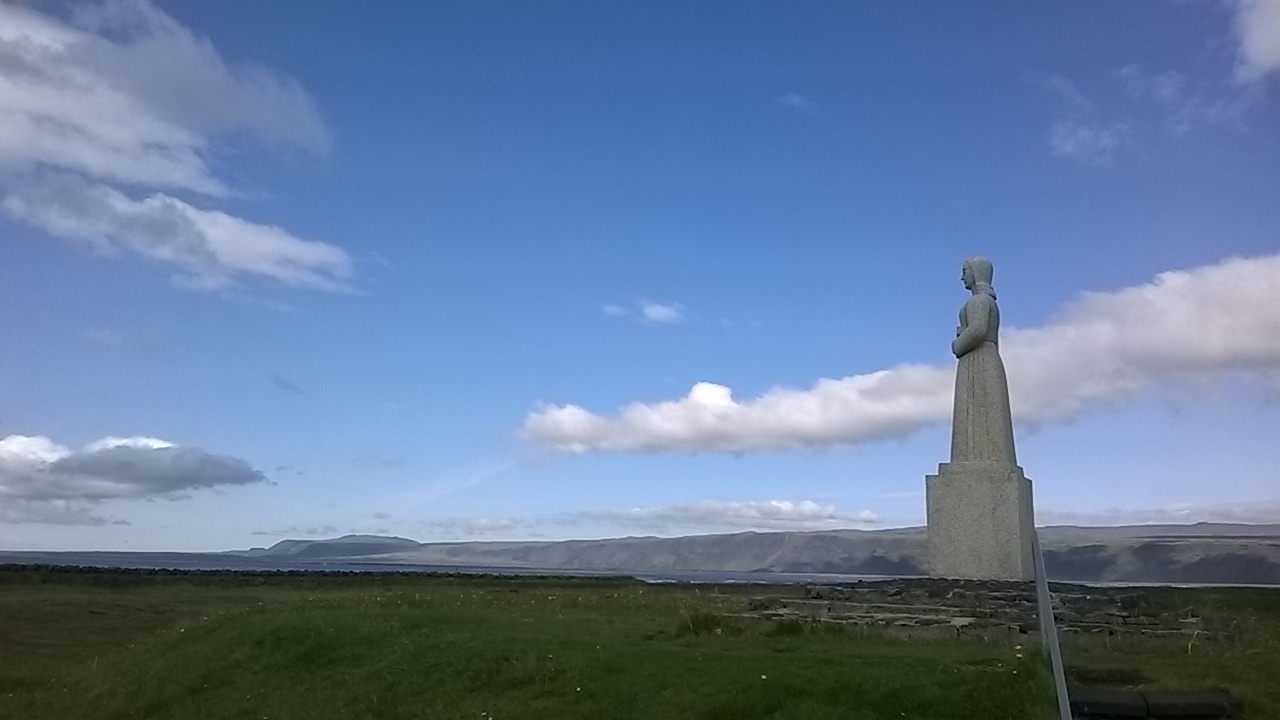
- Heiðin há, seen from the statue Landsýn near Strandarkirkja in Selvogur

Highest point
- Elevation: 626 m (2,054 ft)(Björn Hróarsson: Hellahandbókin. Leiðsögn um 77 íslenska hraunhella. Reykjavík 2008, p. 103)
- Coordinates: 63°56′00″N 21°39′00″W

Naming
- English translation: High Moorland
- Language of name: Icelandic

Geography
- Location within Iceland
- Location: Iceland

Geology
- Rock age: Holocene
- Mountain type: Shield volcano
- Last eruption: Holocene

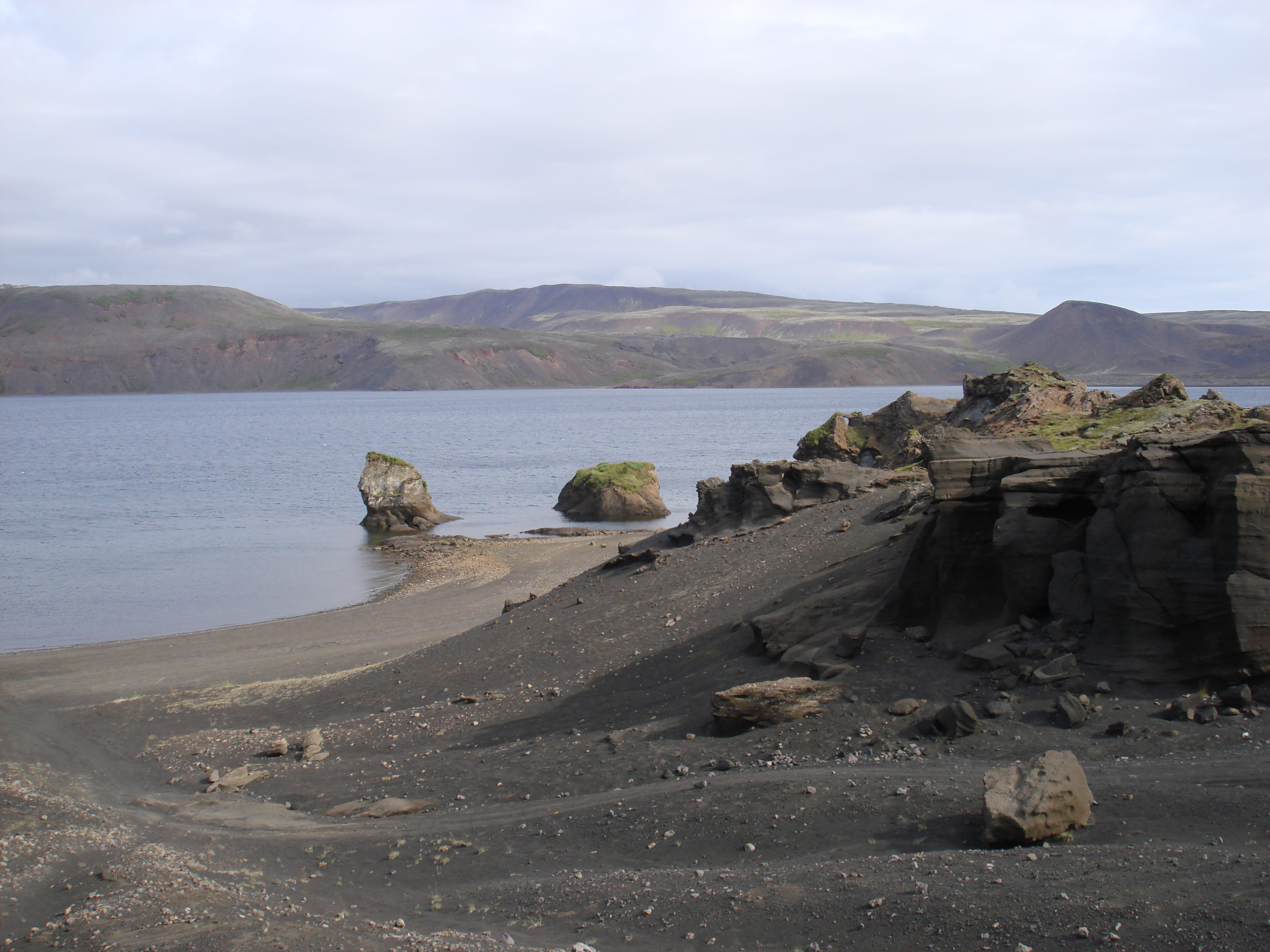
Heiðin há from lake Kleifarvatn

Heiðin há (Icelandic pronunciation: [ˈheiːðɪn ˈhauː]) is a shield volcano up on Hellisheiði at about 35 km to the south of Reykjavík in Iceland. The mountain has a height of 626 m.

== Shield volcano ==
The volcano dates from the Mid-Holocene, is - following B. Hróarsson - about 6,000 years old, slightly younger than the Selvogsheiði, another shield volcano on Reykjanes peninsula, whereas Sinton defines its age as “finiglacial”, i.e., from the beginning of Holocene.

It covers about 160km2, and its volume is about 10km3. The volcano is part of the Brennisteinsfjöll volcanic system.

The top crater is located south of Bláfjöll. It has a diameter of ca. 400m, but is mostly filled by lava up to the rim.

The lava flows from Heiðin há went in all directions on Hellisheiði: They covered the highland up to the Bláfjöll and up to the tuya Geitafell [ˈceiːtaˌfɛtl̥] in eastern direction, and enclosed the older shield volcano Selvogsheiði [ˈsɛlˌvɔksˌheiːðɪ] as well as the mountain Urðarfell [ˈʏrðarˌfɛtl̥].

== Lava tubes of Heiðin há ==
Some lava tubes were discovered in the lava of Heiðin há. Speleologists esp. describe Kuluhattshellar [ˈkʰʏːlʏˌhahtsˌhɛtlar̥] ("Bowler Hat Caves") and Fosshellir [ˈfɔsːˌhɛtlɪr̥]. The first lava tube is rather eroded, but shows anyway some fine lava stalactites, whereas the second one prides a lava fall as the name says (= "Water/Lava fall cave").

== Slopes of Heiðin há ==
The slopes of the shield volcano are cut by small canyons, including Strandagjá [ˈstrantaˌcauː], Hrossagjá [ˈr̥ɔsːaˌcauː], Réttargjá [ˈrjɛhtarˌcauː] and Götugjá [ˈkœːtʏˌcauː].

== Selvogsgata – an old trail ==
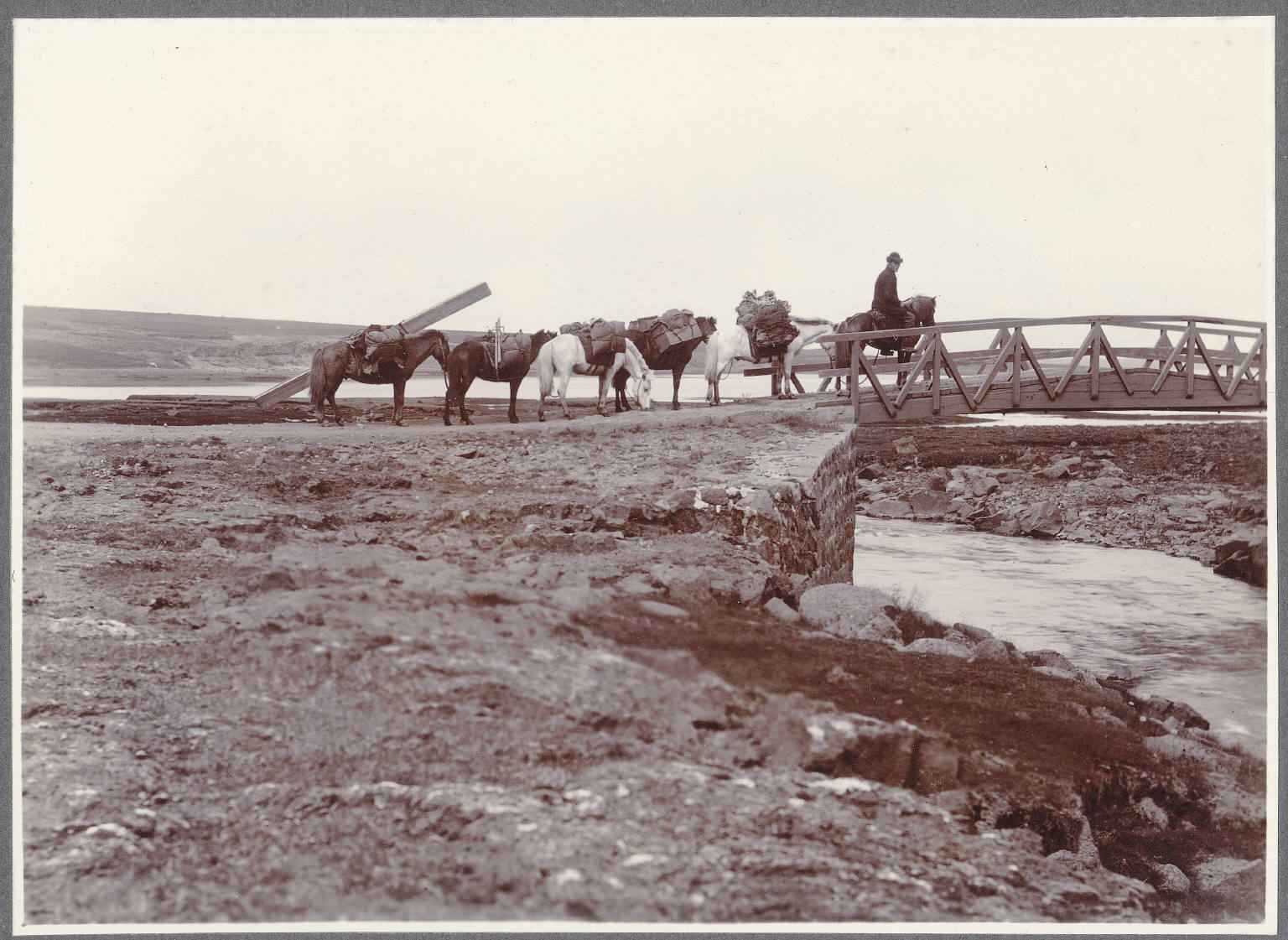
An Icelandic pack train around 1900

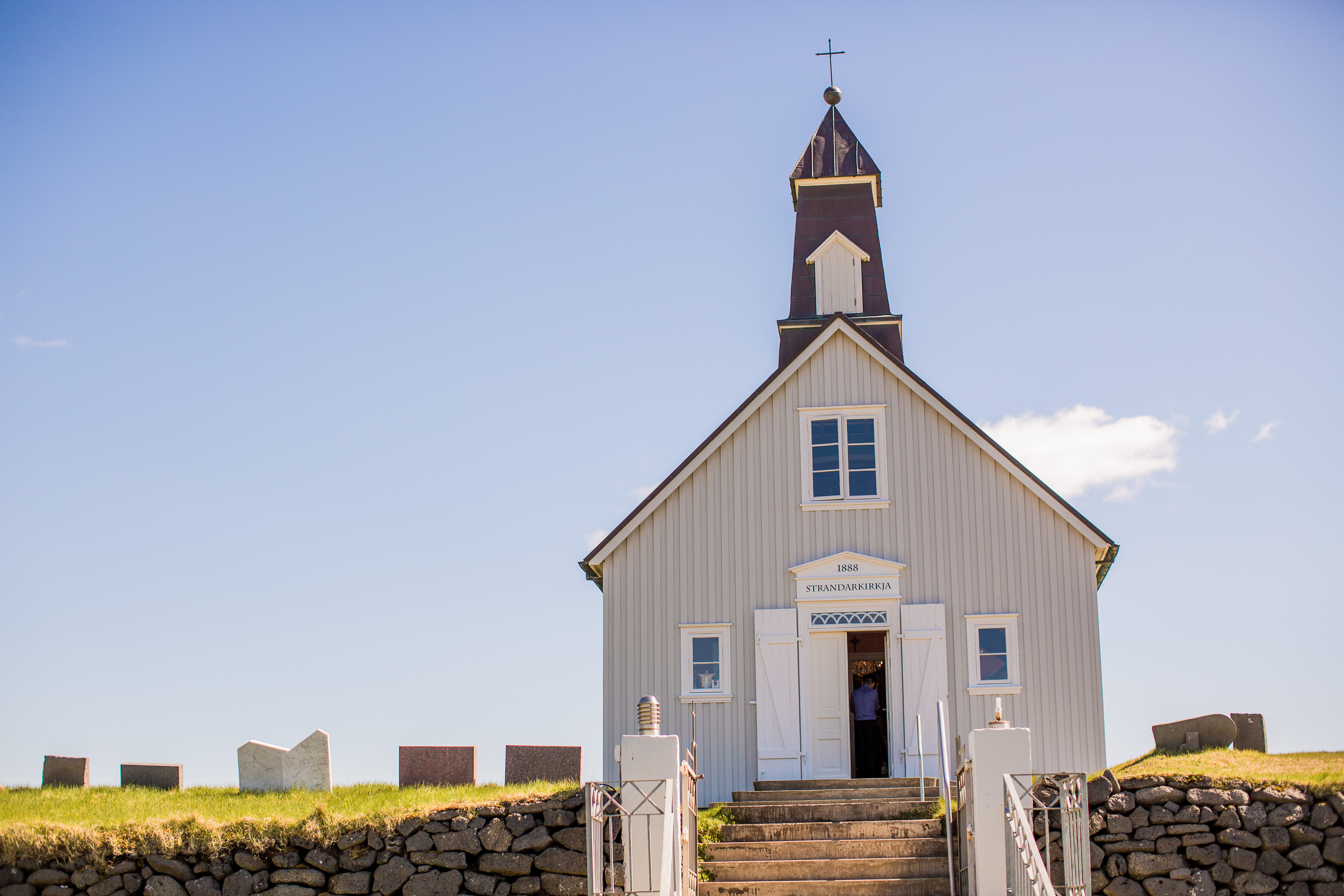
Strandarkirkja

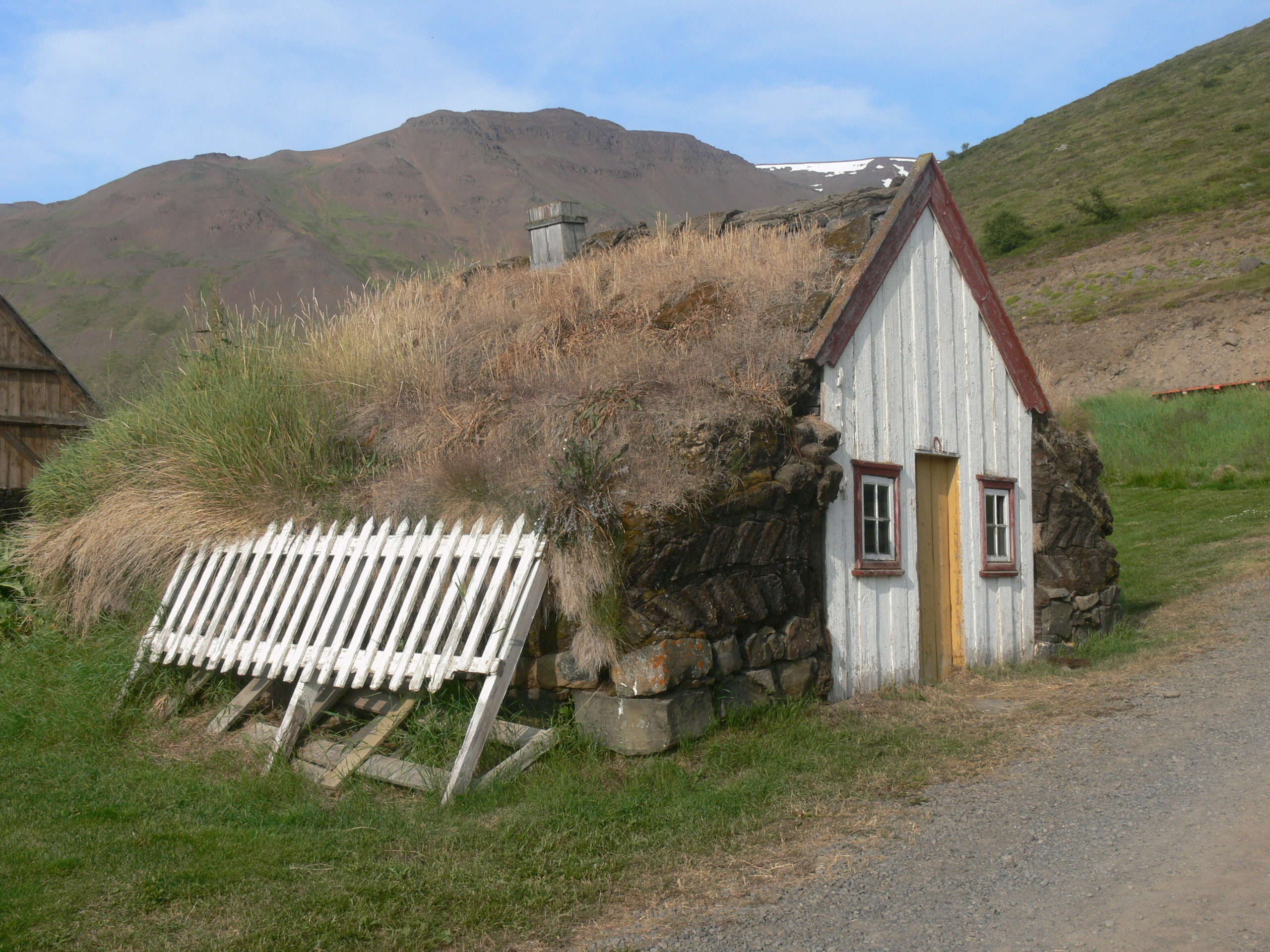
An Icelandic turf house

The trail leads from the farms near the Selvogur bay (Árnessýsla) on the south coast of Reykjanes up to Hafnarfjörður in the vicinity of Reykjavík. In such, it traverses the Reykjanes peninsula from south to north at a length of about 25 km.

=== Importance of the trail ===
This old trail, Selvogsgata, traverses a big part of the slopes of the shield volcano Heiðin há.

It was used by people on foot or on horseback traveling to the market place in Hafnarfjörður. As such the trail was used until around 1930 with pack horses, and on foot until around 1960. Around 1939, the farms in the Selvogur area had a road installed that they could use for the whole year round. Last were sheep brought over Selvogsgata to Hafnarfjörður in the end of the 1940s at the beginning of winter. It took the farmers about 14 hours to get with their herd from Selvogur to the market town, with snowfall parts of the way.

=== Beginning of the trail: Strandarkirkja ===
The trail begins near Strandarkirkja, a church on the southern coast of Reykjanes west of Þorlákshöfn.

The church Strandarkirkja is made of timber, was constructed around the turn of the 19th century and renovated in the 1960s. It is said that seamen in distress built the church after their rescue in fulfilling a vow. Though this is a Lutheran church, pilgrimages are organized still today, and votiv offerings can be seen in the church.

=== The trail over Hellisheidi and Heiðin há ===
The trail is not marked, but discernable except in the winter. After about 1 km up the hill slope, one reaches the area of Heiðin há. Here, the trail lies over Katlahraun [ˈkʰahtlaˌr̥œyːn] lava field, one of the lava flows produced by the shield volcano. This lava reaches into the valley Hlíðardalur [ˈl̥iːðarˌtaːlʏr̥] and from there up on Hvalskarð [ˈkʰvalˌskarθ]. Some moorland is here to be found where in former times the people from Selvogur took the turf for fire making and the construction of their Icelandic turf houses.

The small pass Hvalskarð is also feasible on horseback. From some heights in the vicinity, Iceland's south coast is visible. According to a fólktale, a troll woman from up here had stolen a whale carcass from the beach down in Selvogur. But the farmer who was the proprietor of the beach, and therefore of the whale, followed her and got her at Hvalskarð (hence the name: Whale pass).

After the pass, the trail continues to Kóngsfell [ˈkʰouŋsˌfɛtl̥], from there to Grindarskörð [ˈkrɪntarˌskœrθ], and then down in the direction of the lava fields between the Brennisteinsfjöll and Hafnarfjörður, where it is possible to choose between some other trails.

Today the trail crosses Route 417 at the foot of Grindarskörð.

=== Hiking trail ===
This trail is today a popular hiking trail. and leads just from/up to a parking lot at Route 417 near Grindarskörð.
