= Vífilsfell =

Mountain in Iceland

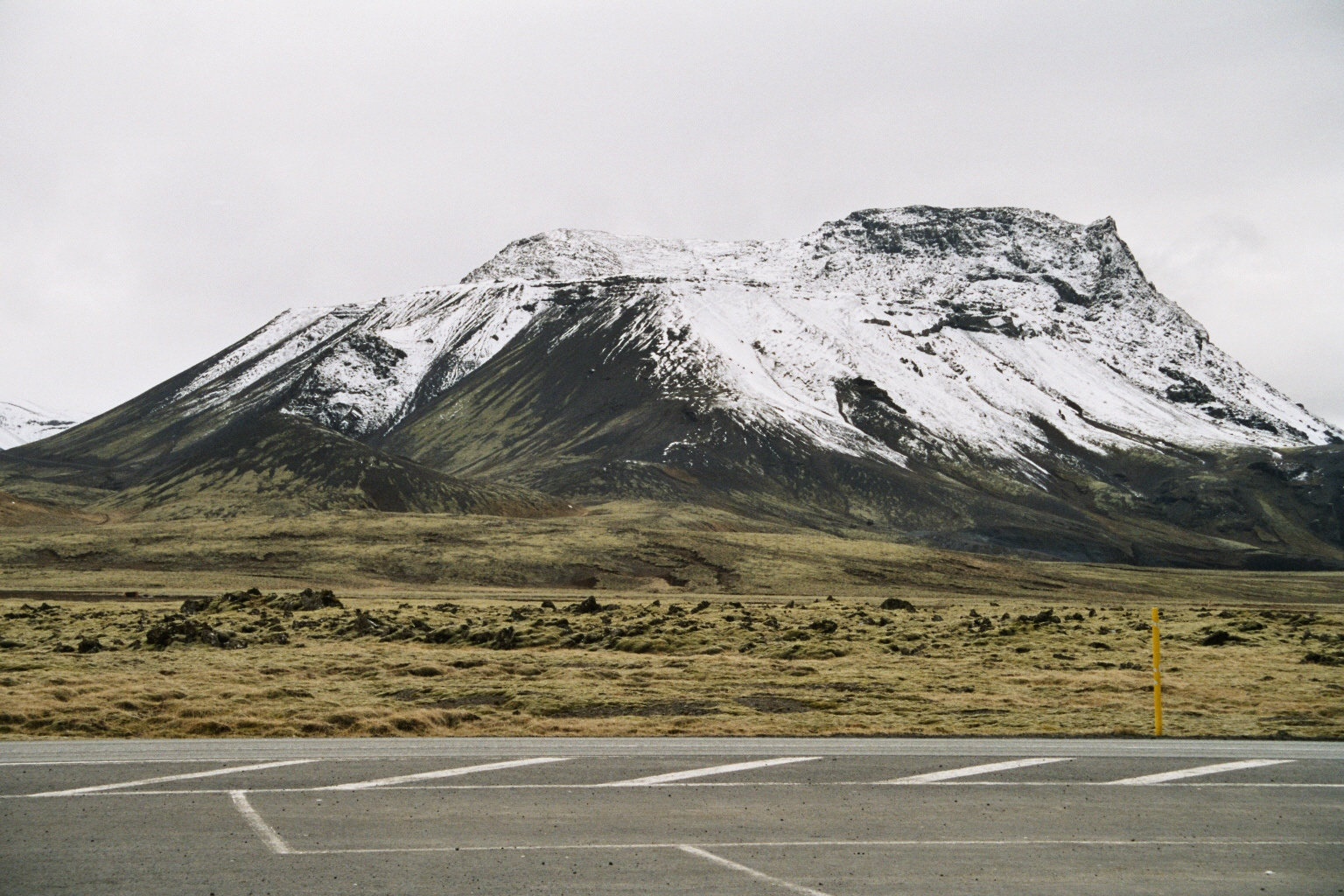
- Vífilsfell, seen from the parking lot at Litla Kaffistofan in 2004, in between the lava field Svínahraun

Highest point
- Elevation: 655 m (2,149 ft)(Íslandshandbókin. Náttúra, saga og sérkenni. Reykjavík 1989, p. 834)
- Prominence: 400–450 m (1,310–1,480 ft)(Snæbjörn Guðmundsson, Vegvísir um Jardfræði Íslands. Reykjavík 2015, p.50)
- Coordinates: 64°02′18″N 21°33′19″W

Naming
- English translation: Mountain of Vífill
- Language of name: Icelandic

Geography
- Location within Iceland
- Location: Iceland
- Parent range: Bláfjöll

Geology
- Rock age: Pleistocene (Weichselian)
- Mountain type: Subglacial mound
- Last eruption: Pleistocene (Weichselian)

Climbing
- Easiest route: from the ridge between Jósepsdalur and the Hringvegur

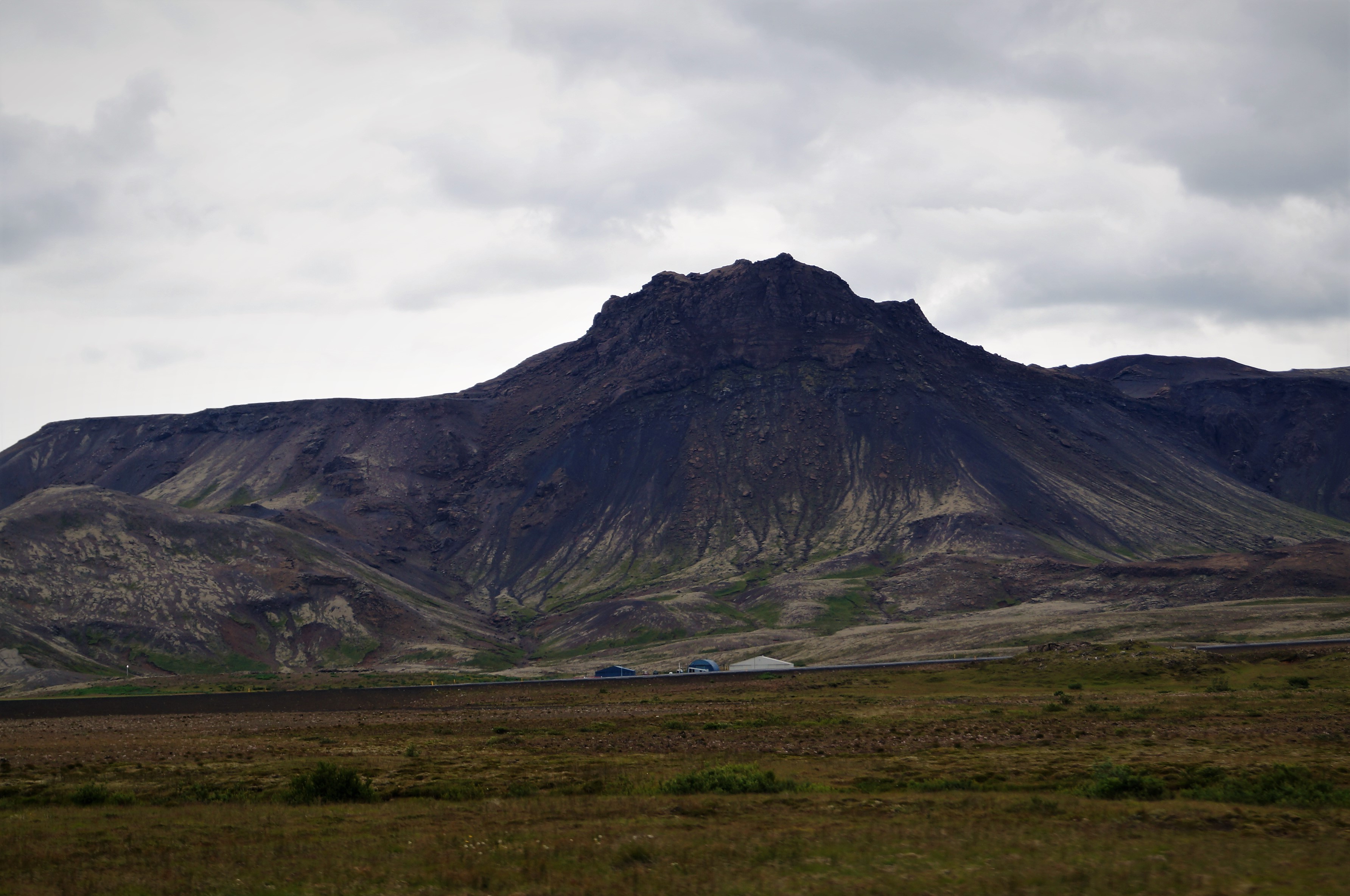
View on Sandskeið airfield and Vífilsfell from the Hringvegur

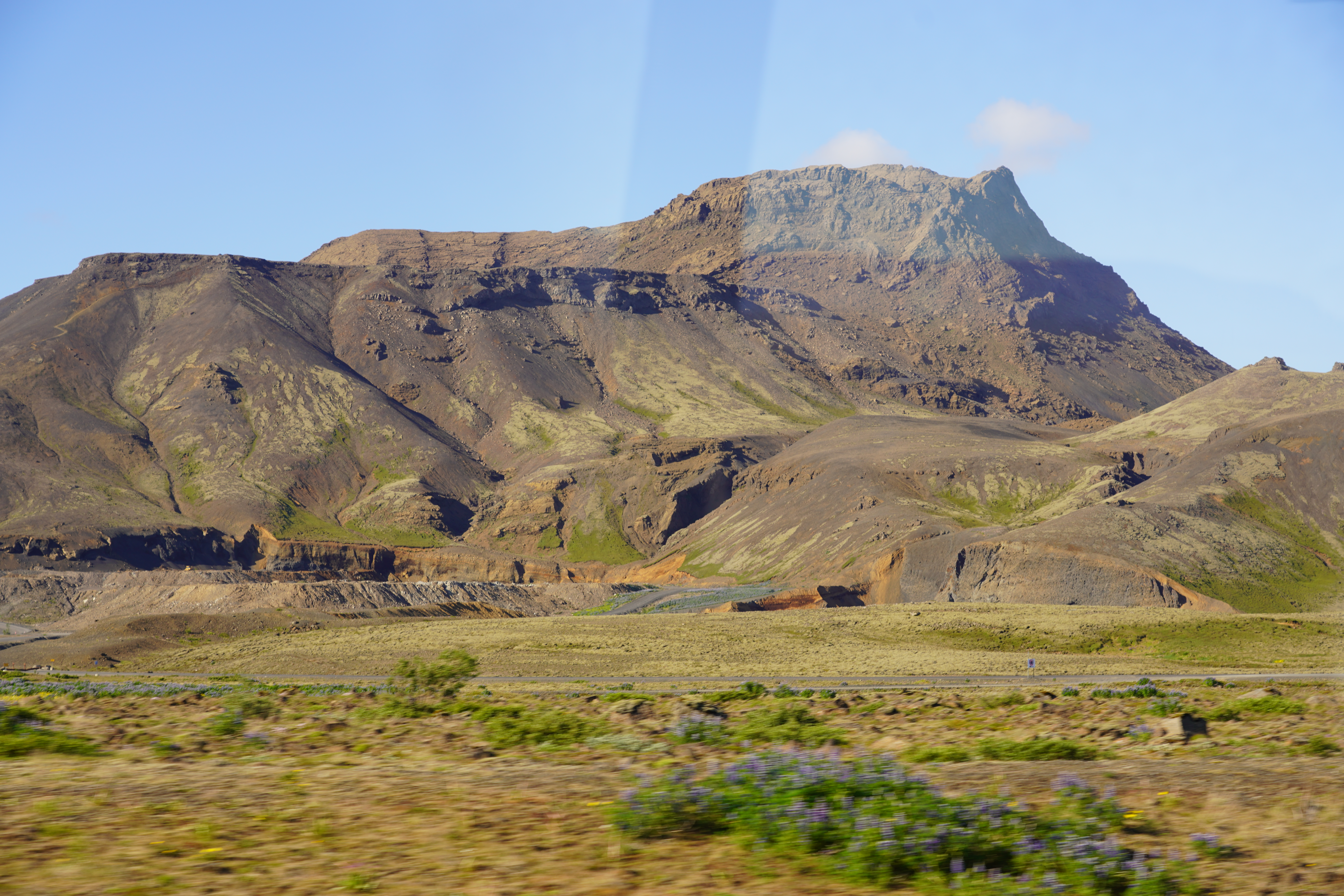
Quarries at Vífilsfell in 2019

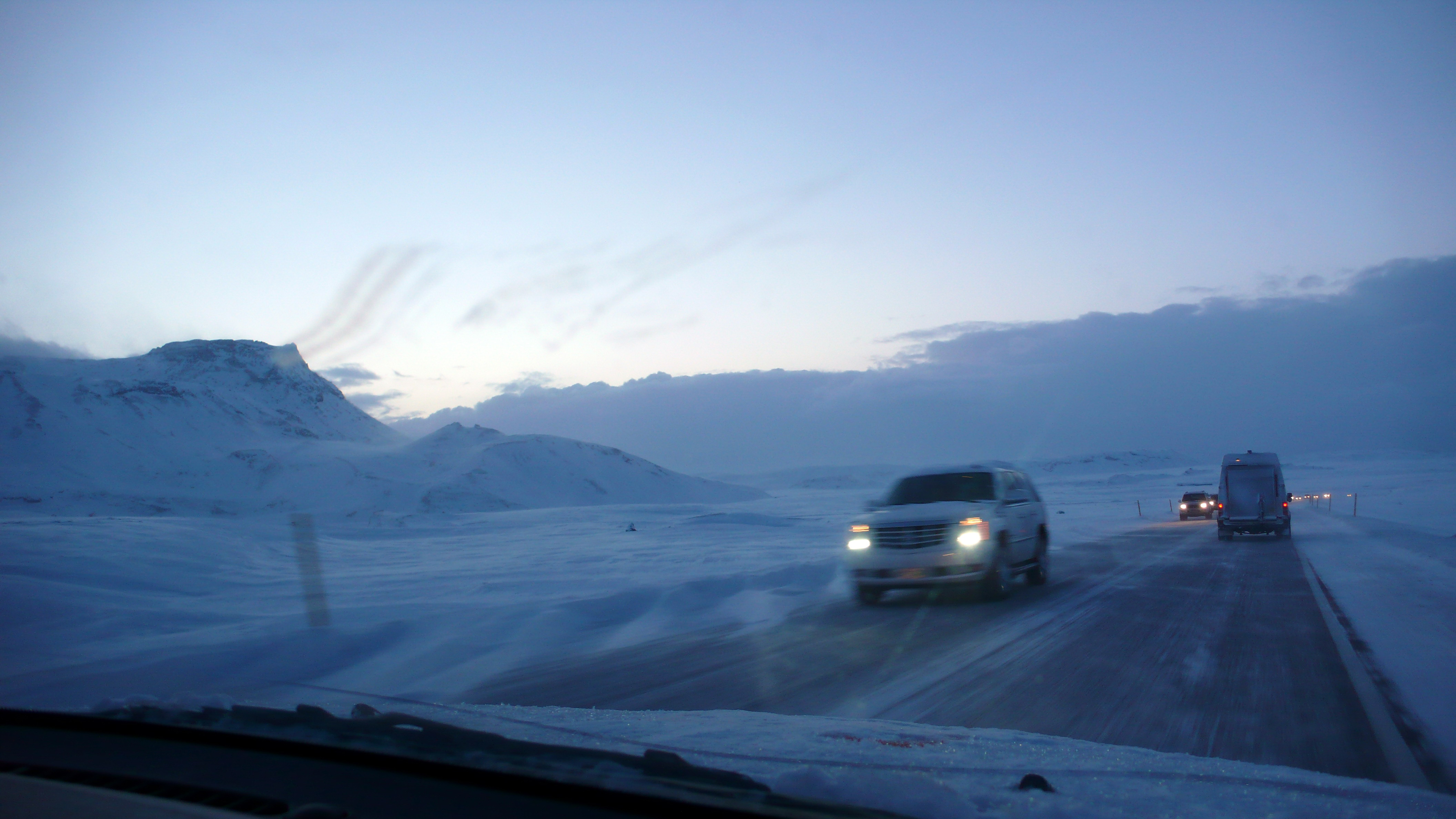
Winterly road conditions on the Hringvegur near Vífilsfell

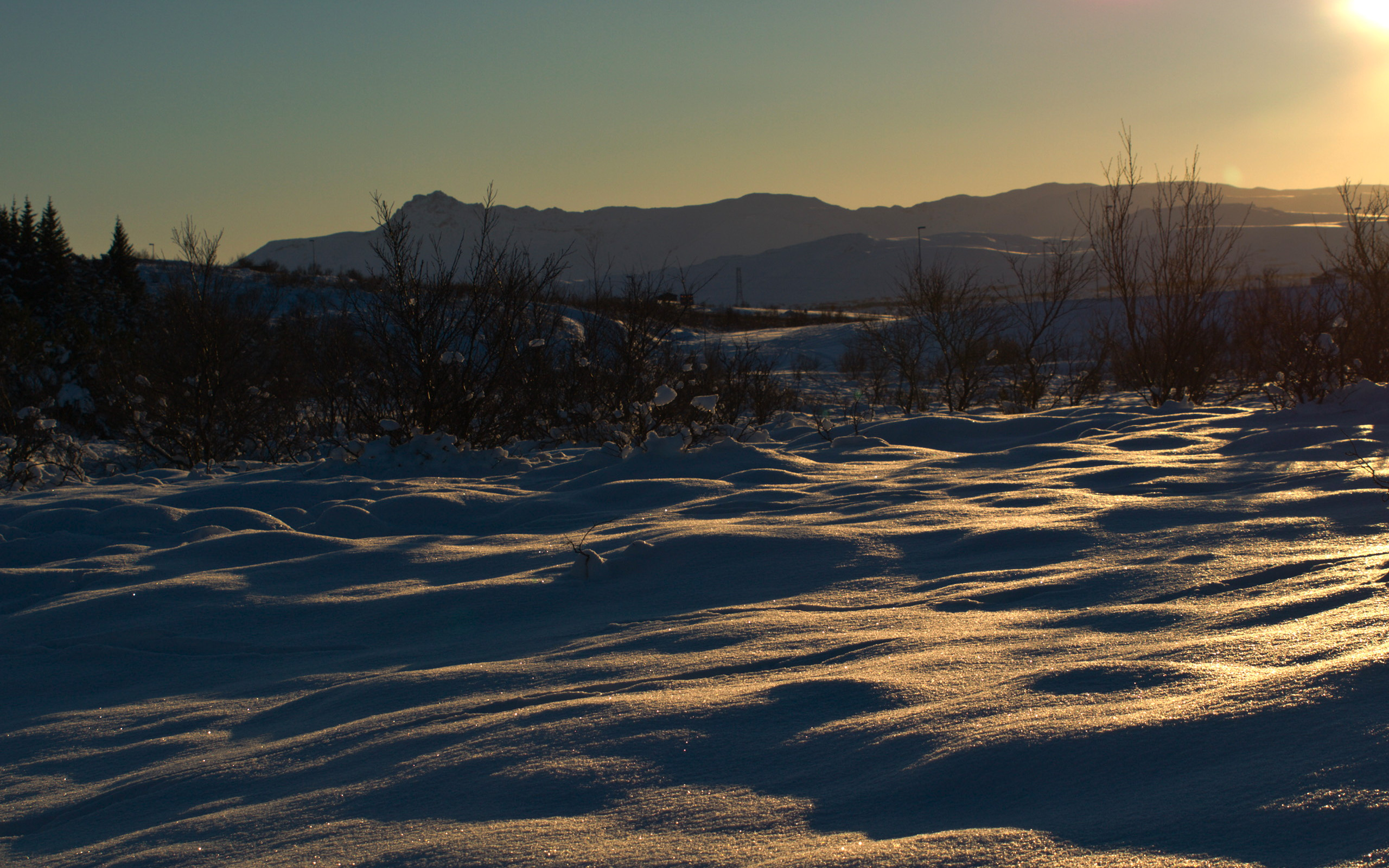
Bláfjöll with Vífilsfell to the left, seen from lake Rauðavatn in the outskirts of Reykjavík

Vífilsfell (Icelandic pronunciation: [ˈviːvɪlsˌfɛtl̥]) is a hyaloclastite ridge in southwestern Iceland (Weichselian). It is 655 m high and located west of Jósepsdalur valley on the volcanic plateau of Hellisheiði. It forms the northernmost offset of the Bláfjöll mountain massif and is situated on top of the fissure system of Brennisteinsfjöll.

== Name ==
The name comes from one of the freed slaves of Iceland's first settler Ingólfur Arnarson. The man, called Vífill, is said to have had his own farm at Vífilsstaðir, now in the vicinity of the city of Hafnarfjörður. From there – according to the Landnámabók – he went daily up to the top of Vífilsfell, some 20 km away, to look after the weather. When the weather seemed promising, he went fishing from the tip of the Seltjarnarnes peninsula near Grótta.

== Geography ==
Vífilsfell is part of a 10 km long mountain massif, the Bláfjöll, which are directed northeast to southwest. This corresponds well with the other mountain ranges and fissure systems of the region, the Reykjanes peninsula in Southwest Iceland. The subglacial mound even builds an escarpment reaching out the north, where mostly older lava fields are to be found, whereas to the south, younger ʻaʻā lavas form a landscape characterized by cragged ridges and fissures, with only some smoother pāhoehoe in between.

== Geology ==
=== Volcano Vífilsfell ===
The subglacial mound dates from the last Pleistocene glaciation (Weichselian). It has its origin in two or perhaps more subglacial eruptions, the uppermost layer at the summit being a hyaloclastic (tuff) rock. (Ari Trausti Gudmundsson, 2004), whereas other scientists talk about the small plateau under the summit where the uppermost layers as basalt lavas.

"Vífilsfell directly overlies" a tuya, called "Northern Bláfjöll" by Hamilton "and encompasses a conical mound of palagonite with isolated welded scoria, volcanic bombs, dikes with pillowed surfaces, and peripheral slump deposit". (C.W.Hamilton, 2004)

=== Volcanic edifices in the vicinity ===
Topography and stratigraphy of the region around Vífilsfell reveal different features of subaerial as well as subglacial volcanism:

- Northern Bláfjöll, ie. the northernmost truncated spur of the Bláfjöll mountain massif, is a flat-topped tuya, "emerged from a deep englacial melt-water lake" (Hamilton, 2003).
- The subglacial mound Vífilsfell itself is situated directly on top of this tuya. On the other hand, Vífilsfell was built up under a thinner glacier than the tuya, perhaps just 0–45 m thick. This can be concluded from the water content of the rocks which is 0.08-0.24wt% at Boluöldur.
- Another volcanic landform in the vicinity, Arnarþúfur, is built up of a series of conical mounds, nevertheless being not a product of a subglacial fissure eruption, but an accumulation of various glacial and volcanic products such as glacial deposits (eskers), deposits of pyroclastic flows, turbidites and a hyaloclastic flow deposit. The latter is defined by Hamilton as "mobilized volcanoclastic glass originating from melt-water interaction".

=== Holocene volcanism and connection to the history of Iceland ===
The eruption history of the region does not end in the Pleistocene. Holocene lava fields surround Vífilsfell. They are eruption products of two volcanic systems, the Hengill system to the northwest and the Brennisteinsfjöll system. The last eruptions in the Hengill system took place about 2000 years ago, but the youngest lava field, the Svínahraunsbruni (Brennisteinsfjöll volcanic system) dates from the year 1000 and was also called Kristnitökuhraun, because at the time of the eruption, the Icelandic vikings had a dispute in Þingvellir about the question, if they should become Christians, to which, in the end, they acquiesced.

== Quarries ==
Some quarries are to be found at the western flank of Vífilsfell. In 2010, it was planned to extract around 2-5 000 000m3 in the quarry of Bóluöldur.

When scientists examined the outcrops in the quarry, they found many layers of pillow lavas. One theory about their origin is, that during the last stages of Vífilsfell's eruptions, subaerial lavas had emerged up on the mountain, degassed there and then run into a deep lake or the sea.

== Roads and airfield ==
The Hringvegur (Suðurlandsvegur) passes by at a distance of about 5 km from Vífilsfell. The mountain can be seen very well from the coffee shop Litla Kaffistofan. Road 417 (Bláfjallavegurinn) passes by the foot of the mountain and continues to the ski resort of Bláfjöll.

The small airport of Sandskeið, where esp. gliders are starting and landing, is also located to the west of the mountain.
