= List of highways numbered 419 =

The following highways are numbered 419:

== Canada ==
- Manitoba Provincial Road 419
- Newfoundland and Labrador Route 419

== India ==
- National Highway 419 (India)

== Japan ==
- Route 419 (Japan)

== Philippines ==
- N419_highway_(Philippines)

== United States ==
- Florida:
  - Florida State Road 419
    - County Road 419 (Seminole County, Florida)
  - County Road 419 (Osceola County, Florida)
- Georgia State Route 419 (unsigned designation for Interstate 985)
- New York State Route 419
  - New York State Route 419 (former)
- Pennsylvania Route 419
- Puerto Rico Highway 419
- South Carolina Highway 419
- Virginia State Route 419

Preceded by 418	Lists of highways 419	Succeeded by 420
