= Bláfjöll =

Mountain range of Iceland

Coordinates: 63.974°N 21.639°W

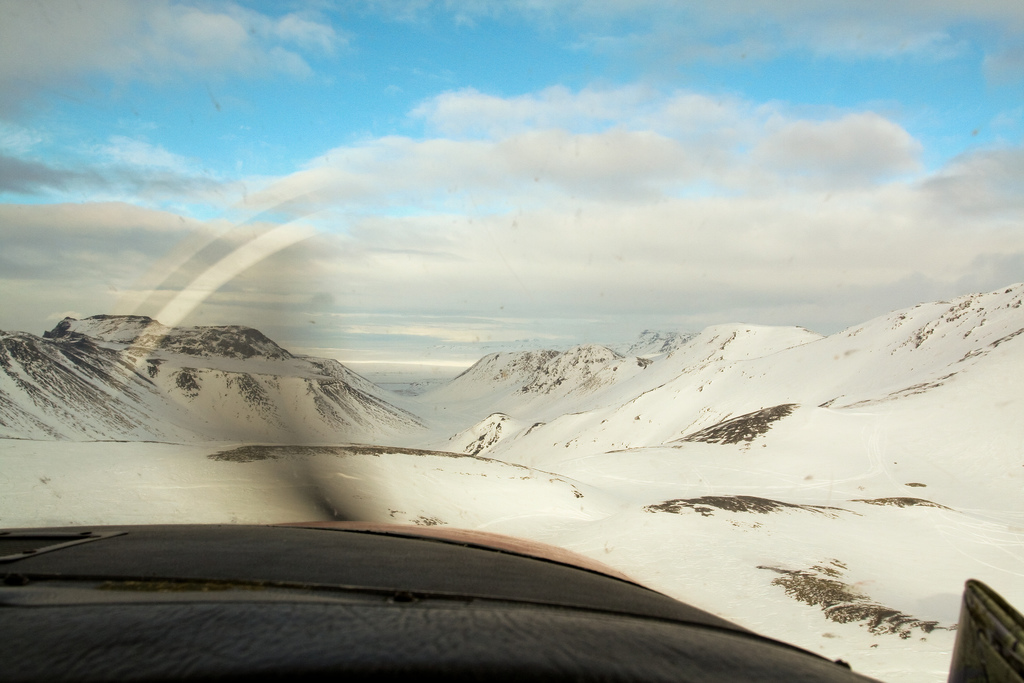
Bláfjöll

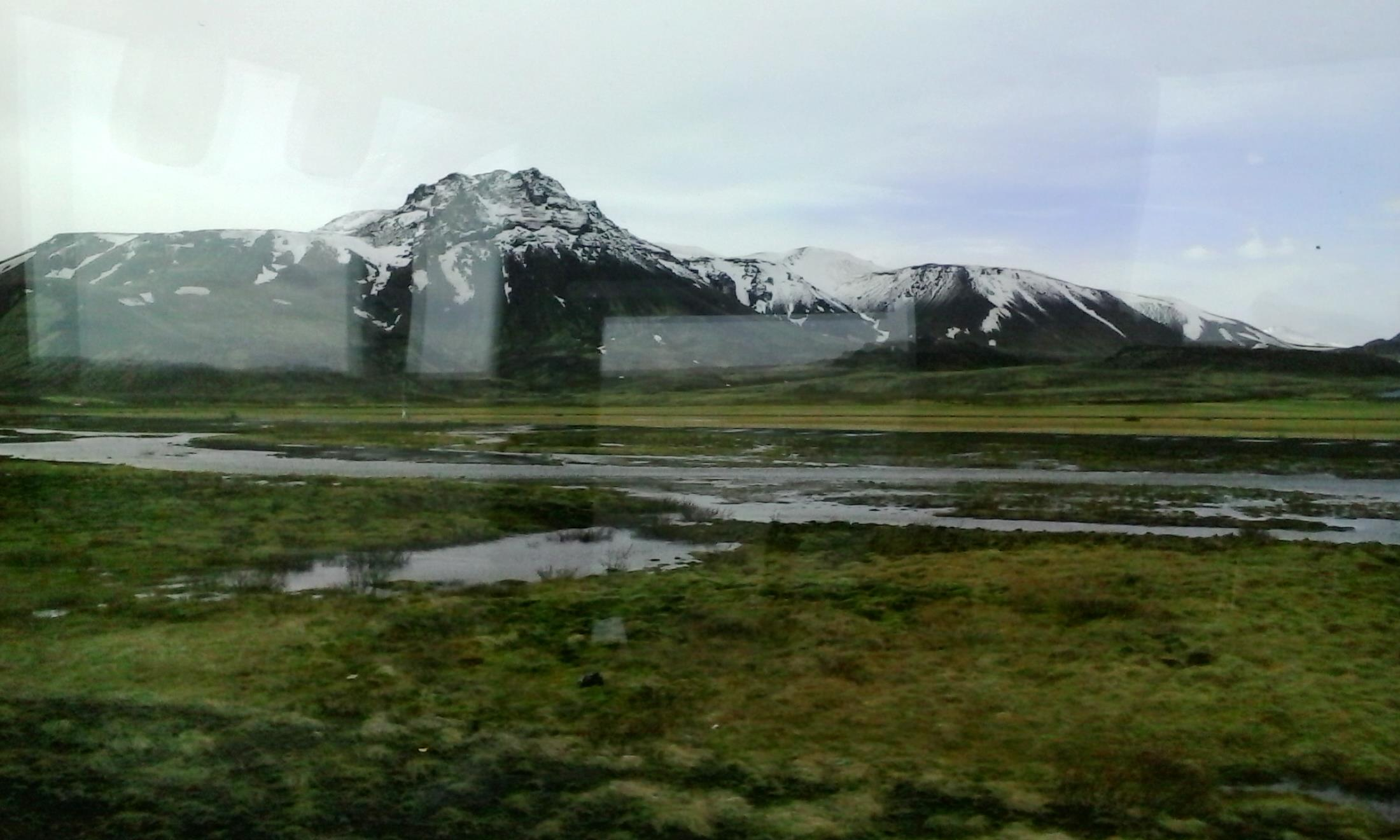
Vífilsfell and the northern Bláfjöll

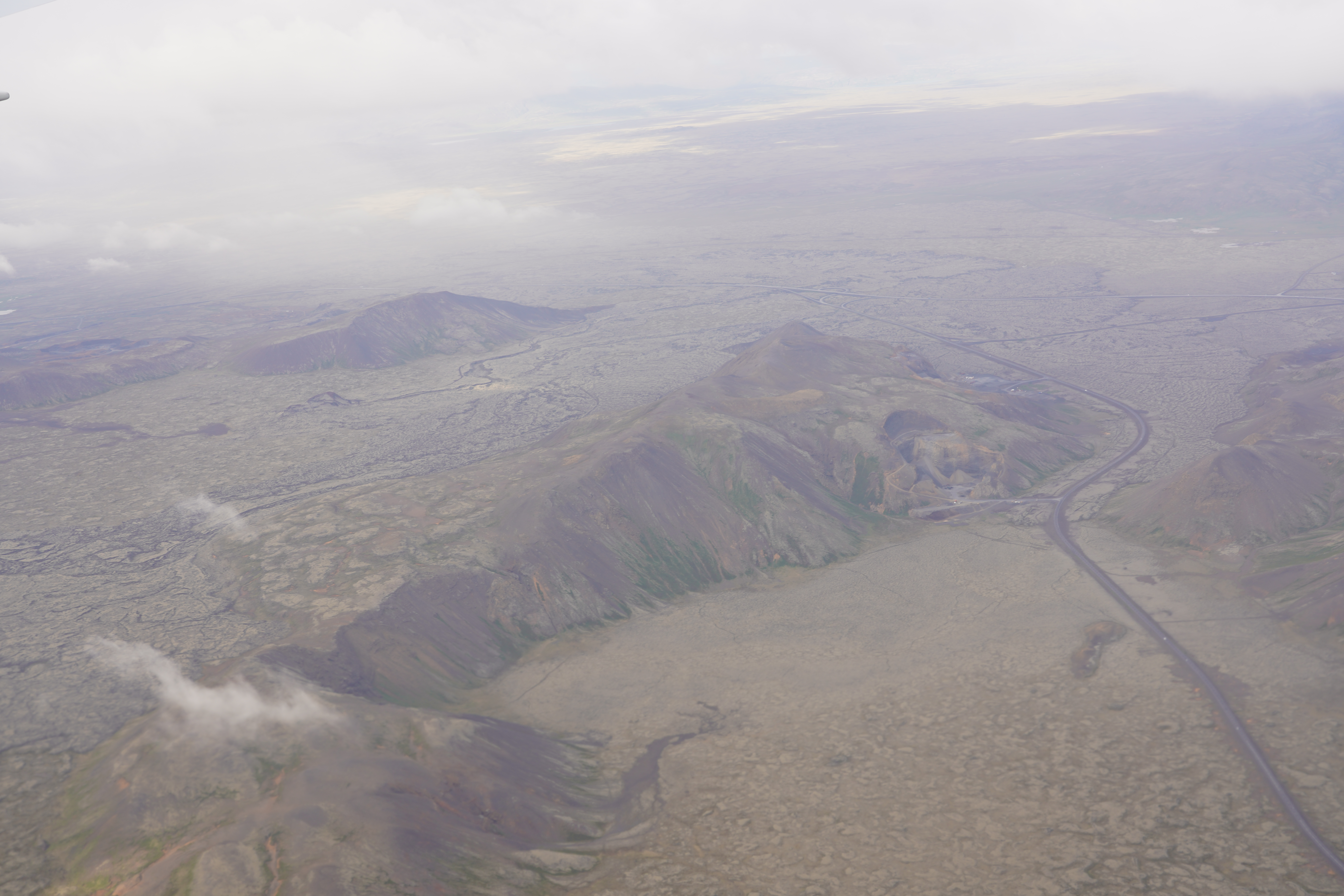
Aerial photograph of Hellisheiði: Lambafell, Leitahraun and behind it, to the left, Sauðadalahnúkur and the southern Bláfjöll

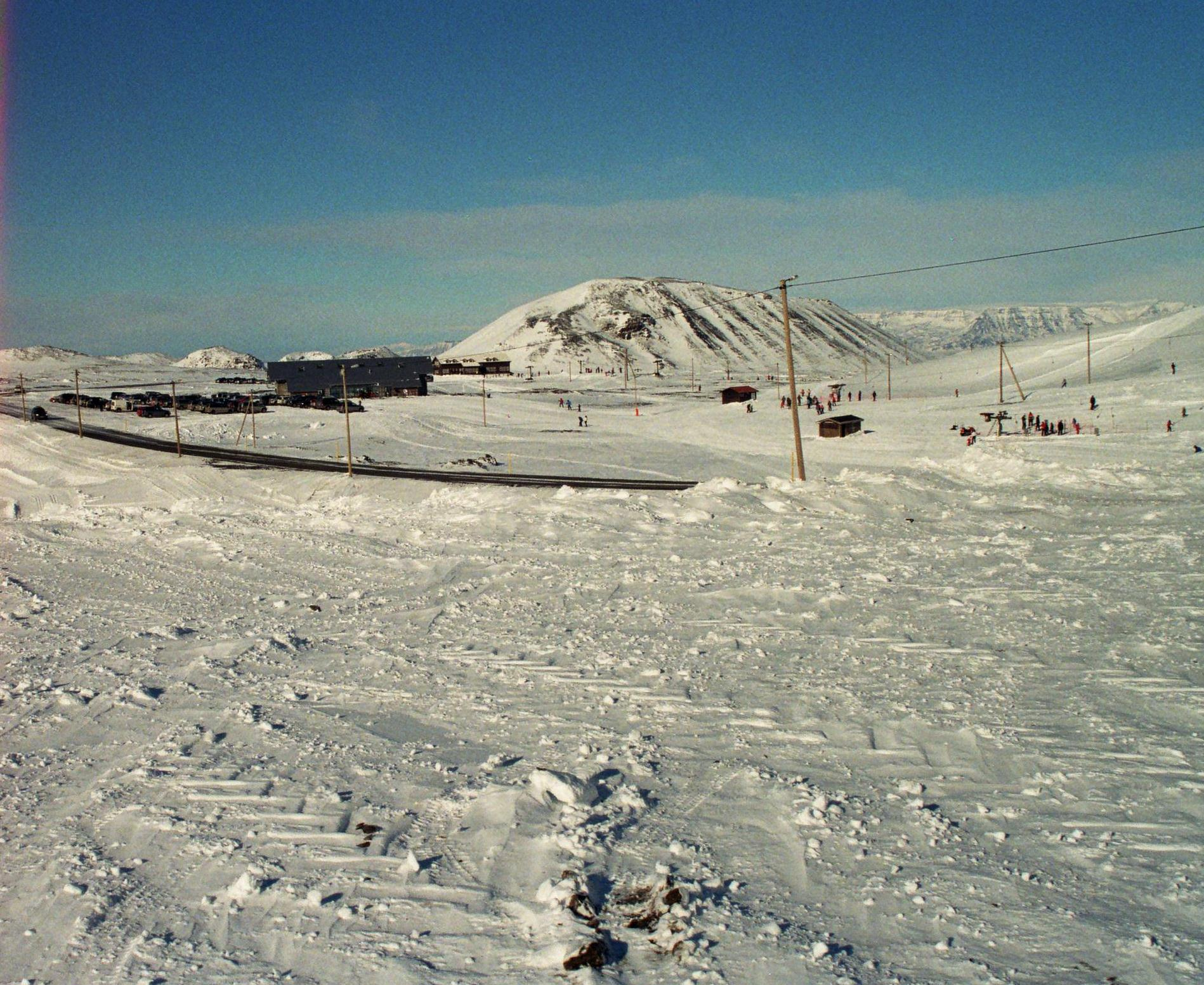
Ski resort Bláfjöll in 2011, Stóra-Kóngsfell in the background

Bláfjöll (Icelandic pronunciation: [ˈplauːˌfjœtl̥], "blue mountains") are a small mountain range in the southwest of Iceland on Reykjanes peninsula at about 30 km from Reykjavík.

They form sort of a double mountain massif to the west and in the east of Jósepsdalur on Hellisheiði.

== Geography ==
The mountain massif has a length of about 9 km. The western part includes Vífilsfell as well as Bláfjallahorn [ˈplauːˌfjatlaˌhɔ(r)tn̥], the eastern one reaches from Sauðadalahnúkur [ˈsœyːðaˌtaːlaˌn̥uːkʏr̥] to Kerlingarhnúkur [ˈcʰɛ(r)tliŋkarˌn̥uːkʏr̥]. The highest mountain is Hákollur [ˈhauːˌkʰɔtlʏr̥] (685 m).

== Geology ==
The Bláfjöll are Pleistocene subglacial volcanoes and part of the Brennisteinsfjöll volcanic system.

== Winter sports ==
The area is the most popular ski resort for the inhabitants of Iceland's Capital City Area.

The winter sports area is situated at elevations between 460 and 700 m.

15 km of easy and intermediate slopes for skiing and snowboarding as well as 15 lifts (tow lifts and chair lifts) are available as well as possibilities for night skiing. Cross country skiing is also possible. Two huts with accommodation and restaurant provide service for the guests. All this makes it the largest ski resort in Iceland.

== Accessibility ==
From Reykjavík the Hringvegur is followed in southern direction, at the airfield of Sandskeið taken the Route 417 in direction of Hafnarfjörður/Bláfjöll, but up on the lava plateau turned left into the short Bláfjallavegur/Route 407. It leads directly to the mountains and the skiing area.

== Nature protection ==
Part of the mountain range is protected since 1973 as Bláfjallafólkvangur. [ˈplauːˌfjatlaˌfoul̥kˌvauŋkʏr̥]

== See also ==
- Eldborg í Bláfjöllum
- Heiðin há
- Brennisteinsfjöll
- Sport in Iceland
