= List of highways numbered 418 =

The following highways are numbered 418:

== Canada ==
- Manitoba Provincial Road 418
- Newfoundland and Labrador Route 418
- Ontario Highway 418

== Japan ==
- Route 418 (Japan)

== Norway ==
- Fv418

== Thailand ==
Hwy 418

== United Kingdom ==
- A418 road Leighton Buzzard - Aylesbury

== United States ==
- Florida:
  - Florida State Road 418
  - Florida State Road 418 (former)
- Louisiana Highway 418
- Maryland Route 418
- New Mexico State Road 418
- New York State Route 418
- Pennsylvania Route 418
- Puerto Rico Highway 418
- South Carolina Highway 418
- Tennessee State Route 418

Preceded by 417	Lists of highways 418	Succeeded by 419
