= Jósepsdalur =

Valley in Iceland

- Jósefsdalur
- Location within Iceland
- Length: 2 km (1.2 mi) Southwestern

Geography
- Location: Hellisheiði, Selvogshreppur, Iceland
- Coordinates: 64°01′33″N 21°33′10″W
- Interactive map of Jósepsdalur

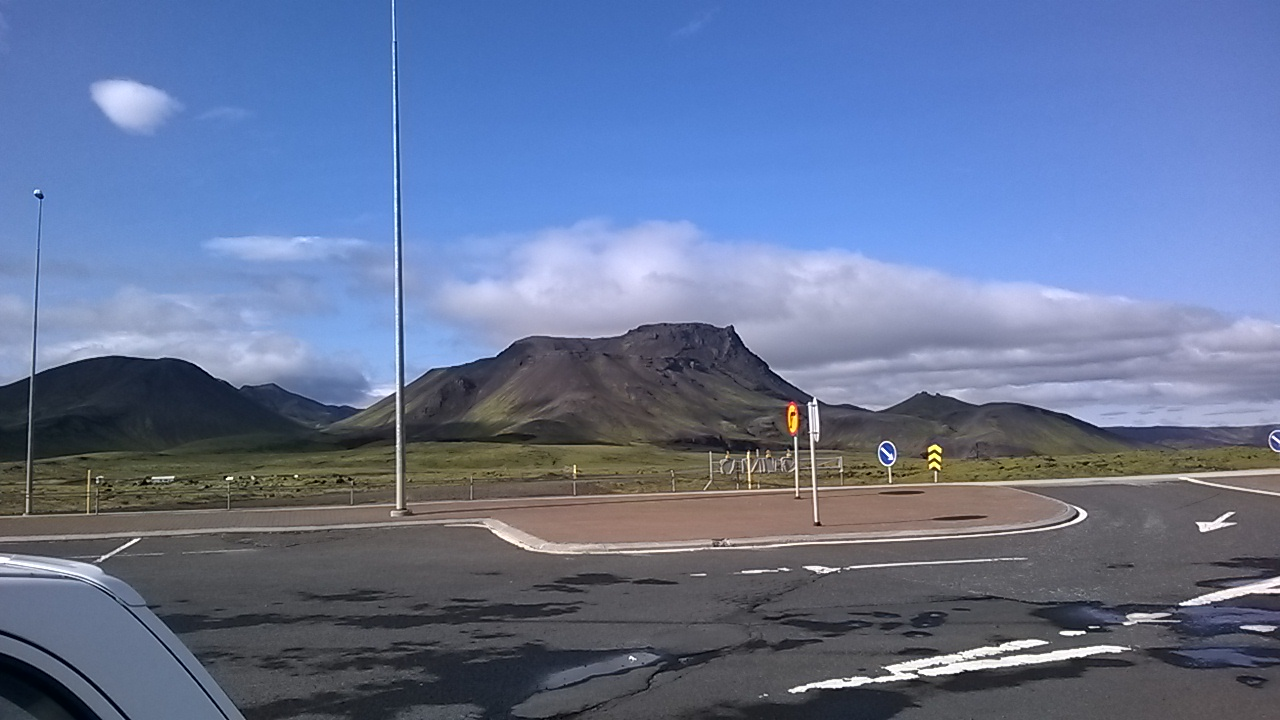
Vífilsfell from Litla Kaffistofan, Jósepsdalur to the left of the mountain

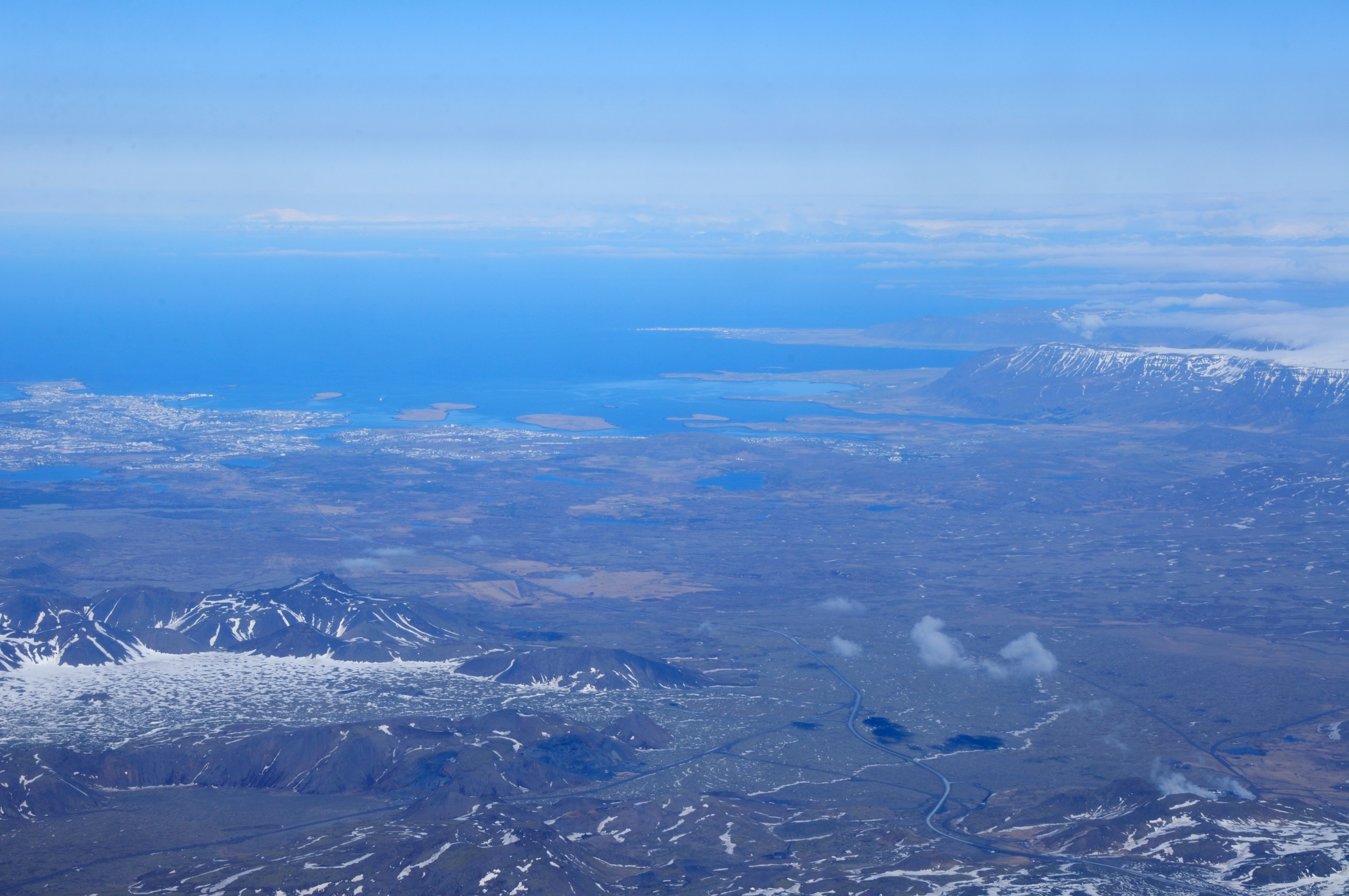
Jósepsdalur with snow in the foreground and south of Bláfjöll mountain massif

Jósepsdalur (Icelandic pronunciation: [ˈjouːsɛpsˌtaːlʏr̥]), also Jósefsdalur [-sɛfs-], is a small valley, about 2 km long in southwestern direction, and to the east of the volcano Vífilsfell up on Hellisheiði at a distance of about 25 km from Reykjavík within Selvogshreppur municipality. The Bláfjöll mountains surround the U-shaped valley.

The valley is situated next to an old trail over the pass Ölfusskarð from Ölfus, the region in the south of Iceland around Hveragerði, to Reykjavík.

== Folk tales ==
Acc. to an old folk tale, a troll woman shall have lived in a cave in Jósepsdalur.

Another folk tale explains the name of the valley: A man named Jósep lived in this valley once. He had a bad reputation for swearing and blasphemy. In the end, his farm with him and all his family was caught by the devil and disappeared in the underworld. Grímur Thomsen refers to the saga in his poem "Jósepsdalur".

== Sports in Jósepsdalur ==
The Jósepsdalur was from time to time famous for sports.

=== Skiing ===
Ski lifts and a ski school were in place in the valley from 1936 on. But today, these are installed in the Bláfjöll, i.e. on the northern side of the mountain massif.

=== Hiking ===
It is possible to hike up on Vífilsfell from Jósepsdalur.

Another hiking tour goes from Jósepsdalur over the pass Ólafsskarð to the Leitin shield volcano and from there following the Reykjavegur hiking trail, which crosses the Reykjanes peninsula from its tip at Reykjanesvíti and Gunnuhver to Þingvellir, to the craters Syðri Eldborg and Nyrðri Eldborg which produced around the year 1000 the Kristnitökuhraun lava field.

=== Motorsport ===
Some sorts of motorsport are today practised in the remote valley.
