= List of highways numbered 422 =

The following highways are numbered 422:

== Canada ==
- Manitoba Provincial Road 422
- Newfoundland and Labrador Route 422

== Japan ==
- Route 422 (Japan)

== United States ==
- Interstate 422 (future)
- U.S. Route 422
- Georgia State Route 422 (unsigned designation for Georgia State Route 10 Loop)
- Louisiana Highway 422
- Maryland Route 422
- New York State Route 422 (former)
- Oregon Route 422
  - Oregon Route 422S
- Puerto Rico Highway 422
- Tennessee State Route 422
- Texas State Highway Spur 422

== See also ==
- Special routes of U.S. Route 422

Preceded by 421	Lists of highways 422	Succeeded by 423
