= List of highways numbered 421 =

The following highways are numbered 421:

== Canada ==
- Manitoba Provincial Road 421
- Newfoundland and Labrador Route 421

== Japan ==
- Japan National Route 421

== United States ==
- U.S. Route 421
- Florida State Road 421
  - County Road 421 (Volusia County, Florida)
- Georgia State Route 421 (unsigned designation for Interstate 516)
- New Mexico State Road 421
- New York State Route 421
- Ohio State Route 421
- Puerto Rico Highway 421
- South Carolina Highway 421
- Tennessee State Route 421
- Texas State Highway Spur 421

| Preceded by 420 | Lists of highways 421 | Succeeded by 422 |
