= Japan National Route 420 =

National highway in Japan

National Route 420
- 国道420号
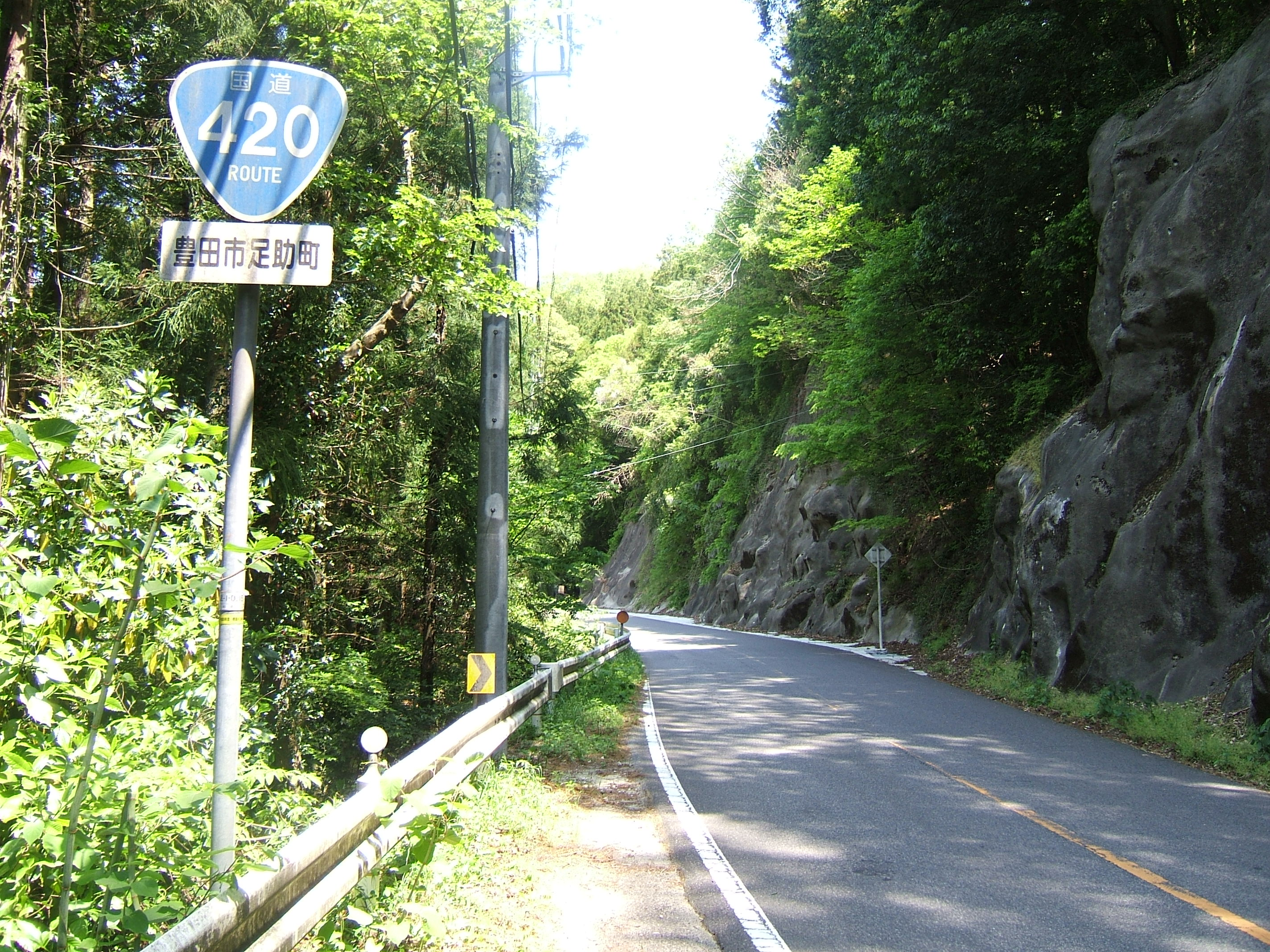

Route information
- Length: 66.5 km (41.3 mi)

Major junctions
- West end: National Route 153 in Toyota, Aichi
- East end: National Route 151 / National Route 257 in Shinshiro, Aichi

Location
- Country: Japan

Highway system
- National highways of Japan; Expressways of Japan
← National Route 419	→ National Route 421

National Route 420 is a national highway of Japan connecting Toyota, Aichi and Shinshiro, Aichi in Japan, with a total length of 66.5 km (41.32 mi).
