= Japan National Route 419 =

Road in Japan

National Route 419
- 国道419号
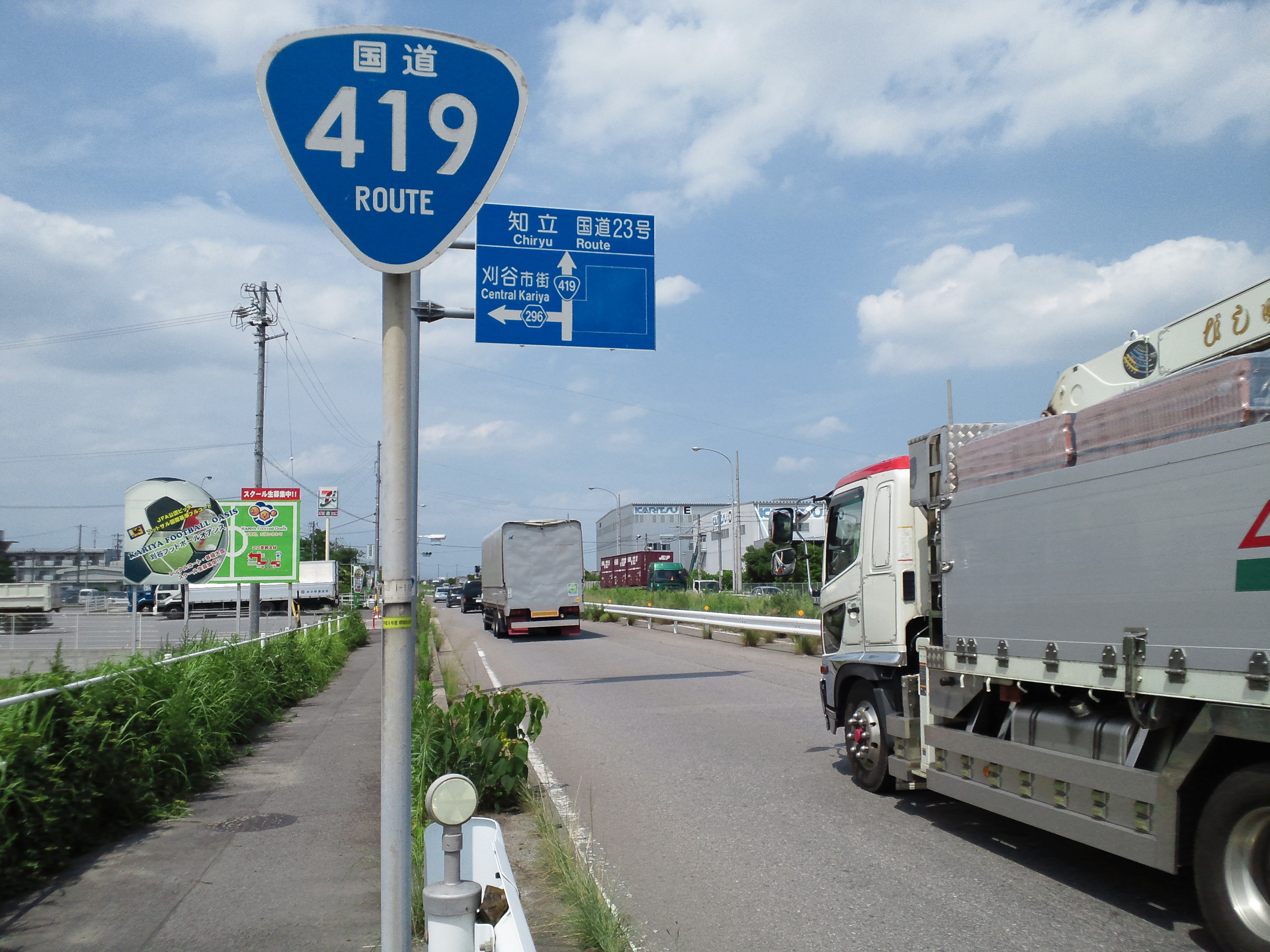

Route information
- Length: 62.4 km (38.8 mi)
- Existed: 1982–present

Major junctions
- North end: National Route 363 near Mizunami, Gifu
- South end: National Route 247 in Takahama, Aichi

Location
- Country: Japan

Highway system
- National highways of Japan; Expressways of Japan
← National Route 418	→ National Route 420

National Route 419 is a national highway of Japan connecting Mizunami, Gifu and Takahama, Aichi in Japan, with a total length of 62.4 km (38.77 mi).
