= Litla Kaffistofan =

Icelandic former roadside café

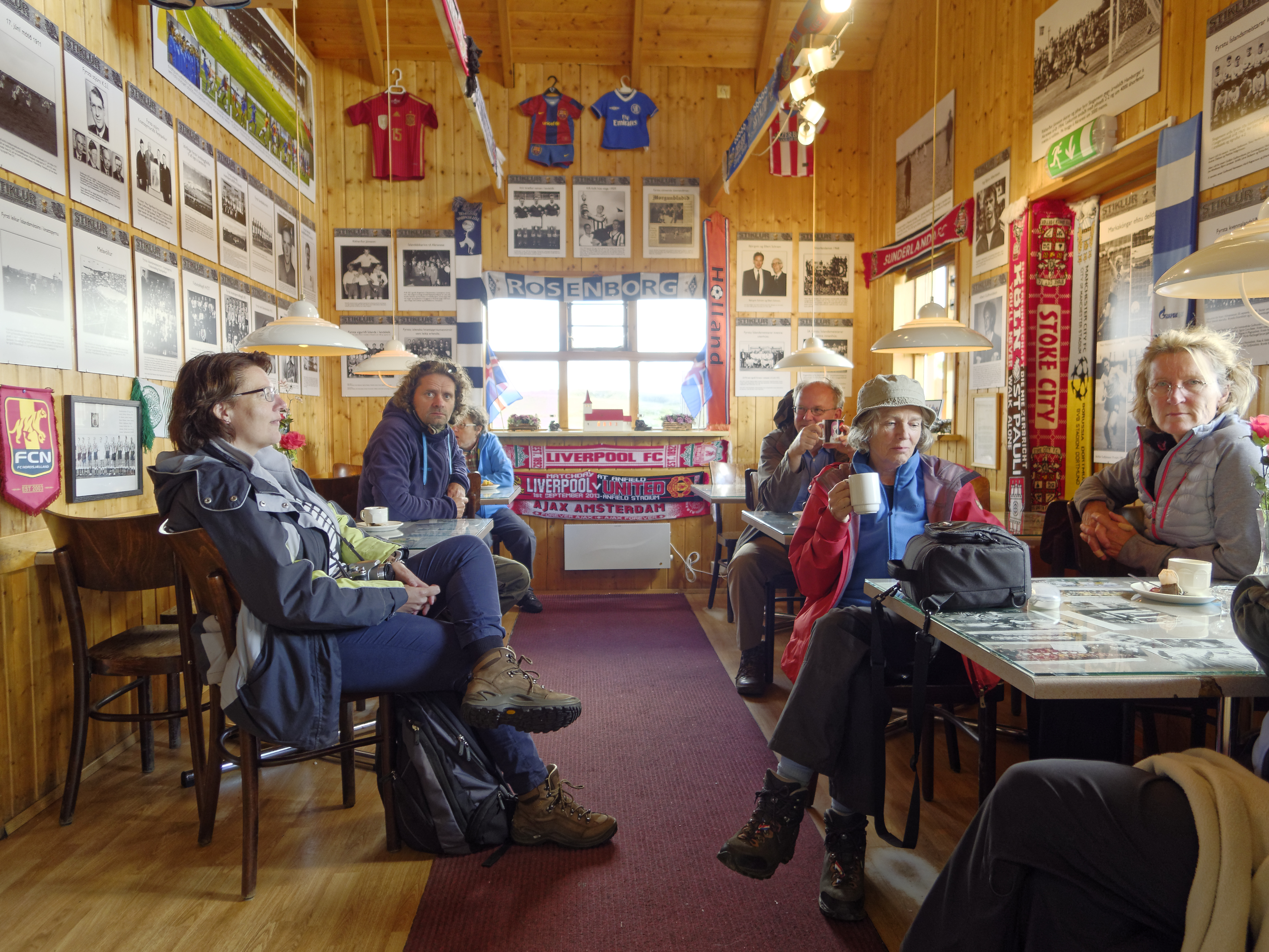
Diners in Litla Kaffistofan in 2015

Litla Kaffistofan (Little Café) is a former roadside café and service stop located along Route 1 in southwestern Iceland, approximately 20 kilometres east of Reykjavík.

It was founded on 4 June 1960. It was announced in 2025 that the shop would be closing on 28 June.
