= Interstate 420 =

Interstate 420 is the designation for two never-built Interstate Highways in the United States, both of which are related to Interstate 20:

- Interstate 420 (Georgia), a canceled bypass of Atlanta
- Interstate 420 (Louisiana), a canceled bypass of Monroe
