= List of highways numbered 417 =

The following highways are numbered 417:

== Canada ==
- Manitoba Provincial Road 417
- Newfoundland and Labrador Route 417
- Ontario Highway 417

== Costa Rica ==
- National Route 417

== Iceland ==
- Route 417

== Japan ==
- Japan National Route 417

== United States ==
- Florida State Road 417
- Georgia State Route 417 (unsigned designation for Interstate 575)
- Maryland Route 417 (former)
- New York:
  - New York State Route 417
  - New York State Route 417 (former)
- Pennsylvania Route 417
- Puerto Rico Highway 417
- South Carolina Highway 417
- Tennessee State Route 417

Preceded by 416	Lists of highways 417	Succeeded by 418
