= List of highways numbered 440 =

Route 440 or Highway 440 may refer to:

== Australia ==
- South Gippsland Highway

== Canada ==
- Manitoba Provincial Road 440
- New Brunswick Route 440
- Newfoundland and Labrador Route 440
- Quebec Autoroute 440

== Japan ==
- Route 440 (Japan)

== United States ==
- Interstate 440 (disambiguation)
- Arkansas Highway 440
- Hawaii Route 440
- Louisiana Highway 440
- Maryland Route 440
- New Jersey Route 440
- New York State Route 440
- Ohio State Route 440 (former)
- Puerto Rico Highway 440

Preceded by 439	Lists of highways 440	Succeeded by 441
