= List of express bus routes in New York City =

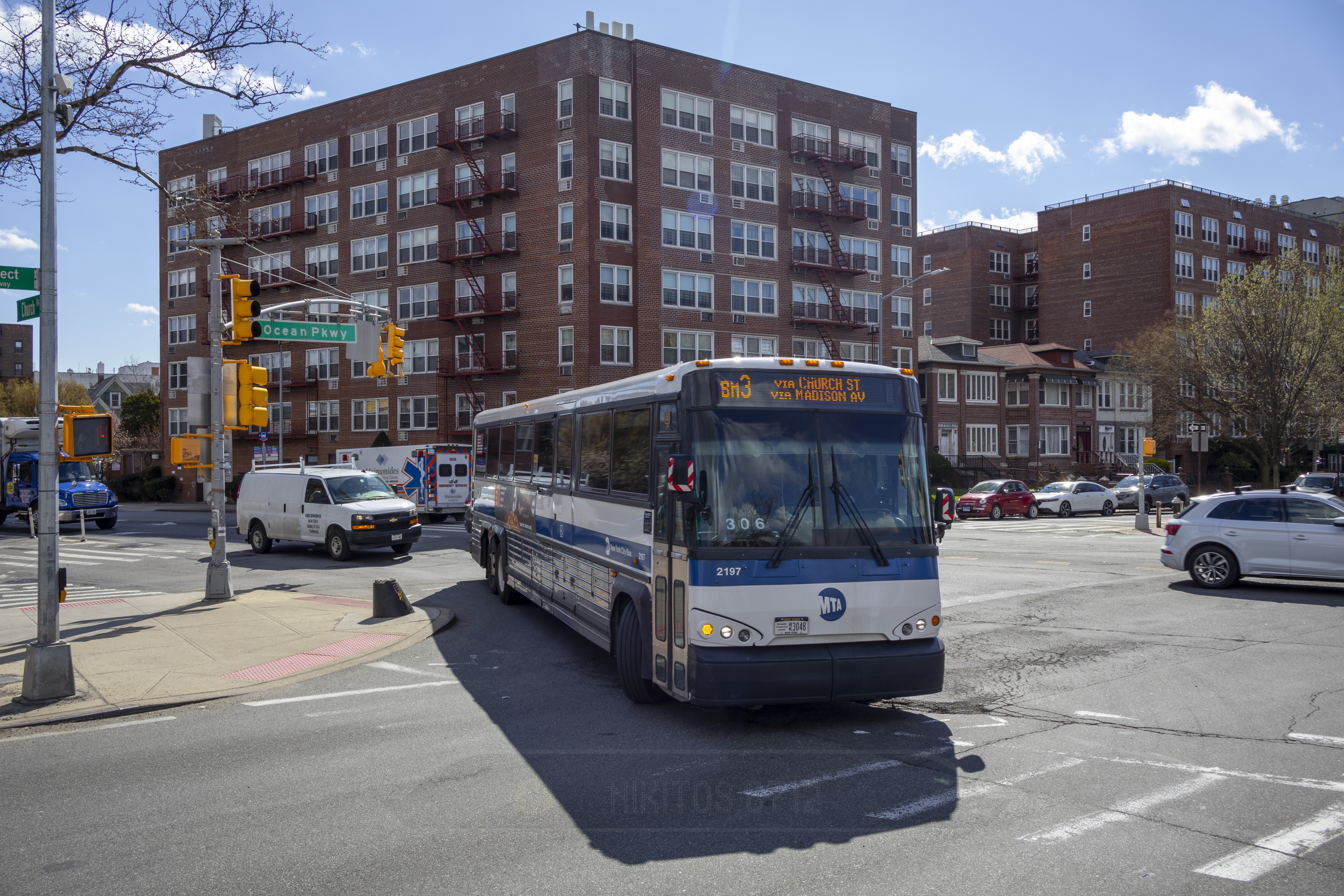
A MCI D4500CT on the BM3 route in April 2026

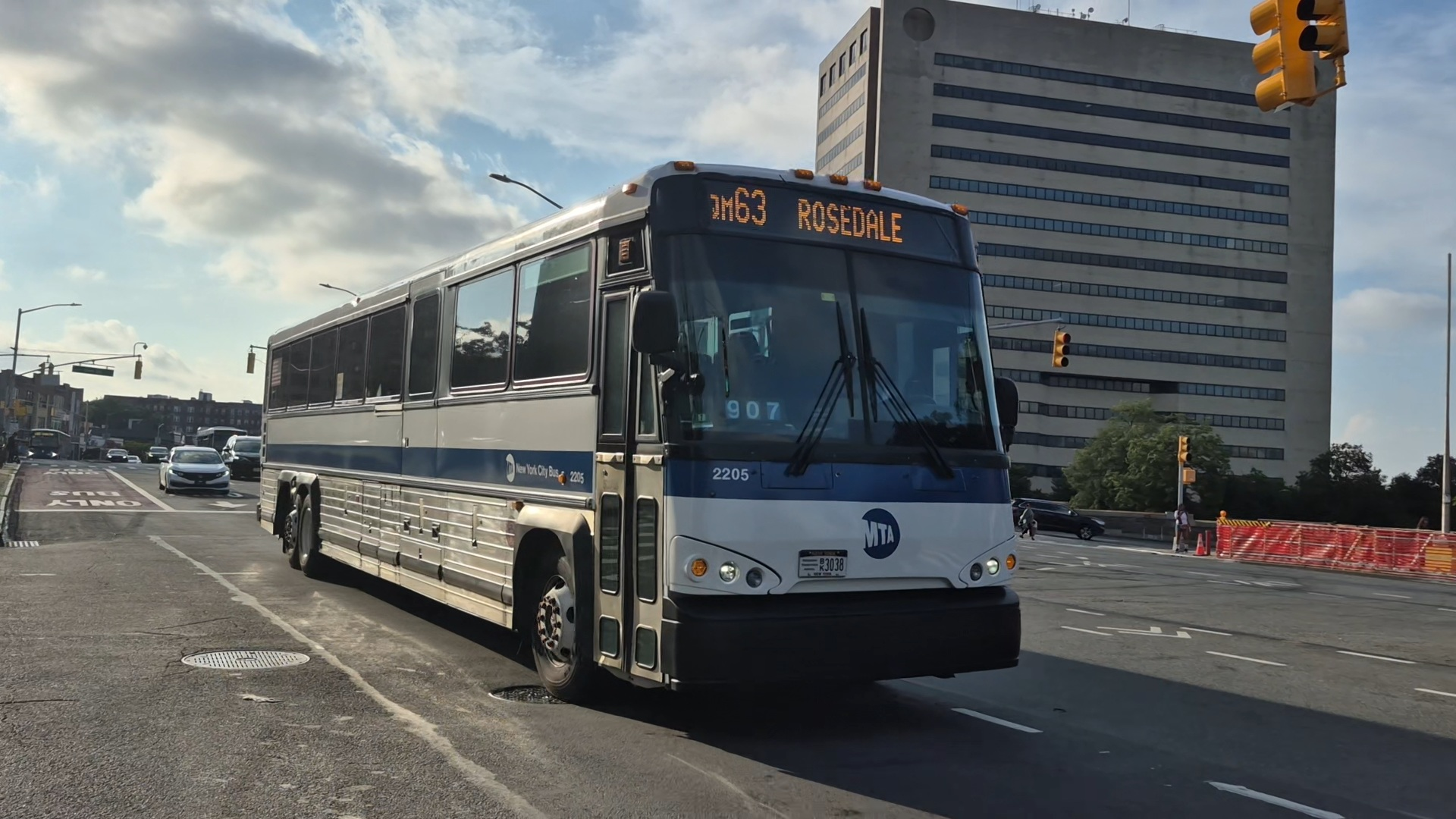
A MCI D4500CT on the Rosedale-bound QM63 in July 2025

The Metropolitan Transportation Authority (MTA) operates 80 express bus routes in New York City, United States. All express routes are assigned multi-borough (BM, BxM, QM, SIM) prefixes, except four routes operated by New York City Transit in Brooklyn, which are prefixed with the letter X.

The unidirectional fare, payable with MetroCard or OMNY, a contactless payment system, is $7.25. Discount fare media is available. Except for the ad-hoc X80 service, coins are not accepted on express buses.

Express buses operate using over-the-road diesel-powered, 45-ft-long coaches, from Motor Coach Industries and Prevost Car. For more information, visit the fleet page.

== Manhattan to Staten Island ==
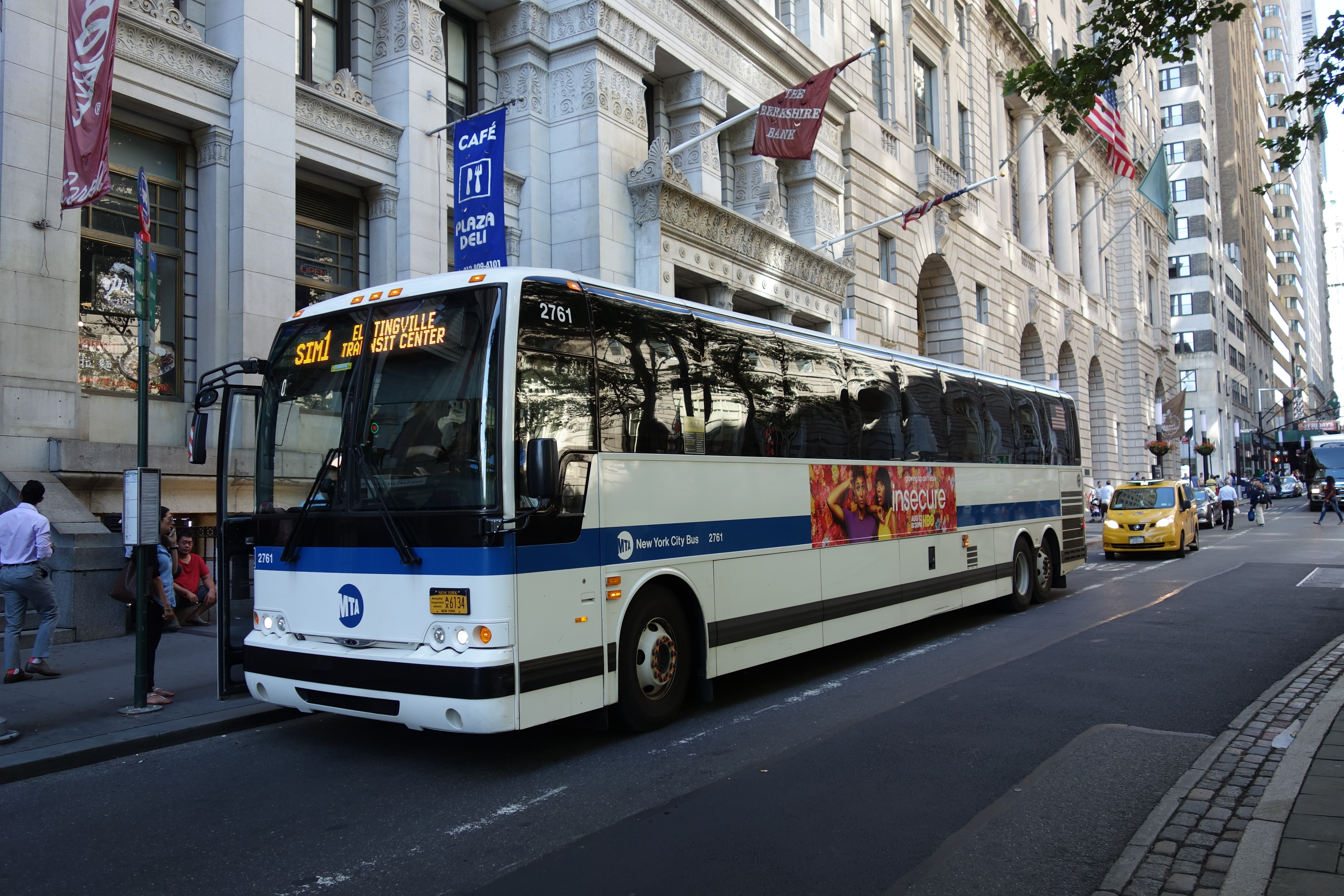
A Prevost X3-45 bus on the Eltingville-bound SIM1 at Bowling Green, four days after the X1 became the SIM1 on August 19, 2018.

Most routes travel to and from Staten Island via the Verrazzano–Narrows Bridge, Gowanus Expressway, and Hugh L. Carey Tunnel into Lower Manhattan. Some routes operate through New Jersey via the Goethals Bridge, New Jersey Turnpike, New Jersey Route 495, and Lincoln Tunnel to directly serve Midtown Manhattan.

On August 19, 2018, all of the Staten Island-Manhattan express bus routes were redesigned to offer simpler and direct routes, fewer stops to speed up the trips, and additional service for off-peak hours and weekends. The new routes originally planned consists of 21 express routes: 11 traveling to Midtown, 8 traveling to Downtown and 2 traveling to Greenwich Village via Battery Park City. The previously used "X" routes have been dropped in favor of "SIM," or Staten Island to Manhattan, routes. This was the result of the two-year Staten Island Bus Study conducted by MTA, launched in 2015, which analyzed trip performance data, ridership profiles and extensive customer input, to determine the most effective way to reconfigure the network.

All routes are operated by New York City Transit. All routes run during rush hours in the peak direction. In addition, the SIM1C, SIM3C, SIM4C and SIM33C provide off-peak weekday and weekend service, and the SIM1C provides overnight service. These four -C routes cover most stops in Manhattan served by other routes during peak hours.

Route	Manhattan terminal		Staten Island terminal	Manhattan streets	Via	Staten Island streets traveled
SIM1	Greenwich Village; Sixth Avenue and Houston Street (last drop-off); Broadway and Houston Street (first pick-up)	← AM → PM	Eltingville Transit Center	Church Street (northbound); Broadway (southbound)	Verrazzano–Narrows Bridge, Gowanus Expressway and Hugh L. Carey Tunnel	Hylan Boulevard, Richmond Avenue
SIM1C*	Midtown; Central Park South and Sixth Avenue	↔	Eltingville Transit Center	Church Street, Sixth Avenue (northbound); Fifth Avenue, Broadway (southbound)	Verrazzano–Narrows Bridge, Gowanus Expressway and Hugh L. Carey Tunnel	Hylan Boulevard, Richmond Avenue
SIM2	Downtown; Church Street and Worth Street (last drop-off); Broadway and Warren Street (first pick-up)	← AM → PM	Tottenville; Craig Avenue and Hylan Boulevard	Church Street (northbound); Broadway (southbound)	Verrazzano–Narrows Bridge, Gowanus Expressway and Hugh L. Carey Tunnel	Arden Avenue, Woodrow Road, Huguenot Avenue, Hylan Boulevard
SIM3	Midtown; Central Park South and Sixth Avenue	← AM → PM	Port Richmond; Castleton Avenue and Jewett Avenue	Sixth Avenue (northbound); Fifth Avenue (southbound); 23rd Street	Verrazzano–Narrows Bridge, Gowanus Expressway and Hugh L. Carey Tunnel	Narrows Road (SIM3c only); Victory Boulevard, Watchogue Road, Port Richmond Avenue
SIM3C	Midtown; Central Park South and Sixth Avenue	↔	Port Richmond; Castleton Avenue and Jewett Avenue	Church Street, Sixth Avenue (northbound); Fifth Avenue, Broadway (southbound)	Verrazzano–Narrows Bridge, Gowanus Expressway and Hugh L. Carey Tunnel	Narrows Road (SIM3c only); Victory Boulevard, Watchogue Road, Port Richmond Avenue
SIM4	Downtown; Church Street and Worth Street (last drop-off); Broadway and Chambers Street (first pick-up)	← AM → PM	Annadale; Annadale Road and Drumgoole Road West	Church Street (northbound); Broadway (southbound)	Verrazzano–Narrows Bridge, Gowanus Expressway and Hugh L. Carey Tunnel	Richmond Avenue
SIM4C	Midtown; Sixth Avenue and 59th Street	↔	Huguenot; Boulder Avenue and Woodrow Road (last drop-off); Vineland Avenue and Woodrow Road (first pick-up)	Church Street, Sixth Avenue, Madison Avenue (northbound); Fifth Avenue, Broadway (southbound)	Verrazzano–Narrows Bridge, Gowanus Expressway and Hugh L. Carey Tunnel	Richmond Avenue
SIM5	Downtown; Pearl Street and Peck Slip (last drop-off); Pearl Street and Frankfort Street (first pick-up)	← AM → PM	Eltingville Transit Center	Water Street	Verrazzano–Narrows Bridge, Gowanus Expressway and Hugh L. Carey Tunnel	Father Capodanno Boulevard, Hylan Boulevard, Nelson Avenue
SIM6	Midtown; Lexington Avenue and 57th Street (last drop-off); Lexington Avenue and 56th Street (first pick-up)	← AM → PM	Eltingville Transit Center	Madison Avenue (northbound); Lexington Avenue (southbound); 23rd Street	Verrazzano–Narrows Bridge, Gowanus Expressway and Hugh L. Carey Tunnel	Father Capodanno Boulevard, Hylan Boulevard, Nelson Avenue
SIM7	Greenwich Village; Sixth Avenue and 14th Street (last drop-off); Broadway and 13th Street (first pick-up)	← AM → PM	Eltingville Transit Center	Sixth Avenue (northbound); Broadway, Houston Street (southbound); West Street	Verrazzano–Narrows Bridge, Gowanus Expressway and Hugh L. Carey Tunnel	Narrows Road, Hylan Boulevard, Richmond Avenue
SIM8	Midtown; 57th Street and Lexington Avenue	← AM → PM	Huguenot; Woodrow Road and Huguenot Avenue	42nd Street; Madison Avenue (northbound); Fifth Avenue (southbound)	Goethals Bridge, NJ Turnpike, and Lincoln Tunnel	Goethals Road; Richmond Avenue, Woodrow Road
SIM9	Greenwich Village; Sixth Avenue and 14th Street (last drop-off); Broadway and 13th Street (first pick-up)	← AM → PM	Eltingville; Hylan Boulevard and Richmond Avenue	Sixth Avenue (northbound); Broadway, Houston Street (southbound); West Street	Verrazzano–Narrows Bridge, Gowanus Expressway and Hugh L. Carey Tunnel	Father Capodanno Boulevard, Hylan Boulevard
SIM10	Midtown; Central Park South and Sixth Avenue	← AM → PM	Eltingville Transit Center	Sixth Avenue (northbound); Fifth Avenue (southbound); 23rd Street	Verrazzano–Narrows Bridge, Gowanus Expressway and Hugh L. Carey Tunnel	Narrows Road, Hylan Boulevard, Richmond Avenue
SIM11	Midtown; Lexington Avenue and 57th Street (last drop-off); Lexington Avenue and 56th Street (first pick-up)	← AM → PM	New Dorp; Ebbitts Street and Mill Road	Madison Avenue (northbound); Lexington Avenue (southbound); 23rd Street	Verrazzano–Narrows Bridge, Gowanus Expressway and Hugh L. Carey Tunnel	Narrows Road, Hylan Boulevard
SIM15	Downtown; Water Street and Hanover Square (last drop-off); Trinity Place and Rector Street (first pick-up)	← AM → PM	Eltingville Transit Center	Church Street, Water Street	Verrazzano–Narrows Bridge, Gowanus Expressway and Hugh L. Carey Tunnel	Narrows Road, Richmond Road, Arthur Kill Road
SIM22	Midtown; 57th Street and Lexington Avenue	← AM → PM	Eltingville; Woods of Arden Road and Hylan Boulevard	Madison Avenue (northbound); Lexington Avenue (southbound); 42nd Street	Goethals Bridge, NJ Turnpike, and Lincoln Tunnel	Arthur Kill Road, Richmond Avenue
SIM23	Midtown; Madison Avenue and 59th Street (last drop-off); Fifth Avenue and 59th Street (first pick-up)	← AM → PM	Annadale; Poillion Avenue and Hylan Boulevard	Madison Avenue (northbound); Fifth Avenue (southbound); 34th Street	Goethals Bridge, NJ Turnpike, and Lincoln Tunnel	Arden Avenue
SIM24	Midtown; Madison Avenue and 59th Street (last drop-off); Fifth Avenue and 59th Street (first pick-up)	← AM → PM	Huguenot; Hylan Boulevard and Luten Avenue	Madison Avenue (northbound); Fifth Avenue (southbound); 34th Street	Goethals Bridge, NJ Turnpike, and Lincoln Tunnel	Hylan Boulevard
SIM25	Midtown; 57th Street and Lexington Avenue	← AM → PM	Tottenville; Craig Avenue and Hylan Boulevard	Madison Avenue (northbound); Fifth Avenue (southbound); 42nd Street	Goethals Bridge, NJ Turnpike, and Lincoln Tunnel	Rossville Avenue, Foster Road, Hylan Boulevard
SIM26	Midtown; 57th Street and Lexington Avenue	← AM → PM	Tottenville; Page Avenue and Hylan Boulevard (last drop-off); Bedell Avenue and Hylan Boulevard (first pick-up)	Madison Avenue (northbound); Lexington Avenue (southbound); 42nd Street	Goethals Bridge, NJ Turnpike, and Lincoln Tunnel	Bloomingdale Road, Amboy Road, Hylan Boulevard
SIM30	Midtown; Sixth Avenue and 59th Street	← AM → PM	Sunnyside; Clove Road and Victory Boulevard	Madison Avenue (northbound); Fifth Avenue (southbound); 42nd Street	Goethals Bridge, NJ Turnpike, and Lincoln Tunnel	Forest Avenue; Victory Boulevard (Sunnyside service); Tompkins Avenue (Rosebank service)
SIM30	Midtown; Sixth Avenue and 59th Street	← AM → PM	Rosebank; Tompkins Avenue and Hylan Boulevard	Madison Avenue (northbound); Fifth Avenue (southbound); 42nd Street	Goethals Bridge, NJ Turnpike, and Lincoln Tunnel	Forest Avenue; Victory Boulevard (Sunnyside service); Tompkins Avenue (Rosebank service)
SIM31	Midtown; 57th Street and Lexington Avenue	← AM → PM	Eltingville Transit Center	Madison Avenue (northbound); Fifth Avenue (southbound); 23rd Street	Verrazzano–Narrows Bridge, Gowanus Expressway and Hugh L. Carey Tunnel	Gannon Avenue, Bradley Avenue, Harold Street, Forest Hill Road, Travis Avenue
SIM32	Downtown; Church Street and Worth Street (last drop-off); Broadway and Warren Street (first pick-up)	← AM → PM	Travis; Victory Boulevard bus loop	Church Street (northbound); Broadway (southbound)	Verrazzano–Narrows Bridge, Gowanus Expressway and Hugh L. Carey Tunnel	Gannon Avenue, Victory Boulevard
SIM33	Downtown; Sixth Avenue and 14th Street (last drop-off); Broadway and 13th Street (first pick-up)	← AM → PM	Mariners Harbor; South Avenue and Richmond Terrace	Sixth Avenue (northbound); Broadway, Houston Street (southbound); West Street	Verrazzano–Narrows Bridge, Gowanus Expressway and Hugh L. Carey Tunnel	Narrows Road (SIM33C only); Gannon Avenue, Richmond Avenue, Forest Avenue
SIM33C	Midtown; Central Park South and Sixth Avenue	↔	Mariners Harbor; South Avenue and Richmond Terrace	Church Street, Sixth Avenue, Madison Avenue (northbound); Broadway, Fifth Avenue (southbound)	Verrazzano–Narrows Bridge, Gowanus Expressway and Hugh L. Carey Tunnel	Narrows Road (SIM33C only); Gannon Avenue, Richmond Avenue, Forest Avenue
SIM34	Downtown; Sixth Avenue and Houston Street (last drop-off); Broadway and Houston Street (first pick-up)	← AM → PM	Mariners Harbor; South Avenue and Richmond Terrace	Church Street (northbound); Broadway (southbound)	Verrazzano–Narrows Bridge, Gowanus Expressway and Hugh L. Carey Tunnel	Victory Boulevard, Watchogue Road, Richmond Avenue, Forest Avenue, South Avenue
SIM35	Downtown; Pearl Street and Peck Slip (last drop-off); Pearl Street and Frankfort Street (first pick-up)	← AM → PM	Port Richmond; Castleton Avenue and Jewett Avenue	Water Street	Verrazzano–Narrows Bridge, Gowanus Expressway and Hugh L. Carey Tunnel	Narrows Road, Clove Road, Forest Avenue, Port Richmond Avenue

=== History and notes ===
Route	Original route(s)	History
SIM1 SIM1C	X1, X3, X4	Operates all times: SIM1 operates only during peak hours; SIM1C operates during all other times; SIM1 extended to SoHo (Houston Street) from Worth Street on January 13th, 2019.
SIM2	X17C, X19	Extended from Huguenot to Tottenville via Hylan Boulevard; As of January 13, 2019, off-peak service was eliminated due to low ridership.
SIM3 SIM3C	X10, X12, X14, X42	Operates during both peak and off-peak hours; SIM3 operates only during peak hours; SIM3C operates during off-peak hours via Lower Manhattan; SIM3 operates via 23rd Street and the FDR Drive to bypass intermediate stops to the south during peak hours (similar to former X42).
SIM4 SIM4C	X17A, X17C	Operates during both peak and off-peak hours; SIM4 & SIM4X operate only during peak hours; SIM4C operates during off-peak hours; SIM4X ran express along Richmond Avenue, only stopping at Lamberts Lane and the Staten Island Mall (Lamberts Lane stop added January 13, 2019). This variant was discontinued on August 29, 2025 due to low ridership. Trips were only about 15 percent full on average. Some of the funds saved will be used to add seven full SIM4 trips.; Former weekend service to Bay Ridge, Brooklyn (under former X17C) eliminated.; Late evening Staten Island-bound SIM4C service extended west to Huguenot Avenue along SIM8 route on October 7, 2018; As of January 13, 2019, SIM4C buses were extended to Huguenot in order to replace the SIM2 off-peak
SIM5	X4, X7, X8	Originally had an express variant, SIM5X, non-stop from South Beach Park & Ride to Manhattan mornings only.; SIM5X extended to New Dorp at Tysens Lane on September 7, 2018 to serve the community better, but the entire route was quickly discontinued on October 7, 2018 due to low ridership.
SIM6	X5, X7	Staten Island-bound trips rerouted from 5th Avenue to Lexington Avenue on August 30, 2018 following customer complaints.; The northern terminal was relocated from Sixth Avenue and Central Park South to Lexington Avenue and 57th Street to prevent buses from getting stuck in crosstown traffic.; Originally had an express variant, SIM6X, non-stop from South Beach Park & Ride to Manhattan mornings only.; SIM6X extended to New Dorp at Tysens Lane on September 7, 2018 to serve the community better, but the entire route was quickly discontinued on October 7, 2018 due to low ridership.
SIM7	X1, X3, X4, X7, X9	Created on August 19th, 2018 to provide Eltingville and Hylan Blvd riders direct West Street/Greenwich Village service.
SIM8	X17J, X23	SIM8X ran express along Richmond Avenue, only stopping at Lamberts Lane and the Staten Island Mall (Lamberts Lane stop added January 13, 2019). This variant was discontinued on August 29, 2025 due to low ridership. Trips were only about 25 percent full on average. Some of the funds saved will be used to add two full SIM8 trips.
SIM9	X1, X3, X4, X7, X9	Added on October 7, 2018 to provide West Street/Greenwich Village service on Father Capodanno Boulevard; Also provided to alleviate SIM7 congestion and reuse the bus loop on Richmond Avenue.
SIM10	X1, X2, X5, X7, X9	
SIM11	X2	Added on January 13, 2019 to provide more reliable service between the northern portion of the Hylan Blvd corridor and East Midtown, and restore usage of the old New Dorp terminal on Mill Road.
SIM15	X15	
SIM22	X1, X5, X17J, X21, X23	Staten Island-bound trips rerouted from Fifth Avenue to Lexington Avenue on August 30, 2018
SIM23 SIM24	X17J, X23, X24	Was operated by Academy Bus until Dec 30, 2021.; SIM23 and SIM24 rerouted from 42nd Street onto 34th Street on November 5, 2018, replicating X23/X24 route; SIM24 rerouted to Outerbridge Park & Ride on January 13, 2020, discontinued by MTA NYCT on January 3, 2022; SIM23 extended west along Hylan Boulevard to Luten Avenue to replace SIM24 service, while also expanding service to Southeast Annadale, MTA NYCT extended SIM23 to Poillion Avenue and Hylan Blvd.; Service started operations by MTA New York City Transit on January 3, 2022.
SIM25	X22, X23	New route replaced former X23 service on Foster Road in Prince’s Bay
SIM26	X17, X22	Staten Island-bound trips rerouted from 5th Avenue to Lexington Avenue on August 30, 2018; No service to Outerbridge Park & Ride
SIM30	X12, X14, X30, X42	A pilot branch via Tompkins Avenue provides some Manhattan-bound service for former X18 riders (the X18 previously served Downtown. This branch serves Midtown)
SIM31	X10, X31	
SIM32	X10, X11	
SIM33	X10, X12	Created on August 19th, 2018 to provide Mariners Harbor and North Shore riders direct West Street/Greenwich Village service.
SIM33C	X10, X12	Created on January 13, 2019 as an off-peak version of the SIM33 extended to Midtown via Church Street and Madison Avenue, also serving Narrows Road
SIM34	X12	SIM34 extended to SoHo (Houston Street) from Worth Street on January 13th, 2019.
SIM35	X10, X14	

== Manhattan to Brooklyn ==
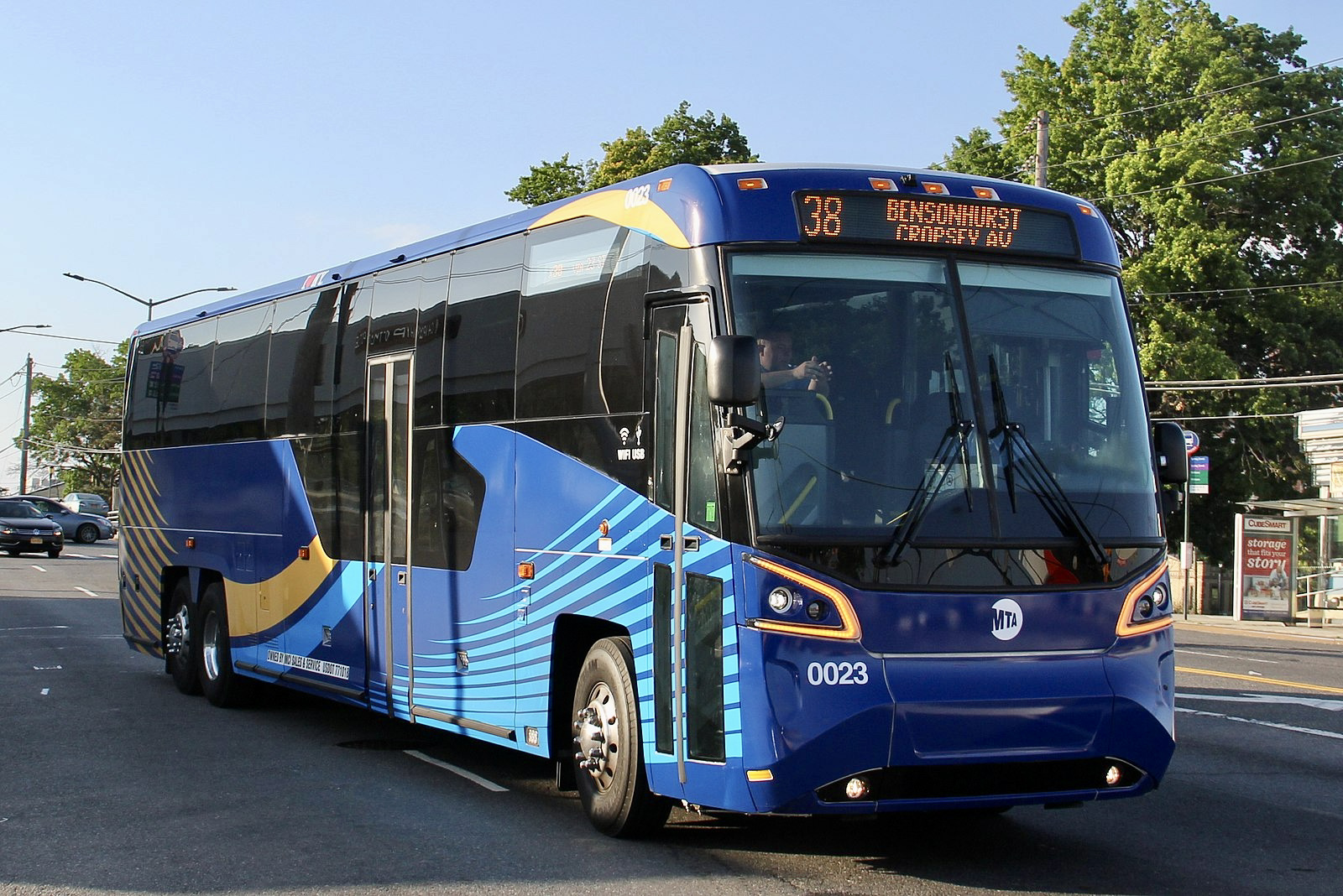
A MCI D45 CRT LE bus on the Bensonhurst-bound X38. This was only a demo bus and is no longer in passenger service.

X- routes are operated by New York City Transit, while BM-routes are operated by MTA Bus Company. All routes operate nonstop between Brooklyn and Manhattan via the Gowanus Expressway or Prospect Expressway to the Hugh L. Carey Tunnel, with some routes continuing non-stop via the FDR Drive to reach Midtown. The exception to this is the BM5, which also makes stops in Queens and uses Woodhaven Boulevard, the Long Island Expressway and Queens Midtown Tunnel to reach Midtown.

Route	Manhattan terminal		Brooklyn terminal	Manhattan streets traveled	Via	Brooklyn streets traveled
X27	Midtown East 57th Street and Madison Avenue; Chelsea West 23rd Street and Broadway; Lower Manhattan Thomas Street and Church Street	↔	Bay Ridge; Shore Road and 4th Avenue	Church Street, Sixth Avenue, Madison Avenue (northbound); Fifth Avenue, Park Avenue South, Broadway (southbound)	Gowanus Expressway, Hugh L. Carey Tunnel	3rd Avenue, Bay Ridge Avenue, Shore Road
X28	Midtown East 57th Street and Madison Avenue; Chelsea West 23rd Street and Broadway; Lower Manhattan Thomas Street and Church Street	↔	Bensonhurst; Cropsey Avenue and Canal Avenue	Church Street, Sixth Avenue, Madison Avenue (northbound); Fifth Avenue, Park Avenue South, Broadway (southbound)	Gowanus Expressway, Hugh L. Carey Tunnel	86th Street, 14th Avenue, Cropsey Avenue, Surf Avenue
X28	Midtown East 57th Street and Madison Avenue; Chelsea West 23rd Street and Broadway; Lower Manhattan Thomas Street and Church Street	↔	Sea Gate; West 37th Street and Surf Avenue	Church Street, Sixth Avenue, Madison Avenue (northbound); Fifth Avenue, Park Avenue South, Broadway (southbound)	Gowanus Expressway, Hugh L. Carey Tunnel	86th Street, 14th Avenue, Cropsey Avenue, Surf Avenue
X37	Midtown; East 57th Street and Madison Avenue	← AM → PM	Bay Ridge; Shore Road and 4th Avenue	23rd Street; Madison Avenue (northbound); Fifth Avenue (southbound)	Gowanus Expressway, Hugh L. Carey Tunnel	3rd Avenue, Bay Ridge Avenue, Shore Road
X38	Midtown; East 57th Street and Madison Avenue	← AM → PM	Bensonhurst; Cropsey Avenue and Canal Avenue	23rd Street; Madison Avenue (northbound); Fifth Avenue (southbound)	Gowanus Expressway, Hugh L. Carey Tunnel	86th Street, 14th Avenue, Cropsey Avenue, Surf Avenue
X38	Midtown; East 57th Street and Madison Avenue	← AM → PM	Sea Gate; West 37th Street and Surf Avenue	23rd Street; Madison Avenue (northbound); Fifth Avenue (southbound)	Gowanus Expressway, Hugh L. Carey Tunnel	86th Street, 14th Avenue, Cropsey Avenue, Surf Avenue
BM1	Midtown; East 57th Street and 2nd Avenue	↔	Mill Basin; 56th Drive and Strickland Avenue	Trinity Place, Park Row, Water Street (Downtown Loop); 23rd Street; Madison Avenue (northbound); Fifth Avenue (southbound)	Prospect Expressway, Hugh L. Carey Tunnel	Ocean Avenue, Avenue K
BM1	Downtown; State Street and Battery Place	← AM → PM	Mill Basin; 56th Drive and Strickland Avenue	Trinity Place, Park Row, Water Street (Downtown Loop); 23rd Street; Madison Avenue (northbound); Fifth Avenue (southbound)	Prospect Expressway, Hugh L. Carey Tunnel	Ocean Avenue, Avenue K
BM2	Midtown; East 57th Street and 2nd Avenue	↔	Canarsie; Flatlands Avenue and Williams Avenue	Trinity Place, Park Row, Water Street (Downtown Loop); 23rd Street; Madison Avenue (northbound); Fifth Avenue (southbound)	Prospect Expressway, Hugh L. Carey Tunnel	Flatbush Avenue, Avenue H, Avenue M; Pennsylvania Avenue (Downtown trips only)
BM2	Downtown; State Street and Battery Place	← AM → PM	Starrett City; Pennsylvania Avenue and Seaview Avenue	Trinity Place, Park Row, Water Street (Downtown Loop); 23rd Street; Madison Avenue (northbound); Fifth Avenue (southbound)	Prospect Expressway, Hugh L. Carey Tunnel	Flatbush Avenue, Avenue H, Avenue M; Pennsylvania Avenue (Downtown trips only)
BM3	Midtown; East 57th Street and 2nd Avenue	↔	Sheepshead Bay; Emmons Avenue and Shore Boulevard	Trinity Place, Park Row, Water Street (Downtown Loop); 23rd Street; Madison Avenue (northbound); Fifth Avenue (southbound)	Prospect Expressway, Hugh L. Carey Tunnel	Coney Island Avenue, Ocean Avenue, Emmons Avenue
BM3	Downtown; State Street and Battery Place	← AM → PM	Sheepshead Bay; Emmons Avenue and Shore Boulevard	Trinity Place, Park Row, Water Street (Downtown Loop); 23rd Street; Madison Avenue (northbound); Fifth Avenue (southbound)	Prospect Expressway, Hugh L. Carey Tunnel	Coney Island Avenue, Ocean Avenue, Emmons Avenue
BM4	Midtown; East 57th Street and 2nd Avenue	↔	Gerritsen Beach; Gerritsen Avenue and Lois Avenue	Trinity Place, Park Row, Water Street (Downtown Loop); 23rd Street; Madison Avenue (northbound); Fifth Avenue (southbound)	Prospect Expressway, Hugh L. Carey Tunnel	Coney Island Avenue, Nostrand Avenue, Gerritsen Avenue
BM4	Downtown; State Street and Battery Place	← AM → PM	Gerritsen Beach; Gerritsen Avenue and Lois Avenue	Trinity Place, Park Row, Water Street (Downtown Loop); 23rd Street; Madison Avenue (northbound); Fifth Avenue (southbound)	Prospect Expressway, Hugh L. Carey Tunnel	Coney Island Avenue, Nostrand Avenue, Gerritsen Avenue
BM5	Midtown; East 57th Street and 2nd Avenue	↔	Starrett City; Pennsylvania Avenue and Seaview Avenue	Fifth Avenue (southbound); Madison Avenue (northbound); 34th Street	Long Island Expressway, Queens Midtown Tunnel	Woodhaven Boulevard, Linden Boulevard, Pennsylvania Avenue

=== History and notes ===
Route	History
X27	Rush Hour service terminates at Thomas Street or 23rd Street; All weekend service terminates at 57th Street; Service began on January 3, 1972 as the B27X as the first express bus route between Manhattan and Brooklyn, was renumbered X27 in 1976; Stop at Battery Place and Greenwich Street added in 1981; In January 2000, the MTA announced plans to reroute northbound X27, X28, and X29 to run directly via Greenwich Street and Trinity Place after exiting the Brooklyn Battery Tunnel, instead of running via a 0.5 miles (0.80 km)-long loop consisting of West Street, Battery Place, Greenwich Street, and Trinity Place. The reroute would eliminate three left turns and the need to travel through two traffic lights. While making the loop normally took about five minutes, it could take 15 minutes or longer under heavy traffic congestion. Service to the Greenwich Street and Battery Place bus stop, used by 475 people per weekday, or 11 percent of all Manhattan-bound riders on the three routes would be discontinued. The change, which would take effect the same month, was expected to save $20,000 a year. This change had been implemented successfully on the X1 and X14 bus routes. The change took effect in February 2000. In July 2000, the MTA announced plans to reverse the change for northbound X1, X12, X27, X28, and X29 service during morning peak periods due to the planned extension of the Gowanus Expressway High-Occupancy Vehicle (HOV) Lane through the Brooklyn Battery Tunnel during the morning peak period between 6 a.m. and 10 a.m.. The change would be made since the extension of the HOV lane would prevent vehicles from moving between the left and right tubes within the toll plaza at the entrance to the tunnel, meaning buses using the HOV lane would no longer be able to exit on Trinity Place. To address the fact that the reroute would restore the congested through loop, MTA Bridges and Tunnels planned to place police officers and traffic agents at key locations to regulate traffic flow. The change, which would take effect in late July 2000, was expected to increase annual operating costs by $32,000.; Weekend service added September 2002
X28	Seagate served part-time in the peak direction and late nights only; service terminates at Thomas Street or 23rd Street; All weekend service terminates at 57th Street; In January 2000, the MTA announced plans to reroute northbound X27, X28, and X29 to run directly via Greenwich Street and Trinity Place after exiting the Brooklyn Battery Tunnel, instead of running via a 0.5 miles (0.80 km)-long loop consisting of West Street, Battery Place, Greenwich Street, and Trinity Place. The reroute would eliminate three left turns and the need to travel through two traffic lights. While making the loop normally took about five minutes, it could take 15 minutes or longer under heavy traffic congestion. Service to the Greenwich Street and Battery Place bus stop, used by 475 people per weekday, or 11 percent of all Manhattan-bound riders on the three routes would be discontinued. The change, which would take effect the same month, was expected to save $20,000 a year. This change had been implemented successfully on the X1 and X14 bus routes. The change took effect in February 2000. In July 2000, the MTA announced plans to reverse the change for northbound X1, X12, X27, X28, and X29 service during morning peak periods due to the planned extension of the Gowanus Expressway High-Occupancy Vehicle (HOV) Lane through the Brooklyn Battery Tunnel during the morning peak period between 6 a.m. and 10 a.m.. The change would be made since the extension of the HOV lane would prevent vehicles from moving between the left and right tubes within the toll plaza at the entrance to the tunnel, meaning buses using the HOV lane would no longer be able to exit on Trinity Place. To address the fact that the reroute would restore the congested through loop, MTA Bridges and Tunnels planned to place police officers and traffic agents at key locations to regulate traffic flow. The change, which would take effect in late July 2000, was expected to increase annual operating costs by $32,000.; Formerly terminated at Cropsey Avenue and Bay 49th Street in Brooklyn; Weekend service added September 2002 and eliminated June 2010-September 2016 due to budget crisis; Originally B28X in 1971, then renumbered as the X28 in 1976.; Overnight service began on May 6, 2020 due to the overnight subway shutdown caused by the COVID-19 pandemic; discontinued on June 28, 2020 due to low ridership.
X37 X38	No weekend service; No stops in Manhattan south of 23rd Street; Temporarily eliminated June 2010-July 2011 due to budget crisis
BM1 BM2 BM3 BM4	No overnight or Sunday service; Midtown service via Downtown area operates all day; Downtown-only and Midtown-only services operate weekday peak rush hours only, the latter of which are designated “Super Express”.; BM1 service began on July 10, 1972, running from Avenue U and Bergen Avenue to Madison Avenue and 56th Street.; BM1, BM2, BM3 operated by Pioneer Bus until 1979, BM4 began operating on July 16, 1984; all routes then operated by Command Bus Company until 2005; BM2 extended to Starrett City from Canarsie in October 1974; Overnight BM2 and BM3 service began on May 6, 2020 due to the overnight subway shutdown caused by the COVID-19 pandemic.; BM2/BM3 overnight service discontinued on June 28, 2020 due to low ridership.
BM5	Operated by Pioneer Bus until 1979, Command Bus Company 1979-2005; Formerly made only one stop in Queens, at 79th Street in Lindenwood; expanded service along Woodhaven and Cross Bay Boulevards began April 2010; Renumbered from BQM1 on July 16, 2007.

=== Proposed routes under the Brooklyn Bus Redesign ===
The MTA released a draft plan for Brooklyn's bus network redesign on December 1, 2022. The new plan retains the "BM" prefix and preserves all existing routes. The BM1, BM2, BM3, BM4, X27/X37, and X28/X38 will each be split into three routes: a rush-hour downtown route, a rush-hour midtown route, and an off-peak downtown and midtown route. In general, the revised plan includes the following changes:

- All routes with the X prefix will be relabeled with the BM prefix; i.e. the X27, X28, X37, and X38 will become the BM7, BM8, BM37, and BM38 respectively.
- All peak downtown routes will have a single-digit number (e.g. BM1).
- All peak midtown routes will have a double-digit number beginning in 3 (e.g. BM31).
- All off-peak downtown and midtown routes will have a single-digit number and the suffix "C" (e.g. BM1C).
- All off-peak routes operated by MTA Bus will eliminate Saturday service due to low ridership.

Route	Manhattan terminal		Brooklyn terminal	Manhattan streets traveled	Via	Brooklyn streets traveled	Notes
BM1	Downtown; State Street and Battery Place	← AM → PM	Mill Basin; 56th Drive and Strickland Avenue	Water Street	Prospect Expressway, Hugh L. Carey Tunnel	Beverley Road, Ocean Avenue, Avenue J, Avenue K	In Lower Manhattan, the BM1/BM1C would be rerouted to Water Street to simplify service.; Between Ocean and Coney Island Avenues in Brooklyn, the BM1/BM1C/BM31 would use Beverley Road instead of Cortelyou Road.; Between Flatbush and Ocean Avenues in Brooklyn, the BM1/BM1C/BM31 would use Avenue J instead of Avenue K.
BM1C	Midtown; East 57th Street and 2nd Avenue	⇆	Mill Basin; 56th Drive and Strickland Avenue	Water Street, FDR Drive, 23rd Street; Madison Avenue (northbound); Fifth Avenue (southbound)	Prospect Expressway, Hugh L. Carey Tunnel	Beverley Road, Ocean Avenue, Avenue J, Avenue K	In Lower Manhattan, the BM1/BM1C would be rerouted to Water Street to simplify service.; Between Ocean and Coney Island Avenues in Brooklyn, the BM1/BM1C/BM31 would use Beverley Road instead of Cortelyou Road.; Between Flatbush and Ocean Avenues in Brooklyn, the BM1/BM1C/BM31 would use Avenue J instead of Avenue K.
BM2	Downtown; State Street and Battery Place	← AM → PM	Starrett City; Pennsylvania Avenue and Seaview Avenue	Water Street	Prospect Expressway, Hugh L. Carey Tunnel	Beverley Road, Flatbush Avenue, Avenue H, Avenue M, Pennsylvania Avenue	In Lower Manhattan, the BM2/BM2C would be rerouted to Water Street to simplify service.; Between Ocean and Coney Island Avenues in Brooklyn, the BM2/BM2C/BM32 would use Beverley Road instead of Cortelyou Road.
BM2C	Midtown; East 57th Street and 2nd Avenue	⇆	Canarsie; Flatlands Avenue and Williams Avenue	Water Street, FDR Drive, 23rd Street; Madison Avenue (northbound); Fifth Avenue (southbound)	Prospect Expressway, Hugh L. Carey Tunnel	Beverley Road, Flatbush Avenue, Avenue H, Avenue M, Pennsylvania Avenue	In Lower Manhattan, the BM2/BM2C would be rerouted to Water Street to simplify service.; Between Ocean and Coney Island Avenues in Brooklyn, the BM2/BM2C/BM32 would use Beverley Road instead of Cortelyou Road.
BM3	Downtown; State Street and Battery Place	← AM → PM	Sheepshead Bay; Emmons Avenue and Shore Boulevard	Water Street	Prospect Expressway, Hugh L. Carey Tunnel	Ocean Avenue, Avenue X, Batchelder Street, Emmons Avenue	In Lower Manhattan, the BM3/BM3C would be rerouted to Water Street to simplify service.; Between Beverley Road and the Prospect Expressway, the BM3/BM3C/BM33 would use a more direct routing along Caton Avenue and Ocean Parkway.; Between Ocean and Coney Island Avenues in Brooklyn, the BM3/BM3C/BM33 would use Beverley Road instead of Cortelyou Road.
BM3C	Midtown; East 57th Street and 2nd Avenue	⇆	Sheepshead Bay; Emmons Avenue and Shore Boulevard	Trinity Place, Park Row, Water Street (Downtown Loop)	Prospect Expressway, Hugh L. Carey Tunnel	Ocean Avenue, Avenue X, Batchelder Street, Emmons Avenue	In Lower Manhattan, the BM3/BM3C would be rerouted to Water Street to simplify service.; Between Beverley Road and the Prospect Expressway, the BM3/BM3C/BM33 would use a more direct routing along Caton Avenue and Ocean Parkway.; Between Ocean and Coney Island Avenues in Brooklyn, the BM3/BM3C/BM33 would use Beverley Road instead of Cortelyou Road.
BM4	Downtown; State Street and Battery Place	← AM → PM	Gerritsen Beach; Gerritsen Avenue	Water Street	Prospect Expressway, Hugh L. Carey Tunnel	Coney Island Avenue, Avenue L, Nostrand Avenue, Gerritsen Avenue	In Lower Manhattan, the BM4/BM4C would be rerouted to Water Street to simplify service.; In central Brooklyn, the BM4/BM4C/BM34 would be rerouted to Coney Island Avenue and Avenue L to provide new service to Midwood and reduce the number of turns.
BM4C	Midtown; East 57th Street and 2nd Avenue	⇆	Gerritsen Beach; Gerritsen Avenue	Water Street, FDR Drive, 23rd Street; Madison Avenue (northbound); Fifth Avenue (southbound)	Prospect Expressway, Hugh L. Carey Tunnel	Coney Island Avenue, Avenue L, Nostrand Avenue, Gerritsen Avenue	In Lower Manhattan, the BM4/BM4C would be rerouted to Water Street to simplify service.; In central Brooklyn, the BM4/BM4C/BM34 would be rerouted to Coney Island Avenue and Avenue L to provide new service to Midwood and reduce the number of turns.
BM7	Downtown; Thomas Street and Church Street	↔	Bay Ridge; Shore Road and 4th Avenue	Church Street (northbound); Broadway (southbound)	Gowanus Expressway, Hugh L. Carey Tunnel	3rd Avenue, Bay Ridge Avenue, Shore Road	Replaces downtown-only variant of X27.; In Manhattan, all trips would terminate at Duane Street and begin at Thomas Street due to low ridership between Duane/Thomas Streets and 23rd Street.
BM7C	Midtown; East 57th Street and 2nd Avenue	↔	Bay Ridge; Shore Road and 4th Avenue	Church Street, Sixth Avenue, Madison Avenue (northbound); Fifth Avenue, Broadway (southbound)	Gowanus Expressway, Hugh L. Carey Tunnel	3rd Avenue, Bay Ridge Avenue, Shore Road	Service between Duane/Thomas Streets and 23rd Street provided during off-peak hours only.
BM8	Downtown; Thomas Street and Church Street	↔	Bensonhurst; Cropsey Avenue and Canal Avenue	Church Street (northbound); Broadway (southbound)	Gowanus Expressway, Hugh L. Carey Tunnel	86th Street, 14th Avenue, Cropsey Avenue	Replaces downtown-only variant of X28.; In Manhattan, all trips would terminate at Duane Street and begin at Thomas Street due to low ridership between Duane/Thomas Streets and 23rd Street.; In Brooklyn, all trips would terminate at Cropsey Avenue and Canal Avenue due to low ridership in Sea Gate.
BM8C	Midtown; East 57th Street and 2nd Avenue	↔	Bensonhurst; Cropsey Avenue and Canal Avenue	Church Street, Sixth Avenue, Madison Avenue (northbound); Fifth Avenue, Broadway (southbound)	Gowanus Expressway, Hugh L. Carey Tunnel	86th Street, 14th Avenue, Cropsey Avenue	Service between Duane/Thomas Streets and 23rd Street provided during off-peak hours only.
BM31	Midtown; East 57th Street and 2nd Avenue	↔	Mill Basin; 56th Drive and Strickland Avenue	FDR Drive, 23rd Street; Madison Avenue (northbound); Fifth Avenue (southbound)	Prospect Expressway, Hugh L. Carey Tunnel	Beverley Road, Ocean Avenue, Avenue J, Avenue K	Between Ocean and Coney Island Avenues in Brooklyn, the BM1/BM1C/BM31 would use Beverley Road instead of Cortelyou Road.; Between Flatbush and Ocean Avenues in Brooklyn, the BM1/BM1C/BM31 would use Avenue J instead of Avenue K.
BM32	Midtown; East 57th Street and 2nd Avenue	↔	Canarsie; Flatlands Avenue and Williams Avenue	FDR Drive, 23rd Street; Madison Avenue (northbound); Fifth Avenue (southbound)	Prospect Expressway, Hugh L. Carey Tunnel	Flatbush Avenue, Avenue H, Avenue M	Between Ocean and Coney Island Avenues in Brooklyn, the BM2/BM2C/BM32 would use Beverley Road instead of Cortelyou Road.
BM33	Midtown; East 57th Street and 2nd Avenue	↔	Sheepshead Bay; Emmons Avenue and Shore Boulevard	FDR Drive, 23rd Street; Madison Avenue (northbound); Fifth Avenue (southbound)	Prospect Expressway, Hugh L. Carey Tunnel	Ocean Avenue, Avenue X, Batchelder Street, Emmons Avenue	Between Beverley Road and the Prospect Expressway, the BM3/BM3C/BM33 would use a more direct routing along Caton Avenue and Ocean Parkway.; Between Ocean and Coney Island Avenues in Brooklyn, the BM3/BM3C/BM33 would use Beverley Road instead of Cortelyou Road.
BM34	Midtown; East 57th Street and 2nd Avenue	↔	Gerritsen Beach; Gerritsen Avenue and Lois Avenue	FDR Drive, 23rd Street; Madison Avenue (northbound); Fifth Avenue (southbound)	Prospect Expressway, Hugh L. Carey Tunnel	Coney Island Avenue, Avenue L, Nostrand Avenue, Gerritsen Avenue	In central Brooklyn, the BM4/BM4C/BM34 would be rerouted to Coney Island Avenue and Avenue L to provide new service to Midwood and reduce the number of turns.
BM35	Midtown; East 57th Street and 2nd Avenue	↔	Starrett City; Pennsylvania Avenue and Seaview Avenue	Fifth Avenue (southbound); Madison Avenue (northbound); 34th Street	Long Island Expressway, Queens Midtown Tunnel	Woodhaven Boulevard, Linden Boulevard, Pennsylvania Avenue	BM5 relabeled to BM35 to reflect its Midtown terminus. Service would continue to operate during midday hours.; Only other changes would be to stop spacing.
BM37	Midtown; East 57th Street and Madison Avenue	← AM → PM	Bay Ridge; Shore Road and 4th Avenue	FDR Drive, 23rd Street; Madison Avenue (northbound); Fifth Avenue (southbound)	Gowanus Expressway, Hugh L. Carey Tunnel	3rd Avenue, Bay Ridge Avenue, Shore Road	Replaces midtown-only variant of X37.; Only other changes would be to stop spacing.
BM38	Midtown; East 57th Street and Madison Avenue	← AM → PM	Bensonhurst; Cropsey Avenue and Canal Avenue	FDR Drive, 23rd Street; Madison Avenue (northbound); Fifth Avenue (southbound)	Gowanus Expressway, Hugh L. Carey Tunnel	86th Street, 14th Avenue, Cropsey Avenue	Replaces midtown-only variant of X38.; In Brooklyn, all trips would terminate at Cropsey Avenue and Canal Avenue due to low ridership in Sea Gate.

== Manhattan to Queens ==
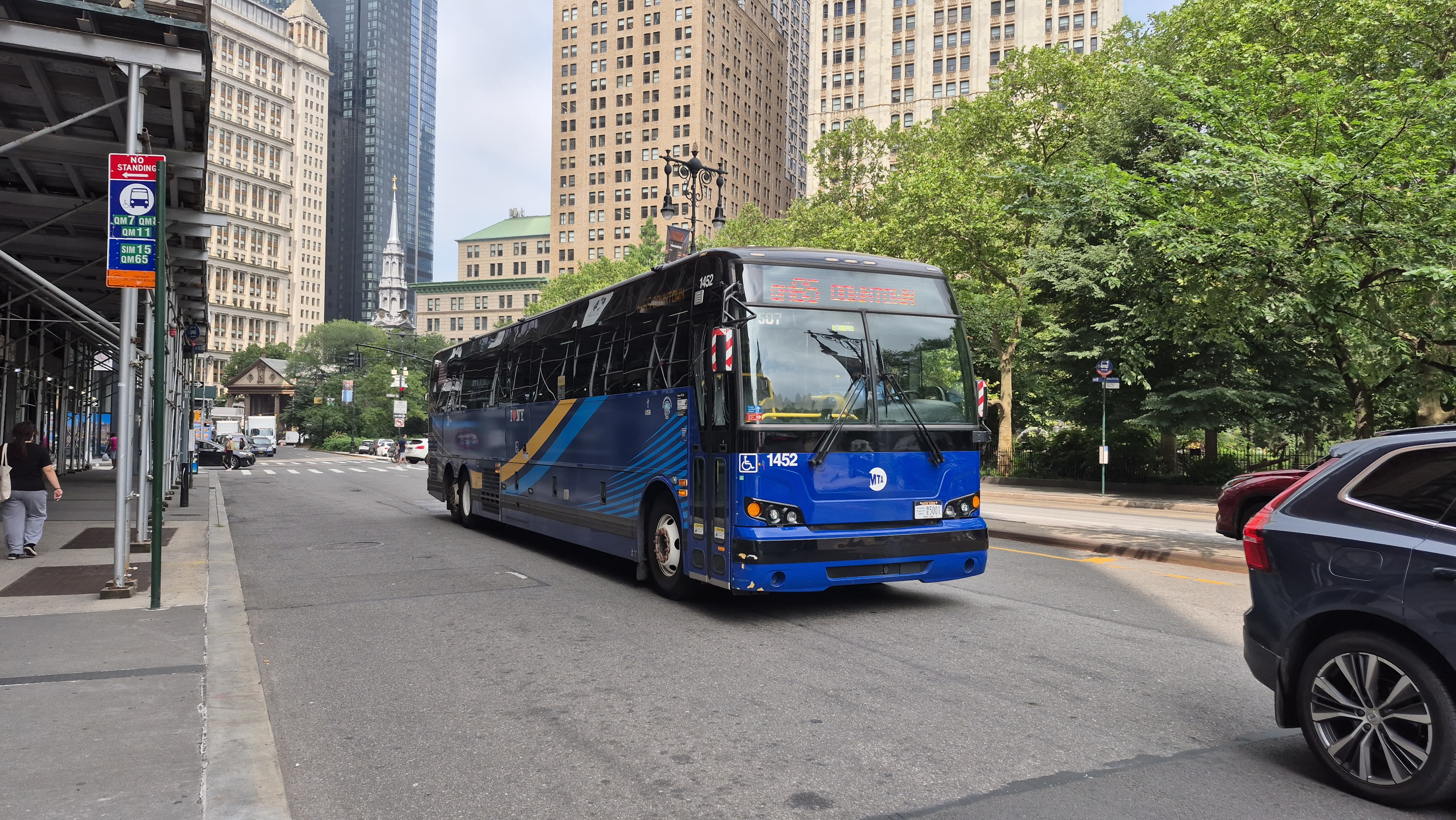
A Prevost X3-45 bus on the Downtown-bound QM65

All Midtown routes except for the QM2, QM5 and QM20 Super Expresses operate nonstop outbound via the Ed Koch Queensboro Bridge, while Downtown routes operate via the FDR Drive and the Queens Midtown Tunnel. All inbound service operates via the Long Island Expressway and Queens Midtown Tunnel. All routes are operated by the MTA Bus Company, except for the QM63, QM64, and QM68, which are operated by New York City Transit.

Route	Manhattan terminal		Queens terminal	Manhattan streets traveled	Queens streets traveled
QM1	Midtown; 57th Street and Third Avenue (last drop-off); 36th Street and Sixth Avenue (first pick-up)	↔	Fresh Meadows; 188th Street and 64th Avenue	34th Street, Sixth Avenue, 57th Street	Union Turnpike, 188th Street
QM2	Midtown; 57th Street and Third Avenue (last drop-off); 36th Street and Sixth Avenue (first pick-up)	↔	Bay Terrace; Bay Terrace Shopping Center	34th Street, Sixth Avenue; 57th Street (inbound); 59th Street (outbound)	Whitestone Expressway service road (weekdays); Parsons Boulevard (weekends); Cross Island Parkway service road
QM2 Super Express	Midtown; 35th Street and Sixth Avenue	→ PM	Bay Terrace; Bay Terrace Shopping Center	34th Street, Sixth Avenue, 36th Street	Whitestone Expressway service road (weekdays); Parsons Boulevard (weekends); Cross Island Parkway service road
QM4	Midtown; 57th Street and Third Avenue (last drop-off); 36th Street and Sixth Avenue (first pick-up)	↔	Electchester; 164th Street and Horace Harding Expressway	34th Street, Sixth Avenue, 57th Street	Jewel Avenue
QM5	Midtown; 57th Street and Third Avenue (last drop-off); 36th Street and Sixth Avenue (first pick-up)	↔	Glen Oaks; 260th Street and Union Turnpike	34th Street, Sixth Avenue, 57th Street	Union Turnpike, 73rd Avenue, Horace Harding Expressway
QM5 Super Express	Midtown; 35th Street and Sixth Avenue	→ PM	Glen Oaks; 260th Street and Union Turnpike	34th Street, Sixth Avenue, 36th Street	Union Turnpike, 73rd Avenue, Horace Harding Expressway
QM6	Midtown; 57th Street and Third Avenue (last drop-off); 36th Street and Sixth Avenue (first pick-up)	↔	Lake Success; North Shore Towers	34th Street, Sixth Avenue, 57th Street	Union Turnpike, Lakeville Road
QM7	Downtown; Frankfort Street and Pearl Street (last drop-off); Pearl Street and Peck Slip (first pick-up)	← AM → PM	Fresh Meadows; 188th Street and 64th Avenue	Water Street, Church Street	Union Turnpike, 188th Street; 73rd Avenue, Horace Harding Expressway (QM8 only)
QM8	Downtown; Frankfort Street and Pearl Street (last drop-off); Pearl Street and Peck Slip (first pick-up)	← AM → PM	Glen Oaks; 260th Street and Union Turnpike	Water Street, Church Street	Union Turnpike, 188th Street; 73rd Avenue, Horace Harding Expressway (QM8 only)
QM8 Super Express	Downtown; Water St at Wall St	← AM → PM	Glen Oaks; 260th Street and Union Turnpike	Water St, South St (outbound); Pearl St, Water St, Church St, Park Row (inbound)	Union Turnpike, 188th Street; 73rd Avenue, Horace Harding Expressway (QM8 only)
QM10	Midtown; 57th Street and Sixth Avenue (last drop-off); 34th Street and Third Avenue (first pick-up)	← AM → PM	Rego Park; 57th Avenue and Junction Boulevard (last drop-off); 63rd Road and 98th Place (first pick-up, QM10); Queens Boulevard and Ascan Avenue (first pick-up, QM11)	34th Street, Sixth Avenue, 57th Street	63rd Road, 57th Avenue
QM11	Downtown; Frankfort Street and Pearl Street (last drop-off); Pearl Street and Peck Slip (first pick-up)	← AM → PM	Rego Park; 57th Avenue and Junction Boulevard (last drop-off); 63rd Road and 98th Place (first pick-up, QM10); Queens Boulevard and Ascan Avenue (first pick-up, QM11)	Water Street, Church Street	Queens Boulevard, 63rd Road, 57th Avenue
QM12	Midtown; 57th Street and Sixth Avenue (last drop-off); 34th Street and Third Avenue (first pick-up)	← AM → PM	Forest Hills; Crescent Apartments (last drop-off); Metropolitan Avenue and 71st Road (first pick-up)	34th Street, Sixth Avenue, 57th Street	Yellowstone Boulevard
QM15	Midtown; 57th Street and Sixth Avenue (last drop-off); 34th Street and Third Avenue (first pick-up)	↔	Howard Beach; 157th Avenue and 102nd Street or Arverne Beach 54th Street and Beach Channel Drive or Lindenwood Cross Bay Boulevard and 157th Avenue	34th Street, Sixth Avenue, 57th Street	Woodhaven Boulevard, 155th Avenue, 157th Avenue, Cross Bay Boulevard (all trips), Rockaway Beach Blvd, Beach Channel Drive (Arverne trips only)
QM16	Midtown; 57th Street and Sixth Avenue (last drop-off); 34th Street and Third Avenue (first pick-up)	← AM → PM	Jacob Riis Park	34th Street, Sixth Avenue, 57th Street	Cross Bay Boulevard, Rockaway Beach Boulevard
QM17	Midtown; 57th Street and Sixth Avenue (last drop-off); 34th Street and Third Avenue (first pick-up)	← AM → PM	Far Rockaway; Beach 21st Street and Mott Avenue at Far Rockaway-Mott Avenue ( train)	34th Street, Sixth Avenue, 57th Street	Cross Bay Boulevard, Beach Channel Drive, Seagirt Boulevard
QM18	Midtown; 57th Street and Sixth Avenue (last drop-off); 34th Street and Third Avenue (first pick-up)	← AM → PM	South Ozone Park; 130th Street and 150th Avenue	34th Street, Sixth Avenue, 57th Street	Queens Boulevard, Lefferts Boulevard, 135th Avenue
QM20	Midtown; 57th Street and Third Avenue (last drop-off); 36th Street and Sixth Avenue (first pick-up)	↔	Bay Terrace; 211th Street and 18th Avenue (last drop-off); Corporal Kennedy Street and 23rd Avenue (first pick-up)	34th Street, Sixth Avenue; 57th Street (inbound); 59th Street (outbound)	Willets Point Boulevard, Utopia Parkway, 26th Avenue
QM20 Super Express	Midtown; 35th Street and Sixth Avenue	→ PM	Bay Terrace; 211th Street and 18th Avenue (last drop-off); Corporal Kennedy Street and 23rd Avenue (first pick-up)	34th Street, Sixth Avenue, 36th Street	Willets Point Boulevard, Utopia Parkway, 26th Avenue
QM21	Midtown; East 23rd Street and Park Avenue	← AM → PM	Rochdale Village; Guy R Brewer Boulevard and 130th Avenue (last drop-off); Bedell Street & 127 Avenue (first pick-up)	23rd Street, Madison Avenue, 57th Street	Queens Boulevard, Linden Boulevard, Guy R. Brewer Boulevard
QM24	Midtown; 57th Street and Sixth Avenue (last drop-off); 34th Street and Third Avenue (first pick-up)	← AM → PM	Glendale; Myrtle Avenue and 73rd Street	34th Street, Sixth Avenue, 57th Street	Eliot Avenue, Fresh Pond Road
QM25	Downtown; Frankfort Street and Pearl Street (last drop-off); Pearl Street and Peck Slip (first pick-up)	← AM → PM	Glendale; Myrtle Avenue and 73rd Street	Church Street, Water Street	Eliot Avenue, Fresh Pond Road, Myrtle Avenue
QM31	Midtown; 55th Street and Third Avenue (last drop-off); 38th Street and Third Avenue (first pick-up)	← AM → PM	Fresh Meadows; 188th Street & 64th Avenue	Third Avenue	Union Turnpike, 188th Street
QM32	Midtown; 55th Street and Third Avenue (last drop-off); 38th Street and Third Avenue (first pick-up)	← AM → PM	Bay Terrace; Bay Terrace Shopping Center	Third Avenue	Whitestone Expressway service road, Cross Island Parkway service road. Three AM rush hour trips run northbound to Bay Terrace.
QM34	Midtown; 55th Street and Third Avenue (last drop-off); 38th Street and Third Avenue (first pick-up)	← AM → PM	Glendale; Myrtle Avenue and 73rd Street	Third Avenue	Eliot Avenue, Fresh Pond Road, Myrtle Avenue
QM35	Midtown; 55th Street and Third Avenue (last drop-off); 38th Street and Third Avenue (first pick-up)	← AM → PM	Glen Oaks; 260th Street and Union Turnpike	Third Avenue	Union Turnpike, 73rd Avenue, Horace Harding Expressway
QM36	Midtown; 55th Street and Third Avenue (last drop-off); 38th Street and Third Avenue (first pick-up)	← AM → PM	Lake Success; North Shore Towers	Third Avenue	Union Turnpike, Lakeville Road
QM40	Midtown; 55th Street and Third Avenue (last drop-off); 38th Street and Third Avenue (first pick-up)	← AM → PM	Rego Park; 57th Avenue and Junction Boulevard (last drop-off); 63rd Road and 98th Place (first pick-up)	Third Avenue	63rd Road, 57th Avenue
QM42	Midtown; 55th Street and Third Avenue (last drop-off); 38th Street and Third Avenue (first pick-up)	← AM → PM	Forest Hills; Crescent Apartments (last drop-off); Metropolitan Avenue and 71st Road (first pick-up)	Third Avenue	Yellowstone Boulevard
QM44	Midtown; 55th Street and Third Avenue (last drop-off); 38th Street and Third Avenue (first pick-up)	← AM → PM	Electchester; 164th Street and Horace Harding Expressway	Third Avenue	Jewel Avenue
QM63	East Midtown; East 23rd Street and 1st Avenue	← AM → PM	Rosedale; 149th Avenue and 253rd Street	East 23rd Street; Madison Avenue (outbound); Fifth Avenue (inbound); East 57th Street; Third Avenue (inbound)	Linden Boulevard, Merrick Boulevard, Francis Lewis Boulevard
QM64	East Midtown; East 23rd Street and 1st Avenue	← AM → PM	Elmont, Nassau County; Elmont Road and Dutch Broadway	East 23rd Street; Madison Avenue (outbound); Fifth Avenue (inbound); East 57th Street; Third Avenue (inbound)	Liberty Avenue, Farmers Boulevard, Linden Boulevard
QM65	'Downtown; Frankfort Street and Pearl Street (last drop-off); Pearl Street and Peck Slip (first pick-up)	← AM → PM	Laurelton; 233rd Street and Merrick Boulevard	Church Street, Water Street	Linden Boulevard, Guy R. Brewer Boulevard, Baisley Boulevard, Bedell Street, Farmers Boulevard, Merrick Boulevard
QM68	East Midtown; East 57th Street and 3rd Avenue	← AM → PM	Floral Park; Hillside Avenue and 267th Street	East 23rd Street; Madison Avenue (outbound); Fifth Avenue (inbound); East 57th Street; Third Avenue (inbound)	Hillside Avenue

=== History and notes ===
Routes	History
QM1 QM31	Operates during rush hours only, off peak service available via QM5; Began service on February 26, 1968; Operated by Steinway Transit 1968-1985, Queens/Steinway Transit Corp. 1985-1988, and Queens Surface Corporation from 1998-2005; Downtown trips re-designated QM7 in June 2010; Off-peak service discontinued on in December 2015; Third Avenue service re-labeled QM31 in September 2016
QM2 QM32	Began service on June 9, 1969.; Operated by Queens Transit from 1969-1988 and Queens Surface Corporation 1988-2005; Weekend service via Mitchell Gardens began in 1994; Weekend service rerouted to Parsons Boulevard in April 2014; Queens-bound service rerouted to 59th Street in August 2015; Third Avenue service re-labeled QM32 in September 2016
QM4 QM44	Operated by Queens Transit 1971-1988 and Queens Surface Corporation 1988-2005; Third Avenue service relabeled to QM44 in July 2016
QM5 QM35	Bypasses Fresh Meadows during rush hours in the peak direction; Operated by Steinway Transit 1968-1985, Queens/Steinway Transit Corp. 1985-1988, and Queens Surface Corporation 1988-2005; Formerly part of the QM1A, re-designated June 2010; Downtown trips re-designated QM8 in June 2010; Third Avenue service relabeled QM35 in September 2016
QM6 QM36	Operated by Steinway Transit from 1968-1988 and Queens Surface Corporation 1988-2005; Formerly part of the QM1A, re-designated in June 2010; Third Avenue service relabeled QM36 in September 2016; Overnight QM6 service began on May 6, 2020 due to the subway shutdown caused by the COVID-19 pandemic, making QM18 stops along Queens Boulevard as well as a pick-up at Woodhaven Boulevard & Hoffman Drive, and a drop-off at Queens Boulevard & Woodhaven Boulevard.; Overnight service discontinued on June 28, 2020 due to low ridership.
QM7 QM8	QM7 operates from Fresh Meadows, QM8 operates from Glen Oaks and bypasses Fresh Meadows; QM8 AM "Super Express" service serves Fresh Meadows; Operated by Steinway Transit 1978-1988, Caravan Transit 1988-1990, and Queens Surface Corporation 1990-2005; Formerly part of the QM1/QM1A, re-designated in June 2010
QM10 QM11 QM40	Formerly operated by Triboro Coach; Downtown service relabeled QM11 in 1971; Third Avenue service relabeled QM40 in September 2016
QM12 QM42	Formerly operated by Triboro Coach; Stops east of 71st Avenue in Forest Hills discontinued in January 2011; Elmhurst stops added and route rerouted to Woodhaven Boulevard in July 2016; Midday service reduced from Summer 2010 to Winter 2012; Third Avenue service relabeled QM42 in September 2016; Truncated to Metropolitan Av/71 Av from Union T’pike/71 Av on June 29th, 2025
QM15	Operates via Lindenwood between Howard Beach and Ozone Park via 157th Avenue; Off-peak service terminates at 157th Avenue and 92nd Street; No Sunday service; Nicknamed "Shopper's Special"; Began service under Green Lines in 1970; Saturday service added July 1979; With the discontinuation of the JFK Express on April 15, 1990, which was also used by residents of Howard Beach to commute into Manhattan, service was extended from 157th Avenue and 84th Street to 159th Avenue and 102nd Street. A new stop was also added at 157th Avenue and Cross Bay Boulevard. The change was made at the request of Queens Borough President Claire Shulman.; Temporarily extended to Arverne from January 6, 2025 for the Rockaway Line rehabilitation project. Extension was extended until March 2026 due to community organization for a pilot project. Free Saturday QM15 shuttle service ran between Arverne and Lindenwood on Saturdays from 8:30 AM to 1:30 PM from January 2025 to September 2026. Extension made permanent on September 6, 2026, with these changes: all Saturday QM15 trips will run between Manhattan and Beach Channel Dr/Beach 54th St with no transfer required. All weekday evening QM15 trips toward Queens departing Manhattan starting at 8:15 PM will also be extended to Beach Channel Dr/Beach 54th St. Weekday daytime QM15 service will no longer be extended to Arverne. The first and last stop on weekday daytime QM15 trips will be 157th Ave/Cross Bay Blvd or 102nd St/157th Ave.
QM16 QM17	Formerly operated by Green Lines; QM16 service began April 12, 1971, QM17 service began December 20, 1976; Stops north of 157th Avenue in Howard Beach eliminated in July 2006; QM16 extended from Rockaway Park to Neponsit on September 4, 2007, then Roxbury at Fort Tilden on April 18, 2011, then truncated to Jacob Riis Park in December 2011 to accommodate customer parking; QM17 overnight service began on May 6, as a result of the subway shutdown caused by the COVID-19 pandemic, operating in both directions; discontinued on June 28, 2020 due to low ridership.; QM17 overnight service made daytime QM15 stops along Cross Bay Boulevard & Woodhaven Boulevard
QM18	Began service under Green Bus Lines around 1975; On July 8, 1986, Community Board 9 formally recommended extending the route from Liberty Avenue to 150th Avenue in South Ozone Park. The Board had denied the request by Green Bus Lines on February 18 because some of its members feared that the additional riders using the route would overcrowd the buses. The Board only approved the change after the company added new buses to the route. The change was made so that passengers traveling by bus from 150th Avenue to Manhattan would not have to pay two fares.; Extended along 135th Avenue in Spring 2008
QM20	No weekend service; Began service on July 7, 1970, originally operated on QM2 route north/west of Utopia Parkway; Operated by Queens Transit 1970-1988, Queens Surface Corporation 1988-2005; Queens-bound service rerouted to 59th Street in August 2015; Renumbered from QM2A in September 2011
QM21	Formerly operated by Jamaica Buses; Began service June 21, 1971.
QM24 QM25 QM34	Began service June 6, 1988; Formerly operated by Triboro Coach; Rerouted to Sixth Avenue in Spring 2011; Downtown service relabeled from QM24W to QM25 in June 2010; Third Avenue service relabeled QM34 in July 2016
QM63	Began service October 18, 1971 as Q20X; Renumbered to X20 in 1976 and to current number on April 15, 1990.; Prefix changed to QM and route streamlined in Rosedale on June 30, 2025.
QM64	Began service October 18, 1971 as Q24X; Renumbered to X24 in 1976 and current number on April 15, 1990.; Prefix changed to QM and route extended to Elmont in Nassau County on June 30, 2025.
QM65	Began service on June 30, 2025.; Route was heavily requested by residents of Laurelton since the 1970s.
QM68	Began service on August 2, 1971 as the Q18X, the first NYCT express service between Queens and Manhattan. Service initially ran between Hillside Avenue and 267th Street and 23rd Street and Broadway. Buses would run every 15 minutes between 7 a.m. and 7:45 a.m. from Queens, and every 15 minutes from 24th Street and Madison Avenue in the evening between 4:30 p.m. and 5:15 p.m.. Buses would run express along Queens Boulevard and the Queensboro Bridge.; Renumbered to X18 in 1976 and current number on April 15, 1990.; Some AM peak trips terminate at East 57th Street and 3rd Avenue, operating via Madison Avenue; Overnight service began on May 6, 2020 due to the overnight subway shutdown caused by the COVID-19 pandemic; discontinued on June 28, 2020 due to low ridership.; On September 30, 2024, the last stop for Floral Park-bound service was moved from 268th Street to 267th Street.; Prefix changed to QM and additional patterns in Midtown discontinued on June 30, 2025.

In December 2019, the MTA released a draft redesign of the Queens bus network redesign with 77 routes. The routes were given a "QMT" label to avoid confusion with existing routes. The "QMT" prefix was tentative; in the final plan, all bus routes would have been labeled with "QM", similar to the existing routes. The final redesign was initially expected in mid- or late 2020, but the first draft attracted overwhelmingly negative feedback, with 11,000 comments about the plans. The redesign was delayed due to the COVID-19 pandemic in New York City. Planning resumed in mid-2021.

The original draft plan was dropped, and a revised plan with 85 routes was released on March 29, 2022. The new plan retains the "QM" prefix and preserves most of the existing routes. Most of the bus routes have relatively minor changes:

- The X63, X64, and X68 was renamed the QM63, QM64, and QM68 respectively.
- One new express route was introduced: the QM65 from Lower Manhattan to Laurelton. This route is operated by MTA Bus.
- The QM3 was eliminated due to low ridership.
- The QM10 and QM40 were to be eliminated and absorbed into the QM11, QM12, and QM42. This was withdrawn in the Proposed Final Plan.

In the second draft plan, all Queens-bound express buses were supposed to use the Long Island Expressway; some of the existing routes used Queens Boulevard or Northern Boulevard. This change was reversed in the final plan, released in December 2023.

Phase 1 changes were implemented on June 29–30, 2025. The QM15–QM18, QM24–QM25, and QM34 changes took place on September 2, 2025.

== Manhattan to the Bronx ==
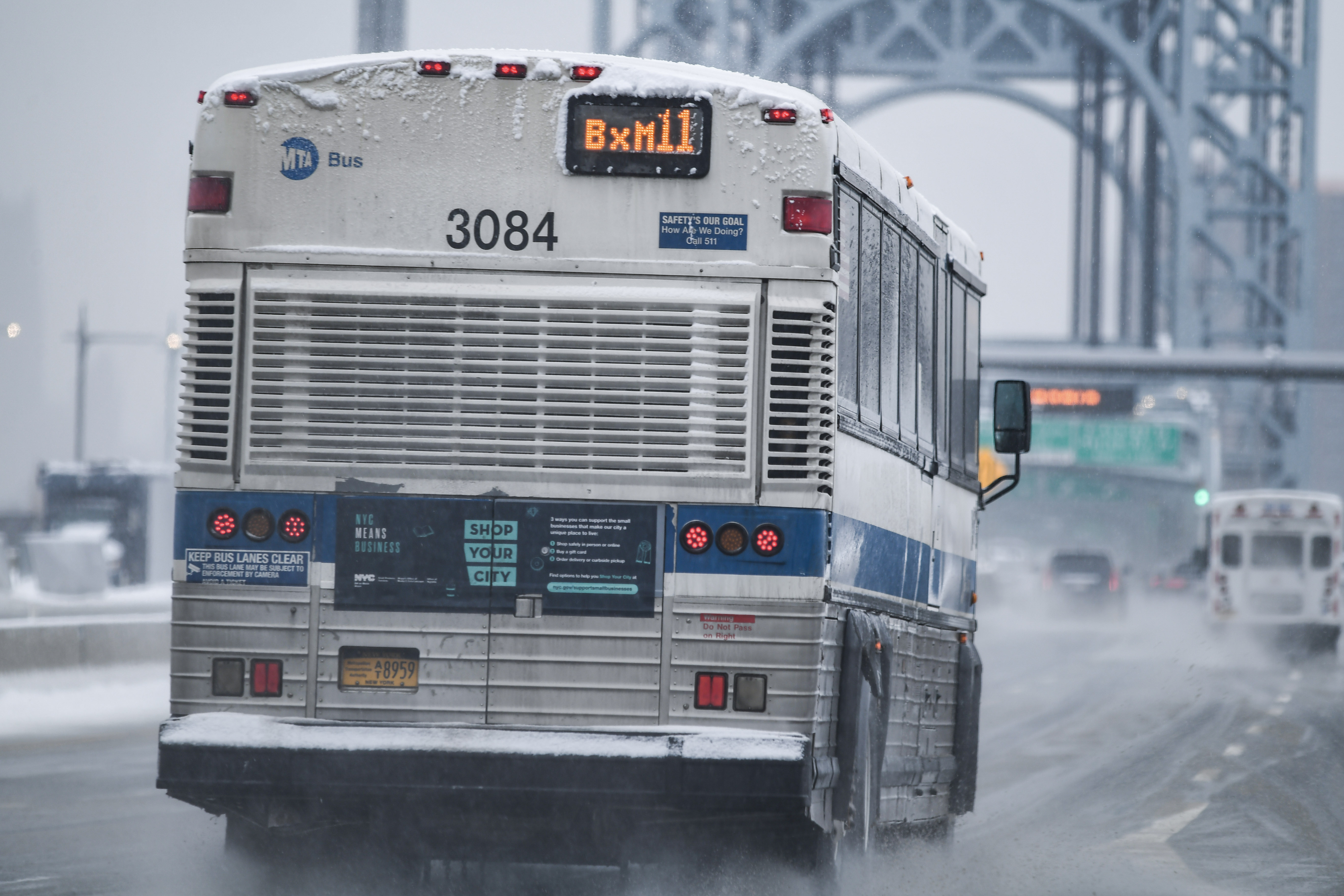
A BxM11 bus on the Robert F. Kennedy Bridge in 2021

All routes are operated by MTA Bus.

Route	Manhattan terminal		Bronx terminal	Manhattan streets traveled	Via	Bronx streets traveled
BxM1	East Midtown; Lexington Avenue and 34th Street (last drop-off); Third Avenue and 33rd Street (first pick-up)	↔	Riverdale; Riverdale Avenue and 263rd Street (last drop-off); Riverdale Avenue and 261st Street (first pick-up)	Third Avenue (northbound); Lexington Avenue (southbound)	Harlem River Drive	Broadway (select BxM1 trips); 230th Street, Kappock Street, Henry Hudson Parkway, Riverdale Avenue
BxM2	West Midtown; Seventh Avenue and 34th Street (last drop-off); Sixth Avenue and 35th Street (first pick-up)	↔	Riverdale; Riverdale Avenue and 263rd Street (last drop-off); Riverdale Avenue and 261st Street (first pick-up)	Sixth Avenue, Madison Avenue (northbound); Seventh Avenue, Fifth Avenue (southbound)	Deegan Expressway	Broadway (select BxM1 trips); 230th Street, Kappock Street, Henry Hudson Parkway, Riverdale Avenue
BxM3	Midtown; Fifth Avenue and 27th Street (last drop-off); Madison Avenue and 29th Street (first pick-up)	↔	Yonkers; Getty Square	Madison Avenue (northbound); Fifth Avenue (southbound	Deegan Expressway	Sedgwick Avenue, Broadway, South Broadway
BxM4	Midtown; Fifth Avenue and 27th Street (last drop-off); Madison Avenue and 29th Street (first pick-up)	↔	Woodlawn; Katonah Avenue and 242nd Street	Madison Avenue (northbound); Fifth Avenue (southbound	Madison Avenue Bridge	Grand Concourse, Jerome Avenue
BxM6	Midtown; Madison Avenue and 23rd Street	↔	Parkchester; Metropolitan Oval	Madison Avenue, Third Avenue (northbound); Fifth Avenue (southbound)	Bruckner Expressway	East 177th Street, Metropolitan Avenue
BxM7	Midtown; Madison Avenue and 23rd Street	↔	Co-op City, Bronx; Dreiser Loop	Madison Avenue, Third Avenue (northbound); Fifth Avenue (southbound)	Bruckner Expressway	Hutchinson River Parkway East, Co-Op City Boulevard
BxM8	Midtown; Madison Avenue and 23rd Street	↔	Pelham Bay Park; Pelham Bay Park Station ( trains)	Madison Avenue, Third Avenue (northbound); Fifth Avenue (southbound)	Bruckner Expressway	Westchester Avenue, Bruckner Boulevard; City Island Avenue (select trips)
BxM8	Midtown; Madison Avenue and 23rd Street	← AM → PM	City Island; Rochelle Street and City Island Avenue	Madison Avenue, Third Avenue (northbound); Fifth Avenue (southbound)	Bruckner Expressway	Westchester Avenue, Bruckner Boulevard; City Island Avenue (select trips)
BxM9	Midtown; Madison Avenue and 23rd Street	↔	Throgs Neck; Layton Avenue and Clarence Avenue (last drop-off); Layton Avenue and Vincent Avenue (first pick-up)	Madison Avenue, Third Avenue (northbound); Fifth Avenue (southbound)	Bruckner Expressway	Randall Avenue, Harding Avenue; Throgs Neck Boulevard (outbound); Clarence Avenue (inbound)
BxM10	Midtown; Madison Avenue and 23rd Street	↔	Baychester; Eastchester Road and Boston Road (last drop-off); Eastchester Road and Tillotson Avenue (first pick-up)	Madison Avenue, Third Avenue (northbound); Fifth Avenue (southbound)	Bruckner Expressway	Morris Park Avenue, Eastchester Road
BxM11	Midtown; East 26th Street and Madison Avenue	↔	Wakefield; 241st Street Station ( train)	Madison Avenue (northbound); Fifth Avenue (southbound	Bruckner Expressway	Boston Road, White Plains Road
BxM18	Lower Manhattan; Broadway and Battery Place (last drop-off); Battery Place and Greenwich Street (first pick-up)	← AM → PM	Riverdale; Riverdale Avenue and West 263rd Street	Church Street, Sixth Avenue, and Madison Avenue (northbound); Fifth Avenue, Broadway (southbound)	Deegan Expressway	230th Street, Kappock Street, Henry Hudson Parkway, Riverdale Avenue

=== History and notes ===
Former Liberty Lines Express routes were taken over by MTA Bus Company on January 3, 2005, while former New York Bus Service routes were taken over on July 1, 2005.

Route	History
BxM1	Select weekday trips operate nonstop via Major Deegan Expressway, bypassing Inwood; Some AM trips may be Super Express, operating via Riverdale Av rather than Kappock St, these trips also bypass Inwood, it is unknown if these trips are signed up as "BXM1 SUPER EXPRESS"; Began service on August 19, 1968, operated by Riverdale Transit Corp. 1968-1984, then Liberty Lines Express 1984-2005; Overnight service began on May 6, 2020 due to the overnight subway shutdown caused by the COVID-19 pandemic; discontinued on June 28, 2020 due to low ridership.
BxM2	Some AM Rush Hour trips either operates the regular route via Kappock St or via Riverdale Av; Began service on August 19, 1968; Operated by Riverdale Transit Corp. until 1984, then Liberty Lines Express 1984-2005; Overnight service began on May 6, 2020 due to the overnight subway shutdown caused by the COVID-19 pandemic; discontinued on June 28, 2020 due to low ridership.; Drop-off stop at 5th Avenue and 94th Street discontinued, in addition, one new pick-up and drop-off stops added in Harlem at Madison Av-123 St and 5 Av-125 St, respectively, on March 31st, 2024.; Service will be rerouted from the Major Deegan Expressway to operate via Inwood and the Henry Hudson Parkway to serve West Midtown as part of a redesign of the Bronx bus system.
BxM3	Began service in 1970; Operated by Riverdale Transit Corp. until 1984, then Liberty Lines Express 1984-2005; Last Stop for pick up towards Yonkers is available at 123rd Street and Madison Avenue in Harlem.
BxM4	Began service October 30, 1972; Operated by Riverdale Transit Corp. as the BxM4B until 1984, then Liberty Lines Express 1984-2005; Relabeled to BxM4 when Bedford Park service (BxM4A) was discontinued in June 2010; Last Stop for pick up towards Woodlawn is available at 123rd Street and Madison Avenue in Harlem.
BxM6	Began service August 24, 1970, operated by New York Bus Service until 2005
BxM7	To Manhattan via Sections 1-2-3-4-5 in Co-op City; from Manhattan via sections 5-4-3-2-1 in Co-op City; During AM rush hours, service is divided up so certain trips only serve only one or two sections before continuing to Manhattan, Most but not all trips serving both Drieser and Carver Loops follow this particular service.; AM Rush hour Trips may originate at Bellamy Loop or Einstein Loop to provide service on Bartow Av and Sections 4-5; Began service on January 18, 1971, operated by New York Bus Service until 2005; Wall Street Express service ended in 1987; downtown service from Co-op City via Whitestone Expressway, Queens-Midtown Tunnel and FDR drive was proposed briefly as the BxM17 in June 2019 as part of the Bronx bus redesign draft plan.; Overnight service began on May 6, 2020 due to the overnight subway shutdown caused by the COVID-19 pandemic; makes all BxM8 stops along Bruckner Boulevard during overnight hours.; Pick Up and Drop Off stops added on 5 Av-97 St and 3 Av-97 St in March 2024
BxM8	Two peak-direction trips serve are extended to City Island to replace former BxM7B route; Pelham Bay service began January 10, 1972 as the BxM7A; City Island service began January 7, 1980 as the BxM7B; Operated by New York Bus Service until 2005; Services (BxM7A/BxM7B) were combined and renumbered BxM8 in September 2011.; During weekday peak periods only, service along Westchester Avenue, Crosby Avenue, and Jarvis Avenue will be discontinued for City Island trips as part of a redesign of the Bronx bus system.
BxM9	Began service on August 2, 1976, operated by New York Bus Service until 2005
BxM10	Began service on January 7, 1980, operated by New York Bus Service until 2005; Off-peak and weekend BxM10 service will operate via Hugh J. Grant Circle to serve current BxM6 customers who will no longer have off-peak and weekend service as part of a redesign of the Bronx bus system.
BxM11	A few early morning trips originate at Gun Hill Rd/White Plains Rd instead of Wakefield.; One AM Rush Hour trip operates nonstop after Gun Hill Rd, bypassing Burke Avenue, Allerton Avenue, Pelham Parkway and the Bronx Zoo entirely before continuing to Manhattan.; Began service on April 26, 1971, operated by Pelham Parkway Express until 1984, then Liberty Lines Express 1984-2005; Overnight service began on May 6, 2020 due to the overnight subway shutdown caused by the COVID-19 pandemic; discontinued on June 28, 2020 due to low ridership.; The BxM11 routing will change to operate from East 233 Street via Bronxwood Avenue and Boston Rd to existing BxM11 non-stop routing to Midtown as part of a redesign of the Bronx bus system. Service along Nereid Avenue will be provided by the new BxM5. Service along White Plains Road will continue to be provided by the subway.
BxM18	First drop-off and last pickup in Manhattan is 56 St on 5 Av-56 St (southbound) and Madison Av-56 St (northbound); This is the only Bronx express route to make no stops north of 56 St while other routes operate regularly above 56 St; Stops at 5th Avenue and 35th Street (southbound) and Madison Avenue and 56th Street (northbound) for transfers from/to other Queens and Bronx express buses; Began service on September 11, 1978 operated Liberty Lines Express (along with New York City Transit's X61 route); Service will be rerouted from the Major Deegan Expressway and 5th Avenue to operate via Inwood and the Henry Hudson Parkway to serve Hudson Yards and Downtown as part of a redesign of the Bronx bus system.

== Manhattan intra-borough ==
Route	Terminals			Primary streets traveled	Notes
X80	Randall's Island; Icahn Stadium	← (before events) ---------- → (after events)	Harlem; 125th Street and Lexington Avenue at 125th Street ( trains)	Robert F. Kennedy Bridge	Operated by MTA New York City Transit; Special event service only, fares collected only for travel to Randall's Island; M35 local bus service available full-time

== Former routes ==
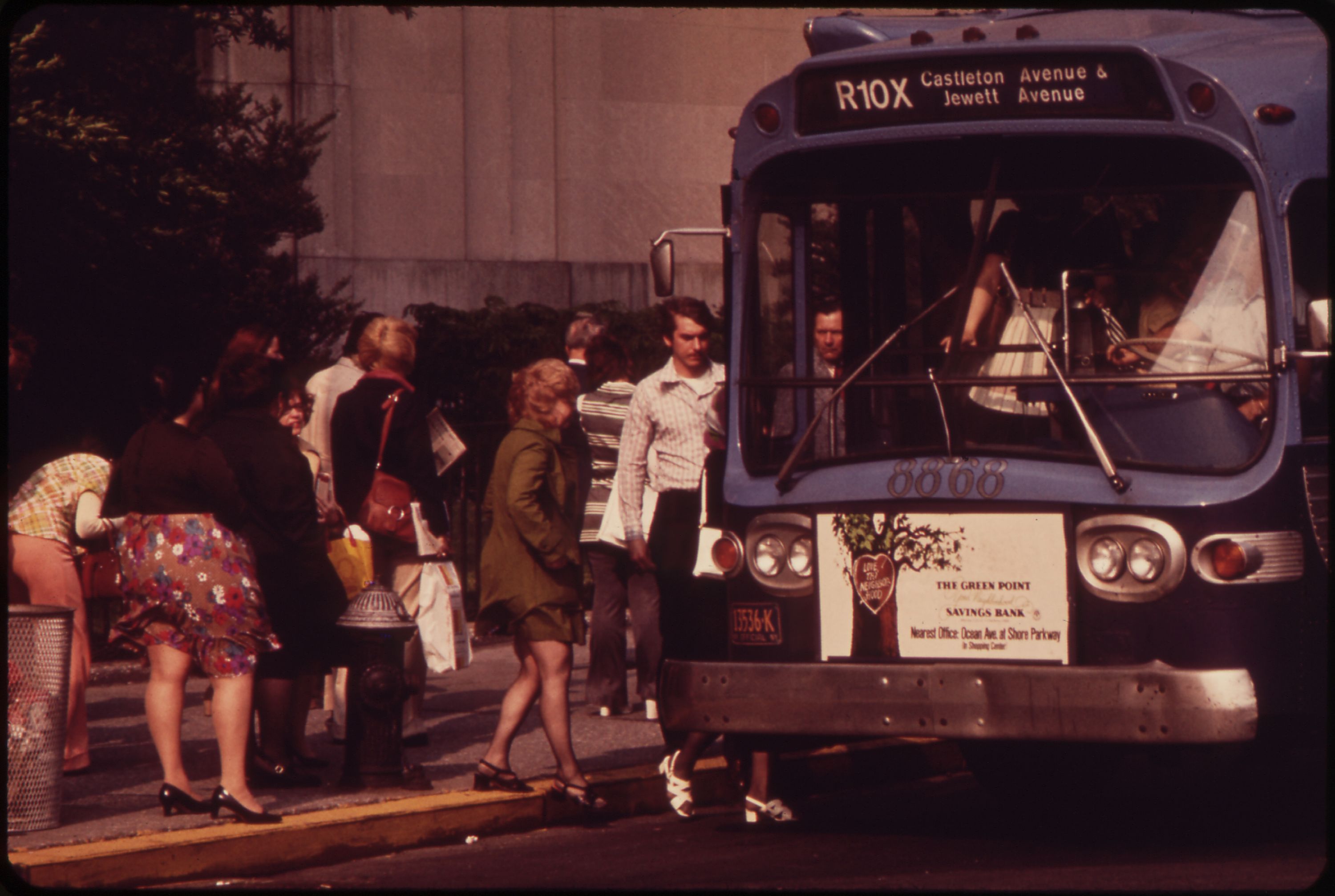
R10X bus boarding passengers in Lower Manhattan, May 1973

=== New York City Transit ===
==== Staten Island Express routes ====
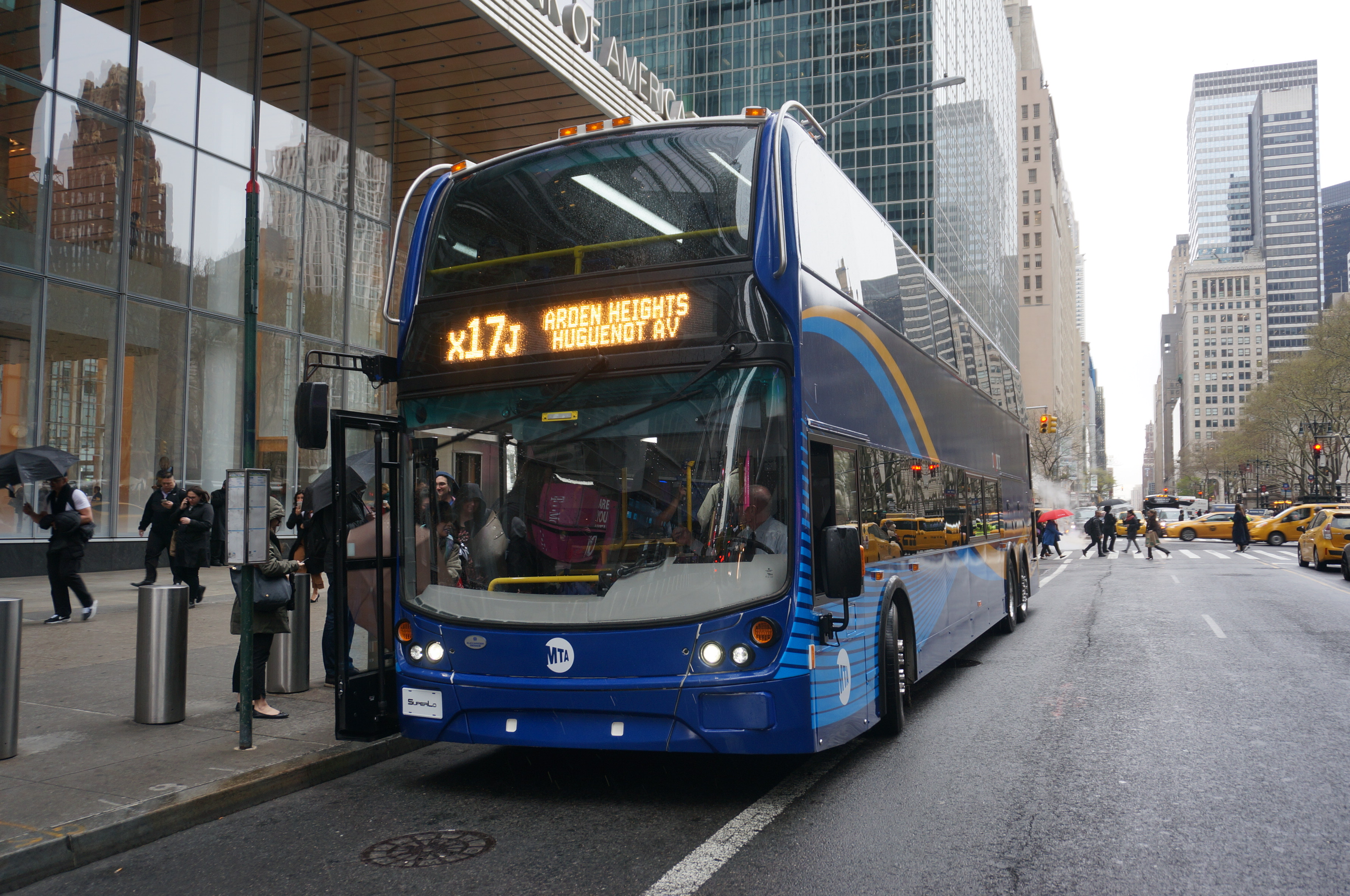
An Alexander Dennis Enviro500 demonstrator bus on X17J route in 2018

Most X routes were discontinued between 2010 and 2018 due to budget cuts and a reimagining of the bus network.

In 2015, the MTA began a comprehensive study of express bus lines on Staten Island. These lines had not been drastically changed since the 1980s, and were updated piece-by-piece. As a result, these routes were circuitous, redundant, and infrequent. The MTA proposed replacing all of the existing express bus routes with simpler and shorter variants, a proposal supported by 76% of Staten Island residents who had learned about the study. In March 2018, after hosting several meetings with Staten Island residents, the MTA announced that express bus service to Staten Island was expected to be completely reorganized in August 2018. As part of the redesign, all of the existing bus routes would be discontinued and replaced with new routes with a "SIM" prefix on August 19, 2018. The "SIM" prefix was chosen to reduce confusion with the "X"-prefixed routes they replaced, but deviate from the "S" prefix used by local Staten Island bus routes. The routes that were discontinued prior to August 18, 2018 were: X6, X13, X16, X18, X20, X21 (first use), and X30 (first use).

The remaining X routes were expected to be revamped and renamed sometime between 2019 and 2021, but it was later changed to when the rest of the boroughs got their own Bus Network Redesign; the three remaining X-routes in Queens were changed to QM on June 29, 2025 with the Queens Redesign, and the final four in Brooklyn will change with the Brooklyn Redesign in the future.

Route	Terminals		Streets Traveled	History and Notes
Route	Manhattan	Staten Island	Streets Traveled	History and Notes
R9X	Service began in December 1968, and later became the X9 in 1976. See below for more information.			
R10X	Service began in 1970, and later became the X10 in 1976. See below for more information.			
R13X	Service began in 1972, and later became the X13 in 1976. See below for more information.			
R14X	Service began in 1973, and later became the X14 in 1976. See below for more information.			
R17X	Service began in 1973, and later became the X17 in 1976. See below for more information.			
X1*	Midtown; Central Park South and 7th Avenue	Eltingville Transit Center	6th Avenue (NB), 5th Avenue, Broadway (SB), Hylan Boulevard, Richmond Avenue	Daily service. Operated all times. Peak-hour service started/ended at 23rd Street in Manhattan.; In March 2000, it was announced that off-peak and weekend X1, X10, and X17 service would run directly out of the Brooklyn Battery Tunnel onto Greenwich Street and Trinity Place instead of looping via West Street, Battery Place, Greenwich Street, and Trinity Place, as was done by peak period service. The reroute would eliminate three left turns and the need to travel through two traffic lights. While making the loop normally took about five minutes, it could take 15 minutes or longer under heavy traffic congestion. Service to the Greenwich Street and Battery Place bus stop, used by only 0.5 percent of all weekend riders, would be discontinued. The changes, which were to be implemented in June 2000, were estimated to save $25,000 a year.; In July 2000, the MTA announced plans to reroute northbound X1, X12, X27, X28, and X29 service during morning peak periods from running directly out of the Brooklyn Battery Tunnel onto Greenwich Street and Trinity Place to instead loop via West Street, Battery Place, Greenwich Street, and Trinity Place due to the planned extension of the Gowanus Expressway High-Occupancy Vehicle (HOV) Lane through the Brooklyn Battery Tunnel during the morning peak period between 6 a.m. and 10 a.m.. The change would be made since the extension of the HOV lane would prevent vehicles from moving between the left and right tubes within the toll plaza at the entrance to the tunnel, meaning buses using the HOV lane would no longer be able to exit on Trinity Place. To address the fact that the reroute would restore the congested through loop, MTA Bridges and Tunnels planned to place police officers and traffic agents at key locations to regulate traffic flow. The change, which would take effect in late July 2000, was expected to increase annual operating costs by $32,000.; Overnight express service started on January 20, 2013.; Originally numbered R13X in 1972, then X13 in 1976.
X2	Midtown; East 57th Street and 3rd Avenue	New Dorp; Mill Road and Ebbits Street	Madison Avenue (NB), Lexington Avenue (SB), 23rd Street, Hylan Boulevard	Peak service only. Bypassed Lower Manhattan via FDR Drive.
X3	Lower Manhattan; World Financial Center	New Dorp; Mill Road and Ebbits Street	Church Street (NB), Broadway (SB), Hylan Boulevard	Peak service only
X4	Lower Manhattan; World Financial Center	Eltingville Transit Center	Church Street (NB), Broadway (SB), Hylan Boulevard, Father Capodanno Boulevard, Hylan Boulevard, Richmond Avenue	Peak service only
X5	Midtown; East 57th Street and 3rd Avenue	Eltingville Transit Center	Madison Avenue (NB), Lexington Avenue (SB), 23rd Street, Father Capodanno Boulevard, Hylan Boulevard, Richmond Avenue	Peak service only. Bypassed Lower Manhattan via FDR Drive.
X6	Midtown; Central Park South and 7th Avenue	Eltingville Transit Center	Madison Avenue (NB), Fifth Avenue/Broadway (SB), Father Capodanno Boulevard, Hylan Boulevard, Richmond Avenue	Peak service only.; Discontinued on June 27, 2010 due to a budget crisis
X7	Midtown Manhattan; Central Park South and 7th Avenue	Eltingville Transit Center	6th Avenue (NB), 5th Avenue, Broadway (SB), Father Capodanno Boulevard, Hylan Boulevard, Nelson Avenue	Peak service only. Operated via West Street in Lower Manhattan.
X8	Financial District; Downtown Loop	Eltingville Transit Center	Church Street, Water Street, Father Capodanno Boulevard, Hylan Boulevard, Nelson Avenue	Peak service only
X9	Midtown; Central Park South and 7th Avenue	New Dorp; Mill Road and Ebbits Street	6th Avenue (NB), 5th Avenue, Broadway (SB), Hylan Boulevard	Peak service only; Operated via West Street in Lower Manhattan; Service started in December 1968 as the R9X.; The route was relabeled the X9 in 1976.
X10; X10B	Midtown; East 57th Street and 3rd Avenue	Port Richmond; Jewett Avenue and Castleton Avenue	6th Avenue, Madison Avenue (NB), 5th Avenue, Broadway (SB), Gannon Avenue, Richmond Avenue, Port Richmond Avenue	Daily service.; Peak hour trips (X10B) operated via West Street at World Financial Center in Lower Manhattan instead of Broadway and Church Street. Battery Park service replaced by X11.; Service on Narrows Road provided by the X14 during peak hours, when the X10 did not stop there.; Service began as the R10X on August 5, 1970, running between Castleton Avenue and Jewett Avenue and Broadway and Park Place. Buses left Staten Island at 7:30, 7:45, and 8 a.m., and left Manhattan at 4:45, 5, and 5:15 p.m.; Became X10 in 1976; In September 1994, two non-revenue trips were converted to revenue trips, providing one reverse commute trip in the AM from Manhattan and on in the PM to Manhattan to serve the College of Staten Island.; On January 17, 1998, an early Saturday morning trip toward Manhattan leaving Jewett at 6:30 a.m. was added. Service continued running hourly from 7:00 a.m. to 9 p.m.; In March 2000, it was announced that off-peak and weekend X1, X10, and X17 service would run directly out of the Brooklyn Battery Tunnel onto Greenwich Street and Trinity Place instead of looping via West Street, Battery Place, Greenwich Street, and Trinity Place, as was done by peak period service. The reroute would eliminate three left turns and the need to travel through two traffic lights. While making the loop normally took about five minutes, it could take 15 minutes or longer under heavy traffic congestion. Service to the Greenwich Street and Battery Place bus stop, used by only 0.5 percent of all weekend riders, would be discontinued. The time savings would allow off-peak (9:15 a.m. to 10:30 p.m. toward Manhattan, and from 8:20 a.m. to 4:00 p.m. and from 7:30 p.m. to 12:20 a.m. to Staten Island) and weekend X10 buses to serve four stops along Narrows Road in Staten Island which were only served in peak periods by the X13, X14, and X16. Buses would run along Narrows Road instead of the Staten Island Expressway between Clove Road and the Verrazano–Narrows Bridge toll plaza. The changes, which were to be implemented in June 2000, were estimated to save $25,000 a year.
X11	Tribeca; Worth Street and Broadway	Travis; Wild Avenue and Victory Boulevard	Church Street (NB), Broadway (SB), Gannon Avenue, Victory Boulevard	Peak service only; In February 1999, the MTA announced plans to extend the route along Victory Boulevard from Roswell Avenue to Wild Avenue, which was the terminal of the S62 and the S92. The extension was estimated to cost $5,000 a year, and was expected to generate $4,500 a year in revenue. The change would take effect in March 1999.
X12; X42	West Midtown; West 57th Street and 11th Avenue	Mariners Harbor; South Avenue and Richmond Terrace	57th Street, 6th Avenue, Madison Avenue (NB), 5th Avenue, Broadway (SB), Victory Boulevard, Watchogue Road, Port Richmond Avenue, Forest Avenue, South Avenue	Peak service only.; During the height of the rush hour, X12 trips ended at 23rd Street, while X42 trips acted as midtown super-express service (via the FDR Drive & 23rd Street instead of 6th Avenue/Broadway).; In July 2000, the MTA announced plans to reroute northbound X1, X12, X27, X28, and X29 service during morning peak periods from running directly out of the Brooklyn Battery Tunnel onto Greenwich Street and Trinity Place to instead loop via West Street, Battery Place, Greenwich Street, and Trinity Place due to the planned extension of the Gowanus Expressway High-Occupancy Vehicle (HOV) Lane through the Brooklyn Battery Tunnel during the morning peak period between 6 a.m. and 10 a.m.. The change would be made since the extension of the HOV lane would prevent vehicles from moving between the left and right tubes within the toll plaza at the entrance to the tunnel, meaning buses using the HOV lane would no longer be able to exit on Trinity Place. To address the fact that the reroute would restore the congested through loop, MTA Bridges and Tunnels planned to place police officers and traffic agents at key locations to regulate traffic flow. The change, which would take effect in late July 2000, was expected to increase annual operating costs by $32,000.; X42 service south of 23rd Street to Houston Street eliminated on April 12, 2004.
X12; X42	Madison Square; 23rd Street and 5th Avenue	Mariners Harbor; South Avenue and Richmond Terrace	57th Street, 6th Avenue, Madison Avenue (NB), 5th Avenue, Broadway (SB), Victory Boulevard, Watchogue Road, Port Richmond Avenue, Forest Avenue, South Avenue	
X13	Lower Manhattan; Water & Broad Street (AM), Trinity Place & Rector Street (PM)	Port Richmond; Castleton Avenue and Jewett Avenue	Church Street, Water Street, Clove Road, Forest Avenue, Port Richmond Avenue	In 2002, service was changed from operating to/from Worth Street/Broadway to operating along the Downtown Loop routing shared by the X15, X18, and X20.; Discontinued on June 27, 2010 due to budget crisis Downtown riders served by X14 buses making additional Downtown stops.
X14	West Midtown; West 57th Street and 11th Avenue	Port Richmond; Castleton Avenue and Jewett Avenue	Madison Avenue (NB), Fifth Avenue (SB), Water Street, Clove Road, Forest Avenue, Port Richmond Avenue	Originally the R8X to Downtown Brooklyn.; Originally R14X in 1973, then became X14 in 1976.; Peak service only
X15	Lower Manhattan; Downtown Loop	Eltingville Transit Center	Church Street (NB), Water Street (SB), Richmond Road, Arthur Kill Road	Peak service only
X16	Lower Manhattan; Worth Street and Broadway	Port Richmond; Castleton Avenue and Jewett Avenue	Church Street (NB), Broadway (SB), Victory Boulevard, Forest Avenue	Discontinued on June 27, 2010 due to budget crisis
X17A	Tribeca; Worth Street and Broadway	Annadale, Staten Island; Annadale Road and Drumgoole Road East	Church Street (NB), Broadway (SB), Richmond Avenue	Peak service only.; Replaced the X17C in the peak direction for downtown service to and from Annadale.; All X17 trips (A, C, and J) served the Eltingville Transit Center.; On June 1, 2009, afternoon trips were extended from Annadale Road and Drumgoole Road West to Annadale Road and Arthur Kill Road, adding three stops. The change was made to formalize the route and reduce confusion.
X17C	Midtown; East 57th Street and 3rd Avenue	Huguenot; Woodrow Road and Huguenot Avenue	6th Avenue, Madison Avenue (NB), 5th Avenue, Broadway (SB), Richmond Avenue, Drumgoole Road, Huguenot Avenue	Service began as the R17X on July 2, 1973, connecting Midtown and Lower Manhattan with the South Shore of Staten Island. Buses left every 15 minutes from Huguenot Avenue and Carlton Court to Broadway and Duane Street between 6:45 a.m. and 7:45 a.m.. Return buses left at 4:27, 4:40, 4:53, 5:06, and 5:26 p.m.. 13 stops were made on Staten Island. Service ran via Arden Avenue, Arthur Kill Rod, Richmond Avenue, Victory Boulevard, the Staten Island Expressway, the Verrazano-Narrows Bridge, Gowanus Expressway, the Brooklyn-Battery Tunnel, Church Street, Worth Street, and Broadway. Two buses left Staten Island at 6:55 a.m. and 7:20 a.m., heading nonstop to Third Avenue and 57th Street, returning leaving at 4:44 p.m. and 5:05 p.m.. These buses ran via the East River Drive, 42nd Street, Madison Avenue, 57th Street, and Third Avenue.; Became X17 in 1976; No service during peak hours in the peak direction; Peak direction service replaced by X17A, X17J, X19, X22, X22A, and X24 during these hours.; In March 2000, it was announced that off-peak and weekend X1, X10, and X17 service would run directly out of the Brooklyn Battery Tunnel onto Greenwich Street and Trinity Place instead of looping via West Street, Battery Place, Greenwich Street, and Trinity Place, as was done by peak period service. The reroute would eliminate three left turns and the need to travel through two traffic lights. While making the loop normally took about five minutes, it could take 15 minutes or longer under heavy traffic congestion. Service to the Greenwich Street and Battery Place bus stop, used by only 0.5 percent of all weekend riders, would be discontinued. The changes, which were to be implemented in June 2000, were estimated to save $25,000 a year.; In June 2001, the MTA announced plans to approve a plan to extend the span of weekday X17 service from 8:20 p.m. until 11:30 p.m. since the last two trips were almost at complete capacity, which suggested there was demand for later service. The change was scheduled to be implemented in September 2001. The service span increase was expected to cost $200,000 a year.; Weekends, all X17 trips served Bay Ridge, Brooklyn (to and from Manhattan only). This was done simultaneously with the introduction of Sunday service on September 30, 2012. Sunday service was made permanent in January 2014. Adding this service cost $300,000 annually.; All X17 trips (A, C, and J) served the Eltingville Transit Center.; Extended to Tottenville during off-peak weekdays via Outerbridge Park and Ride in January 2013.
X17C	Midtown; East 57th Street and 3rd Avenue	Tottenville; Page Avenue and Hylan Boulevard	6th Avenue, Madison Avenue (NB), 5th Avenue, Broadway (SB), Richmond Avenue, Drumgoole Road, Huguenot Avenue	
X17J	Midtown Manhattan; East 57th Street and 3rd Avenue	Huguenot; Woodrow Road and Huguenot Avenue	34th Street, Madison Avenue (NB), 5th Avenue, 42nd Street (SB), Richmond Avenue, Drumgoole Road, Huguenot Avenue	Peak service only.; Replaced the X17C in the peak direction for midtown Manhattan service.; Operated via the Lincoln Tunnel, New Jersey Turnpike and the Goethals Bridge; Created in 2000 as a result of NYCDOT planning studies; Formerly the Academy Bus Lines Richmond route, with some modifications; All X17 trips (A, C, and J) served the Eltingville Transit Center.
X18 (Second use)	Lower Manhattan; Water and Broad Street (AM) Trinity Place and Rector Street (PM)	Concord; Narrows Road and Targee Street (AM) Arrochar; School Road and Dennis Torricelli Street (PM)	Church Street, Water Street, Targee Street, Tompkins Avenue, Bay Street	Operated as Park Hill/Rosebank Loop. AM buses ran from Targee Street & DeKalb Street to Water Street & Broad Street. PM buses ran from Trinity Place & Rector Street to School Road & Dennis Torricelli Street.; Discontinued on June 27, 2010 due to budget crisis
X19	Tribeca; Worth Street and Broadway	Huguenot; Woodrow Road and Huguenot Avenue	Church Street (NB), Broadway (SB), Arden Avenue, Drumgoole Road, Huguenot Avenue	Peak service only.; Replaced the X17C in the peak direction for downtown service to and from Huguenot and Arden Heights.
X20 (Second use)	Lower Manhattan; Water Street and Broad Street (AM) Trinity Place and Rector Street (PM)	South Beach; Sand Lane and Father Capodanno Boulevard	Church Street, Water Street, Sand Lane, Steuben Street	On January 4, 2010, service was extended from its terminal at Father Capodano Boulevard and Seaview Avenue and rerouted to operate to a New York City Parks Department Park & Ride along Hylan Boulevard between Sand Lane and Narrows Road. The change was made to increase ridership on the route, which had capacity, to create a bidirectional route path and eliminate a confusing one-way loop, and to provide another express bus option for South Shore and South Beach residents.; Discontinued on June 27, 2010 due to a budget crisis.
X21 (First use)	Midtown Manhattan; 57th Street and 3rd Avenue	Pleasant Plains; Amboy Road and Bedell Street	34th Street, Madison Avenue (NB), Lexington Avenue, 23rd Street (SB), Rossville Avenue, Woodrow Road, Bloomingdale Road	Established in 2001 as a short-turn of the X22 with 3 trips each way.; Discontinued in 2002, and replaced by the X22 bus.
X21 (Second use)	Midtown; East 41 Street and 1st Avenue	Eltingville; Richmond Avenue and Hylan Boulevard	42nd Street, Arthur Kill Road, Richmond Avenue	Peak service only.; New super express route began service on September 2, 2014.
X22; X22A	Midtown; East 57th Street and 3rd Avenue	Tottenville; Page Avenue and Hylan Boulevard	34th Street, Madison Avenue (NB), 5th Avenue, 42nd Street (SB), Amboy Road, Bloomingdale Road	Peak service only; X22 bypassed Outerbridge Park and Ride except for a few PM trips; X22A originated at Tottenville and operated express between Outerbridge Park and Ride and Manhattan, stopping only at Arthur Kill Road and Victory Boulevard; Operated via the Lincoln Tunnel, New Jersey Turnpike and the Goethals Bridge; Created in 2000 as a result of NYCDOT planning studies; Formerly the Academy Bus Lines Amboy route; Outerbridge Park and Ride service added on July 5, 2011 to replace the AE7, with six AM trips beginning at Outerbridge and eight PM trips serving Outerbridge.; X22A service added on January 30, 2012 as a six-month trial, and later made permanent.
X22; X22A	Midtown; East 57th Street and 3rd Avenue	Pleasant Plains; Outerbridge Park and Ride	34th Street, Madison Avenue (NB), 5th Avenue, 42nd Street (SB), Amboy Road, Bloomingdale Road	
X23 (Second use)	Midtown Manhattan; East 59th Street and 5th Avenue	Huguenot; Huguenot Avenue and Amboy Road	34th Street, Madison Avenue (NB), 5th Avenue (SB), Woodrow Road, Foster Road, Huguenot Avenue	Peak service only; Began service on August 27, 2001, as a result of NYCDOT planning studies. Operated under city subsidy.; Formerly operated by Atlantic Express.; Taken over by Academy Bus in December 2013 following Atlantic Express filing for bankruptcy; temporarily only accepted cash following takeover.; Operated via the Lincoln Tunnel, New Jersey Turnpike and the Goethals Bridge
X24 (Second use)	Midtown; East 59th Street and 5th Avenue	New Dorp; Tysens Lane and Hylan Boulevard	34th Street, Madison Avenue (NB), 5th Avenue (SB), Huguenot Avenue, Arden Avenue, Hylan Boulevard	Peak service only; Began service on August 27, 2001, as a result of NYCDOT planning studies. Operated under city subsidy.; Formerly operated by Atlantic Express.; Renamed from Arden line.; Taken over by Academy Bus in December 2013; temporarily only accepted cash following takeover.; Operated via the Lincoln Tunnel, New Jersey Turnpike and the Goethals Bridge
X30 (First use)	Midtown; Third Avenue and East 57th Street (AM) Park Avenue and East 57th Street (PM)	Annadale; Amboy Road and Arden Avenue	Madison Avenue (NB), lexington Avenue (SB), 23rd Street, 57th Street, West Street, Rossville Avenue, Foster Road, Amboy Road	Peak service only; On April 23, 1991, the Mayor held a public hearing on a proposed resolution to approve the establishment of the X30 and X31 bus routes on a six-month pilot basis.; Began service on June 3, 1991.
X30 (Second use)	Midtown; West 57th Street and 11th Avenue	Sunnyside; Clove Road and Victory Boulevard	Madison Avenue (NB), 5th Avenue (SB), 42nd Street, 57th Street, Forest Avenue	Peak service only; Operated via the Lincoln Tunnel, New Jersey Turnpike and the Goethals Bridge; Formerly the Academy Bus Lines Forest route until June 22, 2001; began service under NYCT on September 10, 2001.
X31	Midtown; East 57th Street and 3rd Avenue	Eltingville Transit Center	34th Street, Madison Avenue (NB), 5th Avenue (SB), 42nd Street, Bradley Avenue, Harold Street, Forest Hill Road, Travis Avenue	Peak service only; On April 23, 1991, the Mayor held a public hearing on a proposed resolution to approve the establishment of the X30 and X31 bus routes on a six-month pilot basis.; Began service on June 3, 1991.; Service initially ran an into Manhattan via the Verrazano-Narrows Bridge, the Gowanus Expressway, and the Brooklyn-Battery Tunnel. A stop was made at West Street and Vesey Street, and service continued up West Street. AM service turned onto 11th Avenue, 23rd Street, and then up Madison Avenue and then 57th Street to the terminal at Third Avenue. In the PM, service started at Park Avenue and 57th Street, then went south on Lexington Avenue, west on 23rd Street, before heading on Seventh Avenue and West Houston Street, before joining up with the AM route at West Street.; AM trips ran via the Gowanus Expressway, PM trips ran via Lincoln Tunnel, New Jersey Turnpike and the Goethals Bridge.; On April 1, 1996, morning buses were rerouted via New Jersey to save up to 40 minutes in travel time and the route was extended 1.8 miles (2.9 km) from Marsh Avenue to the Richmond Avenue turnaround. The changes were made in response to a competing express bus route set up by a private bus operator on February 5, 1996, which already ran via New Jersey. A free transfer was instituted to make up for the loss of service to Lower Manhattan at Vesey Street. After three months, the changes increased ridership by 20%, making up most of the ridership lost to the competing bus company.; Operated via Lincoln Tunnel in both directions until March 20, 2006, when buses were rerouted via the Staten Island and Gowanus Expressways and West Street. This was following the opening of the Staten Island Expressway bus lane in November 2005.

===== Other X- routes =====
Route	Terminals		Streets Traveled	History and Notes
B27X	Became the X27 in 1976.			
B28X	Became the X28 in 1976.			
B29X	Became the X29 in 1976. See below for more information.			
M23X	Service began on April 1, 1972, and later became the X23, and then the X90 in 1988. See below for more information.			
Q18X	Service began on August 2, 1971, and later became the X18, and then the X68 on April 15, 1990.			
Q20X	Service began in October 1971, and later became the X20, and then the X63 on April 15, 1990.			
Q24X	Service began in October 1971, and later became the X24, and then the X64 on April 15, 1990.			
R8X	Port Richmond, Staten Island; Richmond Avenue and Richmond Terrace	Downtown Brooklyn; Adams Street and Fulton Street	Clove Road, Broadway, Verrazano–Narrows Bridge, Gowanus Expressway	On February 4, 1965, it was announced that the NYCTA was studying whether it was feasible to create an express bus route between Staten Island and downtown Brooklyn via the Verrazano-Narrows Bridge at the suggestion of Brooklyn Borough President Abe Stark.; Service started on November 3, 1965 on a six-month trial basis. Buses made two trips in the morning rush to Brooklyn, and two trips in the evening rush from Brooklyn. The service ran express between Clove Road and Richmond Road and Adams Street and Fulton Street. The fare at the time was 30 cents.; First express bus route to link Staten Island with Downtown Brooklyn.; Renumbered the X8.; On November 2, 1989, a proposal was held to discontinue service on the route due to low ridership. An average of 16 riders used the route per day in either direction.; The route made its last trip on April 13, 1990, and was discontinued on April 15, 1990. It was estimated that discontinuing the route would save $71,000 a year. Before it was discontinued, there was only one trip in each direction.
X18 (First use)	Service began on August 2, 1971 as the Q18X, and then became the X68 on April 15, 1990.			
X20 (First use)	Service began in October 1971 as the Q20X, and became the X63 on April 15, 1990.			
X23 (First use)	Service began on April 1, 1972 as the M23X; renamed the X90 in 1988. See below for more information.			
X24 (First use)	Service began in October 1971 as the Q24X, and became the X64 on April 15, 1990.			
X25	Battery Park City, Lower Manhattan; World Financial Center; Vesey Street and North End Avenue	Midtown Manhattan; Grand Central Terminal; 42nd Street and Lexington Avenue	Worth Street (SB), Chambers Street (NB), 42nd Street, FDR Drive	Began service on October 1, 1976 running from Grand Central to Battery Place and Greenwich Street. The service included a UniTicket program between the Conrail (now Metro-North) rail service at Grand Central and the express bus route.; Discontinued on June 27, 2010 due to a budget crisis.
X26	Battery Park City, Lower Manhattan; World Financial Center; Vesey Street and North End Avenue	Midtown Manhattan; Penn Station; 32nd Street and 7th Avenue	West Street	Created in 2002 with September 11 FEMA funds, to help replace IRT Broadway–Seventh Avenue Line and PATH service to Lower Manhattan. Discontinued on April 12, 2004, following the resumption of PATH service.
X27B & X27C X28B & X28C	See X27 (X27B) and X28 (X28B) for the current destinations and streets traveled.		X27B and X28B travel path is the same as X27 and X28 except running via West Street and World Financial Center.; Service operated briefly from January 3, 2011 until July 1, 2011, due to a lawsuit which stated that 2010 service cuts violated the ADA law.; These routes were replaced by reinstated X37 and X38 bus service.; X27C and X28C trips were short turns to Worth St.	
X29	Midtown Manhattan; 57th Street and Madison Avenue	Coney Island, Brooklyn; Stillwell Avenue and Surf Avenue	Northbound: Church Street, 6th Avenue, Madison Avenue; Southbound: 5th Avenue, Broadway; Brooklyn: Coney Island Avenue, Surf Avenue	Began service on February 14, 1972 as B29X.; Originally the B29X; renumbered in 1976; Served Midtown and Downtown Manhattan.; Original terminal was West 5th Street and Sea Breeze Avenue (near Surf Avenue); later extended to Surf Avenue & West 37th Street (at Sea Gate), then truncated to Stillwell Avenue.; In January 2000, the MTA announced plans to reroute northbound X27, X28, and X29 to run directly via Greenwich Street and Trinity Place after exiting the Brooklyn Battery Tunnel, instead of running via a 0.5 miles (0.80 km)-long loop consisting of West Street, Battery Place, Greenwich Street, and Trinity Place. The reroute would eliminate three left turns and the need to travel through two traffic lights. While making the loop normally took about five minutes, it could take 15 minutes or longer under heavy traffic congestion. Service to the Greenwich Street and Battery Place bus stop, used by 475 people per weekday, or 11 percent of all Manhattan-bound riders on the three routes would be discontinued. The change, which would take effect the same month, was expected to save $20,000 a year. This change had been implemented successfully on the X1 and X14 bus routes. The change took effect in February 2000. In July 2000, the MTA announced plans to reverse the change for northbound X1, X12, X27, X28, and X29 service during morning peak periods due to the planned extension of the Gowanus Expressway High-Occupancy Vehicle (HOV) Lane through the Brooklyn Battery Tunnel during the morning peak period between 6 a.m. and 10 a.m.. The change would be made since the extension of the HOV lane would prevent vehicles from moving between the left and right tubes within the toll plaza at the entrance to the tunnel, meaning buses using the HOV lane would no longer be able to exit on Trinity Place. To address the fact that the reroute would restore the congested through loop, MTA Bridges and Tunnels planned to place police officers and traffic agents at key locations to regulate traffic flow. The change, which would take effect in late July 2000, was expected to increase annual operating costs by $32,000.; Discontinued on June 27, 2010 due to a budget crisis.
X32	Bedford Park, Bronx; The Bronx High School of Science; 205th Street and Paul Avenue	Jamaica, Queens; 165th Street Bus Terminal	Parsons Boulevard, Union Street, Kissena Boulevard, Horace Harding Expressway, 188th Street	School days only, began service on September 12, 1983 and discontinued on June 27, 2010 due to a budget crisis. Service replicated by Q44 and Bx22 local buses and private buses for school students.; Traveled between Queens and the Bronx via the Whitestone Bridge, and non-stop in the Bronx via the Hutchinson River Parkway, Cross Bronx Expressway, Bronx River Parkway, Kasmiroff Boulevard (Southern Boulevard), and Bedford Park Boulevard.
X32	Bedford Park, Bronx; The Bronx High School of Science; 205th Street and Paul Avenue	Oakland Gardens, Queens; Union Turnpike and Springfield Blvd	Parsons Boulevard, Union Street, Kissena Boulevard, 46th Avenue, 48th Avenue, Springfield Boulevard	School days only, began service on September 12, 1983 and discontinued on June 27, 2010 due to a budget crisis. Service replicated by Q44 and Bx22 local buses and private buses for school students.; Traveled between Queens and the Bronx via the Whitestone Bridge, and non-stop in the Bronx via the Hutchinson River Parkway, Cross Bronx Expressway, Bronx River Parkway, Kasmiroff Boulevard (Southern Boulevard), and Bedford Park Boulevard.
X32	Bedford Park, Bronx; The Bronx High School of Science; 205th Street and Paul Avenue	Bay Terrace, Queens; Bell Boulevard and 23rd Avenue	Parsons Boulevard, Union Street, 150th Street, 29th Avenue, 32nd Avenue	School days only, began service on September 12, 1983 and discontinued on June 27, 2010 due to a budget crisis. Service replicated by Q44 and Bx22 local buses and private buses for school students.; Traveled between Queens and the Bronx via the Whitestone Bridge, and non-stop in the Bronx via the Hutchinson River Parkway, Cross Bronx Expressway, Bronx River Parkway, Kasmiroff Boulevard (Southern Boulevard), and Bedford Park Boulevard.
X51	Midtown Manhattan; 34th Street and 3rd Avenue	Auburndale, Queens; Sanford Avenue and 165th Street	34th Street, 6th Avenue, 57th Street, Sanford Avenue	Began service on September 5, 1978.; Discontinued on June 27, 2010 during a budget crisis, due to low ridership and proximity to 7 subway service, and the Long Island Rail Road Port Washington Branch stations nearby.
X61	Lower Manhattan; Peck Slip and Water Street	Riverdale, Bronx; West 262nd Street and Broadway	Broadway, Major Deegan Expressway, FDR Drive, Wall Street	Began service on September 11, 1978.; Service reduced in 1980 due to low ridership.; Discontinued in early 1990.
X63	Redesignated as the QM63 on June 29, 2025.			
X64	Redesignated as the QM64 on June 29, 2025.			
X66	Midtown Manhattan; 57th Street and 5th Avenue	Coney Island, Brooklyn; Avenue Z and Ocean Parkway	Broadway, 5th Avenue, Bay Ridge Parkway, Stillwell Avenue, 86th Street, Shell Road, Avenue Z.	Discontinued in early 1980, became BM15 operated by Fiesta Bus in 1981, then operated by Metro Apple Express in the late 1980s; Discontinued when Metro Apple Express went bankrupt.
X68	Redesignated as the QM68 on June 29, 2025.			
X81	Woodside, Queens; 61st Street ( trains) and Woodside (LIRR) stations	Randall's Island; Icahn Stadium	Brooklyn Queens Expressway, Grand Central Parkway, Hell Gate Circle	Events-only special. Last ran in 2009, discontinued sometime after.
X82	Inwood; Dyckman St station( train)	Randall's Island; Icahn Stadium		Unknown if route actually ran, seen on bus display signs. If route did run, it was most likely during events.
X83	Yankees Stadium, The Bronx	Randall's Island Icahn Stadium		Events-only special. Last ran in 2010, discontinued sometime after.
X84	Shea Stadium, Queens	Randall's Island; Icahn Stadium		Unknown if route actually ran, seen on bus display signs. If route did run, it was most likely during events.
X85	George Washington Bridge Bus Station	Randall's Island; Icahn Stadium		Unknown if route actually ran, seen on bus display signs. If route did run, it was most likely during events.
X86	Harlem, Manhattan; 145th Street and Broadway at 145th Street ( train)	Randall's Island Icahn Stadium		Unknown if route actually ran, seen on bus display signs. If route did run, it was most likely during events.
X90	Battery Park City, Lower Manhattan; World Financial Center; Vesey Street and North End Avenue	Yorkville, Manhattan; 91st Street and York Avenue	West Street, FDR Drive, Water Street, York Avenue	The New York City Transit Authority, in March 1971, sought permission from the New York City Board of Estimate to operate express buses during rush hours along the FDR Drive. It was hoped that the route would attract Upper East Side residents that used their cars to get to the Financial District.; Began service on April 12, 1971 as the M23X. Service ran every 15 minutes between 7:15 a.m. and 9 a.m.. from York Avenue and 91st Street to John Street and Water Street. There were intermediate stops on York Avenue at 86th Street and 79th Street, 79th Street and East End Avenue, and at Broad Street, Wall Street, and John Street on Water Street. Buses ran from Lower Manhattan between 4 p.m. and 5:45 p.m.; The two former southern termini in Lower Manhattan were at Pearl Street and Frankfort Street, and at Water Street and Broad Street.; On June 24, 1996, service was rerouted from 5th Avenue and Madison Avenue with a terminal at 110th Street and 5th Avenue to a terminal at 92nd Street and York Avenue, running along York Avenue to 55th Street.; Extended to World Financial Center on September 9, 2002.; Discontinued on June 27, 2010 due to a budget crisis.; Renamed from the X23 in 1988.; The route had an alternate northern terminus in Harlem at 110th Street and 5th Avenue.
X92	Lower Manhattan; South Ferry	Yorkville, Manhattan; 92nd Street and York Avenue	FDR Drive, 1st Avenue, 2nd Avenue, York Avenue	Combined into the then-X90 route in 2004.

=== MTA Bus Company ===
Route	Terminals		Streets Traveled	History and Notes
BxM4A	Midtown Manhattan; 26th Street and Madison Avenue	Bedford Park, Bronx; 205th Street and Paul Avenue	Manhattan: 5th Avenue (southbound), Madison Avenue (northbound); Bronx: Grand Concourse, West Gun Hill Road	Discontinued on June 27, 2010 due to budget crisis.; It was replaced by the BxM4, and no service was restored to the Bedford Park branch.
BxM4B	Service began in 1976, and later became the BxM4 on June 27, 2010.			
BxM7A	Service began on January 10, 1972, and later became the BxM8 in September 2011.			
BxM7B	Midtown Manhattan; 23rd Street and Madison Avenue	City Island, Bronx; Rochelle Street and City Island Avenue	Manhattan: 2nd Avenue, 116th Street, 5th Avenue (southbound); Madison Avenue, 72nd Street, 3rd Avenue (northbound), Bronx: Bruckner Expressway, City Island Avenue	Discontinued on June 27, 2010 due to budget crisis.; It was replaced with two BxM8 trips extended to City Island.
QM1A	See QM1, QM6, QM7 and QM8 for details.			
QM2A	Relabeled to QM20.			
QM3	Midtown Manhattan; 57th Street and 6th Avenue	Little Neck; Little Neck Parkway and Horace Harding Expressway		Discontinued on June 27, 2025 during Queens Bus Redesign, due to low ridership and proximity to 7 subway service, and the Long Island Rail Road Port Washington Branch stations nearby.
QM22	Midtown Manhattan: Eastbound: 57th Street and 3rd Avenue (both branches); Westbound: 34th Street and 3rd Avenue (via 3rd Avenue); 38th Street and 3rd Avenue (via 6th Avenue)	Jackson Heights, Queens; 31st Avenue and 77th Street	Manhattan: 3rd Avenue branch: 3rd Avenue, 59th Street; 6th Avenue branch: 34th Street, 6th Avenue, 57th Street; Queens: 21st Street, 21st Avenue, Ditmars Boulevard	Formerly operated by Triboro Coach beginning June 6, 1988.; Two different route branches in Manhattan: Third Avenue and Sixth Avenue; Discontinued on June 27, 2010 due to budget crisis.
QM23	Midtown Manhattan; 33rd Street and 7th Avenue at Penn Station	Woodhaven, Queens 102nd Street and Jamaica Avenue	Manhattan: 34th Street; Queens: Woodhaven Boulevard, Jamaica Avenue	Formerly operated by Green Bus Lines beginning in the early 1950s.; Replacement for former Long Island Rail Road Rockaway Beach Branch service from the Brooklyn Manor station.; One trip in each direction during peak hours.; Discontinued on June 27, 2010 due to budget crisis.
BQM1	Relabeled to BM5			

=== Command Bus Company (special service) ===
Eight special routes, which were operated by Pioneer Bus then Command Bus Company. All service discontinued in 2001.

Route	Terminals		Streets Traveled
BQ5	Bay Ridge, Brooklyn; 86th Street and 4th Avenue	Aqueduct Race Track, Queens; Belmont Park, Nassau County	86th Street, 19th Avenue, 65th Street, 23rd Avenue, Avenue M, Flatlands Avenue, Pennsylvania Avenue, Linden Boulevard
BQ10	Midwood, Brooklyn; Nostrand Avenue and Flatbush Avenue	Aqueduct Race Track, Queens; Belmont Park, Nassau County	Flatbush Avenue, Church Avenue, Linden Boulevard
BQ11	Midwood, Brooklyn Kings Highway and East 16th Street, Coney Island, Brooklyn Mermaid Avenue and Stillwell Avenue	Aqueduct Race Track, Queens; Belmont Park, Nassau County	Kings Highway route: Kings Highway, Avenue M; Coney Island route: Stillwell Avenue, Neptune Avenue, Ocean Parkway, Avenue Z, Nostrand Avenue, Avenue U, Mill Avenue, Ralph Avenue; Both routes: Flatlands Avenue, Pennsylvania Avenue, Linden Boulevard
BQ12	Midwood, Brooklyn; Nostrand Avenue and Flatbush Avenue	Shea Stadium, Queens	Flatbush Avenue, Church Avenue, Linden Boulevard
BW4	Bay Ridge, Brooklyn; 86th Street and 4th Avenue	Yonkers Raceway, Westchester County	86th Street, 19th Avenue, 65th Street, 23rd Avenue, Avenue M, Flatlands Avenue, Pennsylvania Avenue, Linden Boulevard
BMJ1	Sheepshead Bay, Brooklyn; East 15th Street and Sheephead Bay Road	Meadowlands Racetrack, New Jersey	Avenue Z, Coney Island Avenue, Avenue M, 23rd Avenue, 65th Street, 19th Avenue, 86th Street, 4th Avenue, Flatbush Avenue
BMJ2	Spring Creek, Brooklyn; Pennsylvania Avenue and Flatlands Avenue	Meadowlands Racetrack, New Jersey	Flatlands Avenue, Avenue M, Kings Highway, Nostrand Avenue, Flatbush Avenue

Note: An additional route, the BM2S bus route, ran from Starrett City to Downtown Manhattan ran via Flatlands Avenue between East 80th Street and East 105th Street. The service still operates as part of regular BM2 service during rush hour. In addition, Command operated ferry shuttle buses around the Bay Ridge area from the Brooklyn Army Terminal after September 11, 2001, for the free ferry ride to/from the Wall Street pier. Both Pioneer Bus then Command Bus operated bus service to/from Roosevelt Raceway.

=== Avenue B and East Broadway Transit Company (special service) ===
The Avenue B and East Broadway Transit Company operated the M7 express route between 5th Avenue & 110th Street and World Trade Center. It also operated a morning only M7A route that ran on 2nd Avenue between 79th and 63rd Streets and the World Trade Center. It additionally operated four special routes to racetracks in the New York City metropolitan area. Service was discontinued on April 1, 1980. The M7 express route became a part of the X23 route upon being taken over by the New York City Transit Authority, then became the original X90. X90 service to 5th Avenue & 110th Street was discontinued in 1996.

Route	Terminals		Streets Traveled
MN20	Chinatown, Manhattan	Belmont Park, Nassau County	Manhattan: 2nd Avenue
MN21	Chinatown, Manhattan	Roosevelt Raceway, Nassau County	Manhattan: 2nd Avenue
MQ20	Chinatown, Manhattan	Aqueduct Racetrack, Queens	Manhattan: 2nd Avenue
MW20	Chinatown, Manhattan	Yonkers Raceway, Westchester County	Manhattan: 2nd Avenue

=== Caravan Bus Systems (temporary operation) ===
From late 1988 to early 1990, Queens Surface Corporation discontinued the QM1 Wall Street and QM3 after the City of New York pulled its funding for the service. Caravan Bus Systems Inc. picked up these routes due to equipment shortages and budget cuts with the approval of the NYCDOT. Caravan Bus Systems Inc. ran the QM1 Wall Street and QM3 with no subsidy from NYC and returned the lines to Queens Surface in 1990. This was due to protests from Queens elected officials who were afraid that Caravan Bus Systems Inc. would discontinue the routes after they lost money and was refused the city subsidy that these routes got under Queens/Steinway Transit Corp. prior to Queens Surface takeover on July 1, 1988.

Route	Terminals	Streets Traveled
QM25	Queens and Manhattan	Same as current QM7 route
QM26	Queens and Manhattan	Same as current QM8 route
QM27	Queens and Manhattan	North Shore Towers to Downtown
QM28	Queens and Manhattan	Same as QM3 route that existed from 1970 to 1988 and again from 1990 to 2025.

=== Metro Apple Express (MAX) ===
Metro Apple Express (MAX) operated buses in Brooklyn, Manhattan, Queens and to Jones Beach during its existence. The BM10 started on Sunday, June 10, 1984. They did not have fare boxes on the bus so the drivers were able to make change. Their bus schedules were color-coded for each route, BM10 was black, BM11 was blue, BM12 was green and BM15 was red. The president was Patrick Condren.

Route	Terminus in Brooklyn	↔	Streets traveled in Manhattan	Terminus in Manhattan
BM10	Bay Ridge; 97th Street and 3rd Avenue, ran NB, 3rd Avenue. ran SB, 4th Avenue	↔	Northbound: Brooklyn Battery Tunnel, Trinity Place, Church Street, 6th Avenue Southbound: 5th Avenue, Broadway, Brooklyn Battery Tunnel	Midtown; 59th Street and 5th Avenue
BM11	Bensonhurst; Bay Ridge Parkway and Bay Parkway, (originally, Bay Parkway & 65th Street), ran on Bay Parkway, 65th Street	↔	Northbound: Brooklyn Battery Tunnel, Trinity Place, Church Street, 6th Avenue Southbound: 5th Avenue, Broadway, Brooklyn Battery Tunnel	Midtown; 59th Street and 5th Avenue
BM12	Bay Ridge; 4th Avenue and Bay Ridge Parkway, ran on Bay Ridge Parkway, Fort Hamilton Parkway, McDonald Avenue, Prospect Expressway	↔	Northbound: Brooklyn Battery Tunnel, Trinity Place, Church Street, 6th Avenue Southbound: 5th Avenue, Broadway, Brooklyn Battery Tunnel	Midtown; 59th Street and 5th Avenue
BM15	Coney Island; Ocean Parkway and Avenue Z at Coney Island Hospital Bensonhurst; Bay Parkway and Bay Ridge Parkway (Saturday service), ran on Avenue Z, Shell Road, 86th Street, Stillwell Avenue, Bay Ridge Parkway, (Originally ran on 12th Avenue, 65th Street), 3rd Avenue	↔	Northbound: Brooklyn Battery Tunnel, Trinity Place, Church Street, 6th Avenue Southbound: 5th Avenue, Broadway, Brooklyn Battery Tunnel	Midtown; 59th Street and 5th Avenue
Notes:	BM10 began service on June 10, 1984. New branches to 65th Street and Bay Parkway and to Bay Ridge via Fort Hamilton Parkway were planned for early 1986, becoming the BM11 (initially known as BM10A) and BM12 respectively.; BM10 service operated 7 days a week with 28 daily trips and 5-10 minute headways from 6AM to 9AM.; All routes discontinued in May 1994 when company shut down. They tried to start again as Metro Apple in August 1995, using ex-NYCT Blitz buses, but it did not last.; Bay Ridge Parkway was listed as 75th Street on their schedules and bus signs, which is the same street name.; BM15: Originally, Fiesta Bus operated the route, BM15 originally ran southbound via Lexington Avenue.; BM10, BM11 super express ran during the PM Rush Hours, via 23rd Street, FDR Drive and Downtown Manhattan service began at Thomas Street & Broadway, BM10 super express originally ran Via West Houston Street, West Street, than switched to the FDR Drive.; BM15 one trip during the PM Rush Hours started at Fulton Street & Water Street.; The check point Brooklyn bound originally was at Broadway and Exchange Pl, then 66th Street & 4th Avenue in Bay Ridge, it was changed when they started the super express so passengers may transfer between buses, that is why the BM11, and BM15 routes were changed, the check point for Manhattan bound was the last pick up stop in Brooklyn.; BM11 started to terminate from Manhattan in 1989 at Bay Ridge Parkway & 12th Avenue; QBM1, (Breezy Point, Beach 217th Street) and QBM2 (Hammels, Beach 73rd Street) via Madison Ave. Originally, operated by Erin Tours.; They had 2 Jones Beach routes, the BN1 Bay Ridge, the MN1 started at Midtown, 55th Street & 2nd Avenue ran during the summer months, and they ran an Amtrak special ran between Grand Central & Penn Station for passengers who needed to transfer between trains, and a Department Of Labor ran for the employees between the office and Downtown Brooklyn to connect to the subways.			

=== Red & Tan in Hudson County ===
Route	Terminus (in Staten Island)	Streets traveled (in Staten Island)	↔	Streets traveled (in New Jersey)	Terminus (in New Jersey)	Notes
122	Eltingville; Richmond Avenue and Hylan Boulevard	Hylan Boulevard, Steuben Street, Clove Road, Forest Avenue, Willowbrook Expressway	↔	Interstate 78, Route 440, Bayonne Bridge	Hoboken; Hoboken Terminal	Discontinued in May 2005.
144	Arden Heights; Arthur Kill Road and West Shore Expressway	Arden Road, Richmond Avenue, Staten Island Mall, Forest Avenue, Willowbrook Expressway	↔	Interstate 78, Route 440, Bayonne Bridge	Hoboken; Hoboken Terminal	Discontinued in January 2007.

=== Atlantic Express ===
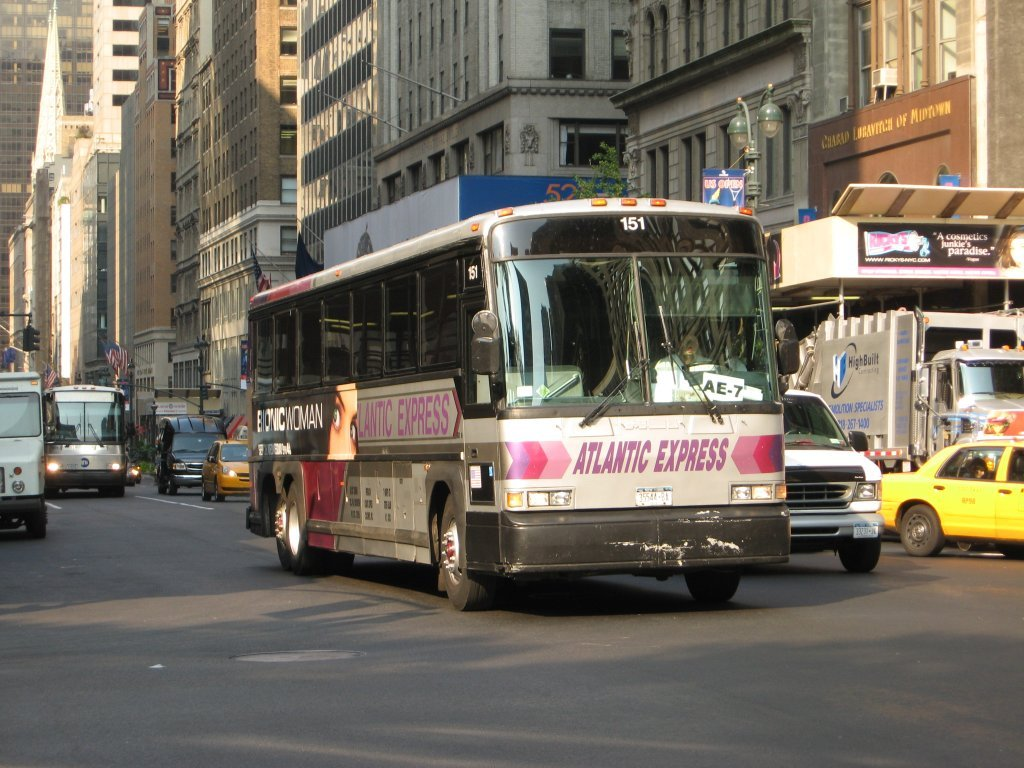
Atlantic Express bus in 2007

All routes going into Manhattan terminate at Midtown on East 59th Street and Madison Avenue.

All routes traveled via into West Shore Expressway, Goethals Bridge into New Jersey's New Jersey Turnpike, Lincoln Tunnel; in Manhattan: 34th Street, Madison Avenue (northbound) and 5th Avenue (Southbound).

These routes were operated by Academy Bus until June 2001, when the franchises were awarded to Atlantic Express. All of these routes have been rebranded or eliminated.

Route	Terminus (in Staten Island)	Streets traveled (in Staten Island)	Notes
AE1	Huguenot; Luten Avenue and Amboy Road	Luten Avenue, Hylan Boulevard, Seguine Avenue, Foster Road, Woodrow Road	Service began in July 2001.; Rebranded X23 on August 27, 2001.
AE2	New Dorp; Luten Avenue and Hylan Boulevard	Hylan Boulevard, Arden Avenue, Woodrow Road, Huguenot Avenue	Service began in July 2001.; Rebranded X24 on August 27, 2001.; Formerly Academy Bus Arden route.
AE4	Rossville; Bloomingdale Road and Veterans Parkway	Bloomingdale Road, Amboy Road, Rossville Avenue, Arthur Kill Road	Service began June 25, 2001.; Replaced by X21 on August 27, 2001, operated by NYC Transit.; Discontinued permanently in 2002.
AE5	Richmond Valley; Page Avenue and Amboy Road	Amboy Road, Main Street, Hylan Boulevard, Segume Avenue, Huguenot Avenue	Service began June 25, 2001.; Replaced by X22 on August 27, 2001, operated by NYC Transit on August 27, 2001.; Formerly Academy Bus Amboy route.
AE6	Travis; 141 East Service Road at Showplace Bowling (Park-and-Ride)	West Shore Expressway	Service began in 2001.; Service discontinued on August 4, 2003, because Atlantic Express lost the lease at the bus terminal.; It was combined with route AE7 operations and MTA's X22 express route.
AE7	Pleasant Plains; West Shore Expressway and Veterans Parkway at Outerbridge Park-and-Ride	West Shore Expressway, Page Avenue, Hylan Boulevard	Originally operated from park and ride at the Showplace Entertainment Center in Travis in June 2001.; Move to new terminal at Pleasant Plains on January 13, 2003.; Extended to Hylan Blvd & Seguine Avenue in 2010 in an effort to boost ridership.; Discontinued in December 2010 due to low ridership.; X22 service rerouted to Outerbridge Park & Ride in July 2011.
