= Interstate 440 =

Interstate 440 may refer to:

- Interstate 440 (Arkansas), a partial loop around Little Rock
- Interstate 440 (North Carolina), a partial beltway in Raleigh
- Interstate 440 (Oklahoma), abolished—now part of Interstate 44
- Interstate 440 (Tennessee), a bypass of Downtown Nashville
