= Quebec Autoroute 440 =

Quebec Autoroute 440 may refer to:

- Quebec Autoroute 440 (Laval)
- Quebec Autoroute 440 (Quebec City)
