= Pic a Tenerife =

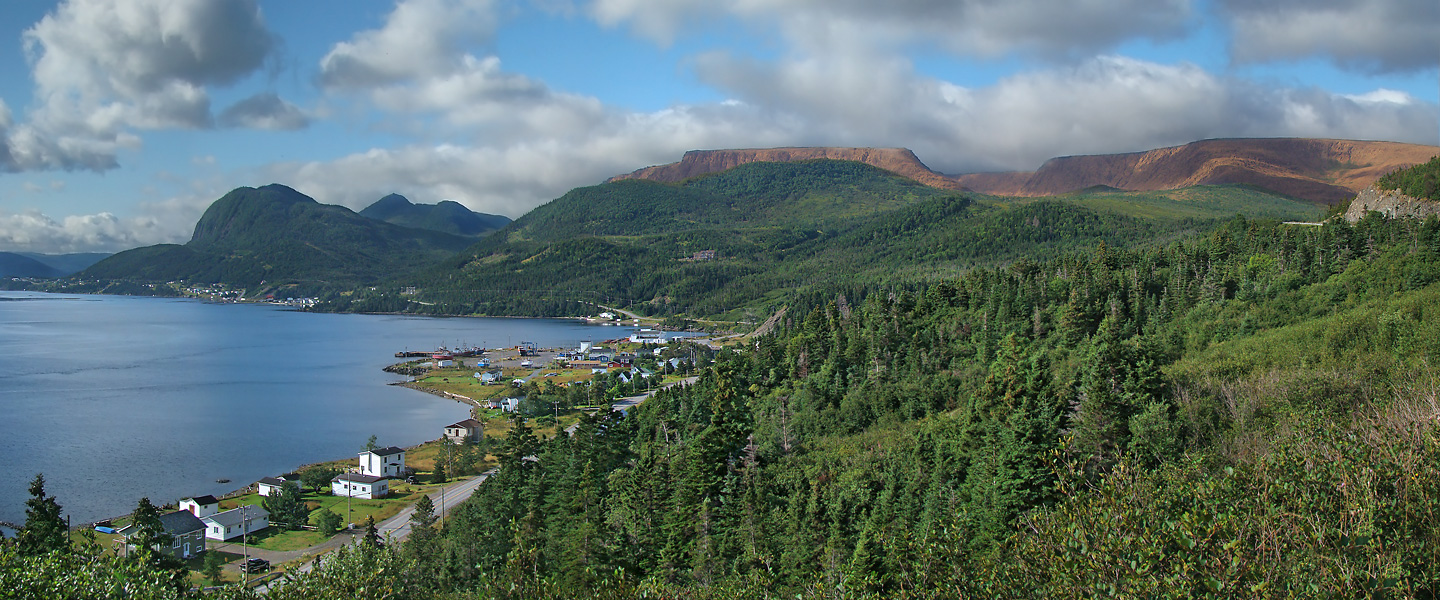

Highest point
- Elevation: 545 m (1,788 ft)
- Prominence: 545 m (1,788 ft)
- Coordinates: 49°26′10″N 57°55′23″W

Geography
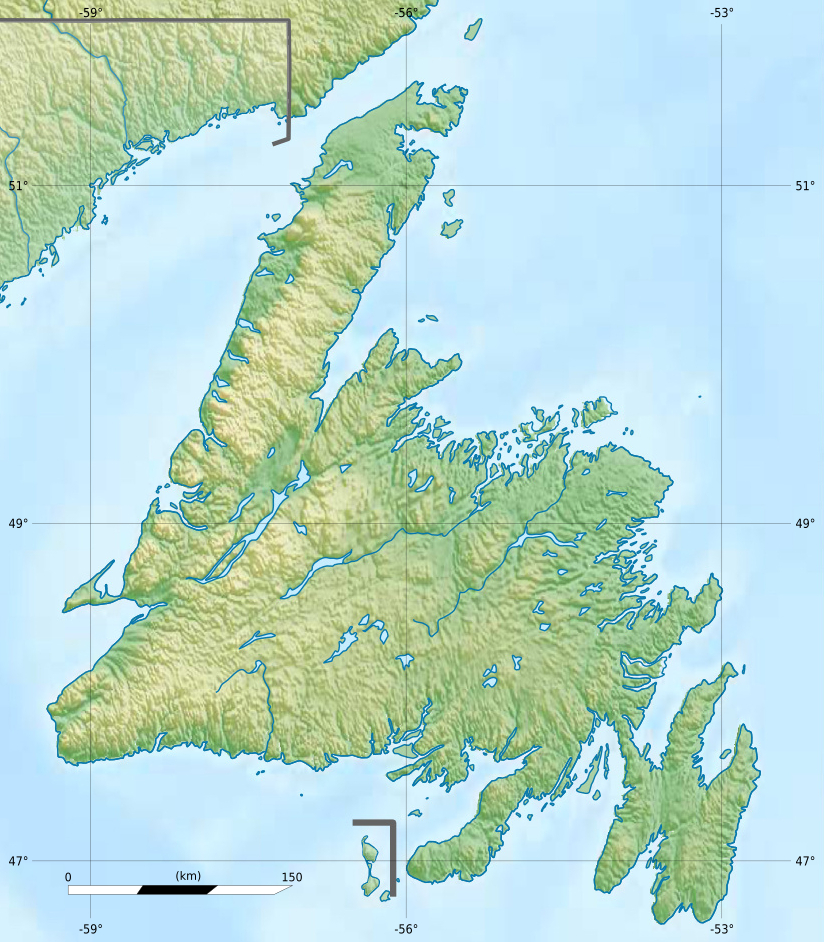
- Location within Newfoundland
- Location: Newfoundland, Canada
- Parent range: Long Range Mountains
- Topo map: NTS 12H5 Lomond

Climbing
- Easiest route: class 2 scramble

Pic a Tenerife (/tɛnəˈriːf/; Spanish: [teneˈɾife]) is a mountain located in western Newfoundland, near the coastal community of Glenburnie in Gros Morne National Park. It is 545 m (1,788 ft) high and was named by Captain James Cook in 1767. It takes its name from the island of Tenerife in Spain.

== See also ==
- Mountain peaks of Canada
