= Newfoundland and Labrador Route 431 =

Highway in Newfoundland and Labrador, Canada

Route 431
- Bonne Bay Road
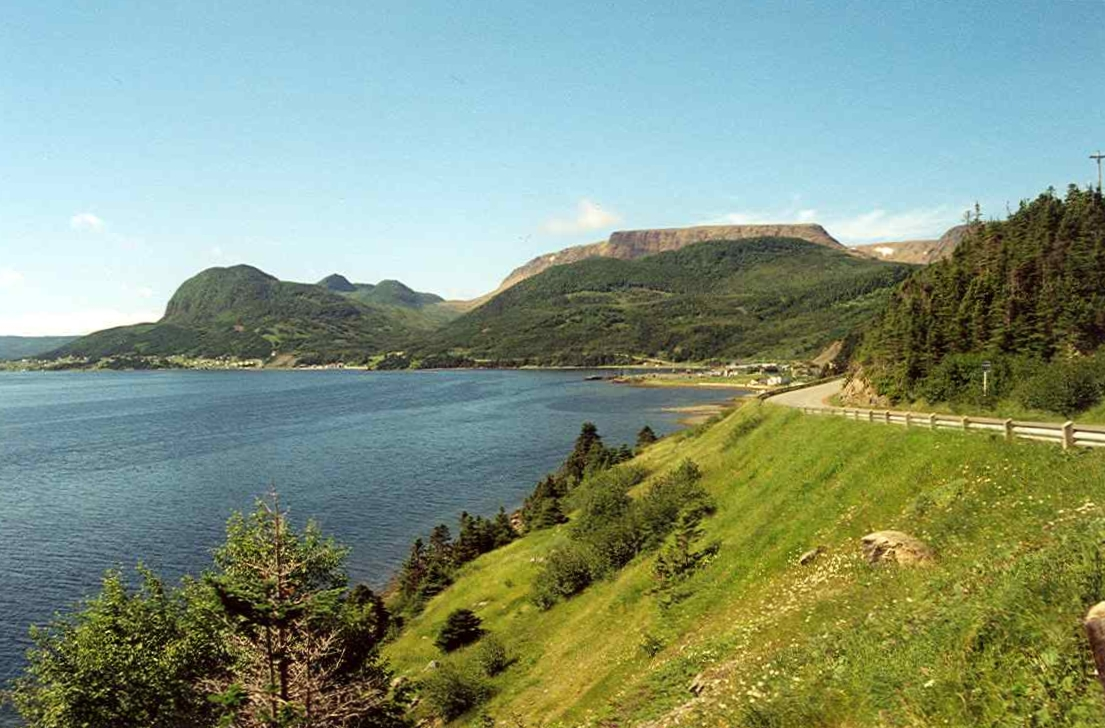
- Route 431 in Gros Morne National Park

Route information
- Maintained by Newfoundland and Labrador Department of Transportation and Infrastructure
- Length: 50.7 km (31.5 mi)

Major junctions
- West end: Main Street in Trout River
- East end: Route 430 at Wiltondale

Location
- Country: Canada
- Province: Newfoundland and Labrador

Highway system
- Highways in Newfoundland and Labrador
← Route 430	→ Route 432

Route 431, also known as Bonne Bay Road, is a short highway almost entirely within Gros Morne National Park on the island of Newfoundland in the Canadian province of Newfoundland and Labrador. It begins at a junction of Route 430 in Wiltondale and terminates at Trout River. It serves the town of Woody Point on Bonne Bay and passes through the communities of Glenburnie, Birchy Head and Winter House Brook.

== Route description ==
Route 431 begins in Trout River, along the banks of the river of the same name, at a Y-Intersection with Main Street just south of downtown and the coastline. It heads east to enter Gros Morne National Park and pass through The Tablelands section of the park for several kilometres. The highway temporarily exits the park to pass through the town of Woody Point, where it has a Y-Intersection with Back Road (which leads to downtown). Route 431 now winds its way southeast along the coastline of Bonne Bay as it passes through Winter House Brook and Glenburnie-Birchy Head-Shoal Brook. The highway begins winding its eastward through the Long Range Mountains as it re-enters the National Park, where it meets a local road leading to Lomond and crosses the Lomond River. Route 431 now enters Wiltondale and it comes to an end at an intersection with Route 430 (Great Northern Peninsula Highway/Viking Trail).

== Major intersections ==
Location	km	mi	Destinations	Notes
Trout River	0.0	0.0	Main Street - Downtown, Trout River Pond	Western terminus
Gros Morne National Park	4.6	2.9	Green Gardens trailhead	
Gros Morne National Park	12.5	7.8	The Tablelands trailhead	
Woody Point	16.6	10.3	Lookout Hills trailhead	
Woody Point	17.2	10.7	Back Road (Route 431-11) - Downtown	
Gros Morne National Park	37.1	23.1	Lomond Road (Route 431-10) - Lomond	
Gros Morne National Park	40.1	24.9	Lomond River Lodge	Campground
Wiltondale	50.7	31.5	Route 430 (Great Northern Peninsula Highway/Viking Trail) to Route 1 (TCH) – St. Anthony, Port au Choix, Deer Lake	Eastern terminus
1.000 mi = 1.609 km; 1.000 km = 0.621 mi

== See also ==
- List of Newfoundland and Labrador highways
