= List of highways numbered 435 =

The following highways are numbered 435:

== Canada ==
- Manitoba Provincial Road 435
- New Brunswick Route 435
- Newfoundland and Labrador Route 435

== Japan ==
- Route 435 (Japan)

== United Kingdom ==
- A435 running between Birmingham and Cirencester

== United States ==
- Interstate 435
- Florida State Road 435
- Indiana State Road 435 (former)
- Louisiana Highway 435
- Ohio State Route 435
- Pennsylvania Route 435
- Wyoming Highway 435

Territories

- Puerto Rico Highway 435

Preceded by 434	Lists of highways 435	Succeeded by 436
