= List of highways numbered 431 =

Route 431, or Highway 431, may refer to:

== Canada ==
- Newfoundland and Labrador Route 431

== Cuba ==
- Callejero de Reparto Universitario (4–431)

== Hungary ==
- Main road 431 (Hungary)

== India ==
- National Highway 431 (India)

== Israel ==
- Highway 431 (Israel)

== Japan ==
- Japan National Route 431

== United States ==
- U.S. Route 431
- Florida:
  - Florida State Road 431
    - Florida State Road 431B (former)
  - County Road 431 (Seminole County, Florida)
  - County Road 431B (Seminole County, Florida)
- Indiana State Road 431 (former)
- Iowa Highway 431 (former)
- Nevada State Route 431
- New York State Route 431
- Puerto Rico Highway 431
- Tennessee State Route 431
- Texas:
  - Texas State Highway Loop 431
  - Farm to Market Road 431
- Washington State Route 431
- Wyoming Highway 431

Preceded by 430	Lists of highways 431	Succeeded by 432
