= Trout River, Newfoundland and Labrador =

Trout River
- Town
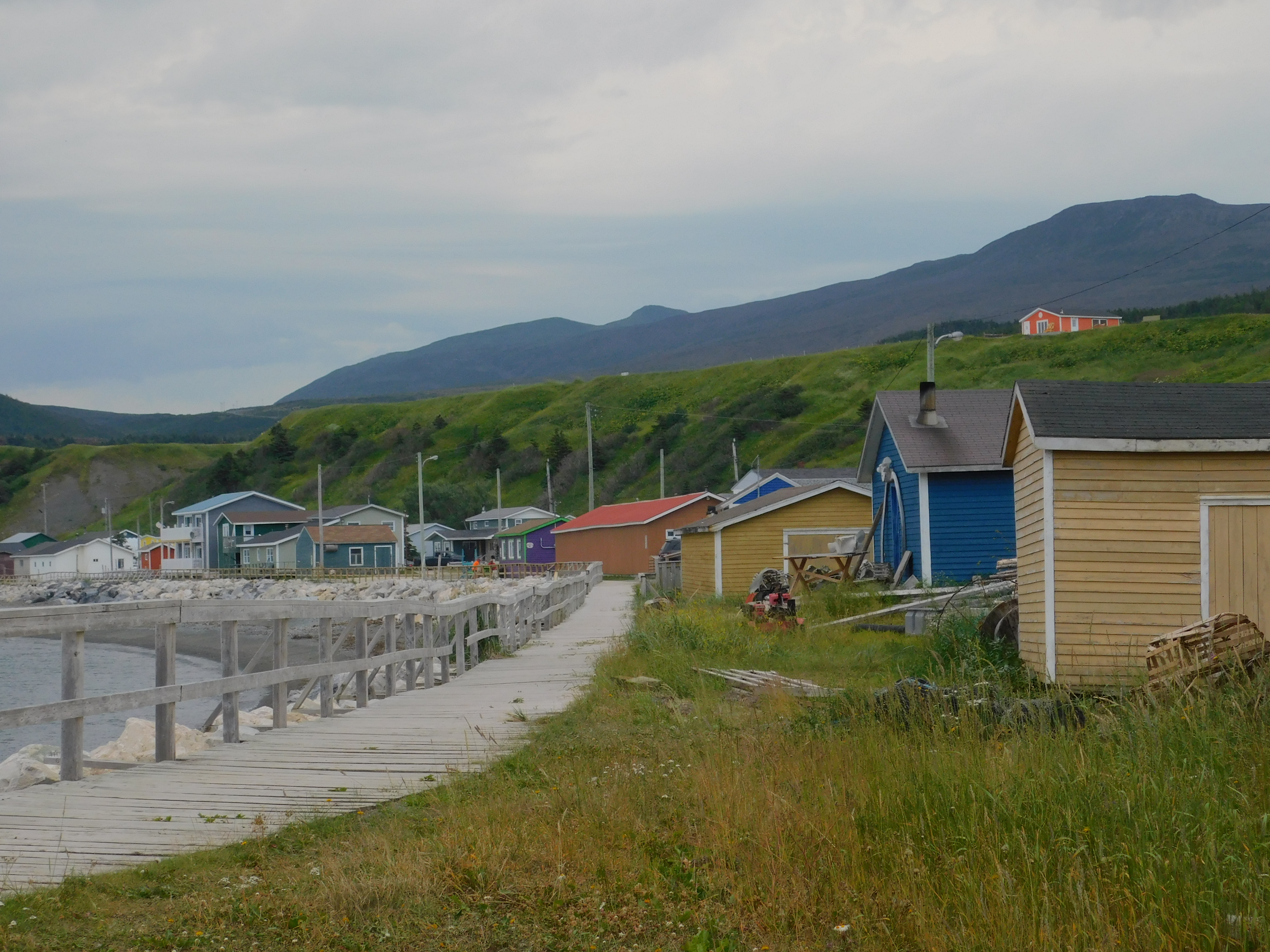
- Waterfront and boardwalk

- Location of Trout River in Newfoundland
- Coordinates: 49°29′52.46″N 58°07′32.38″W
- Country: Canada
- Province: Newfoundland and Labrador
- Settled: 1815
- Incorporated: 1966

Government
  - Mayor: Roger Hann (2025) outgoing Mayor Natalia Crocker (2021-2025)
  - Deputy Mayor: Marsha Crocker (2025) outgoing Deputy Nelson Barnes (2021-2025)

Population (2021)
  - Total: 508
- Time zone: UTC– 3:30 (Newfoundland Time)
  - Summer (DST): UTC– 2:30 (Newfoundland Daylight)
- Area code: 709
- Highways: Route 431
- Website: https://townoftroutriver.com

Trout River is a small rural fishing town located on the southern coastal edge of Gros Morne National Park in Newfoundland, near the Tablelands. Trout River was settled in 1815 by George Crocker and his family, who were its only inhabitants until 1880 who has many descendants still in Trout River and Chatham Ontario and many other areas in Canada and stretching out to his home country of England.

Trout River is also the birth place of Roy Payne and Music Legend In Folk Country and Newfoundland Music The community is served by Route 431.

Trout River is less than 10 minutes from the Tableland Mountains, part of the UNESCO World Heritage Site Gros Morne National Park.

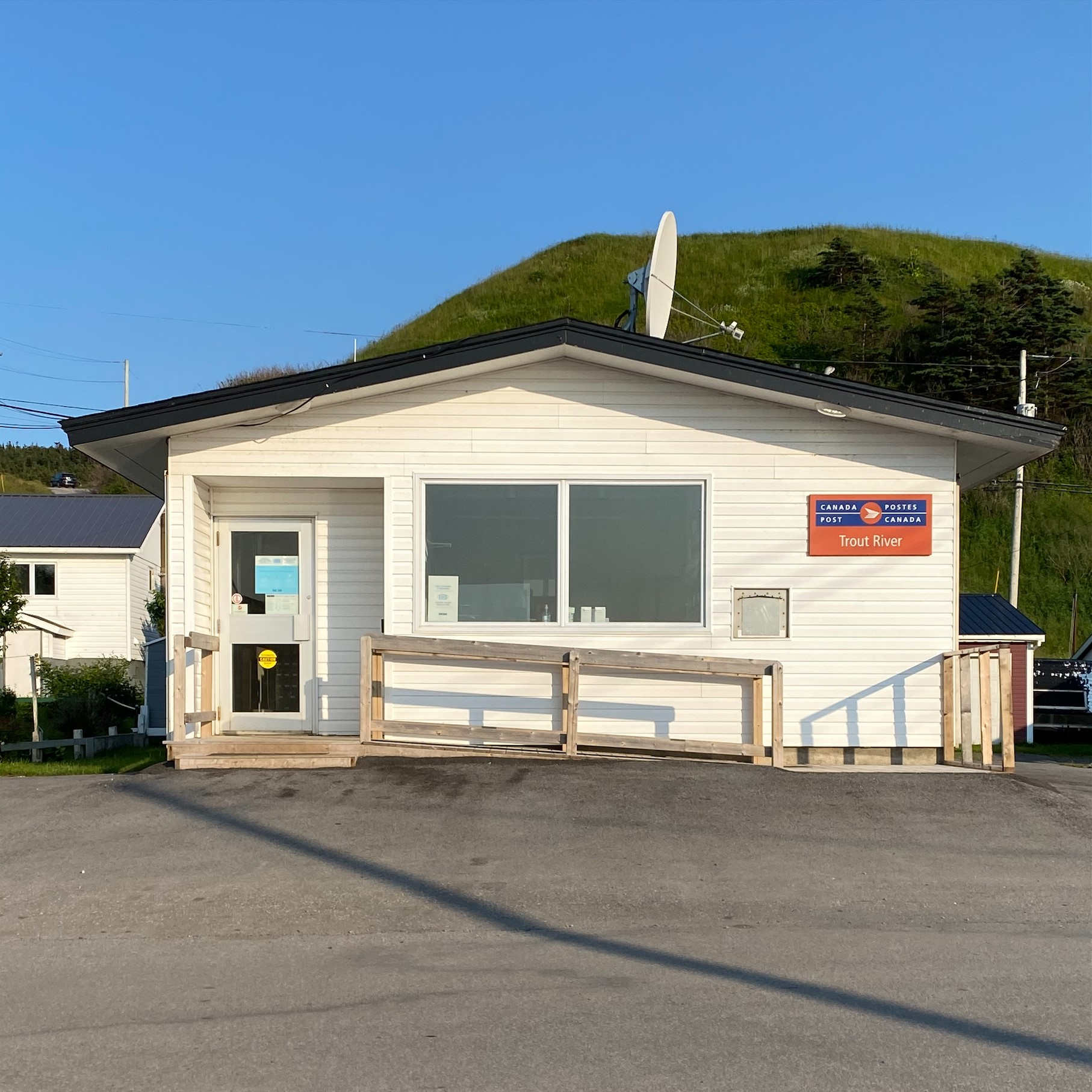
Local post office

This town is known for its sunsets over the water and boardwalk. It has many small hiking trails to take in and one of Gros Morne's longest hiking trails, 14 km return, The Trout River Pond Trail.

There is a large natural tower of rock, a sea stack, just south of the town.

In 2014, a blue whale carcass washed up along the shore in Trout River which attracted international attention. The skeleton of this whale was later put on display at the Royal Ontario Museum.

There are many other attractions in the small town like the elephant head mountain, many hiking trails and a sea stack referred to as the old man.

== Demographics ==
In the 2021 Census of Population conducted by Statistics Canada, Trout River had a population of 508 living in 210 of its 275 total private dwellings, a change of −8% from its 2016 population of 552. With a land area of 5.83 km^{2} (2.25 sq mi), it had a population density of 87.1/km^{2} (225.7/sq mi) in 2021.

Total Population 1996-2021
Year	Population	Change (%)
2021	508	-8.0
2016	552	-4.2
2011	576	-4.6
2006	604	-1.9
2001	616	-10.5
1996	688	-9.8
1991	763	--

== See also ==
- List of cities and towns in Newfoundland and Labrador
