= List of highways numbered 436 =

The following highways are numbered 436:

== Canada ==
- Newfoundland and Labrador Route 436

== Japan ==
- Japan National Route 436

== United States ==
- Florida State Road 436
- Louisiana Highway 436

- Louisiana Highway 436-1

- Maryland Route 436
- New York State Route 436
  - New York State Route 436 (former)
- Pennsylvania Route 436
- Puerto Rico Highway 436
- Wyoming Highway 436

Preceded by 435	Lists of highways 436	Succeeded by 437
