= Lomond, Newfoundland and Labrador =

Coordinates: 49°27′N 57°46′W

Lomond was a logging town in Newfoundland, Canada, located southeast of Woody Point near Bonne Bay. It developed out of the decline of the fishing industry in the area in the early 20th century and the rise of the logging and pulpwood industries. It was leveled for the creation of the Gros Morne National Park, all of its residents having been resettled as part of the Newfoundland government's general resettlement programme of the 1950s and 1960s. The park's Lomond campground is on the site of the town; by the end of the 20th century, the only structures there were park buildings.

== See also ==
- List of communities in Newfoundland and Labrador
