= Wiltondale =

Settlement in Newfoundland and Labrador, Canada

- Local service district
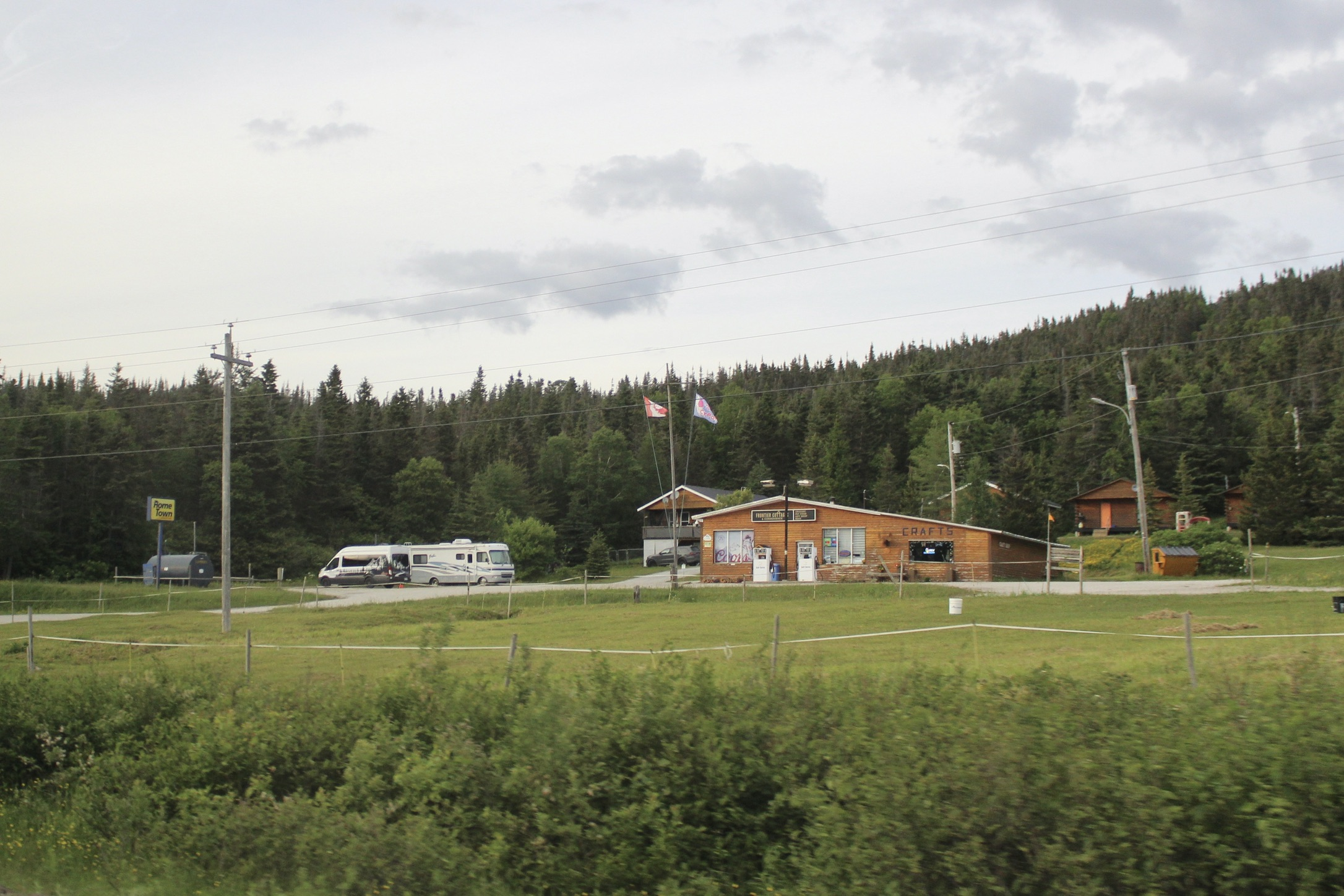
- Interactive map of Wiltondale
- Coordinates: 49°23′43″N 57°36′38″W
- Country: Canada
- Province: Newfoundland and Labrador
- Region: Western Newfoundland

Government
  - Type: Local service district
  - Governing body: Wiltondale LSD Committee
- Time zone: UTC−3:30 (Newfoundland Time Zone)
  - Summer (DST): UTC−2:30 (Newfoundland Daylight Time)
- Postal code: A0K 5P0
- Area code: 709
- Highways: Route 430

Wiltondale is a settlement on western Newfoundland in the Canadian province of Newfoundland and Labrador. It is located at the intersection between Route 430 (Great Northern Peninsula Highway/Viking Trail) and Route 431 (Bonne Bay Road).

In 1982 the population of Wiltondale was 63, the peak population of permanent residents in Wiltondale.
