= List of highways numbered 432 =

The following highways are numbered 432:

== Canada ==
- Manitoba Provincial Road 432
- Newfoundland and Labrador Route 432

== Japan ==
- Japan National Route 432

== United States ==
- Montana Secondary Highway 432
- New York State Route 432 (former)
  - New York State Route 432 (former)
- Puerto Rico Highway 432
- Texas:
  - Texas State Highway Loop 432 (former)
  - Farm to Market Road 432
- Virginia State Route 432 (former)
- Washington State Route 432
- Wyoming Highway 432

Preceded by 431	Lists of highways 432	Succeeded by 433
