= List of highways numbered 434 =

The following highways are numbered 434:

== Canada ==
- Manitoba Provincial Road 434
- Newfoundland and Labrador Route 434

== Japan ==
- Japan National Route 434

== United States ==
- Florida State Road 434
- Montana Secondary Highway 434
- New York State Route 434
  - New York State Route 434 (former)
- Pennsylvania Route 434
- Puerto Rico Highway 434
- Texas:
  - Texas State Highway Loop 434
  - Farm to Market Road 434
- Wyoming Highway 434

Preceded by 433	Lists of highways 434	Succeeded by 435
