= List of highways numbered 429 =

The following highways are numbered 429:

== Japan ==
- Japan National Route 429

== United States ==
- Florida State Road 429
- Nevada State Route 429
- New York State Route 429
- Oregon Route 429
- Puerto Rico Highway 429
- Tennessee State Route 429
- Virginia State Route 429 (former)

Preceded by 428	Lists of highways 429	Succeeded by 430
