= List of highways numbered 437 =

The following highways are numbered 437:

== Canada ==
- Newfoundland and Labrador Route 437

== Japan ==
- Japan National Route 437

== United States ==
- Florida State Road 437
- Louisiana Highway 437
- Maryland Route 437
- New York State Route 437
- Pennsylvania Route 437
- Puerto Rico Highway 437
- Tennessee State Route 437

Preceded by 436	Lists of highways 437	Succeeded by 438
