= Pissing Mare Falls =

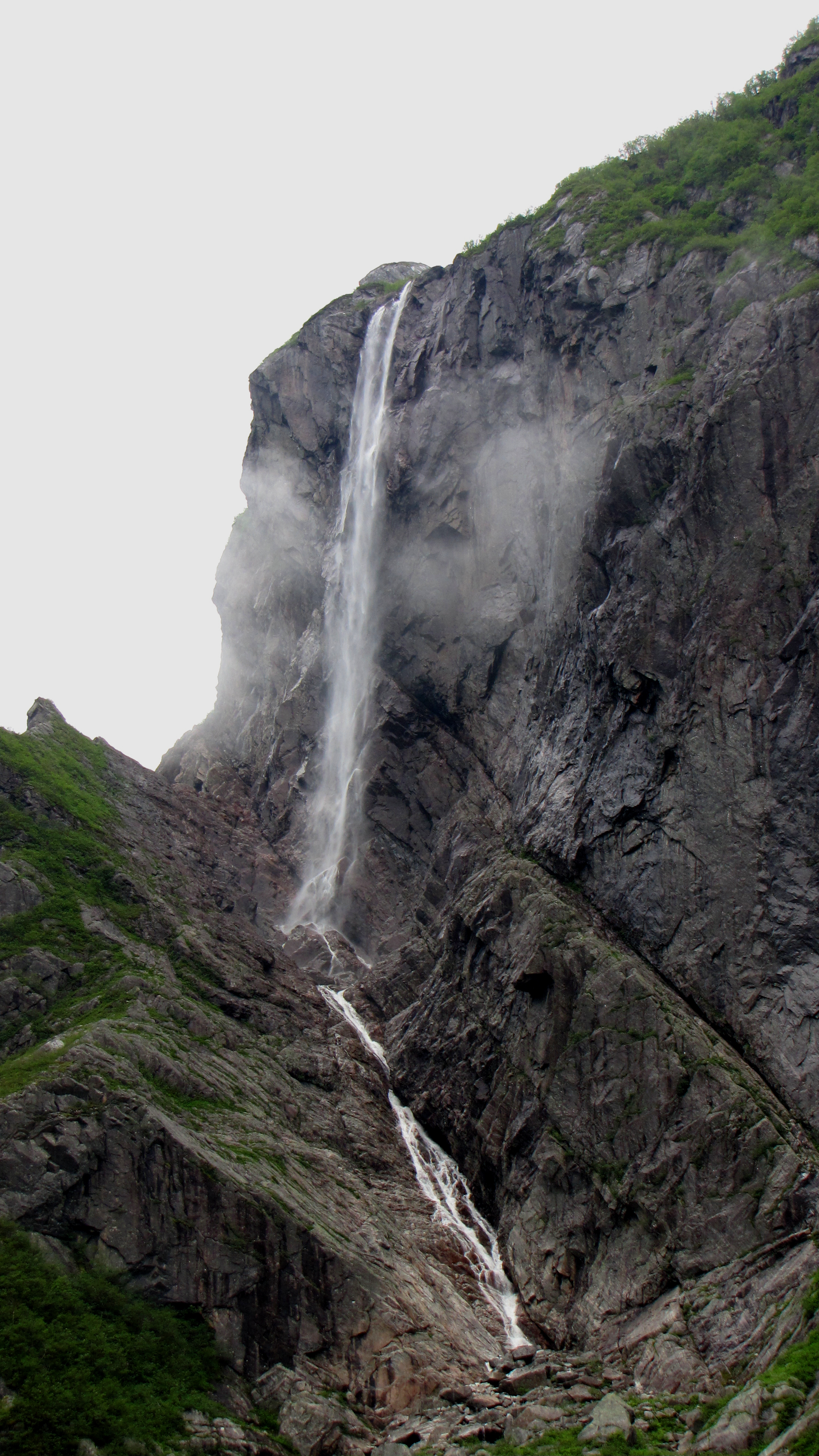
- Detail of the top of the falls
- Interactive map of Pissing Mare Falls
- Location: Gros Morne National Park, Newfoundland and Labrador, Canada
- Coordinates: 49°42′37″N 57°39′39″W
- Type: Tiered Plunges
- Total height: 343 m (1,125 ft)
- Number of drops: 2
- Longest drop: 250 m (820 ft)
- Watercourse: Burnt Woods Brook

Pissing Mare Falls is a tiered waterfall in Gros Morne National Park, Newfoundland, Canada. It is formed from Burnt Woods Brook, which plunges over the edge of Big Level Plateau into Western Brook Pond. At 343 m (1,125 ft) high, with an unbroken drop of 250 m (820 ft), it is the highest in the province, and the 31st highest in Canada.

== See also ==
- List of waterfalls
- List of waterfalls of Canada
