= List of highways numbered 433 =

The following highways are numbered 433:

== Canada ==
- Manitoba Provincial Road 433
- Newfoundland and Labrador Route 433

== Japan ==
- Japan National Route 433

== United States ==
- Louisiana Highway 433
- New York State Route 433
  - New York State Route 433 (former)
  - New York State Route 433 (former)
- Pennsylvania Route 433
- Puerto Rico Highway 433
- Washington State Route 433
- Wyoming Highway 433

Preceded by 432	Lists of highways 433	Succeeded by 434
