= List of highways numbered 439 =

The following highways are numbered 439:

== Japan ==
- Japan National Route 439

== United States ==
- Florida State Road 439
- County Road 439 (Hernando County, Florida)
- Louisiana Highway 439
- Maryland Route 439
- Nevada State Route 439
- New Jersey Route 439
- New York State Route 439 (former)
  - New York State Route 439A (former)
- Pennsylvania Route 439 (former)
- Puerto Rico Highway 439

Preceded by 438	Lists of highways 439	Succeeded by 440
