= List of highways numbered 426 =

The following highways are numbered 426:

== Japan ==
- Japan National Route 426

== United States ==
- Florida:
  - Florida State Road 426
    - Florida State Road 426A (former)
  - County Road 426 (Seminole County, Florida) (unsigned)
    - County Road 426A (Seminole County, Florida)
- Louisiana Highway 426
- Maryland Route 426
- Nevada State Route 426
- New York State Route 426
- Pennsylvania Route 426
- Puerto Rico Highway 426

Preceded by 425	Lists of highways 426	Succeeded by 427
