= List of highways numbered 438 =

The following highways are numbered 438:

== Canada ==
- Newfoundland and Labrador Route 438

== Japan ==
- Japan National Route 438

== United States ==
- Florida State Road 438
- Iowa Highway 438
- Louisiana Highway 438
- Maryland Route 438
- New York State Route 438
- Pennsylvania Route 438
- Puerto Rico Highway 438

Preceded by 437	Lists of highways 438	Succeeded by 439
