= List of highways numbered 427 =

The following highways are numbered 427:

== Canada ==
- Manitoba Provincial Road 427
- Ontario Highway 427

== India ==
- National Highway 427 (India)

== Japan ==
- Japan National Route 427

== United States ==
- County Road 427 (Seminole County, Florida)
- Indiana State Road 427
  - County Road 427 (DeKalb County, Indiana)
- Nevada State Route 427
- New York State Route 427
  - New York State Route 427 (former)
- Pennsylvania Route 427
- Puerto Rico Highway 427
- Texas State Highway Loop 427 (former)

Preceded by 426	Lists of highways 427	Succeeded by 428
