= List of highways numbered 428 =

The following highways are numbered 428:

== Canada ==
- Manitoba Provincial Road 428

== Japan ==
- Japan National Route 428

== United States ==
- Louisiana Highway 428
- Maryland Route 428
- Nevada State Route 428 (former)
- New York State Route 428 (former)
- Pennsylvania Route 428
- Puerto Rico Highway 428

Preceded by 427	Lists of highways 428	Succeeded by 429
