= List of highways numbered 425 =

The following highways are numbered 425:

== Canada ==
- Manitoba Provincial Road 425
- New Brunswick Route 425
- Newfoundland and Labrador Route 425
- Ontario Highway 425

== Japan ==
- Japan National Route 425

== United States ==
- Interstate 425 (former)
- U.S. Route 425
- Florida State Road 425
- County Road 425 (Orange County, Florida)
- County Road 425 (Seminole County, Florida)
- Kentucky Route 425
- Louisiana Highway 425 (former)
- Maryland Route 425
- Nevada State Route 425
- New York State Route 425
- Pennsylvania Route 425
- Puerto Rico Highway 425
- Texas:
  - Texas State Highway Loop 425 (former)
  - Texas State Highway Spur 425 (former)
  - Texas Farm to Market Road 425
- Virginia State Route 425 (former)

Preceded by 424	Lists of highways 425	Succeeded by 426
