= Woody Point, Newfoundland and Labrador =

Woody Point
- Town
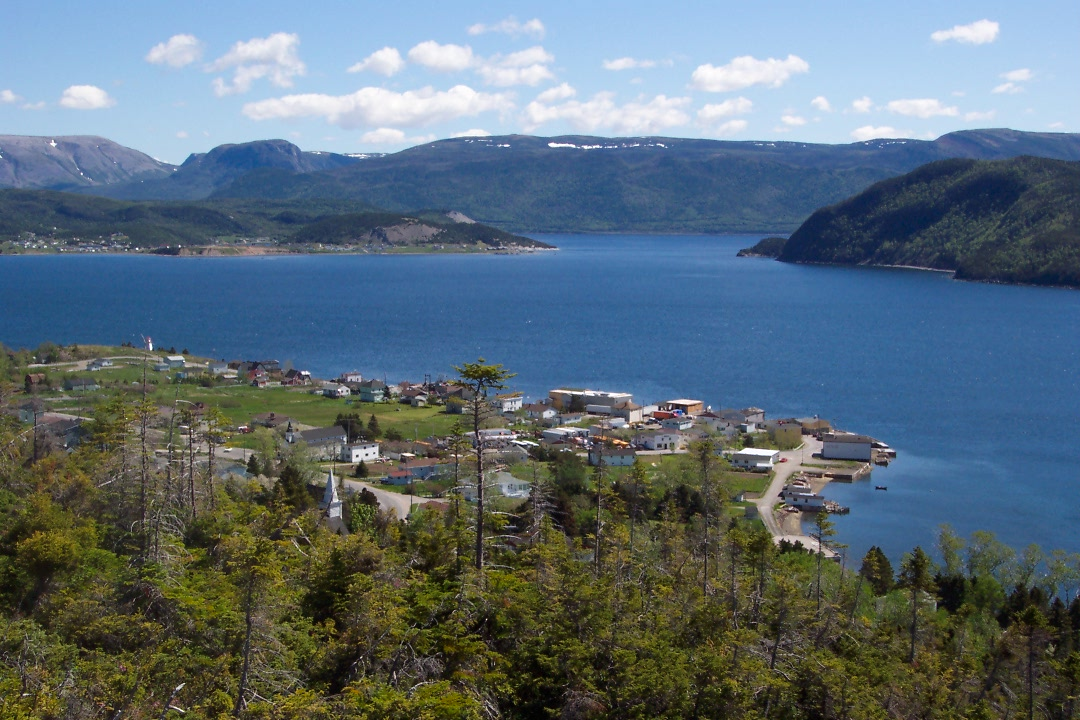
- Woody Point from lookout

- Location of Woody Point in Newfoundland
- Coordinates: 49°30′N 57°56′W
- Country: Canada
- Province: Newfoundland and Labrador
- Settled: 1849
- Incorporated: 1956

Area
  - Total: 2.91 km^{2} (1.12 sq mi)
- Elevation: 25 m (82 ft)

Population (2021)
  - Total: 244
  - Density: 83.8/km^{2} (217/sq mi)
- Time zone: UTC−3:30 (Newfoundland Time)
  - Summer (DST): UTC−2:30 (Newfoundland Daylight)
- Postal code span: A0K
- Area code: 709
- Highways: Route 431
- Woody Point lighthouse
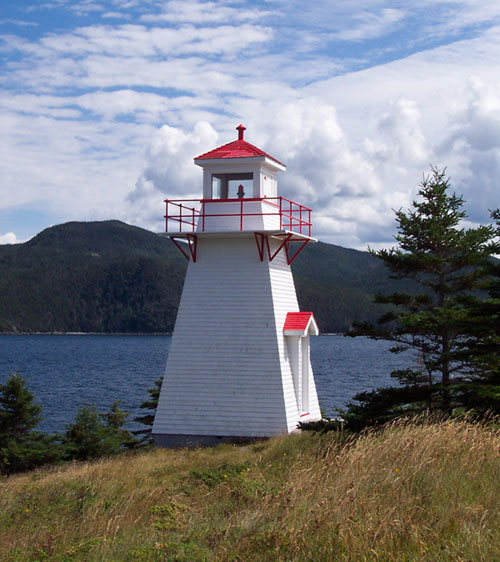
- Woody Point Lighthouse in 2006
- Constructed: 1919 (first); 1952 (second)
- Construction: structural wood (tower)
- Height: 6 m (20 ft)
- Shape: square frustum tower with balcony and lantern
- Markings: White (tower), red (roof)
- Power source: solar power
- Operator: Canadian Coast Guard
- Heritage: heritage lighthouse, municipal heritage site
- First lit: 1959 (current)
- Focal height: 14 m (46 ft)
- Range: 4 nmi (7.4 km; 4.6 mi)
- Characteristic: Fl R 4s

Woody Point is a town located in the heart of Gros Morne National Park, on the western coast of Newfoundland. Situated on Bonne Bay, the Town of Woody Point encompasses three areas: Curzon Village, Woody Point and Winterhouse Brook. It has a total population of 244 residents. The downtown section of Woody Point is a Registered Heritage District, and the community has a waterfront with many heritage buildings and four Registered Heritage Structures recognized by Heritage Foundation of Newfoundland and Labrador. The community is served by Route 431.

== History ==
=== French Shore ===
Europeans were slow to settle the west coast of Newfoundland. The British were concentrated on the east coast, and the French were on the Grand Banks. The 1713 Treaty of Utrecht gave the French some area on the west coast which was extended in 1783 to the entire coast.

British settlement was spreading, as well. In 1800 the first British settlement in the Bonne Bay area occurred in Woody Point with the establishment of the firm of Joseph Bird from Sturminster Newton. He had an agent and premises to serve the British fishing interests which were principally migratory at this point. When fishermen began to stay during the winter rather than return to England, the pattern for permanent settlement was laid.

By 1904, the French had left the area to pursue fisheries farther up the coast. By this time, Woody Point was bustling. It was considered the capital of the area with banking and customs offices, merchants, and a harbour full of domestic and foreign vessels.

=== First settlers ===
John Roberts and his wife, Emma, together with their four children are considered to be the first settlers of Woody Point. They came in 1849. By 1872, there were 129 families residing in the Bonne Bay area.

In 1873, the Bonne Bay Post Office was established in the home of J.R. Roberts, John Roberts' nephew. This house was one of the first built in the area and is still standing today. It is a blue clapboarded structure on the Shore Road left of the downtown. Plans are being made to restore this house.

Solomon Wilton was the second settler to Woody Point. It was Wilton who donated the land on which the present day Church of the Epiphany was built. A school and parsonage once stood on this spot. These early founding families are laid to rest in the Anglican cemetery on Shore Road.

=== Major events ===
In 1908, Lord Nelson Loyal Orange Lodge #149 was built. It was built to serve as the fraternal hall for Orange Order members and navigational aid for fishermen. It was used for local social events in Bonne Bay for nearly a century. In the 1990's it was purchased and restored by local musician Charlie Payne. In 1998 it became a Registered Heritage Structure. It currently operates as the Woody Point Heritage Theatre, the primary venue for the annual summer event 'Writers at Woody Point' literary festival.

In 1922, when Woody Point was experiencing the height of its population and commercial success, a devastating fire ripped through the downtown. The wind quickly carried the flames which shot all the way across the Bay to Norris Point. In all, 58 buildings were destroyed. The degree of commerce in the town never returned to the pre-fire level.

Most of the buildings currently on the waterfront date from after 1922, but there are some exceptions. The lighthouse was built in 1919. Also, the large grey and green house to the right of the Seaside Deli was built in the 1890s. This house was the scene of a riot in 1938.

== Gallery ==
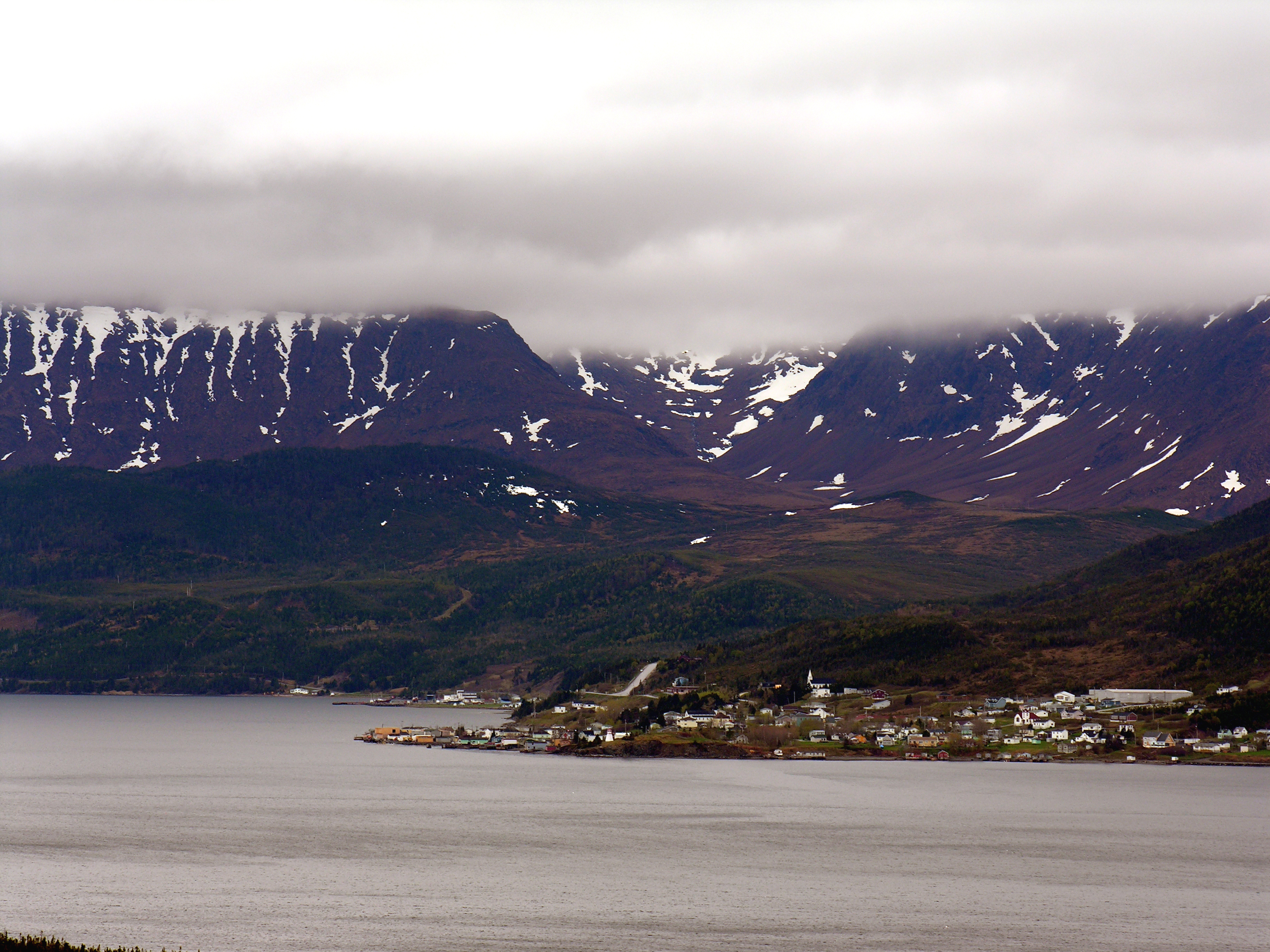
View from Norris Point

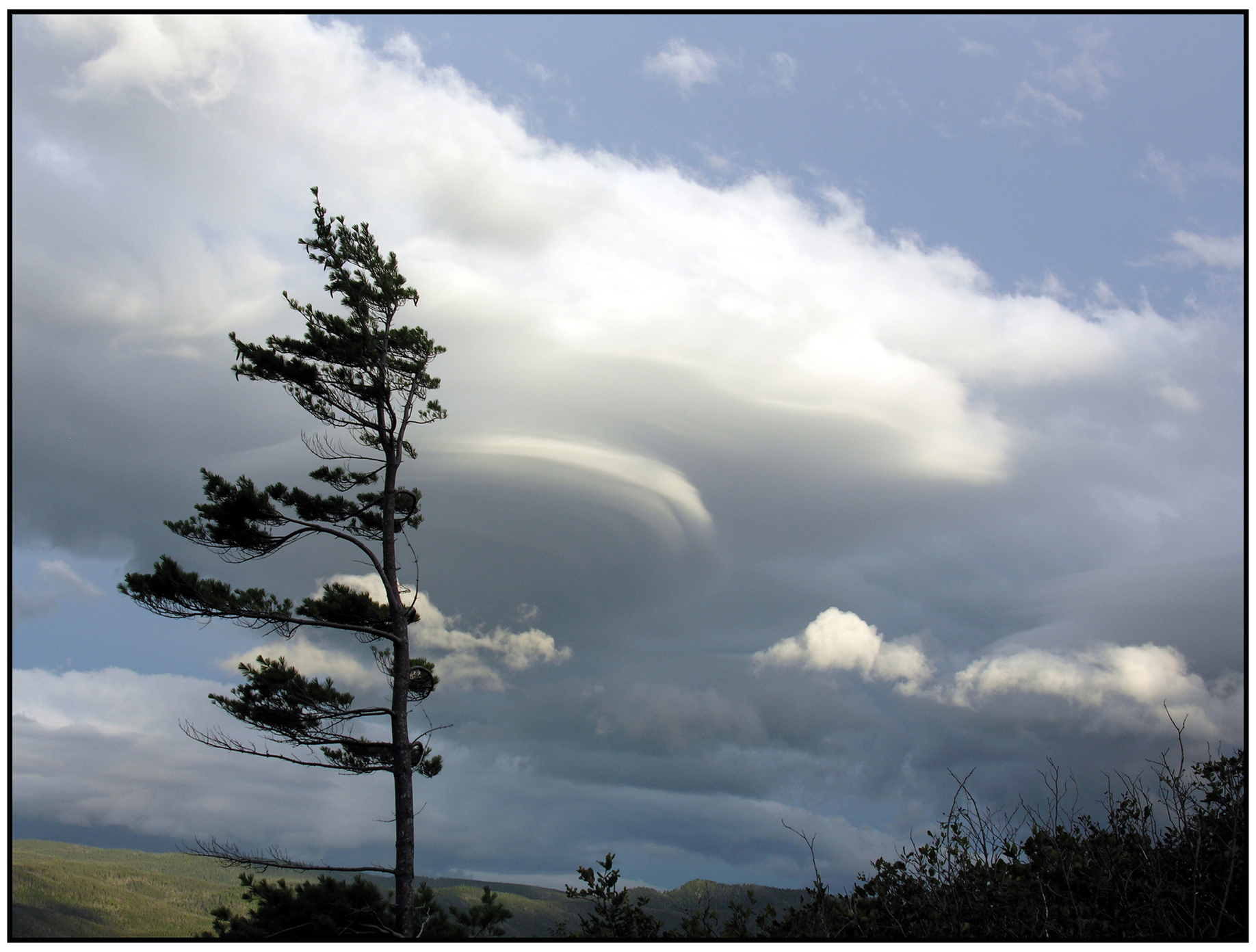
August sky over the table lands

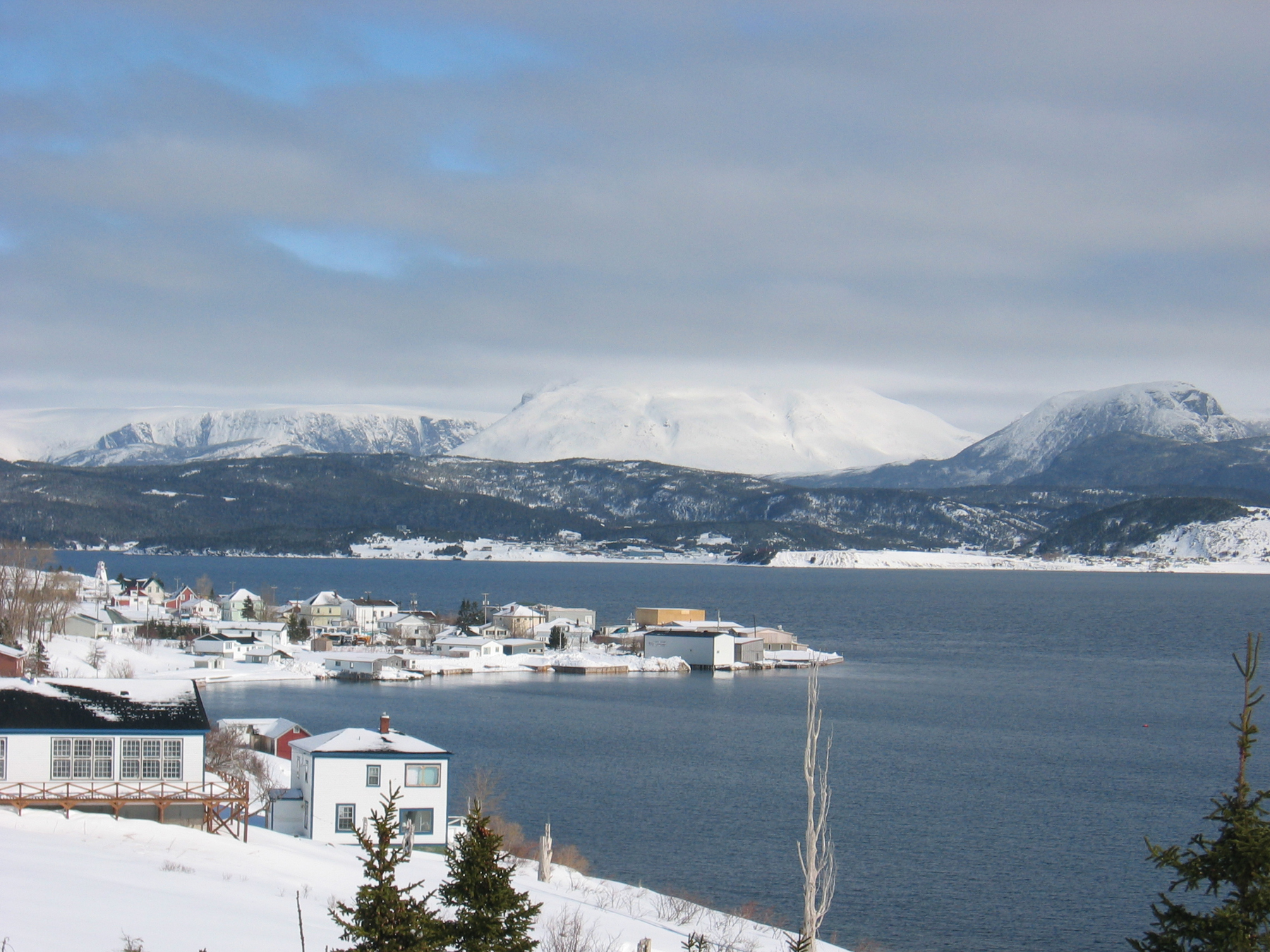
Winter in Woody Point

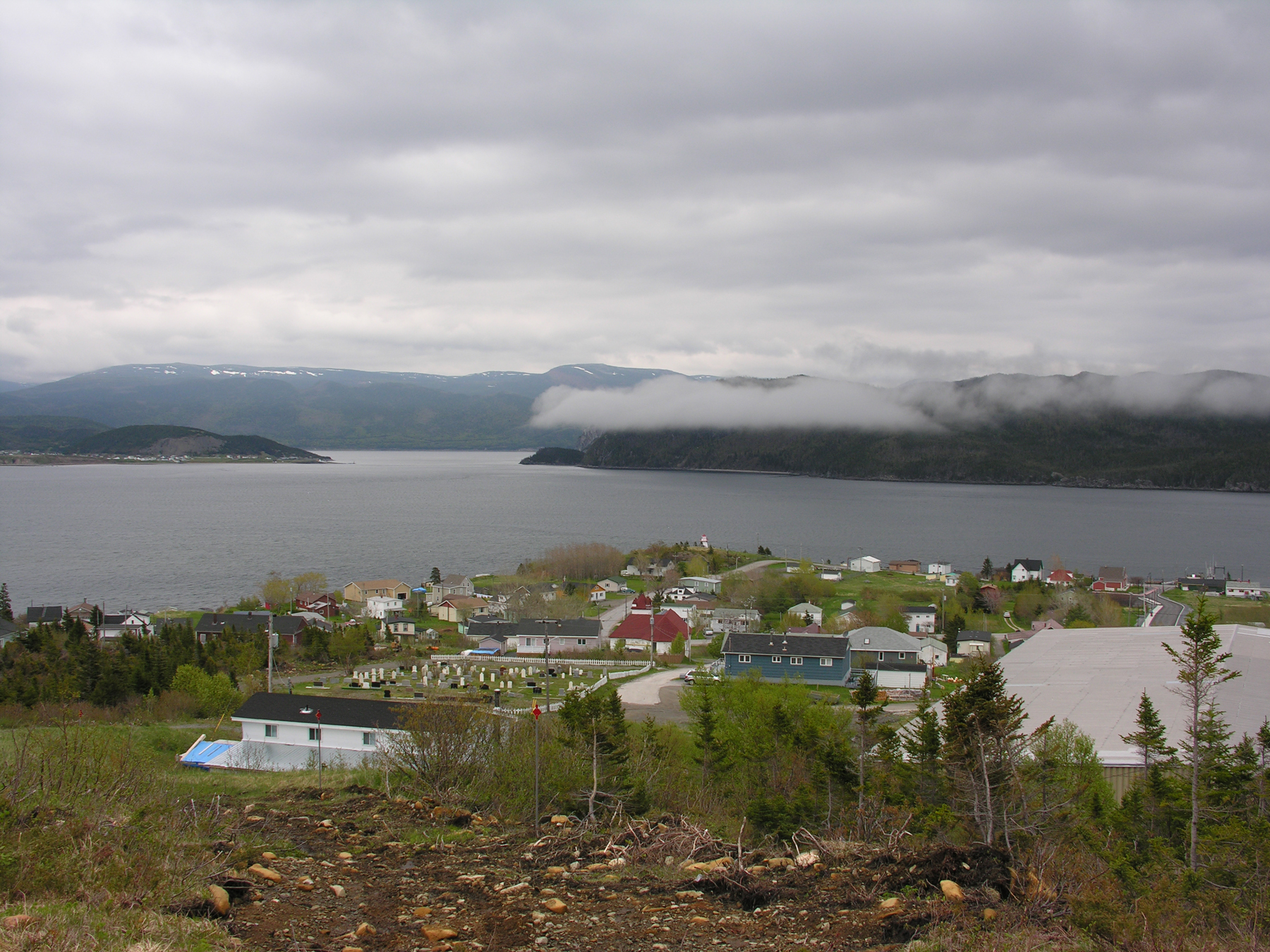
Bonne Bay

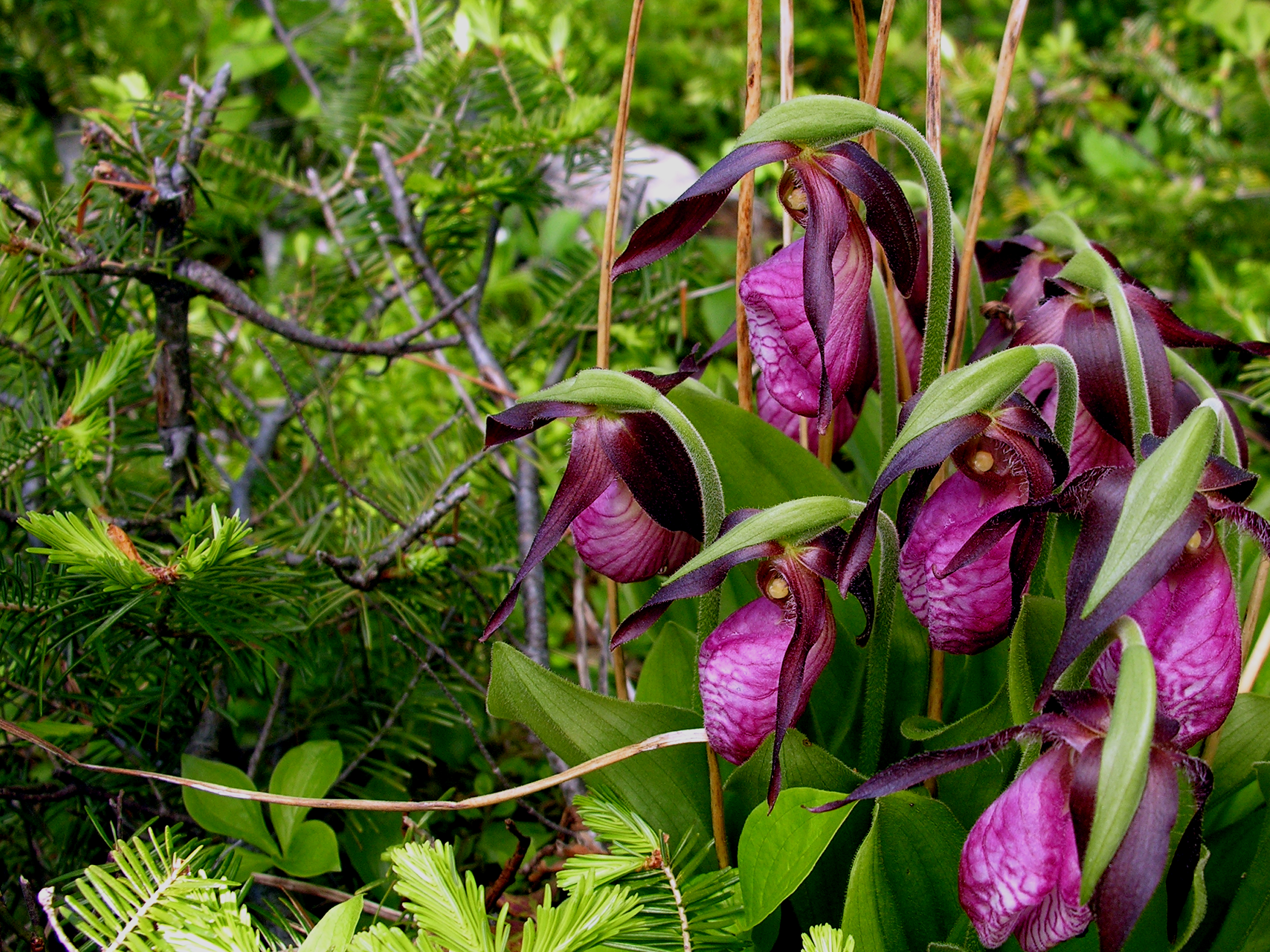
Spring Orchids

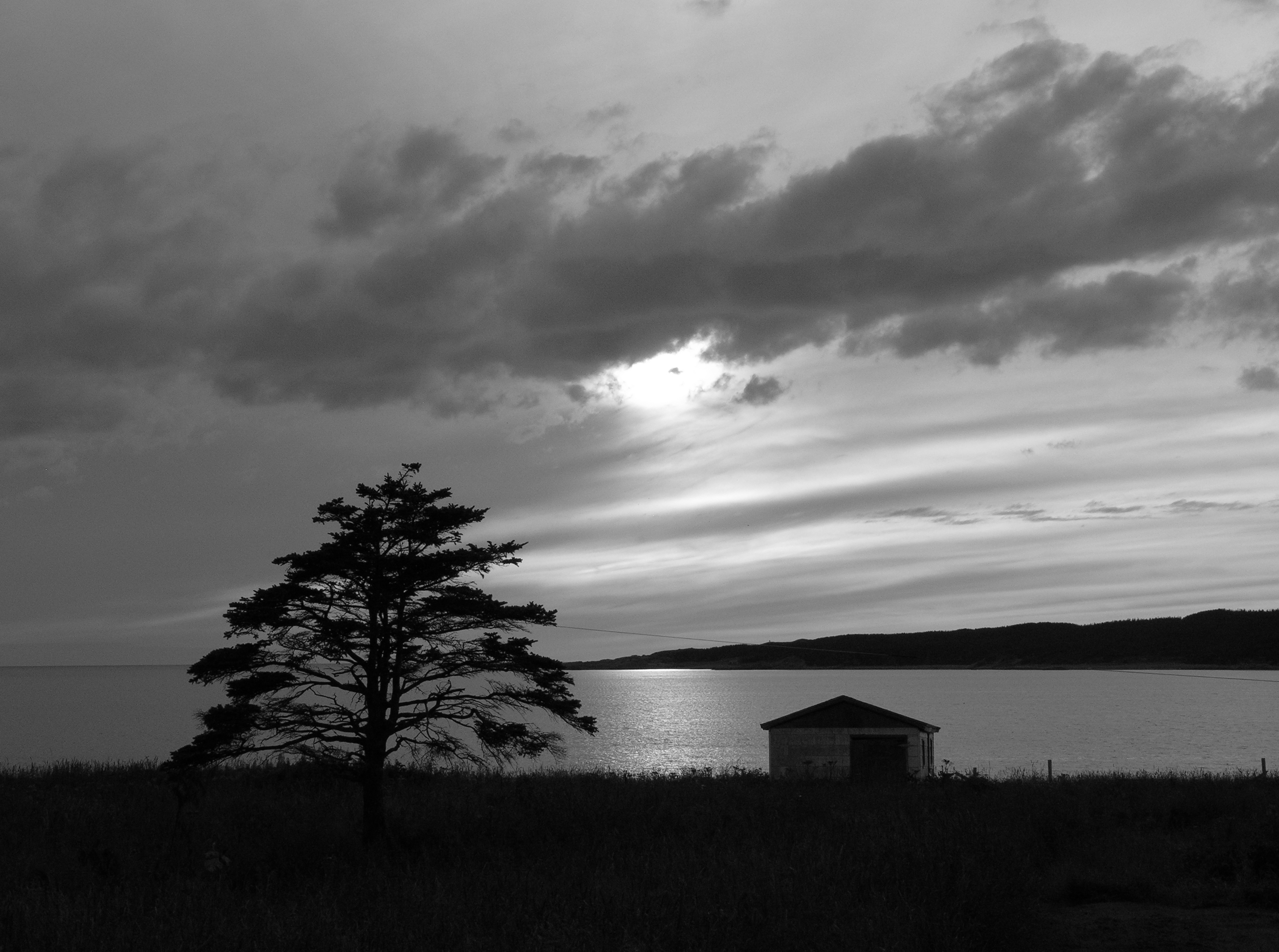
Sunset on Bonne Bay

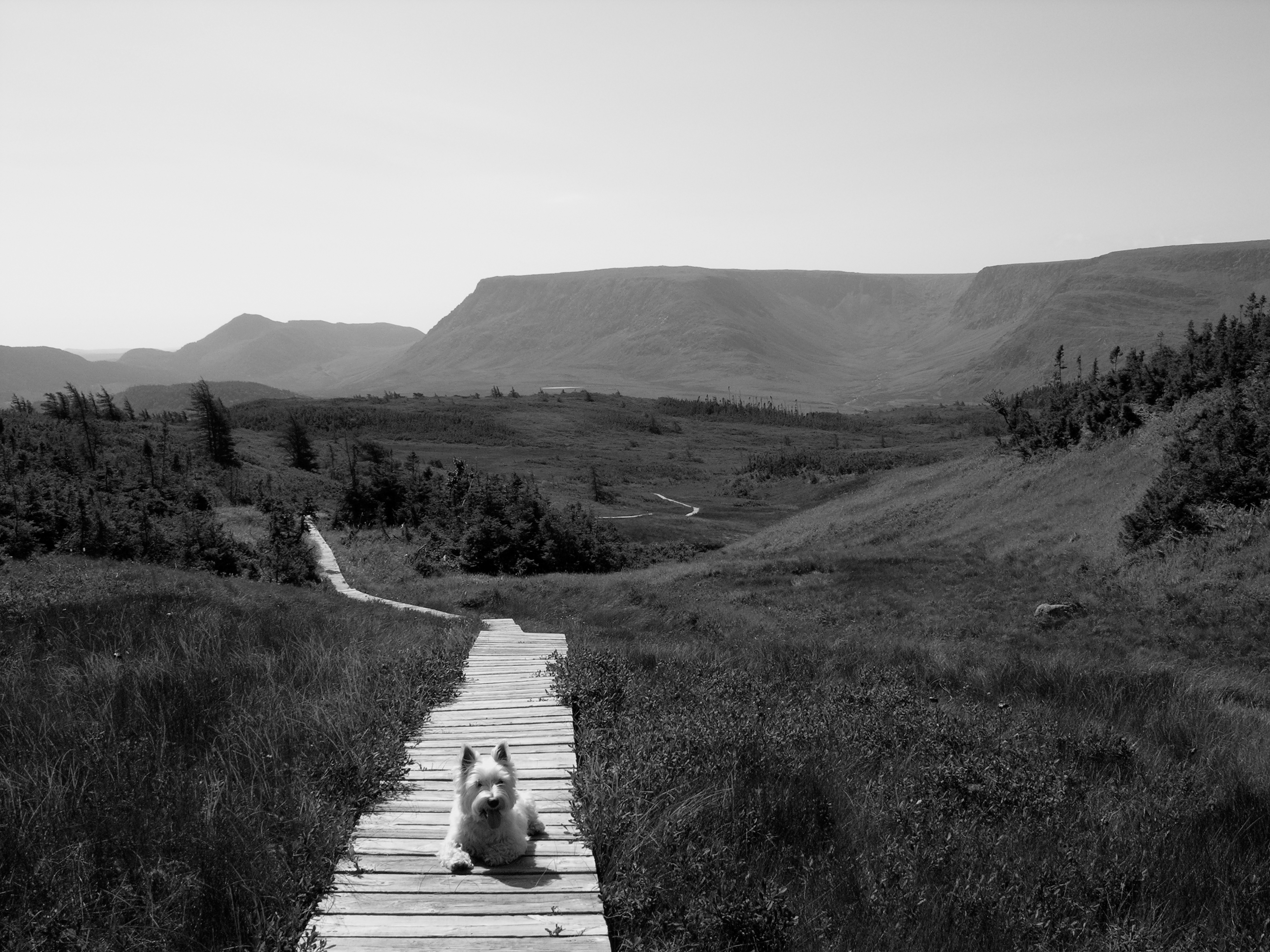
A dog on the path to the Lookout

Lighthouse in fog

Rocks at Green Point

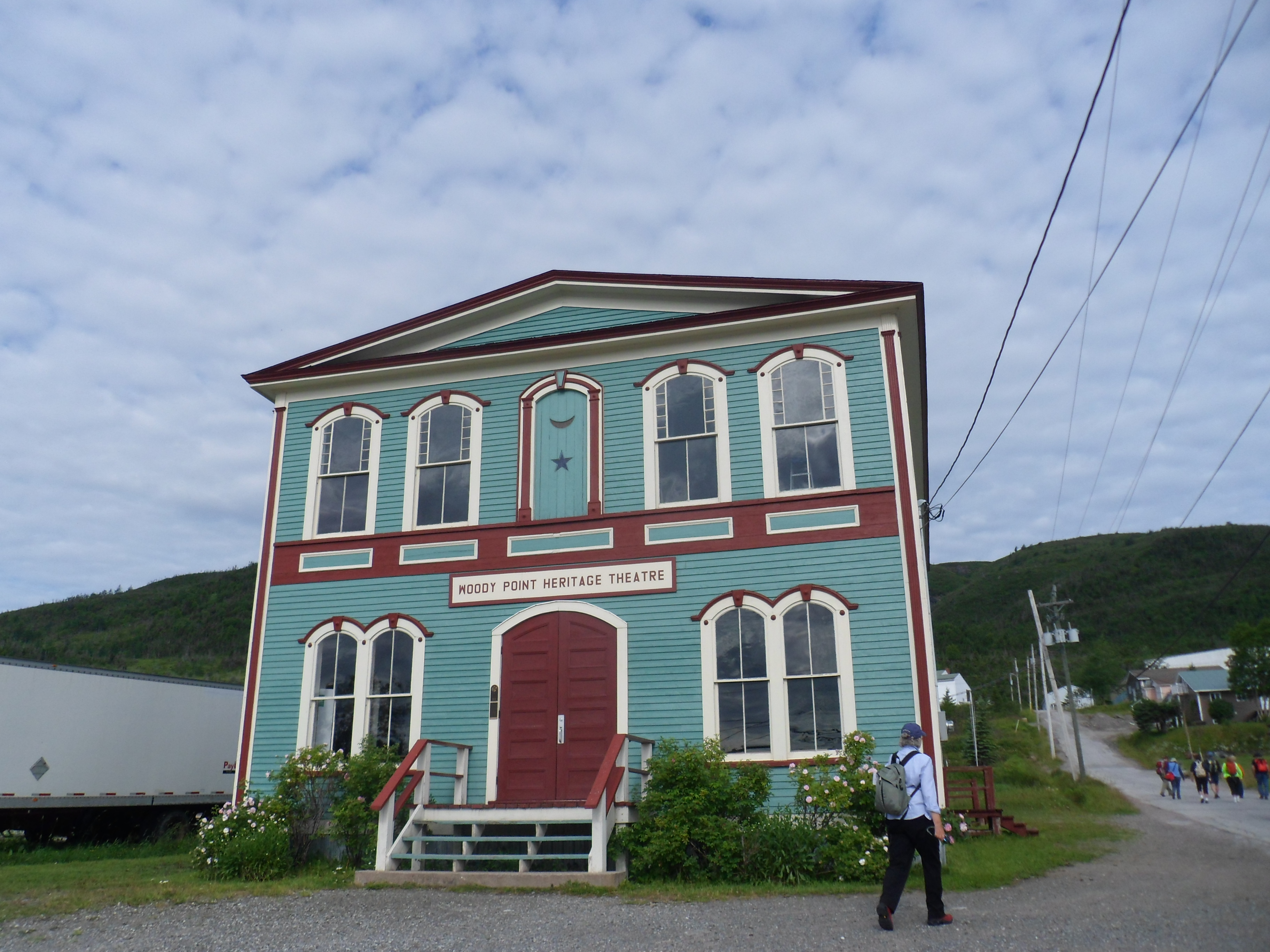
Woody Point Orange Lodge

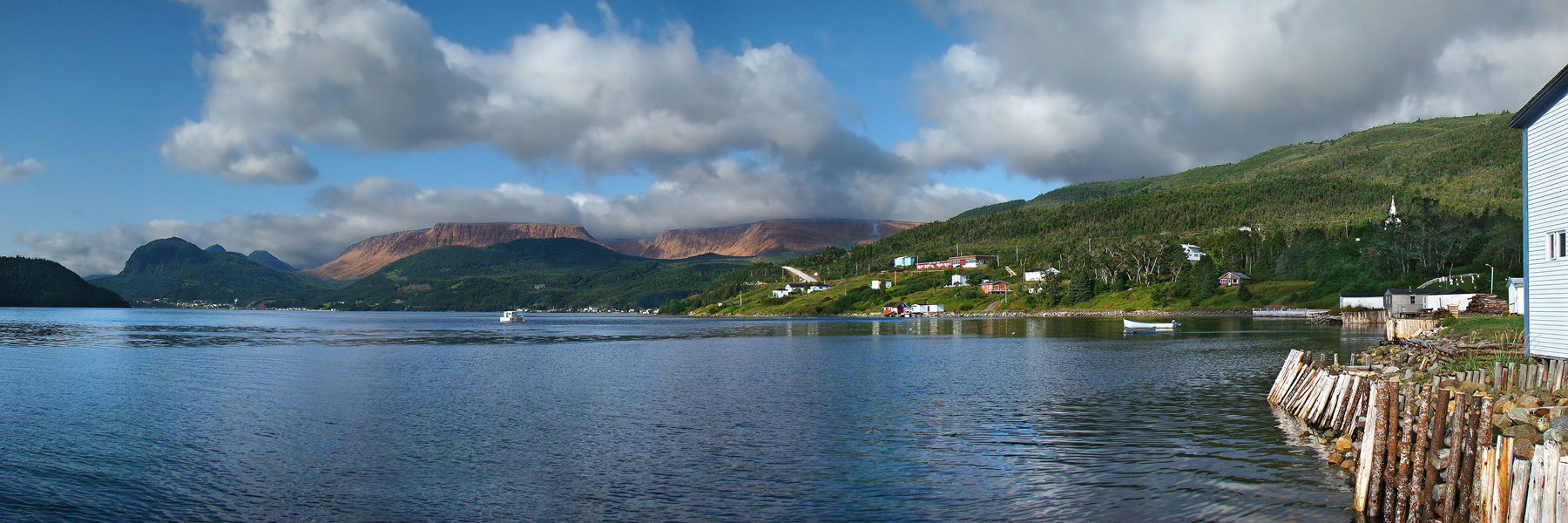
Gros Morne National Park overlooking Bonne Bay in Woody Point

== Geography and Climate ==
Woody Point is underlain by a bedrock of mélange, with metagabbro and related rock on higher areas. Soils of the community and its surrounding region have been placed in the Serpentine Cove association of Brunisols developed on mafic or ultramafic parent material. Woody Point has a humid continental climate (Köppen Dfb) with extremely high winter snowfall and a strong winter seasonal lag, causing February to be the clearly coldest month. Summers are moderated by its seaside position, whereas precipitation remains high year round and rainfall is occurring during milder spells during winters. Woody Point is the snowiest year round inhabited place in Canada.

Climate data for Woody Point
Month	Jan	Feb	Mar	Apr	May	Jun	Jul	Aug	Sep	Oct	Nov	Dec	Year
Record high °C (°F)	15 (59)	12.8 (55.0)	16.5 (61.7)	22.5 (72.5)	25 (77)	27 (81)	29.5 (85.1)	30.6 (87.1)	27 (81)	22 (72)	18.5 (65.3)	16.1 (61.0)	30.6 (87.1)
Mean daily maximum °C (°F)	−3.5 (25.7)	−4.4 (24.1)	0 (32)	5.4 (41.7)	10.9 (51.6)	16.2 (61.2)	20.2 (68.4)	19.9 (67.8)	15.6 (60.1)	9.6 (49.3)	4.4 (39.9)	−0.7 (30.7)	7.8 (46.0)
Mean daily minimum °C (°F)	−10.7 (12.7)	−12.6 (9.3)	−8.6 (16.5)	−1.8 (28.8)	2.6 (36.7)	7.6 (45.7)	11.9 (53.4)	12.1 (53.8)	8.3 (46.9)	3.3 (37.9)	−1.1 (30.0)	−7 (19)	0.3 (32.5)
Record low °C (°F)	−25 (−13)	−31 (−24)	−31 (−24)	−18 (0)	−7.2 (19.0)	−1 (30)	2.8 (37.0)	2.8 (37.0)	−1.7 (28.9)	−6.7 (19.9)	−13 (9)	−22.5 (−8.5)	−31 (−24)
Average precipitation mm (inches)	230.9 (9.09)	128.3 (5.05)	99.4 (3.91)	68.6 (2.70)	80.2 (3.16)	113 (4.4)	112 (4.4)	124.9 (4.92)	133.7 (5.26)	163.2 (6.43)	168.9 (6.65)	197.6 (7.78)	1,620.7 (63.81)
Average rainfall mm (inches)	28.1 (1.11)	17.1 (0.67)	30.5 (1.20)	47.2 (1.86)	76.2 (3.00)	113.0 (4.45)	112.0 (4.41)	124.9 (4.92)	133.7 (5.26)	160.5 (6.32)	119.8 (4.72)	35.0 (1.38)	998 (39.3)
Average snowfall cm (inches)	202.8 (79.8)	111.2 (43.8)	68.8 (27.1)	21.4 (8.4)	4.0 (1.6)	0.0 (0.0)	0.0 (0.0)	0.0 (0.0)	0.0 (0.0)	2.8 (1.1)	49.1 (19.3)	162.6 (64.0)	622.7 (245.1)
Average precipitation days (≥ 0.2 mm)	26.0	19.1	14.9	11.2	12.3	13.2	14.7	14.2	15.8	18.2	20.1	23.5	203.2
Average rainy days (≥ 0.2 mm)	3.5	2.4	4.5	7.5	11.6	13.2	14.7	14.2	15.8	17.8	12.4	5.0	122.6
Average snowy days (≥ 0.2 cm)	23.8	17.7	11.8	4.5	0.8	0.0	0.0	0.0	0.0	0.8	9.2	20.0	88.6
Source: Environment Canada

== Demographics ==
In the 2021 Census of Population conducted by Statistics Canada, Woody Point, Bonne Bay had a population of 244 living in 129 of its 207 total private dwellings, a change of −13.5% from its 2016 population of 282. With a land area of 3.78 km^{2} (1.46 sq mi), it had a population density of 64.6/km^{2} (167.2/sq mi) in 2021.

== Arts and culture ==
Woody Point is home to the Writers at Woody Point festival and Gros Morne Summer Music. It is held at the Lord Nelson Orange Lodge. Woody Point featured in season six of the television program Still Standing.

== See also ==
- List of lighthouses in Canada
