= Western Brook Pond =

Fjord or lake in Newfoundland and Labrador, Canada

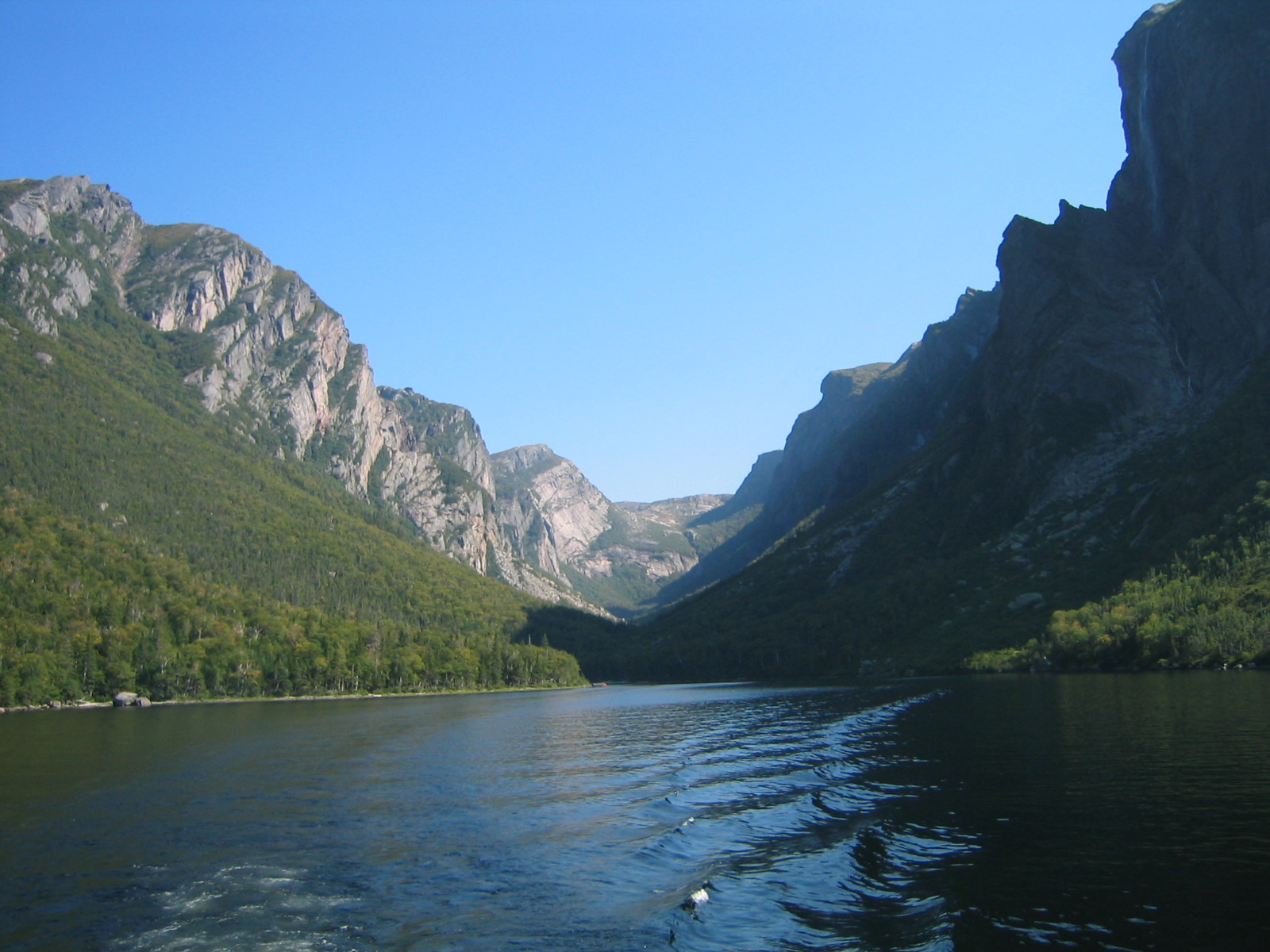

- Location in Newfoundland and Labrador
- Location: Gros Morne National Park, Newfoundland, Newfoundland and Labrador
- Coordinates: 49°46′08″N 57°49′14″W
- Type: Fjord
- Primary inflows: Stag Brook
- Primary outflows: Western Brook
- Catchment area: 171 km^{2} (66 sq mi)
- Basin countries: Canada
- Max. length: 16 km (9.9 mi)
- Surface area: 23 km^{2} (8.9 sq mi)
- Average depth: 72.5 m (238 ft)
- Max. depth: 165 m (541 ft)
- Residence time: 15.4 years
- Shore length^{1}: 42.5 km (26.4 mi)
- ^{1} Shore length is not a well-defined measure.

Western Brook Pond is a Canadian fjord or lake located in Gros Morne National Park on the west coast of the island of Newfoundland. It is in the Long Range Mountains, the most northern section of the Appalachian Mountains.

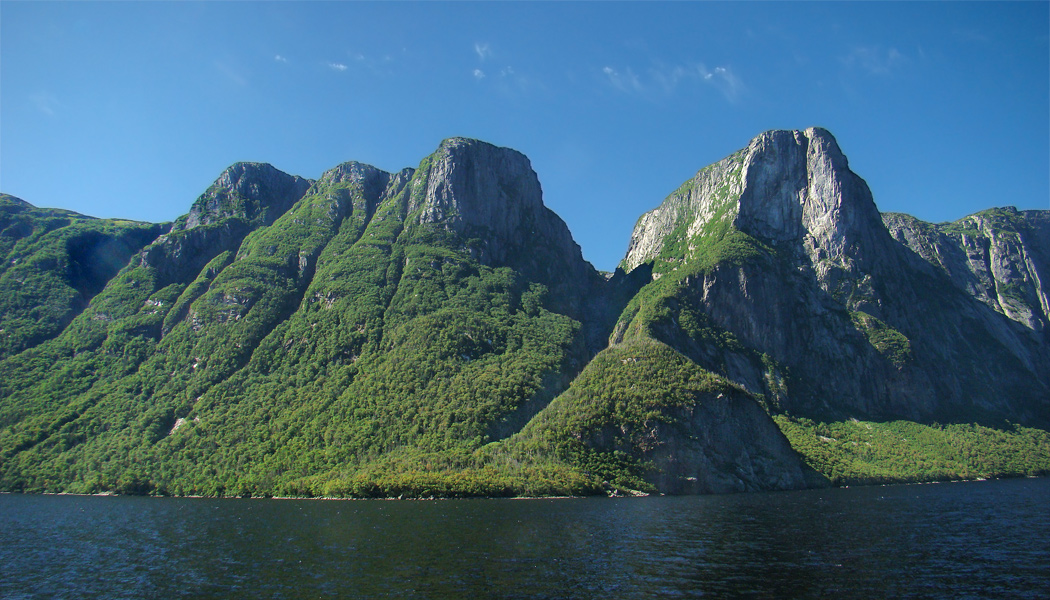
Rock walls

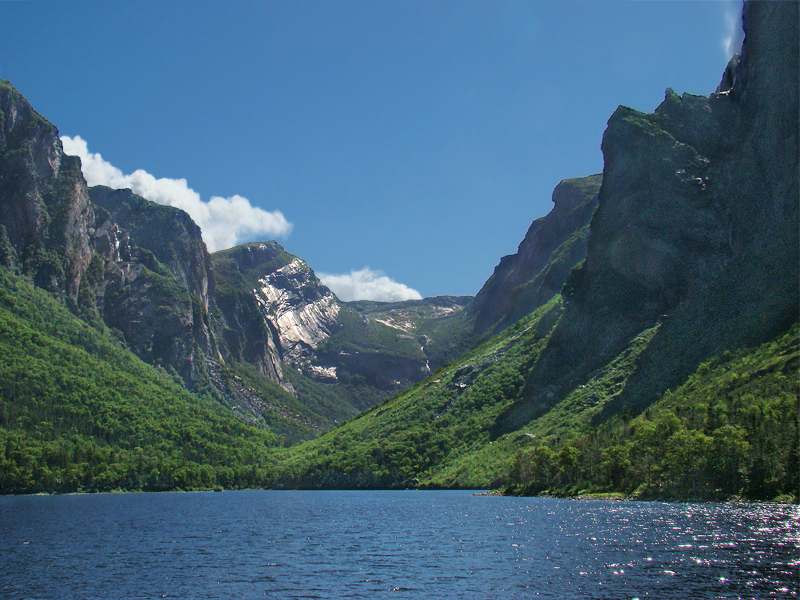
Eastern dead end

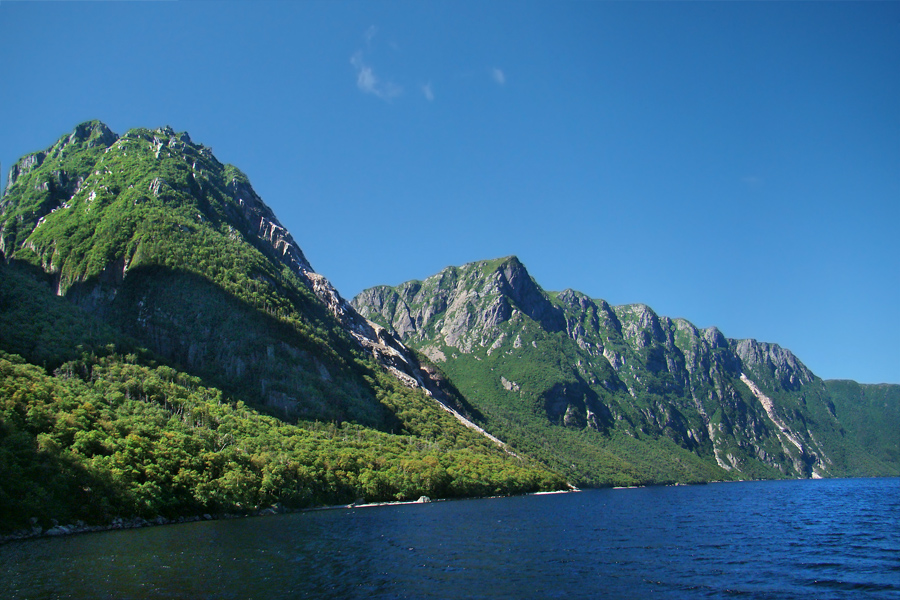
Rock walls

It is surrounded by steep rock walls 600 m (2,000 ft) high, having been carved from the surrounding plateau by glaciers. After the glaciers melted, the land rebounded and the fjord was cut off from the sea. Salty water was eventually flushed from the fjord leaving it fresh. The catchment area is composed of igneous rock with relatively thin soil, so the waters feeding Western Brook Pond are low in nutrients and the lake is classified as ultraoligotrophic. It is fed by Stag Brook at the extreme eastern end of the lake and by numerous waterfalls cascading from the plateau above. One of these, Pissing Mare Falls at 350 m (1,150 ft), is one of the highest in eastern North America.

The lake is accessible by a moderate-easy 3 km (1.9 mi) hiking trail over coastal bogs and low limestone ridges. Two tour boats, one with a capacity of 70 passengers and the other 90 passengers, cruise the lake from June to mid-October. The lake waters are pristine, having had very little impact from human activities. The tour boat operators had to undergo special certification to ensure that their operations would have minimal impact on the environment.

In the early part of the 20th century, a part of the surrounding cliff broke off and fell into the lake, causing a 30 m (98 ft) tsunami.

== See also ==
- List of fjords in Canada
