= Glenburnie-Birchy Head-Shoal Brook =

Coordinates: 49.47183°N 57.91923°W

- Town
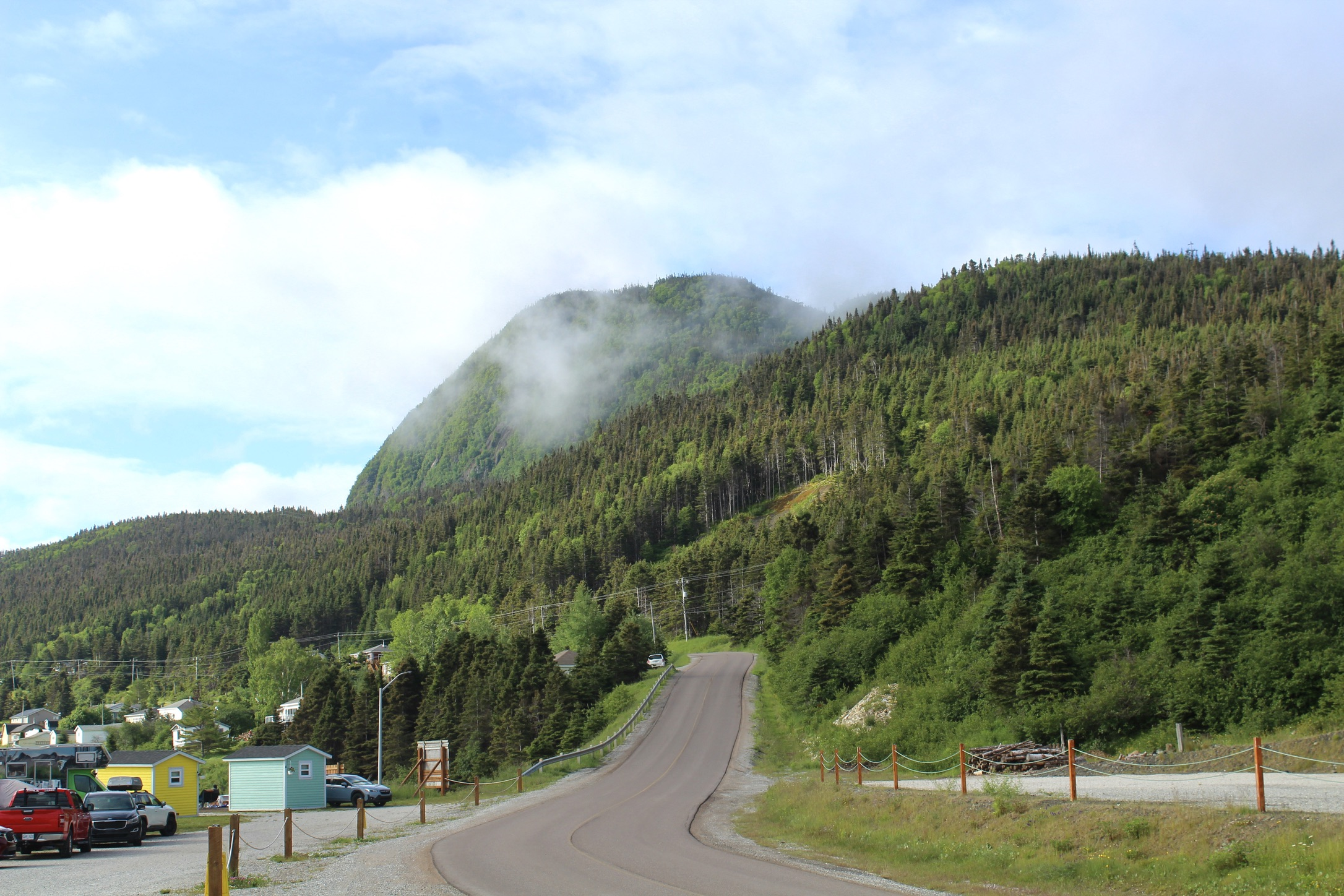
- Road out of Shoal Brook
- Interactive map of Glenburnie-Birchy Head-Shoal Brook
- Country: Canada
- Province: Newfoundland and Labrador

Population (2021)
  - Total: 241
- Time zone: UTC-3:30 (Newfoundland Time)
  - Summer (DST): UTC-2:30 (Newfoundland Daylight)
- Area code: 709
- Highways: Route 431

Glenburnie-Birchy Head-Shoal Brook is a town in the Canadian province of Newfoundland and Labrador. The town had a population of 241 in the Canada 2021 Census.

== Demographics ==
In the 2021 Census of Population conducted by Statistics Canada, Glenburnie-Birchy Head-Shoal Brook had a population of 241 living in 111 of its 182 total private dwellings, a change of 7.6% from its 2016 population of 224. With a land area of 6.52 km^{2} (2.52 sq mi), it had a population density of 37.0/km^{2} (95.7/sq mi) in 2021.

== See also ==
- List of cities and towns in Newfoundland and Labrador
