= Japan National Route 435 =

Road in Yamaguchi prefecture, Japan

National Route 435
- 国道435号
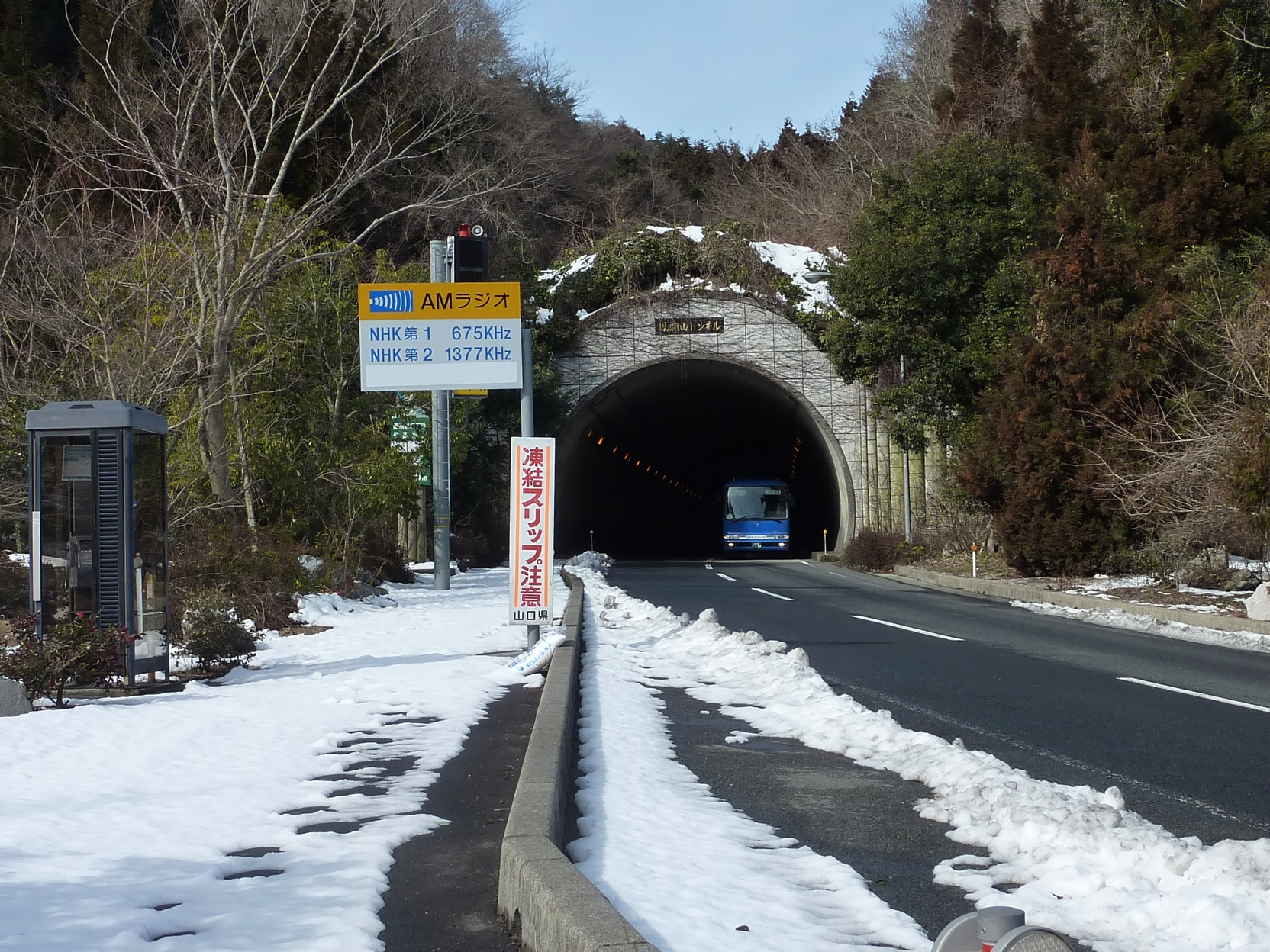

Route information
- Length: 73.8 km (45.9 mi)

Location
- Country: Japan

Highway system
- National highways of Japan; Expressways of Japan
← National Route 434	→ National Route 436

National Route 435 is a national highway of Japan connecting Yamaguchi, Yamaguchi and Shimonoseki, Yamaguchi in Japan, with a total length of 73.8 km (45.86 mi).
