= Japan National Route 436 =

Road in Japan

National Route 436
- 国道436号
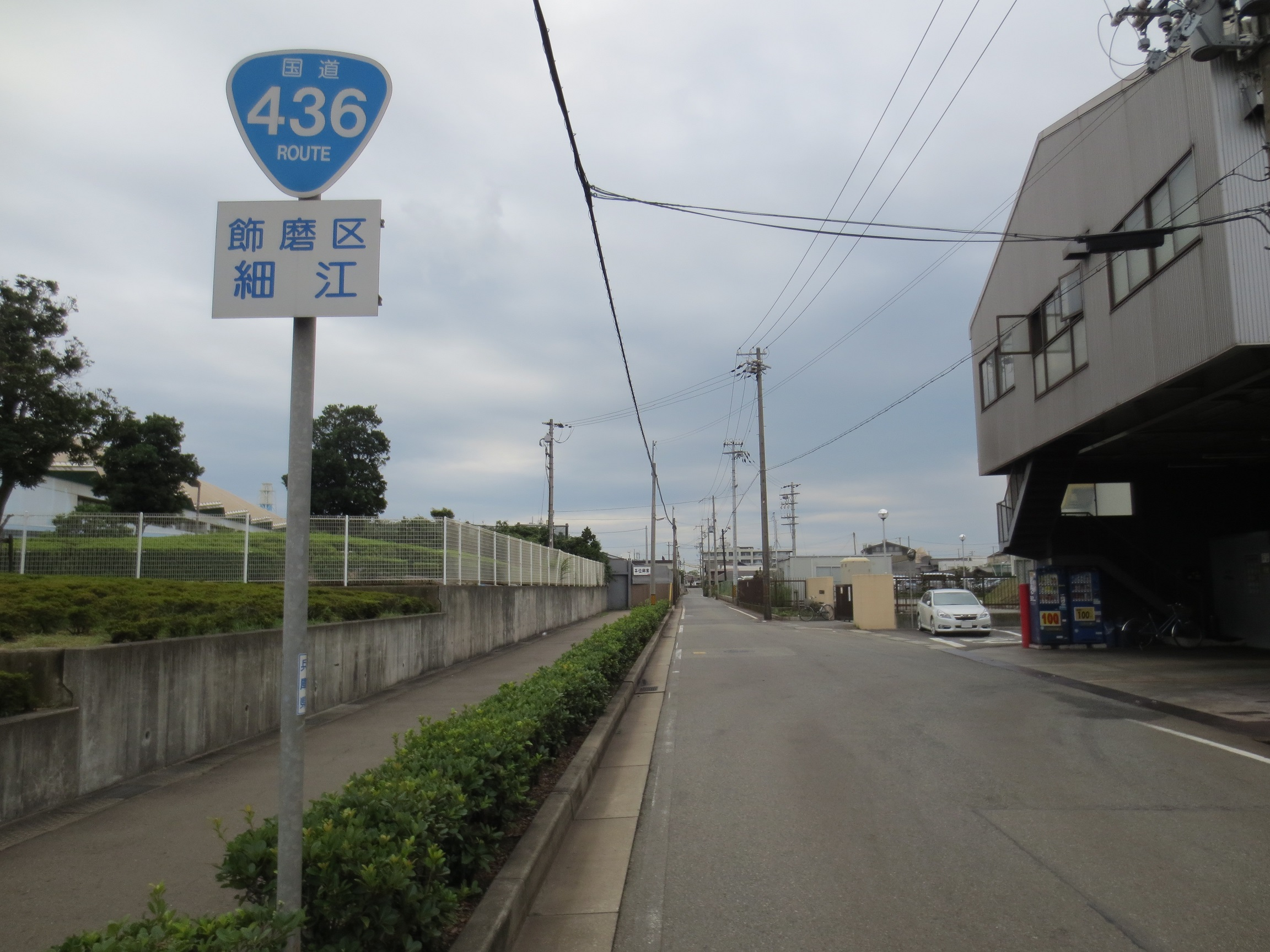

Route information
- Length: 33.4 km (20.8 mi)

Location
- Country: Japan

Highway system
- National highways of Japan; Expressways of Japan
← National Route 435	→ National Route 437

National Route 436 is a national highway of Japan connecting Himeji, Hyōgo and Takamatsu, Kagawa in Japan, with a total length of 35.4 km (20.75 mi).
