= List of highways numbered 430 =

The following highways are numbered 430:

== Canada ==
- Manitoba Provincial Road 430
- New Brunswick Route 430
- Newfoundland and Labrador Route 430
- Quebec Autoroute 430 (former)

== Japan ==
- Route 430 (Japan)

== United States ==
- Interstate 430
- U.S. Route 430 (former)
- Florida State Road 430
- Maryland Route 430
- Nevada State Route 430
- New York State Route 430
- Ohio State Route 430
- Pennsylvania Route 430
- Puerto Rico Highway 430
- South Carolina Highway 430
- Wyoming Highway 430

Preceded by 429	Lists of highways 430	Succeeded by 431
