= Bonne Bay =

Bay in Newfoundland, Canada

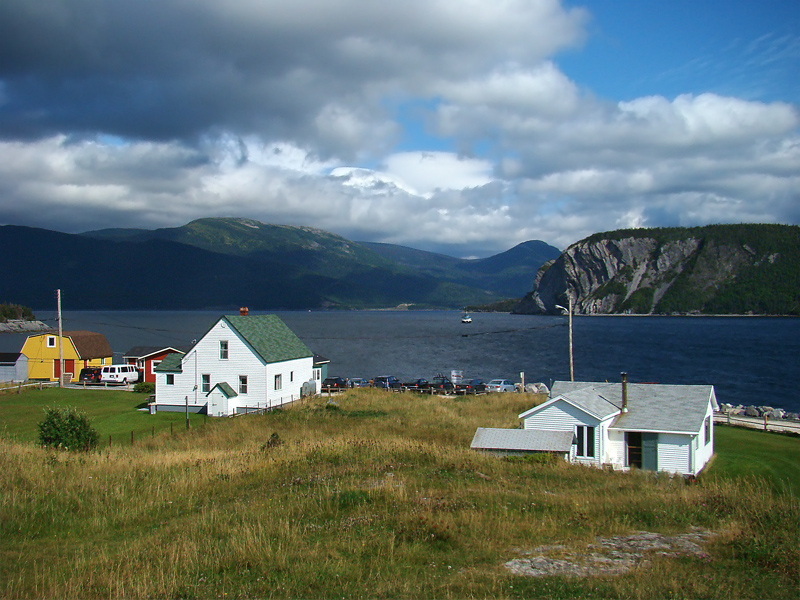
- Norris Point, at the junction of the South Arm and the East Arm of Bonne Bay

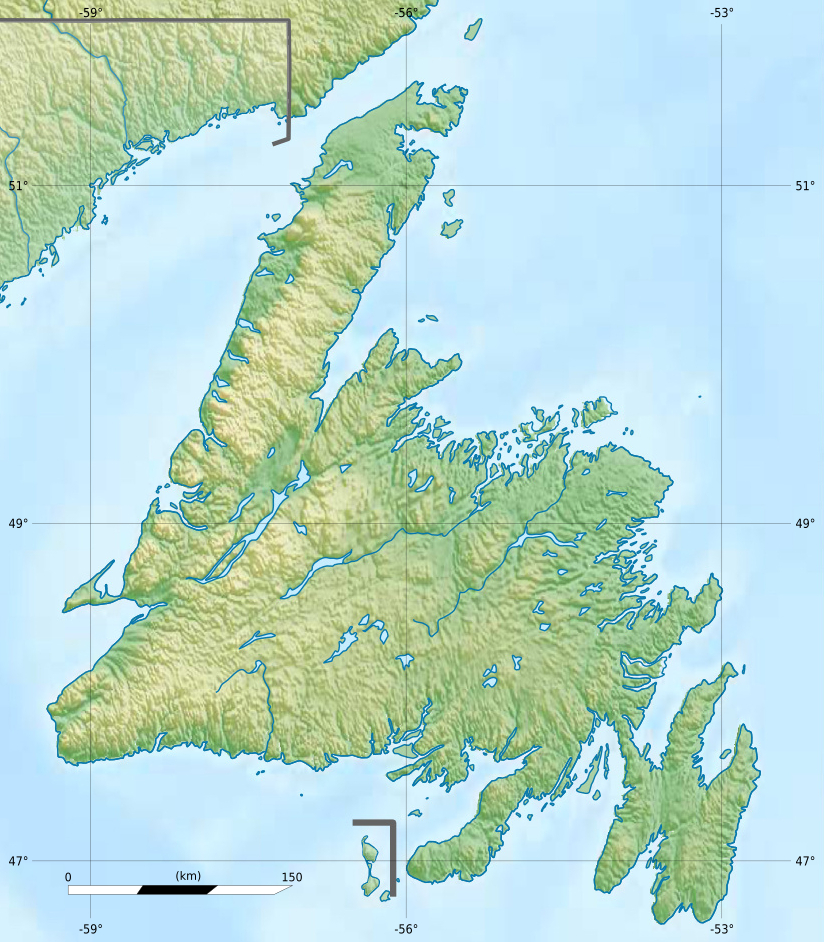
- Location within Newfoundland
- Location: Gros Morne National Park on the island of Newfoundland
- Coordinates: 49°33′12″N 57°55′53″W
- Type: Fiord
- Basin countries: Newfoundland and Labrador, Canada

Bonne Bay /ˈbɒn/ is a bay in Newfoundland, Canada. It is located on the western coast of Newfoundland and separates the Great Northern Peninsula from the rest of the island. It is a part of Gros Morne National Park.

It is separated into two sections: Inner Bonne Bay and Outer Bonne Bay. Inner Bonne Bay consists of two arms, one which is south which has wooded coves and beach landings. Outer Bonne Bay consists of the entrance to the fjord of Bonne Bay. Bonne Bay was carved out approximately 10,000 years ago by two large glaciers in each one of the arms. The glaciers then came together in the middle part of the Bay and continued to push on out to the ocean.

Mafic rock underlies the western shores of Bonne Bay, and clastic sedimentary rock is found on the eastern side. Soils on mafic rock belong to the Serpentine Cove Association, while sedimentary rock supports the Cox's Cove Association.

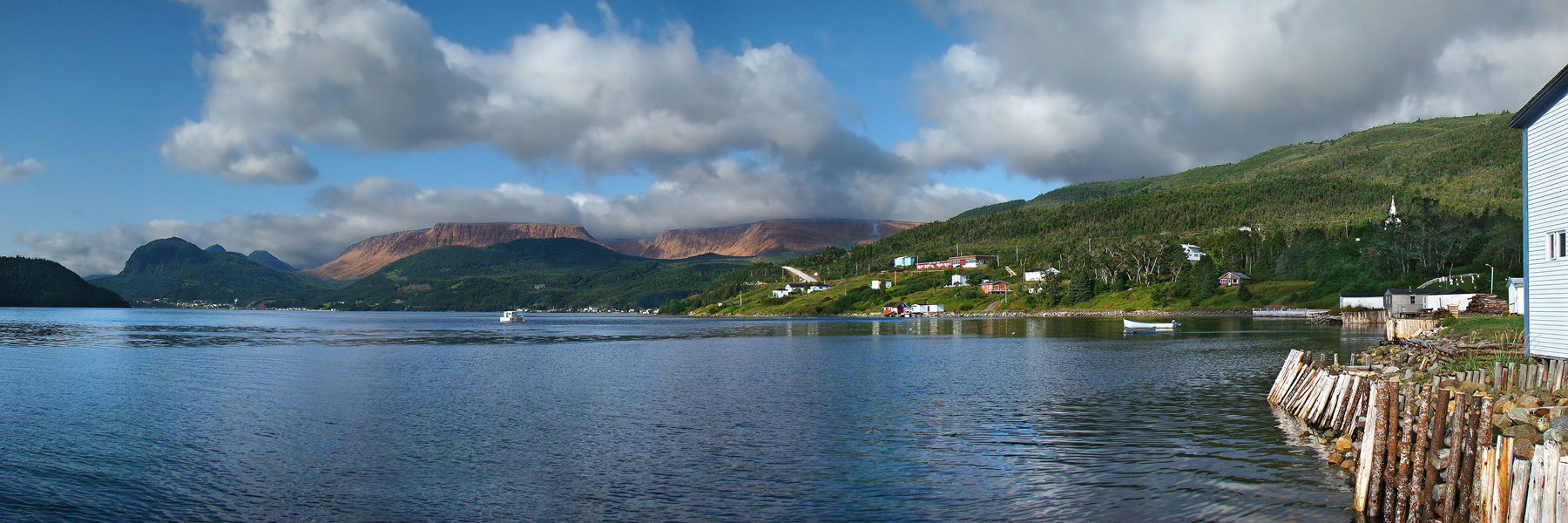
Bonne Bay in Woody Point, with the Gros Morne National Park in the background

== Recreation ==
Recreation in Bonne Bay consists of: Gros Morne National Park, Bonne Bay Marine station, kayak tours, Deer Lake insectarium, fishing and trouting, hiking, biking, boat tours, water taxis, and museums.
