= Gros Morne National Park =

National Park on the west coast of Newfoundland

- Parc national du Gros-Morne
- IUCN category II (national park)
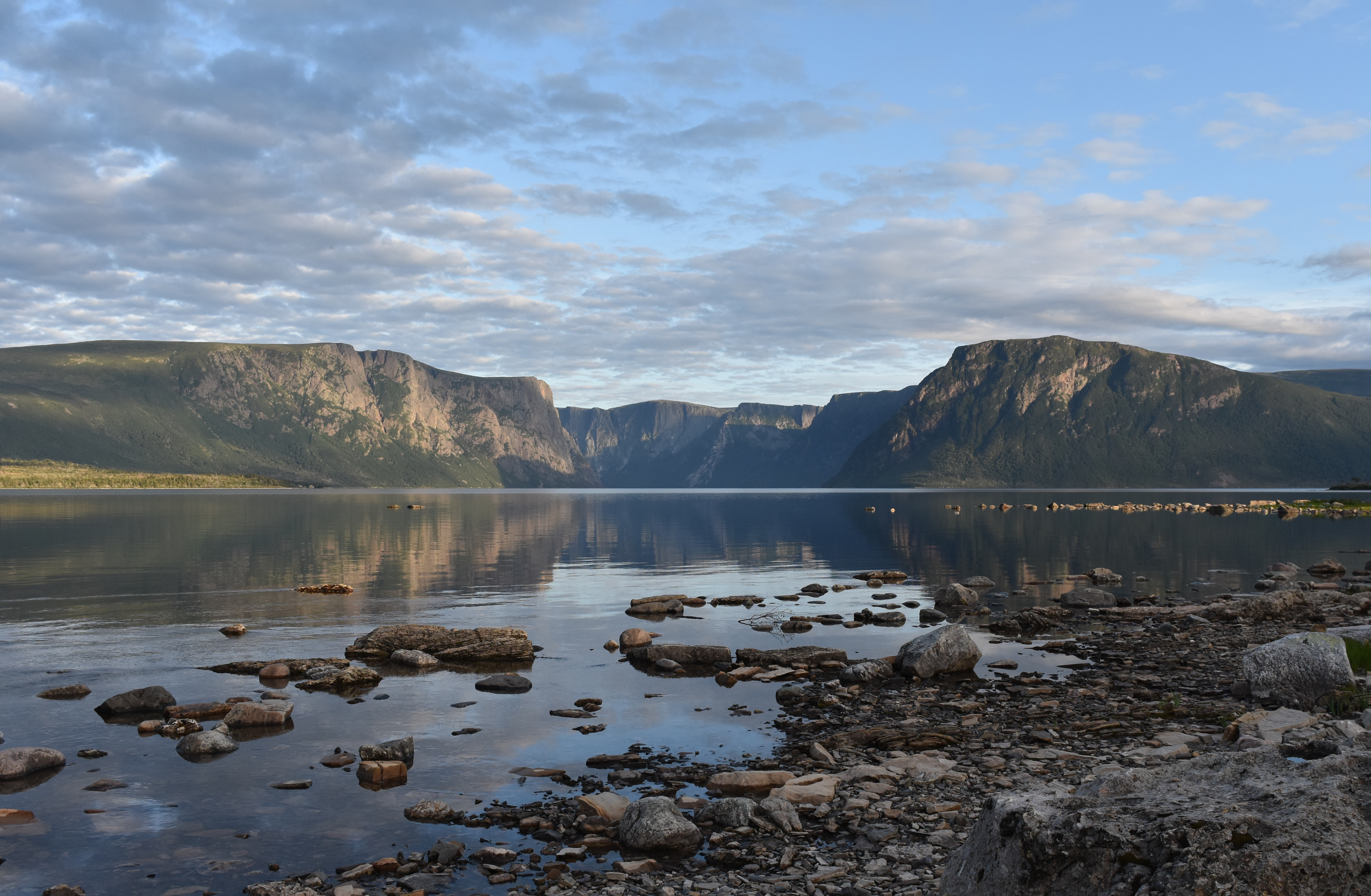
- Western Brook Pond in Gros Morne National Park

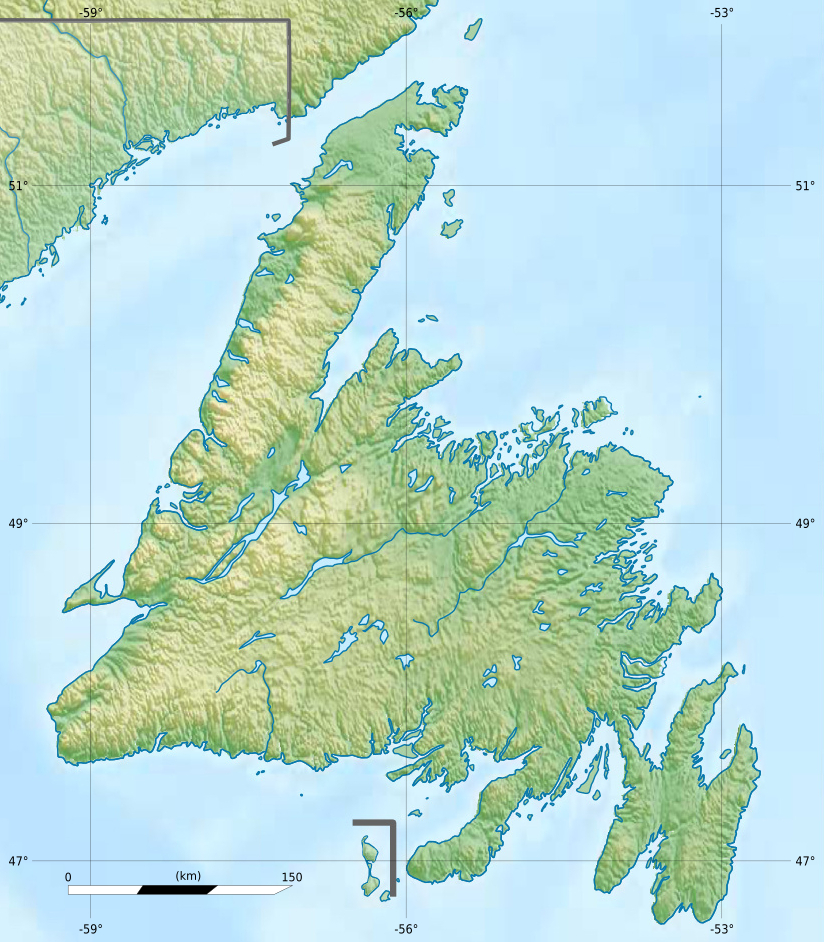
- Location within Canada Location within Newfoundland
- Interactive map of Gros Morne National Park
- Location: Rocky Harbour, Newfoundland and Labrador, Canada
- Coordinates: 49°41′22″N 57°44′17″W
- Area: 1,805 km^{2} (697 sq mi)
- Established: October 1, 2005 (national park); August 1973 (national park reserve)
- Governing body: Parks Canada

UNESCO World Heritage Site
- Criteria: Natural: vii, viii
- Reference: 419
- Inscription: 1987 (11th Session)

Gros Morne National Park is a Canadian national park and World Heritage Site located on the west coast of Newfoundland. At 1,805 km^{2} (697 sq mi), it is the second largest national park in Atlantic Canada after Torngat Mountains National Park, which has an area of 9,700 km^{2} (3,700 sq mi).

The park takes its name from Newfoundland's second-highest mountain peak (at 806 m or 2,644 ft) located within the park. Its French meaning is "large mountain standing alone", or more literally "great sombre". Gros Morne is a member of the Long Range Mountains, an outlying range of the Appalachian Mountains, stretching the length of the island's west coast. It is the eroded remnants of a mountain range formed 1.2 billion years ago. In 1987, the park was awarded World Heritage Site status by UNESCO because "The park provides a rare example of the process of continental drift, where deep ocean crust and the rocks of the earth's mantle lie exposed".

The Gros Morne National Park Reserve was established in 1973, and was made a national park on October 1, 2005.

The park was the subject of a short film in 2011's National Parks Project.

== Geology ==
The park's rock formations, made famous by Robert Stevens and Harold Williams, include oceanic crust and mantle rock exposed by the obduction process of plate tectonics, as well as sedimentary rock formed during the Ordovician, Precambrian granite and Palaeozoic igneous rocks. The Global Boundary Stratotype Section and Point (GSSP) of the Tremadocian stage and the all Ordovician system is defined in the Green Point section within this park.

The park is located in the Great Northern Peninsula of Western Newfoundland. This peninsula is referred to as the Humber Zone, a Miogeocline, the Highlands of which contain the largest external basement massif of the Grenville Orogeny in the Appalachian Orogen. This Precambrian basement is known as the Long Range Inlier, Long Range Complex or Basement Gneiss Complex, consisting of quartz–feldspar gneisses and granites that are up to 1550 Ma in age. Mt. Gros Morne and Mt. Big Level lie within this Inlier. The western boundary of this inlier (along Western Brook Pond, St. Pauls Inlet, and south of Portl Creek Pond) consists of Devonian and Ordovician thrust faults, where crystalline rocks thrust over Cambrian–Ordovician carbonate rocks and the Lower Paleozoic Humber Arm Allochthon. The Rocky Harbour mélange is a Lower–Middle Ordovician collection of greywacke, quartzite, dolomite shale, chert, limestone blocks within a black, green, and red scaly shale matrix, which occurs along the shore from West Brook Pond to Humber Arm (Bay of Islands). The south portion of the park, Table Mtn. (Tablelands) and North Arm Mtn., consists of Upper Cambrian and Lower Ordovician ophiolites known as the Bay of Islands Complex, Little Post Complex, and Old Man Cove Formation. Finally, a Pleistocene ice cap flowed radially across the island, developing fjords such as Bonne Bay.

=== Tablelands ===
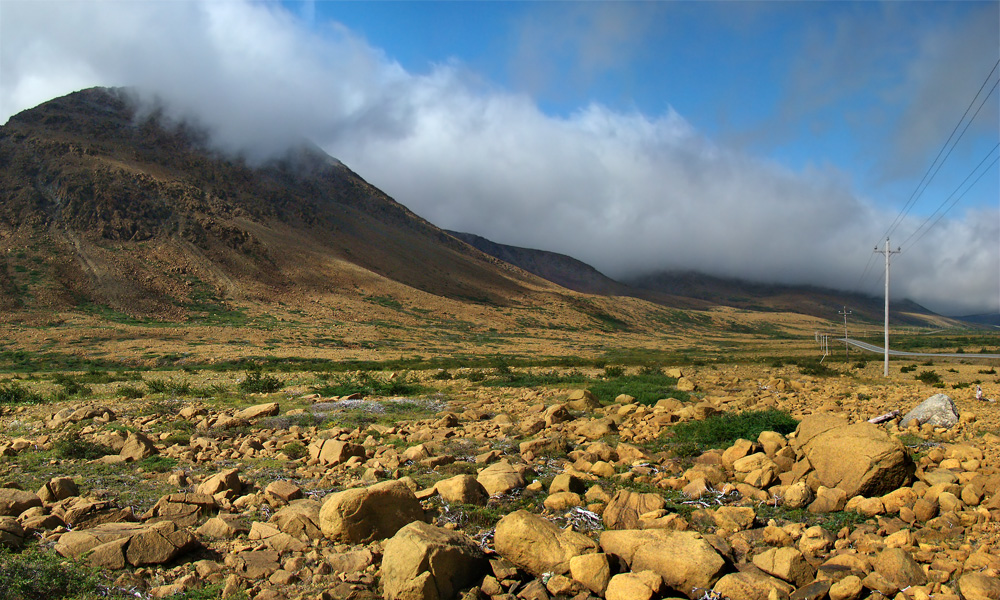
The Tablelands in Gros Morne National Park, looking west. Note the sparse vegetation and pale rusty colour of the weathered ultramafic rock. Beyond the right edge of this image, to the north, mafic uplands support stunted but locally dense coniferous forest.

The Tablelands, found between the towns of Trout River and Woody Point in south west of Gros Morne National Park, look more like a barren desert than traditional Newfoundland. This is due to the ultramafic rocks –varieties of peridotite and serpentinite – which make up the Tablelands. They are thought to originate in the Earth's mantle and were forced up from the depths during a plate collision several hundred million years ago. Ultramafic rocks lack some of the usual nutrients required to sustain most plant life and have a toxic quality, hence their barren appearance. Ultramafic rocks are also high in iron, which accounts for its brownish colour (rusted colour). Underneath the weathered surface zone, the unweathered rock is a dark green colour.

== Soils ==
The park’s soils vary widely because they formed on many different types of bedrock. In the northeast, the Silver Mountain soil association is the most common. These soils are very stony sandy loams that developed on glacial till lying over granite, granitic gneiss, and schist. Similar rock types underlie the St. Paul’s Inlet association farther west.

In the southeast, sedimentary rocks, including areas of dolomitic limestone, support the North Lake association, which is also made up of stony sandy loam. Near the coast, a narrow and uneven band of mostly shallow loam known as the Cox’s Cove association lies over shale, slate, limestone, and sandstone.

North of Bonne Bay, the coastal strip is dominated by peat-rich soils of the Gull’s Marsh association and the coarser soils of the Sally’s Cove association. One exception is the area around Rocky Harbour, where clay-based soils of the Wood’s Island association occur.

South of Bonne Bay, the park’s ultramafic tablelands have stony, nutrient-poor soils belonging to the Serpentine Range association. Related soils also occur on nearby mafic uplands, where they are somewhat more fertile and able to support forest growth.

== Western Brook Pond – Fjord ==
Western Brook Pond is a fresh water fjord which was carved out by glaciers during the most recent ice age from 25,000 to about 10,000 years ago. Once the glaciers melted, the land, which had been pushed down by the weight of the ice sheet, rebounded and the outlet to the sea was cut off. The 16-kilometre (9.9 mi) long narrow "pond" then filled in with fresh water. The water in the fjord is extremely pure and is assigned the highest purity rating available for natural bodies of water. Pissing Mare Falls, the highest waterfall in eastern North America and 199th highest in the world, flows into Western Brook Pond. Sedimentary rocks, some of them calcareous, underlie the westernmost shores. Elsewhere, granitic gneiss is dominant.

== Nature and wildlife ==
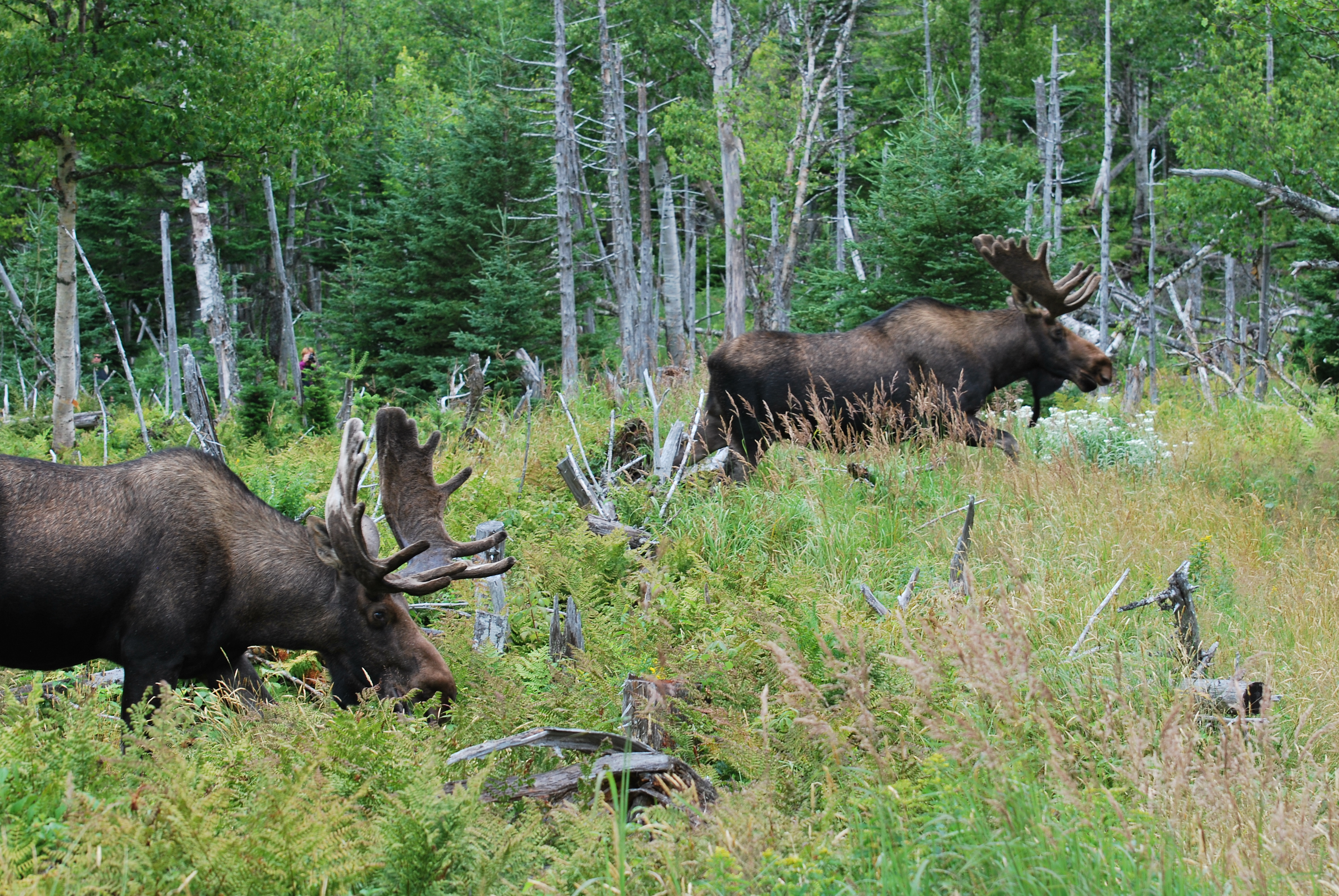
Moose in the park

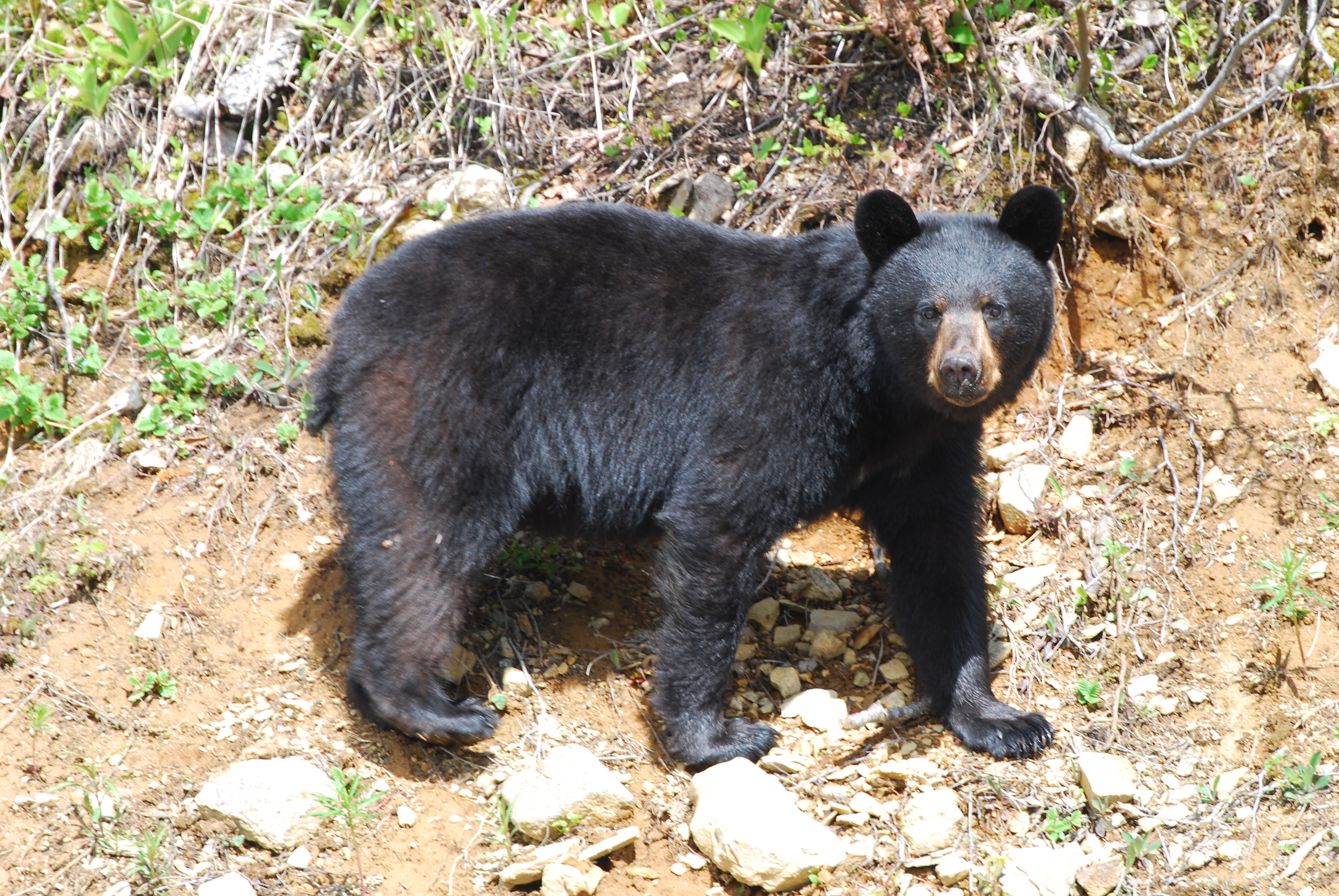
Newfoundland black bear in Gros Morne National Park.

Gros Morne supports a wide range of terrestrial and marine wildlife across its coastal, forest, bog, and alpine habitats.

=== Large mammals ===
Eastern moose are especially prominent in the park and form part of a population introduced to Newfoundland from the Maritimes around 1900. Studies by Parks Canada have found moose densities in Gros Morne to be five to 20 times higher than those in comparable areas elsewhere in Canada. Other large mammals include Newfoundland’s endemic caribou ecotype (Rangifer tarandus terranovae), Newfoundland black bears (Ursus americanus hamiltoni), and Canada lynx (Lynx canadensis).

=== Small and mid-sized mammals ===
Common smaller mammals include Arctic foxes, red foxes, beavers, American red squirrels, river otters, and snowshoe hares.

=== Marine mammals ===
Harbour seals are commonly seen in St. Pauls Inlet. Several cetacean species may also be present offshore, particularly during the early-summer capelin run. These include Atlantic white-sided dolphins, fin whales, harbour porpoises, humpback whales, killer whales, minke whales, and pilot whales.

=== Birds ===
The park supports many bird species, from shorebirds along the coast to species inhabiting bogs and interior forests. Alpine areas host rock ptarmigan and willow ptarmigan.

== World Heritage Site ==
In 1987, the park was designated a UNESCO World Heritage Site for both its geological history and its exceptional scenery. The geology of the park in particular illustrates the concept of plate tectonics, and has shed important light on geological evolution and its processes.

In respect of its key role in the development of an understanding of plate tectonics, the Mohorovičić discontinuity at Gros Morne was included by the International Union of Geological Sciences (IUGS) in its assemblage of 100 'geological heritage sites' around the world in a listing published in October 2022.

== Trails ==
Hiking the trails is a popular activity at Gros Morne. There are about 20 marked day trip trails, exploring coastal and interior areas of the park. One of the more strenuous dayhikes is the 16 km hike over Gros Morne Mountain. This trail is also called the James Callaghan Trail after the former British Prime Minister, who visited in 1976, in recognition of his conservation efforts. A small controversy arose after Callaghan did not visit the trail that had been named in his honour.

The interior of the park can also be accessed, notably through the multi-day Long Range Traverse between Western Brook Pond and Gros Morne Mountain.

== Arts and culture ==
The park is home to many arts festivals, including Gros Morne Theatre Festival, Writers at Woody Point, Gros Morne Summer Music, and Trails, Tales and Tunes.

== See also ==
- National Parks of Canada
- List of National Parks of Canada
- Bonne Bay Marine Station
- Green Point
