= Newfoundland and Labrador Route 438 =

Canadian highway

Route 438
- Croque Road

Route information
- Maintained by Newfoundland and Labrador Department of Transportation and Infrastructure
- Length: 28.8 km (17.9 mi)

Major junctions
- West end: Route 432 near Main Brook
- East end: St. Julien's

Location
- Country: Canada
- Province: Newfoundland and Labrador

Highway system
- Highways in Newfoundland and Labrador
← Route 437	→ Route 440

Route 438, also known as Croque Road, is a 28.8-kilometre-long (17.9 mi) east–west highway on the Great Northern Peninsula of Newfoundland in the Canadian Province of Newfoundland and Labrador. It connects the communities of Croque and St. Julien's (also known as Grandois) with Route 432 (Main Brook Highway) and the town of Main Brook. The entire length of Route 438 is a narrow, winding, gravel road.

== Route description ==
Route 438 begins just south of Main Brook at an intersection with Route 432 and immediately winds its way east through hilly terrain for nearly 20 kilometres (12 mi). It now enters the community of Croque, where it makes a left onto a straighter path northward at the western end of the community. The highway passes through more hilly terrain before arriving at the coastline and St. Julien's (also known as Grandois), where Route 438 comes to a dead end at the northern edge of town.

== Major intersections ==
Location	km	mi	Destinations	Notes
Main Brook	0.0	0.0	Route 432 (Main Brook Highway/Grenfell Loop) to Route 430 – Plum Point, Roddickton, Main Brook, St. Anthony	Western terminus; access to Route 1 (TCH) via Route 430
Croque	19.9	12.4	Main Road - Downtown	
St. Julien's	28.8	17.9	Dead End	Eastern terminus
1.000 mi = 1.609 km; 1.000 km = 0.621 mi
