= Newfoundland and Labrador Route 433 =

Highway in Newfoundland and Labrador, Canada

Route 433
- Englee Highway

Route information
- Maintained by Newfoundland and Labrador Department of Transportation and Infrastructure
- Length: 35.7 km (22.2 mi)

Major junctions
- South end: Englee
- Route 434 in Roddickton
- North end: Route 432 north of Roddickton

Location
- Country: Canada
- Province: Newfoundland and Labrador

Highway system
- Highways in Newfoundland and Labrador
← Route 432	→ Route 434

Route 433, also known as Englee Highway, is a 35.7-kilometre-long (22.2 mi) north–south highway on the Great Northern Peninsula of Newfoundland in the Canadian province of Newfoundland and Labrador. It connects the towns of Englee and Roddickton-Bide Arm, as well as Conche via Route 434 (Conche Road), with Route 432 (Main Brook Highway) and Main Brook.

== Route description ==
Route 433 begins in downtown Englee and winds its way northward through neighbourhoods to leave town and travel along the cliffs overlooking the coastline for several kilometres. It now enters the combined municipality of Roddickton-Bide Arm and passes through Bide Arm before leaving the coastline and passing through wooded areas. The highway now winds its way through Roddickton, where it has an intersection with Route 434, before leaving town and Roddickton-Bide Arm to pass through rural areas for several kilometres before coming to an end at an intersection with Route 432.

== Major intersections ==
Location	km	mi	Destinations	Notes
Englee	0.0	0.0	Fillers Road / Dorset Drive	Southern terminus
Bide Arm	9.8	6.1	Bide Arm Road (Route 433-10) - Downtown	
Roddickton	20.5	12.7	Route 434 east (Conche Road) – Conche	Western terminus of Route 434
	35.7	22.2	Route 432 (Main Brook Highway/Grenfell Loop) to Route 430 – Plum Point, Main Brook, St. Anthony	Northern terminus; provides access to Route 1 (TCH) via Route 430
1.000 mi = 1.609 km; 1.000 km = 0.621 mi
