= Newfoundland and Labrador Route 432 =

Highway in Newfoundland and Labrador, Canada

Route 432
- Main Brook Highway; The Grenfell Loop

Route information
- Maintained by Newfoundland and Labrador Department of Transportation and Infrastructure
- Length: 110 km (68 mi)

Major junctions
- West end: Route 430 in Plum Point
- Route 433 near Roddickton; Route 438 near Main Brook
- East end: Route 430 at St. Anthony Airport

Location
- Country: Canada
- Province: Newfoundland and Labrador

Highway system
- Highways in Newfoundland and Labrador
← Route 431	→ Route 433

Route 432, also known as Main Brook Highway, is a 110-kilometre-long (68 mi) east-west highway on the Great Northern Peninsula of Newfoundland in the Canadian Province of Newfoundland and Labrador. It connects the towns of Roddickton, Bide Arm, Main Brook, along with many other smaller communities, with Route 430 (Great Northern Peninsula Highway/Viking Trail) and the town of St. Anthony. Route 432 also carries the designation The Grenfell Loop after the Grenfell Mission founded by Sir Wilfred Grenfell.

== Route description ==
Route 432 begins at an intersection with Route 430 in Plum Point and winds its way east through wooded, hilly, and rural terrain for several kilometres. The highway has an intersection with Route 433 (Englee Highway) just north of Roddickton before winding its way northeast to have an intersection with Route 438 (Croque Road) and passing through Main Brook. Route 432 continues northward through rural areas for several kilometres before coming to an end at another intersection with Route 430 at the St. Anthony Airport.

== Major intersections ==
Location	km	mi	Destinations	Notes
Plum Point	0.0	0.0	Route 430 (Great Northern Peninsula Highway/Viking Trail) to Route 1 (TCH) – Deer Lake, Rocky Harbour, St. Barbe, St. Anthony	Western terminus; provides access to Gros Morne National Park and Labrador Ferry
	53.6	33.3	Route 433 south (Englee Highway) – Roddickton, Bide Arm, Englee, Conche	Northern terminus of Route 433
Main Brook	76.1	47.3	Route 438 east (Croque Road) – Croque, St. Julien's	Western terminus of Route 438
	110	68	Route 430 (Great Northern Peninsula Highway/Viking Trail) to Route 1 (TCH) – Deer Lake, Rocky Harbour, St. Barbe, St. Anthony St. Anthony Airport	Eastern terminus; road continues north as an access road to the airport
1.000 mi = 1.609 km; 1.000 km = 0.621 mi
