= Newfoundland and Labrador Route 434 =

Highway in Newfoundland and Labrador, Canada

Route 434
- Conche Road

Route information
- Maintained by Newfoundland and Labrador Department of Transportation and Infrastructure
- Length: 23.6 km (14.7 mi)

Major junctions
- West end: Route 433 in Roddickton
- East end: Conche

Location
- Country: Canada
- Province: Newfoundland and Labrador

Highway system
- Highways in Newfoundland and Labrador
← Route 433	→ Route 435

Route 434, also known as Conche Road, is a 23.6-kilometre-long (14.7 mi) east–west highway on the Great Northern Peninsula of Newfoundland in the Canadian province of Newfoundland and Labrador. It serves as the only road access to the town of Conche, connecting it with the town of Roddickton and Route 433 (Englee Highway).

Route 434 is a paved, winding, two-lane road through rural hilly terrain for its entire length. There are no other communities or intersections of any kind along Route 434 other than at its two termini.

In 2016, Route 434 was voted the second Worst Road in Atlantic Canada by the Canadian Automobile Association's Worst Roads list. This was the third time in six years that Route 434 had made the list.

== Major intersections ==
Location	km	mi	Destinations	Notes
Roddickton	0.0	0.0	Route 433 (Englee Highway) – Englee, Bide Arm, Main Brook	Western terminus
Conche	23.6	14.7	Dead End at Conche's harbour	Eastern terminus
1.000 mi = 1.609 km; 1.000 km = 0.621 mi
