= 40th (the 2nd Somersetshire) Regiment of Foot =

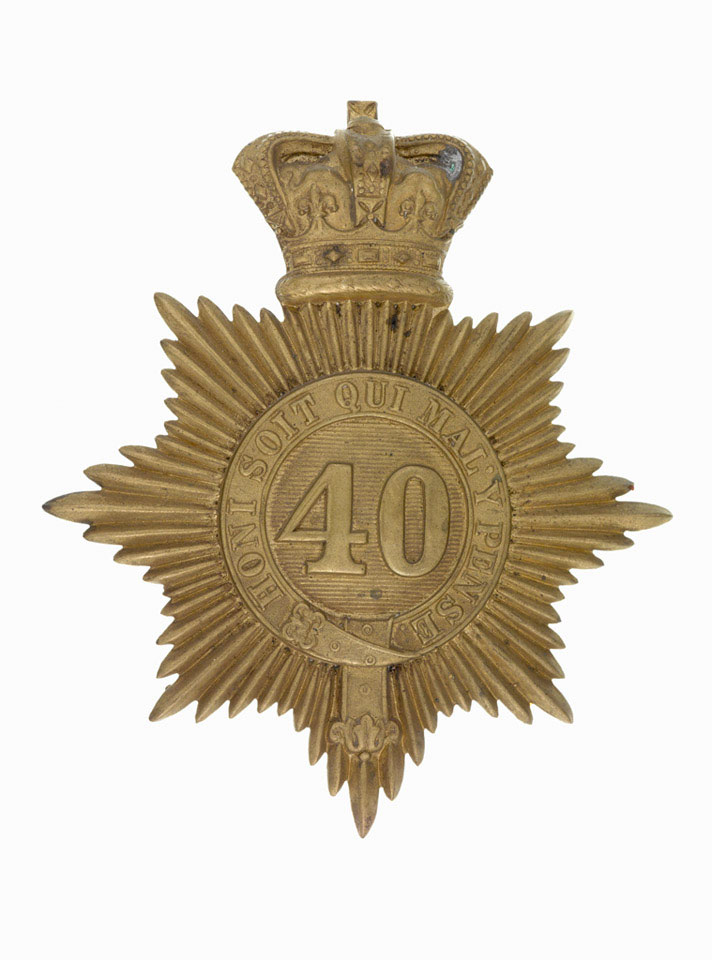
- 1855–1861 regimental shako plate for other ranks
- Active: 1717–1881
- Country: Great Britain (1717–1800); United Kingdom (1801–1881)
- Branch: British Army
- Type: Line infantry
- Size: 1 battalion (1717–1799; 1802–1804; 1816–1881); 2 battalions (1799-1802; 1804-1816)
- Garrison/HQ: Peninsula Barracks, Warrington
- Nicknames: "The Excellers", "The Fighting Fortieth"
- Colors: Light Buff Facings, Gold Braided Lace
- Engagements: Father Rale's War; King George's War; Father Le Loutre's War; French and Indian War; American Revolutionary War; Napoleonic Wars; War of 1812; Black War; First Anglo-Afghan War; Gwalior campaign New Zealand Wars

The 40th (the 2nd Somersetshire) Regiment of Foot was an infantry regiment of the British Army, raised in 1717 in Annapolis Royal, Nova Scotia. Under the Childers Reforms it amalgamated with the 82nd Regiment of Foot (Prince of Wales's Volunteers) to form the Prince of Wales's Volunteers (South Lancashire Regiment) in 1881.

== History ==
=== Formation ===
The regiment was raised at Annapolis Royal in Nova Scotia by General Richard Philipps as the Richard Philipps's Regiment of Foot in August 1717 out of independent companies stationed in North America and the West Indies.

=== Father Rale's War ===
Prior to Father Rale's War, the Mi'kmaq responded to the establishment of a British fort at Canso, Nova Scotia by raiding the settlement's fishing station in 1720. Phillips sent a company of the 40th, under the command of Major Lawrence Armstrong, to take up garrison of a small fort in Canso built by a group of New England fishermen. The Mi'kmaq continued preying on nearby shipping, forcing the garrison to take action in February 1723. Serving as marines, the troops and local fishermen were able to disperse the attacking indigenous people. The next engagement came in July 1724 when a party of sixty Mi'kmaq attacked Annapolis Royal. The garrison responded with a poorly calculated sortie from the town's dilapidated fort, resulting in the death of a sergeant and private, the wounding of an officer and three privates, and the repulse of the troops. After some pillaging, the Mi'kmaq departed with a number of civilian prisoners.

From 1717 to 1743, Phillips' Regiment, garrisoning Annapolis, Placentia, and Canso, was successful in protecting settlers from Indian attacks, checking French influence in the area, and preserving the British foothold in Atlantic Canada.

=== King George's War ===
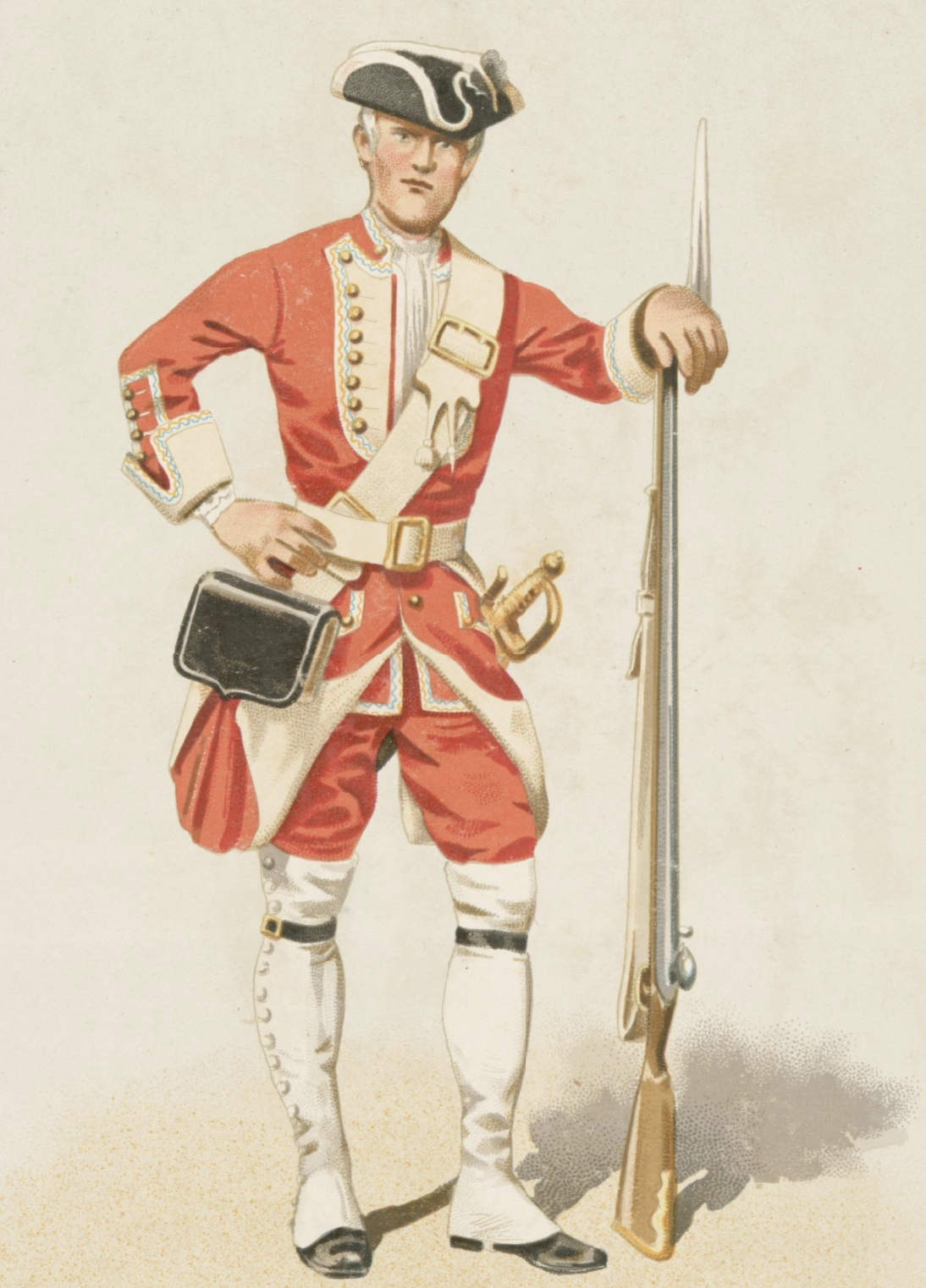
A regimental private in 1742

At the outbreak of King George's War, the French at Louisbourg immediately engaged in the Raid on Canso in May 1744. A flotilla containing 900 French regulars and militia. The four poorly supplied companies of Phillips' Regiment were forced to surrender. The town was destroyed and the prisoners sent to Louisbourg. Once the regiment's officers and men were paroled in September 1744, the regiment was evacuated to Boston where they provided valuable information on the defences of Louisbourg for the British siege the following year. Governor Shirley was having difficulty raising troops requested by Mascarene and therefore he ordered the ex-Canso garrison to Annapolis Royal.

The Newfoundland Campaign started during August 1744. Captain Robert Young, of the 44-gun ship Kinsale, lying in St. John's, Newfoundland, received intelligence that five French ships were in the port of Fishotte and resolved on despatching an armed prize to attack them. The prize was named the St. Philip, and was manned by eighty men of the Kinsale's crew, and commanded by one of her lieutenants, and accompanied by three 10-gun colonial privateers. The St. Philip succeeded, after grounding several times, in reaching the Moderate, of twelve guns and seventy-five men, which was boarded and carried; then turning the Moderate's guns against the remaining ships, without the assistance of the privateers (who did not get into the harbour in time), compelled the whole to surrender. The St. Philip had ten killed, and thirty wounded. The loss on board the French ships was more severe. The five vessels, which had on board 18,000 quintals of fish and eighty tons of oil, mounted together sixty-six guns, and carried 342 men.

In July 1744, three hundred Indians under command of a French priest named Le Loutre attacked Annapolis, the only British garrison in Nova Scotia. Only eighty men of Phillips' Regiment were available to meet this threat, commanded by Lieutenant Colonel Paul Mascarene. Mascarene refused to surrender to Le Loutre. Le Loutre's party eventually burned a number of houses and withdrew. Following this, George II authorized the reorganization of the regiment which increased to six regiments the garrison at Annapolis, with an authorized complement of 450. Initially only seventy additional men were received. Recruitment efforts continued and Governor Shirley sent 206 recruits in February 1746. Despite the additional manpower the regiment remained under strength. It was at this time that Captain John Winslow first took command of a Philipp's regiment at Annapolis Royal, after being transferred from Newfoundland. In September the enemy, this time three hundred regulars and militia with Indian support, reappeared outside the dilapidated earthworks of Annapolis Royal. After a four-week siege and lacking a train of artillery, the French withdrew from the defiant garrison.

A force of six hundred French and Indians again attempted to take Annapolis in May 1745. This demonstration ended quickly with the French and Mi'kmaq being ordered back to help defend Louisbourg from the British. The only other action seen by Phillips' Regiment occurred while serving as marines and seamen. A detachment from the garrison at St. John's, Newfoundland volunteered to serve on a captured twenty-gun ship for an expedition with three privateers to Fishotte Bay. The prize entered Fishotte Bay alone and engaged a number of anchored French ships. After five hours of fighting and the loss of ten killed and thirty wounded, the ship had captured three fourteen-gun and two twelve-gun enemy ships; forty six of their crews were killed and three hundred and thirty two made prisoner. The lagging privateers entered the harbour and assisted in the destruction of French fishing stages and the removal of enemy ships and prisoners.

By the end of the war Phillips' Regiment, after defending Britain's foothold in Nova Scotia with a skeleton complement, had its establishment raised to seventy men for each company. Men were quickly impressed in England for service in the regiment. Between 1746 and 1748 the regiment contented itself with garrison duty at Annapolis and St. John's. With a continuing problem of finding recruits in Britain for the Philipp's regiment George II took the unusual step of allowing recruitment from the colonies for the British regiment.

=== Father Le Loutre's War ===
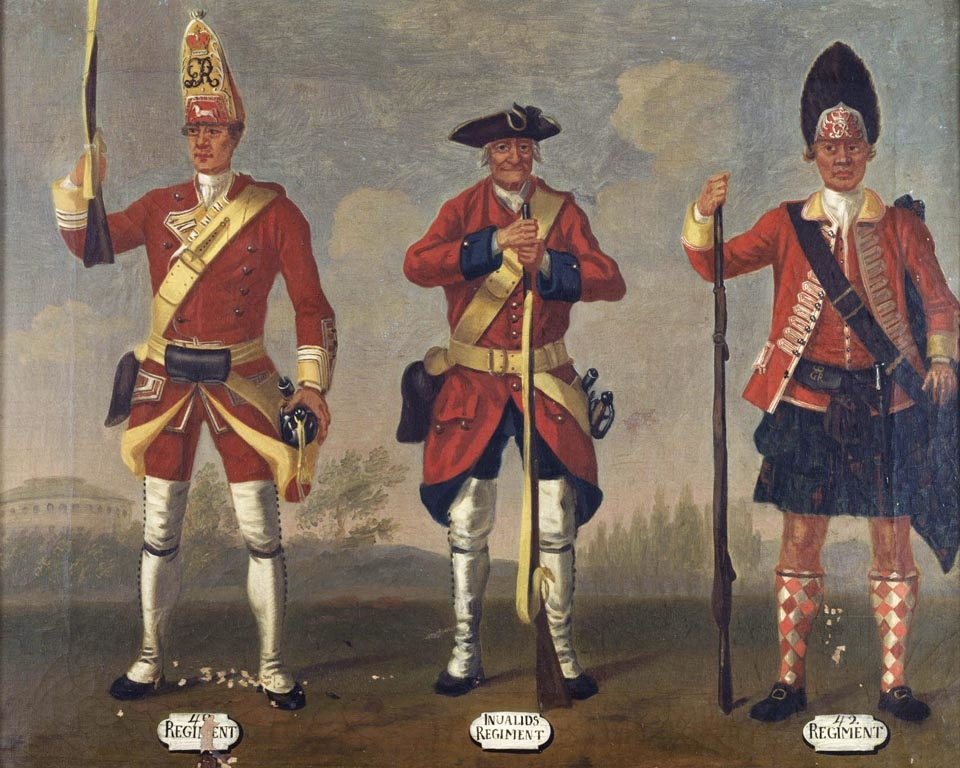
c. 1751 painting of a regimental grenadier (left)

The 40th was also actively engaged in Father Le Loutre's War. In July 1749, the grenadier company under Captain Handfield were sent to garrison the new settlement of Halifax founded the month earlier by the new Governor of Nova Scotia, Edward Cornwallis. A surprise attack by local Mi'kmaq in the Siege of Grand Pré resulted in the capture of a detachment of the company including Lieutenant Hamilton and Handfield's son. The captives were later returned to Halifax. Further engagements occurred with the Indians that year as the troops preserved the line of communication between Halifax and Annapolis Royal. Additional members of the regiment formed the garrison of Fort Sackville and established themselves at Fort Edward.

By 1750 Cornwallis had taken over the colonelcy of the regiment. By the Royal Warrant of 1 July 1751, Cornwallis' Regiment was given the numerical distinction of the 40th Regiment of Foot. Neglected for so many years by its former colonel, Cornwallis set about enhancing the condition of his new regiment. The companies in Newfoundland were rotated and discipline was improved. Desertion was poorly tolerated by Cornwallis. Of six deserters stationed at Fort Vieux Logis, two were shot and the rest reprieved. Three other deserters were hanged and their bodies suspended in chains as a warning to others. Further changes happened in the 40th with Cornwallis' appointment of Major Charles Lawrence of the 45th to the regiment's lieutenant colonelcy. Lawrence proved to be an energetic and effective military and administrative leader. After his appointment, Lawrence lead an expedition to the Missaguash River in August 1750 where he routed in the Battle at Chignecto a superior number of Indians under Le Loutre. That fall he built Fort Lawrence across the river where the following spring the French would build Fort Beausejour.

In 1752 Peregrine Hopson succeeded Cornwallis as Nova Scotia's governor and colonel of the 40th Regiment. In poor health, Hopson returned to England in 1753 leaving the governing of the colony to Lawrence. In 1755 Hopson officially resigned as governor and Lawrence was appointed. However Hopson remained the colonel of the 40th Regiment until his death in 1759. (Afterward, for the first time since its formation, the regiment's colonel was not the governor of Nova Scotia. Hopson was succeeded as colonel in 1759 by John Barrington, followed by Robert Armiger in December 1760.)

=== French and Indian War ===
By 1755 it was decided that the recently erected French Fort Beausejour had to be removed as a threat. The English force, including members of the 40th Regiment, was met by a large body of regulars and militia as they crossed the Missaquash river. This enemy force was attacked and dispersed quickly. Beausejour was subsequently laid siege to on 21 June and it surrendered four days later.

Also in 1755, under the command of John Handfield, the 40th were engaged in the Expulsion of the Acadians from Annapolis Royal. After such a long stay in the colony, a number of the officers had married into the local Acadian population. Therefore, the deportation order forced officers to exile their own relations. Even the commander of the garrison, Major Handfield, had to deport his wife's "sister-in-law, nephews and nieces, uncles, aunts, and cousins." Handfield wrote to another officer performing the same task: "I heartily join with you in wishing that we were both of us got over this most disagreeable and troublesome part of the Service."

In 1757, after forty years in Annapolis Royal, the town where the regiment had been raised, 43rd relieved the 40th where it then went to Halifax to prepare for service in the Seven Years' War. In 1758, under the command of Lieutenant-Colonel John Handfield, the regiment participated in the second siege of Louisbourg. Some companies of the regiment participated in the Louisbourg Grenadiers on its formation in 1759. The following year, the regiment took part in the successful three pronged attack against Montréal in September which concluded the war there.

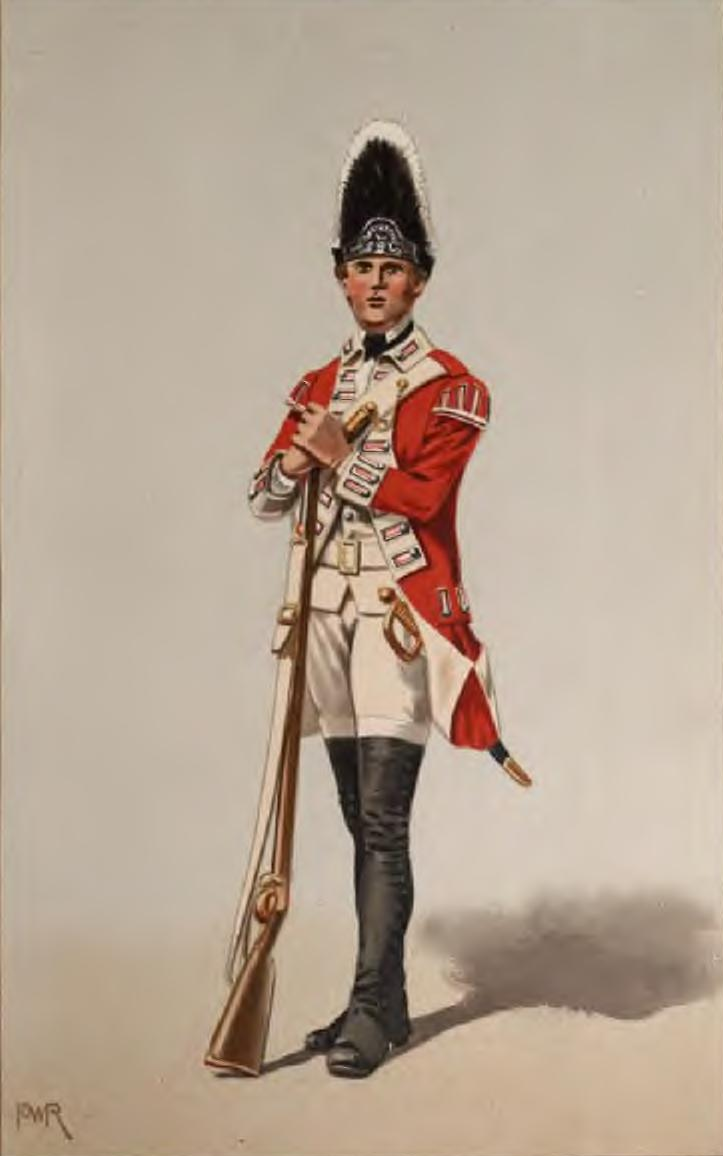
A regimental grenadier in 1767

The regiment moved to Barbados in December 1761 and then took part in the Battle of Havana in June 1762. In June 1763 the regiment rotated out of Havana to Annapolis Royal where it served until 1767 when it was transferred to Ireland. This would be the first time in its 48-year history that the British regiment would serve on British soil.

=== American Revolution ===
The regiment landed in Boston for service in the American Revolutionary War in June 1775. It was evacuated from Boston in March 1776 and went to Halifax from where a detachment was sent to Georgia to gather rice for the army in June 1776. It saw action at the Battle of Long Island in August 1776, the Battle of Fort Washington in November 1776 and the Battle of Princeton in January 1777. It was in combat again at the Battle of Brandywine in September 1777 and the Battle of Germantown in October 1777. In November 1778 the regiment embarked for Barbados and took part in the Battle of St. Lucia in December 1778. The regiment was then based in Antigua until June 1781 when it returned to Staten Island and then took part in the Battle of Groton Heights in September 1781: Major William Montgomery, commanding the regiment was killed in the assault. In August 1782, the regiment took a county title as the 40th (the 2nd Somersetshire) Regiment of Foot. The regiment embarked for home in November 1783.

=== French Revolutionary and Napoleonic Wars ===
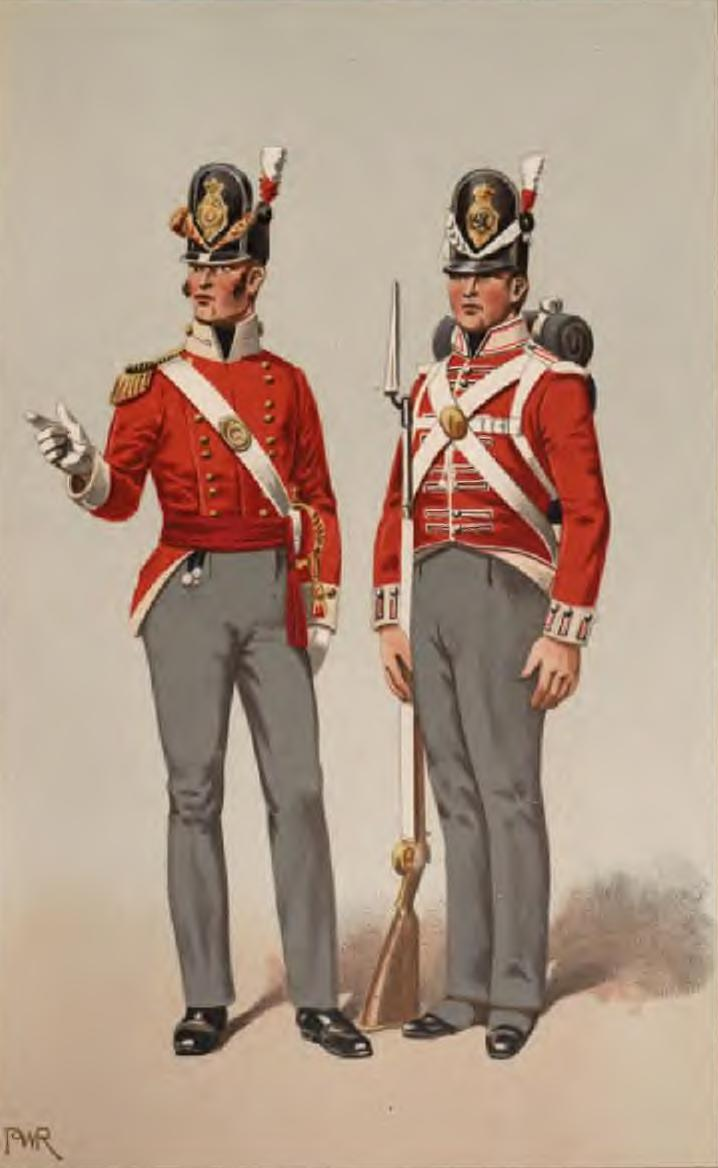
A regimental lieutenant and private in 1815

In January 1794 the regiment embarked for Barbados for service in the French Revolutionary Wars and took part in the capture of Martinique in March 1794 and the invasion of Guadeloupe in April 1794: following the French recapture of the island in December a portion of the regiment became French prisoners of war and were held on Guadeloupe for over a year before being released. The rest of the regiment returned home and in June 1794 embarked for Ostend: the regiment was not significantly engaged and returned home again in April 1795. The regiment returned to the West Indies in summer 1795 and took part in an attack on Saint Vincent in September 1795. It moved to Saint-Domingue in July 1797 before returning home in December 1798. The regiment also took part in the Anglo-Russian invasion of Holland in August 1799 and fought at the Battle of Bergen in September 1799 and the Battle of Alkmaar in October 1799 before returning home in November 1799.

The regiment also took part in the expedition to the Mediterranean and fought at the Battle of Abukir and Battle of Alexandria in March 1801 and then returned to England in October 1801. The regiment was part of the force assembled for the invasions of the River Plate in September 1806 and took part in the attack on Battle of Montevideo in February 1807 before returning to England in December 1807.

In July 1808 the regiment embarked for Portugal, as part of Sir Arthur Wellesley's army, for service in the Peninsular War. It fought at the Battle of Roliça in August 1808, the Battle of Vimeiro later that month and the Battle of Talavera in July 1809. The regiment also took part in the Battle of Bussaco in September 1810 and then fell back to the Lines of Torres Vedras in October 1810. The regiment later took part in the Siege of Ciudad Rodrigo in January 1812, the Siege of Badajoz in March 1812 and the Battle of Salamanca in July 1812 as well as the Battle of Vitoria in June 1813. It then pursued the French Army into France and fought at the Battle of the Pyrenees in July 1813, the Battle of Nivelle in November 1813 and the Battle of Orthez in February 1814 before also taking part Battle of Toulouse in April 1814. The regiment returned home in June 1814. In October 1814 the regiment was sent to New Orleans for service in the War of 1812 but recalled upon the ending of that conflict in March 1815.

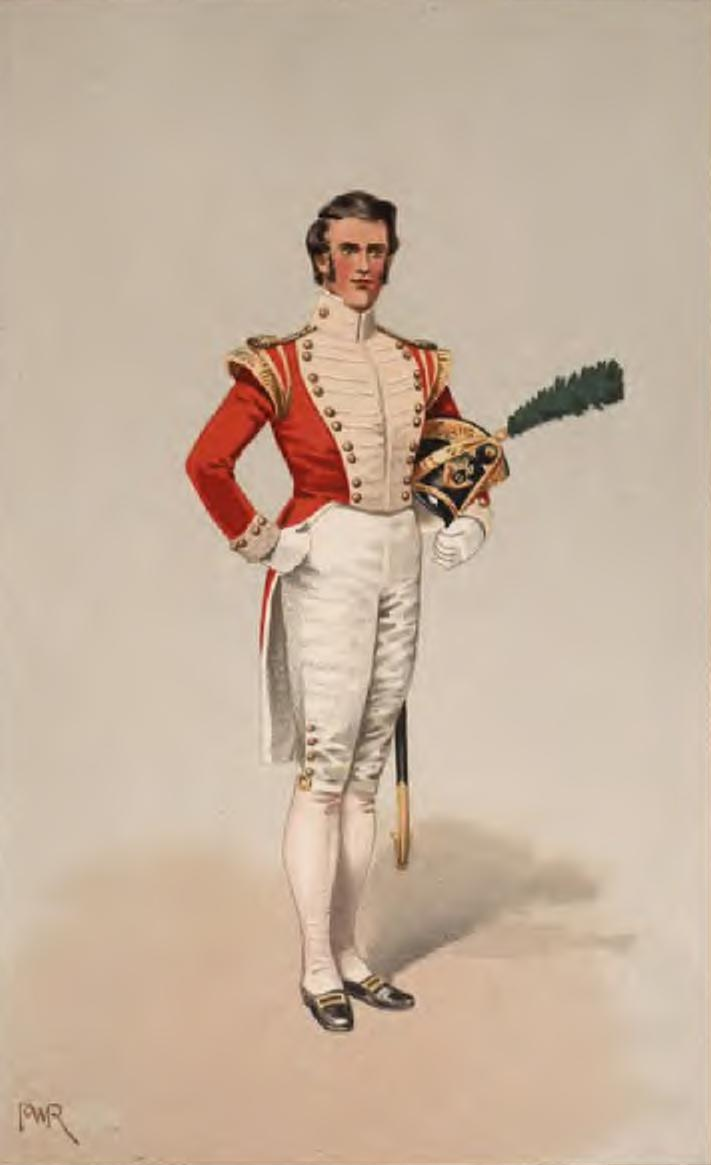
A regimental light company officer in 1826

In May 1815 the regiment was rushed to join with Wellington's army just before the Battle of Waterloo commenced. Initially placed in reserve, they were later in the day moved to the centre of his line to a position near La Haye Sainte. They held firm all day and helped drive off Napoleon's final massed infantry attack, ultimately losing 170 killed or wounded, including their commanding officer Major Arthur Rowley Heyland. The regiment then formed part of the Army of Occupation until returning to England in April 1817.

=== Victorian era ===
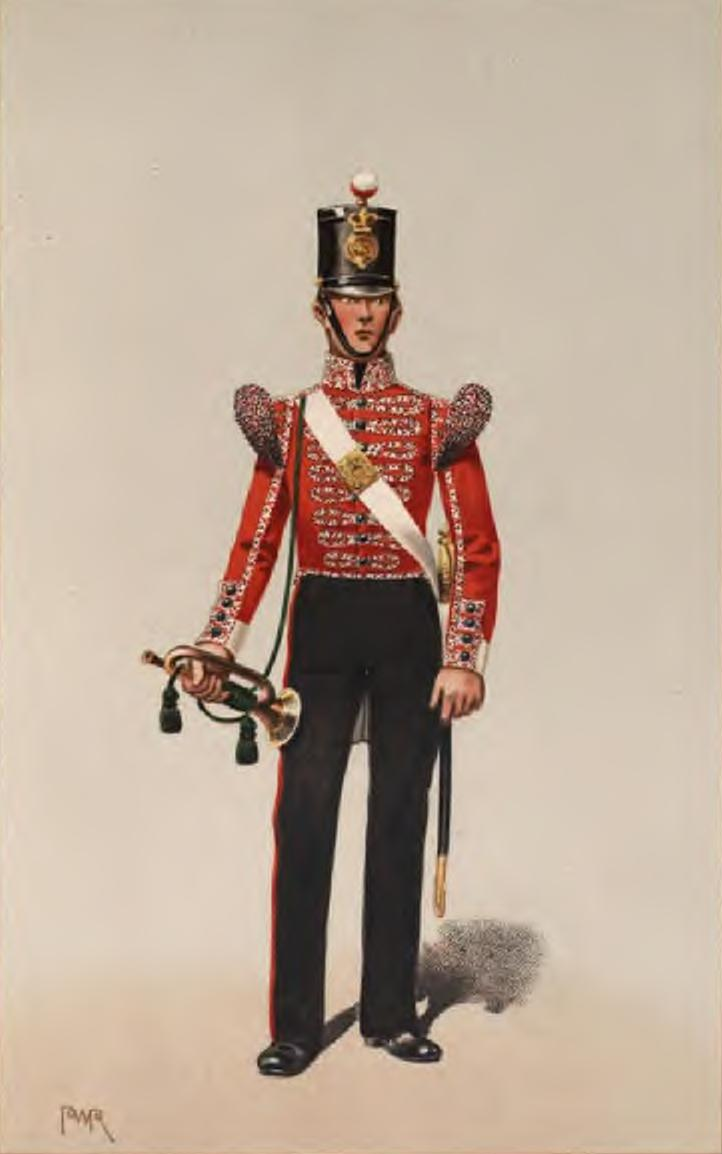
A regimental bugler in 1848

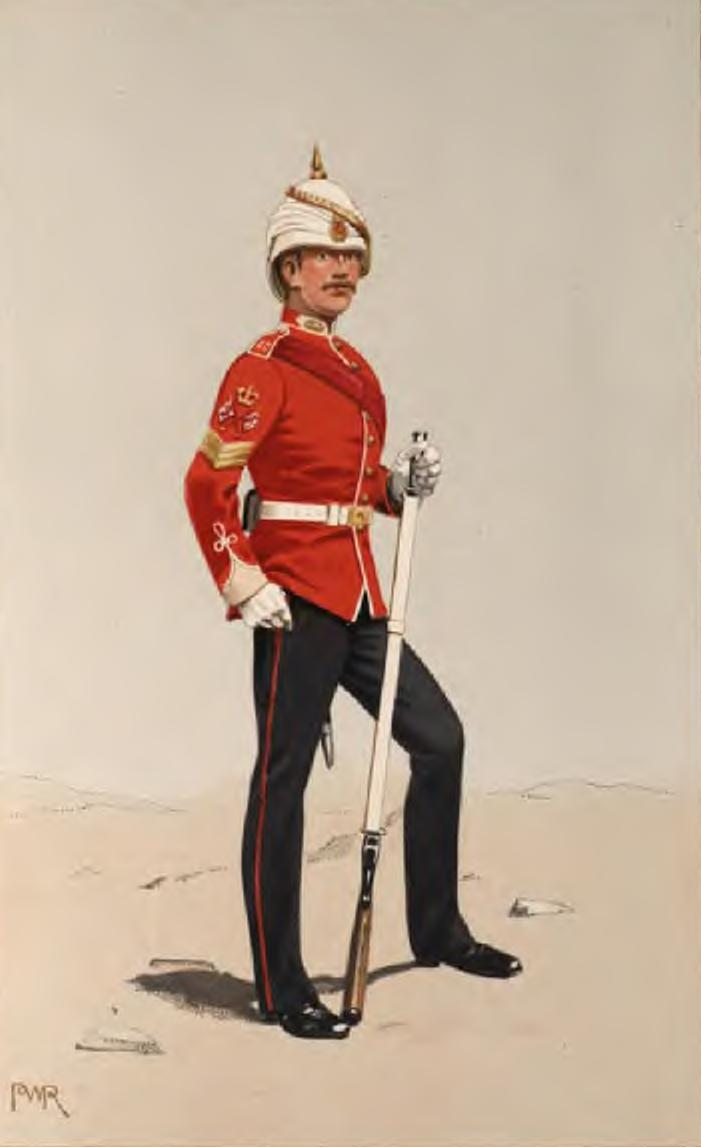
A regimental colour sergeant in 1881

In 1823 the regiment was dispatched in small detachments in convict ships to New South Wales where it served at both Sydney, and Van Diemen's Land, where they participated in the Black War. It was then transferred to Bombay, with the first units of the 40th leaving Australia in 1828. While in India, the regiment was stationed in Belgaum and then Pune before moving to Bombay. In January 1839 the regiment was sent to the Sindh and took part in the capture of Karachi. The regiment camped at Quetta on their way to Afghanistan where they experienced one of the worst out breaks of disease of any regiment of the British Army. It arrived in Kandahar in October 1841 and then fought under General William Nott at the Battle of Kabul in August 1842 during the First Anglo-Afghan War. The regiment returned to India in December 1842 and fought at the Battle of Maharajpore in December 1843 during the Gwalior campaign. It returned to England in September 1845.

The regiment returned to Australia in June 1852 and served in Victoria where it suppressed the Eureka Rebellion in December 1854. It also took part in the Taranaki and the Waikato campaigns in the early 1860s during the New Zealand Wars. The regiment arrived home in August 1866 but returned to India in September 1872.

As part of the Cardwell Reforms of the 1870s, where single-battalion regiments were linked together to share a single depot and recruiting district in the United Kingdom, the 40th was linked with the 82nd Regiment of Foot (Prince of Wales's Volunteers), and assigned to district no. 14 at Peninsula Barracks, Warrington. On 1 July 1881 the Childers Reforms came into effect and the regiment amalgamated with the 82nd Regiment of Foot (Prince of Wales's Volunteers) to form the Prince of Wales's Volunteers (South Lancashire Regiment).

== Battle honours ==
The battle honours of the regiment were as follows:

- Egypt, Montevideo, Roliça, Vimiero, Talavera, Badajoz, Salamanca, Vittoria, Pyrenees, Nivelle, Orthes, Peninsula, Toulouse, Waterloo, Candahar (1842), Ghuznee (1842), Cabool (1842), Maharajpore, New Zealand

== Colonels of the Regiment ==
Colonels of the regiment were:

- 1717–1750: Lt-Gen. Richard Philipps
- 1750–1752: Lt-Gen. Hon. Edward Cornwallis

=== The 40th Regiment of Foot ===
- 1752–1759: Maj-Gen. Peregrine Thomas Hopson
- 1759–1760: Maj-Gen. Hon. John Barrington
- 1760–1770: Lt-Gen. Robert Armiger
- 1770–1786: Lt-Gen. Sir Robert Hamilton, 4th Baronet of Silvertonhill

=== The 40th (2nd Somersetshire) Regiment ===
- 1786–1818: Gen. Sir George Osborn, 4th Baronet
- 1818–1829: Gen. Sir Brent Spencer, GCB
- 1829–1834: Gen. Sir James Kempt, GCB, GCH
- 1834–1837: Lt-Gen. Sir George Cooke, KCB
- 1837–1842: Lt-Gen. Sir Lionel Smith, 1st Baronet, GCB, GCH
- 1842–1861: F.M. Sir Alexander George Woodford, GCB, GCMG
- 1861–1872: Gen. Richard Greaves
- 1872–1881: Gen. Augustus Halifax Ferryman, CB

== See also ==
- Battle of the Eureka Stockade
- Louisbourg Grenadiers

== Sources ==
- Allen, Joseph (1852). Battles of the British Navy. Henry George Bohn.
- Dunn, Brenda (2004). A History of Port-Royal/Annapolis Royal 1605–1800. Nimbus Publishing and the Historical Association of Annapolis Royal. ISBN 978-1551097404.
- Odgers, George (1988). Army Australia: An Illustrated History. Frenchs Forest, New South Wales: Child & Associates. ISBN 0-86777-061-9.
- Piers, Harry (1927). Regiments Raised in Nova Scotia. Nova Scotia Historical Society.
- Smythies, Captain Raymond R. H. (1894). Historical Records of the 40th (2nd Somersetshire) Regiment. Devonport: A. H. Swiss.
