= St. Julien's, Newfoundland and Labrador =

St Julien's
- Fishing Village
- Location of St Julien's in Newfoundland
- Coordinates: 51°06′17″N 55°44′43″W
- Country: Canada
- Province: Newfoundland and Labrador

Population (2021)
  - Total: 10
- Time zone: UTC-3:30 (Newfoundland Time)
  - Summer (DST): UTC-2:30 (Newfoundland Daylight)
- Area code: 709
- Highways: Route 438

St. Julien's, also known as Grandois and Grandois-St. Julien's, is a small fishing community on the eastern shores of the Great Northern Peninsula on the island of Newfoundland in the Canadian province of Newfoundland and Labrador. The community is accessible via an unpaved road, Route 438, which branches off of Route 432 near the community of Main Brook.

Near the community is an abandoned copper mine which has been recently re-discovered with potential new mining quantities.

During King George's War, the village was attacked in the Newfoundland Campaign (1744).

St. Julien Island appears on the earliest maps of Newfoundland. The French fished in the area as early as the 1500s. Along with the nearby harbours of Grandois and St. Julien, this was a popular destination for French vessels because of its close proximity to the administrative headquarters at Croque. Grandois, pronounced GRAND-swah, comes from the French Les Grandes Oyes, meaning Great Geese. Bricks from French bread ovens, gravesites and engravings have been found throughout the area.

In 1822, the French hired George McGrath as the guardian of their fishing premises during the winter months. By 1857 other settlers had appeared, and after 1874, the French had moved most of their fishing operations farther north.

The permanent population of Grandois and St. Julien's never surpassed 135 people and by the 1980s the smaller harbours had been vacated, with some of the people moving to Grandois. The fish plant by the government wharf operated until 1992 when the provincial fishing moratorium ended the 400-year tradition of inshore fishing in the region. Today's community calls itself Grandois or St. Julien's interchangeably.

== See also ==
- List of cities and towns in Newfoundland and Labrador
- Newfoundland and Labrador Route 432
- Newfoundland and Labrador Route 438
