= Chimney Bay =

Natural bay in Newfoundland, Canada

Coordinates: 50.800°N 56.148°W

Chimney Bay is a natural bay located on the east coast of the Great Northern Peninsula, Newfoundland, Canada. It is one of two narrow indrafts of Canada Bay, the other being Bide Arm. The promontory that separates Chimney Bay from Bide Arm is moderately high. The south extreme is called Lard Point, from which the coast curves northwestward to Lard Cove, and then to Marten Point, the east point of the entrance to Chimney Bay. The bay extends nearly 7 miles (11 km) northeast from Marten Point, where it is .75 miles (1.21 km) wide. This coast is rugged and fringed by rocks.
