= Conche, Newfoundland and Labrador =

Conche
- Town
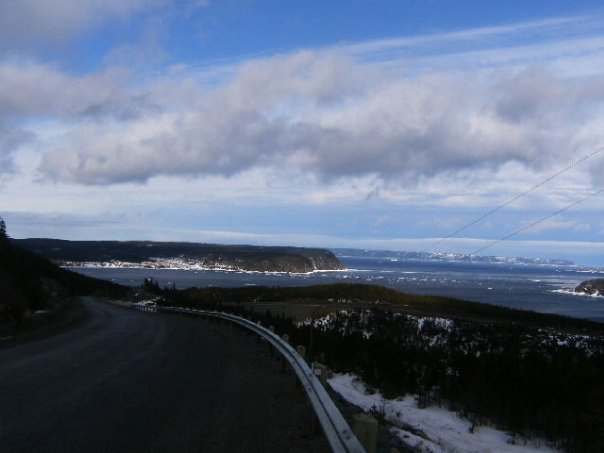

- Location of Conche in Newfoundland
- Coordinates: 50°54′N 55°54′W
- Country: Canada
- Province: Newfoundland and Labrador

Population (2021)
  - Total: 149
- Time zone: UTC-3:30 (Newfoundland Time)
  - Summer (DST): UTC-2:30 (Newfoundland Daylight)
- Area code: 709
- Highways: Route 434
- Conche Lighthouse
- Constructed: 1914 (first)
- Foundation: concrete
- Construction: wooden tower (first) aluminium skeletal tower (current)
- Height: 4 metres (13 ft) (first); 6.7 metres (22 ft)
- Shape: square frustum tower with balcony (first) quadrangular tower with light (current)
- Markings: white tower (first) skeletal tower with red and white daymark (current)
- Power source: solar power
- Operator: Village of Conche
- First lit: 1992 (current)
- Deactivated: 1992 (first)
- Focal height: 6.7 metres (22 ft)
- Range: 4 nmi (7.4 km; 4.6 mi)
- Characteristic: Fl R 6s

Conche (/kɒntʃ/ KONCH) is a community on the Northern Peninsula of Newfoundland and Labrador, Canada. Its population in 2021 was 149.

== The community ==
Conche is located on the sheltered southwest side of a small bay formed by the south side of a T-shaped peninsula, called the Conche Peninsula, which is joined to the mainland by a short, slender isthmus. Although the area mostly consists of steep cliffs, the settlement is concentrated on gentle sheltered slopes and in the small covers north and south of the isthmus. The settlement to the immediate north of the isthmus was Cape Rouge (later Northeast and Southwest Crouse).

=== History (1700s–1900) ===
The community of Conche is that central and western area south of the isthmus which includes Stage Cove. According to E.R. Seary (1960) Conche was mentioned on a map, published in 1613, that was based on Champlain's voyage of 1612, and Seary speculates that the name Conche is possibly derived from the French family Chibon or Chiban, or from the placename Conches, an abbey in Normandy. Conche was also La Couche in fisheries reports in the 1850s and 1860s.

According to D.W. Prowse (1895) Conche harbor was the scene of an encounter between British warships and French fishing in 1702. H.A. Innis (1940) suggests that both French and English fishing fleets used Conche for at least a century before the French employed some English settlers to remain permanently as gardiens. Patrick O'Neill (n.d.) relates that, according to oral history, no French came to Conche during the Napoleonic War and that several men from southern Newfoundland built summer fishing rooms in Conche.

Innis states that in 1764 Conche sheltered three British ships, 164 men and 23 boats, while the French Occupied Cape Rouge. In 1786 Conche and Cape Rouge were the ports of 22 French ships and 2,040 fishing servants of the Granvillais, and there were apparently complaints of Indian disturbances. Innis states that in 1787–88, the Slade ledgers of Battle Harbour showed Thomas Riggs, John Tilsed, William Griffin, Ben Brooke, William Cake, James Warne, William Wherry, James Vincent, William Enos, Matthew Legg were fishermen based in Conche, while in 1792 Twelve French ships were reportedly based in Conche (H.A. Innis: 1940). From 1713 to 1904 Conche came within the boundary of the French Shore, and with Croque, Quirpon, Englee, La Scie and Fleur de Lys it was a major site of French Shore fishing activities. As such, the need for gardiens (year round inhabitants engaged by the French to protect their gear and premises in the winter) arose and by 1800 at least one family had settled at Conche. According to John Dower (aged 38 in 1859), his father James herbert Dower, was "the first man who came to Conche, I believe, about sixty years ago or more that is, c. 1790... for some years he was about the only person. The next settler was a man by the name of Joyce".

According to Patrick O'Neill, Joyce was a native of County Galway, Ireland. Other early settlers included John and Thomas Casey; Pat Carroll, a native of Gowran Village, County Kilkenny, Ireland; John Bromley, a native of Jersey, Channel Islands; an Irishman from the Southern Shore or South Coast of Newfoundland, who came to Conche via Conche Fishot; Martin Flynn, a native of Northern Ireland who was keeper of the French rooms; and a Kearsey, also a native of Ireland.

By 1857 the first census of the community listed 101 inhabitants (sixteen families), all Irish Roman Catholics, but the settlement was much larger during the French fishing season. In 1858 Conche had nine areas assigned to the French: these had a population of 244 migratory French fishermen, and it was one of 51 harbours which had a Roman Catholic Chapel "erected ...by the French Captaine" which was visited by a priest who lived at Cape Rouge. According to O'Neill a Captain Alano operated a large room on a point which still bears his name, and that the priest and chapel were attached to this room, which was later the site of a Roman Catholic church built by the permanent residents of Conche.

Relations between the French and Irish settlers were ambivalent. The settlers served as protectors of the French property and George Casey reports that many of them were bilingual. The population grew rapidly and by 1867 a school was reported operating in Conche. Although there were concurrent fishing rights on the French Shore, the settlers, who were allowed to settle at Conche by the French, complained frequently that the French infringed on their lucrative salmon fishery. The French Admirals repeatedly warned the gardiens about their incursions into French fishing territory and English captains frequently investigated complaints and incidents on behalf of both parties. A typical report was a Captain Hamilton's dispatch in July 1864: at Conche he inquired about Facey, a settler son had interfered with French cod seines; and about another settler named Bromley whose stage's extensions interfered with the French rooms. The captain concluded that "This is the only place I have visited where a really ill-feeling exists between English and French, owing in a great measure to the English being prevented from putting down salmon nets, it being an excellent salmon post". Incidents continued although they seemed minor enough: In 1875, the captain of a French brig complained that John Casey and other inhabitants had "stripped" his ship; however the investigating British officer concluded "on the whole I believe, the fisherman of the two nations get on well together". In 1876 it was reported that the last French fishing rooms had been abandoned in 1867, however, the French based at La Scie continued to fish in the area, mainly cod, squid and herring, while by 1874 the 180 Conche settlers had exclusive use of the harbour from which they continued to prosecute the lucrative salmon fishery. It was reported that "Conche is a great bay for salmon, and as the French do not interfere, it is the principal fishery.... The total catch was quoted ... at from two hundred to two thousand barrels". Settlers listed at this time were Joy, Kenney, Casey, Pine, Carroll, Kearsey, Hunt, Dower, Fitzpatrick, Ralph, Byrne, Linfield, Bromley, Martin, Flinn and Flynn. Later settlers included the Hunt, O'Neill, Carey (Carew), Emberly and Whalen families. By 1901 the population stood at 298 and by 1945 it had risen to 482. In 1963 eighty-four people in nine families resettled in Conche from the Grey Islands and by 1966 the population was reported to be 624.

=== Recent history ===
The salmon fishery declined after 1900 and the economy of Conche was based principally on salted cod (the annual catch in 1954 was 152410 kg, 336,000 lbs.) and, later fresh cod sold in the 1950s to the fish-plant at Englee. From 1860 to 1960 fishing, including some fishing in Labrador in the early 1900s, was undertaken in family crews. After 1950 the fishery was principally small-boat inshore, until 1968 when longliners were built to prosecute the Labrador fishery. Salmon was caught and sold fresh, and some sealing was undertaken. A salmon cannery and cod oil refinery operated from about 1920 - 1930. In the 1960s a salt-fish plant operated in the community, which was later converted in the 1970s to frozen processing. In 1980 approximately 1810000 kg (4,000,000 lbs.) of cod was caught by traps, longliners, gillnetters and trawlers.

The first school in Conche was established about 1860 but it was 1890 before education was provided on a continual basis, this after a schoolhouse was built with the aid of a government grant in 1883. In that year the Roman Catholic School inspector reported "A new school house is course of erection... The school here had been taught in a private house; $80 was given in aid. A young girl belonging to the place is attending the Convent School at Pictow, N.S., to qualify her to take charge of the school. New schools were built c. 1904, 1943 and finally 1971. A telegraph office was established in 1912 and a nursing station opened in 1960. The community was supplied by coastal boat until the building of the road to Conche in 1969, and from 1960 to 1974 a 305 m (1000 ft.) gravel airstrip was in operation. In 1978 the United Maritime Fishermen opened a fish plant, which employed twenty people (fifty-six at peak) producing processed cod, salmon and herring which was exported to mainland Canada and the United States. In 1981 there was a government wharf and a community stage built in Conche as well as numerous other private wharves. The settlement had a post office, a nursing station, a modern Roman Catholic Church, and a school which served students from Kindergarten to Grade Eleven.

== Demographics ==
In the 2021 Census of Population conducted by Statistics Canada, Conche had a population of 149 living in 76 of its 120 total private dwellings, a change of −12.4% from its 2016 population of 170. With a land area of 10.03 km^{2} (3.87 sq mi), it had a population density of 14.9/km^{2} (38.5/sq mi) in 2021.

== See also ==
- Great Northern Peninsula
- List of lighthouses in Canada
- Roddickton-Bide Arm
