= Canada Bay, Newfoundland and Labrador =

Natural bay in Canada

Location of Canada Bay in Newfoundland

Canada Bay is a natural bay located on the east coast of the Great Northern Peninsula, Newfoundland, Canada. It is home to some spectacular scenery and is divided into two narrow indrafts, Chimney Bay and Bide Arm. The entrance to Canada Bay is between Canada Head (50°43′11″N 56°06′47″W) and Cape Daumalen (50°41′29″N 56°06′50″W).
