= Louisbourg Grenadiers =

The Louisbourg Grenadiers was a temporary unit of grenadiers formed by General James Wolfe in 1759 to serve with British Army forces in the Quebec campaign of the Seven Years' War.

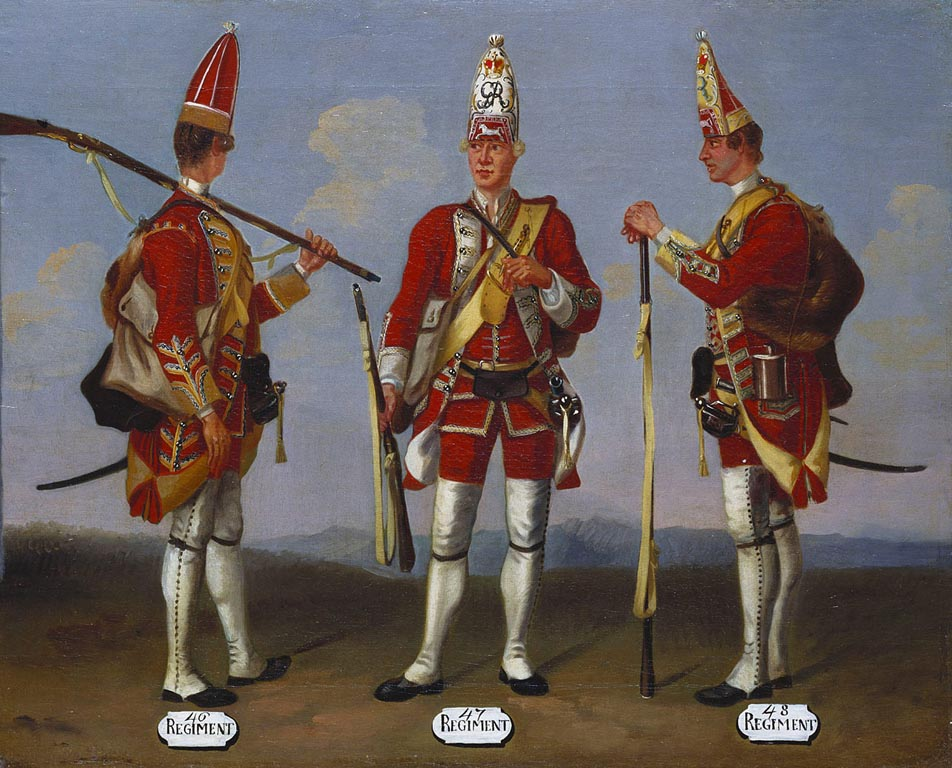
Grenadier privates.

Grenadiers from the 22nd, 40th, and 45th regiments were brought together by Wolfe at the Fortress of Louisbourg in Nova Scotia in preparation for action along the St. Lawrence River. The unit was involved in numerous battles during the months-long prelude to the Battle of the Plains of Abraham, including the ill-fated Battle of Beauport on July 31, 1759. After Quebec City's capture, the Grenadiers went on to be involved in the fall of Montreal the next year. After the end of the Seven Years' War, the unit was disbanded and its members returned to their original regiments.
