= Croque, Newfoundland and Labrador =

Settlement in Newfoundland and Labrador, Canada

Coordinates: 51.058°N 55.837°W

Location of Croque in Newfoundland and Labrador

Croque is a designated place on the Great Northern Peninsula in the Canadian province of Newfoundland and Labrador.

== Geography ==
Croque is in Newfoundland within Subdivision F of Division No. 9.

== Demographics ==
As a designated place in the 2021 Census of Population conducted by Statistics Canada, Croque recorded a population of 45 down from its 2016 population of 51. With a land area of 3.13 km^{2} (1.21 sq mi), it had a population density of 16.3/km^{2} (42.2/sq mi) in 2016.

== See also ==
- List of communities in Newfoundland and Labrador
- List of designated places in Newfoundland and Labrador
- Newfoundland and Labrador Route 432
- Newfoundland and Labrador Route 438
