= Battle of the Plains of Abraham =

1759 British–French battle near Quebec City

- Part of the Seven Years' War
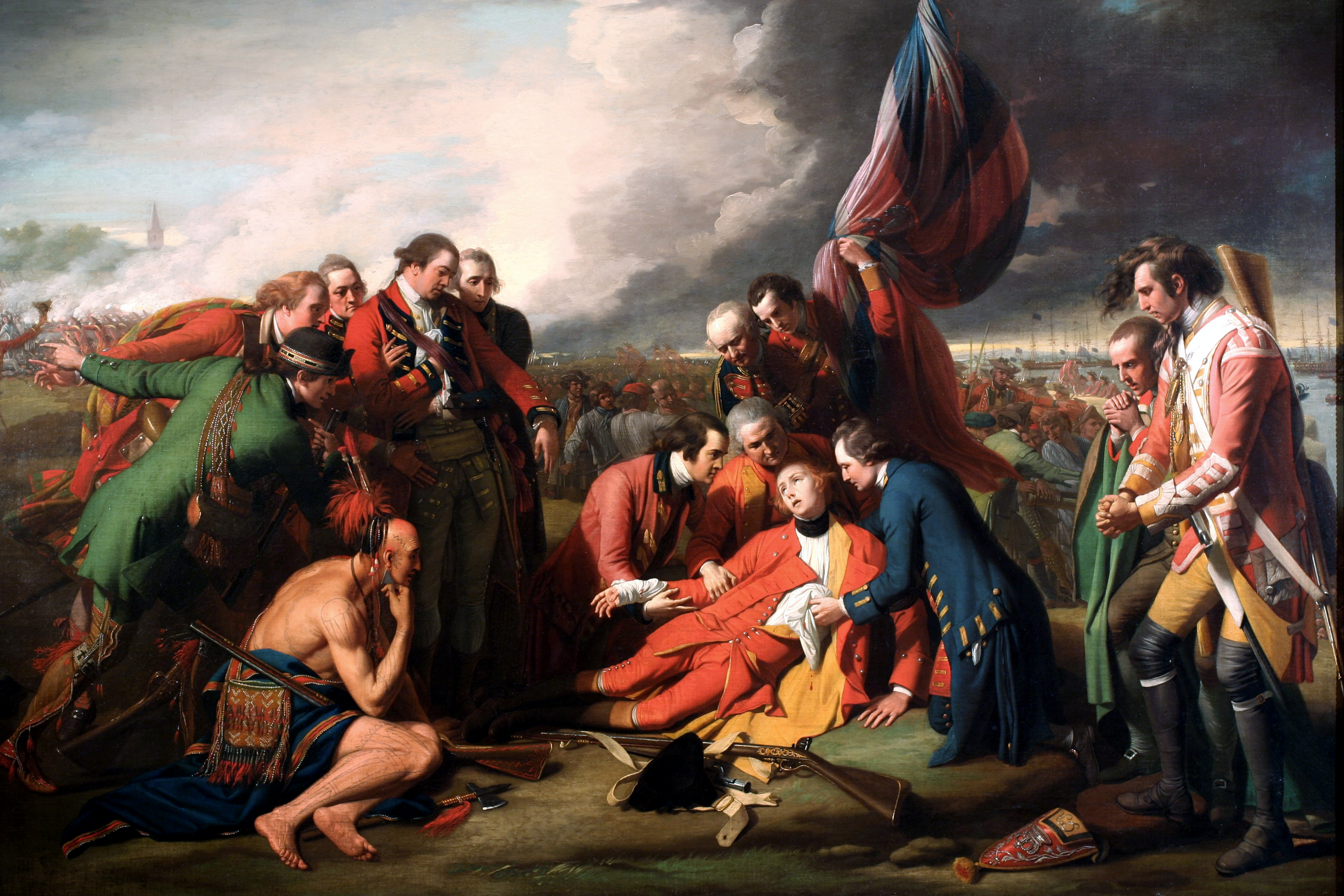
- The Death of General Wolfe; Benjamin West, 1770
Date	13 September 1759
Location	Plains of Abraham, Quebec, New France 46.8015°N 71.2201°W
Result	British victory

Belligerents
Great Britain: British America	France: French Canada; Mi'kmaq; Maliseet; Abenaki; Potawatomis; Odawa; Wendat

Commanders and leaders
James Wolfe †; Robert Monckton; George Townshend; William Howe; James Murray; Charles Saunders	Montcalm †; Lévis; Vergor; Langlade; Ramezay; Bougainville

Strength
4,400 regulars and colonial rangers	3,400 men 1,900 regulars 1,500 colonial militia and natives

Casualties and losses
58 killed 600 wounded	116 killed 600 wounded 350 captured
- Location within Quebec

The Battle of the Plains of Abraham, also known as the First Battle of Quebec (French: Bataille des Plaines d'Abraham, Première bataille de Québec), was a pivotal battle in the Seven Years' War—whose North American theatre is referred to by Americans as the French and Indian War. The battle, which took place on 13 September 1759, was fought by the British Army and Royal Navy against the French Army on the Promontory of Quebec, a plateau just outside the walls of Quebec City on land that was originally owned by a farmer named Abraham Martin, hence the name of the location. The battle involved fewer than 10,000 troops in total, but proved to be a deciding moment in the conflict between France and Britain over the fate of the French colony of Canada or New France, influencing the history of Canada.

The culmination of a three-month siege by the British, the battle lasted about an hour. British troops commanded by General James Wolfe successfully resisted the column advance of French troops and Canadian militia under General Louis-Joseph, Marquis de Montcalm, employing new tactics that proved extremely effective against standard military formations used in most large European conflicts. Both generals were mortally wounded during the battle; Wolfe died of gunshot wounds just as the French began to retreat and Montcalm died the next morning after receiving a musket ball wound just below his ribs. In the wake of the battle, the French evacuated the city.

The French forces would attempt to recapture Quebec the following spring, and in the Battle of Sainte-Foy, they forced the British to retreat within the city's walls. However, the French failed to take the city and in 1763, following defeat in the Montreal campaign, France ceded most of its possessions in North America, including the colony of Canada, the Great Lakes and Ohio to Great Britain in the Treaty of Paris. The decisive success of the British forces on the Plains of Abraham and the subsequent capture of Quebec became part of what was known in Great Britain as the "Annus Mirabilis" of 1759.

== Overview ==
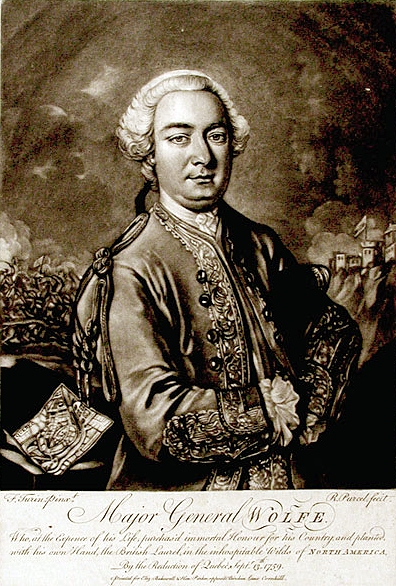
A portrait of Wolfe printed circa 1776

As the Seven Years' War entered its later stages through 1758 and 1759, French forces and colonies in northeastern North America came under renewed attack from British armies. In 1758 after their defeat in July at the Battle of Carillon, the British took Louisbourg in August, causing Atlantic Canada to fall into their hands, and opening the sea route to attack Quebec. The British also captured Fort Frontenac in the same month, costing the French supplies for the Ohio Valley campaign. When some of the Indian supporters of the French made peace with the British, France was forced to draw its troops back. The French leaders, specifically Governor de Vaudreuil and General Montcalm, were unsettled by the British successes. However, Quebec was still able to protect itself as the British prepared a three-pronged attack for 1759.

James Wolfe expected to lead 12,000 men, but was greeted by only approximately 7,000 regular troops, 400 officers, and 300 gunners. He was supported by a fleet of 49 ships and 140 smaller craft led by Vice-Admiral of the Blue Charles Saunders.

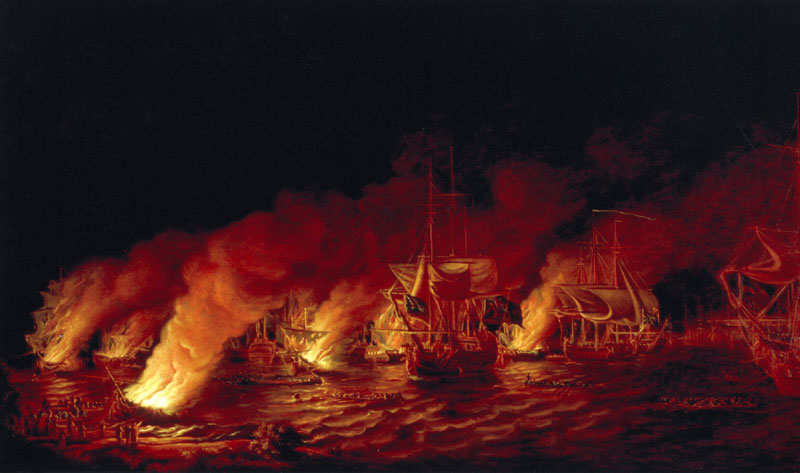
French fire ships sent downriver to block the British advance, as shown in a copy of a painting by Dominic Serres

In preparation for the fleet's approach to Quebec, James Cook surveyed a large portion of the river, including a dangerous channel known as The Traverse. Cook's ship was one of the first ships up the river, sounding the channel and guiding the fleet as it moved up; Wolfe and his men landed on the Île d'Orléans on 28 June. The French attempted to attack the fleet by sending seven fire ships downriver to disrupt the landing, but the ships were set afire too early and British sailors in longboats were able to pull the flaming craft clear of the fleet. The following day, Wolfe's troops landed on the south bank of the river at Point Levis, nearly directly across the river from Quebec; an artillery battery was established there in early July that nearly levelled the lower town by bombardment.

Despite an air of defeatism among the leadership, the French troops and New French militia defenders focused their preparations for British attacks on the Beauport Shore. Montcalm and his staff, Major-General François de Gaston, Chevalier de Lévis, Colonel Louis Antoine de Bougainville, and Lieutenant-Colonel de Sennezergue, distributed some 12,000 troops in a nine-kilometre-long collection of fortified redoubts and batteries from the Saint-Charles River to the Montmorency Falls, along the shallows of the river in areas that had previously been targeted by British attempts to land. Before the British, a small fleet of supply ships had arrived in Quebec with much-needed supplies. Those supplies, along with 500 reinforcements, likely aided French resistance during the lengthy siege.

Initial British landing, claiming the Point Levis and the unsuccessful attack on 31 August

Wolfe, on surveying the town of Beauport, found that the houses there had been barricaded and organized to allow for musket fire from within; they were built in an unbroken line along the road, providing a formidable barrier. In addition, a screen of trees along the Montmorency River made an approach on that route dangerous. On 31 July, the first serious attempt by Wolfe's troops to land on the northern shore led to the Battle of Beauport, also known as the Battle of Montmorency. Approximately 3,500 troops, supported by a heavy bombardment, attempted to land but were fired upon in the river shallows. Members of the Louisbourg Grenadiers, who reached the beach, attempted a generally undisciplined charge on the French positions, but came under heavy fire; a thunderstorm ended the fight and allowed Wolfe to pull his troops back after taking some 450 casualties to Montcalm's 60.

Some French officers felt the Montmorency defeat would be the last British attack; Vaudreuil wrote afterwards that "I have no more anxiety about Quebec. Wolfe, I assure you, will make no progress... He contented himself with losing about five hundred of his best soldiers." He predicted another attack would come within days. Others in the French camp felt the campaign was over.

For the remainder of the summer, Wolfe's focus changed, possibly due to frustration with Montcalm's tactics. Wolfe's troops, along with American Rangers, attacked and destroyed small French settlements along the St. Lawrence. An estimated 1,400 stone houses and manors were destroyed, and many colonists killed. The effort was likely an attempt to force Montcalm's army out of its fortifications, but was unsuccessful. However, the attacks did reduce the number of suppliers available to the French, especially as the British navy, unable to control the St. Lawrence entirely, was successful in blockading the ports in France.

== Preparations ==
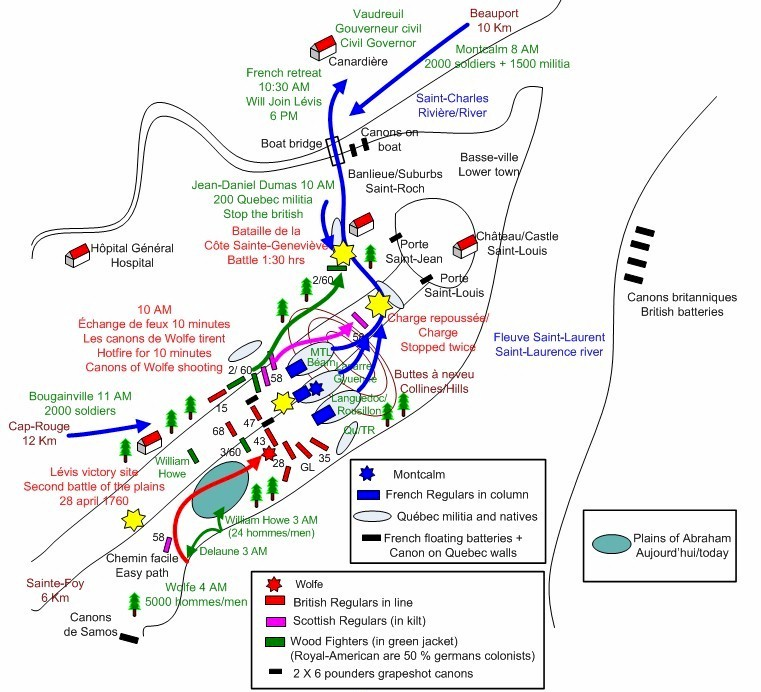
The Battle of the Plains of Abraham

Through the summer siege, illness spread through the British camps. In August, Wolfe himself was bedridden, causing already low morale to slump even further among the British troops. With many men in camp hospitals, British fighting numbers were thinned, and Wolfe personally felt that a new attack was needed by the end of September, or Britain's opportunity would be lost. In addition, his frustration with Montcalm's defensive stance continued to grow. In a letter to his mother, Wolfe wrote, "The Marquis of Montcalm is at the head of a great number of bad soldiers, and I am at the head of a small number of good ones that wish for nothing so much as to fight him; but the wary old fellow avoids an action, doubtful of the behaviour of his army." Montcalm also expressed frustration over the long siege, relating that he and his troops slept clothed and booted, and his horse was always saddled in preparation for an attack.

After considering and rejecting a number of plans for landings on the north shore, a decision was made in late August by Wolfe and his brigadiers to land upriver of the city. If successful, such a landing would force Montcalm to fight, as a British force on the north shore of the St. Lawrence would cut his supply lines to Montreal. Initial suggestions for landing sites ranged as far as 32 km (20 mi) up the St. Lawrence, which would have given the French troops one or two days to prepare for the attack. Following the failed British assault on Montmorency, Montcalm altered his deployment, sending Bougainville and a column of approximately 1,500 regular troops, 200 cavalry, and a group of New French militia—some 3,000 men in all—upriver to Cap-Rouge to monitor the British ships upstream. He further strengthened his defences of the Beauport shore following the abandonment of the British camp at Montmorency, which he regarded as preparations for a descent (amphibious attack) on Beauport. In spite of warnings from local commanders, he did not view an upstream landing as a serious possibility.

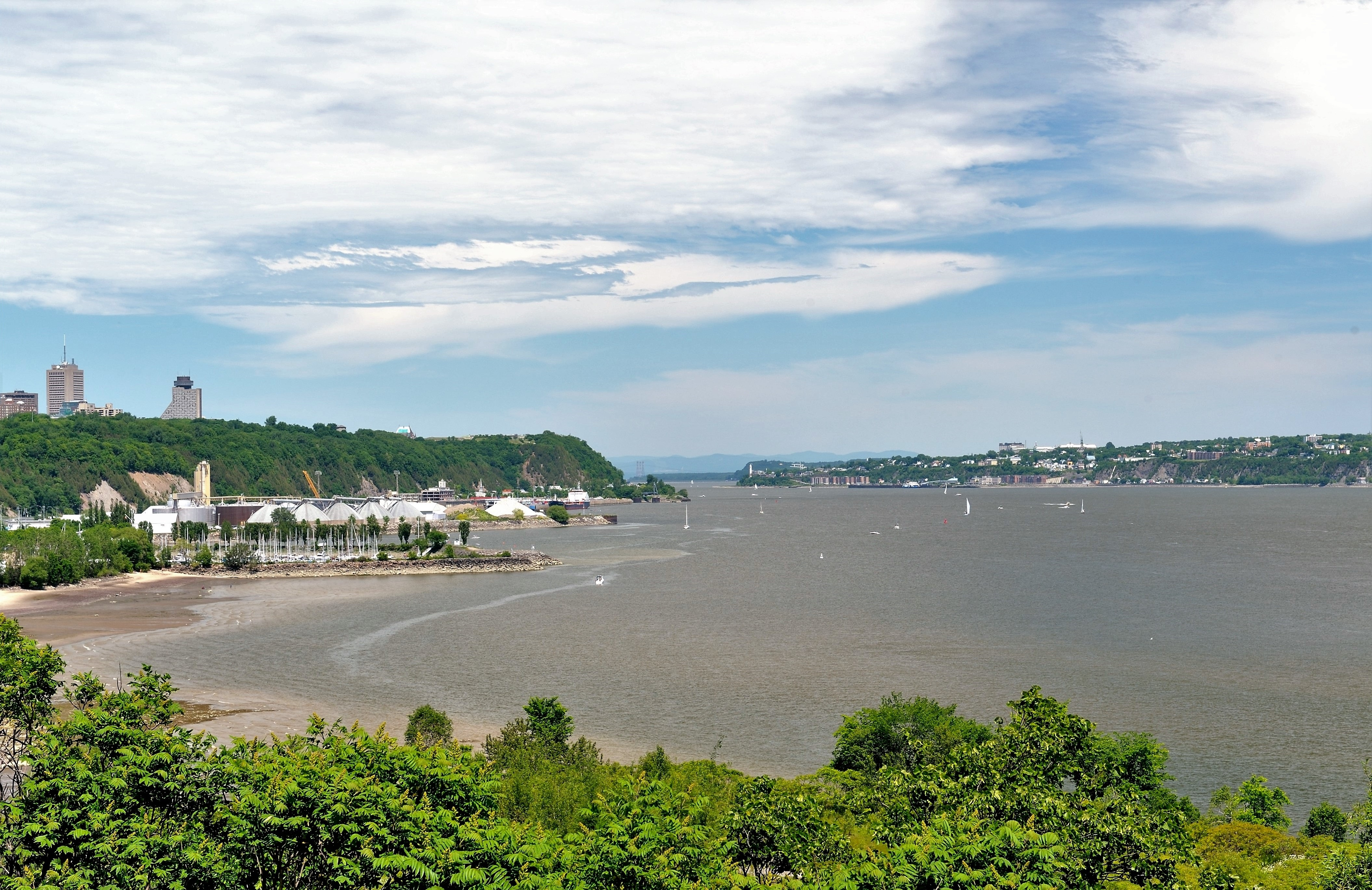
Anse au Foulon

The British, meanwhile, prepared for their risky deployment upstream. Troops had already been aboard landing ships and drifting up and down the river for several days when Wolfe on 12 September, made a final decision on the British landing site, selecting L'Anse-au-Foulon. L'Anse-au-Foulon is a cove situated west of the city, three kilometres upstream from Cap Diamant. It lies at the bottom of a 53 m (174 ft) high cliff leading to the plateau above, and was protected by a battery of guns. It is not known why Wolfe selected Foulon, as the original landing site was to be further up the river, in a position where the British would be able to develop a foothold and strike at Bougainville's force to draw Montcalm out of Quebec and onto the plains. Brigadier-General George Townshend wrote that "by some intelligence the General had, he has changed his mind as to the place he intended to land". In his final letter, dated HMS Sutherland, 8:30 p.m. 12 September, Wolfe wrote:

I had the honour to inform you today that it is my duty to attack the French army. To the best of my knowledge and ability, I have fixed upon that spot where we can act with most force and are most likely to succeed. If I am mistaken I am sorry for it and must be answerable to His Majesty and the public for the consequences.

Wolfe's plan of attack depended on secrecy and surprise. His plan required that a small party of men should land by night on the north shore, climb the Promontory of Quebec, seize a small road, and overpower the garrison that protected it, allowing the bulk of his army (5,000 men) to ascend the cliff by the small road and then deploy for battle on the plateau. Even if the first landing party succeeded in their mission and the army was able to follow, such a deployment would still leave his forces inside the French line of defence with no immediate retreat but the river. It is possible that Wolfe's decision to change the landing site was owing less to a desire for secrecy and more to his general disdain for his brigadiers (a feeling that was reciprocated); it is also possible that he was still suffering the effects of his illness and the opiates he used as painkillers. Some revisionist historians believe Wolfe ordered the attack believing the advanced guard would be repulsed, and anticipated dying gallantly with his men rather than returning home in disgrace.

== Order of battle ==
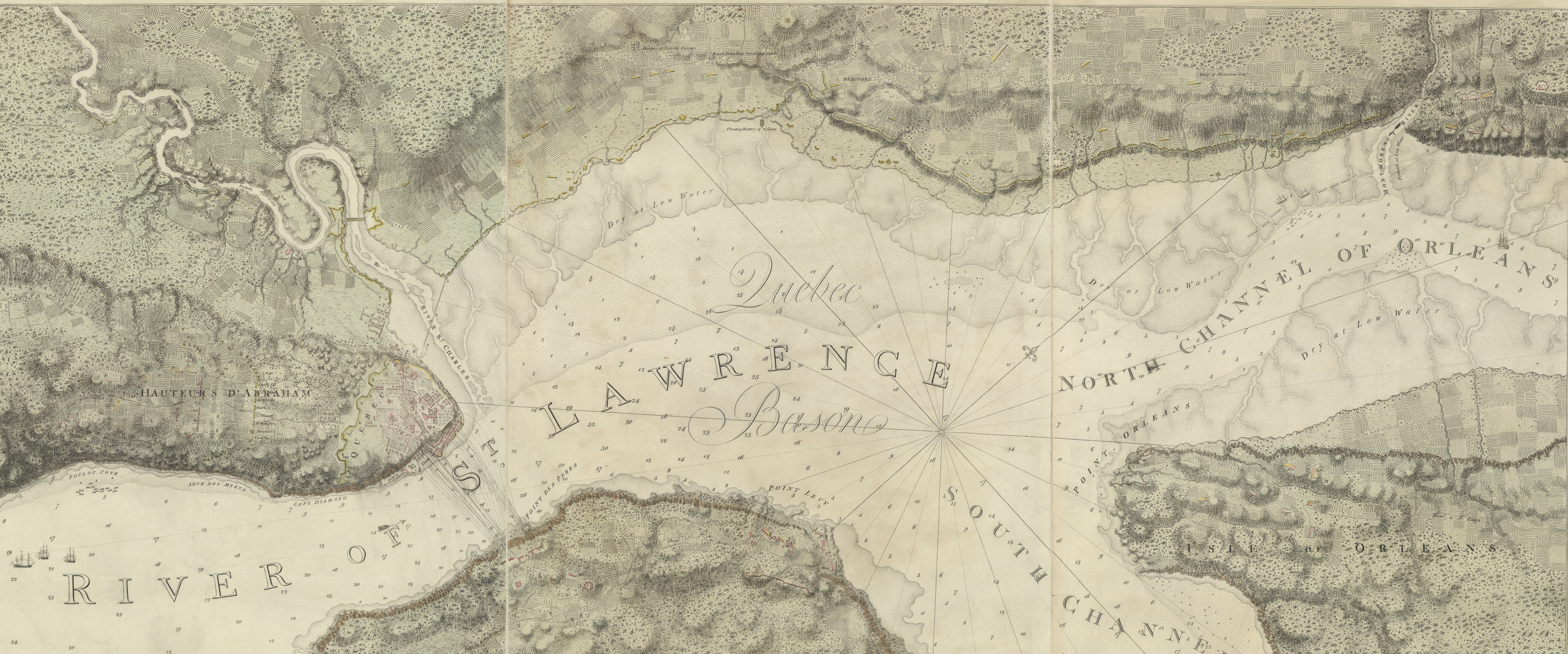
Plan of Quebec and environs with its defences and the occasional entrenched camps of the French commanded by Marquis de Montcalm shewing likewise the principal works and operations of the British forces, under the command of Major General Wolfe, during the siege of that place in 1759.

=== British forces ===
British forces engaged in the battle were commanded by Major General James Wolfe. There is disagreement on the total number of men and equipment that Wolfe took into combat, with numbers varying across sources. According to the Government of Canada website, which uses numbers from historian André Charbonneau, the British had 4,426 men, all British Army soldiers on the Plains of Abraham, along with two bronze 6-pounder (2.7 kg) cannon. Wolfe deployed his men as follows;

Main line (Centre)

- Louisbourg Grenadiers
- 28th Regiment of Foot
- 43rd Regiment of Foot
- 47th Regiment of Foot
- 58th Regiment of Foot
- 78th (Fraser's) Highlanders

Left

- 15th Regiment of Foot
- 2nd Battalion, 60th (Royal American) Regiment of Foot
- 3rd Battalion, 60th (Royal American) Regiment of Foot

Right

- En potence on the right flank – 35th Regiment of Foot

Reserve

- 48th Regiment of Foot

Rear

- The Light Infantry (80th Regiment of Light-Armed Foot)

=== French forces ===
French forces engaged were composed of a mix of both regular force and militia units along with Indian allies, numbers varying between sources again. The militia were poorly armed with rifles and no bayonets and the Indian allies were unfamiliar with European-style battle tactics. According to the Government of Canada website, using numbers provided by historian André Charbonneau, the French had 2,000 men of the French Army, 600 Canadians drafted into the regular force units, and another 1,800 militiamen and Indian allies. The French had more cannon than their British counterparts, but their numbers are not known. In the battle, they were commanded by Major-General Louis Joseph de Saint Véran, Marquis de Montcalm who deployed his forces as follows;

Right

- Militia

Centre

- La Sarre Regiment
- Languedoc Regiment
- Béarn Regiment

Left

- Guyenne Regiment
- Royal Roussillon Regiment
- Montréal and Trois-Rivières militia

== Landing ==
Landing of the British troops on 12 September

Bougainville, tasked with the defence of the large area between Cap Diamant and Cap Rouge, was upstream with his troops at Cap Rouge on the night of 12 September, and missed seeing numerous British ships moving downstream. A camp of approximately 100 militia led by Captain Louis Du Pont Duchambon de Vergor, who had unsuccessfully faced the British four years previously at Fort Beauséjour, had been assigned to watch the narrow road at L'Anse-au-Foulon which followed a streambank, the Coulée Saint-Denis. On the night of 12 September and morning of 13 September, however, the camp may have contained as few as 40 men, as others were off harvesting. Vaudreuil and others had expressed their concern at the possibility of L'Anse-au-Foulon being vulnerable, but Montcalm dismissed them, saying 100 men would hold off the army until daylight, remarking, "It is not to be supposed that the enemies have wings so that they can in the same night cross the river, disembark, climb the obstructed acclivity, and scale the walls, for which last operation they would have to carry ladders."

Sentries did detect boats moving along the river that morning, but they were expecting a French supply convoy to pass that night—a plan that had been changed without Vergor being notified. When the boats, loaded with the first wave of British troops, were challenged, a French-speaking officer, either a Captain Fraser or Captain Donald McDonald of the 78th Fraser Highlanders, was able to answer the challenge in excellent French, allaying suspicion.

The boats, however, had drifted slightly off course: instead of landing at the base of the road, many soldiers found themselves at the base of a slope. A group of 24 volunteers led by Colonel William Howe with fixed bayonets were sent to clear the picket along the road, and climbed the slope, a manoeuvre that allowed them to come up behind Vergor's camp and capture it quickly. Wolfe followed an hour later when he could use an easy access road to climb to the plain. Thus, by the time the sun rose over the Plains of Abraham, Wolfe's army had a solid foothold at the top of the cliffs of the promontory of Quebec.

== Battle ==
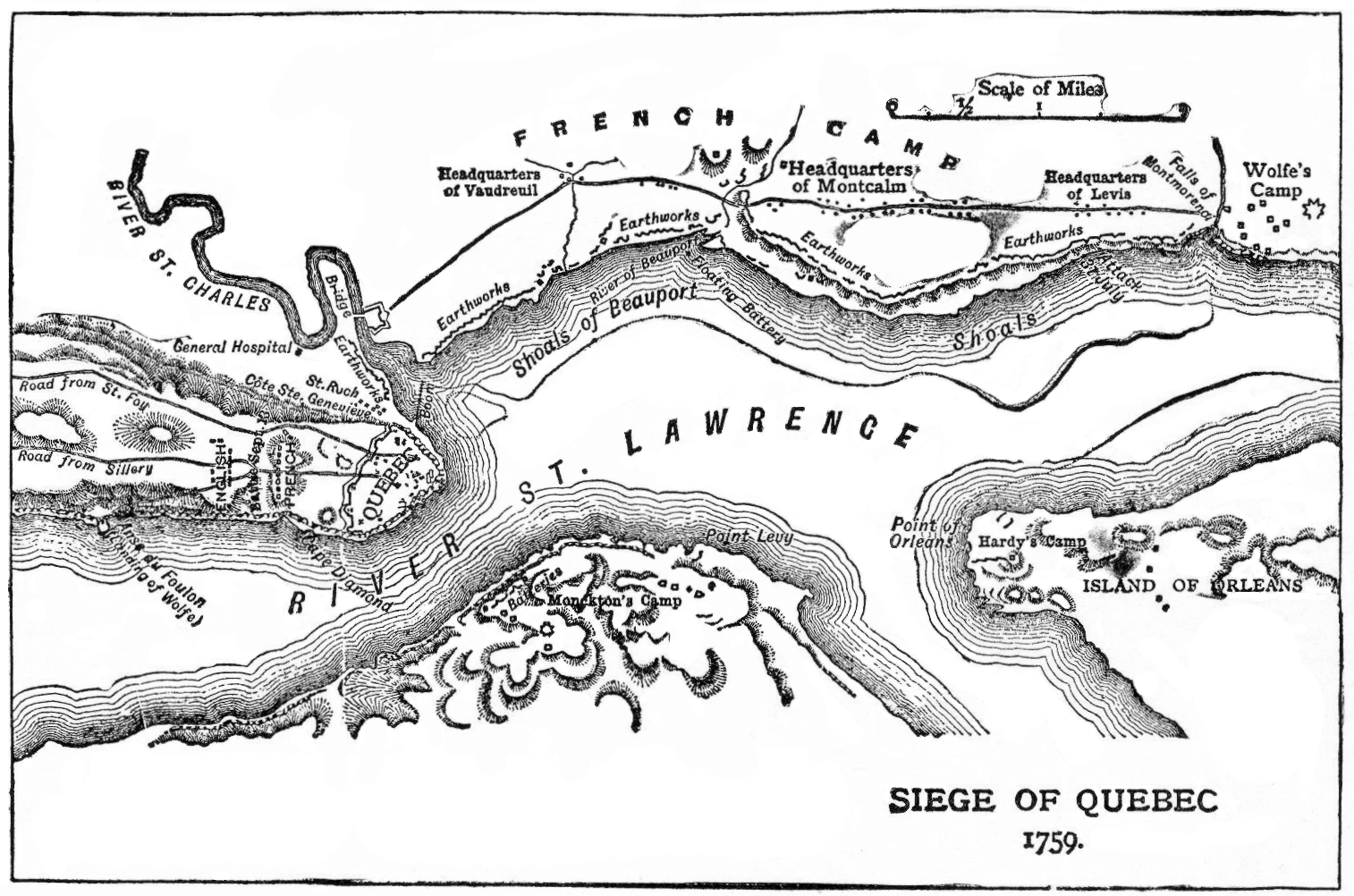
Map of the Quebec City area showing disposition of French and British forces. The Plains of Abraham are to the left.

The plateau was undefended save for Vergor's camp, as Vaudreuil had ordered one of the French regiments to relocate to the east of the city not long before the landing. Had the immediate defenders been more numerous, the British might have been unable to deploy or even been pushed back. An officer who would normally have patrolled the cliffs regularly through the night was unable to on the night of the 12th because one of his horses had been stolen and his two others were lame. The first notice of the landing came from a runner who had fled from Vergor's camp, but one of Montcalm's aides felt the man was mad and sent him away, then went back to bed. Saunders had staged a diversionary action off Montmorency, firing on the shore emplacements through the night and loading boats with troops, many of them taken from field hospitals; this preoccupied Montcalm.

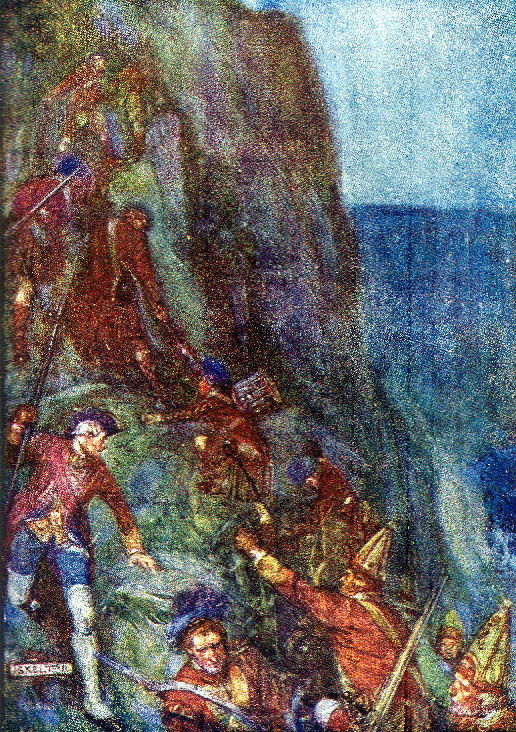
The British under General Wolfe climbing the heights of Quebec, 1759

Montcalm was taken aback to learn of the British deployment, and his response has been regarded as precipitate. Though he might have awaited reinforcement by Bougainville's column (allowing simultaneous frontal and rear attacks on the British position) or avoided battle while he concentrated his forces, or even yielded the city to Wolfe, he instead elected to confront Wolfe's force directly. Had he waited, the British would have been entirely cut off—they had nowhere to go but back down the Foulon, and would have been under fire the entire way. To an artillery officer named Montbelliard, Montcalm explained his decision thus: "We cannot avoid action; the enemy is entrenching, he already has two pieces of cannon. If we give him time to establish himself, we shall never be able to attack him with the troops we have."

=== First engagements ===
First phase of the battle

In total, Montcalm had 13,390 regular troops, Troupes de la Marine, and militia available in Quebec City and along the Beauport shore, as well as 200 cavalry, 200 artillery (including the guns of Quebec), 400 native warriors (including many Odawa under Charles de Langlade), and 140 Acadian volunteers, but most of these troops did not participate in the action. Many of the militia were inexperienced; the Acadian, Canadian, and indigenous irregulars were more used to guerrilla warfare. By contrast, the British 7,700 troops were almost all regulars.

On the morning of 13 September, Wolfe's army formed a line first with their backs to the river, then spread out across the Plains with its right anchored by the bluff along the St. Lawrence and its left by a bluff and thick wood above the St. Charles River. While the regular French forces were approaching from Beauport and Quebec, the Canadian militia and native sharpshooters engaged the British left flank, sheltering in the trees and scrub; the militia held these positions throughout the battle and fell back on this line during the general retreat, eventually holding the bridge over the St. Charles River.

Of the British troops, approximately 3,300 formed into a shallow horseshoe formation that stretched across the width of the Plains, the main firing line being roughly one kilometre long. Two battalions were deployed, facing north, to cover the left flank and a further two formed a reserve. In order to cover the entire plain, Wolfe was forced to array his soldiers two ranks deep, rather than the more conventional three ranks. On the left wing, regiments under Townshend exchanged fire with the militia in the scrub and captured a small collection of houses and gristmill to anchor the line. The defenders pushed the British from one house, but were repelled and, in retreat, lit several houses on fire to keep them out of enemy hands. Smoke from these fires wound up masking the British left, and may have confused Montcalm as to the width of the lines. As Wolfe's men waited for the defenders, the steady fire became intense enough that Wolfe ordered his men to lie down amid the high grass and brush.

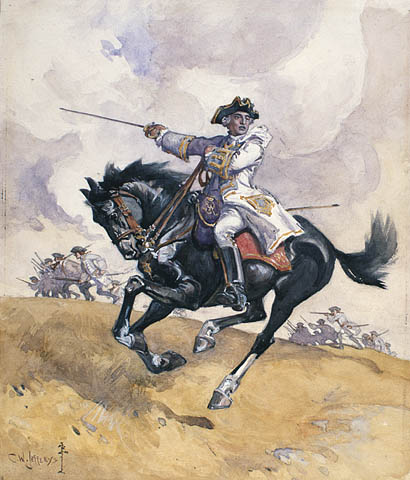
Montcalm leading his troops into battle. Watercolour by Charles William Jefferys (1869–1951)

As French troops arrived from Beauport, Montcalm, one of few mounted men on the field, decided that a swift assault was the only way to dislodge the British from their position. Accordingly, he deployed the forces immediately available in and near Quebec City and prepared an immediate attack, without waiting for further reinforcements from the Beauport shore. He arrayed his approximately 3,500 soldiers into place, his best regulars three deep, others six deep and his poorest regiment in column. At approximately 10 a.m., Montcalm, riding his dark horse and waving his sword to encourage his men, ordered a general advance on the British line.

As a European-trained military leader, Montcalm's instinct was for large, set-piece battles in which regiments and soldiers moved in precise order. Such actions required a disciplined soldiery, painstakingly drilled for as long as 18 months on the parade ground, trained to march in time, change formation at a word, and retain cohesion in the face of bayonet charges and musket volleys. Though his regular regiments (the "troupes de terre" or "metropolitans") were adept at such formal warfare, in the course of the campaign their ranks had been replenished by less professional militiamen, whose talents at forest warfare emphasised the individual: they tended to fire early and then drop to the ground to reload, thus reducing the effect of concentrated fire at close range.

=== Main engagement ===
French forces in retreat

As the French approached, the British lines held their fire. Wolfe had devised a firing method for stopping French column advances in 1755 that called for the centre—in this case, the 43rd and 47th Foot regiments—to hold fire while waiting for the advancing force to approach within 30 yd (27 m), then open fire at close range. The French held their fire and both armies waited for two or three minutes. The French finally fired two disorganized volleys.

Wolfe had ordered his soldiers to charge their muskets with two balls each in preparation for the engagement. Captain John Knox, serving with the 43rd Foot, wrote in his journal that as the French came within range, the regiments "gave them, with great calmness, as remarkable a close and heavy discharge as I ever saw". After the first volley, the British lines marched forward a few paces towards the shocked French force and fired a second general volley that shattered the attackers and sent them into retreat.

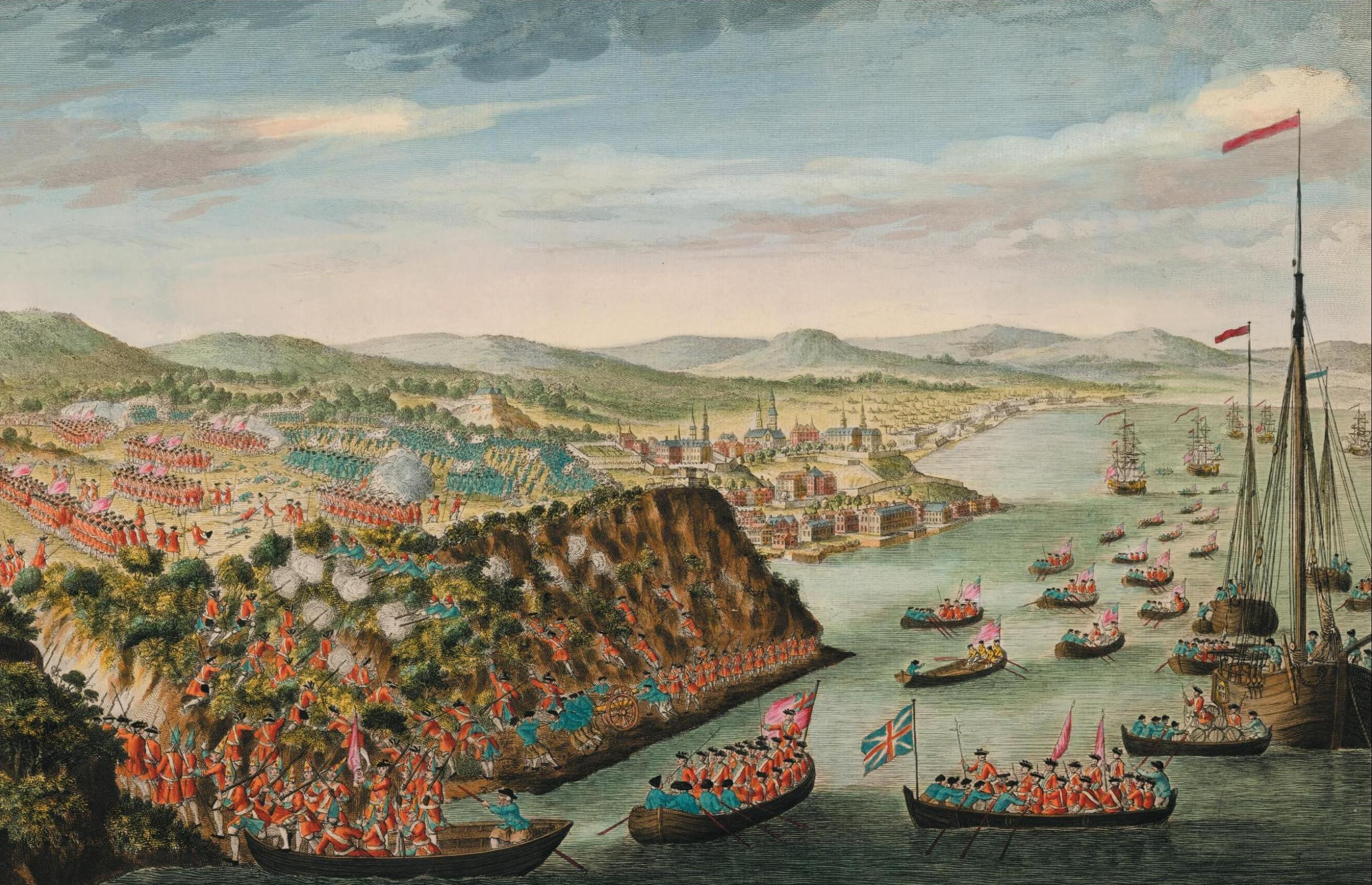
Engraving based on a sketch by Wolfe's aide-de-camp, Hervey Smythe, depicting the easy climb by Wolfe's soldiers

Wolfe, positioned with the 28th Foot and the Louisbourg Grenadiers, had moved to a rise to observe the battle; he had been struck in the wrist early in the fight, but had wrapped the injury and continued on. Volunteer James Henderson, with the Louisbourg Grenadiers, had been tasked with holding the hill, and reported afterwards that within moments of the command to fire, Wolfe was struck with two shots, one low in the stomach and the second, a mortal wound in the chest. Knox wrote that one of the soldiers near Wolfe shouted "They run, see how they run." Wolfe, on the ground, opened his eyes and asked who was running. Upon being told that the French had broken, he gave several orders, then turned on his side and said "Now, God be praised, I will die in peace", and died.

With Wolfe dead and several other key officers injured, British troops fell into a disorganized pursuit of the retreating French troops. The 78th Fraser Highlanders were ordered by Brigadier-General James Murray to pursue the French with their swords, but were met near the city by a heavy fire from a floating battery covering the bridge over the St. Charles River as well as militia that remained in the trees. The 78th took the highest number of casualties of all British units in the battle. This was notably the last known successful Highland Charge in history.

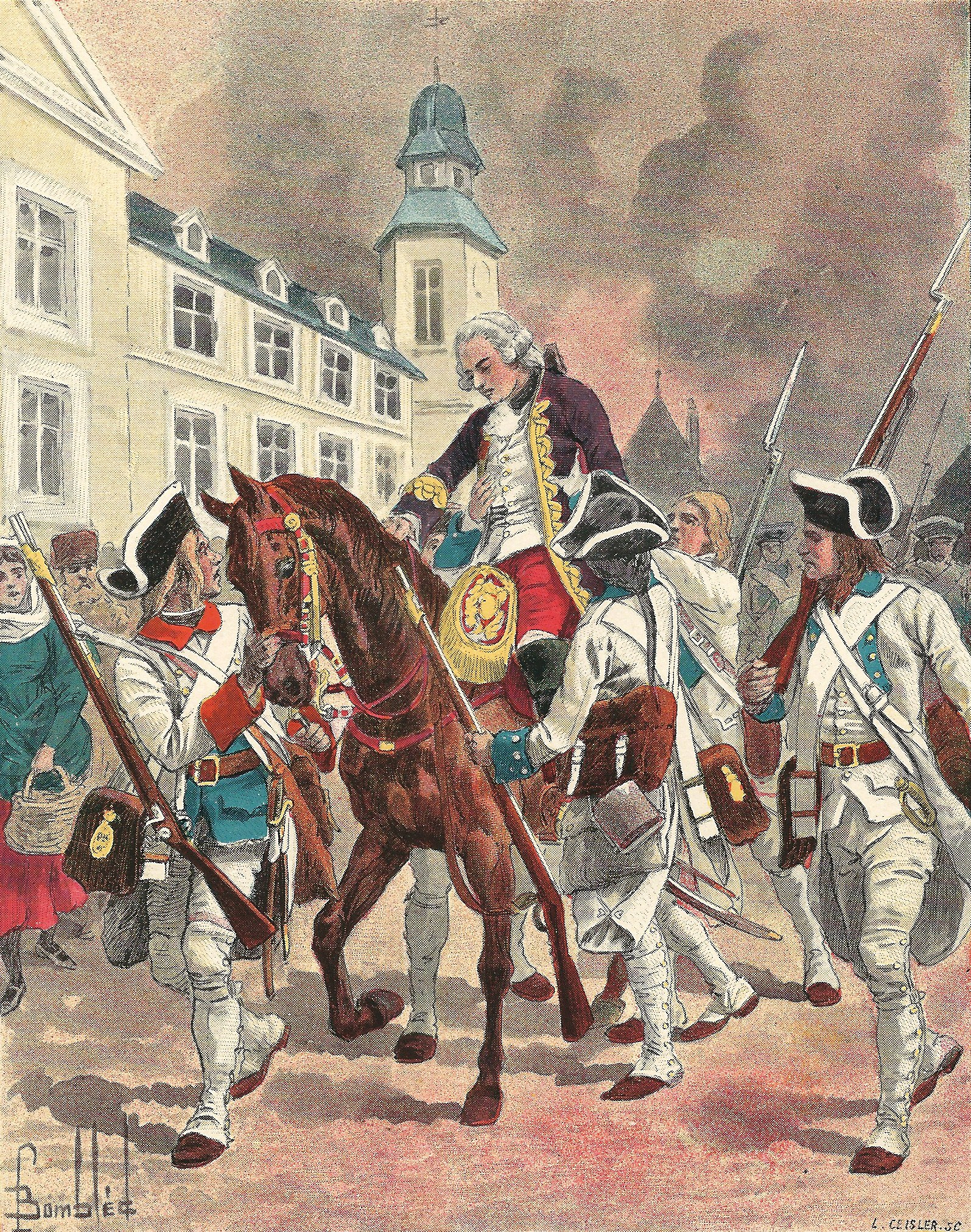
A mortally wounded Montcalm being taken to Quebec

An eyewitness with the 78th Highlanders (Dr Robert Macpherson) wrote three days after the battle:

The Highlanders pursued them to the very Sally Port of the town. The Highlanders returned towards the main body. When the highlanders were gathered together, they lay'd on a separate attack against a large body of Canadians on our flank that were posted in a small village and a Bush of woods. Here, after a wonderful escape all day, we suffered great loss both in Officers and men but at last drove them under the cover of their cannon which likeways did us considerable loss.

Townshend took charge of the British forces and realised that Bougainville's column was approaching from the British rear, having taken some time to arrive from Cap Rouge. He quickly formed up two battalions from the confused troops on the field and turned them to meet the oncoming French, a day-saving manoeuvre; instead of attacking with a well rested and ready force, Bougainville retreated while the rest of Montcalm's army slipped back across the St. Charles.

During the retreat, Montcalm, still mounted, was struck by either canister shot from the British artillery or repeated musket fire, suffering injuries to the lower abdomen and thigh. He was able to make it back into the city, but his wounds were mortal and he died at the wee hours the next morning. A few moments before he drew his last breath, Montcalm asked his surgeon how much time he had to live. "A few hours," he was answered. "All the better," he said, "I will not see the English in Quebec." He was buried in a crater left in the floor of the Ursuline chapel by a British shell. In terms of casualties the British suffered 658 killed or wounded, of these, 61 were killed and 597 were wounded. The French casualties were between 644 and 716 killed or wounded, among those thirteen officers, and a further 350 men were taken prisoner.

== Aftermath ==
In the wake of the battle, a state of confusion spread through the French troops. Governor de Vaudreuil, who later wrote to his government and put the full blame for the French rout on the deceased Montcalm, decided to abandon Quebec and the Beauport shore, ordering all of his forces to march west and eventually join up with Bougainville, leaving the garrison in Quebec under the command of Jean-Baptiste Nicolas Roch de Ramezay.

The Death of Montcalm by Marc Aurèle de Foy Suzor-Coté

Meanwhile, the British, first under the command of Townshend and later with Murray in charge, settled in to besiege the city in conjunction with Saunders' fleet. Within days, on 18 September, de Ramezay, Townshend and Saunders signed the Articles of Capitulation of Quebec and the city was turned over to British control. The remaining French forces positioned themselves on the Jacques-Cartier River west of the city. The British Navy was forced to leave the St. Lawrence shortly after the capture of Quebec, lest pack ice close the mouth of the river.

The next April, before the ice left the rivers, the Chevalier de Lévis, Montcalm's successor as French commander, marched his 7,000 troops to Quebec. James Murray, the British commander, had experienced a terrible winter, in which scurvy had reduced his garrison to only 4,000. On 28 April, Lévis' forces met and defeated the British at the Battle of Sainte-Foy, immediately west of the city (near the site of Université Laval today). This battle proved bloodier than that of the Plains of Abraham, with about 850 casualties on the French side and 1,100 on the British side. The French had defeated the British, but the British were able to withdraw within the walls of Quebec, to which the French laid siege. A lack of artillery and ammunition, combined with British improvements to the fortifications, meant that the French were unable to take the city by storm. Both sides awaited reinforcements from Europe. The first ships to arrive, in mid-May, were part of a British fleet which had defeated Lévis' support ships. The success of the French army's offensive against Quebec in the spring of 1760 had depended on the dispatch of a French armada, with fresh troops and supplies. A naval battle fought at Quiberon Bay, just off the coast of France, proved the decisive battle for this part of New France. The Royal Navy destroyed the French fleet, meaning France could not send a reserve force to save New France.

At Montréal that September, Lévis and 2,000 troops were confronted with 17,000 British and American troops. The French capitulated on 8 September, and the British took possession of Montreal. The Treaty of Paris was signed in 1763 to end the war and gave possession of parts of New France to Great Britain, including Canada and the eastern half of French Louisiana—lying between the Mississippi River and the Appalachian Mountains.

== Legacy ==
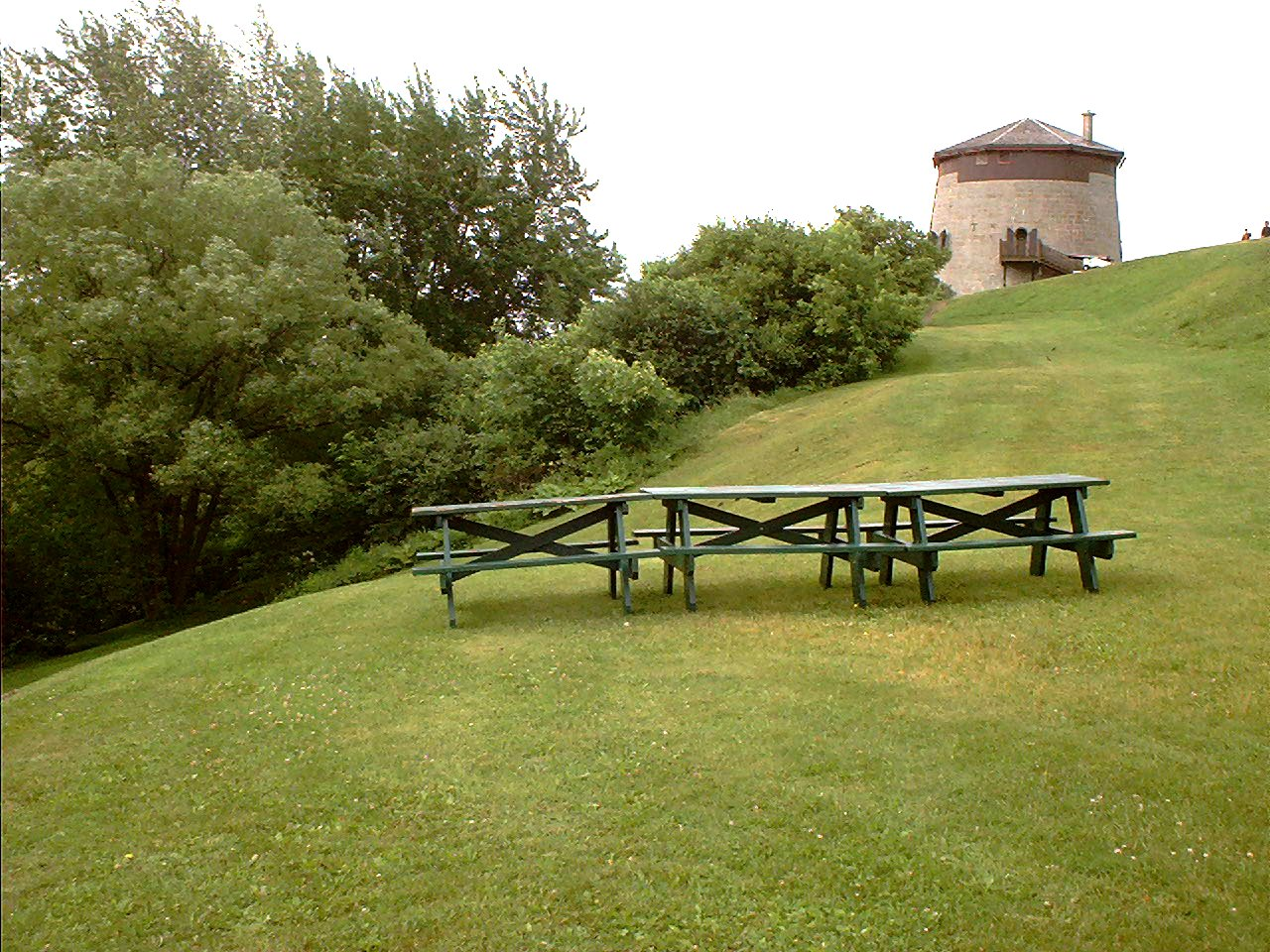
Martello Tower (constructed by the British 1808–1812) in The Battlefields Park, Quebec City

In 2009, a number of activities were proposed to commemorate the 250th anniversary of the Battle of the Plains of Abraham. A planned re-enactment of the battle itself (as well as a re-enactment of the subsequent French victory of 1760 at the Battle of Sainte-Foy) was cancelled in response to threats of public disorder. Leaders of separatist parties described the event as a slap in the face for Quebecers of French ancestry and as an insult for the francophone majority. Some sovereigntist groups threatened or made indirect threats by stating that if the event took place, there could be violence. The movement against re-enactment and these threats of violence led the National Battlefields Commission to cancel the event.

Another commemorative event was proposed for the anniversary, the Moulin à paroles. Thousands gathered on the Plains of Abraham to listen to recitations of 140 significant texts from Quebec history, including the 1970 FLQ Manifesto. The inclusion of that document in the event led to condemnations and a boycott from federalist politicians and the withdrawal of some government funding for the event. The Moulin à paroles took place without incident.

In 2017, during construction within the Old City of Quebec, a cannonball was found which is believed to have been fired during the siege.

According to a myth, Wolfe sang the soldier song "How Stands the Glass Around" the night before the battle, giving the song its alternate name "General Wolfe's Song". In his work Montcalm and Wolfe, Francis Parkman states that the evening before the battle, Wolfe recited Thomas Gray's "Elegy Written in a Country Churchyard", which includes the line "the paths of glory lead but to the grave."

== See also ==
- Conquest of Canada
- Great Britain in the Seven Years' War
- Wolfe–Montcalm Monument

== Bibliography ==
- Anderson, Fred (2000), Crucible of War: The Seven Years' War and the Fate of Empire in British North America, 1754–1766, New York: Alfred A. Knopf, ISBN 0-375-40642-5, archived from the original on 15 August 2021
- Brumwell, Stephen (2006), Paths of Glory: The Life and Death of General James Wolfe, New York: Carnegie Publishing Ltd, Lancaster, ISBN 1-8528-5553-3, archived from the original on 7 April 2022
- Casgrain, H. R. (1905), Wolfe And Montcalm, The Makers of Canada, Toronto: Morang & Co
- Chartrand, Rene (1999), Quebec 1759, Oxford: Osprey Publishing, ISBN 1-85532-847-X
- Eccles, W. J. (1969), The Canadian Frontier, 1534–1760, New York: Holt, Rinehart and Winston, ISBN 0-03-076540-4, archived from the original on 27 March 2022
- Eccles, W. J. (1972), France in America, New York: Harper & Row, ISBN 978-0-0601-1152-6
- Francis, R. Douglas; Jones, Richard & Smith, Donald B. (2000), Origins: Canadian History to Confederation, Toronto: Harcourt Canada, ISBN 0-7747-3664-X
- Hayes, Derek (2002), Historical Atlas of Canada, Vancouver: Douglas & McIntyre, ISBN 1-55054-918-9
- Hibbert, Christopher (1959), Wolfe At Quebec, New York: The World Publishing Company
- Lloyd, Christopher (1959), The Capture of Quebec, London: B.T. Batsford
- MacLeod, D. Peter (2008), Northern Armageddon: The Battle of the Plains of Abraham, Vancouver: Douglas & MacIntrye, ISBN 978-1-55365-412-4
- Reid, Stuart (2003), Quebec 1759: The Battle That Won Canada, Oxford: Osprey Publishing, ISBN 1-85532-605-1
- Snow, Dan (2009). Death or Victory: The Battle for Quebec and the Birth of Empire. Harper Collins UK. ISBN 978-0-00-728620-1.
