= Roddickton-Bide Arm =

- Town
- Motto: Moose Capital of the World
- Location of Roddickton-Bide Arm in Newfoundland
- Coordinates: 50°51′N 56°07′W
- Country: Canada
- Province: Newfoundland and Labrador
- Incorporated: January 1, 2009

Government
  - Mayor: Kenneth Reid
  - MP: Carol Anstey

Area (2011)
  - Total: 47.71 km^{2} (18.42 sq mi)

Population (2021)
  - Total: 928
  - Density: 22.2/km^{2} (57/sq mi)
- Time zone: UTC-3:30 (Newfoundland Time)
  - Summer (DST): UTC-2:30 (Newfoundland Daylight)
- Area code: 709
- Highways: Route 433; Route 434
- Website: Town of Roddickton-Bide Arm

Roddickton-Bide Arm is a town located in the northern peninsula of the island of Newfoundland within the province of Newfoundland and Labrador. It was formed on January 1, 2009 through the amalgamation of the former towns of Roddickton and Bide Arm.

== Demographics ==
In the 2021 Census of Population conducted by Statistics Canada, Roddickton-Bide Arm had a population of 928 living in 377 of its 422 total private dwellings, a change of −7.1% from its 2016 population of 999. With a land area of 45.14 km^{2} (17.43 sq mi), it had a population density of 20.6/km^{2} (53.2/sq mi) in 2021.

== See also ==
- List of communities in Newfoundland and Labrador
- Bide Arm, former town
- Roddickton, former town
- Newfoundland and Labrador Route 432
