= Fischot Island =

Island and former island community in Newfoundland and Labrador, Canada

Coordinates: 51.183055°N 55.683438°W

Fischot Island is an island and a former island community in Newfoundland and Labrador, Canada. It is part of the Fischot Islands, that lay just east of the Great Northern Peninsula, to the south of the town of St. Anthony.

The village of Fischot Island had a population of 48 in 1935. The inhabitants of the 1.3 km (0.81 mi) round island, all resettled to new towns in search of work and better opportunities for raising their families. There were four main families that lived on the island. They were Alyward, Bromley, Davis, and Sexton. Most of these families originally came from England and Ireland. The island has been vacant for over 40 years now.

The entrance way to Fischot Island is very narrow with shallow water due to many islands in the surrounding area, making it possible for only small boats to enter and lay anchor.

== History ==
In Phantom Islands of the Atlantic, author Donald Johnson suggests that the legendary "Isle of Demons" – according to one account, inhabited by a beast as "big as an ox, with two teeth in its mouth like an elephant, who lives in the sea" – may correspond to present-day Fischot Island.

Fischot Island was used mainly by the French to come and dock during the fishing seasons. During King George's War, the British attacked the village in the Newfoundland Campaign (1744). The French people have been fishing there for centuries.

In the early 19th century Henry Bromley came to the island. He watched over the property while the French returned to France in the wintertime. He soon married and started a family. Then in the 1850s the island's population then started to grow, and with the increase in population the residents built churches and schools. Before long, Newfoundlanders and French were fishing and living all together on the island.

The permanent settlers to the island survived on an economy of fishing, mainly salmon, cod, capelin and herring. Winter activities included hunting and woodcutting on the shores of Hare Bay, especially as there was no timber on the island itself. Agriculture was limited to root crops and the small number of livestock raised. Even though the people of Fischot Island were very connected to the people in the surrounding communities, once Newfoundland joined Canada in 1949, they started to suffer from isolation, transportation difficulties, and a lack of essential services.

The population of the island kept increasing but this only accentuated the need for improved living conditions in the community. Between 1970 and 1972, resettlement, under the first Federal-Provincial resettlement agreement for the relocation of fishermen, took place from Fischot Island though one family of 4 remained until later, being recorded as 4 in the 1976 census.

== See also ==
- List of communities in Newfoundland and Labrador
