= Roddickton =

Roddickton Eastern Brook
- Town
- Seal

- Location of Roddickton in Newfoundland
- Coordinates: 50°51′N 56°07′W
- Country: Canada
- Province: Newfoundland and Labrador
- Incorporated: 1953

Population (2006)
  - Total: 911
- Time zone: UTC−03:30 (NST)
  - Summer (DST): UTC−02:30 (NDT)
- Area code: 709
- Highways: Route 433; Route 434

Roddickton is a community and former town located on the eastern side of the Great Northern Peninsula on the island of Newfoundland in the Canadian province of Newfoundland and Labrador. It amalgamated with the former Town of Bide Arm on January 1, 2009 to create the Town of Roddickton-Bide Arm.

Roddickton was originally named Eastern Brook and was used by residents of Englee, a small fishing community for salmon fishing, hunting and trapping. In 1906, the Grenfell Mission began a sawmill operation here and the name was changed to Roddickton in honour of Thomas George Roddick, a supporter of the mission. The first permanent settlers of the community were residents from Englee and Wild Cove who went there to work in the sawmill operation and to clear land for growing crops for the St. Anthony hospital. The first census was taken in 1911, and showed a population of 46, but the sawmill closed and by 1921 there were only 8 residents left and the community was abandoned the next year. Four years later, the sawmill was reopened and in the 1930s Bowater began pulpwood cutting in the area. By 1945, the population rose to 548.

Roddickton was incorporated as a town in 1953. In the 1960s, isolation ended with a road being built to the town and made it the region's service and supply centre. People from other small settlements in the area were resettled to Roddickton and in 1961 the population was 1185. In the 1970s, things began to decline. The pulpwood operations owned by Bowater closed, causing many to leave the area. In the 1980s, a crab plant was opened up to provide employment for the community, but in the late 1980s a fire destroyed it and the sawmill. By 1992, the sawmill was running again, the crab plant had been rebuilt, but was not operating.

Roddickton shortly after also combined with the neighbouring small town of “Bide Arm” creating the name “Roddickton-Bide Arm”. While these towns are still considered two different things by the residents, there’s no denying there’s still a connection between the people of Bide Arm and people of Roddickton.

== See also ==
- List of communities in Newfoundland and Labrador
- Bide Arm, former town
