= Newfoundland Campaign (1744) =

British military action against France during King George's War

The Newfoundland Campaign was conducted by the British against the seven French ports and fishing fleet off northern Newfoundland at the opening of King George's War. The British were led by Captain Robert Young of HMS Kinsale and Captain John Rous of Young Eagle (16 carriage, 24 swivel guns, 100 men).

== Historical Context ==
French colonists and their recruited militias had attacked British villages in Newfoundland in the fall of 1727.

== Campaign ==
In June 1744, Rous captured five prizes off Newfoundland and returned them to St. John's on June 29. In the first 12 days of July, Rous caught 9 more prizes on the Grand Banks. By the end of July, Rous arrived in port at Ferryland with seven more ships. Rous then arrived in St. John's again with another 12 prizes.

On August 18, Rous with three other vessels (one under the command of Capt. Robert Cleves) attacked 5 ships of the French fleet at Fishott (Fishroad). The conflict lasted 5.5 hours. The French killed 11 of the British crew and wounded over 30. Rous estimated the French casualties were double this number and 70 were taken prisoner. Rous then moved on to St. Julien's where there was strong resistance but Rous was able to capture 3 ships. He then attacked Carrous (also known as Carpoon and Quirpon Island).

== Afterward ==
The following year the Mi’kmaq militia from Ile-Royale raided various British outposts in Newfoundland in August 1745. They attacked several houses, taking 23 prisoners. The following spring the Mi’kmaq began to take 12 of the prisoners to a rendez-vous point close to St. John's, en route to Quebec. The prisoners managed to overpower and kill their captors at the rendez-vous site near St. John and escaped. Two days later, another group of Mi’kmaq took the remaining 11 prisoners to the same rendez-vous point. Discovering the fate of their fellow captors, the other Mi’kmaq killed the remaining 11 prisoners.
