= Plum Point, Newfoundland and Labrador =

Human settlement in Canada

Coordinates: 51°04′00″N 56°53′00″W

Plum Point is a local service district and designated place in the Canadian province of Newfoundland and Labrador. It is west of Anchor Point.

== History ==
The original name Ferrol Zaharra was given by the Basque fishermen and been translated in English later on. The former name of Old Ferrole was changed on June 11, 1965.

== Geography ==
Plum Point is in Newfoundland within Subdivision C of Division No. 9.

== Demographics ==
As a designated place in the 2016 Census of Population conducted by Statistics Canada, Plum Point recorded a population of 112 living in 52 of its 71 total private dwellings, a change of -12.5% from its 2011 population of 128. With a land area of 2.45 km^{2} (0.95 sq mi), it had a population density of 45.7/km^{2} (118.4/sq mi) in 2016.

== Government ==
Plum Point is a local service district (LSD) that is governed by a committee responsible for the provision of certain services to the community. The chair of the LSD committee is Ben Coombs.

== See also ==
- Great Northern Peninsula
- List of designated places in Newfoundland and Labrador
- List of local service districts in Newfoundland and Labrador
- Newfoundland and Labrador Route 432
