= Englee =

- Town
- Seal

- Location of Englee in Newfoundland
- Coordinates: 50°44′07″N 56°06′09″W
- Country: Canada
- Province: Newfoundland and Labrador
- Settled: circa 1870
- Incorporated: 1948

Population (2021)
  - Total: 489
- Time zone: UTC−03:30 (NST)
  - Summer (DST): UTC−02:30 (NDT)
- Area code: 709
- Highways: Route 433

Englee is a small fishing community on the east side of the Great Northern Peninsula in a sheltered harbour on the northern headland of Canada Bay, on the island of Newfoundland in the Canadian province of Newfoundland and Labrador.

== Demographics ==
In the 2021 census of population conducted by Statistics Canada, Englee had a population of 489 living in 215 of its 257 total private dwellings, a change of −7.2% from its 2016 population of 527. With a land area of 28.82 km^{2} (11.13 sq mi), it had a population density of 17.0/km^{2} (43.9/sq mi) in 2021.

== See also ==
- List of cities and towns in Newfoundland and Labrador
- List of people from Newfoundland and Labrador
