= Main Brook =

- Town
- Location of Main Brook in Newfoundland
- Coordinates: 51°09′55″N 55°59′15″W
- Country: Canada
- Province: Newfoundland and Labrador

Population (2021)
  - Total: 246
- Time zone: UTC−03:30 (NST)
  - Summer (DST): UTC−02:30 (NDT)
- Area code: 709
- Highways: Route 432

Main Brook is a town in the Canadian province of Newfoundland and Labrador. The town had a population of 246 in the Canada 2021 Census.

== Demographics ==
In the 2021 Census of Population conducted by Statistics Canada, Main Brook had a population of 246 living in 118 of its 180 total private dwellings, a change of 1.2% from its 2016 population of 243. With a land area of 28 km^{2} (11 sq mi), it had a population density of 8.8/km^{2} (22.8/sq mi) in 2021.

== Climate ==
Climate data for Main Brook Climate ID:: 840KE88; coordinates 51°11′N 56°01′W; elevation: 14 m (46 ft); 1981-2010 normals
Month	Jan	Feb	Mar	Apr	May	Jun	Jul	Aug	Sep	Oct	Nov	Dec	Year
Record high °C (°F)	11.0 (51.8)	9.0 (48.2)	11.0 (51.8)	15.0 (59.0)	25.0 (77.0)	30.0 (86.0)	31.0 (87.8)	30.5 (86.9)	28.0 (82.4)	23.5 (74.3)	18.5 (65.3)	13.5 (56.3)	31.0 (87.8)
Mean daily maximum °C (°F)	−6.3 (20.7)	−6.0 (21.2)	−1.7 (28.9)	3.6 (38.5)	9.6 (49.3)	15.0 (59.0)	19.2 (66.6)	19.5 (67.1)	15.2 (59.4)	8.5 (47.3)	2.5 (36.5)	−2.6 (27.3)	6.4 (43.5)
Daily mean °C (°F)	−11.0 (12.2)	−11.0 (12.2)	−6.4 (20.5)	−0.3 (31.5)	5.1 (41.2)	10.0 (50.0)	14.2 (57.6)	14.7 (58.5)	10.7 (51.3)	5.0 (41.0)	−0.7 (30.7)	−6.4 (20.5)	2.0 (35.6)
Mean daily minimum °C (°F)	−15.7 (3.7)	−16.0 (3.2)	−11.1 (12.0)	−4.2 (24.4)	0.5 (32.9)	4.9 (40.8)	9.1 (48.4)	9.9 (49.8)	6.2 (43.2)	1.5 (34.7)	−3.8 (25.2)	−10.1 (13.8)	−2.4 (27.7)
Record low °C (°F)	−34.0 (−29.2)	−35.0 (−31.0)	−34.0 (−29.2)	−22.0 (−7.6)	−10.0 (14.0)	−2.0 (28.4)	0.0 (32.0)	1.0 (33.8)	−3.0 (26.6)	−9.0 (15.8)	−22.5 (−8.5)	−31.0 (−23.8)	−35.0 (−31.0)
Average precipitation mm (inches)	129.8 (5.11)	137.8 (5.43)	88.4 (3.48)	69.9 (2.75)	73.6 (2.90)	99.0 (3.90)	108.8 (4.28)	100.1 (3.94)	89.6 (3.53)	105.8 (4.17)	92.1 (3.63)	129.0 (5.08)	1,223.9 (48.2)
Average rainfall mm (inches)	9.5 (0.37)	12.7 (0.50)	15.2 (0.60)	33.6 (1.32)	60.8 (2.39)	97.9 (3.85)	108.8 (4.28)	100.1 (3.94)	89.6 (3.53)	102.9 (4.05)	52.5 (2.07)	25.3 (1.00)	708.8 (27.91)
Average snowfall cm (inches)	120.2 (47.3)	125.1 (49.3)	73.2 (28.8)	36.3 (14.3)	12.8 (5.0)	1.1 (0.4)	0.0 (0.0)	0.0 (0.0)	0.0 (0.0)	2.9 (1.1)	39.7 (15.6)	103.8 (40.9)	515.0 (202.8)
Average precipitation days (≥ 0.2 mm)	12.3	10.9	9.5	8.5	10.7	11.9	13.4	11.9	11.7	14.7	12.1	13.0	140.5
Average rainy days (≥ 0.2 mm)	1.5	1.3	2.1	4.6	9.5	11.9	13.4	11.9	11.7	14.4	7.7	3.3	93.2
Average snowy days (≥ 0.2 cm)	11.1	9.9	7.6	4.5	1.2	0.14	0.0	0.0	0.0	0.67	5.1	10.4	50.7
Source: Environment and Climate Change Canada

== See also ==
- List of cities and towns in Newfoundland and Labrador
