= Bide Arm =

- Former town
- Location of Bide Arm in Newfoundland
- Coordinates: 50°48′49.48″N 56°06′08.13″W
- Country: Canada
- Province: Newfoundland and Labrador

Population (2006)
  - Total: 192
- Time zone: UTC-3:30 (Newfoundland Time)
  - Summer (DST): UTC-2:30 (Newfoundland Daylight)
- Area code: 709
- Highways: Route 433

Bide Arm is a community located on the Great Northern Peninsula in the Canadian province of Newfoundland and Labrador. It amalgamated with the former Town of Roddickton on January 1, 2009, to create the Town of Roddickton-Bide Arm. Bide Arm had a population of 192 in the Canada 2006 Census.

== See also ==
- List of municipalities in Newfoundland and Labrador
- Roddickton, former town
