= Newfoundland and Labrador Route 437 =

Highway in Newfoundland and Labrador, Canada

Route 437
- Cape Onion Road

Route information
- Maintained by Newfoundland and Labrador Department of Transportation and Infrastructure
- Length: 22.1 km (13.7 mi)

Major junctions
- South end: Route 436 near St. Anthony
- North end: Cape Onion-Ship Cove

Location
- Country: Canada
- Province: Newfoundland and Labrador

Highway system
- Highways in Newfoundland and Labrador
← Route 436	→ Route 438

Route 437, also known as Cape Onion Road, is a 22.1-kilometre-long (13.7 mi) north-south highway on the northern edge of the Great Northern Peninsula of Newfoundland in the Canadian province of Newfoundland and Labrador. It connects the communities of Cape Onion-Ship Cove and Raleigh, along with Pistolet Bay Provincial Park, with Route 436 (L'Anse aux Meadows Road) and St. Anthony.

== Route description ==
Route 437 begins at an intersection with Route 436 a few kilometres northwest of St. Anthony. It immediately winds its way northwest along the coastline through rural areas for several kilometres to pass through Pistolet Bay Provincial Park. The highway now arrives at Raleigh, where it makes a sharp right turn at an intersection with Raleigh Spur Road, which provides access to downtown and the Burnt Cape Ecological Reserve. Route 437 now heads northeast along the coastline for several kilometres before entering Cape Onion-Ship Cove, where Route 437 ends at a fork in the road between two local roads, with one leading to Cape Onion and the other leading to Ship Cove.

== Major intersections ==
Location	km	mi	Destinations	Notes
	0.0	0.0	Route 436 (L'Anse aux Meadows Road) – St. Anthony, St. Lunaire-Griquet, L'Anse aux Meadows	Southern terminus
	9.1	5.7	Pistolet Bay Provincial Park main entrance	Access road into park
Raleigh	13.2	8.2	Raleigh Spur Road (Route 437-10) - Downtown, Burnt Cape Ecological Reserve	
Cape Onion-Ship Cove	22.1	13.7	Cape Onion Road - Cape Onion Sam Hurley's Road - Ship Cove	Fork in the road; northern terminus
1.000 mi = 1.609 km; 1.000 km = 0.621 mi
