= Newfoundland and Labrador Route 435 =

Highway in Newfoundland and Labrador, Canada

Route 435

Route information
- Maintained by Newfoundland and Labrador Department of Transportation and Infrastructure
- Length: 33.9 km (21.1 mi)

Major junctions
- South end: Route 430 near St. Anthony
- North end: North Boat Harbour

Location
- Country: Canada
- Province: Newfoundland and Labrador

Highway system
- Highways in Newfoundland and Labrador
← Route 434	→ Route 436

Route 435 is a 33.9-kilometre-long (21.1 mi) north–south highway on the Great Northern Peninsula of Newfoundland in the Canadian province of Newfoundland and Labrador. It connects the communities on the northwestern tip of the peninsula (Cape Norman) with Route 430 (Viking Trail/Great Northern Peninsula Highway) and St. Anthony.

== Route description ==
Route 435 begins at an intersection with Route 430 several kilometres northwest of St. Anthony and the road winds its way northwest along the coastline for several kilometres, where it passes by an abandoned airport and has an intersection with a local road leading to Big Brook and Eddies Cove. The highway continues northward to Cook's Harbour, where it makes a sharp left turn at an intersection with Main Street. Route 435 now winds its way west, passing through Wild Bight and having an intersection with a local road leading to the community of Cape Norman and the Cape Norman Lighthouse. It now turns to the south for a few kilometres to travel along the beach before arriving at North Boat Harbour, where Route 435 comes to a dead end.

== Major intersections ==
Location	km	mi	Destinations	Notes
	0.0	0.0	Route 430 (Great Northern Peninsula Highway/Viking Trail) to Route 1 (TCH) – Deer Lake, Port au Choix, L'Anse aux Meadows, St. Anthony	Southern terminus; provides access to Labrador Ferry
	1.9– 3.1	1.2– 1.9	Abandoned Airport	
	15.1	9.4	Big Brook Road - Big Brook, Watt's Point Ecological Reserve	
Cook's Harbour	24.3	15.1	Main Street (Route 435-10) - Downtown	
	26.9	16.7	Cape Norman Road - Cape Norman, Cape Norman Lighthouse	
North Boat Harbour	33.9	21.1	Dead End	Northern terminus
1.000 mi = 1.609 km; 1.000 km = 0.621 mi
