= Newfoundland and Labrador Route 436 =

Highway in Newfoundland and Labrador, Canada

Route 436
- L'Anse aux Meadows Road

Route information
- Maintained by Newfoundland and Labrador Department of Transportation and Infrastructure
- Length: 29.1 km (18.1 mi)

Major junctions
- South end: Route 430 northwest of St. Anthony
- Route 437 northwest of St. Anthony
- North end: L'Anse aux Meadows National Historic Site

Location
- Country: Canada
- Province: Newfoundland and Labrador

Highway system
- Highways in Newfoundland and Labrador
← Route 435	→ Route 437

Route 436, also known as L'Anse aux Meadows Road, is a 29.1-kilometre-long (18.1 mi) north-south highway on the Great Northern Peninsula of Newfoundland in the Canadian province of Newfoundland and Labrador. Its southern terminus is an intersection on Route 430 (Viking Trail/Great Northern Peninsula Highway), and its northern terminus is at L'Anse aux Meadows, a world-famous archaeological site.

== Route description ==
Route 436 begins at an intersection with Route 430 (Great Northern Peninsula Highway/Viking Trail) just a few kilometres northwest of St. Anthony. It heads northeast through rural areas to cross a couple of brooks before having an intersection with Route 437 (Cape Onion Road). The highway now begins winding its way along the coastline as it passes through St. Lunaire-Griquet and Gunners Cove. Route 436 has an intersection with a local road leading to Quirpon before it passes through Noddy Bay and Straitsview (also known as Spillars Cove). The highway now meets a short local road to Hay Cove before entering L'Anse aux Meadows, where it meets a road leading to the visitor center before coming to an end at an intersection with Norstead Road.

== Attractions along Route 436 ==
- L'Anse aux Meadows National Historic Site

== Major intersections ==
Location	km	mi	Destinations	Notes
	0.0	0.0	Route 430 (Great Northern Peninsula Highway/Viking Trail) to Route 1 (TCH) – St. Anthony, Rocky Harbour, Deer Lake	Southern terminus
	3.6	2.2	Route 437 north (Cape Onion Road) – Raleigh, Cape Onion	Southern terminus of Route 437; provides access to Pistolet Bay Provincial Park
Noddy Bay	23.7	14.7	Quirpon Road (Route 436-11) - Quirpon	
Hay Cove	27.8	17.3	Hay Cove Road - Hay Cove	
L'Anse aux Meadows	29.1	18.1	Norstead Road	Northern terminus
1.000 mi = 1.609 km; 1.000 km = 0.621 mi
