= 1890 Atlantic hurricane season =

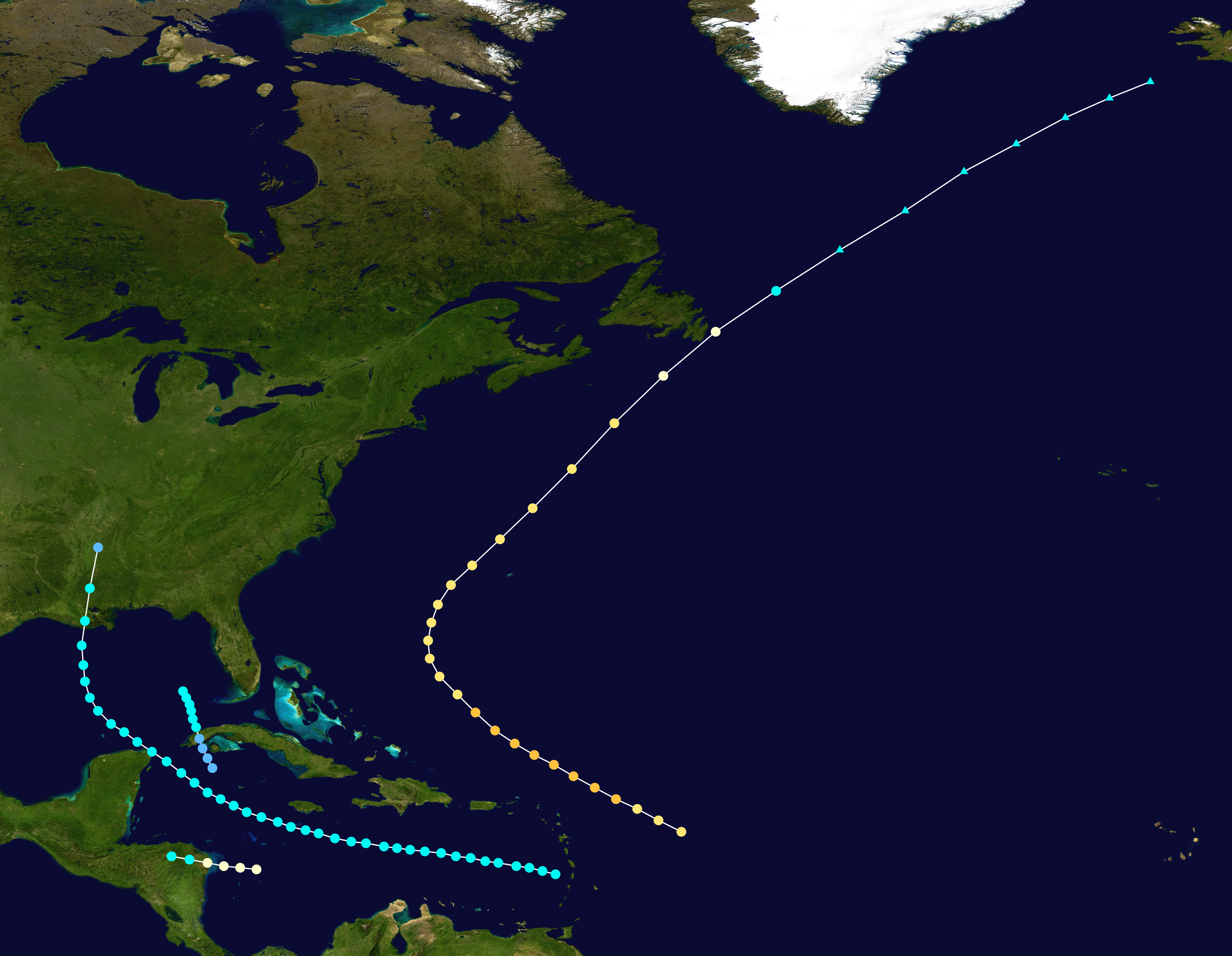
- Season summary map

Seasonal boundaries
- First system formed: May 27, 1890
- Last system dissipated: November 1, 1890

Strongest storm
- Name: Three
  - Maximum winds: 120 mph (195 km/h) (1-minute sustained)
  - Lowest pressure: 965 mbar (hPa; 28.5 inHg)

Seasonal statistics
- Total storms: 4
- Hurricanes: 2
- Major hurricanes (Cat. 3+): 1
- Total fatalities: At least 14
- Total damage: $1 million (1890 USD)

Related article
- 1890s North Indian Ocean cyclone seasons

The 1890 Atlantic hurricane season was among the least active Atlantic hurricane seasons on record. The first tropical cyclone of the season was initially observed on May 27 and the last storm, Hurricane Four, dissipated over Central America on November 1. These dates fall within the period with the most tropical cyclone activity in the Atlantic. The first storm moved slowly north-northwestward, bringing heavy rains and extensive flooding to Cuba, which caused at least three fatalities and at least $1 million (1890 USD) in damage. It dissipated in the Gulf of Mexico on May 29. Tropical cyclogenesis went dormant for nearly two and a half months, until another system was observed near the Windward Islands on August 18. It traversed the Caribbean Sea and Gulf of Mexico, grazing the Yucatan Peninsula and making landfall in Louisiana before dissipating on August 28. Impact from the storm was minimal.

Of the season's four tropical cyclones, two reached hurricane status. One of these two strengthened into a major hurricane, which are Category 3 or higher on the modern-day Saffir–Simpson hurricane wind scale. The strongest cyclone of the season, the third hurricane, peaked at Category 3 strength, with maximum sustained winds of 120 mph (195 km/h). Rough seas produced by this storm sunk a ship in the vicinity of the Lesser Antilles, drowning 10 people. The final tropical cyclone was first observed in the southwestern Caribbean Sea on October 31. Peaking as a strong Category 1 hurricane, it headed westward and made landfall in Nicaragua, before being last noted over Central America on November 1. The storm produced only minor damage in Nicaragua. Collectively, the tropical cyclones of this season resulted in at least $1 million in damage and 14 confirmed fatalities.

== Systems ==
=== Tropical Storm One ===
- Tropical storm (SSHWS)
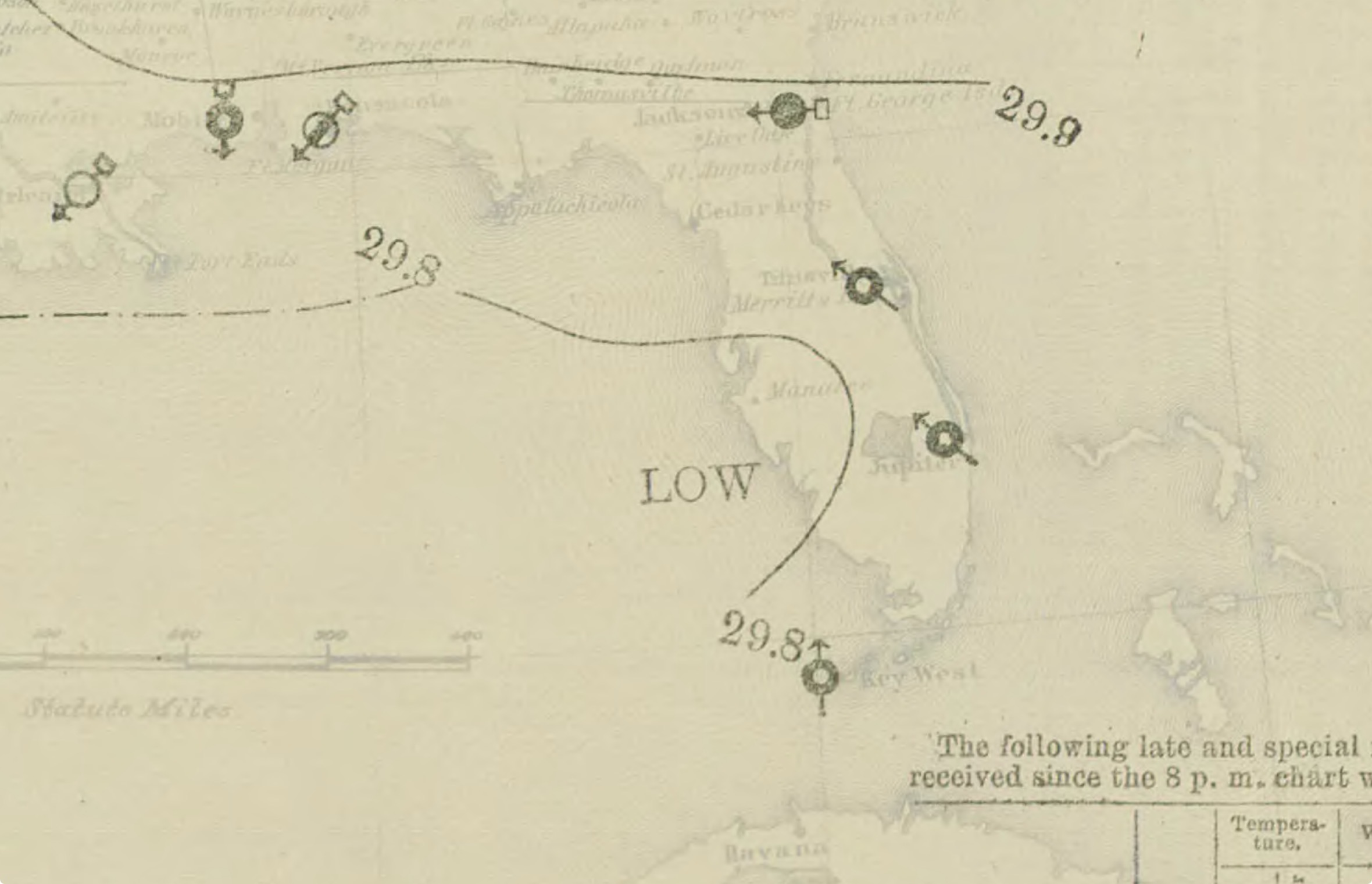
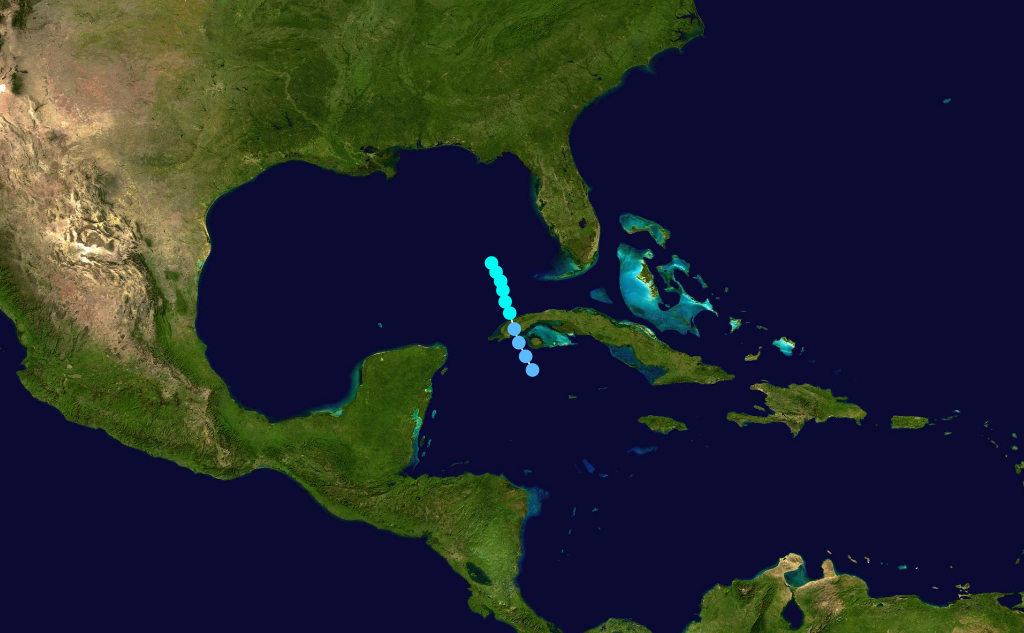
- Duration: May 27 – May 29
- Peak intensity: 60 mph (95 km/h) (1-min);

According to HURDAT – North Atlantic hurricane database – a tropical depression developed on May 27, while located about 65 miles (105 km) south of Isla de la Juventud, Cuba. The depression moved north-northwestward and did not strengthen before making landfall near Pinar del Río, Cuba, early the following day. It crossed Cuba without weakening and emerged into the southeastern Gulf of Mexico on May 28. Later that day, the depression intensified into a tropical storm. The cyclone continued to strengthen and peaked with winds of 60 mph (95 km/h) early on May 29. It was last noted about 125 miles (200 km) west-northwest of Dry Tortugas, Florida at around 1800 UTC.

The storm brought heavy rains to Cuba, with 13.58 inches (345 mm) observed in Havana in a 36-hour period. Flooding and mudslides caused extensive damage to several cities, including Calabazar, Chorrera, Havana, Puentes Grandes, San Antonio de los Baños, and Rincon. Several people had to be rescued. Nearly all telegraphic and railroad services were interrupted by flooding. With damage estimates in the millions of dollars, the event was described as "the most disastrous rains that had ever visited Cuba." At least four fatalities were confirmed after a ship capsized, while a "good number" of other persons drowned.

=== Tropical Storm Two ===
- Tropical storm (SSHWS)
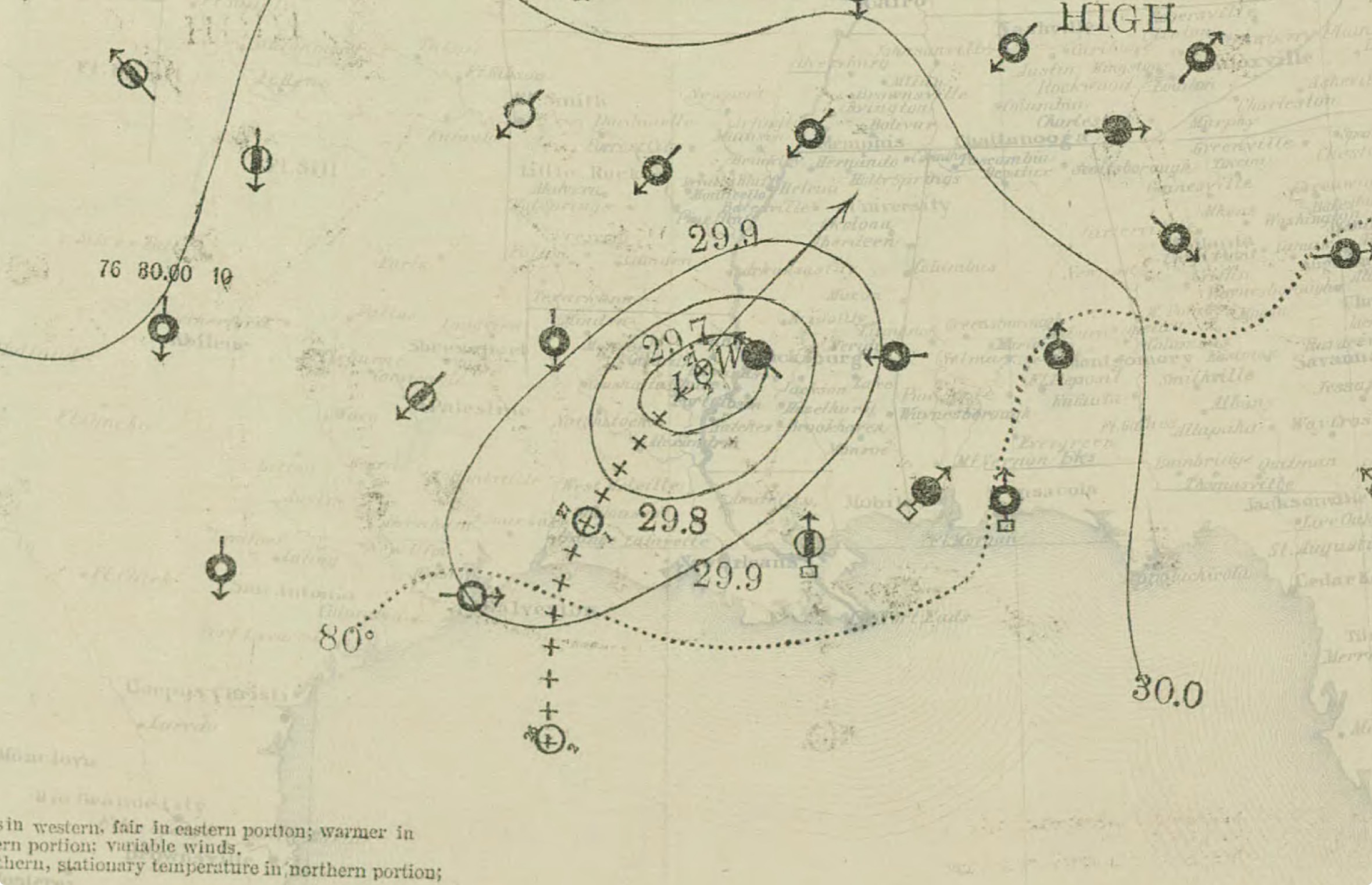
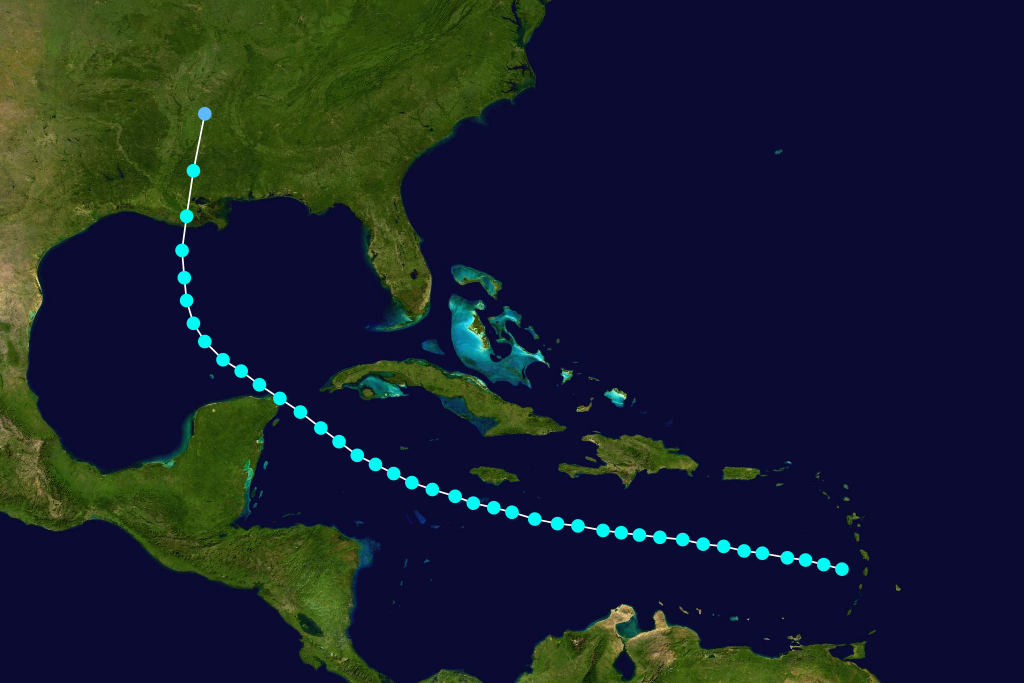
- Duration: August 18 – August 28
- Peak intensity: 60 mph (95 km/h) (1-min);

After no activity for over two months, the barque Aspatogan encountered "very heavy weather" associated with a tropical storm in the eastern Caribbean Sea on August 18. The system moved west-northwestward across the Caribbean Sea and strengthened slowly. Early on August 24, the storm attained its maximum sustained winds of 60 mph (95 km/h), while situated about 80 miles (130 km) south-southwest of Grand Cayman. Re-curving northwestward, it brushed the Yucatan Peninsula on August 25, shortly before entering the Gulf of Mexico. The storm again re-curved northward while located in the central Gulf of Mexico. At 1600 UTC, it made landfall near Dulac, Louisiana with winds of 60 mph (95 km/h). The system quickly weakened to a tropical depression and dissipated over northern Mississippi on August 28.

=== Hurricane Three ===
- Category 3 hurricane (SSHWS)
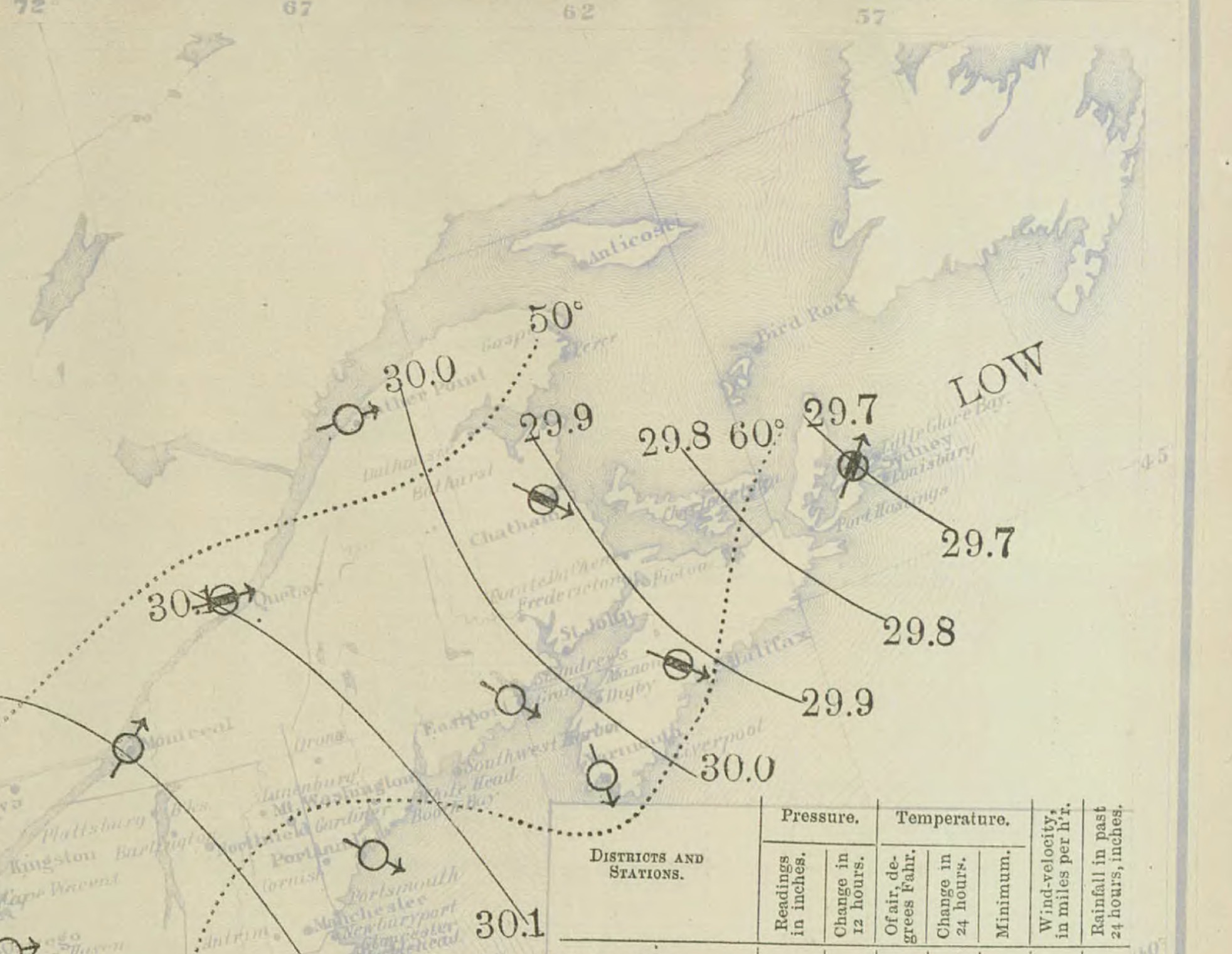
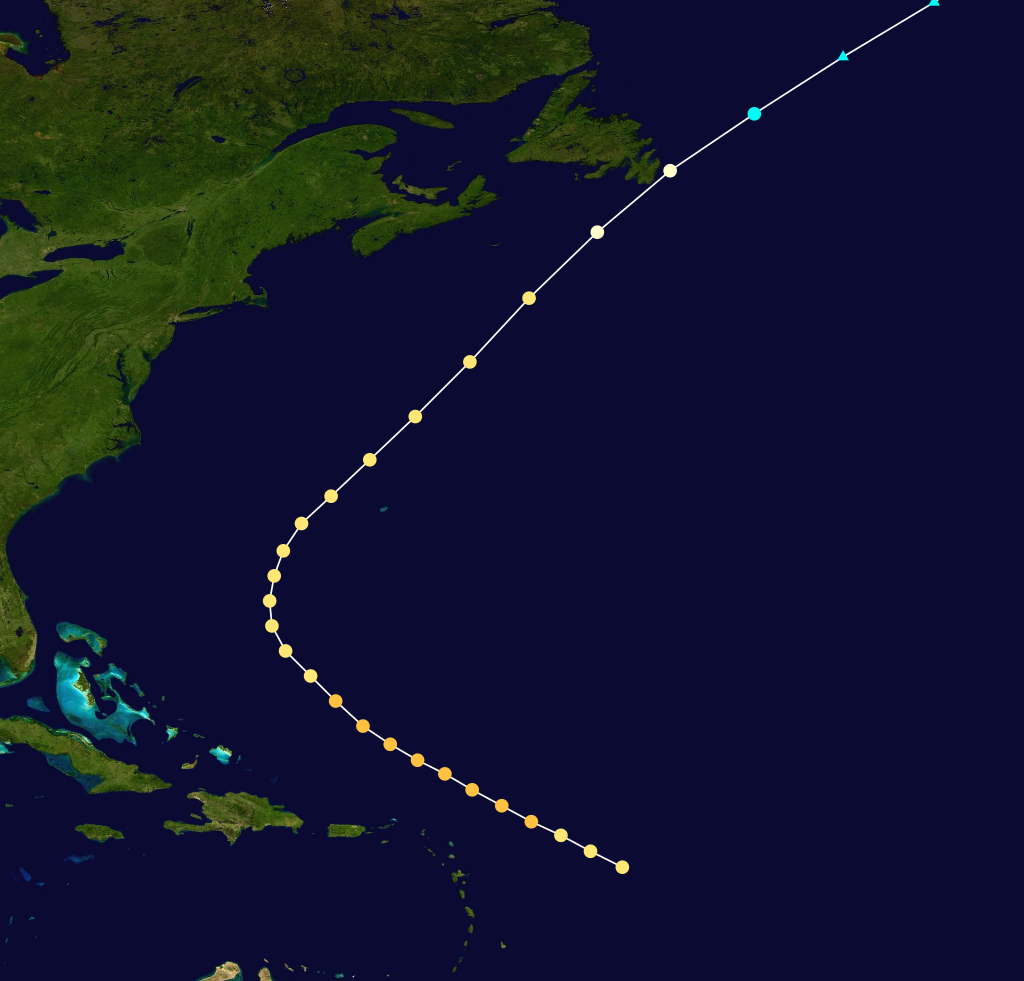
- Duration: August 26 – September 1
- Peak intensity: 120 mph (195 km/h) (1-min); ≤965 mbar (hPa)

The steamship Haytian encountered a storm equivalent in intensity to a Category 2 hurricane on the Saffir–Simpson hurricane wind scale, while located about 470 miles (760 km) east-northeast of Dominica on August 26. The cyclone headed northwestward and strengthened into a Category 3 hurricane early on the following day, becoming the only major hurricane of the season. Later on August 27, the storm attained its maximum sustained wind speed of 120 mph (195 km/h). The ship Portuense recorded a minimum barometric pressure of 965 mbar (28.5 inHg) at 0700 UTC on August 28. However, the ship sunk in the rough seas later that day while situated about 250 miles (400 km) northeast of Anegada, British Virgin Islands, drowning ten people, including the ship's captain and nine crew members.

After peak intensity, the storm began to weaken and fell to Category 2 strength on August 29. Later that day, the hurricane began re-curving northward and then accelerated northeastward on August 30. Although the storm passed well offshore the East Coast of the United States, rough seas caused "great damage" at beaches in New Jersey. While approaching Newfoundland on September 1, the system weakened to a Category 1 hurricane. Late on September 1, it weakened to a tropical storm, shortly before becoming extratropical about 465 miles (750 km) east-northeast of St. Lunaire-Griquet, Newfoundland and Labrador.

=== Hurricane Four ===
- Category 1 hurricane (SSHWS)
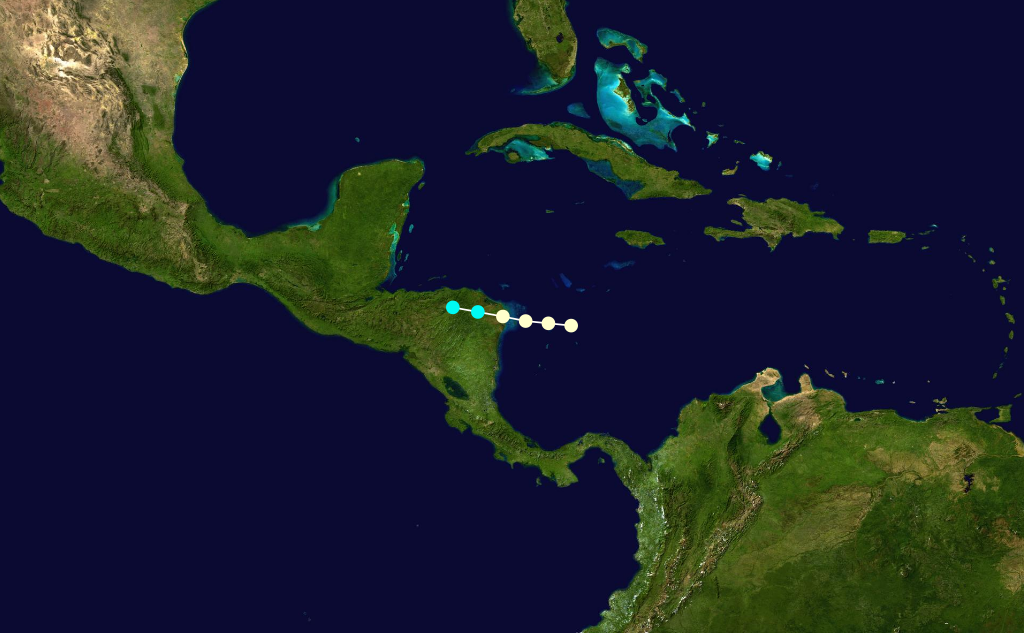
- Duration: October 31 – November 1
- Peak intensity: 90 mph (150 km/h) (1-min);

The steamship Gussie first encountered a hurricane with winds of 90 mph (150 km/h) early on October 31, while located about 95 miles (153 km) northeast of Providencia Island, Colombia. The cyclone tracked westward and maintained its intensity as a strong Category 1 hurricane. Late on October 31, it made landfall in Nicaragua just south of Cabo Gracias a Dios. At 0000 UTC on November 1, the system weakened to a tropical storm. Six hours later, it was last noted over the Olancho Department of Honduras. Impact from this system in Central America is unknown. Climate researcher Michael Chenoweth proposed the removal of this storm from HURDAT, uncovering "No evidence in land-based reports or from ships".

== See also ==
- Atlantic hurricane reanalysis project
- Tropical cyclone observation
