= List of shipwrecks in August 1877 =

The list of shipwrecks in August 1877 includes ships sunk, foundered, grounded, or otherwise lost during August 1877.

== 1 August ==
List of shipwrecks: 1 August 1877
Ship	State	Description
Crawford	United Kingdom	The ship was driven ashore at the mouth of the River Tyne. She was on a voyage form Quebec City, Canada to the River Tyne.
Croft	United Kingdom	The steamship was driven ashore on Amager, Denmark. She was refloated and taken in to Copenhagen, Denmark.
Erimus	United Kingdom	The steamship ran aground at Saint-Valery-sur-Somme, Somme, France and was damaged.
Guaycuru	Chile	The steamship was driven ashore at Constitución.
Rosario	United Kingdom	The steamship was wrecked on Ouessant, Finistère, France. All on board were rescued. She was on a voyage from Oran, Algeria to London.
Oder	Germany	The steamship caught fire at New York, United States and was severely damaged.

== 2 August ==
List of shipwrecks: 2 August 1877
Ship	State	Description
Comus	United Kingdom	The ship was sighted whilst on a voyage from Troon, Ayrshire to Demerara, British Guiana. No further trace, presumed foundered with the loss of all hands.
Genitore e Figli	Italy	The brig sprang a leak and foundered off St. Catherine's Point, Isle of Wight, United Kingdom. Her crew were rescued by the cutter Ranger (United Kingdom). Genitore e Figli was on a voyage from Marianople, Russia to Antwerp, Belgium.
Grace A. Channon	United States	The schooner was run into by the steam barge Champion (United States) and sank with the loss of one of the four people on board.
Halton	United Kingdom	The schooner foundered 2.5 nautical miles (4.6 km) south south west of The Lizard, Cornwall. Her three crew were rescued by Maiden Bower (United Kingdom). Halton was on a voyage from Rouen, Seine-Inférieure, France to Gloucester.
Island	Norway	The barque was driven ashore at "Segerstad", Öland, Sweden. She was on a voyage from Pori, Grand Duchy of Finland to Amsterdam, North Holland, Netherlands. She was refloated and resumed her voyage.
Zulu	United Kingdom	The steamship was driven ashore and wrecked at Peniche, Portugal. All on board were rescued. She was on a voyage from Cardiff, Glamorgan to Bombay, India.

== 3 August ==
List of shipwrecks: 3 August 1877
Ship	State	Description
Charger	United Kingdom	The ship ran aground at Belfast, County Antrim. She was on a voyage from Quebec City, Canada to Belfast. She was refloated.
Jane	United Kingdom	The schooner foundered off the north coast of Cornwall. Her crew were rescued. She was on a voyage from Cardiff, Glamorgan to Brading, Isle of Wight.
Lewis M. Lamb	United States	The ship ran aground at Silloth, Cumberland, United Kingdom. She was refloated.
Quiver	New Zealand	The 20-ton ketch was struck amidships by the steamer Taranaki (New Zealand) off Banks Peninsula, New Zealand and sank. Both crew were rescued by the Taranaki.

== 5 August ==
List of shipwrecks: 5 August 1877
Ship	State	Description
Ariadne	United Kingdom	The ship departed from Calcutta, India for Hull, Yorkshire. No further trace, reported missing.
Lillie Parsons	Canada	The schooner sank after hitting rocks in the Saint Lawrence Seaway.
R. and T. Freeman	Canada	The schooner was wrecked on Great Sand Cay.

== 6 August ==
List of shipwrecks: 6 August 1877
Ship	State	Description
Alpha	United Kingdom	The ship was driven ashore at Bridlington, Yorkshire. She was on a voyage from Hartlepool, County Durham to London.
Bencleugh	New Zealand	The 66-ton schooner parted her cables at Macquarie Island, Tasmania during a fierce storm. One crew member suffered a major fracture of the thigh from which he died.
Cheops	United Kingdom	The steamship was wrecked at Vingoria, India. She was on a voyage from Bombay to Carwar.
Elizabeth Crooks	United Kingdom	The ship was driven ashore at Baldoyle, County Dublin. She was on a voyage from Glasgow, Renfrewshire to Dublin.
Friesland	Netherlands	The steamship ran aground in the Nieuwe Waterweg. She was on a voyage from Rotterdam, South Holland to Java, Netherlands East Indies. She was refloated and resumed her voyage.
Rays of Light	United Kingdom	The barque was abandoned in the North Sea. Her crew were rescued. She subsequently foundered 7 nautical miles (13 km) south south west of Blåvandshuk, Denmark. She was on a voyage from Flores Island, Azores to Stettin, Germany.

== 7 August ==
List of shipwrecks: 7 August 1877
Ship	State	Description
Linnet	United Kingdom	The schooner struck rocks and sank at the Isle of May, Fife. Her six crew survived.
Lufra	Sweden	The steamship ran aground on the Stubbegrunden, in the Baltic Sea. She was on a voyage from Söderhamn to London, United Kingdom.
One	United Kingdom	The schooner was driven ashore at Margate, Kent.
Queen Bee	United Kingdom	The 726-ton barque ran aground on Farewell Spit, New Zealand with the loss of a crew member. Her passengers were rescued by the naval cutter HMS Aurora (Royal Navy) from one of the ship's two boats, while the crew — who had taken to the other, less stable boat — were picked up by the steamship Manawatu (New Zealand). Queen Bee was on a voyage from London to Nelson, New Zealand. She subsequently broke up.

== 8 August ==
List of shipwrecks: 8 August 1877
Ship	State	Description
Paul	Sweden	The brig was driven ashore at Ostly, Öland. She was on a voyage from London, United Kingdom to Nyland.

== 9 August ==
List of shipwrecks: 9 August 1877
Ship	State	Description
Betty	Sweden	The schooner was severely damaged in a storm in Wick Bay.
Braes o' Moray	United Kingdom	The ship was severely damaged in a storm in Wick Bay.
Marchmont	United Kingdom	The ship ran aground at Holyhead, Anglesey. She was later refloated and towed to Liverpool, Lancashire.
Splendide	France	The schooner was driven ashore at Tarifa, Spain, or at Gibraltar. Also reported to have foundered off Cape San Antonio, Spain with her crew being rescued by Balkaire (Flag unknown). Splendide was on a voyage from Rouen, Seine-Inférieure to Barcelona, Spain.

== 10 August ==
List of shipwrecks: 10 August 1877
Ship	State	Description
Amalia	Italy	The brig was abandoned off Cape St. Vincent, Portugal. Her crew were rescued by the brigantine Sanginel (Spain). Amalia was on a voyage from Crete to Rouen, Seine-Inférieure, France.
Fredrik Wilhelm	Germany	The brig collided with the steamship Douglas (United Kingdom) off Gävle, Sweden. Fredrik Wilhelm was on a voyage from Sundsvall, Sweden to Aberdeen, United Kingdom. She was consequently condemned.
Hygeia	United Kingdom	The barque departed from Alexandria, Egypt for Falmouth, Cornwall. No further trace, presumed foundered with the loss of all ten crew.
Slavomin	Austria-Hungary	The barque ran aground on the Corton Sands, in the North Sea off the coast of Suffolk, United Kingdom. She was on a voyage from Leith, Lothian, United Kingdom to Trieste. She was refloated with assistance and resumed her voyage.

== 11 August ==
List of shipwrecks: 11 August 1877
Ship	State	Description
Bewick	United Kingdom	The steamship was driven ashore on Amager, Denmark. She was refloated with assistance.
Cornhill	United Kingdom	The barque was damaged by fire at South Shields, County Durham.

== 12 August ==
List of shipwrecks: 12 August 1877
Ship	State	Description
County of Stirling	United Kingdom	The ship ran aground on the Futtah Sand, in the Hooghly River. She capsized and sank. She was on a voyage from Calcutta, India to Hull, Yorkshire.
Faith	United Kingdom	The schooner arrived at Dundee, Forfarshire from Lindisfarne, Northumberland on fire. The fire was extinguished.
Unnamed	United Kingdom	The pilot boat was run down and sunk in the Bristol Channel between Lundy Island and Morte Point, Devon by the steamship Pelaw (United Kingdom).

== 13 August ==
List of shipwrecks: 13 August 1877
Ship	State	Description
Robina Dunlop	New Zealand	The 493-ton barque ran ashore at the mouth of the Turakina River, New Zealand and was wrecked. All fourteen people on board survived. She was on a voyage from Wellington to Batavia, Netherlands East Indies.
Witch of the Wave	United Kingdom	The ship ran aground on a reef off Choiseul Island, Solomon Islands and was abandoned by her crew. She broke up on 21 August.
No. 9	Russia	The lighter collided with a tug and sank in the Neva.

== 14 August ==
List of shipwrecks: 14 August 1877
Ship	State	Description
Abal	France	The lugger was driven ashore at North Somercotes, Lincolnshire, United Kingdom. Her crew were rescued.
Charles	United Kingdom	The dumb barge was run into by the steamship Alethea (United Kingdom) and sank in the River Thames.
Europa	Germany	The barque was driven ashore 2 nautical miles (3.7 km) south of Seaham, County Durham, United Kingdom. Her crew were rescued.
Franklin	United Kingdom	The schooner was driven ashore at Ardglass, County Down. She was on a voyage from Whitehaven, Cumberland to Ardglass.
Isabella	United Kingdom	The schooner ran aground on the Pennington Spit, off the coast of Hampshire. She was on a voyage from London to Liverpool, Lancashire. She was refloated and resumed her voyage.
Providentia Arnt	Norway	The ship struck the pier at IJmuiden, South Holland, Netherlands and became waterlogged.
Queen of the Dart	United Kingdom	The schooner ran aground in the Douro. She was on a voyage from Porto, Portugal to London. She was refloated.
Robin Hood	United Kingdom	The trow was driven ashore and sank near "Kymin", Somerset. She was on a voyage from Bridgwater, Somerset to Cardiff, Glamorgan.
Stentor	United Kingdom	The steamship ran aground at Dragør, Denmark. She was on a voyage from Danzig, Germany to Antwerp, Belgium. She was refloated and resumed her voyage.
Wacousta	United Kingdom	The barque ran aground at the mouth of the Guadalhorce. She was on a voyage from Newcastle upon Tyne, Northumberland to Málaga, Spain. She was refloated and taken in to Málaga.

== 15 August ==
List of shipwrecks: 15 August 1877
Ship	State	Description
Azow	Norway	The barque was driven ashore 2 nautical miles (3.7 km) east of North Berwick, Lothian, United Kingdom. Her crew were rescued.
City of Havana	United Kingdom	The steamship ran aground on the Tuspan Reef. All on board were rescued. City of Havana was on a voyage from New Orleans, Louisiana, United States to Veracruz, Mexico, Havana, Cuba and New York, United States. She was abandoned as a total loss on 19 September.
Eugenia	Norway	The schooner was driven ashore 2 nautical miles (3.7 km) north of Fife Ness, Fife, United Kingdom. She was on a voyage from Drammen to Leith, Lothian.
Granton	United Kingdom	The lighter sprang a leak and sank at Leith.
Proven	Norway	The barque was driven ashore at "Elleborg", Zeeland, Netherlands. She was on a voyage from Söderhamn, Sweden to Antwerp, Belgium.
Waverley	United Kingdom	The steamship was driven ashore on Inchkeith, Fife. She was on a voyage from Rotterdam, South Holland, Netherlands to Leith. She was refloated and completed her voyage.

== 16 August ==
List of shipwrecks: 16 August 1877
Ship	State	Description
Amelia	United Kingdom	The steamship was driven ashore south of Peniche, Portugal. She was refloated.
Gem	United Kingdom	The sloop ran aground on the Krantzand, in the North Sea off the German coast. She was on a voyage from Fraserburgh, Aberdeenshire to Hamburg, Germany. She was refloated with assistance.
Hygeia	United Kingdom	The ship departed from Alexandria, Egypt for Falmouth, Cornwall. No further trace, presumed foundered with the loss of all nine crew.
N. K. Clements	United Kingdom	The barque was run down and sunk 70 nautical miles (130 km) east of Gibraltar by Sané (French Navy). Her crew were rescued by Sané. N. K. Clements was on a voyage from Torrevieja, Spain to Boston.
Patria	United Kingdom	The brig was driven ashore at Pula, Austria-Hungary. She was on a voyage from Swansea, Glamorgan to Pula. She was refloated with assistance from the steamship SMS Citon (Austro-Hungarian Navy) and taken in to Pula.
Uno	Sweden	The brigantine was driven ashore and wrecked on the Isla de Flores, Uruguay. She was on a voyage from Pernambuco, Brazil to Montevideo, Uruguay.

== 17 August ==
List of shipwrecks: 17 August 1877
Ship	State	Description
Belle	United States	The fishing schooner was wrecked on Duck Island near Portsmouth, New Hampshire. Her crew were rescued.
Gwendoline	United Kingdom	The steamship ran aground on the Queyriessand Bank, in the Gironde.
Marie	Norway	The barque was wrecked at Thisted, Denmark. Her crew were rescued. She was on a voyage from Dordrecht, South Holland, Netherlands to Dram.
Mecca	United Kingdom	The steamship was driven ashore in the Krishna River. She was on a voyage from Calcutta, India to Rangoon, Burma. She was refloated on 21 August and towed in to Rangoon.

== 18 August ==
List of shipwrecks: 18 August 1877
Ship	State	Description
Aghios Spyridos	Germany	The brig ran aground at the mouth of the Scarcies River. She was on a voyage from the Scarcies River to Marseille, Bouches-du-Rhône, France.
Bertha Marie	Norway	The yacht was driven ashore in the Weser. She was refloated and resumed her voyage.
Duesbury	United Kingdom	The ship was wrecked on the Arcas Shoals, off the coast of Mexico. Her crew were rescued.
Echo	New Zealand	The 27-ton schooner was wrecked at Raglan. She hit the bar at the mouth of Raglan Harbour, damaging her steering gear, and became stranded. Two crewmen drowned.
Marie	Flag unknown	The barque was wrecked at Thisted, Denmark. Her crew were rescued. She was on a voyage from Dordrecht, South Holland, Netherlands to Dram, Norway.
Robina Dunlop	Flag unknown	The ship was driven ashore at "Wargames". All on board were rescued. She was on a voyage from Wellington, New Zealand to Batavia, Netherlands East Indies. She was a total loss.

== 19 August ==
List of shipwrecks: 19 August 1877
Ship	State	Description
Ada	(Romania) United Principalities	Russo-Turkish War: The steamship was deliberately run ashore on Papadia Island, in the Danube downstream of Rahova by her pilot. She was set afire to prevent capture by Ottoman forces.
Ardeer	United Kingdom	The steamship was driven ashore on Mew Island, Copeland Islands, County Down. She was on a voyage from Barrow-in-Furness, Lancashire to Belfast, County Antrim. She was refloated the next day and taken in to Belfast.
Bertha Marie	United Kingdom	The barque was abandoned in the Atlantic Ocean. Her ten crew took to two boats. Five crew in one of the boats were rescued by an American steamship. Those in the other boat were reported missing, presumed dead. Bertha Marie was on a voyage from Port-au-Prince, Haiti to Falmouth, Cornwall.
Mable Harries	United Kingdom	The schooner departed from Dundalk, County Louth for the River Duddon. No further trace, presumed foundered with the loss of all three crew.

== 20 August ==
List of shipwrecks: 20 August 1877
Ship	State	Description
Carl	Germany	The ship collided with a barque off the Falsterbo Lighthouse, Sweden and sank. Her crew were rescued. She was on a voyage from Stettin to Nantes, Loire-Inférieure. She was later refloated and towed in to Helsingborg, Sweden for repairs.
Commodore	United Kingdom	The ship ran aground on the Freshwater Ledge, in the English Channel off the coast of Dorset. She was on a voyage from Caernarfon to Hamburg, Germany.
Lionel	New Zealand	The 15-ton steamer foundered at the entrance to Whangape Harbour when she capsized after being hit by surging waves. Five crew were lost.
Saguenay	Canada	The ship ran aground 2 nautical miles (3.7 km) from Chicoutimi, Quebec. Her passengers were taken off by the steamship Union ( Canada).

== 21 August ==
List of shipwrecks: 21 August 1877
Ship	State	Description
Lorton Vale	United Kingdom	The barque was wrecked in the Nun River. Her crew were rescued.

== 22 August ==
List of shipwrecks: 22 August 1877
Ship	State	Description
Hannah Coppack	United Kingdom	The ship ran aground 3 nautical miles (5.6 km) south east of the Gunfleet Lightship ( Trinity House) and was abandoned. Her crew were rescued. She was on a voyage from Sunderland, County Durham to "Potness".
St. David	United Kingdom	The schooner capsized and sank between Flat Holm and Steep Holm islands, in the Bristol Channel. She was on a voyage from Cardiff, Wales to Bridgwater with esparto; the crew took to the shiip's boat.
Vine	United Kingdom	The steamship ran aground at Hallands Väderö, Sweden. She was on a voyage from Antwerp, Belgium to Pillau, Germany. She was refloated and resumed her voyage.
Unnamed	Flag unknown	A schooner ran aground on the Longnose Rock, Margate, Kent, United Kingdom.

== 23 August ==
List of shipwrecks: 23 August 1877
Ship	State	Description
Fahrenheit	United Kingdom	The barque was wrecked at Falmouth, Jamaica.

== 24 August ==
List of shipwrecks: 24 August 1877
Ship	State	Description
Ada Iredal	United Kingdom	The ship ran aground off Cape Scala, Greece. She was on a voyage from Patras, Greece to Liverpool, Lancashire. She was refloated the next day and resumed her voyage.
August Marie	Netherlands	The schooner was wrecked at the mouth of the River Ythan. Her five crew survived.
Gratitude	Netherlands	The galiot collided with the schooner Otto (Denmark) and was abandoned by her crew, who were rescued by Otto. Gratitude was on a voyage from Königsberg, Germany to Nantes, Loire-Inférieure, France. She was taken in to Calais, France in a derelict condition on 27 August.
Montana	United Kingdom	The ship was driven ashore at "Castillas", Uruguay. Her crew were rescued. She was on a voyage from Cardiff, Glamorgan to Montevideo, Uruguay. She was a total loss.
Ville de Fuveau	France	The barque was driven ashore and wrecked at Cabezos, Spain. She was on a voyage from Marseille, Bouches-du-Rhône to the Gambia Colony and Protectorate. She was refloated with assistance from the tug Lion Belge ( (United Kingdom of Great Britain and Ireland) Gibraltar) and resumed her voyage.

== 25 August ==
List of shipwrecks: 25 August 1877
Ship	State	Description
Auguste Marie	United Kingdom	The ship ran aground at Newburgh, Aberdeenshire and was wrecked. She was on a voyage from Riga, Russia to Newburgh.
Carisbrooke, and an unnamed vessel	United Kingdom	The steamship Carisbrooke ran into and sank a barge at Portsmouth, Hampshire. Carisbrooke was on a voyage from Portsmouth to Southampton. She was severely damaged.
Dunkeld	United Kingdom	The lighter was holed whilst assisting to refloat the steamship Clanalpine (United Kingdom) and sank at Berwick upon Tweed, Northumberland.
Lord Mar	United Kingdom	The steamship collided with the paddle steamer Lord Elgin and ran aground at Alloa, Clackmannanshire. Lord Mar was on a voyage from Alloa to Leith, Lothian. She was refloated and completed her voyage.
Nugget	United Kingdom	The schooner ran aground on the Brissons Rocks, off the coast of Cornwall. She was on a voyage from Caernarfon to Torquay, Devon. She was refloated with assistance and taken in to St. Ives, Cornwall in a severely leaky condition.
Pride, and Saturn	United Kingdom	The schooners collided in the Crosby Channel and were both severely damaged. They were towed in to Liverpool, Lancashire.
Wilhelm Tell	Norway	The full-rigged ship was driven ashore at Understen, Sweden. She was on a voyage from Sundsvall, Sweden to an Australian port.
Unnamed	United Kingdom	The brig was driven ashore at Tarifa, Spain.
Unnamed	Flag unknown	The schooner was driven ashore near Penzance, Cornwall.
Unnamed	Flag unknown	The smack capsized off Milford Haven, Pembrokeshire, United Kingdom with the loss of both crew .

== 26 August ==
List of shipwrecks: 26 August 1877
Ship	State	Description
Glen Albyn	United Kingdom	The barque, on a guano-collecting voyage from Melbourne, Victoria, drifted ashore on Surprise Island, New Hebrides and was wrecked; crew eventually reached New Caledonia, 300 nautical miles (560 km) away, in the ship's boats.
Heimdall	Sweden	The steamship collided with the steamship Alice Otto (Flag unknown) in the Garston Channel and was beached near Liverpool, Lancashire, United Kingdom. She was on a voyage from Gothenburg to Liverpool. She broke in two and was declared a total loss. She was refloated on 7 September and taken in to Liverpool.
Robert Anderson	United Kingdom	The ship was driven ashore at Elgie Point, Caithness. She was refloated and taken in to Wick, Caithness in a leaky condition.
Vision	United Kingdom	The schooner was driven ashore at Saltfleet, Lincolnshire. Her crew were rescued. She was on a voyage from Sunderland, County Durham to Emsworth, Hampshire.

== 27 August ==
List of shipwrecks: 27 August 1877
Ship	State	Description
Arturo	Spain	The barque ran aground on Lundy Island, Devon, United Kingdom. She was on a voyage from "Formas" to Cardiff, Glamorgan, United Kingdom. She was refloated and taken in to Ilfracombe, Devon in a sinking condition.
Boris	Russia	The steamboat was run into by the steamboat Kormeeletz (Russia) and sank in the Volga with the loss of more than 120 lives.
Berwickshire	United Kingdom	The barque was driven ashore at Hong Kong. She was on a voyage from Saigon, French Indo-China to Manila, Spanish East Indies. She was refloated on 29 August and towed in to Hong Kong.
Candeur	Norway	The barque was driven ashore on Anholt. She was on a voyage from Liverpool, Lancashire, United Kingdom to Pillau, Germany. She was refloated with the assistance of a steamship.
County of Sutherland	United Kingdom	The steamship ran aground in the Hooghly River. She was refloated.
Dorothea Elizabeth	United Kingdom	The yacht ran aground and sank in Yell Sound.
Hertha	Germany	The galiot ran aground on the Nais Reef, in the Baltic Sea. She was on a voyage from Hamburg to Saint Petersburg, Russia.
Jeltina	Netherlands	The ship was wrecked on the Blaauwe Slenk, off the coast of Friesland. Her crew were rescued. SHe was on a voyage from Harlingen, Friesland to a Baltic port.
Johann	Germany	The barque was driven ashore at Cebu, Spanish East Indies. She was on a voyage from Nagasaki, Japan to Cebu. She was refloated.
Kents Bank	United Kingdom	The full-rigged ship departed from Manila for New York, United States. No further trace, reported missing.
Natividad	Spain	The brigantine foundered in the Atlantic Ocean. Her crew were rescued by the barque Tage (France). Natividad was on a voyage from Bremen, Germany to Mayagüez, Puerto Rico.
Peter Jebsen	Norway	The steamship ran aground at Stubben, Denmark. She was on a voyage from Hudiksvall to Cardiff. She was refloated and resumed her voyage.
Supply	United Kingdom	The ship was wrecked on the Dutchman's Bank, in the Irish Sea off the coast of Caernarfonshire. Her crew were rescued by the Penmon Lifeboat. She was on a voyage from Cork to Liverpool, Lancashire.
Vermont	United Kingdom	The ship was wrecked on Tenasserim Island, Burma.
600	Russia	The lighter sank at Kronstadt.
Unnamed	United Kingdom	The brig ran aground on The Shingles, off the north Kent coast.

== 28 August ==
List of shipwrecks: 28 August 1877
Ship	State	Description
Giuseppe	Italy	The schooner capsized in a squall in the Atlantic Ocean with the loss of two of her four crew. Survivors took to a boat; they were rescued on 10 September by the schooner Maud Barber (United States). Giuseppe was on a voyage from New Orleans, Louisiana, United States to Truxillo.
Hansine Marie	Denmark	The ship was abandoned off Gotland, Sweden in a sinking condition. Her crew were rescued by the schooner Concordia (Germany).
Harmoni	Norway	The schooner was driven ashore and wrecked at Fraserburgh, Aberdeenshire, United Kingdom. Her five crew survived. She was on avoyage from Grangemouth, Stirlingshire, United Kingdom to Mandal, Norway.
Queen	(United Kingdom of Great Britain and Ireland) Guernsey	The schooner was wrecked on Ouessant, Finistère, France. Her crew were rescued. She was on a voyage from A Coruña, Spain to Portsmouth, Hampshire.

== 29 August ==
List of shipwrecks: 29 August 1877
Ship	State	Description
Anafesto	Italy)	The ship collided with the steamship Zero (United Kingdom) and sank off Cape Spartivento. Her crew were rescued.
Mentor	Norway	The barque was wrecked at "Dragoumast", Russia. She was on a voyage from Cardiff, Glamorgan, United Kingdom to Kronstadt, Russia.
Splendid	France	The brig foundered off Cape San Antonio, Spain. Her crew were rescued by Balkaire (Flag unknown). Splendid was on a voyage from Rouen, Seine-Inférieure to Barcelona, Spain.
Vigilant	Norway	The schooner foundered in the North Sea. Her crew were rescued by the schooner Cairnrankie (United Kingdom).

== 30 August ==
List of shipwrecks: 30 August 1877
Ship	State	Description
Edward Saul	United Kingdom	The ship was damaged by fire whilst on a voyage from "Port Lavan" to Runcorn, Cheshire. She put in to Milford Haven, Pembrokeshire.
Fannie	United Kingdom	The ship departed from the Tonalá River for a British port. No further trace, presumed foundered with the loss of all hands.
George Peabody	United Kingdom	The ship sank in a squall off West Arichat, Nova Scotia, Canada with the loss of six of her nine crew.
Rose	France	The schooner ran aground at Newport, Monmouthshire, United Kingdom and was damaged. She was on a voyage from Saint-Nazaire, Loire-Inférieure to Newport.

== 31 August ==
List of shipwrecks: 31 August 1877
Ship	State	Description
Louise	Germany	The schooner was driven ashore on Inchgarvie, in the Firth of Forth.
Maitland	United Kingdom	The steamship was driven ashore at "Walsoarne", in the Gulf of Bothnia.
Marion	United Kingdom	The barque was driven ashore on Belle Isle, Newfoundland Colony. Her crew were rescued by the steamship Peruvia (United Kingdom). Marion was on a voyage from Newcastle upon Tyne, Northumberland to Quebec City. She was a total loss.
Star of Hope	United Kingdom	The schooner collided with the steamship Bradley and foundered off Flamborough Head, Yorkshire with the loss of a crew member. Survivors were rescued by Bradley. Star of Hope was on a voyage from Shoreham-by-Sea, Sussex to Hartlepool, County Durham.

== Unknown date ==
List of shipwrecks: Unknown date in August 1877
Ship	State	Description
Adela	United Kingdom	The brig ran aground at Niuzhuang (Niuchang), China. It was reported that she would probably be condemned.
Aghios Spyridon	Germany	The brig ran aground at the mouth of the Scarcies River. She was on a voyage from the Scarcies River to Marseille, Bouches-du-Rhône France.
Alice	(France) Mauritius	The schooner was wrecked on "Soimba Island". Her crew were rescued.
Annie Fleming	United Kingdom	The ship was wrecked at "Schooner Pond", Nova Scotia, Canada. She was on a voyage from Quebec City, Canada to Ardrossan, Ayrshire.
Boston	United Kingdom	The steamship ran aground at Middlesbrough, Yorkshire. She was on a voyage from Middlesbrough to Stettin, Germany.
Carbon	United Kingdom	The steamship was driven ashore at Ceuta, Spain. She was on a voyage from Algiers, Algeria to Pomaron, Portugal. She was refloated and taken in to Gibraltar in a leaky condition.
Clanalpine	United Kingdom	The steamship was driven ashore at Berwick upon Tweed, Northumberland.
Corunna	Spain	The ship was driven ashore on the coast of Jutland. She was refloated and resumed her voyage, but put in to Helsinki, Grand Duchy of Finland on 18 August in a leaky condition.
Crested Wave	United Kingdom	The ship was driven ashore at Fuzhou, China. She was on a voyage from Fuzhou to the Cape of Good Hope, Cape Colony. She was refloated and taken in to Amoy, China, where she arrived on 18 August. She was repaired.
Dispacchio	Italy	The steamship was wrecked on the Porei Shoals, off Trapani, Sicily, All 150 people on board were rescued.
Dobhran	United Kingdom	The steamship was driven ashore on Raasay, Outer Hebrides. She was refloated on 11 September and beached at "Poul Doin", Ross-shire. She was placed under repair, and departed for the Clyde on 15 September.
Dragon, and HMS Frolic	China; Royal Navy	The steamship Dragon collided with the gunboat HMS Frolic. She was on a voyage from Shanghai to Nagasaki, Japan and was damaged. She put back to Shanghai. HMS Frolic was severely damaged and was beached.
Edith	South Australia	The ship was wrecked on the coast of South Australia with the loss of five lives.
Elpis	Greece	The brig ran aground at Longobardi, Italy.
Faith	(United Kingdom of Great Britain and Ireland) Guernsey	The brig ran aground on The Shingles, in the Thames Estuary. She was on a voyage from Guernsey to London. She was refloated with assistance from the tug Vigilant (United Kingdom) and taken in tow for London
Flora	United Kingdom	The barque was destroyed by fire at sea with the loss of a crew member. Survivors were rescued by the steamship Counsellor (United Kingdom). Flora was on a voyage from the Clyde to Bombay, India.
Friede	Germany	The brig ran aground on the Lillegrund, in the Baltic Sea. She was refloated on 1 September with the assistance of a steamship and taken in to Copenhagen, Denmark.
Gathorne	United Kingdom	The steamship was driven ashore on Bornholm, Denmark and was damaged. She was refloated.
Helen	United Kingdom	The steam yacht was driven ashore at Little Scar, in Luce Bay. She was refloated with assistance from the tug Fury (United Kingdom) and towed in to the Isle of Whithorn, Wigtownshire in a severely leaky condition.
John Henry	United Kingdom	The barque was wrecked at the mouth of the Chiltepee River. She was on a voyage from Mexico to an English port.
Kenilworth	United Kingdom	The barque was driven ashore and wrecked 20 nautical miles (37 km) west of Cape Norman, Newfoundland Colony. All on board took to a boat; they were rescued on 27 August by the steamship Sarmatian (United Kingdom). Kenilworth was on a voyage from Quebec City to Greenock, Renfrewshire.
Liffey	United Kingdom	The ship was wrecked in the Maldives. Her crew were rescued. She was on a voyage from Mauritius to Calcutta, India.
Louisa Alois	Netherlands	The ship was driven ashore on Anholt, Denmark. She was on a voyage from Newcastle upon Tyne, Northumberland, United Kingdom to Turku, Grand Duchy of Finland.
Madras	United Kingdom	The ship ran aground in the Saint Lawrence River. She was on a voyage from Greenock to Quebec City. She was refloated and completed her voyage.
Mecca	United Kingdom	The steamship ran aground on the Krishna Shoa, in the Bay of Bengal. She was refloated. The cause was attributed to the collapse of the Krishna Lighthouse, which had occurred a few days before.
Murillo	Flag unknown	The ship was wrecked near "Coneje". She was on a voyage from "Honda" to "Coneje".
New Orleans	United States	The steamship was driven ashore at Cape Canaveral, Florida. She was on a voyage from New York to New Orleans, Louisiana. She was refloated and completed her voyage.
Normanby	United Kingdom	The steamship struck a sunken rock and was beached in the Percy Islands, Queensland.
Othere	United Kingdom	The barque was driven ashore and wrecked on Isle Madame, Nova Scotia She was on a voyage from Newport, Monmouthshire to Miramichi, New Brunswick, Canada. She was refloated.
Peri	Queensland	The ship foundered off Double Island Point before 20 August.
Plover	United Kingdom	The ship was driven ashore at Saint John's, Newfoundland Colony. She was refloated.
Ruhtinas	(Russian Empire) Grand Duchy of Finland	The barque home port Nystad, master A. Andersson, was wrecked on unknown rock at N 15 44' E 110 22' in the South China Sea. Her crew took to the boats; a British ship rescued them two days later. She was on a voyage from Bangkok, Siam to Hong Kong.
Sea Star	United Kingdom	The ship was wrecked on a reef in the Pacific Ocean before 7 August. Her crew were rescued. She was on a voyage from Nagasaki to Falmouth, Cornwall.
Sinerab	France	The steamship was driven ashore at Gibraltar. She was on a voyage from Gibraltar to "Barbarg".
Sistrallofer	Sweden	The ship was driven ashore at "Dragoumast", Russia. She was on a voyage from Rossano, Italy to Saint Petersburg, Russia.
Swallow	United Kingdom	The brigantine was wrecked at White Point, Nova Scotia. Her crew were rescued. She was on a voyage from Madeira to Halifax, Nova Scotia.
Thyra, and Henry Bolckow	Denmark; Germany	The steamships collided off Falsterbo, Sweden and were both severely damaged. Both vessels put in to Falsterbo. Thyra was on a voyage from Königsberg, Germany to Bordeaux, Gironde, France.
Wanakoura Maru	Japan	The steamship struck rocks off Diamond Point and was severely damaged. She was taken in to Yokosuka for repairs.
William Tell	United Kingdom	The ship was driven ashore in the Baltic Sea. She was on a voyage from Sundsvall, Sweden to Australia.
