= Julio Blanco =

Cuban footballer (1937–2020)

Personal information
- Full name: Julio Ignacio Blanco Alfonso
- Date of birth: 18 September 1937
- Place of birth: Havana, Cuba
- Date of death: 10 April 2020 (aged 82)
- Place of death: Havana, Cuba
- Position: Goalkeeper

Senior career*
Years	Team	Apps	(Gls)
1955–1957	Deportivo Puentes Grandes		
1957–1961	Deportivo Mordazo		
1962–1967	FC Industriales		

International career
1959–1962	Cuba	8	(0)

Managerial career
- ?–?: Deportivo Industriales
- * Club domestic league appearances and goals

Julio Ignacio Blanco Alfonso (18 September 1937 – 10 April 2020) was a Cuban footballer who played goalkeeper.

== Playing career ==
=== Club career ===
Blanco was raised in Puentes Grandes, by parents from Ourense, Spain. He first played for Deportivo Puentes Grandes until 1957, before joining Deportivo Mordazo. Here, he won the three championships of the Campeonato Nacional de Fútbol de Cuba in 1958, 1959, and 1961.

In October 1958, Mordazo went on a tour of Mexico, where he distinguished himself in multiple matches and was praised by the Mexican press. In 1961, Blanco spent six months in Spain and negotiated a contract with RCD Espanyol, which fell through and he returned to Mordazo. He ended his career in 1967 with FC Industriales, with whom he won championships in 1963 and 1964.

=== International career ===
In 1959, Blanco played his first match for Cuba at the Pan American Games in Chicago. He was injured during a game against Costa Rica.

He took part in the 1960 and 1961 CCCF Championships in Havana and San José, playing four games in total. His last match for Cuba came in 1962 in the Central American and Caribbean Games in a match against Jamaica when Cuba was already down 5-1. He could not save his team from defeat, with a final score of 6-1.

=== Death ===
Blanco died on 10 April 2020 at the age of 82 in Havana.
