= Cook's Harbour =

- Town
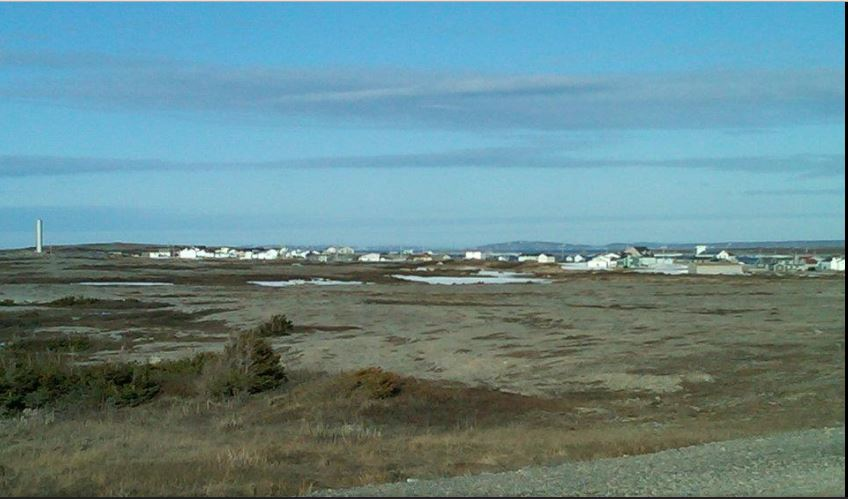
- View of Cook's Harbour

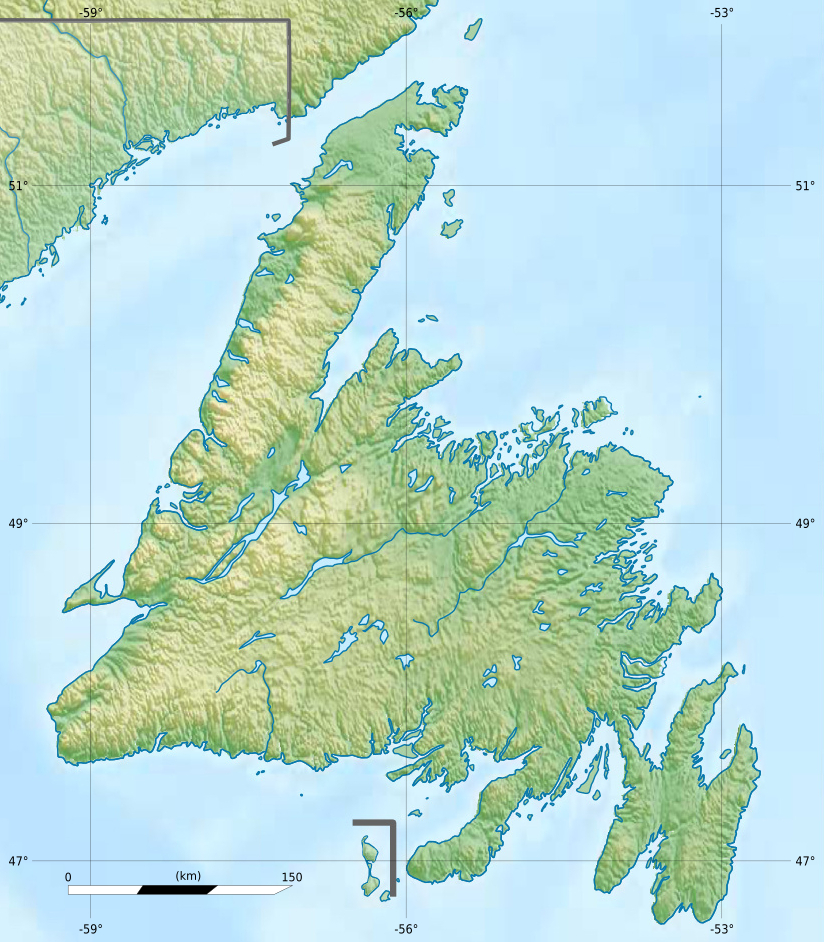
- Location within Newfoundland Location within Canada
- Coordinates: 51°36′12″N 55°52′16″W
- Country: Canada
- Province: Newfoundland and Labrador

Area
  - Land: 1.95 km^{2} (0.75 sq mi)

Population (2021)
  - Total: 118
  - Density: 62.9/km^{2} (163/sq mi)
- Time zone: UTC-3:30 (Newfoundland Time)
  - Summer (DST): UTC-2:30 (Newfoundland Daylight)
- Area code: 709
- Highways: Route 435

Cook's Harbour is a town in the Canadian province of Newfoundland and Labrador. The town had a population of 123 in the Canada 2016 Census. The population, as of 2021, was 118 (including Wild Bight and Boat Harbour), and has been decreasing. Cook’s Harbour is about 45 minutes away from St. Anthony and 6 hours from Corner Brook.

The school in Cook's Harbour is called James Cook Memorial; there are three students in the school as of 2021.

== History ==
Cook's Harbour was named by Captain James Cook in 1764, during his survey of Newfoundland. For most of its history, Cook's Harbour was a successful fishing port, that was only limited by a lack of berths in the harbour for extra boats on the wharf. However, by 1985, fishing started to decline due to a drop in fish stocks. This was attributed to larger boats starting to fish in the area. Due to the 1992 Federal moratorium on cod fishing, the vast majority of the town's inhabitants emigrated due to the lack of job opportunities. Most of the towns amenities are now located within a central community hub. The lack of human activity often leads to polar bears entering the town during winter. In 2017, to celebrate the 250th anniversary of Cook mapping Newfoundland, Cook's Harbour became part of a new walking trail.

== Demographics ==
In the 2021 Census of Population conducted by Statistics Canada, Cook's Harbour had a population of 118, living in 67 of its 92 total private dwellings, a decrease of −4.1% from the 2016 total (123). With a land area of 1.94 km^{2} (0.75 sq mi), it had a population density of 60.8/km^{2} (157.5/sq mi) in 2021.
