= Ha Ha Bay =

Bay in Newfoundland and Labrador

Coordinates: 51°34′31″N 55°43′22″W

Location of Ha Ha Bay in Newfoundland

Ha Ha Bay is a natural bay located on the northern tip of the Northern Peninsula of the island of Newfoundland, in the Canadian province of Newfoundland and Labrador.

Ha Ha Bay is a relatively small bay located east of Pistolet Bay. The bay is in a generally north–south orientation with the town of Raleigh, located at the inner part of the bay.
