= Pistolet Bay =

Body of water in Newfoundland, Canada

Coordinates: 51.54°N 55.81°W

Location of Pistolet Bay in Newfoundland

Pistolet Bay is a natural bay located on the northern tip of the Great Northern Peninsula of the island of Newfoundland, in the Canadian province of Newfoundland and Labrador.

The entrance to Pistolet bay is from the Strait of Belle Isle. The west side of the bay creates another bay called Shallow Bay; further, the southeast extremity of the bay narrows into a fjord called Milan Arm. Burnt Cape Ecological Reserve is located within Pistolet Bay.
