= St. Mein Bay =

Natural bay in Newfoundland and Labrador, Canada

Coordinates: 51.37°N 55.55°W

St. Mein Bay is a natural bay off the island of Newfoundland in the province of Newfoundland and Labrador, Canada. It is located on the eastern side of the tip of the Great Northern Peninsula, and the village of St. Anthony is nearby.
