= Centro Educativo Español de La Habana =

Location
- Preschool and Primary: Calle 5ªB #6615 e/ 66 y 70. Miramar, Playa. La Habana, Cuba. Secondary: Calle 14 Esq 7ª #520 e/ 5ª y 7ª. Miramar, Playa. La Habana, Cuba"; Havana; Cuba

Information
- Type: K-12 school
- Grades: K-12
- Website: www.ceehabana.com

Centro Educativo Español de La Habana (CEEH) is a private Spanish curriculum, Spanish-language international school in Havana, Cuba. It consists of two campuses, a nursery through primary campus and a secondary campus, in Miramar, Playa. These campuses are less than 3 kilometres (1.9 mi) apart.

It serves nursery (age 2) up until bachillerato (senior high school/sixth form college). Students are sons and daughters of Spanish citizens resident in Havana, other foreigners, diplomats, and businesspersons.

Campuses
