= Raleigh, Newfoundland and Labrador =

Raleigh
- Town
- Interactive map of Raleigh
- Coordinates: 51°33′32″N 55°43′43″W
- Country: Canada
- Province: Newfoundland and Labrador

Population (2021)
  - Total: 150
- Time zone: UTC-3:30 (Newfoundland Time)
  - Summer (DST): UTC-2:30 (Newfoundland Daylight)
- Area code: 709
- Highways: Route 437

Raleigh is a town located northwest of St. Anthony. It had a population of 295 in 1956, declining to 150 by the 2021 census.

== Name ==
Raleigh was originally named Ha Ha Bay, after the bay where it is located. The community was renamed after Sir Walter Raleigh, and public notice of the change was given by John R. Bennett, Colonial Secretary, on 24 March 1914. Coincidentally, in 1922, the Royal Navy cruiser HMS Raleigh, the flagship of the North Atlantic & West Indies squadron, ran aground across the straits in Labrador. Though untrue, local folklore holds that the town of Raleigh was renamed after the ship; this is an example of folk etymology.

== General information ==
Raleigh is located about 29 kilometres (18 mi) from St. Anthony. Raleigh has a harbour with Burnt Cape on one side to protect against the elements in the very harsh winters - which can see 12.3-metre (40 ft) snowbanks after a winter storm. The Burnt Cape Ecological Reserve lies within the town's boundaries. Winter sports, particularly snowmobiling are a popular activity. With abundant fish in nearby rivers, the Raleigh area is popular for ice fishing.

== Demographics ==
In the 2021 Census of Population conducted by Statistics Canada, Raleigh had a population of 150 living in 75 of its 108 total private dwellings, a change of −15.3% from its 2016 population of 177. With a land area of 11.27 km^{2} (4.35 sq mi), it had a population density of 13.3/km^{2} (34.5/sq mi) in 2021.
