= Cape Norman Bay =

Natural bay in Newfoundland and Labrador, Canada

Coordinates: 51.616°N 55.881°W

Cape Norman Bay is a natural bay near Cape Norman, off the island of Newfoundland in the province of Newfoundland and Labrador, Canada.
