= Big Brook =

Coordinates: 51.520°N 56.151°W

Location of Big Brook in Newfoundland and Labrador

Big Brook was a small settlement in the Canadian province of Newfoundland and Labrador that has since been resettled. It is classified among the province’s abandoned or relocated communities, a phenomenon associated with government-sponsored resettlement programs carried out during the 20th century.

== See also ==
List of ghost towns in Newfoundland and Labrador
