= Cape Norman, Newfoundland and Labrador =

Settlement in Newfoundland and Labrador, Canada

Coordinates: 51.620°N 55.897°W

Location of Cape Norman in Newfoundland and Labrador

Cape Norman is a locality in the Canadian province of Newfoundland and Labrador. It is the northernmost village on the island of Newfoundland. It is situated slightly inland of Cape Norman Bay.
