= Burnt Cape Ecological Reserve =

Nature reserve in Canada

- IUCN category II (national park)
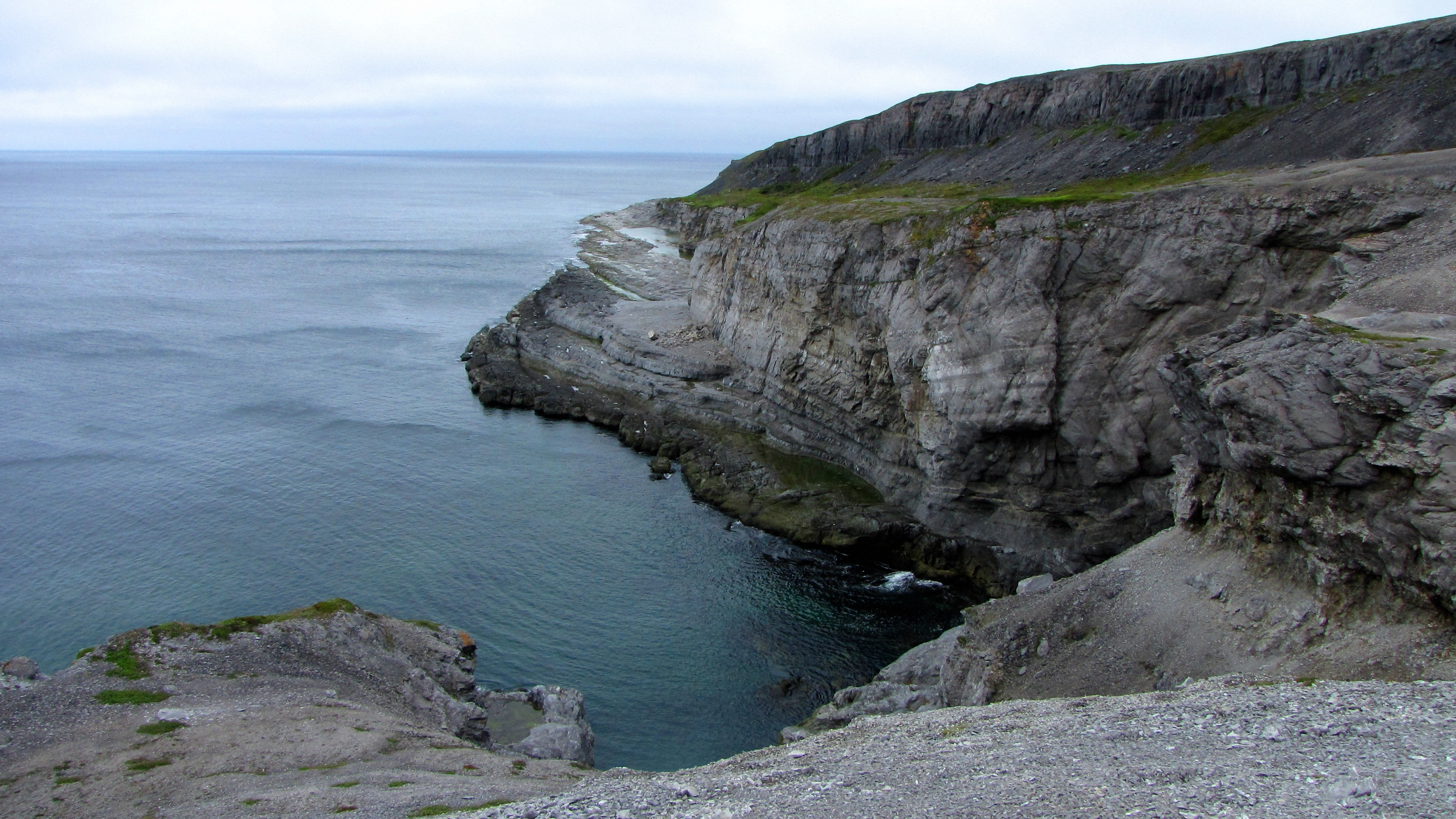
- Burnt Cape
- Interactive map of Burnt Cape Ecological Reserve
- Location: Raleigh, Newfoundland and Labrador, Canada
- Nearest city: St. John's
- Coordinates: 51°34′23″N 55°44′45″W
- Area: 3.6 km^{2} (1.4 sq mi)
- Governing body: Newfoundland and Labrador, Dept. of Environment and Conservation

Location of Burnt Cape, Newfoundland

Burnt Cape Ecological Reserve is a nature reserve located within the town of Raleigh, Newfoundland and Labrador, and just northwest of Pistolet Bay Provincial Park. It has a large area of exposed limestone and a naturally harsh climate that permits the growth of rare dwarf flora often found in arctic and alpine areas.

== See also ==
- List of protected areas of Newfoundland and Labrador
