= Puentes Grandes =

Neighborhood near Havana, Cuba

Puentes Grandes (Spanish for "large bridges") is a neighborhood in the municipality of Playa, Havana, in Cuba

The neighborhood is located near the District of Miramar and Vedado District and it has a population of 5,830.

== Overview ==
The old neighborhood of Puentes Grandes had its origin at the end of the 16th century. It formed in one of the first neighborhoods that were established in the surroundings of Havana. The local amenity attracted several families of the capital, which there built summer mansions to swim in the pure waters of the Almendares River.
