= St. Lunaire-Griquet =

- Town
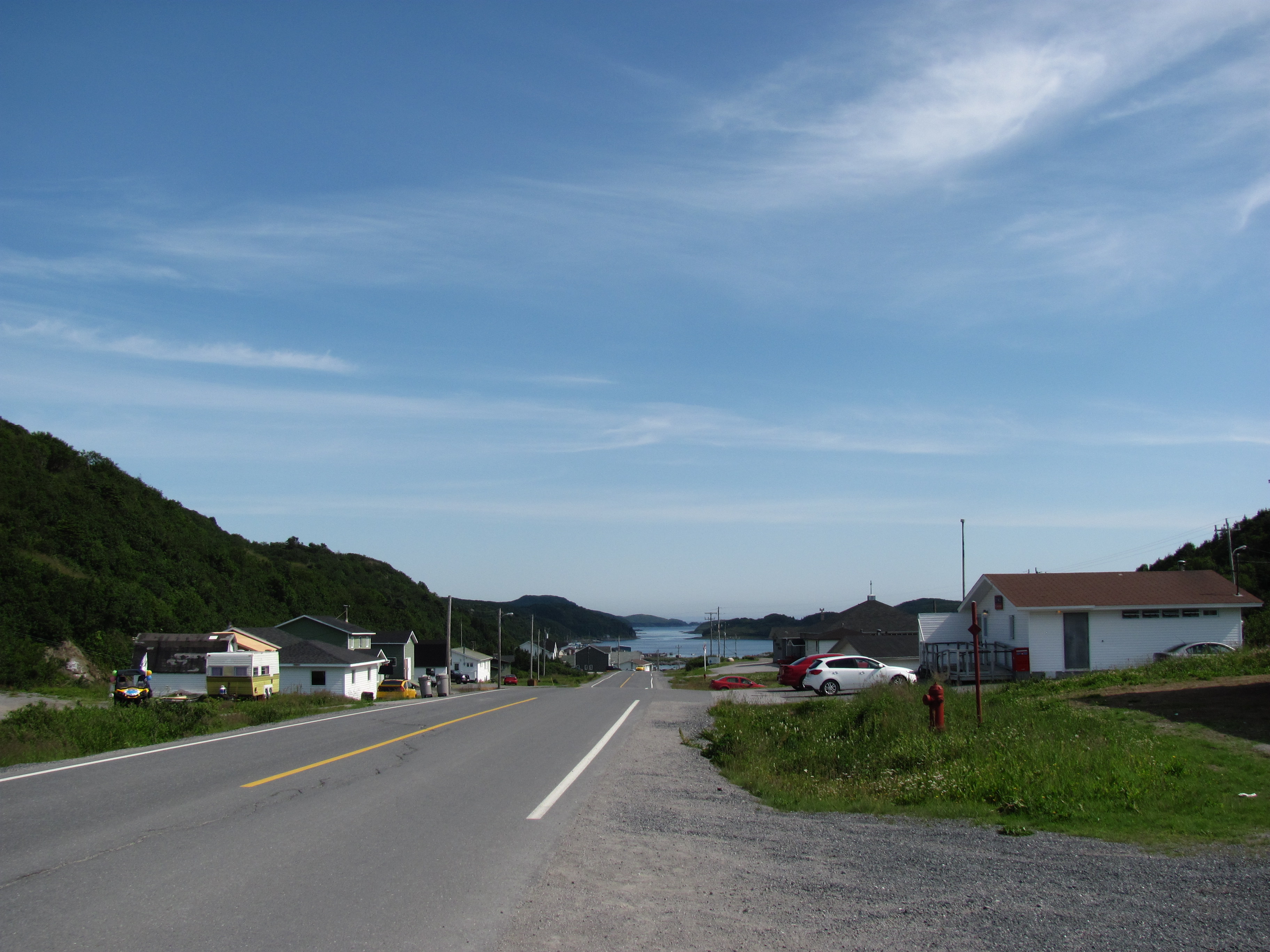
- Main Street in St. Lunaire-Griquet, with White Cape Harbour in the distance
- Interactive map of St. Lunaire-Griquet
- Coordinates: 51°31′14″N 55°28′51″W
- Country: Canada
- Province: Newfoundland and Labrador

Area
  - Land: 16.68 km^{2} (6.44 sq mi)

Population (2021)
  - Total: 603
  - Density: 36.2/km^{2} (94/sq mi)
- Time zone: UTC-3:30 (Newfoundland Time)
  - Summer (DST): UTC-2:30 (Newfoundland Daylight)
- Area code: 709
- Highways: Route 436

St. Lunaire-Griquet is a town in the Canadian province of Newfoundland and Labrador. The town is located near the northern tip of the Great Northern Peninsula of Newfoundland. The town had a population of 603 in the Canada 2021 Census. According to World Population Review, the population as of 2026 is 554.

== History ==
French fishermen began fishing the region in the 16th century. However, St. Lunaire bay was not mapped until 1784 by the French sailor Liberge de Granchain. An island in the mouth of St. Lunaire bay still bears his namesake. Evidence of ancient French fishing activity in this bay can be still observed in the remains of old French bread ovens on Granchain Island. The name may be from Saint-Lunaire in Brittany, named after Saint Leonorus.

== Demographics ==
In the 2021 Census of Population conducted by Statistics Canada, St. Lunaire-Griquet had a population of 603 living in 258 of its 302 total private dwellings, a change of −0.2% from its 2016 population of 604. With a land area of 17.29 km^{2} (6.68 sq mi), it had a population density of 34.9/km^{2} (90.3/sq mi) in 2021. According to World Population Review, the population as of 2026 is 554.

== Culture and sights ==
St. Monica's Church is a wooden Roman Catholic church with a small flèche instead of a spire. It is opposite the Town Hall on Main Street. A Memorial depicting strong community leaders and developers with colourful models of ships and lighthouses were erected on Main Street as well.

The Wild Berry Economusée on route 436 is the world's only museum dedicated to the interpretation of wild berries. The town also includes a small hotel which is convenient for visitors of L'Anse aux Meadows. There is a lookout that provides a great view of the entire town and the ocean. The access to the lookout is a wooden staircase that is located just behind the school off of main street. During the months of June and July visitors can observe icebergs making their way towards Newfoundland shores as the town is one of the most Northern locations of "Ice Berg Alley".

St. Lunaire-Griquet is amongst the few remaining areas that culturally seal hunt, but it is not a necessity to its residents. It is one of the northernmost points on the island of Newfoundland, with the only further north ones being towns like L'Anse aux Meadows, Gunners Cove, and Quirpon. It was birthed as a fishing community and remains highly influenced as such to this day.

St. Lunaire-Griquet is 10 km from UNESCO World Heritage site of L'Anse aux Meadows.

== Education ==
The children of St. Lunaire-Griquet serve the school Truman Eddison Memorial for grades Kindergarten to Grade 6 and serve White Hills Academy from 7-12. You can verify this by going to the official NLSchools Bus Planner Site.

== See also ==
- List of cities and towns in Newfoundland and Labrador
