= St. Anthony, Newfoundland and Labrador =

St. Anthony
- Town
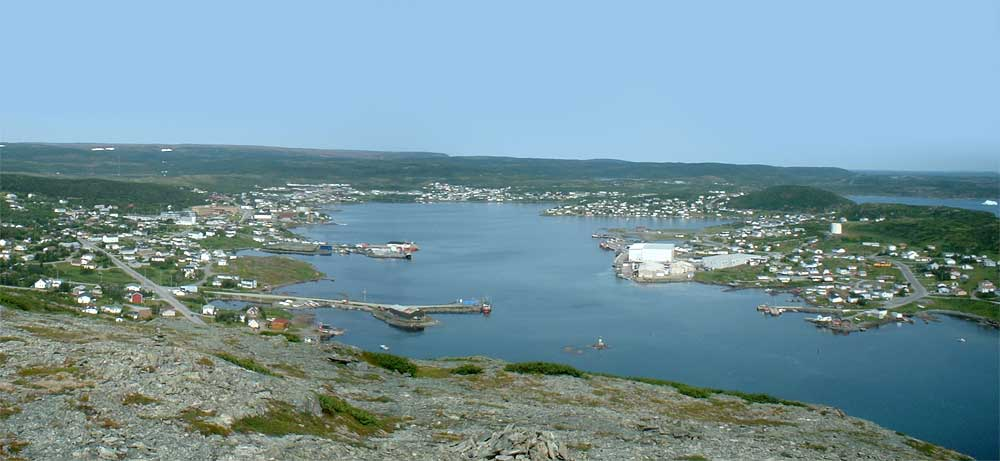

- Seal Coat of arms

- Location of St. Anthony in Newfoundland St. Anthony (Newfoundland and Labrador)
- Coordinates: 51°22′30″N 55°36′59″W
- Country: Canada
- Province: Newfoundland and Labrador
- Settled: early 16th century

Government
  - Type: Town Council
  - Mayor: Michelle Tucker

Area
  - Land: 37.02 km^{2} (14.29 sq mi)

Population (2021)
  - Town: 2,180
  - Density: 61/km^{2} (160/sq mi)
  - Urban: 1,986
- Time zone: UTC−03:30 (NST)
  - Summer (DST): UTC−02:30 (NDT)
- Postal Code Span: A0K 4S0 / 4T0
- Area code: 709
- Highways: Route 430
- Website: www.stanthony.ca

St. Anthony is a town on the northern reaches of the Great Northern Peninsula of the Canadian province of Newfoundland and Labrador. St. Anthony serves as a main service centre for northern Newfoundland and southern Labrador. St. Anthony had a population of 2,180 in 2021, compared with 2,258 in 2016, 2,418 in 2011, 2,476 in 2006 and 2,730 in 2001.

L'Anse aux Meadows, which was designated a National Historic Site of Canada in 1968 and a World Heritage Site by UNESCO in 1978, is located 40 km from St. Anthony. St. Anthony is the largest population centre on the Great Northern Peninsula.

== History ==
The history of European settlement of St. Anthony reaches back to the early 16th century, when French and Basque fishermen used the well-sheltered harbour as a seasonal fishing station. By the time explorer Jacques Cartier came across the settlement in 1534, he reported it was named St. Anthony Haven.

More people began arriving in the mid-19th century. By 1857, a census found 71 inhabitants in 10 families. By 1874, the population rose to 110, and by 1891, it was 139.

The town grew in population after the arrival of Dr. Wilfred Grenfell in 1900 (see below).

A salt fish plant and cold storage facility built in the 1930s and 1940s were a boon to the local economy.

St. Anthony also became an outpost for the U.S. military. In 1951, a Pinetree Line radar site was built on a nearby hill, and by 1962, there were 250 servicemen stationed there. The site was operated by the 921st AC&W Squadron.

Tourism has become an important industry to the town as fishing stocks dwindled. Tourists come to visit historical sites related to Grenfell, to see the nearby Viking settlement at L'Anse aux Meadows or to see natural attractions such as icebergs and whales.

=== Dr. Wilfred Grenfell ===
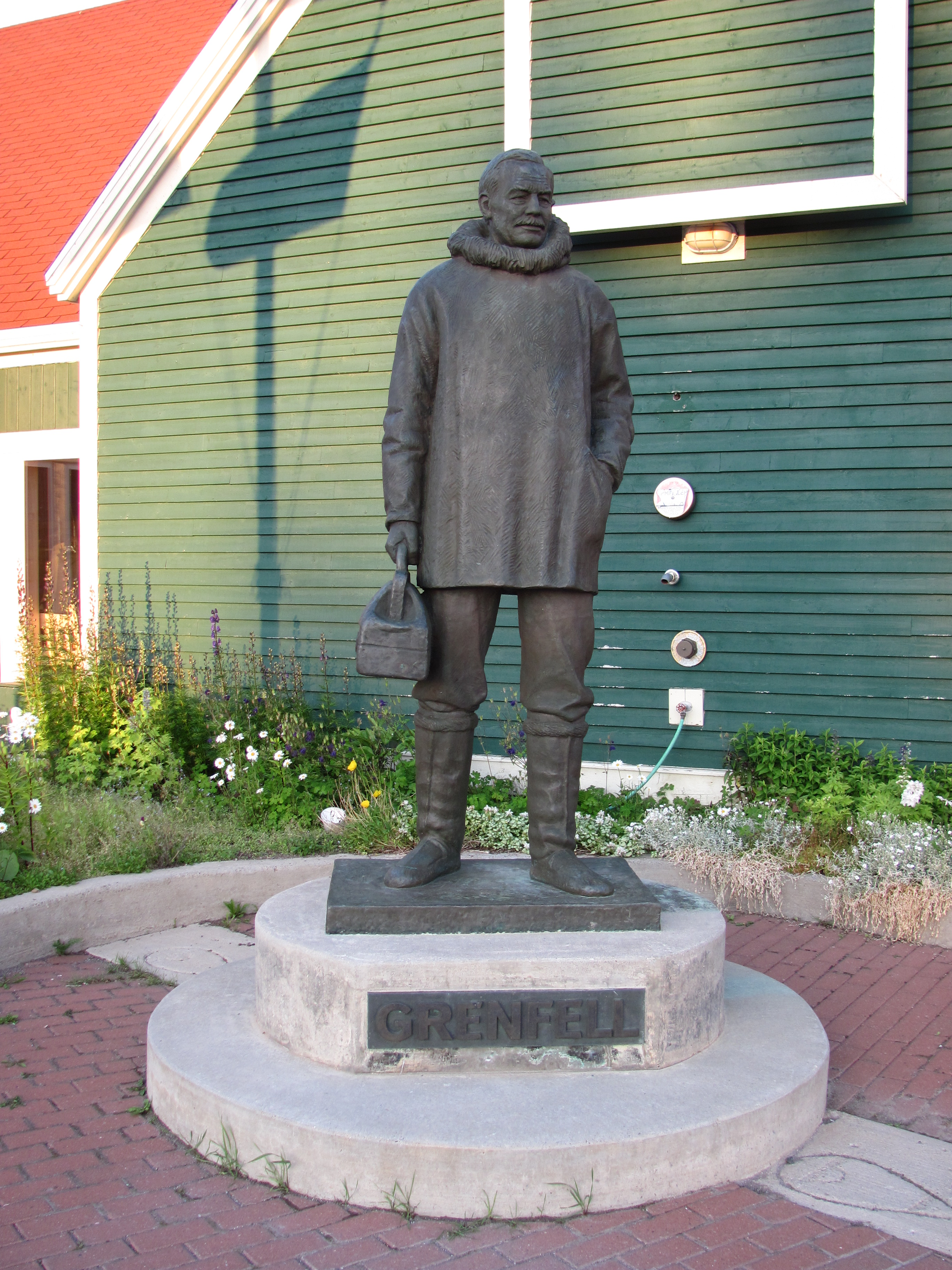
Grenfell Memorial

St. Anthony's most influential historic figure is Dr. Wilfred Grenfell.

Born on February 28, 1865, in northern England, Grenfell entered the London Hospital Medical School in 1883. While in London, Grenfell heard the American evangelist Dwight L. Moody. The event inspired him to a life of Christian charity.

A member of the Royal National Mission To Deep Sea Fishermen, Grenfell was sent to investigate the conditions of fishermen in the Labrador region in 1892. He was said to be the first doctor to reach the region. He would later establish a string of hospitals, cooperatives and schools for people in remote Newfoundland and Labrador towns. He chose Red Bay as the headquarters of the Grenfell Mission in 1900. However, in later years the focus of the organization became St. Anthony. He began responsibility of health care for the more than thirty thousand residents in Northern Newfoundland and Southern Labrador. This health responsibility was maintained until 1981 when the Government bought the resources and took over responsibility for the health service for one dollar. Dr. Grenfell was most interested in the holistic approach to betterment of the lifestyle of the people of the province. He worked in areas of food production, craft production and sale. Grenfell also worked to provide funds for his religious mission through speaking tours throughout the United States and Europe and he used colorized slides of the people and places he was operating his mission. He began to work from a non denominational Christian belief structure and religious conversion was his goal. Although the religious based mission was successful he was supported by volunteers who gave service to the mission. One notable volunteer was Josephine Colgate of the Colgate fortune.

Grenfell died in 1940 and his ashes were interred at Tea House Hill in St. Anthony with those of his wife Lady Anne Grenfell. Dr. Grenfell's contributions to the region are honoured by Grenfell Historic Properties, which comprises the Grenfell Interpretation Centre, the Grenfell House Museum, and the Grenfell Handicrafts Store.

== Demographics ==
In the 2021 Census of Population conducted by Statistics Canada, St. Anthony had a population of 2,180 living in 924 of its 1,036 total private dwellings, a change of −3.5% from its 2016 population of 2,258. With a land area of 37.46 km^{2} (14.46 sq mi), it had a population density of 58.2/km^{2} (150.7/sq mi) in 2021.

Historical populations St. Anthony, NL
Year	Pop.	±%
1951	1,380	—
1956	1,761	+27.6%
1961	1,820	+3.4%
1966	2,269	+24.7%
1971	2,593	+14.3%
1976	2,987	+15.2%
1981	3,107	+4.0%
1986	3,180	+2.3%
1991	3,164	−0.5%
1996	2,996	−5.3%
2001	2,730	−8.9%
2006	2,476	−9.3%
2011	2,418	−2.3%
2016	2,258	−6.6%
2021	2,180	−3.5%

== Climate ==
St. Anthony experiences a subarctic climate (Köppen climate classification Dfc) with long, cold winters and short, mild summers. However, owing to the strong maritime influence, the winters are milder than most of Canada at the same latitude, and there is no permafrost especially with snow cover sometimes reaching as high as 276 centimetres (108.7 in). However its winters are still far more severe than Valentia Island off the coast of Ireland half a degree of latitude farther north on the other side of the Atlantic which enjoys the moderating effects of the Gulf Stream. St. Anthony is as much as 11.4 °C (20.5 °F) colder than London on a near exact latitude in an average year. Precipitation, driven by the powerful Icelandic Low, is quite high year round, with an annual average of approximately 1,300 millimetres (51.2 in).

Climate data for St. Anthony (1981–2010)
Month	Jan	Feb	Mar	Apr	May	Jun	Jul	Aug	Sep	Oct	Nov	Dec	Year
Record high humidex	5.7	4.1	8.6	10.6	23.0	30.6	36.6	34.5	28.5	21.0	14.4	7.3	36.6
Record high °C (°F)	6.0 (42.8)	6.7 (44.1)	9.4 (48.9)	14.1 (57.4)	22.8 (73.0)	27.4 (81.3)	28.2 (82.8)	30.0 (86.0)	24.3 (75.7)	20.0 (68.0)	13.2 (55.8)	8.3 (46.9)	30.0 (86.0)
Mean daily maximum °C (°F)	−7.5 (18.5)	−8.0 (17.6)	−3.7 (25.3)	1.1 (34.0)	6.4 (43.5)	11.6 (52.9)	16.5 (61.7)	16.8 (62.2)	12.7 (54.9)	6.5 (43.7)	1.0 (33.8)	−3.8 (25.2)	4.1 (39.4)
Daily mean °C (°F)	−11.8 (10.8)	−12.1 (10.2)	−7.4 (18.7)	−1.9 (28.6)	2.8 (37.0)	7.1 (44.8)	12.0 (53.6)	12.6 (54.7)	8.8 (47.8)	3.5 (38.3)	−1.9 (28.6)	−7.5 (18.5)	0.3 (32.5)
Mean daily minimum °C (°F)	−16.1 (3.0)	−16.2 (2.8)	−11.1 (12.0)	−4.9 (23.2)	−0.8 (30.6)	2.7 (36.9)	7.4 (45.3)	8.4 (47.1)	4.9 (40.8)	0.4 (32.7)	−4.8 (23.4)	−11.3 (11.7)	−3.5 (25.7)
Record low °C (°F)	−32.8 (−27.0)	−31.7 (−25.1)	−31.6 (−24.9)	−22.5 (−8.5)	−11.7 (10.9)	−3.1 (26.4)	−2.0 (28.4)	−0.3 (31.5)	−2.5 (27.5)	−10.7 (12.7)	−17.5 (0.5)	−30.6 (−23.1)	−32.8 (−27.0)
Record low wind chill	−51.1	−50.0	−48.5	−35.7	−23.3	−11.3	−4.4	0.0	−8.7	−22.2	−28.7	−47.8	−51.1
Average precipitation mm (inches)	113.9 (4.48)	94.6 (3.72)	98.0 (3.86)	81.9 (3.22)	82.7 (3.26)	123.5 (4.86)	106.3 (4.19)	107.6 (4.24)	119.8 (4.72)	125.3 (4.93)	115.7 (4.56)	138.1 (5.44)	1,307.3 (51.47)
Average rainfall mm (inches)	7.6 (0.30)	5.5 (0.22)	17.8 (0.70)	34.1 (1.34)	64.4 (2.54)	119.2 (4.69)	106.3 (4.19)	107.6 (4.24)	119.6 (4.71)	111.8 (4.40)	65.3 (2.57)	29.2 (1.15)	788.3 (31.04)
Average snowfall cm (inches)	115.1 (45.3)	94.8 (37.3)	84.3 (33.2)	49.1 (19.3)	18.9 (7.4)	4.6 (1.8)	0.0 (0.0)	0.0 (0.0)	0.2 (0.1)	14.1 (5.6)	51.4 (20.2)	111.3 (43.8)	543.7 (214.1)
Average precipitation days (≥ 0.2 mm)	19.4	16.6	17.5	15.7	15.6	16.9	17.2	15.3	15.4	17.7	17.9	21.2	206.5
Average rainy days (≥ 0.2 mm)	2.2	2.1	4.7	8.0	11.8	16.5	17.2	15.3	15.4	15.6	9.2	4.9	122.9
Average snowy days (≥ 0.2 cm)	18.8	15.7	14.9	10.3	5.5	1.4	0.0	0.0	0.2	4.5	11.9	19.7	102.7

== Transportation ==
The town is at the end of the Great Northern Peninsula Highway, and is served by St. Anthony Airport.

== Attractions ==
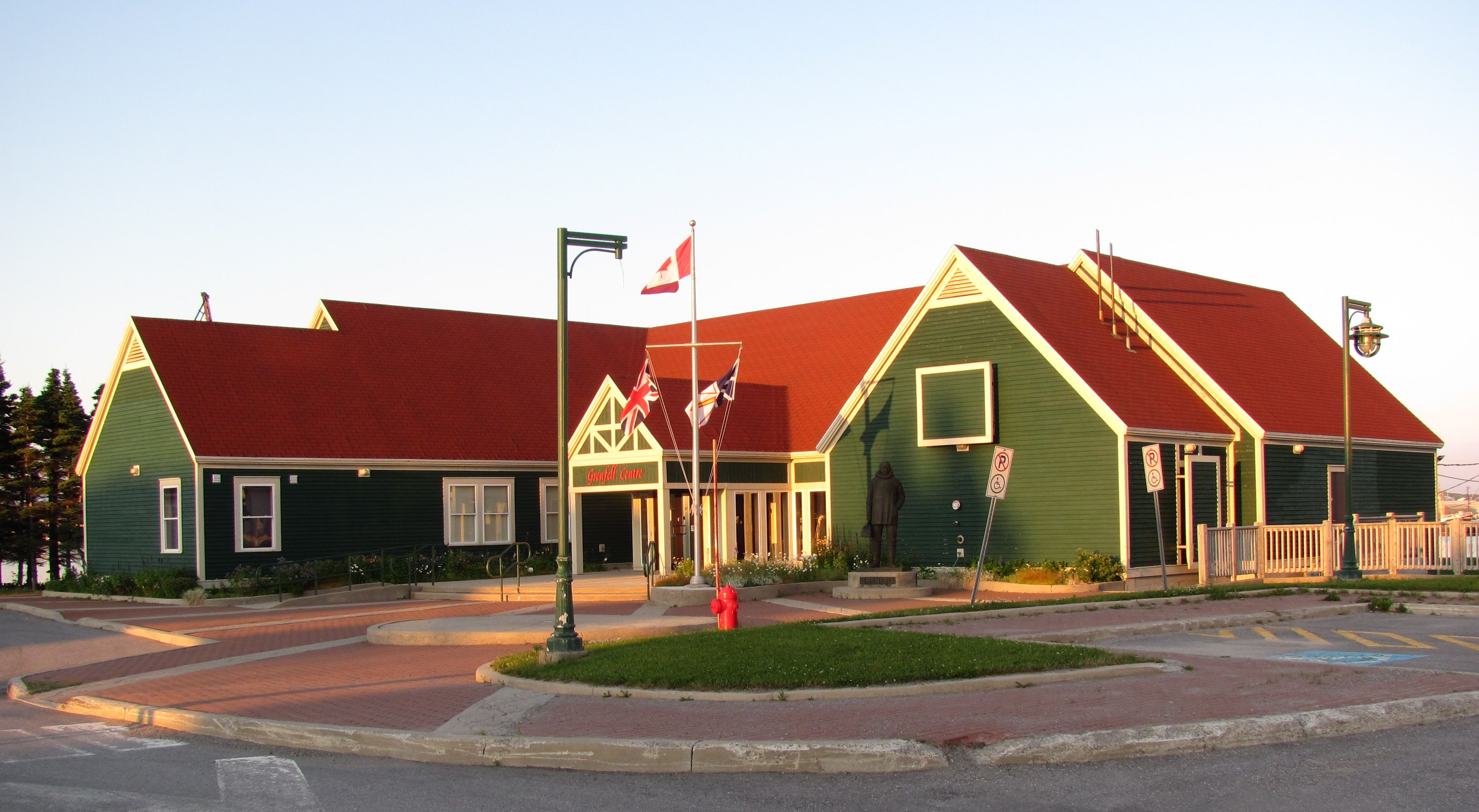
Grenfell Centre

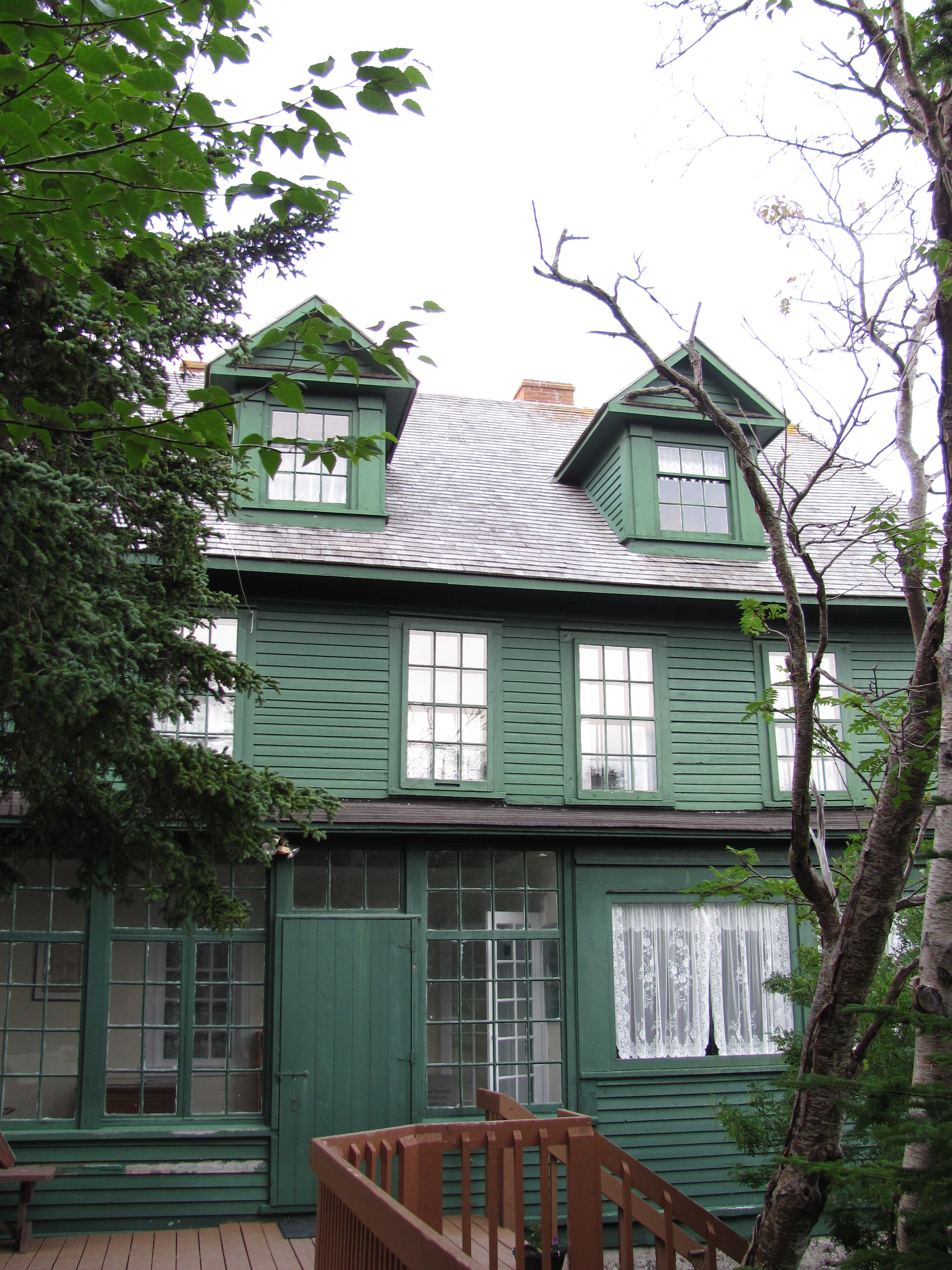
Grenfell Museum

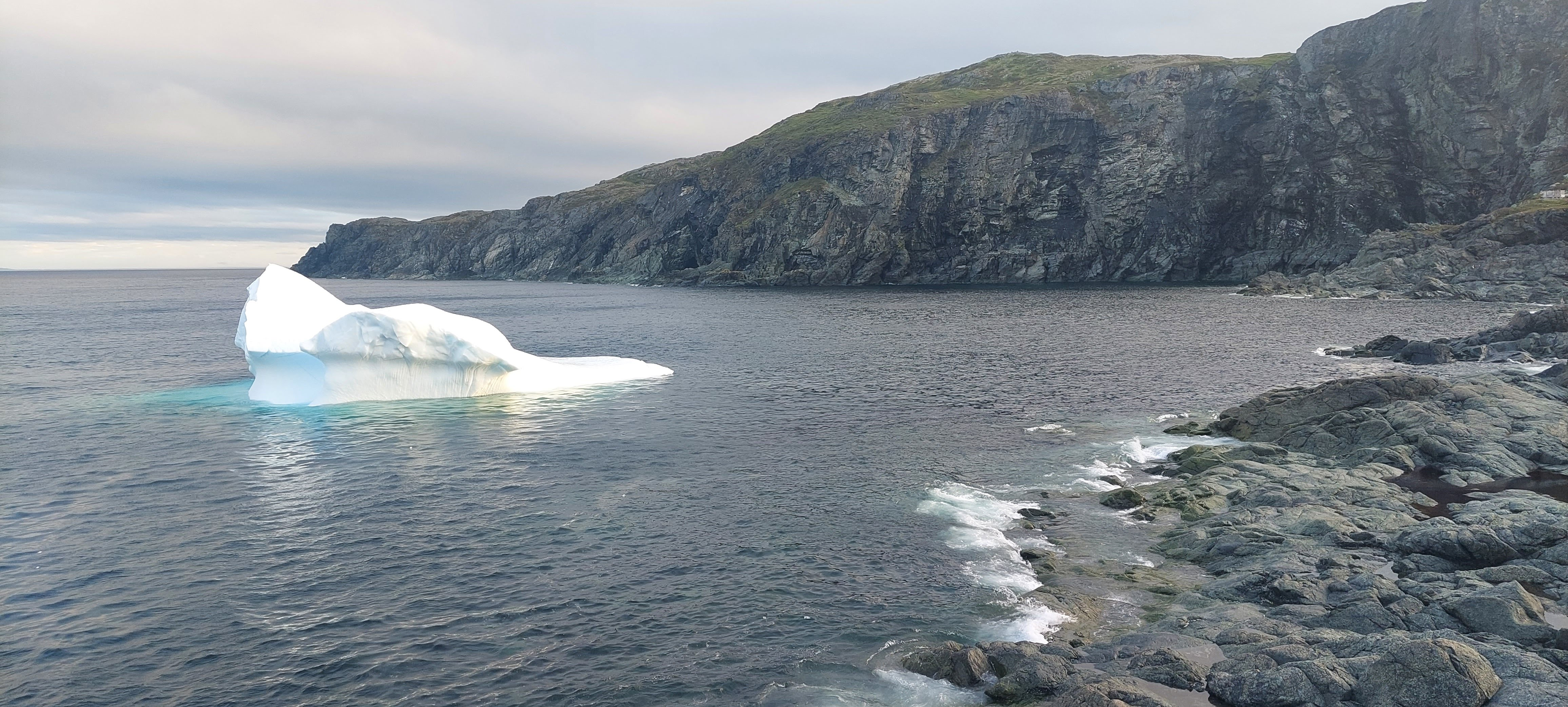
Iceberg at the Fishing Point in the town of Saint Anthony, NL

- St. Anthony a popular tourist destination known for its whale watching.

Dr. Wilfred Grenfell's work in St. Anthony is commemorated by several historic sites and museums, including:

- Grenfell House Museum: Built between 1909 and 1910, it was the home of Dr. Grenfell, his wife Anne, and their three children. After Grenfell's retirement to Vermont, the house became a residence for mission workers. It opened as a museum in 1981.
- Grenfell Interpretation Centre: Interprets the life and times of Dr. Wilfred Grenfell through a gallery of interpretative paneling and displays. The centre is designed to be self touring and to provide a more modern interpretative experience for visitors.
- Tea House Hill: A 20-minute walking trail with interpretative panels and seating along the route. The trail leads to the top of the hill where Dr. Grenfell, his wife and other colleagues' ashes are buried.
- Fishing Point: Experience hiking, fine dining, whale and iceberg viewing in the rugged landscape of Northern Newfoundland.

Other attractions include:

- The Rotunda: A display of ceramic murals depicting the culture and history of the people of Newfoundland and Labrador. The mural was created by the acclaimed sculptor Jordi Bonet.
- Dockhouse Museum: which currently is not in operation, Demonstrated to visitors how vessels of all sizes were pulled out of the water for repairs in the late 1920s.
- L'Anse aux Meadows: A Norse village briefly inhabited around 1000 AD. The site was recognized as one of the world's major archaeological properties and is designated a UNESCO World Heritage Site in 1978.
- St. Mein Bay

== Notable people ==
- Krista Howell, Former MHA and former mayor
- Gavin Tucker, Mixed Martial Arts fighter
- Andrea Barbour, MHA and Tiktoker

== In popular culture ==
St. Anthony appears as a playable area in the 2014 videogame Assassin's Creed Rogue.

== See also ==
- L'Anse aux Meadows
- Newfoundland and Labrador Route 430
- Newfoundland-Labrador fixed link
- List of cities and towns in Newfoundland and Labrador
