= May 2013 in sports =

<<	May 2013					>>
Su	Mo	Tu	We	Th	Fr	Sa
			1	2	3	4
5	6	7	8	9	10	11
12	13	14	15	16	17	18
19	20	21	22	23	24	25
26	27	28	29	30	31
Sports

This list shows notable sports-related deaths, events, and outcomes that occurred in May of 2013.

== Days of the month ==
=== May 31, 2013 (Friday) ===
==== Football (soccer) ====
- Coupe de France Final in Saint Denis: – Bordeaux

=== May 30, 2013 (Thursday) ===
==== Basketball ====
- NBA Playoffs (all series best-of-7; seeds in parentheses):
  - Eastern Conference Finals:
    - Game 5 in Miami: (1) Miami Heat 90, (4) Indiana Pacers 79. Miami leads series, 3–2.

==== Football (soccer) ====
- Copa Libertadores Quarterfinals, second leg (first leg score in parentheses): Atlético Mineiro (Brazil) – (2–2) (Mexico) Tijuana
- Austrian Cup Final in Vienna: Pasching – Austria Wien

==== Tennis ====
- French Open in Paris, France, day 5:
  - Men's singles, second round:
    - Novak Djokovic (SRB) – [1] Guido Pella (ARG)
    - Richard Gasquet (FRA) – [7] Michał Przysiężny (POL) [Q]
    - Grigor Dimitrov (BUL) [26] – Lucas Pouille (FRA) [WC]
    - Philipp Kohlschreiber (GER) [16] – Lu Yen-hsun (TPE)
    - Tommy Haas (GER) [12] – Jack Sock (USA) [Q]
    - John Isner (USA) [19] – Ryan Harrison (USA)
    - Mikhail Youzhny (RUS) [29] – Federico Delbonis (ARG)
    - Janko Tipsarević (SRB) [8] – Fernando Verdasco (ESP)
    - Rafael Nadal (ESP) [3] – Martin Kližan (SVK)
    - Fabio Fognini (ITA) [27] – Lukáš Rosol (CZE)
    - Benoît Paire (FRA) [24] – Łukasz Kubot (POL)
    - Kei Nishikori (JPN) [13] – Grega Žemlja (SLO)
    - Stanislas Wawrinka (SWI) [9] – Horacio Zeballos (ARG)
    - Jerzy Janowicz (POL) [21] – Robin Haase (NED)
    - Richard Gasquet (FRA) [7] – Michał Przysiężny (POL) [Q]
  - Women¡s Singles, second round:
    - Li Na (CHN) [6] – Bethanie Mattek-Sands (USA)
    - Yaroslava Shvedova (KAZ) [27] – Paula Ormaechea (ARG)
    - Maria Kirilenko (RUS) [12] – Ashleigh Barty (AUS) [WC]
    - Marion Bartoli (FRA) [13] – Mariana Duque (COL) [Q]
    - Kirsten Flipkens (BEL) [21] – Francesca Schiavone (ITA)
    - Alizé Cornet (FRA) [31] – Sílvia Soler Espinosa (ESP)
    - Victoria Azarenka (BLR) [3] – Annika Beck (GER)
    - Petra Kvitová (CZE) [7] – Peng Shuai (CHN)
    - Jelena Janković (SRB) [18] – Garbiñe Muguruza (ESP)
    - Samantha Stosur (AUS) [9] – Kristina Mladenovic (FRA)
    - Dominika Cibulková (SVK) [16] – Marina Erakovic (NZL)
    - Maria Sharapova (RUS) [2] – Eugenie Bouchard (CAN)

=== May 29, 2013 (Wednesday) ===
==== Football (soccer) ====
- Copa Libertadores Quarterfinals, second leg (first leg score in parentheses):
  - **Olimpia** (Paraguay) 2–1 (0–0) (Brazil) Fluminense. Olimpia won on points 4–1.
  - **Newell's Old Boys** (Argentina) 0–0 (0–0) (Argentina) Boca Juniors. Tied on points 2–2, Newell's Old Boys won on penalties (10–9)
- (Slovenia) Slovenian Cup Final in Koper: Celje 0–1 **Maribor**
  - Maribor won the title for the eighth time.
- International friendlies (only top 10 in FIFA World Rankings, ranking in brackets):
  - Ecuador [10] 2–4 Germany [2]
  - England [7] 1–1 Republic of Ireland

==== Ice hockey ====
- Stanley Cup playoffs (all series best-of-7; seeds in parentheses):
  - Western Conference Semifinals:
    - Game 7 in Chicago: (1) **Chicago Blackhawks** 2, (7) Detroit Red Wings 1. Chicago won the series, 4–3

==== Tennis ====
- French Open in Paris, France, day 4 (seeds in square brackets):
  - Men's singles, first round:
    - **Benoît Paire** (FRA) [24] def. Marcos Baghdatis (CYP) 3–6, 7–6 (1), 6–4, 6–4
    - **Janko Tipsarević** (SRB) [8] def. Nicolas Mahut (FRA) [WC] 6–2, 7–6 (4), 6–1
  - Men's singles, second round:
    - **Jo-Wilfried Tsonga** (FRA) [6] def. Jarkko Nieminen (FIN) 7–6 (6), 6–4, 6–3
    - **Milos Raonic** (CAN) [14] def. Michaël Llodra (FRA) 7–5, 3–6, 7–6 (3), 6–2
    - **Roger Federer** (SWI) [2] def. Somdev Devvarman (IND) [Q] 6–2, 6–1, 6–1
    - **Julien Benneteau** (FRA) [30] def. Tobias Kamke (GER) 7–6 (9), 7–5, 5–7, 0–6, 6–4
    - **David Ferrer** (ESP) [4] def. Albert Montañés (ESP) 6–2, 6–1, 6–3
    - **Gilles Simon** (FRA) [15] def. Pablo Cuevas (URU) [PR] 6–7 (2), 6–1, 6–1, 6–1
    - **Nicolás Almagro** (ESP) [11] def. Édouard Roger-Vasselin (FRA) 6–2, 6–4, 6–3
    - **Tommy Robredo** (ESP) [32] def. Igor Sijsling (NED) 6–7 (2), 4–6, 6–3, 6–1, 6–1
    - **Andreas Seppi** (ITA) [20] def. Blaž Kavčič (SLO) 6–0, 7–6 (3), 6–7 (2), 4–6, 6–3
    - **Sam Querrey** (USA) [18] def. Jan Hájek (CZE) 6–4, 7–5, 6–4
    - **Marin Čilić** (CRO) [10] def. Nick Kyrgios (AUS) 6–4, 6–2, 6–2
    - **Jérémy Chardy** (FRA) [25] def. Roberto Bautista Agut (ESP) 6–1, 7–5, 6–4
    - **Kevin Anderson** (RSA) [23] def. Evgeny Donskoy (RUS) 6–7 (8), 6–1, 7–5, 6–2
  - Women's singles, first round:
    - **Victoria Azarenka** (BLR) [3] def. Elena Vesnina (RUS) 6–1, 6–4
    - **Petra Kvitová** (CZE) [7] def. Aravane Rezaï (FRA) [WC] 6–3, 4–6, 6–2
    - **Jamie Hampton** (USA) def. Lucie Šafářová (CZE) [25] 7–6 (5), 3–6, 9–7
    - **Kaia Kanepi** (EST) def. Klára Zakopalová (CZE) [23] 7–6 (3), 6–2
    - **Maria Kirilenko** (RUS) [12] def. Nina Bratchikova (POR) 6–0, 6–1
  - Women's singles, second round:
    - **Serena Williams** (USA) [1] def. Caroline Garcia (FRA) [WC] 6–1, 6–2
    - **Ana Ivanovic** (SRB) [14] def. Mathilde Johansson (FRA) 6–2, 6–2
    - **Agnieszka Radwańska** (POL) [4] def. Mallory Burdette (USA) 6–3, 6–2
    - **Sara Errani** (ITA) [5] def. Yulia Putintseva (KAZ) 6–1, 6–1
    - **Angelique Kerber** (GER) [8] def. Jana Čepelová (SVK) 6–2, 6–2
    - **Varvara Lepchenko** (USA) [29] def. Elina Svitolina (UKR) 7–6 (5), 6–1
    - **Roberta Vinci** (ITA) [15] def. Galina Voskoboeva (KAZ) [Q] 6–4, 4–6, 6–2
    - **Carla Suárez Navarro** (ESP) [20] def. Shelby Rogers (USA) [WC] 3–6, 6–4, 6–4
    - **Sorana Cîrstea** (ROU) [26] def. Johanna Larsson (SWE) 6–1, 6–4
    - **Bojana Jovanovski** (SRB) def. Caroline Wozniacki (DEN) [10] 7–6 (2), 6–3
    - **Petra Cetkovská** (CZE) def. Anastasia Pavlyuchenkova (RUS) [19] 7–5, 2–6, 6–4
    - **Sabine Lisicki** (GER) [32] def. María Teresa Torró Flor (ESP) 6–4, 6–0

=== May 28, 2013 (Tuesday) ===
==== Basketball ====
- NBA Playoffs (all series best-of-7; seeds in parentheses):
  - Eastern Conference Finals:
    - Game 4 in Indiana: (3) Indiana Pacers 99, (1) Miami Heat 92. Series tied, 2–2

==== Football (soccer) ====
- Copa Libertadores Quarterfinals, second leg (first leg score in parentheses): **Santa Fe** (Colombia) 2–0 (3–1) (Peru) Real Garcilaso. Santa Fe won on points 6–0.
- Azerbaijan Cup Final: **Neftchi Baku** 0–0 (5–3 on pen.) Khazar
  - Neftchi Baku won the title for the fifth time.

==== Ice hockey ====
- Stanley Cup playoffs (all series best-of-7; seeds in parentheses):
  - Western Conference Semifinals
    - Game 7 in Los Angeles: (5) **Los Angeles Kings** 2, (6) San Jose Sharks 1. Los Angeles won the series, 4–3

==== Rugby union ====
- IRB Junior World Rugby Trophy in Temuco, Chile, pool stage, match day 1:
  - Pool A:
    - Italy 33–7 Namibia
    - Chile 18–6 Portugal
  - Pool B:
    - Japan 40–20 Uruguay
    - Tonga 6–24 Canada

==== Tennis ====
- French Open in Paris, France, day 3 (seeds in square brackets):
  - Men's singles, first round:
    - **Novak Djokovic** (SRB) [1] def. David Goffin (BEL) 7–6 (5), 6–4, 7–5
    - **Tommy Haas** (GER) [12] def. Guillaume Rufin (FRA) 7–6 (4), 6–1, 6–3
    - **Stanislas Wawrinka** (SWI) [9] def. Thiemo de Bakker (NED) 7–5, 6–3, 6–7 (1), 7–5
    - **Philipp Kohlschreiber** (GER) [16] def. Jiří Veselý (CZE) 7–6 (3), 1–6, 7–5, 6–2
    - **Denis Istomin** (UZB) def. Florian Mayer (GER) [28] 4–6, 6–3, 7–5, ret.
    - **Dmitry Tursunov** (RUS) def. Alexandr Dolgopolov (UKR) [22] 7–6 (7), 6–4, 7–6 (7)
    - **Grigor Dimitrov** (BUL) [26] def. Alejandro Falla (COL) 6–4, 1–0 ret.
    - **Mikhail Youzhny** (RUS) [29] def. Pablo Andújar (ESP) 4–6, 6–4, 6–2, 6–3
  - Women's singles, first round:
    - **Marion Bartoli** (FRA) [13] def. Olga Govortsova (BLR) 7–6 (8), 4–6, 7–5
    - **Alizé Cornet** (FRA) [31] def. Maria João Koehler (POR) 7–5, 6–2
    - **Samantha Stosur** (AUS) [9] def. Kimiko Date-Krumm (JPN) 6–0, 6–2
    - **Jelena Janković** (SRB) [18] def. Daniela Hantuchová (SVK) 6–4, 7–6 (7)
    - **Yaroslava Shvedova** (KAZ) [27] def. CoCo Vandeweghe (USA) 6–0, 3–6, 6–2
    - **Dominika Cibulková** (SVK) def. [16] Lesia Tsurenko (UKR) 6–1, 6–4

=== May 27, 2013 (Monday) ===
==== Basketball ====
- NBA Playoffs:
  - Western Conference Finals:
    - Game 4 in Memphis: (5) Memphis Grizzlies 86, (2) **San Antonio Spurs** 93. San Antonio won the series, 4–0

==== Ice hockey ====
- Stanley Cup playoffs (all series best-of-7; seeds in parentheses):
  - Western Conference Semifinals
    - Game 6 in Detroit: (7) Detroit Red Wings 3, (1) Chicago Blackhawks 4. Series tied, 3–3

==== Tennis ====
- French Open in Paris, France, day 2 (seeds in square brackets):
  - Men's singles, first round:
    - **Rafael Nadal** (ESP) [3] def. Daniel Brands (GER) 4–6, 7–6 (4), 6–4, 6–3
    - **Gaël Monfils** (FRA) [WC] def. Tomáš Berdych (CZE) [5] 7–6 (8), 6–4, 6–7 (3), 6–7 (4), 7–5
    - **Jo-Wilfried Tsonga** (FRA) [6] def. Aljaž Bedene (SLO) 6–2, 6–3, 6–3
    - **Richard Gasquet** (FRA) [7] def. Serhiy Stakhovsky (UKR) 6–1, 6–4, 6–3
    - **Julien Benneteau** (FRA) [30] def. Ričardas Berankis (LIT) 7–6 (5), 6–3, 5–7, 7–6 (5)
    - **John Isner** (USA) [19] def. Carlos Berlocq (ARG) 6–3, 6–4, 6–4
    - **Nicolás Almagro** (ESP) [11] def. Andreas Haider-Maurer (AUT) [LL] 4–6, 6–4, 6–3, 6–3
    - **Jerzy Janowicz** (POL) [21] def. Albert Ramos (ESP) 7–6 (3), 7–5, 6–3
    - **Kei Nishikori** (JPN) [13] def. Jesse Levine (CAN) 6–3, 6–2, 6–0
    - **Feliciano López** (ESP) def. Marcel Granollers (ESP) [31] 7–5, 2–6, 6–4, 4–6, 6–4
    - **Marin Čilić** (CRO) [10] def. Philipp Petzschner (GER) 6–1, 6–2, 6–3
    - **Fabio Fognini** (ITA) [27] def. Andreas Beck (GER) [Q] 6–3, 7–5, 6–3
    - **Tommy Robredo** (ESP) [32] def. Jürgen Zopp (EST) [PR] 6–3, 6–2, 6–1
    - **Daniel Gimeno Traver** (ESP) def. Juan Mónaco (ARG) [17] 4–6, 4–6, 7–6 (4), 6–4, 6–4
  - Women's singles, first round:
    - **Li Na** (CHN) [6] def. Anabel Medina Garrigues (ESP) 6–3, 6–4
    - **Agnieszka Radwańska** (POL) [4] def. Shahar Pe'er (ISR) 6–1, 6–1
    - **Caroline Wozniacki** (DEN) [10] def. Laura Robson (GBR) 6–3, 6–2
    - **Maria Sharapova** (RUS) [2] def. Hsieh Su-wei (TPE) 6–2, 6–1
    - **Roberta Vinci** (ITA) [15] def. Stéphanie Foretz Gacon (FRA) [WC] 6–3, 6–0
    - **Angelique Kerber** (GER) [8] def. Mona Barthel (GER) 7–6 (6), 6–2
    - **Zuzana Kučová** (SVK) [Q] def. Julia Görges (GER) [24] 7–6 (8), 6–0
    - **Carla Suárez Navarro** (ESP) [20] def. Simona Halep (ROU) 3–6, 6–2, 6–2
    - **Varvara Lepchenko** (USA) [3] def. Mirjana Lučić-Baroni (CRO) 6–1, 6–2
    - **Svetlana Kuznetsova** (RUS) def. Ekaterina Makarova (RUS) [22] 6–4, 6–2
    - **Sloane Stephens** (USA) [17] def. Karin Knapp (ITA) 6–2, 7–5
    - **Kirsten Flipkens** (BEL) [21] def. Flavia Pennetta (ITA) [PR] 2–6, 6–4, 6–0
    - **Melanie Oudin** (USA) def. Tamira Paszek (AUT) [28] 6–4, 6–3

=== May 26, 2013 (Sunday) ===
==== Auto racing ====
- Formula One:
  - 2013 Monaco Grand Prix in Monte Carlo, Monaco: (1) Nico Rosberg (GER) (Mercedes) (2) Sebastian Vettel (GER) (Red Bull–Renaul) (3) Mark Webber (AUS) (Red Bull-Renault)
- Sprint Cup Series
  - Coca-Cola 600 in Concord, North Carolina: (1) Kevin Harvick (USA) (Richard Childress Racing, Chevrolet) (2) Kasey Kahne (USA) (Hendrick Motorsports, Chevrolet) (3) Kurt Busch (USA) (Furniture Row Racing, Chevrolet)
- IndyCar Series:
  - 97th Indianapolis 500 Mile Race in Speedway, Indiana: (1) Tony Kanaan (BRA) (KV Racing Technology) (2) Carlos Muñoz (COL) (Andretti Autosport) (3) Ryan Hunter-Reay (USA) (Andretti Autosport)
    - Kanaan won his first Indianapolis 500 race after his 12th attempt.

==== Basketball ====
- NBA Playoffs (all series best-of-7; seeds in parentheses):
  - Eastern Conference Finals:
    - Game 3 in Indiana: (3) Indiana Pacers 96, (1) Miami Heat 114. Miami led the series, 2–1.

==== Cycling ====
- Grand Tours:
  - Giro d'Italia, Stage 21: (gold) Mark Cavendish (GBR) (Omega Pharma–Quick-Step) 5h 30' 09" (silver) Sacha Modolo (ITA) (Bardiani Valvole–CSF Inox) s.t. (bronze) Elia Viviani (ITA) (Cannondale) s.t.
    - Final Classification: (1) Vincenzo Nibali (ITA) (Astana) 84h 53' 28" (2) Rigoberto Urán (COL) (Team Sky) + 4' 43" (3) Cadel Evans (AUS) (BMC Racing Team) + 5' 52"
      - Nibali won his first Giro d'Italia and his second Grand Tour.

==== Football (soccer) ====
- (Andorra) Copa Constitució Final: **UE Santa Coloma** 3–2 (a.e.t.) UE Sant Julià
  - UE Santa Coloma won the title for the first time.
- (Belarus) Belarusian Cup Final in Zhodino: **FC Minsk** 1–1 (4–1 in pen.) Dinamo Minsk
  - Minsk won the title for the first time.
- (Italy) Coppa Italia Final in Rome: **Lazio** 1–0 Roma
  - Lazio won the title for the sixth time.
- (Moldova) Moldovan Cup Final: Veris 2–2 (2–4 in pen.) **FC Tiraspol**
  - FC Tiraspol won the title for the third time.
- Taça de Portugal Final in Oeiras: **Vitória de Guimarães** 2–1 Benfica
  - Vitória de Guimarães won the title for the first time.
- (Scotland) Scottish Cup Final in Glasgow: Hibernian 0–3 **Celtic**
  - Celtic won the title for the 36th time.
- (Sweden) Svenska Cup Final in Solna: Djurgårdens IF 1–1 (1–3 in pen.) **IFK Göteborg**
  - IFK Göteborg won the title for the sixth time.

==== Golf ====
- PGA Tour:
  - Crowne Plaza Invitational at Colonial in Fort Worth, Texas:
    - Winner: Boo Weekley (USA) 266 (−14)
      - Weekley won his third PGA Tour title.
- European Tour:
  - BMW PGA Championship in Virginia Water, England:
    - Winner: Matteo Manassero (ITA) 278 (−10)
      - Manassero won his fourth European Tour title.
- LPGA Tour:
  - Pure Silk-Bahamas LPGA Classic in Bahamas:
    - Winner: Ilhee Lee (KOR) 126 (−93)
      - Lee won his first LPGA Tour title.

==== Ice hockey ====
- Stanley Cup playoffs (all series best-of-7; seeds in parentheses):
  - Western Conference Semifinals:
    - Game 6 in San Jose: (6) San Jose Sharks 2, (5) Los Angeles Sharks 1. Series tied, 3–3.

==== Tennis ====
- French Open in Paris, France, day 1 (seeds in square brackets):
  - Men's singles, first round:
    - **Roger Federer** (SWI) [2] def. Pablo Carreño (ESP) [Q] 6–2, 6–2, 6–3
    - **Gilles Simon** (FRA) [15] def. Lleyton Hewitt (AUS) 3–6, 1–6, 6–4, 6–1, 7–5
    - **David Ferrer** (ESP) [4] def. Marinko Matosevic (AUS) 6–4, 6–3, 6–4
    - **Milos Raonic** (CAN) [14] def. Xavier Malisse (BEL) 6–2, 6–1, 4–6, 6–4
    - **Jérémy Chardy** (FRA) [25] def. Benjamin Becker (GER) 6–4, 6–2, 7–5
    - **Kevin Anderson** (RSA) [23] def. Illya Marchenko (UKR) 6–3, 7–5, 6–4
    - **Andreas Seppi** (ITA) [20] def. Leonardo Mayer (ARG) 6–7 (4), 6–4, 6–3, 6–7 (2), 6–4
    - **Sam Querrey** (USA) [18] def. Lukáš Lacko (SVK) 6–3, 6–4, 6–4
  - Women's singles, first round:
    - **Ana Ivanovic** (SRB) [14] def. Petra Martić (CRO) 6–1, 3–6, 6–3
    - **Serena Williams** (USA) [1] def. Anna Tatishvili (GEO) 6–0, 6–1
    - **Sara Errani** (ITA) [5] def. Arantxa Rus (NED) 6–1, 6–2
    - **Urszula Radwańska** (POL) def. Venus Williams (USA) [30] 7–6 (5), 6–7 (4), 6–4
    - **Sabine Lisicki** (GER) [32] def. Sofia Arvidsson (SWE) 6–3, 6–4
    - **Monica Puig** (PRI) def. Nadia Petrova (RUS) [11] 3–6, 7–5, 6–4
    - **Anastasia Pavlyuchenkova** (RUS) [19] def. Andrea Hlaváčková (CZE) 4–6, 7–6 (5), 6–4
    - **Sorana Cîrstea** (ROU) [23] def. Kiki Bertens (NED) 5–7, 7–5, 6–2

=== May 25, 2013 (Saturday) ===
==== Athletics ====
- IAAF Diamond League:
  - Adidas Grand Prix in New York City, United States:
    - Men:
      - 100 m: Tyson Gay (USA) 10.02
      - 800 m: David Rudisha (KEN) 1:45.14
      - 5000 m: Hagos Gebrhiwet (ETH) 13:10.03 WL
      - 110 m h: Ryan Brathwaite (BAR) 13.19 SB
      - 400 m h: Michael Tinsley (USA) 48.43 SB
      - Triple jump: Benjamin Compaoré (FRA) 16.45
      - Shot put: Ryan Whiting (USA) 21.27
    - Women:
      - 200 m: Veronica Campbell Brown (JAM) 22.53 SB
      - 400 m: Amantle Montsho (BOT) 49.91 MR
      - 1500 m: Abeba Aregawi (SWE) 4:03.69
      - 3000 m st: Lydiah Chepkurui (KEN) 9:30.82
      - Long jump: Janay DeLoach (USA) 6.79 MR
      - High jump: Blanka Vlašić (CRO) 1.94 =MR
      - Pole vault: Jenn Suhr (USA) 4.63
      - Discus: Sandra Perković (CRO) 68.48 WL, MR
      - Javelin: Christina Obergföll (GER) 65.33 SB

==== Auto racing ====
- Nationwide Series:
  - History 300 in Concord, North Carolina: (1) Kyle Busch (USA) (Toyota, Joe Gibbs Racing) (2) Kasey Kahne (USA) (Chevrolet, JR Motorsports) (3) Joey Logano (USA) (Ford, Penske Racing)
    - Drivers' championship standings (after 10 of 33 races): (1) Regan Smith (USA) (Chevrolet, JR Motorsports) 376 points (2) Sam Hornish Jr. (USA) (Ford, Penske Racing) 347 (3) Elliott Sadler (USA) (Toyota, Joe Gibbs Racing) 331

==== Basketball ====
- NBA Playoffs:
  - Western Conference Finals:
    - Game 3 in Memphis: (5) Memphis Grizzlies 93, (2) San Antonio Spurs 104. San Antonio led the series, 3–0

==== Cycling ====
- Grand Tours:
  - Giro d'Italia, Stage 20: (gold) Vincenzo Nibali (ITA) (Astana) 5h 27' 41" (silver) Fabio Duarte (COL) (Colombia) + 17" (bronze) Rigoberto Urán (COL) (Team Sky) + 19"

==== Football (soccer) ====
- UEFA Champions League Final: Borussia Dortmund (Germany) 1–2 (Germany) **Bayern Munich**
  - Bayern Munich won the title for the fifth time.

==== Tennis ====
- ATP World Tour:
  - Power Horse Cup in Düsseldorf, Germany:
    - Final: **Juan Mónaco** (ARG) def. Jarkko Nieminen (FIN) 6–4, 6–3
      - Monaco won the eighth title of his career.
  - Open de Nice Côte d'Azur in Nice, France:
    - Final: **Albert Montañés** (ESP) def. Gaël Monfils (FRA) 6–0, 7–6(3).
      - Montañés won the sixth title of his career.
- WTA Tour:
  - Brussels Open in Brussels, Belgium:
    - Final: **Kaia Kanepi** (EST) def. Peng Shuai (CHN) 6–2, 7–5
      - Kanepi won the fourth title of her career.
  - Internationaux de Strasbourg in Strasbourg, France:
    - Final: **Alizé Cornet** (FRA) def. Lucie Hradecká (CZE) 7–6(4), 6–0
      - Cornet won the third title of her career.

==== Ice hockey ====
- Stanley Cup playoffs (all series best-of-7; seeds in parentheses):
  - Eastern Conference Semifinals:
    - Game 5 in Boston: (4) **Boston Bruins** 3, (6) New York Rangers 1. Boston won series, 4–1
  - Western Conference Semifinals:
    - Game 5 in Chicago: (1) Chicago Blackhawks 4, (7) Detroit Red Wings 1. Detroit lead series, 3–2.

=== May 24, 2013 (Friday) ===
==== Basketball ====
- NBA Playoffs (all series best-of-7; seeds in parentheses):
  - Eastern Conference Finals:
    - Game 2 in Miami: (1) Miami Heat 93, (4) Indiana Pacers 97. Series tied, 1–1

==== Cycling ====
- Grand Tours:
  - Giro d'Italia, Stage 19: Stage cancelled due to weather conditions.

==== Ice hockey ====
- Stanley Cup playoffs (all series best-of-7; seeds in parentheses):
  - Eastern Conference Semifinals:
    - Game 5 in Pittsburgh: (1) **Pittsburgh Penguins** 6, (7) Ottawa Senators 2. Pittsburgh won the series, 4–1

=== May 23, 2013 (Thursday) ===
==== Cycling ====
- Grand Tours:
  - Giro d'Italia, Stage 18: (gold) Vincenzo Nibali (ITA) (Astana) 44' 29" (silver) Samuel Sánchez (ESP) (Euskaltel–Euskadi) + 58" (bronze) Damiano Caruso (ITA) (Cannondale) + 1' 20"

==== Football (soccer) ====
- UEFA Women's Champions League Final: **Wolfsburg** (Germany) 1–0 (France) Lyon
  - Wolfsburg won the title for the first time.
- Copa Libertadores Quarterfinals, first leg:
  - Tijuana (Mexico) 2–2 (Brazil) Atlético Mineiro
  - Boca Juniors (Argentina) 0–0 (Argentina) Newell's Old Boys

==== Ice hockey ====
- Stanley Cup playoffs (all series best-of-7; seeds in parentheses):
  - Eastern Conference Semifinals:
    - Game 4 in New York: (6) New York Rangers 4, (4) Boston Bruins 3. Boston leads series 3–1
  - Western Conference Semifinals
    - Game 4 in Detroit: (7) Detroit Red Wings 2, (1) Chicago Blackhawks 0. Detroit leads series 3–1
    - Game 5 in Los Angeles: (5) Los Angeles Kings 3, (6) San Jose Sharks 2. Los Angeles led the series 3–2

=== May 22, 2013 (Wednesday) ===
==== Basketball ====
- NBA Playoffs (all series best-of-7; seeds in parentheses):
  - Eastern Conference Finals:
    - Game 1 in Miami: (1) Miami Heat 103, (3) Indiana Pacers 102. Miami led the series 1–0

==== Cycling ====
- Grand Tours:
  - Giro d'Italia, Stage 17: (gold) Giovanni Visconti (ITA) (Movistar Team) 5h 15' 34" (silver) Ramūnas Navardauskas (LIT) (Garmin–Sharp) + 19" (bronze) Luka Mezgec (SLO) (Argos–Shimano) + 19"

==== Football (soccer) ====
- Copa Libertadores Quarterfinals, first leg:
  - Real Garcilaso (Peru) 1–3 (Colombia) Santa Fe
  - Fluminense (Brazil) 0–0 (Paraguay) Olimpia
- AFC Champions League Round of 16, second leg (first leg score in parentheses):
  - **Kashiwa Reysol** (Japan) 3–2 (2–0) (South Korea) Jeonbuk Hyundai Motors. Kashiwa Reysol won 5–2 on aggregate.
  - **Guangzhou Evergrande** (China) 3–0 (2–1) (Australia) Central Coast Mariners. Guangzhou Evergrande won 5–1 on aggregate.
  - **Lekhwiya** (Qatar) 2–2 (1–0) (Saudi Arabia) Al-Hilal. Lekhwiya won 3–2 on aggregate.
  - **Esteghlal** (Iran) 0–0 (4–2) (United Arab Emirates) Al-Shabab Al-Arabi. Esteghlal won 4–2 on aggregate.
- (Croatia) Croatian Cup Final, second leg (first leg score in parentheses): Lokomotiva 3–3 (1–2) **Hajduk Split**. Hajduk Split won 5–4 on aggregate.
  - Hajduk Split won the Cup for the sixth time.
- (Cyprus) Cypriot Cup Final in Limassol: AEL Limassol 1–2 (a.e.t.) **Apollon Limassol**
  - Apollon Limassol won the Cup for the seventh time.
- (Malta) Maltese FA Trophy Final in Ta' Qali: Qormi 1–3 **Hibernians**
  - The Hibernians won the Cup for the tenth time.
- (Turkey) Turkish Cup Final in Ankara: **Fenerbahçe** 1–0 Trabzonspor
  - Fenerbahçe won the Cup for the sixth time.
- (Ukraine) Ukrainian Cup Final in Kharkiv: **Shakhtar Donetsk** 3–0 Chornomorets
  - Shakhtar Donetsk won the Cup for the ninth time.
- (Montenegro) Montenegrin Cup Final in Podgorica: **Budućnost** 1–0 Čelik
  - Budućnost won the Cup for the first time.

==== Ice hockey ====
- Stanley Cup playoffs (all series best-of-7; seeds in parentheses):
  - Eastern Conference Semifinals:
    - Game 4 in Ottawa: (7) Ottawa Senators 3, (1) Pittsburgh Penguins 7. Pittsburgh led the series 3–1

=== May 21, 2013 (Tuesday) ===
==== Basketball ====
- NBA Playoffs:
  - Western Conference Finals:
    - Game 2 in San Antonio: (2) San Antonio Spurs 93, (5) Memphis Grizzlies 89. San Antonio led the series, 2–0.

==== Cycling ====
- Grand Tours:
  - Giro d'Italia, Stage 16: (gold) Beñat Intxausti (ESP) (Movistar Team) 5h 52' 48" (silver) Tanel Kangert (EST) (Astana) s.t. (bronze) Przemysław Niemiec (POL) (Lampre–Merida) s.t.

==== Football (soccer) ====
- AFC Champions League Round of 16, second leg (first leg score in parentheses):
  - **FC Seoul** (South Korea) 3–1 (0–0) (China) Beijing Guoan. FC Seoul won 3–1 on aggregate.
  - Bunyodkor (Uzbekistan) 0–0 (1–2) (Thailand) **Buriram United**. Buriram United won 2–1 on aggregate.
  - **Al-Ahli** (Saudi Arabia) 2–0 (1–1) (Qatar) El Jaish. Al-Ahli won 3–1 on aggregate.
  - **Al-Shabab** (Saudi Arabia) 3–0 (2–1) (Qatar) Al-Gharafa. Al-Shabab won 5–1 on aggregate.

==== Ice hockey ====
- Stanley Cup playoffs (all series best-of-7; seeds in parentheses):
  - Eastern Conference Semifinals:
    - Game 3 in New York: New York Rangers 1, (4) Boston Bruins 2. Boston leads series, 3–0.
  - Western Conference Semifinals:
    - Game 4 in Los Angeles: (6) San Jose Sharks 2, (5) Los Angeles Sharks 1. Series tied, 2–2.

=== May 20, 2013 (Monday) ===
==== Football (soccer) ====
- (Switzerland) Swiss Cup Final in Bern: FC Basel 1–1 (3–4 in pen.) **Grasshopper Zürich**
  - Grasshopper Zürich won their 18th Cup title.

==== Ice hockey ====
- Stanley Cup playoffs (all series best-of-7; seeds in parentheses):
  - Western Conference Semifinals
    - Game 3 in Detroit: (7) Detroit Red Wings 3, (1) Chicago Blackhawks 1. Detroit led the series, 2–1.

=== May 19, 2013 (Sunday) ===
==== Auto racing ====
- V8 Supercars:
  - Austin 400 in Austin, Texas, United States: (1) Jamie Whincup (AUS) (Holden, Red Bull Racing Australia) (2) Craig Lowndes (AUS) (Holden, Red Bull Racing Australia) (3) Fabian Coulthard (NZL) (Holden, Lockwood Racing)
    - Standings (after 5 of 14 races): (1) Whincup 1247 points (2) Lowndes 1105 8 (3) Will Davison (AUS) (Ford, Ford Performance Racing) 1029

==== Basketball ====
- NBA Playoffs:
  - Western Conference Finals:
    - Game 1 in San Antonio: (2) San Antonio Spurs 105, (5) Memphis Grizzlies 83. San Antonio led the series, 1–0

==== Cycling ====
- Grand Tours:
  - Giro d'Italia, Stage 15: (gold) Giovanni Visconti (ITA) (Movistar Team) 4h 40' 48" (silver) Carlos Betancur (COL) (Ag2r–La Mondiale) + 42" (bronze) Przemysław Niemiec (POL) (Lampre–Merida) + 42"

==== Football (soccer) ====
- OFC Champions League Final: Waitakere United (New Zealand) 1–2 (New Zealand) **Auckland City**
  - Auckland City won the title for the third time in a row and fifth overall and qualified for the 2013 FIFA Club World Cup.

==== Golf ====
- PGA Tour:
  - HP Byron Nelson Championship in Irving, Texas:
    - Winner: Bae Sang-moon (KOR) 267 (−13)
      - Bae won his first PGA Tour title.
- European Tour:
  - Volvo World Match Play Championship in Kavarna, Bulgaria:
    - Winner: Graeme McDowell (NIR) 2&1
      - McDowell won his eighth European Tour title.
  - Madeira Islands Open in Madeira, Portugal:
    - Winner: Peter Uihlein (USA) 273 (−15)
      - Uihlein won his first European Tour title.
- LPGA Tour:
  - Mobile Bay LPGA Classic in Mobile, Alabama, United States:
    - Winner: Jennifer Johnson (USA) 267 (−21)
      - Johnson won her first LPGA Tour title.

==== Ice Hockey ====
- World Championship:
  - Bronze medal game: Finland 2–3 (GWS) **United States**
  - Final: Switzerland 1–5 **Sweden**
    - Sweden won the Championship for the ninth time.
- Stanley Cup playoffs (all series best-of-7; seeds in parentheses):
  - Eastern Conference Semifinals:
    - Game 3 in Ottawa: (7) Ottawa Senators 2, (1) Pittsburgh Penguins 1. Pittsburgh leads series, 2–1
    - Game 2 in Boston: (4) Boston Bruins 5, (6) New York Rangers 2. Boston leads series, 2–0.

==== Motorcycle racing ====
- Moto GP:
  - French Grand Prix in Le Mans:
    - Moto GP: (1) Dani Pedrosa (ESP) (Honda) (2) Cal Crutchlow (GBR) (Yamaha) (3) Marc Márquez (ESP) (Honda)
    - Moto2: (1) Scott Redding (GBR) (Kalex) (2) Mika Kallio (FIN) (Kalex) (3) Xavier Siméon (ESP) (Kalex)
    - Moto3: (1) Maverick Viñales (ESP) (KTM) (2) Álex Rins (ESP) (KTM) (3) Luis Salom (ESP) (KTM)

==== Tennis ====
- ATP World Tour:
  - Internazionali BNL d'Italia in Rome:
    - Final: **Rafael Nadal** (ESP) def. Roger Federer (SWI) 6–1, 6–3.
      - Nadal won his sixth title of the year, seventh Italian Open title, 24th Masters 1000 title and 56th title overall.
- WTA Tour:
  - Internazionali BNL d'Italia in Rome:
    - Final: **Serena Williams** (USA) def. Victoria Azarenka (BLR) 6–1, 6–3.
      - Williams won her fifth title of the year, second Italian Open title, 15th Premier title and her 51st title overall.

=== May 18, 2013 (Saturday) ===
==== Athletics ====
- IAAF Diamond League:
  - Shanghai Golden Grand Prix in Shanghai, China:
    - Men:
      - 200 m: Warren Weir (JAM) 20.18
      - 400 m: Kirani James (GRN) 44.02 WL, =MR
      - 1500 m: Asbel Kiprop (KEN) 3:32.39
      - 110 m h: Jason Richardson (USA) 13.23 SB
      - 3000 m st: Conseslus Kipruto (KEN) 8:01.16 WL, MR, PB
      - Long jump: Li Jinzhe (CHN) 8.34 WL, PB
      - Hugh jump: Mutaz Essa Barshim (QAT) 2.33 =MR, SB
      - Discus: Piotr Małachowski (POL) 67.34 SB
      - Javelin: Tero Pitkämäki (FIN) 87.60 WL, MR
    - Women:
      - 100 m: Shelly-Ann Fraser-Pryce (JAM) 10.93 WL
      - 800 m: Francine Niyonsaba (BDI) 2:00.33 WL
      - 5000 m: Genzebe Dibaba (ETH) 14:45.92 WL
      - 400 m h: Zuzana Hejnová (CZE) 53.79 WL
      - Triple jump: Caterine Ibargüen (COL) 14.69 WL
      - Pole vault: Yelena Isinbayeva (RUS) 4.70 SB
      - Shot put: Christina Schwanitz (GER) 20.20 PB

==== Auto racing ====
- Sprint Cup Series
  - NASCAR Sprint All-Star Race in Concord, North Carolina: (1) Jimmie Johnson (USA) (Chevrolet, Hendrick Motorsports) (2) Joey Logano (USA) (Ford, Penske Racing) (3) Kyle Busch (USA) (Toyota, Joe Gibbs Racing)

==== Basketball ====
- NBA Playoffs (all series best-of-7; seeds in parentheses):
  - Eastern Conference semifinals:
    - Game 6 in Indiana: (3) **Indiana Pacers** 106, New York Knicks 99. Indiana won the series, 4–2

==== Cycling ====
- Grand Tours:
  - Giro d'Italia, Stage 14: (gold) Mauro Santambrogio (ITA) (Vini Fantini–Selle Italia) 4h 42' 55" (silver) Vincenzo Nibali (ITA) (Astana) s.t. (bronze) Carlos Betancur (COL) (Ag2r–La Mondiale) +9"

==== Football (soccer) ====
- (Estonia) Estonian Cup Final in Tallinn: Nõmme Kalju 1–3 **Flora**
  - Flora won their sixth Cup title.
- (Latvia) Latvian Cup Final in Riga: **Ventspils** 2–1 (a.e.t.) Liepājas Metalurgs
  - Ventspils won their fifth Cup title.

==== Horse Racing ====
- 2013 Triple Crown
  - 2013 Preakness Stakes
    - Oxbow is the upset winner in the middle jewel of the annual series. Kentucky Derby winner Orb's fourth-place finish once again extends horse racing's longest losing streak by another year on the 35th Anniversary of Affirmed's victory as the last winner of sports' most elusive championship.

==== Ice Hockey ====
- World Championship Semifinals:
  - Finland 0–3 **Sweden**
  - **Switzerland** 3–0 United States
- Stanley Cup playoffs (all series best-of-7; seeds in parentheses):
  - Western Conference Semifinals:
    - Game 2 in Chicago: (1) Chicago Blackhawks 1, (7) Detroit Red Wings 4. Series tied, 1–1
  - Western Conference Semifinals:
    - Game 3 in Los Angeles: (6) San Jose Sharks 2, (5) Los Angeles Sharks 1. Los Angeles leads series, 2–1

=== May 17, 2013 (Friday) ===
==== Cycling ====
- Grand Tours:
  - Giro d'Italia, Stage 13: (gold) Mark Cavendish (GBR) (Omega Pharma–Quick-Step) 6h 09' 55" (silver) Giacomo Nizzolo (ITA) (RadioShack–Leopard) s.t. (bronze) Luka Mezgec (SLO) (Argos–Shimano) s.t.

==== Football (soccer) ====
- UEFA European Under-17 Championship Final: Italy 0–0 (4–5 in pen.) **Russia**
  - Russia won their third title.
- (Spain) Copa del Rey Final in Madrid: Real Madrid 1–2 **Atlético Madrid**
  - Atlético Madrid won their tenth Cup title.
- (Albania) Albanian Cup Final in Tirana: **Laçi** 1–0 Bylis Ballsh
  - Laçi won their first Cup title.
- (Czech Republic) Czech Cup Final in Chomutov: **FK Baumit Jablonec** 2–2 (5–4 in pen.) FK Mladá Boleslav
  - FK Baumit Jablonec won their second Cup title.

==== Ice hockey ====
- Stanley Cup playoffs (all series best-of-7; seeds in parentheses):
  - Eastern Conference Semifinals:
    - Game 2 in Pittsburgh: (1) Pittsburgh Penguins 4, (7) Ottawa Senators 3. Pittsburgh leads series 2–0.

=== May 16, 2013 (Thursday) ===
==== Basketball ====
- NBA Playoffs (all series best-of-7; seeds in parentheses):
  - Eastern Conference semifinals:
    - Game 5 in New York: (2) New York Knicks 85, (3) Indiana Pacers 75. Indiana leads series, 3–2
  - Western Conference semifinals:
    - Game 6 in Oakland: (6) Golden State Warriors 82, (2) **San Antonio Spurs** 94. San Antonio won the series, 4–2

==== Cycling ====
- Grand Tours:
  - Giro d'Italia, Stage 12: (gold) Mark Cavendish (GBR) (Omega Pharma–Quick-Step) 3h 01' 47" (silver) Nacer Bouhanni (FRA) (FDJ) s.t. (bronze) Luka Mezgec (SLO) (Argos–Shimano) s.t.

==== Football (soccer) ====
- Copa Libertadores Round of 16, second leg (first leg score in parentheses):
  - **Santa Fe** (Colombia) 1–0 (1–2) (Brazil) Grêmio. Tied on points 3–3, Santa Fe won on away goals.
  - **Olimpia** (Paraguay) 2–0 (1–2) (Argentina) Tigre. Tied on points 3–3, Olimpia won on goal difference.

==== Ice Hockey ====
- World Championship Quarter-finals:
  - Russia 3–8 **United States**
  - **Switzerland** 2–1 Czech Republic
  - **Finland** 4–3 Slovakia
  - Canada 2–3 (GWS) **Sweden**
- Stanley Cup playoffs (all series best-of-7; seeds in parentheses):
  - Eastern Conference Semifinals:
    - Game 1 in Boston: (4) Boston Bruins 3, (6) New York Rangers 2. Boston leads series, 1–0.
  - Western Conference Semifinals:
    - Game 2 in Los Angeles: (5) Los Angeles Kings 4, (6) San Jose Sharks 3. Los Angeles leads series, 2–0

=== May 15, 2013 (Wednesday) ===
==== Basketball ====
- NBA Playoffs (all series best-of-7; seeds in parentheses):
  - Eastern Conference semifinals:
    - Game 5 in Miami: (1) **Miami Heat** 94, (5) Chicago Bulls 91. Miami won the series, 4–1
  - Western Conference semifinals:
    - Game 5 in Oklahoma City: (1) Oklahoma City 84, (5) **Memphis Grizzlies** 88. Memphis won the series, 4–1

==== Cycling ====
- Grand Tours:
  - Giro d'Italia, Stage 11: (gold) Ramūnas Navardauskas (LTU) (Garmin–Sharp) 4h 23' 14" (silver) Daniel Oss (ITA)(BMC Racing Team) + 1' 08" (bronze) Stefano Pirazzi (ITA) (Bardiani Valvole–CSF Inox) + 2' 59"

==== Football (soccer) ====
- UEFA Europa League Final: Benfica (Portugal) 1–2 (England) **Chelsea**
  - Chelsea won the title for the first time.
- Copa Libertadores Round of 16, second leg (first leg score in parentheses):
  - Corinthians (Brazil) 1–1 (0–1) (Argentina) **Boca Juniors**. Boca Juniors won on points 4–1.
  - Vélez Sársfield (Argentina) 1–2 (1–0) (Argentina) **Newell's Old Boys**. Tied on points 3–3, Newell's Old Boys won on away goals.
- AFC Champions League Round of 16, first leg:
  - Central Coast Mariners (Australia) 1–2 (China) Guangzhou Evergrande
  - Jeonbuk Hyundai Motors (South Korea) 0–2 (Japan) Kashiwa Reysol
  - Al-Shabab Al-Arabi (United Arab Emirates) 2–4 (Iran) Esteghlal
  - Al-Hilal (Saudi Arabia) 0–1 (Qatar) Lekhwiya
- AFC Cup Round of 16 (teams in **bold** advance to the quarter-finals):
  - **New Radiant** (Maldives) 2–0 (Malaysia) Selangor
  - **East Bengal** (India) 5–1 (Myanmar) Yangon United
  - **Al-Qadsia** (Kuwait) 4–0 (Oman) Fanja
  - Arbil (Iraq) 3–4 (Syria) **Al-Shorta**
- Bosnia and Herzegovina Cup Final, second leg (first leg score in parentheses): Široki Brijeg – (1–1) Željezničar
- (Bulgaria) Bulgarian Cup Final in Lovech: **Beroe Stara Zagora** 3–3 (3–1 on pen.) Levski Sofia
  - Beroe Stara Zagora won their second Cup title.

==== Ice hockey ====
- Stanley Cup playoffs (all series best-of-7; seeds in parentheses):
  - Western Conference Semifinals:
    - Game 1 in Chicago: (1) Chicago Blackhawks 4, (7) Detroit Red Wings 1. Chicago leads series, 1–0.

=== May 14, 2013 (Tuesday) ===
==== Basketball ====
- NBA Playoffs (all series best-of-7; seeds in parentheses):
  - Eastern Conference semifinals:
    - Game 4 in Indianapolis: (3) Indiana Pacers 93, (2) New York 82. Pacers leads series, 3–1.
  - Western Conference semifinals:
    - Game 5 in San Antonio: (2) San Antonio Spurs 109, (6) Golden State Warriors 91. Spurs leads series, 3–2.

==== Cycling ====
- Grand Tours:
  - Giro d'Italia, Stage 10: (gold) Rigoberto Urán (COL) (Team Sky) 4h 37' 42" (silver) Carlos Betancur (COL) (Ag2r–La Mondiale) + 20" (bronze) Vincenzo Nibali (ITA) (Astana) + 31"

==== Football (soccer) ====
- Copa Libertadores Round of 16, second leg (first leg score in parentheses): Palmeiras (Brazil) 1–2 (0–0) (Mexico) **Tijuana**. Tijuana won on points 4–1.
- AFC Champions League Round of 16, first leg:
  - Buriram United (Thailand) 2–1 (Uzbekistan) Bunyodkor
  - Beijing Guoan (China) 0–0 (South Korea) FC Seoul
  - Al-Gharafa (Qatar) 1–2 (Saudi Arabia) Al-Shabab
  - El Jaish (Qatar) 1–1 (Saudi Arabia) Al-Ahli
- AFC Cup Round of 16 (teams in **bold** advance to the quarter-finals):
  - **Semen Padang** (Indonesia) 2–1 (Vietnam) SHB Đà Nẵng
  - Kelantan (Malaysia) 0–2 (Hong Kong) **Kitchee**
  - **Al-Faisaly** (Jordan) 3–1 (Bahrain) Al-Riffa
  - **Al-Kuwait** 1–1 (4–1 in pen.) (Iraq) Duhok
- UEFA European Under-17 Championship Semi-finals in Slovakia:
  - Slovakia 0–2 **Italy**
  - **Russia** 0–0 (10–9 in pen.) Sweden

==== Ice Hockey ====
- World Championship, Preliminary round, final matchday (teams in **bold** advance to the quarter-finals):
  - Group H in Helsinki:
    - **Slovakia** 4–1 **United States**
    - France 2–3 OT Germany
    - Latvia 2–3 OT **Finland**
      - Final standings: Finland 16 points, **Russia**, United States 15, Slovakia 10, Germany 9, Latvia, France 7, Austria 5.
  - Group S in Stockholm:
    - Belarus 1–4 **Switzerland**
    - **Czech Republic** 7–0 Norway
    - Denmark 2–4 **Sweden**
      - Final standings: Switzerland 20 points, **Canada** 18, Sweden 15, Czech Republic 11, Norway 9, Denmark 6, Belarus 3, Slovenia 2.
- Stanley Cup playoffs (all series best-of-7; seeds in parentheses):
  - Eastern Conference Semifinals:
    - Game 1 in Pittsburgh: (1) Pittsburgh Penguins 4, (7) Ottawa Senators. Penguins leads series, 1–0.
  - Western Conference Semifinals:
    - Game 1 in Los Angeles: (5) Los Angeles Sharks 2, (6) San Jose Sharks 0. Sharks leads series, 1–0.

=== May 13, 2013 (Monday) ===
==== Basketball ====
- NBA Playoffs (all series best-of-7; seeds in parentheses):
  - Eastern Conference semifinals:
    - Game 4 in Chicago: (5) Chicago Bulls 65, (1) Miami Heat 88. Heat leads series, 3–1.
  - Western Conference semifinals:
    - Game 4 in Memphis: (5) Memphis Grizzlies 103, (1) Oklahoma City Thunder 97. Grizzlies leads series, 3–1.

==== Ice Hockey ====
- World Championship, Preliminary round:
  - Group H in Helsinki:
    - Latvia 3–1 France
    - Austria 4–8 Russia
  - Group S in Stockholm:
    - Denmark 3–2 Belarus
    - Canada 4–3 OT Slovenia
- Stanley Cup playoffs (all series best-of-7; seeds in parentheses):
  - Eastern Conference Quarterfinals:
    - Game 7 in Washington, D.C.: (3) Washington Capitals 0, (6) **New York Rangers** 5. Rangers won the series, 4–3.
    - Game 7 in Boston: (4) **Boston Bruins** 5, (5) Toronto Maple Leafs 4. Bruins won the series, 4–3.

=== May 12, 2013 (Sunday) ===
==== Auto racing ====
- Formula One:
  - 2013 Spanish Grand Prix in Montmeló, Spain: (1) Fernando Alonso (ESP) (Ferrari) 1:39:16.596 (2) Kimi Räikkönen (FIN) (Lotus–Renault) +9.338 (3) Felipe Massa (BRA) (Ferrari) +26.049

==== Basketball ====
- Euroleague Final Four in London, United Kingdom:
  - Third-place playoff: (Russia) **CSKA Moscow** 74–73 (Spain) FC Barcelona Regal
  - Final: (Greece) **Olympiacos Piraeus** 100–88 (Spain) Real Madrid
    - Olympiacos Piraeus won the title for the second time in a row and the third time overall.
- NBA Playoffs (all series best-of-7; seeds in parentheses):
  - Western Conference semifinals
    - Game 4 in Oakland: (6) Golden State 97, (2) San Antonio 87. Series tied, 2–2

==== Cycling ====
- Grand Tours:
  - Giro d'Italia, Stage 9: (gold) Maxim Belkov (RUS) (Team Katusha) (silver) Carlos Betancur (COL) (Ag2r–La Mondiale) + 44" (bronze) Jarlinson Pantano (COL) (Colombia) + 46"
- UCI Women's Road World Cup:
  - Tour of Chongming Island in Shanghai, China: (gold) Annette Edmondson (AUS) (silver) Chloe Hosking (AUS) (bronze) Lucy Garner (GBR)

==== Football (soccer) ====
- OFC Champions League Semi-finals, second leg (first leg score in parentheses): **Waitakere United** (New Zealand) 2–1 (2–0) (Vanuatu) Amicale. Waitakere United won 4–1 on aggregate.
  - Waitakere reach the final for the fourth time.
- AFC President's Cup group stage, final matchday (teams in **bold** advance to the final stage):
  - Group B in Cebu City, Philippines:
    - **KRL** (Pakistan) 8–0 (Bhutan) Yeedzin
    - Global FC (Philippines) 1–6 (Kyrgyzstan) **Dordoi Bishkek**
      - Final standings: Dordoi Bishkek, KRL 7 points, Global 3, Yeedzin 0.

==== Golf ====
- PGA Tour:
  - The Players Championship in Ponte Vedra Beach, Florida:
    - Winner: Tiger Woods (USA) 275 (−13)
      - Woods won his 78th title of his career.

==== Ice Hockey ====
- World Championship, Preliminary round:
  - Group H in Helsinki:
    - United States 3–0 Germany
    - Slovakia 1–3 Russia
  - Group S in Stockholm:
    - Canada 2–1 Czech Republic
    - Norway 1–3 Switzerland
- Stanley Cup playoffs (all series best-of-7; seeds in parentheses):
  - Eastern Conference Quarterfinals:
    - Game 6 in New York: (6) New York Rangers 1, (3) Washington Capitals 0. Series tied, 3–3.
    - Game 6 in Toronto: (5) Toronto Maple Leafs 2, (4) Boston Bruins 1. Series tied, 3–3.
  - Western Conference Quarterfinals:
    - Game 7 in Anaheim: (2) Anaheim Ducks 2, (7) **Detroit Red Wings** 3. Red Wings won the series, 4–3.

==== Tennis ====
- ATP World Tour:
  - Mutua Madrid Open in Madrid, Spain:
    - Final: **Rafael Nadal** (ESP) def. Stanislas Wawrinka (SWI) 6–2, 6–4.
      - Nadal won his third Mutua Madrid Open title, his 23rd Masters 1000 title and his 55th title overall.
- WTA Tour:
  - Mutua Madrid Open in Madrid, Spain:
    - Final: **Serena Williams** (USA) def. Maria Sharapova (RUS) 6–1, 6–4.
      - Williams won her second Mutua Madrid Open title, her third Premier Mandatory title and her 50th title overall.

=== May 11, 2013 (Saturday) ===
==== Auto racing ====
- Sprint Cup Series
  - Bojangles' Southern 500 in Darlington, South Carolina: (1) Matt Kenseth (USA) (Toyota, Joe Gibbs Racing) (2) Denny Hamlin (USA) (Toyota, Joe Gibbs Racing) (3) Jeff Gordon (USA) (Chevrolet, Hendrick Motorsports)

==== Basketball ====
- NBA Playoffs (all series best-of-7; seeds in parentheses):
  - Eastern Conference semifinals:
    - Game 3 in Indianapolis: (3) Indiana Pacers 82, (2) New York 71. Pacers leads series, 2–1
  - Western Conference semifinals:
    - Game 3 in Memphis: (5) Memphis 87, (1) Oklahoma City Thunder 81. Grizzlies leads series, 2–1

==== Cycling ====
- Grand Tours:
  - Giro d'Italia, Stage 8: (gold) Alex Dowsett (GBR) (Movistar Team) 1h 16' 27" (silver) Bradley Wiggins (GBR) (Team Sky) + 10" (bronze) Tanel Kangert (EST) (Astana) + 14"

==== Football (soccer) ====
- OFC Champions League Semi-finals, second leg (first leg score in parentheses): Ba (Fiji) 0–1 (1–6) (New Zealand) **Auckland City**. Auckland City won 7–1 on aggregate.
  - Auckland City reach the final for the third time in a row and the fifth time overall.
- AFC President's Cup group stage, final matchday (teams in **bold** advance to the final stage):
  - Group A in Kathmandu, Nepal:
    - **Erchim** (Mongolia) 1–0 (Bangladesh) Abahani Limited Dhaka
    - **Three Star Club** (Nepal) 2–2 (Chinese Taipei) Taiwan Power Company
      - Final standings: Three Star Club 5 points, Erchim 4, Taiwan Power Company 3, Abahani Limited Dhaka 2
- UEFA European Under-17 Championship Group stage in Slovakia, final matchday (teams in **bold** advance to the semi-finals, teams in italics qualify for the 2013 FIFA U-17 World Cup):
  - Group A:
    - **Sweden** 0–0 **Slovakia**
    - Austria 2–1 Switzerland
      - Final standings: Slovakia, Sweden 5 points, Austria 4, Switzerland 1.
  - Group B:
    - Ukraine 1–2 Croatia
    - **Italy** 1–1 **Russia**
      - Final standings: Russia, Italy, Croatia 5 points, Ukraine 0.
- (England) FA Cup Final in London: Manchester City 0–1 **Wigan Athletic**
  - Wigan Athletic won the FA Cup for the first time.
- (Greece) Greek Cup Final in Athens: Asteras Tripolis 1–3 (a.e.t.) **Olympiacos**
  - Olympiacos won the Greek Cup for the 26th time.
- (Spain) La Liga, matchday 35 (teams in **bold** qualify for the UEFA Champions League):
  - Espanyol 1–1 **Real Madrid**
    - Standings: **FC Barcelona** 87 points (35 matches), Real Madrid 81 (36), **Atlético Madrid** 72 (36)
    - FC Barcelona won their 4th title in five years, and their 22nd overall.

==== Ice Hockey ====
- World Championship, Preliminary round:
  - Group H in Helsinki:
    - United States 4–2 France
    - Finland 7–2 Austria
    - Germany 2–0 Latvia
  - Group S in Stockholm:
    - Switzerland 4–1 Denmark
    - Sweden 2–0 Slovenia
    - Norway 3–1 Belarus
- Stanley Cup playoffs (all series best-of-7; seeds in parentheses):
  - Eastern Conference Quarterfinals:
    - Game 6 in New York: (8) New York Islanders 3, (1) **Pittsburgh Penguins** 4. Penguins won the series, 4–2.

=== May 10, 2013 (Friday) ===
==== Athletics ====
- IAAF Diamond League:
  - Qatar Athletic Super Grand Prix in Doha, Qatar:
    - Men:
      - 100 m: Justin Gatlin (USA) 9.97 SB
      - 800 m: David Rudisha (KEN) 1:43.87 WL
      - 1500 m: Asbel Kiprop (KEN) 3:31.13 WL
      - 5000 m: Hagos Gebrhiwet (ETH) 7:30.36 WL, PB
      - 400 m h: Michael Tinsley (USA) 48.92
      - Triple jump: Christian Taylor (USA) 17.25 m SB
      - High jump: Bohdan Bondarenko (UKR) 2.33 m =MR, PB
      - Pole vault: Konstadinos Filippidis (GRE) 5.82 m WL, NR, MR
      - Shot put: Ryan Whiting (USA) 22.28 WL, MR, PB
      - Javelin: Vítězslav Veselý (CZE) 85.09 SB
    - Women:
      - 200 m: Shelly-Ann Fraser-Pryce (JAM) 22.48
      - 400 m: Amantle Montsho (BOT) 49.88 WL
      - 1500 m: Abeba Aregawi (SWE) 3:56.60 WL, NR, MR
      - 100 m h: Dawn Harper (USA) 12.60 WL
      - 3000 m st: Lydiah Chepkurui (KEN) 9:13.75 WL, MR, PB
      - Long jump: Brittney Reese (USA) 7.25 WL, MR, PB
      - Discus: Sandra Perković (CRO) 68.23 WL, MR

==== Auto racing ====
- Nationwide Series:
  - VFW Sport Clips Help a Hero 200 in Darlington, South Carolina: (1) (2) (3)

==== Basketball ====
- Euroleague Final Four in London, United Kingdom, Semi-finals:
  - CSKA Moscow (Russia) 52–69 (Greece) **Olympiacos Piraeus**
    - Olympiacos reach the final for the sixth time.
  - **Real Madrid** (Spain) 74–67 (Spain) FC Barcelona Regal
    - Real Madrid reach the final for the 15th time.
    - Real Madrid and Olympiacos will meet in a repeat of the 1995 final.
- NBA Playoffs (all series best-of-7; seeds in parentheses):
  - Eastern Conference semifinals:
    - Game 3 in Chicago: (5) Chicago Bulls 94, Miami Heat 104. Heat leads series, 2–1
  - Western Conference semifinals
    - Game 3 in Oakland: (6) Golden State 92, San Antonio 102. Spurs leads series, 2–1

==== Cycling ====
- Grand Tours:
  - Giro d'Italia, Stage 7: (gold) Adam Hansen (AUS) (Lotto–Belisol) 4h 35' 49" (silver) Enrico Battaglin (ITA) (Bardiani Valvole–CSF Inox) + 1' 07" (bronze) Danilo Di Luca (ITA) (Vini Fantini–Selle Italia) + 1' 07"

==== Football (soccer) ====
- AFC President's Cup group stage:
  - Group B in Cebu City, Philippines, matchday 2:
    - Yeedzin (Bhutan) 0–9 (Kyrgyzstan) Dordoi Bishkek
    - KRL (Pakistan) 2–0 (Philippines) Global FC
  - Group C in Phnom Penh, Cambodia, final matchday (teams in **bold** advance to the final stage):
    - **Balkan** (Turkmenistan) 5–0 Sri Lanka Army
    - Boeung Ket Rubber Field (Cambodia) 0–1 (Palestine) **Hilal Al-Quds**
      - Final standings: Balkan 9 points, Hilal Al-Quds 6, Boeung Ket Rubber Field3, Sri Lanka Army 0.

==== Ice Hockey ====
- World Championship, Preliminary round:
  - Group H in Helsinki:
    - Slovakia 1–2 (GWS) Austria
    - Russia 2–3 Finland
  - Group S in Stockholm:
    - Slovenia 2–4 Czech Republic
    - Belarus 1–4 Canada
- Stanley Cup playoffs (all series best-of-7; seeds in parentheses):
  - Eastern Conference Quarterfinals:
    - Game 5 in Washington, D.C.: (3) Washington Capitals 2, (6) New York Rangers 1. Capitals leads series, 3–2.
    - Game 5 in Boston: (4) Boston Bruins 1, (5) Toronto Maple Leafs 2. Bruins leads series, 3–2.
  - Western Conference Quarterfinals:
    - Game 6 in Detroit: (7) Detroit Red Wings 4, (2) Anaheim Ducks 3. Series tied, 3–3.
    - Game 6 in Los Angeles: (5) **Los Angeles Kings** 2, (4) Sr. Louis Blues 1. Kings won the series, 4–2.

=== May 9, 2013 (Thursday) ===
==== Cycling ====
- Grand Tours:
  - Giro d'Italia, Stage 6: (gold) Mark Cavendish (GBR) (Omega Pharma–Quick-Step) 3h 56' 03" (silver) Elia Viviani (ITA) (Cannondale) s.t. (bronze) Matthew Goss (AUS) (Orica–GreenEDGE) s.t.

==== Football (soccer) ====
- Copa Libertadores Round of 16, second leg (first leg score in parentheses): Nacional (Uruguay) 1–0 (0–1) (Peru) **Real Garcilaso**. Tied on points 3–3, Real Garcilaso won on penalties (1–4).
- AFC President's Cup group stage, matchday 2:
  - Group A in Kathmandu, Nepal:
    - Abahani Limited Dhaka (Bangladesh) 1–1 (Chinese Taipei) Taiwan Power Company
    - Erchim (Mongolia) 0–2 (Nepal) Three Star Club
- (Belgium) Belgian Cup Final in Brussels: **Genk** 2–0 Cercle Brugge
  - Genk won the Cup for the 4th time.
- (Denmark) Danish Cup Final in Copenhagen: Randers FC 0–1 **Esbjerg fB**
  - Esbjerg fB won the Cup for the 3rd time.
- (Netherlands) KNVB Cup Final in Rotterdam: **AZ** 2–1 PSV Eindhoven
  - AZ won the Cup for the 4th time.

==== Ice Hockey ====
- World Championship, Preliminary round:
  - Group H in Helsinki:
    - Russia 1–2 France
    - Slovakia 3–5 Latvia
  - Group S in Stockholm:
    - Czech Republic 2–1 (GWS) Denmark
    - Sweden 0–3 Canada
- Stanley Cup playoffs (all series best-of-7; seeds in parentheses):
  - Eastern Conference Quarterfinals:
    - Game 5 in Pittsburgh: (1) Pittsburgh Penguins 4, (8) New York Islanders 0. Penguins leads series, 3–2.
    - Game 5 in Montreal: (2) Montreal Canadiens 1, (7) **Ottawa Senators** 6. Senators won the series, 4–1
  - Western Conference Quarterfinals:
    - Game 5 in Chicago: (1) **Chicago Blackhawks** 5, (8) Minnesota Wild 1. Blackhawks won the series, 4–1.

=== May 8, 2013 (Wednesday) ===
==== Basketball ====
- NBA Playoffs (all series best-of-7; seeds in parentheses):
  - Eastern Conference semifinals:
    - Game 2 in Miami: (1) Miami Heat 115, Chicago Bulls 78. Series tied, 1–1
  - Western Conference semifinals:
    - Game 2 in San Antonio: (2) San Antonio 91, (6) Golden State Warriors 100. Series tied, 1–1

==== Cycling ====
- Grand Tours:
  - Giro d'Italia, Stage 5: (gold) John Degenkolb (GER) (Argos–Shimano) 4h 37' 48" (silver) Ángel Vicioso (ESP) (Team Katusha) s.t. (bronze) Paul Martens (GER) (Blanco Pro Cycling) s.t.

==== Football (soccer) ====
- Copa Libertadores Round of 16, second leg (first leg score in parentheses):
  - **Atlético Mineiro** (Brazil) 4–1 (2–1) (Brazil) São Paulo. Atlético Mineiro won on points 6–0.
  - **Fluminense** (Brazil) 2–0 (1–2) (Ecuador) Emelec. Tied on points 3–3, Fluminense won on goal difference.
- AFC President's Cup Group stage (teams in **bold** advance to the final stage):
  - Group B in Cebu City, Philippines, matchday 1:
    - Dordoi Bishkek (Kyrgyzstan) 1–1 (Pakistan) KRL
    - Global FC (Philippines) 5–0 (Bhutan) Yeedzin
  - Group C in Phnom Penh, Cambodia, matchday 2:
    - Sri Lanka Army 0–10 (Palestine) Hilal Al-Quds
    - **Balkan** (Turkmenistan) 2–0 (Cambodia) Boeung Ket Rubber Field
- UEFA European Under-17 Football Championship Group stage in Slovakia, matchday 2:
  - Group A:
    - Austria 1–1 Sweden
    - Slovakia 2–2 Switzerland
  - Group B:
    - Russia 0–0 Croatia
    - Ukraine 1–2 Italy
- (Croatia) Croatian Cup Final, first leg: Hajduk Split 2–1 Lokomotiva
- Israel State Cup Final in Netanya: Ironi Kiryat Shmona 1–1 (2–4 pen.) **Hapoel Ramat Gan**
  - Hapoel Ramat Gan won the Cup for the second time.
- (Poland) Polish Cup Final, second leg (first leg score in parentheses): **Legia Warsaw** 0–1 (2–0) Śląsk Wrocław. Legia Warsaw won 2–1 on aggregate.
  - Legia Warsaw won the Cup for the third time in a row and the 16th title overall.
- (Serbia) Serbian Cup Final in Belgrade: **Jagodina** 1–0 Vojvodina
  - Jagodina won the Cup for the first time.

==== Ice Hockey ====
- World Championship, Preliminary round, 6th matchday:
  - Group H in Helsinki:
    - Austria 0–2 Germany
    - United States 4–1 Finland
  - Group S in Stockholm:
    - Slovenia 1–7 Switzerland
    - Norway 3–2 Sweden
- Stanley Cup playoffs (all series best-of-7; seeds in parentheses):
  - Eastern Conference Quarterfinals:
    - Game 4 in New York: (6) New York Rangers 4, (3) Washington Capitals 3. Series tied, 2–2.
    - Game 4 in Toronto: (5) Toronto Maple Leafs 3, (4) Boston Bruins 4. Bruins leads series, 3–1.
  - Western Conference Quarterfinals:
    - Game 5 in Anaheim: (2) Anaheim Ducks 3, (7) Detroit Red Wings 2. Ducks leads series, 3–2.
    - Game 5 in St. Louis: (4) St. Louis Blues 2, (5) Los Angeles Kings 3. Kings leads series, 3–2.

=== May 7, 2013 (Tuesday) ===
==== Basketball ====
- NBA Playoffs (all series best-of-7; seeds in parentheses):
  - Eastern Conference semifinals:
    - Game 2 in New York: (2) New York 105, (3) Indiana Pacers 79. Series tied, 1–1.
  - Western Conference semifinals:
    - Game 2 in Oklahoma City: (1) Oklahoma City 93, (5) Memphis Grizzlies 99. Series tied, 1–1.

==== Cycling ====
- Grand Tours:
  - Giro d'Italia, Stage 4: (gold) Enrico Battaglin (ITA) (Bardiani Valvole–CSF Inox) 6h 14' 19" (silver) Fabio Felline (ITA) (Androni Giocattoli–Venezuela) s.t. (bronze) Giovanni Visconti (ITA) (Movistar Team) s.t.

==== Football (soccer) ====
- AFC President's Cup group stage, matchday 1:
  - Group A in Kathmandu, Nepal:
    - Taiwan Power Company (Chinese Taipei) 0–0 (Mongolia) Erchim
    - Three Star Club (Nepal) 1–1 (Bangladesh) Abahani Limited Dhaka
- (Armenia) Armenian Cup Final in Yerevan: **Pyunik** 1–0 Shirak
  - Pyunik won the Cup for the fifth time.

==== Ice Hockey ====
- World Championship, Preliminary round, 5th matchday:
  - Group H in Helsinki:
    - Austria 6–3 Latvia
    - Russia 5–3 United States
  - Group S in Stockholm:
    - Slovenia 2–3 OT Denmark
    - Canada 7–1 Norway
- Stanley Cup playoffs (all series best-of-7; seeds in parentheses):
  - Eastern Conference Quarterfinals:
    - Game 4 in New York: (8) New York Islanders 6, (1) Pittsburgh Penguins 4. Series tied, 2–2.
    - Game 4 in Ottawa: (7) Ottawa Senators 3, (2) Montreal Canadiens 2. Senators leads series, 3–1.
  - Western Conference Quarterfinals:
    - Game 4 in Saint Paul: (8) Minnesota Wild 0, (1) Chicago Blackhawks 3. Blackhawks leads series, 3–1.
    - Game 4 in San Jose: (6) **San Jose Sharks** 4, (3) Vancouver Canucks 3. San Jose won the series, 4–0

=== May 6, 2013 (Monday) ===
==== Basketball ====
- NBA Playoffs (all series best-of-7; seeds in parentheses):
  - Eastern Conference semifinals:
    - Game 1 in Miami: (1) Miami Heat 86, Chicago Bulls 93. Bulls leads series 1–0.
  - Western Conference semifinals:
    - Game 1 in San Antonio: (2) San Antonio 129, (6) Golden State Warriors 127. Spurs lead series 1–0.

==== Cycling ====
- Grand Tours:
  - Giro d'Italia, Stage 3: (gold) Luca Paolini (ITA) (Team Katusha) 5h 43' 50" (silver) Cadel Evans (AUS) (BMC Racing Team) + 16" (bronze) Ryder Hesjedal (CAN) (Garmin–Sharp) + 16"

==== Football (soccer) ====
- AFC President's Cup Group stage, matchday 1:
  - Group C in Phnom Penh, Cambodia:
    - Hilal Al-Quds (Palestine) 2–3 (Turkmenistan) Balkan
    - Boeung Ket Rubber Field (Cambodia) 6–0 Sri Lanka Army
- (Wales) Welsh Cup Final in Wrexham: Bangor City 1–3 (a.e.t.) **Prestatyn Town**
  - Prestatyn Town won the Cup for the first time.

==== Ice Hockey ====
- World Championship, Preliminary round, 4th matchday:
  - Group H in Helsinki:
    - Germany 2–3 Slovakia
    - Finland 3–1 France
  - Group S in Stockholm:
    - Switzerland 5–2 Czech Republic
    - Sweden 2–1 Belarus
- Stanley Cup playoffs (all series best-of-7; seeds in parentheses):
  - Eastern Conference Quarterfinals:
    - Game 3 in New York: (6) New York Rangers 4, (3) Washington Capitals 3. Capitals leads series, 2–1.
    - Game 3 in Toronto: (5) Toronto Maple Leafs 2, (4) Boston Bruins 5. Bruins leads series, 2–1.
  - Western Conference Quarterfinals:
    - Game 4 in Detroit: (7) Detroit Red Wings 3, (2) Anaheim Ducks 2. Series tied, 2–2.
    - Game 4 in Los Angeles: (5) Los Angeles Kings 4, (4) Sr. Louis Blues 3. Series tied, 2–2.

=== May 5, 2013 (Sunday) ===
==== Auto Racing ====
- Monster Energy NASCAR Cup Series
  - Aaron's 499, Talladega Superspeedway: 1. #34 David Ragan (Front Row Motorsports Ford) 2. #38 David Gilliland (Front Row Motorsports Ford) 3. #99 Carl Edwards (Roush Fenway Racing Ford) 4. #55 Michael Waltrip (Michael Waltrip Racing Toyota) 5. #48 Jimmie Johnson (Hendrick Motorsports Chevrolet)

==== Basketball ====
- NBA Playoffs (all series best-of-7; seeds in parentheses):
  - Eastern Conference semifinals:
    - Game 1 in New York: (2) New York 95, (3) Indiana Pacers 102. Pacers leads series 1–0.
  - Western Conference semifinals:
    - Game 1 in Oklahoma City: (1) Oklahoma City 93, (5) Memphis Grizzlies 91. Thunder leads series 1–0.

==== Cycling ====
- Grand Tours:
  - Giro d'Italia, Stage 2: (gold) Team Sky 22' 05" (silver) Movistar Team + 9" (bronze) Astana + 14"

==== Football (soccer) ====
- UEFA European Under-17 Championship Group stage in Slovakia, matchday 1:
  - Group A:
    - Slovakia 1–0 Austria
    - Switzerland 0–1 Sweden
  - Group B:
    - Russia 3–0 Ukraine
    - Croatia 0–0 Italy
- CAF Champions League second qualifying round, second leg (first leg score in parentheses, teams in **bold** qualify for the group stage, teams in italics enter the Confederation Cup play-off round):
  - Saint George (Ethiopia) 2–2 (1–1) (Egypt) **Zamalek**. 3–3 on aggregate. Zamalek won on away goals.
  - **Al-Ahly** (Egypt) 2–1 (0–0) (Tunisia) CA Bizertin. Al-Ahly won 2–1 on aggregate.
  - TP Mazembe (Democratic Republic of the Congo) 1–0 (1–3) (South Africa) **Orlando Pirates**. Orlando Pirates won 3–1 on aggregate.
- CAF Confederations Cup second round, second leg (first leg score in parentheses, teams in **bold** qualify for the next round):
  - Wydad Casablanca (Morocco) 3–1 (0–2) (Mozambique) **Liga Muçulmana**. 3–3 on aggregate. Liga Muçulmana won on away goals.
  - Diables Noirs (Republic of the Congo) 1–1 (1–3) (Tunisia) **CS Sfaxien**. CS Sfaxien won 4–2 on aggregate.
- OFC Champions League Semi-finals, first leg: Auckland City (New Zealand) 6–1 (Fiji) Ba

==== Golf ====
- PGA Tour:
  - Wells Fargo Championship in Charlotte, North Carolina:
    - Winner: Derek Ernst (USA) 280 (−8)^{PO}
      - Ersnt defeats David Lynn on the first playoff hole to win his first PGA Tour title.
- European Tour:
  - Volvo China Open in Tianjin, China:
    - Winner: Brett Rumford (AUS) 272 (−16)
      - Rumford won his fifth European Tour title.
- LPGA Tour:
  - Kingsmill Championship in Williamsburg, Virginia, United States:
    - Winner: Cristie Kerr (USA) 272 (−12)
      - Kerr won her 16th LPGA Tour title.

==== Ice Hockey ====
- World Championship, Preliminary round, third matchday:
  - Group H in Helsinki:
    - France 3–1 Austria
    - Germany 1–4 Russia
    - Latvia 1–4 United States
  - Group S in Stockholm:
    - Belarus 4–3 Slovenia
    - Switzerland 3–2 GWS Canada
    - Norway 3–2 Denmark
- Stanley Cup playoffs (all series best-of-7; seeds in parentheses):
  - Eastern Conference Quarterfinals:
    - Game 3 in New York: (8) New York Islanders 4, (1) Pittsburgh Penguins 5. Penguins leads series, 2–1.
    - Game 3 in Ottawa: (7) Ottawa Senators 6, (2) Montreal Canadiens 1. Senators leads series, 2–1.
  - Western Conference Quarterfinals:
    - Game 3 in Saint Paul: (8) Minnesota Wild 3, (1) Chicago Blackhawks 2. Blackhawks leads series, 2–1.
    - Game 3 in San Jose: (6) San Jose Sharks 5, (3) Vancouver Canucks 0. San Jose leads series, 3–0

==== Motorcycle racing ====
- Moto GP:
  - Spanish Grand Prix in Jerez de la Frontera:
    - Moto GP: (1) Dani Pedrosa (ESP) (Honda) (2) Marc Márquez (ESP) (Honda) (3) Jorge Lorenzo (ESP) (Yamaha)
    - Moto2: (1) Esteve Rabat (ESP) (Kalex) (2) Scott Redding (GBR) (Kalex) (3) Pol Espargaró (ESP) (Kalex)
    - Moto3: (1) Maverick Viñales (ESP) (KTM) (2) Luis Salom (ESP) (KTM) (3) Jonas Folger (GER) (KTM)

==== Tennis ====
- ATP World Tour:
  - BMW Open in Munich, Germany:
    - Final: **Tommy Haas** (GER) def. Philipp Kohlschreiber (GER) 6–3, 7–6(3)
      - Haas won the 14th title of his career.
  - Portugal Open in Oeiras, Portugal:
    - Final: **Stanislas Wawrinka** (SWI) def. David Ferrer (ESP) 6–1, 6–4
      - Wawrinka won the 4th title of his career.
- WTA Tour:
  - Portugal Open in Oeiras, Portugal:
    - Final: **Anastasia Pavlyuchenkova** (RUS) def. Carla Suárez Navarro (ESP) 7–5, 6–2
      - Pavlyuchenkova won her second title of the year and the fifth of her career.

=== May 4, 2013 (Saturday) ===
==== Auto racing ====
- Nationwide Series:
  - Aaron's 312 in Talladega, Alabama: (1) Regan Smith (Chevrolet, JR Motorsports) (2) Joey Logano (Ford, Penske Racing) (3) Kasey Kahne (Chevrolet, JR Motorsports)

==== Basketball ====
- NBA Playoffs (all series best-of-7; seeds in parentheses):
  - Eastern Conference first round:
    - Game 7 in Brooklyn: (4) Brooklyn Nets 93, (5) Chicago Bulls 99. Bulls won the series, 4–3

==== Cycling ====
- Grand Tours:
  - Giro d'Italia, Stage 1: (gold) Mark Cavendish (GBR) (Omega Pharma–Quick-Step) 2h 58' 38" (silver) Elia Viviani (ITA) (Cannondale) s.t. (bronze) Nacer Bouhanni (FRA) (FDJ) s.t.

==== Football (soccer) ====
- CAF Champions League second qualifying round, second leg (first leg score in parentheses, teams in **bold** qualify for the group stage, teams in italics enter the Confederation Cup play-off round):
  - **Recreativo do Libolo** (Angola) 3–1 (0–0) (Nigeria) Enugu Rangers. Recreativo de Libolo won 3–1 on aggregate.
  - **Espérance ST** (Tunisia) 1–0 (0–0) (Algeria) JSM Béjaïa. Espérance ST won 1–0 on aggregate.
  - **Séwé Sport** (Ivory Coast) 0–0 (1–1) (Morocco) FUS Rabat. 1–1 on aggregate. Séwé Sport won on away goals.
  - Stade Malien (Mali) 0–0 (0–3) (Cameroon) **Coton Sport**. Coton Sport won 3–0 on aggregate
- CAF Confederations Cup second round, second leg (first leg score in parentheses, teams in **bold** qualify for the next round):
  - SuperSport United (South Africa) 1–3 (0–0) (Egypt) **ENPPI**. ENPPI won 3–1 on aggregate.
  - **LLB Académic** (Burundi) 1–0 (0–1) (Ivory Coast) ASEC Mimosas. 1–1 on aggregate. LLB Académic won on penalties.
  - **US Bitam** (Gabon) 3–0 (0–0) (Algeria) USM Alger. US Bitam won 3–0 on aggregate.
  - **Étoile du Sahel** (Tunisia) 6–1 (1–1) (Angola) Recreativo da Caála. Étoile du Sahel won 7–2 on aggregate.
  - **FAR Rabat** (Morocco) 2–1 (0–0) (Tanzania) Azam. FAR Rabat won 2–1 on aggregate.
- OFC Champions League Semi-finals, first leg: Amicale (Vanuatu) 0–2 (New Zealand) Waitakere United
- (Northern Ireland) Irish Cup Final in Belfast: Cliftonville 1–3 (a.e.t.) **Glentoran**
  - Glentoran won the Cup for the 21st time.

==== Ice Hockey ====
- World Championship, Preliminary round, second matchday:
  - Group H in Helsinki:
    - United States 5–3 Austria
    - Russia 6–0 Latvia
    - Finland 2–0 Slovakia
  - Group S in Stockholm:
    - Norway 3–1 Slovenia
    - Canada 3–1 Denmark
    - Czech Republic 1–2 Sweden
- Stanley Cup playoffs (all series best-of-7; seeds in parentheses):
  - Eastern Conference Quarterfinals:
    - Game 2 in Washington, D.C.: (3) Washington Capitals 1, (6) New York Rangers 0. Series tied 1–1.
    - Game 2 in Boston: (4) Boston Bruins 2, (5) Toronto Maple Leafs 4. Series tied 1–1.
  - Western Conference Quarterfinals:
    - Game 3 in Detroit: (7) Detroit Red Wings 0, (2) Anaheim Ducks 4. Ducks leads series, 2–1.
    - Game 3 in Los Angeles: (5) Los Angeles Kings 1, (4) Sr. Louis Blues 0. St. Louis leads series, 2–1.

=== May 3, 2013 (Friday) ===
==== Basketball ====
- NBA Playoffs (all series best-of-7; seeds in parentheses):
  - Eastern Conference first round:
    - Game 6 in Boston: (7) Boston Celtics 80, (2) **New York Knicks** 88. Knicks won the series, 4–2
    - Game 6 in Atlanta: (3) **Indiana Pacers** 81, (6) Atlanta Hawks 73. Pacers won the series, 4–2
  - Western Conference first round:
    - Game 6 in Houston: (8) Houston Rockets 94, (1) **Oklahoma City Thunder** 103. Thunder won the series, 4–2
    - Game 6 in Memphis: (5) **Memphis Grizzlies** 118, (4) Los Angeles Clippers 105. Grizzlies won the series, 4–2

==== Football (soccer) ====
- CAF Champions League second round, second leg (first leg score in parentheses): ES Sétif (Algeria) 3–1 (1–3) (Republic of the Congo) **AC Léopards**. 4–4 on aggregate. AC Léopards won on penalties.
  - AC Léopards advance to the group stage. ES Sétif entered the Confederation Cup play-off round.
- CAF Confederations Cup second round, second leg (first leg score in parentheses): **Ismaily** (Egypt) 0–0 (0–0) (Sudan) Al-Ahly Shendi. 0–0 on aggregate. Ismaily won on penalties.

==== Ice Hockey ====
- World Championship, Preliminary round, first matchday:
  - Group H in Helsinki:
    - France 2–6 Slovakia
    - Finland 4–3 OT Germany
  - Group S in Stockholm:
    - Czech Republic 2–0 Belarus
    - Sweden 2–3 Switzerland
- Stanley Cup playoffs (all series best-of-7; seeds in parentheses):
  - Eastern Conference Quarterfinals:
    - Game 2 in Pittsburgh: (1) Pittsburgh Penguins 3, (8) New York Islanders 4. Series tied, 1–1.
    - Game 2 in Montreal: (2) Montreal Canadiens 3, (7) Ottawa Senators 1. Series tied, 1–1.
  - Western Conference Quarterfinals:
    - Game 2 in Chicago: (1) Chicago Blackhawks 5, (8) Minnesota Wild 2. Blackhawks leads series, 2–0.
    - Game 2 in Vancouver: (3) Vancouver Canucks 2, (6) San Jose Sharks 3. San Jose leads series, 2–0.

=== May 2, 2013 (Thursday) ===
==== Basketball ====
- NBA Playoffs (all series best-of-7; seeds in parentheses):
  - Eastern Conference first round:
    - Game 6 in Chicago: (5) Chicago Bulls 92, (4) Brooklyn Nets 95. Series tied 3–3
  - Western Conference first round:
    - Game 6 in Oakland: (6) Golden State Warriors 92, (3) Denver Nuggets 88. Golden State won the series, 4–2

==== Football (soccer) ====
- UEFA Europa League Semi-finals, second leg (first leg score in parentheses):
  - **Benfica** (Portugal) 3–1 (0–1) (Turkey) Fenerbahçe. Benfica won 3–2 on aggregate.
  - **Chelsea** (England) 3–1 (2–1) (Switzerland) Basel. Chelsea won 5–2 on aggregate.
- Copa Libertadores Round of 16, first leg:
  - São Paulo (Brazil) 1–2 (Brazil) Atlético Mineiro
  - Emelec (Ecuador) 2–1 (Brazil) Fluminense
- (Poland) Polish Cup Final, first leg: Śląsk Wrocław 0–2 Legia Warsaw

==== Ice hockey ====
- Stanley Cup playoffs (all series best-of-7; seeds in parentheses):
  - Eastern Conference Quarterfinals:
    - Game 1 in Montreal: (2) Montreal Canadiens 2, (7) Ottawa Senators 4. Senators leads series, 1–0.
    - Game 1 in Washington, D.C.: (3) Washington Capitals 3, (6) New York Rangers 1. Capitals leads series, 1–0.
  - Western Conference Quarterfinals:
    - Game 2 in Anaheim: (2) Anaheim Ducks 3, (7) Detroit Red Wings 1. Series tied, 1–1.
    - Game 2 in St. Louis: (4) St. Louis Blues 2, (5) Los Angeles Kings 1. S. Louis leads series, 2–0.

=== May 1, 2013 (Wednesday) ===
==== Basketball ====
- NBA Playoffs (all series best-of-7; seeds in parentheses):
  - Eastern Conference first round:
    - Game 5 in New York: (2) New York Knicks 86, Boston Celtics 92. Knicks leads series 3–2.
    - Game 5 in Indianapolis: (3) Indiana Pacers 106, Atlanta Hawks 83. Pacers leads series 3–2.
  - Western Conference first round:
    - Game 5 in Oklahoma City: (1) Oklahoma City Thunder 100, Houston Rockets 107. Thunder leads series 3–2.

==== Football (soccer) ====
- UEFA Champions League Semi-finals, second leg (first leg score in parentheses):
  - FC Barcelona (Spain) 0–3 (0–4) (Germany) **Bayern Munich**. Bayern Munich won 7–0 on aggregate.
    - Bayern Munich reach the final for the second time in a row, the third in four years, and tenth time overall
- Copa Libertadores Round of 16, first leg:
  - Grêmio (Brazil) 2–1 (Colombia) Santa Fe
  - Boca Juniors (Argentina) 1–0 (Brazil) Corinthians
- 2013 AFC Champions League group stage, final matchday (teams in **bold** advance to the knockout stage):
  - Group A:
    - **Al Shabab** (Saudi Arabia) 2–1 (United Arab Emirates) Al Jazira
    - Tractor Sazi (Iran) 2–4 (Qatar) **El Jaish**
      - Final standings: Al Shabab 13 points, El Jaish 11, Al-Jazira 5, Tractor Sazi 4.
  - Group B:
    - **Lekhwiya** (Qatar) 2–0 (Saudi Arabia) Al-Ettifaq
    - Pakhtakor (Uzbekistan) 1–2 (United Arab Emirates) **Al Shabab Al Arabi**
      - Final standings: Lekhwiya 11 points, Al-Shabab Al-Arabi 9, Al-Ettifaq, Pakhtakor 7.
  - Group E:
    - **FC Seoul** (South Korea) 2–2 (Thailand) **Buriram United**
    - Vegalta Sendai (Japan) 1–2 (China) Jiangsu Sainty
      - Final standings: FC Seoul 11 points, Buriram United, Jiangsu Sainty 7, Vegalta Sendai 6.
  - Group F:
    - **Guangzhou Evergrande** (China) 0–0 (South Korea) **Jeonbuk Hyundai Motors**
    - Muangthong United (Thailand) 0–1 (Japan) Urawa Red Diamonds
      - Final standings: Guangzhou Evergrande 11 points, Jeonbuk Hyundai Motors, Urawa Red Diamonds 10, Muangthong United 1.
- 2013 AFC Cup group stage, final matchday (teams in **bold** advance to the knockout stage):
  - Group A:
    - Safa (Lebanon) 1–0 **Al-Kuwait**
    - **Al-Riffa** (Bahrain) 1–1 (Tajikistan) Regar-TadAZ
      - Final standings: Al-Kuwait 12 points, Al-Riffa, Saga 10, Regar-TadAZ 2
  - Group B:
    - **Erbil** (Iraq) 2–0 (Lebanon) Al-Ansar
    - **Fanja** (Oman) 3–1 (Yemen) Al-Ahli Taizz
      - Final standings: Erbil 18 points, Fanja 10, Al-Ansar 7, Al-Ahli Taizz 0.
  - Group E:
    - **Semen Padang** (Indonesia) 3–1 (India) Churchill Brothers
    - **Kitchee** (Hong Kong) 5–0 (Singapore) Warriors
      - Final standings: Semen Padang 16 points, Kitchee 12, Churchill Brothers 4, Warriors 3.
  - Group F:
    - **Yangon United** (Myanmar) 2–0 (Hong Kong) Sunray Cave JC Sun Hei
    - **New Radiant** (Maldives) 6–1 (Indonesia) Persibo Bojonegoro
      - Final standings: New Radiant, Yangon United 15 points, Sunray Cave JC Sun Hei 4, Persibo Bojonegoro 1.
- CONCACAF Champions League Finals, second leg (first leg score in parentheses):
  - **Monterrey** (Mexico) 4–2 (0–0) (Mexico) Santos Laguna
    - Monterrey won the CONCACAF Champions League for the third time in a row and qualify for the 2013 FIFA Club World Cup
- Liechtenstein Cup Final in Vaduz: Balzers 1–1 (0–3 pen.) **Vaduz**
  - Vaduz won the Cup for the 40th time.
- (Slovakia) Slovak Cup Final in Ružomberok: Žilina 0–2 **Slovan Bratislava**
  - Slovan Bratislava won the Cup for the 13th time.

==== Ice hockey ====
- Stanley Cup playoffs (all series best-of-7; seeds in parentheses):
  - Eastern Conference Quarterfinals:
    - Game 1 in Pittsburgh: (1) Pittsburgh Penguins 5, (8) New York Islanders 0. Penguins leads series, 1–0.
    - Game 1 in Boston: (4) Boston Bruins 4, (5) Toronto Maple Leafs 1. Bruins leads series, 1–0.
  - Western Conference Quarterfinals:
    - Game 1 in Vancouver: (3) Vancouver Canucks 1, (6) San Jose Sharks 3. San Jose leads series, 1–0.
