= 2012 Estoril Open =

- Date: 28 April – 6 May
- Edition: 23rd (ATP) / 16th (WTA)
- Surface: Clay / outdoor
- Location: Oeiras, Portugal
- Venue: Estádio Nacional

Champions

Men's singles
- (Argentina) Juan Martín del Potro

Women's singles
- (Estonia) Kaia Kanepi

Men's doubles
- (Pakistan) Aisam-ul-Haq Qureshi /; (Netherlands) Jean-Julien Rojer

Women's doubles
- (Chinese Taipei) Chuang Chia-jung / (China) Zhang Shuai
← 2011 ·	Estoril Open	· 2013 →

The 2012 Estoril Open was a tennis tournament played on outdoor clay courts. It was the 23rd edition of the Estoril Open for the men (the 16th for the women), and was part of the ATP World Tour 250 series of the 2012 ATP World Tour, and of the International-level tournaments of the 2012 WTA Tour. Both the men's and the women's events took place at the Estádio Nacional in Oeiras, Portugal, from 28 April through 6 May 2012.

== ATP singles main-draw entrants ==
=== Seeds ===
Country	Player	Rank^{1}	Seed
ARG	Juan Martín del Potro	10	1
FRA	Richard Gasquet	18	2
SUI	Stanislas Wawrinka	22	3
ESP	Albert Ramos	43	4
UZB	Denis Istomin	44	5
NED	Robin Haase	45	6
ESP	Albert Montañés	69	7
ITA	Flavio Cipolla	70	8

- Seedings are based on the rankings of April 23, 2012

=== Other entrants ===
The following players received wildcards into the main draw:

- (Portugal) Gastão Elias
- (Portugal) João Sousa
- (Portugal) Pedro Sousa

The following players received entry as a special exempt into the main draw:

- (Hungary) Attila Balázs

The following players received entry from the qualifying draw:

- (Spain) Íñigo Cervantes
- (Spain) Javier Martí
- (Spain) Daniel Muñoz de la Nava
- (Spain) Iván Navarro

=== Withdrawals ===
- (Argentina) Carlos Berlocq
- (Argentina) Juan Ignacio Chela
- (France) Gaël Monfils

=== Retirements ===
- (Uzbekistan) Denis Istomin

== ATP doubles main-draw entrants ==
=== Seeds ===
Country	Player	Country	Player	Rank^{1}	Seed
PAK	Aisam-ul-Haq Qureshi	NED	Jean-Julien Rojer	50	1
USA	Eric Butorac	BRA	Bruno Soares	55	2
AUS	Paul Hanley	BRA	Marcelo Melo	67	3
AUT	Julian Knowle	ESP	David Marrero	84	4

- Rankings are as of April 23, 2012

=== Other entrants ===
The following pairs received wildcards into the doubles main draw:

- (Portugal) Gastão Elias / (Portugal) João Sousa
- (Portugal) Frederico Gil / (Portugal) Pedro Sousa

== WTA singles main-draw entrants ==
=== Seeds ===
Country	Player	Rank^{1}	Seed
ITA	Roberta Vinci	18	1
RUS	Maria Kirilenko	20	2
ESP	Anabel Medina Garrigues	26	3
CZE	Petra Cetkovská	30	4
CHN	Zheng Jie	32	5
EST	Kaia Kanepi	33	6
RUS	Nadia Petrova	34	7
~~GER~~	~~Mona Barthel~~	~~35~~	~~8~~
SLO	Polona Hercog	36	9

- Seedings are based on the rankings of April 23, 2012

=== Other entrants ===
The following players received wildcards into the main draw:

- (Russia) Nina Bratchikova
- (Portugal) Maria João Koehler
- (Portugal) Bárbara Luz

The following players received entry from the qualifying draw:

- (Germany) Kristina Barrois
- (Italy) Karin Knapp
- (Spain) María Teresa Torró Flor
- (United Kingdom) Heather Watson

The following player received entry as lucky loser:

- (United States) Sloane Stephens

=== Withdrawals ===
- (Germany) Mona Barthel (left foot injury)

=== Retirements ===
- (Australia) Jarmila Gajdošová (left ankle injury)
- (Slovenia) Polona Hercog (right foot injury)

== WTA doubles main-draw entrants ==
=== Seeds ===
Country	Player	Country	Player	Rank^{1}	Seed
~~RUS~~	~~Maria Kirilenko~~	~~RUS~~	~~Nadia Petrova~~	~~23~~	~~1~~
IND	Sania Mirza	AUS	Anastasia Rodionova	27	2
KAZ	Yaroslava Shvedova	KAZ	Galina Voskoboeva	35	3
AUS	Jarmila Gajdošová	CZE	Andrea Hlaváčková	43	4

- ^{1} Rankings are as of April 23, 2012

=== Other entrants ===
The following pairs received wildcards into the doubles main draw:

- (Russia) Ekaterina Ivanova / (Portugal) Maria João Koehler
- (Portugal) Margarida Moura / (Portugal) Joana Valle Costa

The following pairs received entry as alternates:

- (Spain) Estrella Cabeza Candela / (Portugal) Bárbara Luz

=== Withdrawals ===
- (Russia) Maria Kirilenko (right ankle injury)

=== Retirements ===
- (Australia) Jarmila Gajdošová (left ankle injury)

== Finals ==
=== Men's singles ===
- (Argentina) Juan Martín del Potro defeated (France) Richard Gasquet, 6–4, 6–2
- It was del Potro's 2nd title of the year and 11th of his career. It was his 2nd win at Estoril, defending his title.

=== Women's singles ===
- (Estonia) Kaia Kanepi defeated (Spain) Carla Suárez Navarro, 3–6, 7–6^{(8–6)}, 6–4
- It was Kanepi's 2nd title of the year and 3rd of her career.

=== Men's doubles ===
- (Pakistan) Aisam-ul-Haq Qureshi / (Netherlands) Jean-Julien Rojer defeated (Austria) Julian Knowle / (Spain) David Marrero, 7–5, 7–5

=== Women's doubles ===
- (Chinese Taipei) Chuang Chia-jung / (China) Zhang Shuai defeated (Kazakhstan) Yaroslava Shvedova / (Kazakhstan) Galina Voskoboeva, 4–6, 6–1, [11–9]
