= 2013 Portugal Open – Women's doubles =

Women's doubles
- 2013 Portugal Open

Final
- Champions: (Chinese Taipei) Chan Hao-ching (France) Kristina Mladenovic
- Runners-up: (Croatia) Darija Jurak (Hungary) Katalin Marosi
- Score: 7–6^{(7–3)}, 6–2

Events
Singles	men	women
Doubles	men	women
← 2012 ·	Portugal Open	· 2014 →

Chuang Chia-jung and Zhang Shuai were the defending champions, but decided not to participate.

Chan Hao-ching and Kristina Mladenovic won the title, defeating Darija Jurak and Katalin Marosi in the final, 7–6^{(7–3)}, 6–2.

== Seeds ==
1. (United States) Raquel Kops-Jones / (United States) Abigail Spears (semifinals)
2. (Chinese Taipei) Chan Hao-ching / (France) Kristina Mladenovic (champions)
3. (South Africa) Natalie Grandin / (Czech Republic) Vladimíra Uhlířová (first round)
4. (Croatia) Darija Jurak / (Hungary) Katalin Marosi (final)

== Draw ==
=== Key ===
- Q = Qualifier
- WC = Wild card
- LL = Lucky loser
- Alt = Alternate
- SE = Special exempt
- PR = Protected ranking
- ITF = ITF entry
- JE = Junior exempt
- w/o = Walkover
- r = Retired
- d = Defaulted
- SR = Special ranking

First round
1	(United States) R Kops-Jones (United States) A Spears	7	6
(Zimbabwe) C Black (Colombia) C Castaño	5	3
(France) S Foretz Gacon (Czech Republic) E Hrdinová	6	6
(New Zealand) M Erakovic (United Kingdom) L Robson	3	3
4	(Croatia) D Jurak (Hungary) K Marosi	2	7	[13]
(United States) V King (Romania) M Niculescu	6	5	[11]
(Austria) T Paszek (Georgia (country)) A Tatishvili	5	6	[10]
(United States) M Moulton-Levy (Poland) A Rosolska	7	4	[6]
(Russia) A Kudryavtseva (Australia) A Rodionova	6	4	[10]
(Brazil) T Pereira (Russia) V Savinykh	4	6	[4]
(Austria) S Klemenschits (Poland) K Piter	6	6
3	(South Africa) N Grandin (Czech Republic) V Uhlířová	4	0
WC	(Portugal) S Araújo (Portugal) J Valle Costa	2	2
(Russia) N Bratchikova (United States) V Lepchenko	6	6
WC	(Russia) D Gavrilova (Portugal) B Luz	3	6	[2]
2	(Chinese Taipei) H-c Chan (France) K Mladenovic	6	4	[10]

Quarterfinals
1	(United States) R Kops-Jones (United States) A Spears	6	4	[10]
(France) S Foretz Gacon (Czech Republic) E Hrdinová	4	6	[4]
4	(Croatia) D Jurak (Hungary) K Marosi	6	6
(Austria) T Paszek (Georgia (country)) A Tatishvili	4	3
(Russia) A Kudryavtseva (Australia) A Rodionova	6	7
(Austria) S Klemenschits (Poland) K Piter	0	5
(Russia) N Bratchikova (United States) V Lepchenko	2	1
2	(Chinese Taipei) H-c Chan (France) K Mladenovic	6	6

Semifinals
1	(United States) R Kops-Jones (United States) A Spears	6	1	[8]
4	(Croatia) D Jurak (Hungary) K Marosi	3	6	[10]
(Russia) A Kudryavtseva (Australia) A Rodionova	3	4
2	(Chinese Taipei) H-c Chan (France) K Mladenovic	6	6

Final
4	(Croatia) D Jurak (Hungary) K Marosi	6^{3}	2
2	(Chinese Taipei) H-c Chan (France) K Mladenovic	7^{7}	6
