= 2012 Estoril Open – Men's singles =

Men's singles
- 2012 Estoril Open

Final
- Champion: (Argentina) Juan Martín del Potro
- Runner-up: (France) Richard Gasquet
- Score: 6–4, 6–2

Events
Singles	men	women
Doubles	men	women
← 2011 ·	Estoril Open	· 2013 →

Juan Martín del Potro defended the title by winning 6–4, 6–2 against Richard Gasquet.

== Seeds ==
The top four seeds receive a bye into the second round.

1. (Argentina) Juan Martín del Potro (champion)
2. (France) Richard Gasquet (final)
3. (Switzerland) Stanislas Wawrinka (semifinals)
4. (Spain) Albert Ramos (semifinals)
5. (Uzbekistan) Denis Istomin (second round, retired)
6. (Netherlands) Robin Haase (quarterfinals)
7. (Spain) Albert Montañés (quarterfinals)
8. (Italy) Flavio Cipolla (second round)

== Draw ==
=== Key ===
- Q = Qualifier
- WC = Wild card
- LL = Lucky loser
- Alt = Alternate
- SE = Special exempt
- PR = Protected ranking
- ITF = ITF entry
- JE = Junior exempt
- w/o = Walkover
- r = Retired
- d = Defaulted
- SR = Special ranking

=== Finals ===
Semifinals
1	(Argentina) Juan Martín del Potro	7^{7}	6
3	(Switzerland) Stanislas Wawrinka	6^{2}	4
4	(Spain) Albert Ramos	6	6^{1}	5
2	(France) Richard Gasquet	2	7^{7}	7

Final
1	(Argentina) Juan Martín del Potro	6	6
2	(France) Richard Gasquet	4	2

=== Top half ===
First round
WC	(Portugal) P Sousa	7^{7}	1	2
(Portugal) R Machado	6^{3}	6	6
SE	(Hungary) A Balázs	3	4
(United States) B Reynolds	6	6
(Australia) M Ebden	2	3
7	(Spain) A Montañés	6	6
Q	(Spain) I Navarro	7^{7}	6
(Spain) D Gimeno Traver	6^{5}	2
(Russia) I Andreev	4	6	3
Q	(Spain) I Cervantes	6	3	6
(Italy) S Bolelli	3	2
6	(Netherlands) R Haase	6	6

Second round
1	(Argentina) JM del Potro	6	6
(Portugal) R Machado	1	0
(United States) B Reynolds	6	4	3
7	(Spain) A Montañés	4	6	6
3	(Switzerland) S Wawrinka	7^{7}	6
Q	(Spain) I Navarro	6^{5}	1
Q	(Spain) I Cervantes	7	4	2
6	(Netherlands) R Haase	5	6	6

Quarterfinals
1	(Argentina) JM del Potro	6	6
7	(Spain) A Montañés	2	2
3	(Switzerland) S Wawrinka	6	6
6	(Netherlands) R Haase	1	4

Semifinals
1	(Argentina) JM del Potro	7^{7}	6
3	(Switzerland) S Wawrinka	6^{2}	4

=== Bottom half ===
First round
5	(Uzbekistan) D Istomin	7	6
PR	(France) P-H Mathieu	5	1
WC	(Portugal) J Sousa	5	6	6
WC	(Portugal) G Elias	7	4	2
(Germany) B Phau	6	6
(Portugal) F Gil	4	2
8	(Italy) F Cipolla	6	6
(Argentina) D Junqueira	1	4
Q	(Spain) D Muñoz de la Nava	7	6
Q	(Spain) J Martí	5	3
(Italy) P Lorenzi	3	7^{7}	6
(France) É Roger-Vasselin	6	6^{2}	4

Second round
5	(Uzbekistan) D Istomin	6	3	2^{r}
WC	(Portugal) J Sousa	3	6	4
(Germany) B Phau	5	0
4	(Spain) A Ramos	7	6
8	(Italy) F Cipolla	4	4
Q	(Spain) D Muñoz de la Nava	6	6
(Italy) P Lorenzi	1	1
2	(France) R Gasquet	6	6

Quarterfinals
WC	(Portugal) J Sousa	2	3
4	(Spain) A Ramos	6	6
Q	(Spain) D Muñoz de la Nava	6^{1}	2
2	(France) R Gasquet	7^{7}	6

Semifinals
4	(Spain) A Ramos	6	6^{1}	5
2	(France) R Gasquet	2	7^{7}	7

== Qualifying ==
=== Seeds ===
1. (Spain) Daniel Muñoz de la Nava (qualified)
2. (Spain) Javier Martí (qualified)
3. (Spain) Íñigo Cervantes Huegun (qualified)
4. (Spain) Iván Navarro (qualified)
5. (Kazakhstan) Evgeny Korolev (first round)
6. (Republic of Ireland) James McGee (second round)
7. (Netherlands) Nick van der Meer (first round, retired)
8. (Spain) Sergio Gutiérrez Ferrol (qualifying competition)

=== Qualifiers ===
1. (Spain) Daniel Muñoz de la Nava
2. (Spain) Javier Martí
3. (Spain) Íñigo Cervantes
4. (Spain) Iván Navarro

=== Draw ===
==== First qualifier ====
First round
1	(Spain) Daniel Muñoz de la Nava	6	6
WC	(Portugal) Gonçalo Pereira	0	0
WC	(Portugal) Artur Completo	3	1
(Portugal) José-Ricardo Nunes	6	6
(Spain) Rafael Mazón-Hernández	1	0
(Spain) David Marrero	6	6
WC	(Portugal) Romain Barbosa	1	2
8	(Spain) Sergio Gutiérrez Ferrol	6	6

Second round
1	(Spain) Daniel Muñoz de la Nava	6	6
(Portugal) José-Ricardo Nunes	3	1
(Spain) David Marrero	3	7^{7}	5
8	(Spain) Sergio Gutiérrez Ferrol	6	6^{3}	7

Qualifying competition
1	(Spain) Daniel Muñoz de la Nava	6	6
8	(Spain) Sergio Gutiérrez Ferrol	3	4

==== Second qualifier ====
First round
2	(Spain) Javier Martí	6	6
WC	(Portugal) João Barra	1	0
(Poland) Tomasz Bednarek	7	6
(Portugal) Gonçalo Falcão	5	2
(Portugal) Martin Trueva	6^{4}	6	4
(New Zealand) Sebastian Lavie	7^{7}	3	6
(Spain) Enrique López Pérez	6	6^{10}	1
7	(Netherlands) Nick van der Meer	3	7^{12}	2^{r}

Second round
2	(Spain) Javier Martí	6	6
(Poland) Tomasz Bednarek	3	0
(New Zealand) Sebastian Lavie	6	6
(Spain) Enrique López Pérez	4	4

Qualifying competition
2	(Spain) Javier Martí	6	6
(New Zealand) Sebastian Lavie	0	2

==== Third qualifier ====
First round
3	(Spain) Íñigo Cervantes	6	6
(Portugal) Frederico Ferreira Silva	1	4
(Portugal) Vasco Pascoal	3	0
(Russia) Mikhail Elgin	6	6
(Switzerland) Henri Laaksonen	3	6	6
(Spain) David Estruch	6	2	2
WC	(Portugal) Henrique Sousa	0	2
6	(Republic of Ireland) James McGee	6	6

Second round
3	(Spain) Íñigo Cervantes	4	6	6
(Russia) Mikhail Elgin	6	3	3
(Switzerland) Henri Laaksonen	7^{7}	6
6	(Republic of Ireland) James McGee	6^{5}	2

Qualifying competition
3	(Spain) Íñigo Cervantes	6	4	6
(Switzerland) Henri Laaksonen	3	6	2

==== Fourth qualifier ====
First round
4	(Spain) Iván Navarro	6	4	6
(Portugal) Leonardo Tavares	3	6	4
(Portugal) Gonçalo Loureiro	2	1
(Portugal) João Domingues	6	6
WC	(Portugal) Vasco Mensurado	7	6
WC	(Portugal) Diogo Rocha	5	2
(Spain) Roberto Ortega Olmedo	6^{6}	6	6
5	(Kazakhstan) Evgeny Korolev	7^{8}	4	1

Second round
4	(Spain) Iván Navarro	6	6
(Portugal) João Domingues	3	3
WC	(Portugal) Vasco Mensurado	3	4
(Spain) Roberto Ortega Olmedo	6	6

Qualifying competition
4	(Spain) Iván Navarro	7	6
(Spain) Roberto Ortega Olmedo	5	2
