= 2012 Estoril Open – Women's singles =

Women's singles
- 2012 Estoril Open

Final
- Champion: (Estonia) Kaia Kanepi
- Runner-up: (Spain) Carla Suárez Navarro
- Score: 3–6, 7–6^{(8–6)}, 6–4

Events
| Singles | men | women |
| Doubles | men | women |
- Estoril Open

Anabel Medina Garrigues was the defending champion, but lost in the second round to Sílvia Soler Espinosa.

Kaia Kanepi won the tournament, defeating in the final Carla Suárez Navarro 3–6, 7–6^{(8–6)}, 6–4.

== Seeds ==
1. (Italy) Roberta Vinci (semifinals)
2. (Russia) Maria Kirilenko (second round)
3. (Spain) Anabel Medina Garrigues (second round)
4. (Czech Republic) Petra Cetkovská (quarterfinals)
5. (China) Zheng Jie (second round)
6. (Estonia) Kaia Kanepi (champion)
7. (Russia) Nadia Petrova (quarterfinals)
8. (Germany) Mona Barthel (withdrew because of a left foot injury)
9. (Slovenia) Polona Hercog (second round, retired)

== Draw ==
Key

- Q = Qualifier
- WC = Wild card
- LL = Lucky loser
- Alt = Alternate
- ITF = ITF entry
- PR = Protected ranking
- SR = Special ranking
- SE = Special exempt
- JE = Junior exempt
- JR = Junior Accelerator Programme entrant
- CO = College Accelerator Programme entrant
- NG = Next Gen Accelerator Program entrant
- w/o = Walkover
- r = Retired
- d = Defaulted

=== Finals ===
Semifinals
1 | (Italy) Roberta Vinci | 2 | 5
6 | (Estonia) Kaia Kanepi | 6 | 7
(Spain) Carla Suárez Navarro | 6 | 6
Q | (Italy) Karin Knapp | 4 | 0

Final
6 | (Estonia) Kaia Kanepi | 3 | 7^{8} | 6
(Spain) Carla Suárez Navarro | 6 | 6^{6} | 4

=== Top half ===
First round
1 | (Italy) R Vinci | 6 | 1 | 6
WC | (Russia) N Bratchikova | 1 | 6 | 4
(Japan) A Morita | 1 | 5
WC | (Portugal) MJ Koehler | 6 | 7
Q | (Spain) M-T Torró-Flor | 3 | 1
(Australia) J Gajdošová | 6 | 6
WC | (Portugal) B Luz | 0 | 1
7 | (Russia) N Petrova | 6 | 6
4 | (Czech Republic) P Cetkovská | 6 | 6
(Russia) A Panova | 2 | 1
Q | (United Kingdom) H Watson | 6 | 6
(Czech Republic) L Hradecká | 4 | 4
(United States) V King | 6^{6} | 6 | 6
(Sweden) J Larsson | 7^{8} | 3 | 0
LL | (United States) S Stephens | 1 | 0
6 | (Estonia) K Kanepi | 6 | 6

Second round
1 | (Italy) R Vinci | 6 | 6
WC | (Portugal) MJ Koehler | 2 | 0
(Australia) J Gajdošová | 6^{2} | r
7 | (Russia) N Petrova | 7^{7}
4 | (Czech Republic) P Cetkovská | 6 | 6
Q | (United Kingdom) H Watson | 3 | 1
(United States) V King | 3 | 4
6 | (Estonia) K Kanepi | 6 | 6

Quarterfinals
1 | (Italy) R Vinci | 6 | 1 | 6
7 | (Russia) N Petrova | 2 | 6 | 4
4 | (Czech Republic) P Cetkovská | 3 | 6 | 3
6 | (Estonia) K Kanepi | 6 | 3 | 6

Semifinals
1 | (Italy) R Vinci | 2 | 5
6 | (Estonia) K Kanepi | 6 | 7

=== Bottom half ===
First round
9 | (Slovenia) P Hercog | 6 | 6
(Austria) T Paszek | 0 | 3
(Belarus) O Govortsova | 4 | 4
(Spain) C Suárez Navarro | 6 | 6
(Romania) S Cîrstea | 4 | 4
(Spain) S Soler Espinosa | 6 | 6
Q | (Germany) K Barrois | 4 | 1
3 | (Spain) A Medina Garrigues | 6 | 6
5 | (China) J Zheng | 6 | 6
(Russia) E Makarova | 3 | 1
(Belarus) A Yakimova | 1 | 4
(Kazakhstan) G Voskoboeva | 6 | 6
(Greece) E Daniilidou | 5 | 2
Q | (Italy) K Knapp | 7 | 6
(United Kingdom) E Baltacha | 6^{6} | 1
2 | (Russia) M Kirilenko | 7^{8} | 6

Second round
9 | (Slovenia) P Hercog | 4 | 0^{r}
(Spain) C Suárez Navarro | 6 | 3
(Spain) S Soler Espinosa | 3 | 6 | 7
3 | (Spain) A Medina Garrigues | 6 | 3 | 5
5 | (China) J Zheng | 4 | 1
(Kazakhstan) G Voskoboeva | 6 | 6
Q | (Italy) K Knapp | 1 | 6 | 7
2 | (Russia) M Kirilenko | 6 | 1 | 5

Quarterfinals
(Spain) C Suárez Navarro | 6 | 6
(Spain) S Soler Espinosa | 3 | 3
(Kazakhstan) G Voskoboeva | 6^{4} | 6 | 4
Q | (Italy) K Knapp | 7^{7} | 2 | 6

Semifinals
(Spain) C Suárez Navarro | 6 | 6
Q | (Italy) K Knapp | 4 | 0

== Qualifying ==
=== Seeds ===
1. (United States) Sloane Stephens (qualifying competition, lucky loser)
2. (France) Stéphanie Foretz Gacon (second round)
3. (Australia) Anastasia Rodionova (second round)
4. (Netherlands) Arantxa Rus (first round)
5. (United Kingdom) Heather Watson (qualified)
6. (Czech Republic) Andrea Hlaváčková (first round)
7. (Kazakhstan) Sesil Karatantcheva (second round)
8. (Spain) Lara Arruabarrena Vecino (qualifying competition)

=== Qualifiers ===
1. (United Kingdom) Heather Watson
2. (Italy) Karin Knapp
3. (Spain) María-Teresa Torró-Flor
4. (Germany) Kristina Barrois

=== Lucky loser ===
1. (United States) Sloane Stephens

=== Qualifying draw ===
==== First qualifier ====
First round
1 | (United States) Sloane Stephens | 6 | 6
WC | (Portugal) Margarida Moura | 0 | 1
(Kazakhstan) Yaroslava Shvedova | 6^{5} | 4
(Peru) Bianca Botto | 7^{7} | 6
(China) Zhang Shuai | 6 | 7
WC | (Latvia) Anastasija Sevastova | 4 | 5
(France) Caroline Garcia | 1 | 1
5 | (United Kingdom) Heather Watson | 6 | 6

Second round
1 | (United States) Sloane Stephens | 6 | 6
(Peru) Bianca Botto | 4 | 2
(China) Zhang Shuai | 4 | 1
5 | (United Kingdom) Heather Watson | 6 | 6

Qualifying competition
1 | (United States) Sloane Stephens | 6 | 4 | 2
5 | (United Kingdom) Heather Watson | 4 | 6 | 6

==== Second qualifier ====
First round
2 | (France) Stéphanie Foretz Gacon | 7 | 7
(Serbia) Aleksandra Krunić | 5 | 5
(Italy) Karin Knapp | 6 | 6
(Italy) Nastassja Burnett | 3 | 1
(France) Claire Feuerstein | 2 | 6^{1}
(Colombia) Mariana Duque Mariño | 6 | 7^{7}
(Italy) Maria Elena Camerin | 6 | 1 | 2
7 | (Kazakhstan) Sesil Karatantcheva | 3 | 6 | 6

Second round
2 | (France) Stéphanie Foretz Gacon | 3 | 2
(Italy) Karin Knapp | 6 | 6
(Colombia) Mariana Duque Mariño | 1 | 6 | 6
7 | (Kazakhstan) Sesil Karatantcheva | 6 | 3 | 1

Qualifying competition
(Italy) Karin Knapp | 6 | 7^{7}
(Colombia) Mariana Duque Mariño | 3 | 6^{3}

==== Third qualifier ====
First round
3 | (Australia) Anastasia Rodionova | 6 | 7^{7}
(Germany) Annika Beck | 2 | 6^{3}
(Slovenia) Petra Rampre | 6^{7} | 1
(Spain) María-Teresa Torró-Flor | 7^{9} | 6
(Russia) Ekaterina Ivanova | 6 | 6
WC | (Portugal) Rita Vilaça | 3 | 0
(Spain) Estrella Cabeza Candela | 6 | 6
6 | (Czech Republic) Andrea Hlaváčková | 3 | 4

Second round
3 | (Australia) Anastasia Rodionova | 2 | 3
(Spain) María-Teresa Torró-Flor | 6 | 6
(Russia) Ekaterina Ivanova | 0 | 2
(Spain) Estrella Cabeza Candela | 6 | 6

Qualifying competition
(Spain) María-Teresa Torró-Flor | 6 | 6
(Spain) Estrella Cabeza Candela | 3 | 3

==== Fourth qualifier ====
First round
4 | (Netherlands) Arantxa Rus | 3 | 1
Alt | (United States) Abigail Spears | 6 | 6
(Bulgaria) Elitsa Kostova | 4 | 2
(Germany) Kristina Barrois | 6 | 6
(France) Laura Thorpe | 6 | 4 | 6
WC | (Portugal) Sofia Araújo | 2 | 6 | 2
(France) Aravane Rezaï | 3 | 4
8 | (Spain) Lara Arruabarrena Vecino | 6 | 6

Second round
Alt | (United States) Abigail Spears | 2 | 5
(Germany) Kristina Barrois | 6 | 7
(France) Laura Thorpe | 4 | 1
8 | (Spain) Lara Arruabarrena Vecino | 6 | 6

Qualifying competition
(Germany) Kristina Barrois | 6 | 2 | 6
8 | (Spain) Lara Arruabarrena Vecino | 4 | 6 | 2
