= 2013 Portugal Open – Men's doubles =

Men's doubles
- 2013 Portugal Open

Final
- Champions: (Mexico) Santiago González (United States) Scott Lipsky
- Runners-up: (Pakistan) Aisam-ul-Haq Qureshi (Netherlands) Jean-Julien Rojer
- Score: 6–3, 4–6, [10–7]

Events
Singles	men	women
Doubles	men	women
← 2012 ·	Portugal Open	· 2014 →

Aisam-ul-Haq Qureshi and Jean-Julien Rojer were the defending champions but lost in the final to Santiago González and Scott Lipsky, 3–6, 6–4, [7–10].

== Seeds ==
1. (Pakistan) Aisam-ul-Haq Qureshi / (Netherlands) Jean-Julien Rojer (final)
2. (Spain) David Marrero / (Brazil) Marcelo Melo (semifinals)
3. (Mexico) Santiago González / (United States) Scott Lipsky (champions)
4. (Italy) Daniele Bracciali / (Italy) Fabio Fognini (semifinals)

== Draw ==
=== Key ===
- Q = Qualifier
- WC = Wild card
- LL = Lucky loser
- Alt = Alternate
- SE = Special exempt
- PR = Protected ranking
- ITF = ITF entry
- JE = Junior exempt
- w/o = Walkover
- r = Retired
- d = Defaulted
- SR = Special ranking

=== Draw ===
First round
1	(Pakistan) A-u-H Qureshi (Netherlands) J-J Rojer	6	4	[10]
(Italy) P Lorenzi (Italy) A Seppi	3	6	[6]
(Israel) J Erlich (United Kingdom) D Inglot	3^{r}
(India) R Bopanna (Israel) A Ram	5
4	(Italy) D Bracciali (Italy) F Fognini	6	7^{8}
(Germany) P Marx (Romania) F Mergea	4	6^{6}
WC	(Portugal) F Gil (Portugal) P Sousa	6	6
(United Kingdom) J Murray (Australia) J Peers	4	4
(France) B Paire (France) É Roger-Vasselin	3	4
Alt	(Russia) E Donskoy (Russia) A Kuznetsov	6	6
(Netherlands) R Haase (Netherlands) I Sijsling	6	6^{5}	[4]
3	(Mexico) S González (United States) S Lipsky	4	7^{7}	[10]
(Russia) M Elgin (Uzbekistan) D Istomin	6	7^{7}
(Spain) D Gimeno-Traver (Argentina) H Zeballos	3	6^{2}
WC	(Portugal) FF Silva (Portugal) L Tavares	1	1
2	(Spain) D Marrero (Brazil) M Melo	6	6

Quarterfinals
1	(Pakistan) A-u-H Qureshi (Netherlands) J-J Rojer	4	6	[10]
(India) R Bopanna (Israel) A Ram	6	3	[4]
4	(Italy) D Bracciali (Italy) F Fognini	6	6
WC	(Portugal) F Gil (Portugal) P Sousa	3	4
Alt	(Russia) E Donskoy (Russia) A Kuznetsov	4	2
3	(Mexico) S González (United States) S Lipsky	6	6
(Russia) M Elgin (Uzbekistan) D Istomin	6^{2}	6	[3]
2	(Spain) D Marrero (Brazil) M Melo	7^{7}	3	[10]

Semifinals
1	(Pakistan) A-u-H Qureshi (Netherlands) J-J Rojer	6	4	[10]
4	(Italy) D Bracciali (Italy) F Fognini	4	6	[6]
3	(Mexico) S González (United States) S Lipsky	6	1	[11]
2	(Spain) D Marrero (Brazil) M Melo	3	6	[9]

Final
1	(Pakistan) A-u-H Qureshi (Netherlands) J-J Rojer	3	6	[7]
3	(Mexico) S González (United States) S Lipsky	6	4	[10]
