= 2012 Estoril Open – Men's doubles =

Men's doubles
- 2012 Estoril Open

Final
- Champions: (Pakistan) Aisam-ul-Haq Qureshi; (Netherlands) Jean-Julien Rojer
- Runners-up: (Austria) Julian Knowle; (Spain) David Marrero
- Score: 7–5, 7–5

Events
Singles	men	women
Doubles	men	women
← 2011 ·	Estoril Open	· 2013 →

Eric Butorac and Jean-Julien Rojer were the defending champions but decided not to participate together.
Butorac plays alongside Bruno Soares, while Rojer partners up with Aisam-ul-Haq Qureshi.
Aisam-ul-Haq Qureshi and Jean-Julien Rojer won the title defeating Julian Knowle and David Marrero 7–5, 7–5 in the final.

== Seeds ==
1. (Pakistan) Aisam-ul-Haq Qureshi / (Netherlands) Jean-Julien Rojer (champions)
2. (United States) Eric Butorac / (Brazil) Bruno Soares (first round)
3. (Australia) Paul Hanley / (Brazil) Marcelo Melo (quarterfinals)
4. (Austria) Julian Knowle / (Spain) David Marrero (final)

== Draw ==
=== Key ===
- Q = Qualifier
- WC = Wild card
- LL = Lucky loser
- Alt = Alternate
- SE = Special exempt
- PR = Protected ranking
- ITF = ITF entry
- JE = Junior exempt
- w/o = Walkover
- r = Retired
- d = Defaulted
- SR = Special ranking

=== Draw ===
First round

Quarterfinals

Semifinals

Final

1
(Pakistan) A-u-H Qureshi
(Netherlands) J-J Rojer
6
4
[10]

WC
- (Portugal) G Elias
- (Portugal) J Sousa
3
6
[4]

1
- (Pakistan) A-u-H Qureshi
- (Netherlands) J-J Rojer
4
6
[10]

- (Italy) S Bolelli
- (Spain) A Ramos
1
3

- (Philippines) TC Huey
- (United Kingdom) D Inglot
6
4
[5]

(Philippines) TC Huey
(United Kingdom) D Inglot
6
6

1
(Pakistan) A-u-H Qureshi
(Netherlands) J-J Rojer
6
6

3
(Australia) P Hanley
(Brazil) M Melo
7^{12}
3
[10]

- (France) R Gasquet
3
1

- (United Kingdom) J Delgado
- (United Kingdom) K Skupski
6^{10}
6
[6]

3
- (Australia) P Hanley
- (Brazil) M Melo
7
1
[1]

- (Poland) T Bednarek
- (Australia) M Ebden
3
6
[9]

(France) R Gasquet
(France) É Roger-Vasselin
5
6
[10]

- (France) R Gasquet
6
4
[11]

1
(Pakistan) A-u-H Qureshi
(Netherlands) J-J Rojer
7
7

WC
- (Portugal) F Gil
- (Portugal) P Sousa
4
4

4
- (Austria) J Knowle
- (Spain) D Marrero
5
5

(France) O Charroin
(United Kingdom) J Marray
6
6

- (France) O Charroin
- (United Kingdom) J Marray
5
4

- (Italy) F Cipolla
- (Italy) P Lorenzi
2
6
[9]

4
(Austria) J Knowle
(Spain) D Marrero
7
6

4
(Austria) J Knowle
(Spain) D Marrero
6
3
[11]

4
(Austria) J Knowle
(Spain) D Marrero
7^{7}
5
[10]

- (United States) JP Fruttero
- (South Africa) R Klaasen
6^{6}
3

- (Russia) M Elgin
- (Uzbekistan) D Istomin
6^{4}
7
[6]

(Sweden) J Brunström
(Germany) P Marx
7^{8}
6

- (Sweden) J Brunström
- (Germany) P Marx
4
4

(Russia) M Elgin
(Uzbekistan) D Istomin
6
6

(Russia) M Elgin
(Uzbekistan) D Istomin
6
6

2
- (United States) E Butorac
- (Brazil) B Soares
2
4
