= 2012 Estoril Open – Women's doubles =

Women's doubles
- 2012 Estoril Open

Final
- Champions: (Chinese Taipei) Chuang Chia-jung; (China) Zhang Shuai
- Runners-up: (Kazakhstan) Yaroslava Shvedova; (Kazakhstan) Galina Voskoboeva
- Score: 4–6, 6–1, [11–9]

Events
Singles	men	women
Doubles	men	women
- Estoril Open

Alisa Kleybanova and Galina Voskoboeva were the defending champions but Kleybanova did not participate. Voskoboeva played alongside compatriot Yaroslava Shvedova, but they lost in the final against Chuang Chia-jung and Zhang Shuai, 4–6, 6–1, [11–9].

== Seeds ==
1. (Russia) Maria Kirilenko / (Russia) Nadia Petrova (withdrew because of Kirilenko's right ankle injury)
2. (India) Sania Mirza / (Australia) Anastasia Rodionova (semifinals)
3. (Kazakhstan) Yaroslava Shvedova / (Kazakhstan) Galina Voskoboeva (final)
4. (Australia) Jarmila Gajdošová / (Czech Republic) Andrea Hlaváčková (quarterfinals, withdrew because of Gajdošová's injury)

== Draw ==
Key

- Q = Qualifier
- WC = Wild card
- LL = Lucky loser
- Alt = Alternate
- ITF = ITF entry
- PR = Protected ranking
- SR = Special ranking
- SE = Special exempt
- JE = Junior exempt
- JR = Junior Accelerator Programme entrant
- CO = College Accelerator Programme entrant
- NG = Next Gen Accelerator Program entrant
- w/o = Walkover
- r = Retired
- d = Defaulted

First round

Quarterfinals

Semifinals

Final

Alt
- (Spain) E Cabeza Candela
- (Portugal) B Luz
6^{2}
2

(United States) R Kops-Jones
(United States) A Spears
7^{7}
6

- (United States) R Kops-Jones
- (United States) A Spears
4
1

- (Germany) K Barrois
- (Germany) J Wöhr
2
0

- (Russia) A Panova
- (United Kingdom) H Watson
6
6

(Russia) A Panova
(United Kingdom) H Watson
6
6

- (Russia) A Panova
- (United Kingdom) H Watson
3
3

4
(Australia) J Gajdošová
(Czech Republic) A Hlaváčková
6
5
[11]

(Chinese Taipei) C-j Chuang
(China) S Zhang
6
6

- (France) S Foretz Gacon
- (Poland) K Jans-Ignacik
1
7
[9]

4
- (Australia) J Gajdošová
- (Czech Republic) A Hlaváčková

(Chinese Taipei) C-j Chuang
(China) S Zhang
6
6

- (Chinese Taipei) C-j Chuang
- (China) S Zhang
w/o

WC
- (Portugal) M Moura
- (Portugal) J Valle Costa
0
1

(Chinese Taipei) C-j Chuang
(China) S Zhang
4
6
[11]

WC
- (Russia) E Ivanova
- (Portugal) MJ Koehler
6^{7}
6
[4]

3
(Kazakhstan) Y Shvedova
(Kazakhstan) G Voskoboeva
6
1
[9]

(Russia) N Bratchikova
(Croatia) D Jurak
7^{9}
2
[10]

- (Russia) N Bratchikova
- (Croatia) D Jurak
5
3

- (Italy) ME Camerin
- (Italy) K Knapp
3
1

3
(Kazakhstan) Y Shvedova
(Kazakhstan) G Voskoboeva
7
6

3
(Kazakhstan) Y Shvedova
(Kazakhstan) G Voskoboeva
6
6

3
(Kazakhstan) Y Shvedova
(Kazakhstan) G Voskoboeva
6
7^{8}

- (Spain) L Arruabarrena
- (Spain) A Medina Garrigues
6^{5}
6
[9]

2
- (India) S Mirza
- (Australia) A Rodionova
3
6^{6}

(United States) L Lee-Waters
(United States) M Moulton-Levy
7^{7}
3
[11]

- (United States) L Lee-Waters
0
4

- (Greece) E Daniilidou
- (Slovenia) A Klepač
2
7^{7}
[5]

2
- (India) S Mirza
- (Australia) A Rodionova
6
6

2
(India) S Mirza
(Australia) A Rodionova
6
6^{5}
[10]
