= 2013 Portugal Open – Women's singles =

Women's singles
- 2013 Portugal Open

Final
- Champion: (Russia) Anastasia Pavlyuchenkova
- Runner-up: (Spain) Carla Suárez Navarro
- Score: 7–5, 6–2

Events
Singles	men	women
Doubles	men	women
- Portugal Open

Kaia Kanepi was the defending champion, but she lost in the semifinals to Carla Suárez Navarro.

Anastasia Pavlyuchenkova won the title, defeating Suárez Navarro in the final, 7–5, 6–2.

== Seeds ==
1. (France) Marion Bartoli (first round)
2. (Slovakia) Dominika Cibulková (first round)
3. (Russia) Anastasia Pavlyuchenkova (champion)
4. (Spain) Carla Suárez Navarro (final)
5. (Romania) Sorana Cîrstea (second round)
6. (United States) Varvara Lepchenko (first round)
7. (Russia) Elena Vesnina (quarterfinals)
8. (Germany) Julia Görges (first round)

== Draw ==
Key

- Q = Qualifier
- WC = Wild card
- LL = Lucky loser
- Alt = Alternate
- ITF = ITF entry
- PR = Protected ranking
- SR = Special ranking
- SE = Special exempt
- JE = Junior exempt
- JR = Junior Accelerator Programme entrant
- CO = College Accelerator Programme entrant
- NG = Next Gen Accelerator Program entrant
- w/o = Walkover
- r = Retired
- d = Defaulted

=== Finals ===
Semifinals
(Switzerland) Romina Oprandi	6	3	1
3	(Russia) Anastasia Pavlyuchenkova	0	6	6
4	(Spain) Carla Suárez Navarro	6	6
(Estonia) Kaia Kanepi	4	1

Final
3	(Russia) Anastasia Pavlyuchenkova	7	6
4	(Spain) Carla Suárez Navarro	5	2

=== Top half ===
First round
1	(France) M Bartoli	0	6	4
(China) S Peng	6	1	6
(Netherlands) K Bertens	3	3
(Switzerland) R Oprandi	6	6
(Sweden) S Arvidsson	3	4
Q	(Kazakhstan) G Voskoboeva	6	6
WC	(Russia) S Kuznetsova	6^{2}	6	6
6	(United States) V Lepchenko	7^{7}	3	2
3	(Russia) A Pavlyuchenkova	6	6
Q	(Israel) S Pe'er	4	4
Q	(France) A Rezaï	7	1	3
Q	(Spain) E Cabeza Candela	5	6	6
(Romania) M Niculescu	6	6
(Austria) T Paszek	1	3
WC	(Portugal) MJ Koehler	4	1
7	(Russia) E Vesnina	6	6

Second round
(China) S Peng	1	3
(Switzerland) R Oprandi	6	6
Q	(Kazakhstan) G Voskoboeva	4	4
WC	(Russia) S Kuznetsova	6	6
3	(Russia) A Pavlyuchenkova	6	7^{7}
Q	(Spain) E Cabeza Candela	3	6^{4}
(Romania) M Niculescu	4	4
7	(Russia) E Vesnina	6	6

Quarterfinals
(Switzerland) R Oprandi	6	6
WC	(Russia) S Kuznetsova	2	2
3	(Russia) A Pavlyuchenkova	6	6^{3}	7^{7}
7	(Russia) E Vesnina	3	7^{7}	6^{3}

Semifinals
(Switzerland) R Oprandi	6	3	1
3	(Russia) A Pavlyuchenkova	0	6	6

=== Bottom half ===
First round
8/WC	(Germany) J Görges	6^{3}	2
LL	(Puerto Rico) M Puig	7^{7}	6
(Italy) F Schiavone	6	4	6
(Spain) L Domínguez Lino	2	6	3
(Belgium) Y Wickmayer	6	7
(Georgia (country)) A Tatishvili	1	5
(New Zealand) M Erakovic	3	0
4	(Spain) C Suárez Navarro	6	6
5	(Romania) S Cîrstea	6	2	6
(Spain) A Medina Garrigues	2	6	1
(Estonia) K Kanepi	6	6
(France) K Mladenovic	4	3
(United Kingdom) L Robson	2	5
(Japan) A Morita	6	7
(Poland) U Radwańska	2	6	6
2/WC	(Slovakia) D Cibulková	6	4	4

Second round
LL	(Puerto Rico) M Puig	6	6
(Italy) F Schiavone	3	2
(Belgium) Y Wickmayer	4	3
4	(Spain) C Suárez Navarro	6	6
5	(Romania) S Cîrstea	1	2
(Estonia) K Kanepi	6	6
(Japan) A Morita	6	6
(Poland) U Radwańska	2	3

Quarterfinals
LL	(Puerto Rico) M Puig	2	4
4	(Spain) C Suárez Navarro	6	6
(Estonia) K Kanepi	6	6
(Japan) A Morita	4	3

Semifinals
4	(Spain) C Suárez Navarro	6	6
(Estonia) K Kanepi	4	1

== Qualifying ==
=== Seeds ===
1. (Germany) Annika Beck (first round)
2. (Sweden) Johanna Larsson (first round)
3. (Ukraine) Lesia Tsurenko (second round)
4. (Spain) María Teresa Torró Flor (first round)
5. (United States) Melanie Oudin (first round)
6. (Ukraine) Elina Svitolina (second round)
7. (Kazakhstan) Yulia Putintseva (first round)
8. (Italy) Karin Knapp (first round)

=== Qualifiers ===
1. (France) Aravane Rezaï
2. (Spain) Estrella Cabeza Candela
3. (Israel) Shahar Pe'er
4. (Kazakhstan) Galina Voskoboeva

=== Lucky losers ===
1. (Puerto Rico) Monica Puig

=== Draw ===
==== First qualifier ====
First round
1	(Germany) Annika Beck	1	5
(United States) Vania King	6	7
(Italy) Nastassja Burnett	6	6
(Kazakhstan) Sesil Karatantcheva	2	3
(France) Aravane Rezaï	6	6^{8}	6
WC	(Portugal) Rita Vilaça	2	7^{10}	2
(Russia) Valeria Savinykh	3	6	6
5	(United States) Melanie Oudin	6	2	2

Second round
(United States) Vania King	6^{3}	7^{8}	6
(Italy) Nastassja Burnett	7^{7}	6^{6}	4
(France) Aravane Rezaï	6	6
(Russia) Valeria Savinykh	4	4

Qualifying competition
(United States) Vania King	3	2
(France) Aravane Rezaï	6	6

==== Second qualifier ====
First round
2	(Sweden) Johanna Larsson	4	3
(Spain) Estrella Cabeza Candela	6	6
(France) Virginie Razzano	5	5
(Brazil) Teliana Pereira	7	7
WC	(Portugal) Joana Valle Costa	1	1
(France) Stéphanie Foretz Gacon	6	6
(United Kingdom) Johanna Konta	4	6	7
7	(Kazakhstan) Yulia Putintseva	6	1	5

Second round
(Spain) Estrella Cabeza Candela	6	6
(Brazil) Teliana Pereira	3	4
(France) Stéphanie Foretz Gacon	6	3
(United Kingdom) Johanna Konta	4	0^{r}

Qualifying competition
(Spain) Estrella Cabeza Candela	6	6
(France) Stéphanie Foretz Gacon	4	0

==== Third qualifier ====
First round
3	(Ukraine) Lesia Tsurenko	6	6
WC	(Portugal) Sofia Araújo	1	2
(Colombia) Catalina Castaño	6	3	7^{8}
(Russia) Alla Kudryavtseva	3	6	6^{6}
(France) Caroline Garcia	5	6	1
(Australia) Anastasia Rodionova	7	2	6
(Israel) Shahar Pe'er	6	7
8	(Italy) Karin Knapp	3	5

Second round
3	(Ukraine) Lesia Tsurenko	3	7^{7}	5
(Colombia) Catalina Castaño	6	6^{5}	7
(Australia) Anastasia Rodionova	0^{r}
(Israel) Shahar Pe'er	4

Qualifying competition
(Colombia) Catalina Castaño	6^{1}	4
(Israel) Shahar Pe'er	7^{7}	6

==== Fourth qualifier ====
First round
4	(Spain) María Teresa Torró Flor	6	4	4
(Puerto Rico) Monica Puig	0	6	6
(Russia) Daria Gavrilova	3	6	0
(France) Claire Feuerstein	6	2	6
(Kazakhstan) Galina Voskoboeva	6	6
WC	(Portugal) Bárbara Luz	2	2
(Russia) Nina Bratchikova	2	4
6	(Ukraine) Elina Svitolina	6	6

Second round
(Puerto Rico) Monica Puig	6	6
(France) Claire Feuerstein	3	0
(Kazakhstan) Galina Voskoboeva	7^{10}	3	6
6	(Ukraine) Elina Svitolina	6^{8}	6	1

Qualifying competition
(Puerto Rico) Monica Puig	3	3
(Kazakhstan) Galina Voskoboeva	6	6
