= 2013 Portugal Open – Men's singles =

Tennis tournament

Men's singles
- 2013 Portugal Open

Final
- Champion: (Switzerland) Stanislas Wawrinka
- Runner-up: (Spain) David Ferrer
- Score: 6–1, 6–4

Events
Singles	men	women
Doubles	men	women
← 2012 ·	Portugal Open	· 2014 →

Juan Martín del Potro was the defending champion, but withdrew before the tournament, because of illness.
Stanislas Wawrinka defeated David Ferrer 6–1, 6–4 in the final to win the title.

== Seeds ==
The top four seeds receive a bye into the second round.

1. (Spain) David Ferrer (final)
2. (Switzerland) Stanislas Wawrinka (champion)
3. (Italy) Andreas Seppi (semifinals)
4. (Italy) Fabio Fognini (quarterfinals)
5. (France) Julien Benneteau (first round)
6. (France) Benoît Paire (second round)
7. (Argentina) Horacio Zeballos (first round)
8. (Spain) Tommy Robredo (quarterfinals)

== Draw ==
=== Key ===
- Q = Qualifier
- WC = Wild card
- LL = Lucky loser
- Alt = Alternate
- SE = Special exempt
- PR = Protected ranking
- ITF = ITF entry
- JE = Junior exempt
- w/o = Walkover
- r = Retired
- d = Defaulted
- SR = Special ranking

=== Finals ===
Semifinals
1/WC	(Spain) David Ferrer	6	6
3	(Italy) Andreas Seppi	1	4
Q	(Spain) Pablo Carreño Busta	3	6	1
2	(Switzerland) Stanislas Wawrinka	6	3	6

Final
1/WC	(Spain) David Ferrer	1	4
2	(Switzerland) Stanislas Wawrinka	6	6

=== Top half ===
First round
(Luxembourg) G Müller	1	0^{r}
(France) É Roger-Vasselin	6	0
(Romania) V Hănescu	6	6
Q	(Portugal) R Machado	4	4
(Netherlands) I Sijsling	6^{5}	3
6	(France) B Paire	7^{7}	6
(Colombia) A Falla	7	6
(Russia) A Kuznetsov	5	4
(Spain) P Andújar	6	2	3
Q	(Netherlands) R Haase	4	6	6
(Spain) D Gimeno Traver	6	5	3
8	(Spain) T Robredo	2	7	6

Second round
1/WC	(Spain) D Ferrer	6	4	6
(France) É Roger-Vasselin	4	6	3
(Romania) V Hănescu	7^{7}	6
6	(France) B Paire	6^{2}	4
3	(Italy) A Seppi	6	6
(Colombia) A Falla	4	0
Q	(Netherlands) R Haase	4	4
8	(Spain) T Robredo	6	6

Quarterfinals
1/WC	(Spain) D Ferrer	6	7^{7}
(Romania) V Hănescu	4	6^{2}
3	(Italy) A Seppi	6	6
8	(Spain) T Robredo	4	3

Semifinals
1/WC	(Spain) D Ferrer	6	6
3	(Italy) A Seppi	1	4

=== Bottom half ===
First round
5	(France) J Benneteau	3	4
Q	(Spain) P Carreño Busta	6	6
(Belgium) D Goffin	7^{7}	4	6
WC	(Portugal) P Sousa	6^{1}	6	4
(Italy) P Lorenzi	6	4	6
Q	(Belgium) N Desein	3	6	2
7	(Argentina) H Zeballos	3	4
WC	(Portugal) G Elias	6	6
(Uzbekistan) D Istomin	2	7^{8}	6
(Russia) E Donskoy	6	6^{6}	4
(Spain) A Ramos	7^{7}	2	6
(Argentina) C Berlocq	6^{4}	6	3

Second round
Q	(Spain) P Carreño Busta	1	6	6
(Belgium) D Goffin	6	2	2
(Italy) P Lorenzi	6^{5}	7	4
4	(Italy) F Fognini	7^{7}	5	6
WC	(Portugal) G Elias	3	6	6
(Uzbekistan) D Istomin	6	1	4
(Spain) A Ramos	6	3	4
2	(Switzerland) S Wawrinka	1	6	6

Quarterfinals
Q	(Spain) P Carreño Busta	3	6	6
4	(Italy) F Fognini	6	4	4
WC	(Portugal) G Elias	4	4
2	(Switzerland) S Wawrinka	6	6

Semifinals
Q	(Spain) P Carreño Busta	3	6	1
2	(Switzerland) S Wawrinka	6	3	6

== Qualifying ==
=== Seeds ===
1. (Netherlands) Robin Haase (qualified)
2. (Netherlands) Thiemo de Bakker (qualifying competition)
3. (Spain) Javier Martí (qualifying competition)
4. (Belgium) Niels Desein (qualified)
5. (Russia) Igor Andreev (first round)
6. (Spain) Pablo Carreño (qualified)
7. (Switzerland) Henri Laaksonen (qualifying competition)
8. (Portugal) Frederico Gil (second round)

=== Qualifiers ===
1. (Netherlands) Robin Haase
2. (Portugal) Rui Machado
3. (Spain) Pablo Carreño
4. (Belgium) Niels Desein

=== Draw ===
==== First qualifier ====
First round
1	(Netherlands) Robin Haase	6	6
WC	(Portugal) João Barra	0	2
WC	(Portugal) Artur Completo	6	4	2
(Australia) John Peers	3	6	6
(Portugal) André Gaspar Murta	6	6
WC	(Portugal) Rodolfo Pereira	1	1
(United Kingdom) Dominic Inglot	4	0
7	(Switzerland) Henri Laaksonen	6	6

Second round
1	(Netherlands) Robin Haase	3	6	6
(Australia) John Peers	6	3	2
(Portugal) André Gaspar Murta	6	3	6^{1}
7	(Switzerland) Henri Laaksonen	2	6	7^{7}

Qualifying competition
1	(Netherlands) Robin Haase	6	6
7	(Switzerland) Henri Laaksonen	3	2

==== Second qualifier ====
First round
2	(Netherlands) Thiemo de Bakker	6	6
(Greece) Theodoros Angelinos	3	2
(Portugal) Leonardo Tavares	4	6	3
(Russia) Mikhail Elgin	6	1	6
(Portugal) Frederico Ferreira Silva	6^{4}	7^{7}	5
(Latvia) Andis Juška	7	6^{3}	7
(Portugal) Rui Machado	7^{7}	6
5	(Russia) Igor Andreev	6^{2}	1

Second round
2	(Netherlands) Thiemo de Bakker	6	6
(Russia) Mikhail Elgin	4	1
(Latvia) Andis Juška	1	3
(Portugal) Rui Machado	6	6

Qualifying competition
2	(Netherlands) Thiemo de Bakker	5	2
(Portugal) Rui Machado	7	6

==== Third qualifier ====
First round
3	(Spain) Javier Martí	6	6
(Portugal) Vasco Mensurado	2	4
(Spain) David Estruch	4	6	5
(Russia) Alexander Lobkov	6	3	7
WC	(Portugal) Felipe Cunha e Silva	6	6
(Portugal) Henrique Sousa	2	4
(Portugal) José-Ricardo Nunes	3	2
6	(Spain) Pablo Carreño	6	6

Second round
3	(Spain) Javier Martí	7^{7}	6
(Russia) Alexander Lobkov	6^{5}	1
WC	(Portugal) Felipe Cunha e Silva	1	0
6	(Spain) Pablo Carreño	6	6

Qualifying competition
3	(Spain) Javier Martí	6	4	5
6	(Spain) Pablo Carreño	2	6	7

==== Fourth qualifier ====
First round
4	(Belgium) Niels Desein	6	6
(Spain) Rafael Mazón-Hernández	0	1
(Portugal) Gonçalo Falcão	4	5
(Spain) Pere Riba	6	7
(Portugal) João Domingues	6	7
(Portugal) Gonçalo Loureiro	2	5
(Portugal) Gonçalo Pereira	4	2
8	(Portugal) Frederico Gil	6	6

Second round
4	(Belgium) Niels Desein	2	7^{7}	6
(Spain) Pere Riba	6	6^{5}	3
(Portugal) João Domingues	2	6	6
8	(Portugal) Frederico Gil	6	3	1

Qualifying competition
4	(Belgium) Niels Desein	6	7
(Portugal) João Domingues	0	5
