= 2013 Portugal Open =

Tennis tournament

- Date: 29 April – 5 May
- Edition: 24th (ATP) / 17th (WTA)
- Draw: 28S / 16D; 32S / 16D
- Prize money: €467,800 $235,000
- Surface: Clay / outdoor
- Location: Oeiras, Portugal
- Venue: Estádio Nacional

Champions

Men's singles
- (Switzerland) Stanislas Wawrinka

Women's singles
- (Russia) Anastasia Pavlyuchenkova

Men's doubles
- (Mexico) Santago González / (United States) Scott Lipsky

Women's doubles
- (Chinese Taipei) Chan Hao-ching / (France) Kristina Mladenovic
- Portugal Open

The 2013 Portugal Open was a tennis tournament played on outdoor clay courts. It was the 24th edition of the Portugal Open for the men and the 17th for the women, and was part of the ATP World Tour 250 series of the 2013 ATP World Tour, and of the International-level tournaments of the 2013 WTA Tour. Both the men's and the women's events took place at the Estádio Nacional in Oeiras, Portugal, from April 29 through May 5, 2013. Formerly named Estoril Open, the organization of the tournament changed its name to "Portugal Open" in order to recognize Portugal's success in organizing international events.

== ATP singles main draw entrants ==
=== Seeds ===
Country	Player	Rank^{1}	Seed
ESP	David Ferrer	4	1
SUI	Stanislas Wawrinka	17	2
ITA	Andreas Seppi	18	3
ITA	Fabio Fognini	24	4
FRA	Julien Benneteau	32	5
FRA	Benoît Paire	33	6
ARG	Horacio Zeballos	40	7
ESP	Tommy Robredo	43	8

- Rankings are as of April 22, 2013.

=== Other entrants ===
The following players received wildcards into the singles main draw:

- (Portugal) Gastão Elias
- (Spain) David Ferrer
- (Portugal) Pedro Sousa

The following players received entry from the qualifying draw:

- (Spain) Pablo Carreño
- (Belgium) Niels Desein
- (Netherlands) Robin Haase
- (Portugal) Rui Machado

=== Withdrawals ===
Before the tournament

- (South Africa) Kevin Anderson
- (Argentina) Juan Martín del Potro (illness)
- (Argentina) Leonardo Mayer
- (Argentina) Juan Mónaco

=== Retirements ===
- (Luxembourg) Gilles Müller (left shoulder injury)

== ATP doubles main draw entrants ==
=== Seeds ===
Country	Player	Country	Player	Rank^{1}	Seed
PAK	Aisam-ul-Haq Qureshi	NED	Jean-Julien Rojer	15	1
ESP	David Marrero	BRA	Marcelo Melo	44	2
MEX	Santiago González	USA	Scott Lipsky	62	3
ITA	Daniele Bracciali	ITA	Fabio Fognini	64	4

- Rankings are as of April 22, 2013.

=== Other entrants ===
The following pairs received wildcards into the doubles main draw:

- (Portugal) Frederico Gil / (Portugal) Pedro Sousa
- (Portugal) Frederico Ferreira Silva / (Portugal) Leonardo Tavares

The following pair received entry as alternates:

- (Russia) Evgeny Donskoy / (Russia) Andrey Kuznetsov

=== Withdrawals ===
Before the tournament

- (Luxembourg) Gilles Müller (left shoulder injury)

== WTA singles main draw entrants ==
=== Seeds ===
Country	Player	Rank^{1}	Seed
FRA	Marion Bartoli	14	1
SVK	Dominika Cibulková	15	2
RUS	Anastasia Pavlyuchenkova	19	3
ESP	Carla Suárez Navarro	23	4
ROU	Sorana Cîrstea	26	5
USA	Varvara Lepchenko	27	6
RUS	Elena Vesnina	29	7
GER	Julia Görges	30	8

- Rankings are as of April 22, 2013.

=== Other entrants ===
The following players received wildcards into the singles main draw:

- (Slovakia) Dominika Cibulková
- (Germany) Julia Görges
- (Portugal) Maria João Koehler
- (Russia) Svetlana Kuznetsova

The following players received entry from the qualifying draw:

- (Spain) Estrella Cabeza Candela
- (Israel) Shahar Pe'er
- (France) Aravane Rezaï
- (Kazakhstan) Galina Voskoboeva

The following player received entry as a lucky loser:

- (Puerto Rico) Monica Puig

=== Withdrawals ===
Before the tournament

- (Romania) Irina-Camelia Begu (right shoulder injury)
- (France) Alizé Cornet (shoulder injury)
- (Kazakhstan) Yaroslava Shvedova
- (Italy) Roberta Vinci (shoulder injury)
- (United Kingdom) Heather Watson (mononucleosis)

== WTA doubles main draw entrants ==
=== Seeds ===
Country	Player	Country	Player	Rank^{1}	Seed
USA	Raquel Kops-Jones	USA	Abigail Spears	29	1
TPE	Chan Hao-ching	FRA	Kristina Mladenovic	73	2
RSA	Natalie Grandin	CZE	Vladimíra Uhlířová	73	3
CRO	Darija Jurak	HUN	Katalin Marosi	79	4

- Rankings are as of April 22, 2013.

=== Other entrants ===
The following pairs received wildcards into the doubles main draw:

- (Portugal) Sofia Araújo / (Portugal) Joana Valle Costa
- (Russia) Daria Gavrilova / (Portugal) Bárbara Luz

== Finals ==
=== Men's singles ===
- (Switzerland) Stanislas Wawrinka defeated (Spain) David Ferrer 6–1, 6–4

=== Women's singles ===
- (Russia) Anastasia Pavlyuchenkova defeated (Spain) Carla Suárez Navarro 7–5, 6–2

=== Men's doubles ===
- (Mexico) Santiago González / (United States) Scott Lipsky defeated (Pakistan) Aisam-ul-Haq Qureshi / (Netherlands) Jean-Julien Rojer, 6–3, 4–6, [10–7]

=== Women's doubles ===
- (Chinese Taipei) Chan Hao-ching / (France) Kristina Mladenovic defeated (Croatia) Darija Jurak / (Hungary) Katalin Marosi, 7–6^{(7–3)}, 6–2
