= Strada statale 106 Jonica =

State highway in Italy

State Highway 106
- Strada statale 106
- Jonica

Route information
- Part of E90
- Maintained by ANAS
- Length: 491 km (305 mi)
- Existed: 1928–present

Major junctions
- From: Reggio Calabria
- To: Port of Taranto

Location
- Country: Italy
- Regions: Apulia, Basilicata, Calabria

Highway system
- Roads in Italy; Autostrade; State; Regional; Provincial; Municipal
← SS 101	→ SS 106 radd

Strada statale 106 Jonica (SS 106) is an Italian state highway 491 kilometres (305 mi) long in Italy located in the regions of Apulia, Basilicata and Calabria which extends from Reggio Calabria to Taranto, covering the whole coast Jonica in Calabria, Basilicata and parts of Apulia. It constitutes a traffic route of national importance and is included in European route E90.

== Route ==
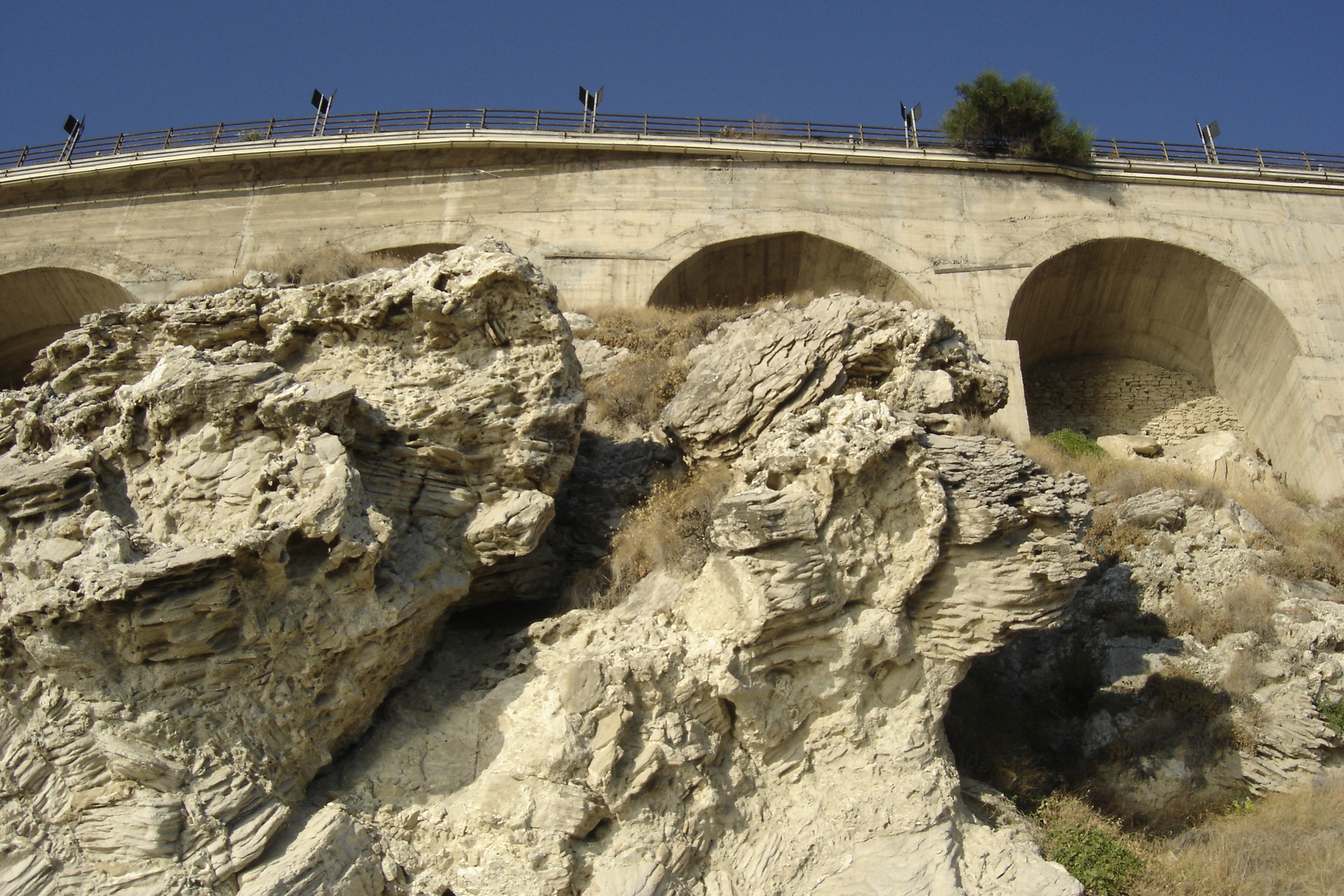
Strada statale 106 Jonica in Motta San Giovanni

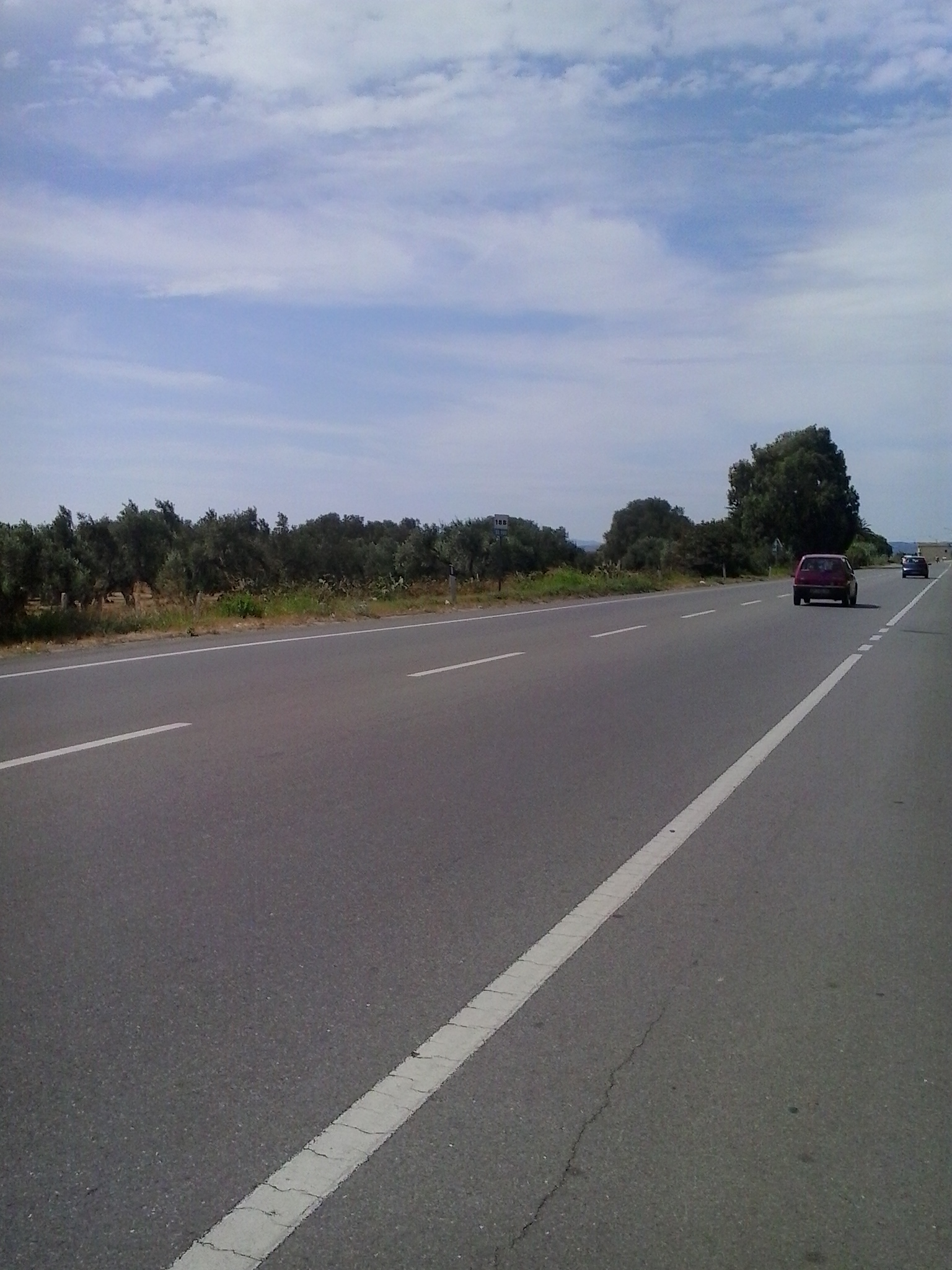
Strada statale 106 Jonica in Borgia

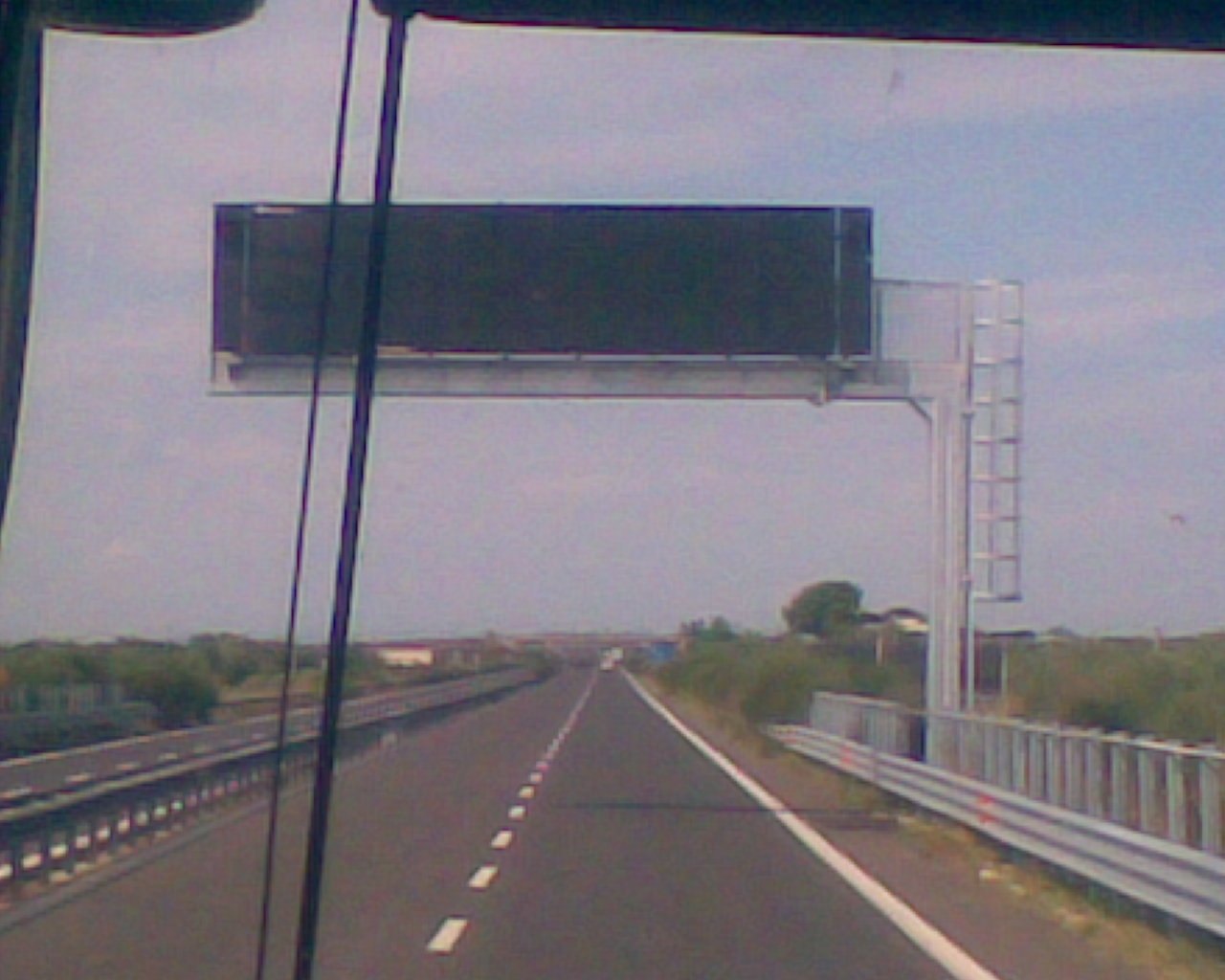
Strada statale 106 Jonica in Palagiano

=== From Sibari to Montegiordano Marina ===
Jonica
Exit	↓km↓	Province	European route
radd Jonica	369.0 km (229.3 mi)	CS	E90
Sibari ex SS 106	369.2 km (229.4 mi)	CS	E90
Villapiana Scalo dell'Appennino meridionale	372.5 km (231.5 mi)	CS	E90
Villapiana Lido per Villapiana	373.9 km (232.3 mi)	CS	E90
Villapiana Lido per Villapiana	376.7 km (234.1 mi)	CS	E90
Trebisacce sud	380.0 km (236.1 mi)	CS	E90
Trebisacce centro	383.1 km (238.0 mi)	CS	E90
Trebisacce nord	385.5 km (239.5 mi)	CS	E90
Marina di Albidona	388.7 km (241.5 mi)	CS	E90
Tarianni to Marina di Amendolara	391.3 km (243.1 mi)	CS	E90
Marina di Amendolara per Amendolara	392.7 km (244.0 mi)	CS	E90
della Valle del Ferro	395.6 km (245.8 mi)	CS	E90
Borgata Marina	396.4 km (246.3 mi)	CS	E90
Marina di Roseto Capo Spulico	395.6 km (245.8 mi)	CS	E90
to Roseto Capo Spulico; Roseto Capo Spulico Castle	398.3 km (247.5 mi)	CS	E90
Begin main extra-urban road	400.1 km (248.6 mi)	CS	E90
Montegiordano Marina	403.4 km (250.7 mi)	CS	E90
Montegiordano variant	403.4 km (250.7 mi)	CS	E90

=== From Montegiordano Marina to Marina di Nova Siri ===
Jonica
Exit	↓km↓	Province	European route
Variante di Montegiordano	406.74 km (252.74 mi)	CS	E90
Rocca Imperiale Marina to Rocca Imperiale, Canna, Nocara	411.4 km (255.6 mi)	CS	E90
Rocca Imperiale Marina to Rocca Imperiale, Canna, Nocara	412.5 km (256.3 mi)	CS	E90
Nova Siri variant	414.1 km (257.3 mi)	CS	E90
Nova Siri Sud; Marina di Nova Siri and Jonica	414.1 km (257.3 mi)	CS	E90

=== From Marina di Nova Siri to Taranto ===
Jonica
Exit	↓km↓	Province	European route
Nova Siri Scalo SS per Nova Siri Marina di Nova Siri	416.9 km (259.0 mi)	MT	E90
Nova Siri former variant	418.6 km (260.1 mi)	MT	E90
Rotondella; Rotondella Lido and Nova Siri Lido	418.8 km (260.2 mi)	MT	E90
Centro ricerche E.N.E.A.	419.4 km (260.6 mi)	MT	E90
della Valle del Sinni; Artisan area	420.5 km (261.3 mi)	MT	E90
Policoro sud Lido di Policoro	424.9 km (264.0 mi)	MT	E90
Policoro	426.2 km (264.8 mi)	MT	E90
di Fondo Valle d'Agri; Artisan area	429.0 km (266.6 mi)	MT	E90
Scanzano Jonico centro	430.7 km (267.6 mi)	MT	E90
Scanzano Jonico nord	432.3 km (268.6 mi)	MT	E90
Terzo Cavone; SP per Montalbano Jonico	435.7 km (270.7 mi)	MT	E90
Marconia; Pisticci; Marina di Pisticci	439.3 km (273.0 mi)	MT	E90
Borgo Casinello	441.1 km (274.1 mi)	MT	E90
San Teodoro; Marina di Pisticci	442.2 km (274.8 mi)	MT	E90
Marconia; Pisticci	445.4 km (276.8 mi)	MT	E90
Metaponto Basentana; Lido di Metaponto	447.1 km (277.8 mi)	MT	E90
Pantanello	448.5 km (278.7 mi)	MT	E90
ex della Valle del Bradano	450.1 km (279.7 mi)	MT	E90
Tavole Palatine (solo uscita in direzione Taranto)	452.0 km (280.9 mi)	MT	E90
Tavole Palatine	452.5 km (281.2 mi)	MT	E90
Contrada Pantano; Marina di Ginosa	454.6 km (282.5 mi)	TA	E90
ex di Ginosa; Marina di Ginosa	457.9 km (284.5 mi)	TA	E90
Riva dei Tessali	461.8 km (286.9 mi)	TA	E90
Castellaneta Marina to Castellaneta	464.1 km (288.4 mi)	TA	E90
Castellaneta Marina to Castellaneta	466.5 km (289.9 mi)	TA	E90
Pino di Lenne per Palagiano	473.9 km (294.5 mi)	TA	E90
Chiatona	476.2 km (295.9 mi)	TA	E90
Jonica; Adriatica	476.6 km (296.1 mi)	TA	E90
Chiatona per Massafra	477.5 km (296.7 mi)	TA	E90
Lido Azzurro ovest	483.0 km (300.1 mi)	TA	E90
Lido Azzurro est per SS 7	484.8 km (301.2 mi)	TA	E90
Zona industriale di Taranto	486.0 km (302.0 mi)	TA	E90
Port of Taranto	488.0 km (303.2 mi)	TA	E90
Taranto petrochemical hub	489.2 km (304.0 mi)	TA	E90
del Porto di Taranto	490.8 km (305.0 mi)	TA	E90
Taranto	491.0 km (305.1 mi)	TA	E90

== See also ==
- State highways (Italy)
- Roads in Italy
- Transport in Italy

=== Other Italian roads ===
- Autostrade of Italy
- Regional road (Italy)
- Provincial road (Italy)
- Municipal road (Italy)
