= List of highways numbered 106 =

Route 106 or Highway 106 can refer to multiple roads:

== Canada ==
- New Brunswick Route 106
- Nova Scotia Highway 106
- Prince Edward Island Route 106
- Saskatchewan Highway 106

== China ==
- China National Highway 106

== Costa Rica ==
- National Route 106

== India ==
- National Highway 106 (India)

== Italy ==
- State road 106

== Japan ==
- National Route 106

== Nigeria ==
- F106 highway (Nigeria)

== Philippines ==
- N106 highway (Philippines)

== United Kingdom ==
- A106 road
- B106 road

== United States ==
- U.S. Route 106 (former)
- Alabama State Route 106
  - County Route 106 (Lee County, Alabama)
- Arkansas Highway 106
- California State Route 106 (former)
- Connecticut Route 106
- County Road 106 (Duval County, Florida)
  - County Road 106B (Duval County, Florida)
- Georgia State Route 106
- Illinois Route 106
- Indiana State Road 106
- K-106 (Kansas highway)
- Kentucky Route 106
- Louisiana Highway 106
- Maine State Route 106
- Maryland Route 106 (former)
- Massachusetts Route 106
- M-106 (Michigan highway)
- Minnesota State Highway 106
- Missouri Route 106
- Nebraska Highway 106 (former)
- New Hampshire Route 106
- County Route 106 (Bergen County, New Jersey)
- New Mexico State Road 106
- New York State Route 106
  - County Route 106 (Albany County, New York)
  - County Route 106 (Cortland County, New York)
    - County Route 106A (Cortland County, New York)
  - County Route 106 (Erie County, New York)
  - County Route 106 (Nassau County, New York)
  - County Route 106 (Orange County, New York)
  - County Route 106 (Orleans County, New York)
  - County Route 106 (Rockland County, New York)
  - County Route 106 (Schenectady County, New York)
  - County Route 106 (Suffolk County, New York)
  - County Route 106 (Westchester County, New York)
- North Carolina Highway 106
- Ohio State Route 106 (former)
- Oklahoma State Highway 106
- Pennsylvania Route 106
- South Dakota Highway 106
- Tennessee State Route 106
- Texas State Highway 106 (former)
  - Texas State Highway Loop 106
  - Texas State Highway Spur 106 (former)
  - Farm to Market Road 106
- Utah State Route 106
- Vermont Route 106
- Virginia State Route 106
  - Virginia State Route 106 (1923-1928) (former)
  - Virginia State Route 106 (1928-1933) (former)
  - Virginia State Route 106 (1933-1940) (former)
- Washington State Route 106
- West Virginia Route 106
- Wisconsin Highway 106

Territories

- Puerto Rico Highway 106

== See also ==
- A106
- B106 road
- Pahang State Route C106
- D106 road
- N106 (Bangladesh)
- List of national roads in Latvia § P106
- R106 road (Ireland)

Preceded by 105	Lists of highways 106	Succeeded by 107
