= List of highways numbered 105 =

Route 105 or Highway 105 may refer to:

== Argentina ==
- National Route 105
- La Pampa Provincial Route 105

== Canada ==
- New Brunswick Route 105
- Nova Scotia Highway 105 (Trans-Canada Highway)
- Ontario Highway 105
- Prince Edward Island Route 105
- Quebec Route 105

== China ==
- China National Highway 105
- S105 Nansha Port Expressway (Guangdong)

== Costa Rica ==
- National Route 105

== India ==
- National Highway 105 (India)

== Japan ==
- Route 105 (Japan)

== Nigeria ==
- F105 highway (Nigeria)

== Philippines ==
- N105 highway (Philippines)

== South Korea ==
- Namhae Expressway Branch 3

== United Kingdom ==
- A105 road
- B105 road

== United States ==
- Interstate 105 (multiple highways)
- Alabama State Route 105
- Arkansas Highway 105
- Colorado State Highway 105
- Florida State Road 105
- Georgia State Route 105
  - Georgia State Route 105 (1932–1937) (former)
- Illinois Route 105
- Indiana State Road 105
- Iowa Highway 105 (former)
  - County Road 105 (Mitchell County, Iowa)
  - County Road 105 (Worth County, Iowa)
- K-105 (Kansas highway)
- Kentucky Route 105
- Louisiana Highway 105
  - Louisiana State Route 105 (former)
- Maine State Route 105
- Maryland Route 105 (former)
- Massachusetts Route 105
- M-105 (Michigan highway) (former)
- Minnesota State Highway 105
- Missouri Route 105
- Nebraska Highway 105
- County Route 105 (Bergen County, New Jersey)
  - County Route 105 (Ocean County, New Jersey)
- New Mexico State Road 105
- New York State Route 105
  - County Route 105 (Dutchess County, New York)
  - County Route 105 (Erie County, New York)
  - County Route 105 (Montgomery County, New York)
  - County Route 105 (Nassau County, New York)
  - County Route 105 (Niagara County, New York)
  - County Route 105 (Onondaga County, New York)
  - County Route 105 (Orange County, New York)
  - County Route 105 (Seneca County, New York)
  - County Route 105 (Steuben County, New York)
  - County Route 105 (Suffolk County, New York)
  - County Route 105 (Sullivan County, New York)
    - County Route 105A (Sullivan County, New York)
  - County Route 105 (Tompkins County, New York)
- North Carolina Highway 105
- Ohio State Route 105
- Oklahoma State Highway 105
- Pennsylvania Route 105 (former)
- South Carolina Highway 105
- South Dakota Highway 105 (former)
- Tennessee State Route 105
- Texas State Highway 105
  - Texas State Highway Loop 105
  - Texas State Highway Spur 105 (former)
  - Farm to Market Road 105
- Utah State Route 105
- Vermont Route 105
  - Vermont Route 105A
- Virginia State Route 105
- Washington State Route 105
- West Virginia Route 105
- Wisconsin Highway 105

Territories

- Puerto Rico Highway 105

== See also ==
- A105
- B105 road
- D105 road
- P105
- R105 road (Ireland)

Preceded by 104	Lists of highways 105	Succeeded by 106
