= 2013 Giro d'Italia, Stage 1 to Stage 11 =

Cycling race stages

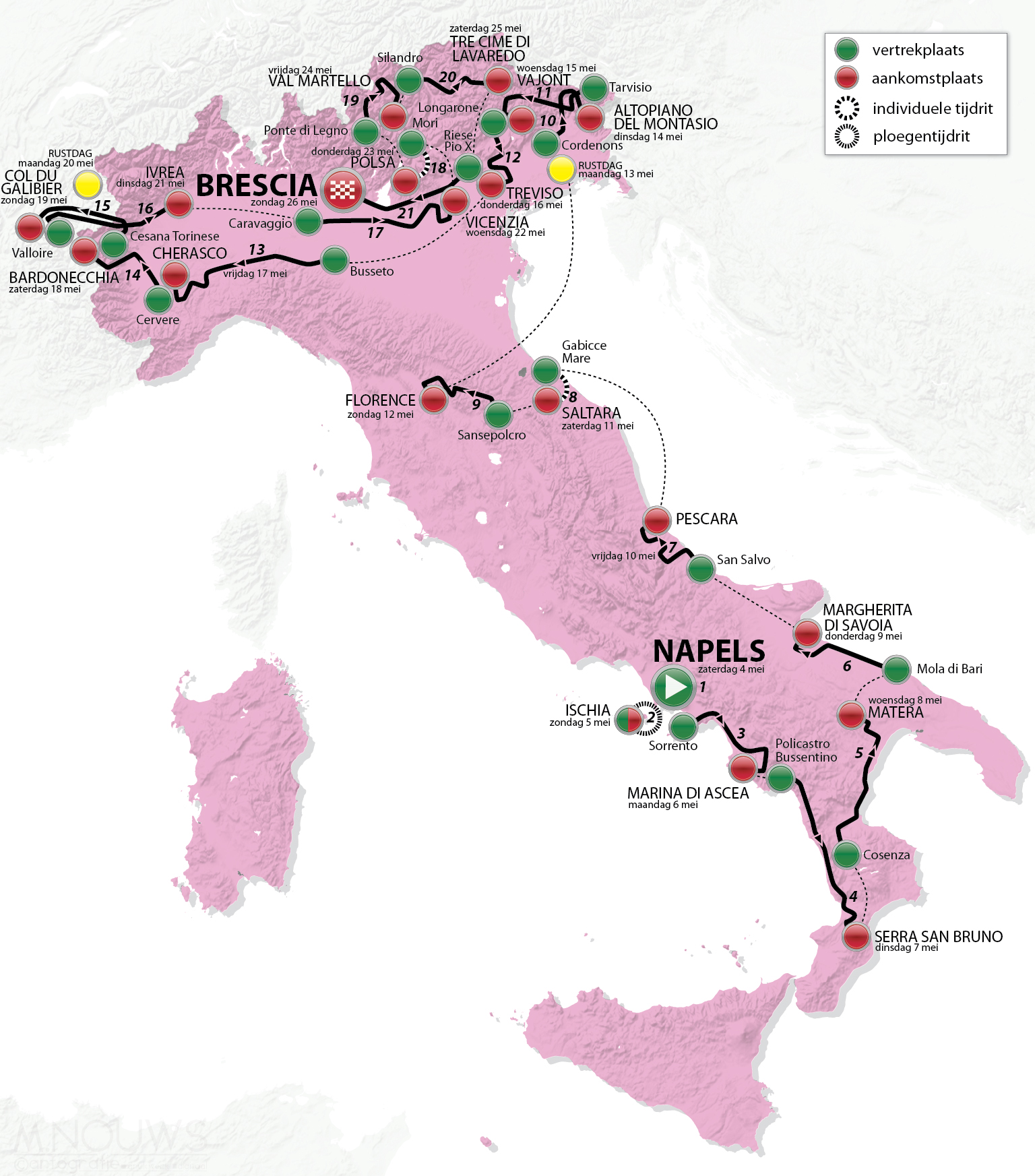
Overview of the stages; black lines represent distances covered in the individual stages, while black dotted lines are the distances covered in transfers between the stages.

The 2013 Giro d'Italia began on 4 May, and stage 11 occurred on 15 May. The 2013 edition began with a road stage, for the first time since 2003, around Naples before a team time trial took place the following day on the island of Ischia. The rest of the opening half of the race – remaining within Italy for the duration – consisted of medium-mountain stages, save for two categorised flat stages and the first of two individual time trials during the event; the 54.8 km (34.1 mi)-long eighth stage between Gabicce Mare and Saltara, where each remaining member of the starting peloton of 207 riders competed against the clock.

Mark Cavendish became the first race leader, as he won the opening stage in Naples; the first of two stage wins that Cavendish achieved during the opening half of the race, along with the sixth stage. As a result, Cavendish was the only rider to win multiple stages in the opening half of the race. Cavendish lost the race lead the following day, as his Omega Pharma–Quick-Step team failed to a sufficient time for him to remain in the jersey. Team Sky won the stage, which put Salvatore Puccio into the maglia rosa after he had placed highest during the opening stage, out of the five remaining members of the Team Sky train at the finish. Luca Paolini soloed into the leader's jersey after the third stage, attacking with 7 km (4.3 mi) remaining and held clear of the field to win by sixteen seconds. He held the leader's jersey for four days, before losing it on the seventh stage, held in heavy rain.

On that stage, Adam Hansen – a rider who had completed all three Grand Tours in 2012 – took the honours by over a minute from a stage-long breakaway, while Beñat Intxausti was able to take the leader's jersey after finishing in the group of the overall favourites for the race. Intxausti's weakness in the time trial discipline saw him surrender the lead the following day, losing three and a half minutes to the stage winner, team-mate Alex Dowsett. Vincenzo Nibali – a previous Grand Tour winner at the 2010 Vuelta a España – assumed the race lead, and held the lead to the end of the eleventh stage, which marked the halfway point of the race. Nibali had ended the time trial 29 seconds clear of closest challenger Cadel Evans, but he gained twelve bonus seconds on the tenth stage, the race's first summit finish, to extend his advantage to 41 seconds with the more mountainous second half of the Giro still to come.

Legend (Note: Jerseys appearing in the table on the left of the page indicate those worn by the cyclist during the particular stage, while those appearing in the table on the right of the page indicate those awarded to the cyclist after the stage.)
A pink jersey	Denotes the leader of the General classification	A blue jersey	Denotes the leader of the Mountains classification
A red jersey	Denotes the leader of the Points classification	A white jersey	Denotes the leader of the Young rider classification
	s.t. indicates that the rider crossed the finish line in the same group as the one receiving the time above him, and was therefore credited with the same finishing time.		

== Stage 1 ==
4 May 2013 — Naples to Naples, 130 km (80.8 mi)

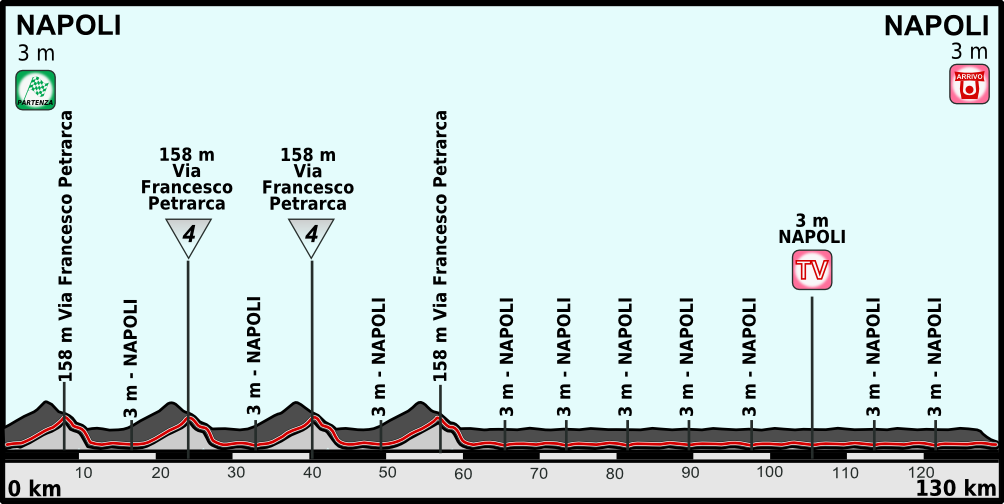

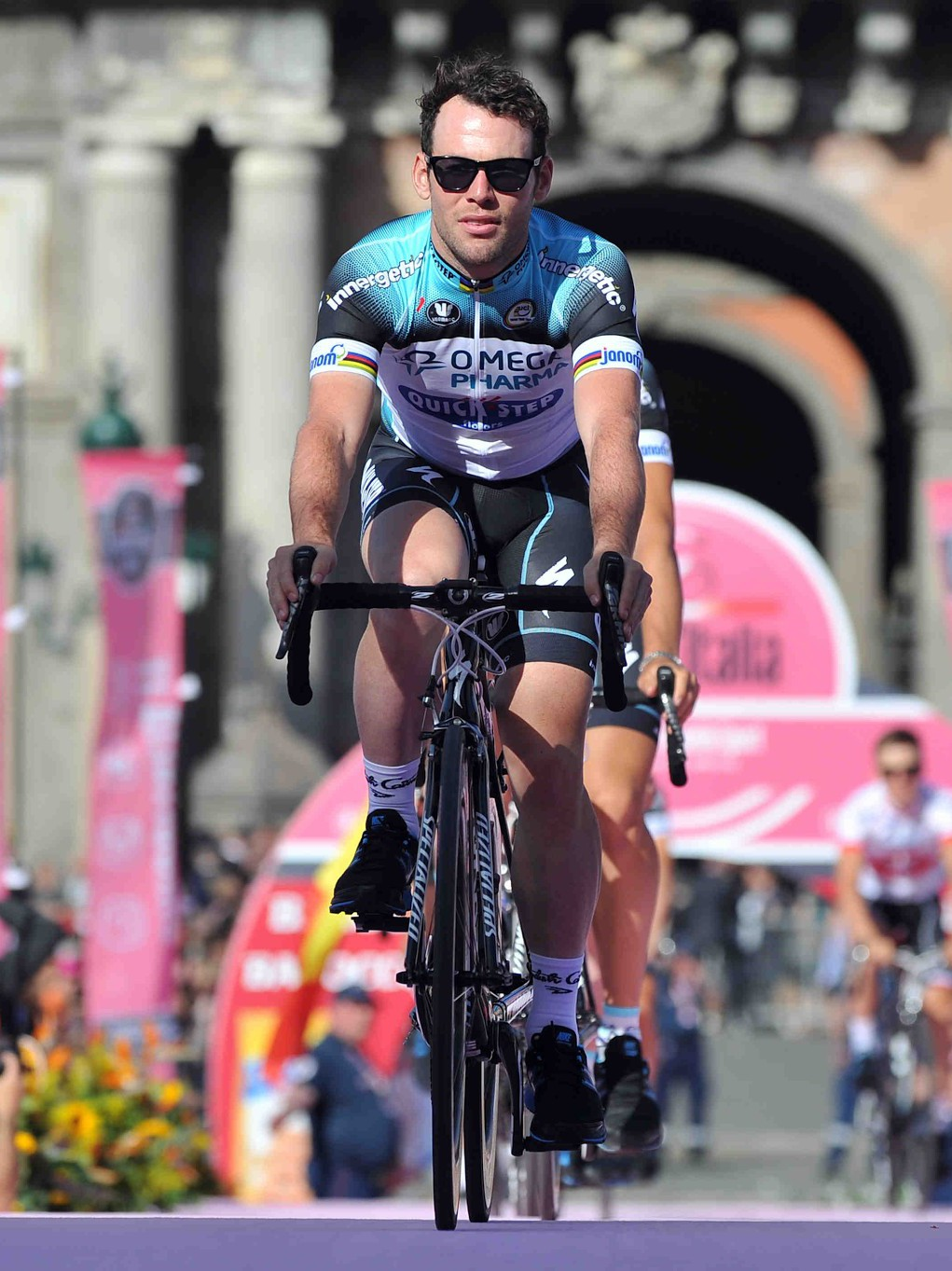
Omega Pharma–Quick-Step rider Mark Cavendish pictured before the stage. Cavendish out-sprinted a select group of riders to achieve his eleventh individual stage win at the Giro d'Italia, and his 37th at a Grand Tour.

For the first time since the 2003 edition of the race, the Giro d'Italia began with a mass-start stage rather than a time trial test against the clock. Naples was announced as the starting location for the race in June 2012, with the 2013 race marking the 50th anniversary of the race's only other start in Naples; on that occasion, Vittorio Adorni soloed to victory in Potenza. The opening stage of the 2013 Giro was a circuit race in and around Naples, with two different circuits being utilised. Four laps of a 16.3 km (10.1 mi)-long circuit were completed first, with two ascents of a fourth-category climb providing any potential breakaways with the opportunity of claiming the mountains jersey on the opening day. From there, a shorter circuit of 8.1 km (5.0 mi) in length was completed eight times, with the finish of the stage at the Lungomare Caracciolo. With no major tests on the stage, it was widely expected to end in a sprint finish.

Almost immediately after the race began, the breakaway was formed, with seven riders attempting to work together in order to create a sizable advantage over the field, but could not muster an advantage of much over two minutes. The Movistar Team's Giovanni Visconti and Cameron Wurf of Cannondale each led the breakaway over the summit of the climb, with Guillaume Bonnafond (Ag2r–La Mondiale) also achieving three points through minor placings on both ascents. This meant that the first maglia azzurra would be settled in the final sprint. Around halfway into the stage, Wurf moved off the front on his own, and remained clear of the field until around 19 km (11.8 mi), where the Omega Pharma–Quick-Step-led peloton moved past him.

Several late crashes split the field into many groups, the last of which came inside the final 3 km (1.9 mi), ensuring that the majority of the field would receive the same time as the stage winner. For the final sprint, it came down to a select group of sprinters; Orica–GreenEDGE sat on the front with the lead-out for Matthew Goss, but Elia Viviani (Cannondale) and Omega Pharma–Quick-Step's Mark Cavendish moved ahead, with Cavendish ultimately taking the victory on the line by almost a bike length. With his 37th Grand Tour stage win, moving him into a tie for eighth place on the all-time list with Rik Van Looy, Cavendish picked up the pink and red jerseys on the podium as leader of the general and points classifications. Although disappointed with losing the sprint, Viviani became the first white jersey wearer as young rider leader, and Visconti placed highest in the sprint to take the mountains lead.

Stage 1 result

	Rider	Team	Time
1	Mark Cavendish (GBR)	Omega Pharma–Quick-Step	2h 58' 38"
2	Elia Viviani (ITA)	Cannondale	s.t.
3	Nacer Bouhanni (FRA)	FDJ	s.t.
4	Giacomo Nizzolo (ITA)	RadioShack–Leopard	s.t.
5	Matthew Goss (AUS)	Orica–GreenEDGE	s.t.
6	Francisco Ventoso (ESP)	Movistar Team	s.t.
7	Adam Blythe (GBR)	BMC Racing Team	s.t.
8	Leigh Howard (AUS)	Orica–GreenEDGE	s.t.
9	Danilo Hondo (GER)	RadioShack–Leopard	s.t.
10	Brett Lancaster (AUS)	Orica–GreenEDGE	s.t.

General classification after stage 1

	Rider	Team	Time
1	Mark Cavendish (GBR)	Omega Pharma–Quick-Step	2h 58' 18"
2	Elia Viviani (ITA)	Cannondale	+ 8"
3	Nacer Bouhanni (FRA)	FDJ	+ 12"
4	Danilo Hondo (GER)	RadioShack–Leopard	+ 16"
5	Marco Marcato (ITA)	Vacansoleil–DCM	+ 18"
6	Giacomo Nizzolo (ITA)	RadioShack–Leopard	+ 20"
7	Matthew Goss (AUS)	Orica–GreenEDGE	+ 20"
8	Francisco Ventoso (ESP)	Movistar Team	+ 20"
9	Adam Blythe (GBR)	BMC Racing Team	+ 20"
10	Leigh Howard (AUS)	Orica–GreenEDGE	+ 20"

== Stage 2 ==
5 May 2013 — Ischia to Forio, 17.4 km (10.8 mi), team time trial (TTT)

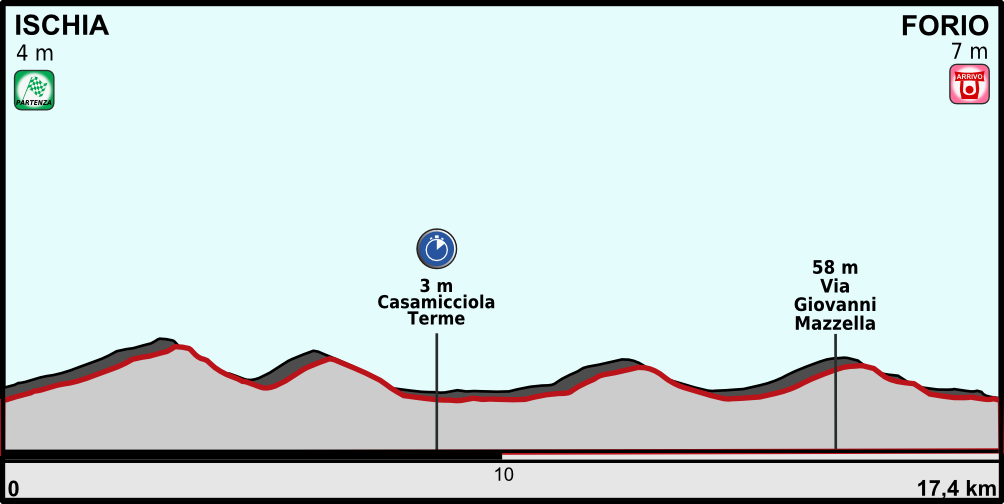

For the second stage of the race, the peloton was ferried over to the volcanic island of Ischia, which was hosting the Giro d'Italia for the first time in 54 years. On that occasion, an individual time trial over a course of 31 km (19.3 mi) was contested; which was won by Antonino Catalano, taking his only Giro stage victory, beating every other member of the peloton – with the exception of Jacques Anquetil – by over a minute. For Ischia's appearance in the 2013 race, a technical, undulating parcours of 17.4 km (10.8 mi) was set aside for the team time trial, including gradients of approaching 7% for a period within the final 5 km (3.1 mi) of the course. The start order for the stage was primarily set by the reverse order of how each of the 23 teams were ranked in the Trofeo Fast Team standings after the previous day's opening stage; the only exception was that Omega Pharma–Quick-Step would set off last, as Mark Cavendish was in possession of the maglia rosa, as the general classification leader.

Colombia were the first team to start – each team setting off thereafter, at three-minute intervals – and only shed one rider from their train by the time they reached the finish in a time of 23' 01", but that time was beaten by the next squad on the course, as Ag2r–La Mondiale went below 23 minutes, recording a time of 22' 55". Blanco Pro Cycling were next onto the stage, and were comfortably quicker, as they were 22 seconds faster for the course. Their time was not beaten until Team Sky hit the course, and despite early problems for several of their team, they came across the line in a time of 22' 05". As it turned out, the time was not to be beaten, giving the squad their second team time trial victory of the season after a victory in the discipline at the Giro del Trentino. By the end of the stage, only one team – the Movistar Team – remained within ten seconds, having recorded a quicker time, by two seconds, to the intermediate point in Casamicciola Terme. Cavendish surrendered the leader's jersey, as Omega Pharma–Quick-Step could only record the seventeenth best time, 48 seconds down on Team Sky. As a result, Salvatore Puccio became the race leader, as of the five remaining members of the Team Sky train at the finish, he had placed highest on the opening stage.

Stage 2 result

	Team	Time
1	Team Sky	22' 05"
2	Movistar Team	+ 9"
3	Astana	+ 14"
4	Team Katusha	+ 19"
5	Vini Fantini–Selle Italia	+ 22"
6	Lampre–Merida	+ 22"
7	Garmin–Sharp	+ 25"
8	Blanco Pro Cycling	+ 28"
9	Vacansoleil–DCM	+ 34"
10	Orica–GreenEDGE	+ 35"

General classification after stage 2

	Rider	Team	Time
1	Salvatore Puccio (ITA)	Team Sky	3h 20' 43"
2	Bradley Wiggins (GBR)	Team Sky	+ 0"
3	Sergio Henao (COL)	Team Sky	+ 0"
4	Dario Cataldo (ITA)	Team Sky	+ 0"
5	Rigoberto Urán (COL)	Team Sky	+ 0"
6	Beñat Intxausti (ESP)	Movistar Team	+ 9"
7	Giovanni Visconti (ITA)	Movistar Team	+ 9"
8	José Herrada (ESP)	Movistar Team	+ 9"
9	Alex Dowsett (GBR)	Movistar Team	+ 9"
10	Eros Capecchi (ITA)	Movistar Team	+ 9"

== Stage 3 ==
6 May 2013 — Sorrento to Marina di Ascea, 222 km (137.9 mi)

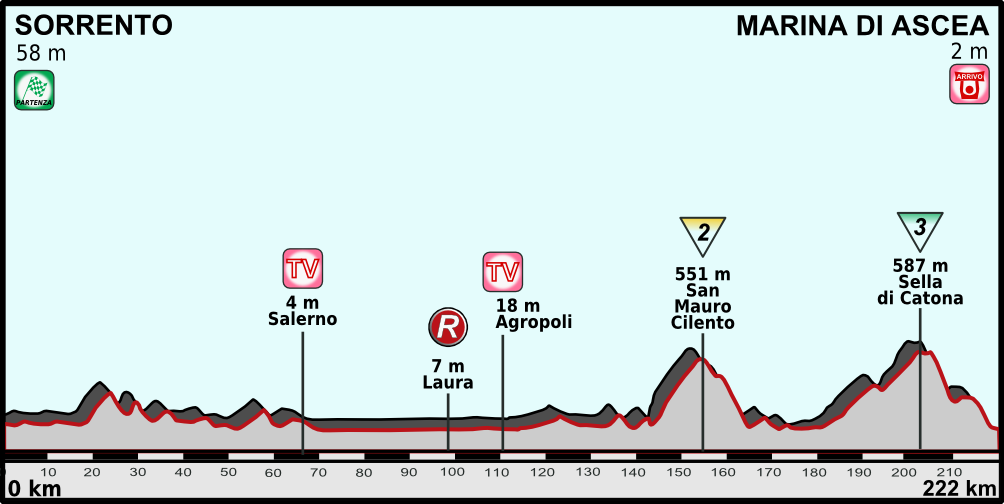

Back on the mainland after its foray to Ischia, the third stage of the 2013 Giro was split into three distinct sections. From the start in Sorrento, the peloton completed two circuits of a 7.2 km (4.5 mi) loop before making an undulating way along the Amalfi coast to Salerno. Upon reaching Salerno – where the first of two intermediate sprint points was held, along with one at Agropoli – the route remained relatively flat for the next 80 km (49.7 mi). The day's two categorised climbs came within the final third of the stage; the second-category San Mauro Cilento, averaging 6.7% over 7.8 km (4.8 mi), with gradients reaching 16% in the opening metres of the climb, and the third-category Sella di Catona, averaging 6.6% over 8 km (5.0 mi). From the top of the Sella di Catona, there was a near-20 km (12.4 mi) descent into the finish town of Ascea.

The day's breakaway was formed immediately after the start in Sorrento, with seven riders going clear to establish an advantage; the best of which was Fabio Taborre of the Vini Fantini–Selle Italia team, who trailed the overall leader Salvatore Puccio (Team Sky) by 22 seconds overnight. Despite this, the septet was allowed to establish an advantage of over seven minutes at its maximum. On the San Mauro Cilento, the breakaway was down to six riders as Bert De Backer (Argos–Shimano) lost contact with his companions. Vacansoleil–DCM rider Willem Wauters led over the climb, while the peloton came across the top around 3' 45" down on the lead sextet, with De Backer in between. A group of sprinters fell off the back of the peloton, including Omega Pharma–Quick-Step's Mark Cavendish and Nacer Bouhanni of FDJ, but both were able to rejoin.

Taborre attacked on the descent from the climb, gaining an advantage of over a minute at one point, reaching the foot of the Sella di Catona with such a lead. Garmin–Sharp upped the pace in the peloton, which enabled the group to overcome the remnants of the breakaway group, and at one point, caused a fracture in the main field which saw a group of overall contenders including Ryder Hesjedal, Vincenzo Nibali, Bradley Wiggins and Michele Scarponi to get clear. Hesjedal then attacked solo from this group, passing Taborre, before slowing up and returned to the main group. On the descent, Nibali's Astana team-mate Valerio Agnoli pushed on and had Hesjedal and Team Katusha's Luca Paolini join him. This group was brought back, with Team Sky keeping the pace high. Paolini attacked again with around 7 km (4.3 mi) remaining, and was not to be caught, taking his first stage win in his début Giro, and the maglia rosa from Puccio, who lost seven minutes. BMC Racing Team rider Cadel Evans led home a sixteen-rider select group sixteen seconds behind, ahead of Hesjedal.

Stage 3 result

	Rider	Team	Time
1	Luca Paolini (ITA)	Team Katusha	5h 43' 50"
2	Cadel Evans (AUS)	BMC Racing Team	+ 16"
3	Ryder Hesjedal (CAN)	Garmin–Sharp	+ 16"
4	Mauro Santambrogio (ITA)	Vini Fantini–Selle Italia	+ 16"
5	Samuel Sánchez (ESP)	Euskaltel–Euskadi	+ 16"
6	Giampaolo Caruso (ITA)	Team Katusha	+ 16"
7	Pieter Weening (NED)	Orica–GreenEDGE	+ 16"
8	Bradley Wiggins (GBR)	Team Sky	+ 16"
9	Beñat Intxausti (ESP)	Movistar Team	+ 16"
10	Robert Gesink (NED)	Blanco Pro Cycling	+ 16"

General classification after stage 3

	Rider	Team	Time
1	Luca Paolini (ITA)	Team Katusha	9h 04' 32"
2	Bradley Wiggins (GBR)	Team Sky	+ 17"
3	Rigoberto Urán (COL)	Team Sky	+ 17"
4	Beñat Intxausti (ESP)	Movistar Team	+ 26"
5	Vincenzo Nibali (ITA)	Astana	+ 31"
6	Valerio Agnoli (ITA)	Astana	+ 31"
7	Ryder Hesjedal (CAN)	Garmin–Sharp	+ 34"
8	Giampaolo Caruso (ITA)	Team Katusha	+ 36"
9	Yuri Trofimov (RUS)	Team Katusha	+ 36"
10	Sergio Henao (COL)	Team Sky	+ 37"

== Stage 4 ==
7 May 2013 — Policastro Bussentino to Serra San Bruno, 246 km (152.9 mi)

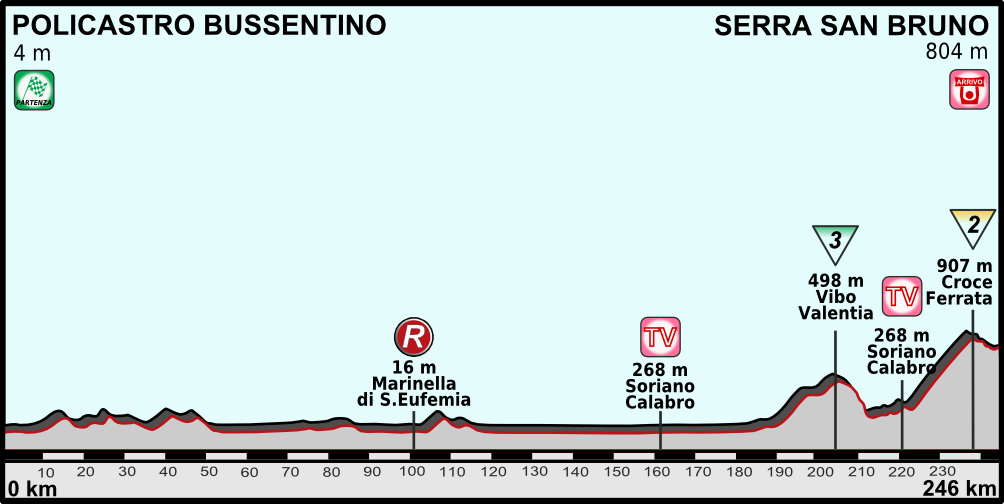

The race continued to make its way along the coast of the Tyrrhenian Sea, heading southwards to the southernmost point of the 2013 Giro d'Italia with the finish in Serra San Bruno. With a parcours of 246 km (152.9 mi), the fourth stage was also the second longest of the entire race, with only the thirteenth stage involving a longer day in the saddle. The stage was predominantly flat, with only the final quarter of the stage involving sizable shifts in altitude, with two categorised climbs as part of the parcours, for the second day in succession. The third-category Vibo Valentia climb was slow and progressional, as it averaged only 3% over 15 km (9.3 mi), before the second-category Croce Ferrata. Incorporating the second intermediate sprint at Soriano Calabro, the climb itself was 16.8 km (10.4 mi) long, and reached a maximum gradient of 10%. A descent of almost 7 km (4.3 mi) followed towards the finish in Serra San Bruno, with most of the final kilometre being run on cobblestones.

Just like the previous day, the day's main breakaway was made up of seven riders, with the best-placed among the septet being Emanuele Sella (Androni Giocattoli–Venezuela), who trailed race leader Luca Paolini of Team Katusha by 2' 39" overnight. The group managed to build up an advantage of around eight minutes at one point during the stage. Paolini's team maintained their presence at the front of the peloton, cutting the advantage by half by the time the race reached the 100 km (62.1 mi) mark. The lead group split at this point, with Sella, Ioannis Tamouridis (Euskaltel–Euskadi) and FDJ's Anthony Roux gradually falling back to the main group. The lead then went back up to 5' 10", before falling substantially prior to the first climb of the day, the Vibo Valentia, to about one minute.

Tamouridis' team-mate Miguel Mínguez attacked on the climb, and was the last member of the breakaway to be brought back by the main field, eventually doing so with 42 km (26.1 mi) remaining. There were several mini-attacks from there, lasting all the way to the foot of the other climb, the Croce Ferrata, where Ag2r–La Mondiale's Sylvain Georges attacked out of a six-rider move at the bottom; he managed to establish a maximum lead of over a minute, before Team Sky moved to the front of the peloton. Vini Fantini–Selle Italia's Danilo Di Luca and Robinson Chalapud (Colombia) attacked out of the peloton and soon passed Georges on the road, maintaining a small gap over the main field. Di Luca launched a long sprint for the line, doing so from around 800 metres (2,600 ft) out, and was not caught until 250 metres (820 ft) to go. From there, Bardiani Valvole–CSF Inox's Enrico Battaglin finished strongest to take the biggest win of his short professional career, by two lengths ahead of Sella's team-mate Fabio Felline and the Movistar Team's Giovanni Visconti, who had earlier done enough to regain the mountains classification lead. Paolini retained the maglia rosa after finishing tenth on the stage.

Stage 4 result

	Rider	Team	Time
1	Enrico Battaglin (ITA)	Bardiani Valvole–CSF Inox	6h 14' 19"
2	Fabio Felline (ITA)	Androni Giocattoli–Venezuela	s.t.
3	Giovanni Visconti (ITA)	Movistar Team	s.t.
4	Rigoberto Urán (COL)	Team Sky	s.t.
5	Arnold Jeannesson (FRA)	FDJ	s.t.
6	Cadel Evans (AUS)	BMC Racing Team	s.t.
7	Beñat Intxausti (ESP)	Movistar Team	s.t.
8	Ryder Hesjedal (CAN)	Garmin–Sharp	s.t.
9	Robert Kišerlovski (CRO)	RadioShack–Leopard	s.t.
10	Luca Paolini (ITA)	Team Katusha	s.t.

General classification after stage 4

	Rider	Team	Time
1	Luca Paolini (ITA)	Team Katusha	15h 18' 51"
2	Rigoberto Urán (COL)	Team Sky	+ 17"
3	Beñat Intxausti (ESP)	Movistar Team	+ 26"
4	Vincenzo Nibali (ITA)	Astana	+ 31"
5	Ryder Hesjedal (CAN)	Garmin–Sharp	+ 34"
6	Bradley Wiggins (GBR)	Team Sky	+ 34"
7	Giampaolo Caruso (ITA)	Team Katusha	+ 36"
8	Sergio Henao (COL)	Team Sky	+ 37"
9	Mauro Santambrogio (ITA)	Vini Fantini–Selle Italia	+ 39"
10	Cadel Evans (AUS)	BMC Racing Team	+ 42"

== Stage 5 ==
8 May 2013 — Cosenza to Matera, 203 km (126.1 mi)

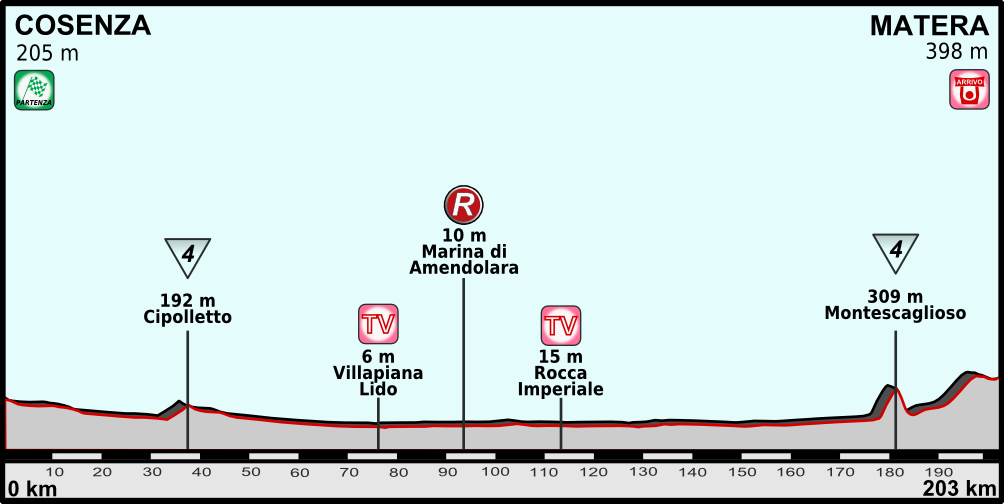

Another predominantly flat stage, the fifth stage started with a gradual downhill stretch from the start town of Cosenza, before a fourth-category ascent at Cipolletto, after around 37 km (23.0 mi) of racing. From there, the race meandered its way back to coastal roads, taking in intermediate sprint points at Villapiana Lido and Rocca Imperiale. With around 45 km (28.0 mi) remaining, the route turned away from the coast, and headed towards the finish town of Matera. On the run-in was another fourth-category climb at Montescaglioso, before a gradual uphill finish in Matera; the roads rose by 2.6% within the final kilometre before the finish on the Via Dante Alighieri. It was expected to disadvantage out-and-out sprinters, but favour sprinters with climbing capabilities, such as Argos–Shimano's John Degenkolb, and Orica–GreenEDGE rider Matthew Goss.

Six riders formed the primary breakaway for the day, establishing their advantage from the 6 km (3.7 mi) points onwards. The best placed of the sextet was Stefano Pirazzi of the Bardiani Valvole–CSF Inox team, who trailed overall leader Luca Paolini (Team Katusha) by just over three minutes overnight; after he claimed maximum points at the first climb at Cipolletto, Pirazzi sat up from the lead group and returned the peloton. After Pirazzi dropped back, the peloton slowed their pace substantially, and the five-man lead group were allowed to build up a lead of almost ten minutes on the stage. The weather changed on the route; having started in bright sunshine, heavy rain hit the peloton with around 60 km (37.3 mi) making conditions treacherous on the roads. The lead group's advantage was continually brought back on the route, holding a lead of just over 30 seconds by the time they reached the final climb at Montescaglioso.

The lead five riders were brought back one-by-one, with the last rider to be caught being Ricardo Mestre of the Euskaltel–Euskadi team, with about 22 km (13.7 mi) to go. Pirazzi attacked on the climb in the hope of gaining more points to the mountains classification – ultimately crossing the summit in first position – but was joined on the descent by Ag2r–La Mondiale's Ben Gastauer. Gastauer soon left Pirazzi behind and was joined by Mestre's team-mate Robert Vrečer. Lotto–Belisol rider Lars Bak also provided assistance to the group within the final 10 km (6.2 mi), but the trio were ultimately caught. Marco Canola led the field into the final kilometre for Bardiani Valvole–CSF Inox, with Degenkolb's lead-out man Luka Mezgec falling to the tarmac on the still-wet roads, meaning Degenkolb had to chase Canola on his own; he caught up with him, and soon sprinted away to his first stage win at the Giro, and his sixth Grand Tour stage win.

Stage 5 result

	Rider	Team	Time
1	John Degenkolb (GER)	Argos–Shimano	4h 37' 48"
2	Ángel Vicioso (ESP)	Team Katusha	s.t.
3	Paul Martens (GER)	Blanco Pro Cycling	s.t.
4	Sergio Henao (COL)	Team Sky	s.t.
5	Matteo Trentin (ITA)	Omega Pharma–Quick-Step	s.t.
6	Jarlinson Pantano (COL)	Colombia	s.t.
7	Daniel Oss (ITA)	BMC Racing Team	s.t.
8	Jens Keukeleire (BEL)	Orica–GreenEDGE	s.t.
9	Grega Bole (SLO)	Vacansoleil–DCM	s.t.
10	Tanel Kangert (EST)	Astana	s.t.

General classification after stage 5

	Rider	Team	Time
1	Luca Paolini (ITA)	Team Katusha	19h 56' 39"
2	Rigoberto Urán (COL)	Team Sky	+ 17"
3	Beñat Intxausti (ESP)	Movistar Team	+ 26"
4	Vincenzo Nibali (ITA)	Astana	+ 31"
5	Ryder Hesjedal (CAN)	Garmin–Sharp	+ 34"
6	Bradley Wiggins (GBR)	Team Sky	+ 34"
7	Giampaolo Caruso (ITA)	Team Katusha	+ 36"
8	Sergio Henao (COL)	Team Sky	+ 37"
9	Mauro Santambrogio (ITA)	Vini Fantini–Selle Italia	+ 39"
10	Cadel Evans (AUS)	BMC Racing Team	+ 42"

== Stage 6 ==
9 May 2013 — Mola di Bari to Margherita di Savoia, 169 km (105.0 mi)

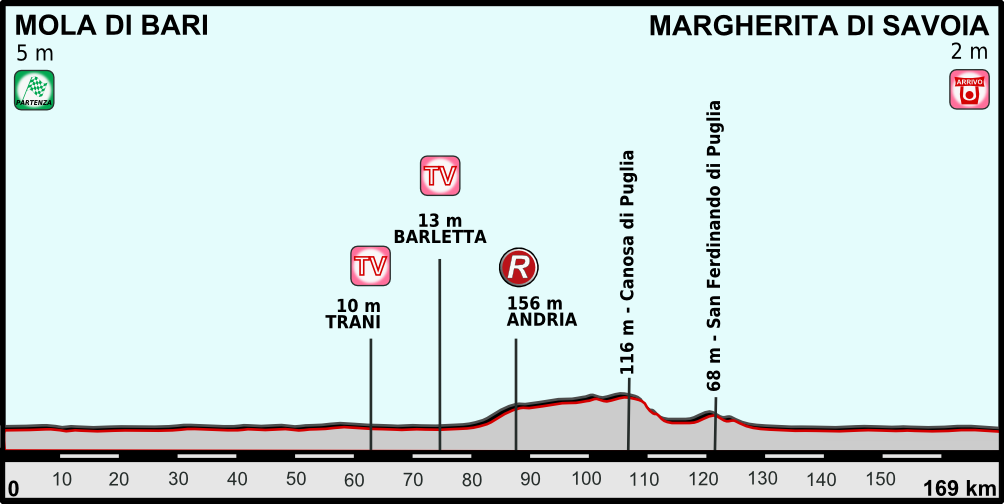

The sixth stage of the Giro d'Italia was seen as one of the most sprinter-friendly stages of the race, with the parcours being run largely at sea level, on the coast of the Adriatic Sea. The course meandered inland after the second of the day's intermediate sprint points at Barletta – the first coming 11 km (6.8 mi) prior in the town of Trani – with a slight ascent of a small hill, but nothing categorised towards the mountains classification. The route headed back to the coast for the finish in Margherita di Savoia, where around two-and-a-half laps of a 16.3 km (10.1 mi)-long circuit were completed before the expected sprint finish. The day's breakaway was all-Australian, as Blanco Pro Cycling's Jack Bobridge was joined by Cameron Wurf of Cannondale – who featured in the breakaway on the opening day – as they got clear after numerous smaller attacks had been brought back within the opening 15 km (9.3 mi), gaining an advantage of six and a half minutes at one point during the stage, before the sprinters' teams started the chase.

Wurf's team-mates were twice able to launch Elia Viviani to gain points on Omega Pharma–Quick-Step's Mark Cavendish, in relation to the points classification, at each of the intermediate sprint points. Prior to the first passage through the finish line, the two leaders were brought back and almost immediately after, there was a large crash in the main field, which blocked the road momentarily. The group split, but ultimately came back together within 10 km (6.2 mi) and set up the sprint finish. Argos–Shimano led into the final kilometre, but Omega Pharma–Quick-Step soon came to the fore with Gert Steegmans launching Cavendish for his second stage win of the race, and his 38th Grand Tour stage win. After praising the lead-out of his team-mates, Cavendish dedicated his victory on the podium to Wouter Weylandt, by holding a dossard with the number 108 on it, the number Weylandt had been competing with during the 2011 Giro d'Italia, when he was killed during the third stage, held on 9 May. He also regained the lead of the points classification from overall leader Luca Paolini, who maintained the maglia rosa.

Stage 6 result

	Rider	Team	Time
1	Mark Cavendish (GBR)	Omega Pharma–Quick-Step	3h 56' 03"
2	Elia Viviani (ITA)	Cannondale	s.t.
3	Matthew Goss (AUS)	Orica–GreenEDGE	s.t.
4	Nacer Bouhanni (FRA)	FDJ	s.t.
5	Mattia Gavazzi (ITA)	Androni Giocattoli–Venezuela	s.t.
6	Manuel Belletti (ITA)	Ag2r–La Mondiale	s.t.
7	Davide Appollonio (ITA)	Ag2r–La Mondiale	s.t.
8	Giacomo Nizzolo (ITA)	RadioShack–Leopard	s.t.
9	Matti Breschel (DEN)	Saxo–Tinkoff	s.t.
10	Roberto Ferrari (ITA)	Lampre–Merida	s.t.

General classification after stage 6

	Rider	Team	Time
1	Luca Paolini (ITA)	Team Katusha	23h 52' 42"
2	Rigoberto Urán (COL)	Team Sky	+ 17"
3	Beñat Intxausti (ESP)	Movistar Team	+ 26"
4	Vincenzo Nibali (ITA)	Astana	+ 31"
5	Ryder Hesjedal (CAN)	Garmin–Sharp	+ 34"
6	Bradley Wiggins (GBR)	Team Sky	+ 34"
7	Giampaolo Caruso (ITA)	Team Katusha	+ 36"
8	Sergio Henao (COL)	Team Sky	+ 37"
9	Mauro Santambrogio (ITA)	Vini Fantini–Selle Italia	+ 39"
10	Cadel Evans (AUS)	BMC Racing Team	+ 42"

== Stage 7 ==
10 May 2013 — Marina di San Salvo to Pescara, 177 km (110.0 mi)

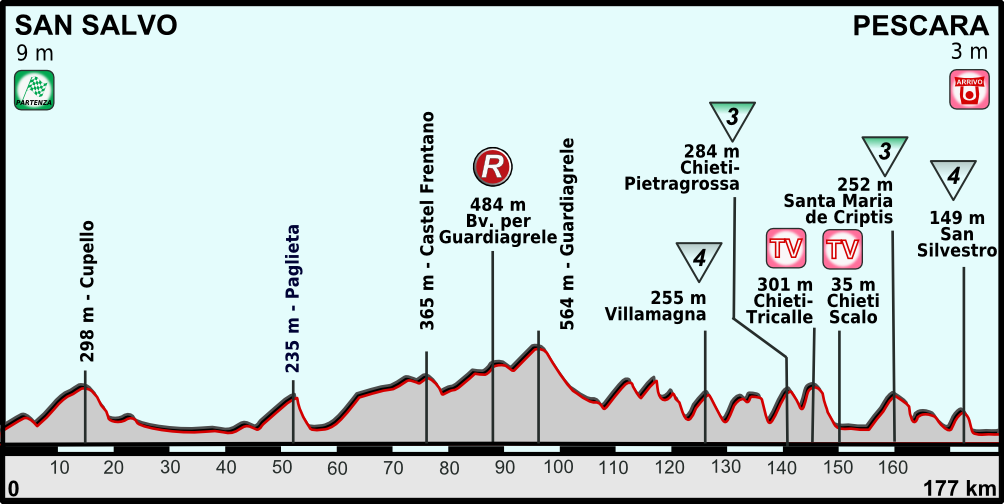

An undulating parcours of 177 km (110.0 mi) awaited the riders for the seventh stage of the 2013 Giro d'Italia, starting and finishing on the coast of the Adriatic Sea. However, most of the day's action was scheduled for inland, and in the second half of the stage; within the final 60 km (37.3 mi), there were four categorised climbs – two third-category and two fourth-category ascents respectively – as well as the day's two intermediate sprints, coming in Chieti (most notably, a frequent stage finishing town for the early-season Tirreno–Adriatico stage race) and in Chieti Scalo. The final climb of the San Silvestro came with just 7.4 km (4.6 mi) remaining before the pan-flat finish to in Pescara, just 3 metres (10 ft) above sea level.

Fabio Taborre (Vini Fantini–Selle Italia) launched the first attack of the day, but it was not until a group of six riders had formed that the breakaway was allowed to break free and establish an advantage; the best-placed rider amongst them was Androni Giocattoli–Venezuela rider Emanuele Sella, who trailed overall leader Luca Paolini of Team Katusha by just under seven minutes. The sextet built up a lead of almost seven and a half minutes around halfway through the stage, before Taborre and his team-mates – as well as Paolini's team – set about trying to reduce the lead. The lead group split on the second climb in Chieti, when Sella and Adam Hansen of Lotto–Belisol, were able to drop the four other members of the breakaway. Rain was also making riding conditions difficult, with Sella being caught out while cornering; Hansen waited for his fellow escapee before regaining the momentum to gap the main field. Hansen was able to drop Sella on the third of the four climbs, the third-category, 5.9% average gradient ascent of the Santa Maria de Criptis, reaching the top of the climb with an advantage of some 30 seconds.

In the main field, Astana's Tanel Kangert and Vini Fantini–Selle Italia rider Danilo Di Luca both launched combative moves off the front, while at the bottom of the final climb, Kangert's team-mate Vincenzo Nibali fell to the ground due to the slippery conditions. The main field had split at this point, with Team Sky missing the junction, leaving Bradley Wiggins in a chasing group. Sella – who was in between the lead and the peloton – crashed with around 5 km (3.1 mi) remaining, with the same corner later catching out Wiggins, who later elected to gingerly descend the rest of the hill, losing more time to the main group. At the front, Hansen – who completed all three Grand Tours in 2012 – was still out front and soloed away to his first win since 2010. A 27-rider group came across the line just over a minute later, with Bardiani Valvole–CSF Inox's Enrico Battaglin leading the group. The majority of the race favourites were within this group, with the exception of Wiggins, who lost nearly 90 seconds more than that, dropping outside the top 20 overall. Paolini was also in that group, and thus surrendered the lead of the race to the Movistar Team's Beñat Intxausti, with Nibali and Garmin–Sharp's Ryder Hesjedal within ten seconds ahead of the following day's time trial.

Stage 7 result

	Rider	Team	Time
1	Adam Hansen (AUS)	Lotto–Belisol	4h 35' 49"
2	Enrico Battaglin (ITA)	Bardiani Valvole–CSF Inox	+ 1' 07"
3	Danilo Di Luca (ITA)	Vini Fantini–Selle Italia	+ 1' 07"
4	Mauro Santambrogio (ITA)	Vini Fantini–Selle Italia	+ 1' 07"
5	Damiano Caruso (ITA)	Cannondale	+ 1' 07"
6	Cadel Evans (AUS)	BMC Racing Team	+ 1' 07"
7	Stefano Pirazzi (ITA)	Bardiani Valvole–CSF Inox	+ 1' 07"
8	Arnold Jeannesson (FRA)	FDJ	+ 1' 07"
9	Pieter Weening (NED)	Orica–GreenEDGE	+ 1' 07"
10	Ryder Hesjedal (CAN)	Garmin–Sharp	+ 1' 07"

General classification after stage 7

	Rider	Team	Time
1	Beñat Intxausti (ESP)	Movistar Team	28h 30' 04"
2	Vincenzo Nibali (ITA)	Astana	+ 5"
3	Ryder Hesjedal (CAN)	Garmin–Sharp	+ 8"
4	Giampaolo Caruso (ITA)	Team Katusha	+ 10"
5	Mauro Santambrogio (ITA)	Vini Fantini–Selle Italia	+ 13"
6	Cadel Evans (AUS)	BMC Racing Team	+ 16"
7	Robert Gesink (NED)	Blanco Pro Cycling	+ 19"
8	Ivan Santaromita (ITA)	BMC Racing Team	+ 26"
9	Pieter Weening (NED)	Orica–GreenEDGE	+ 29"
10	Robert Kišerlovski (CRO)	RadioShack–Leopard	+ 34"

== Stage 8 ==
11 May 2013 — Gabicce Mare to Saltara, 54.8 km (34.1 mi), individual time trial (ITT)

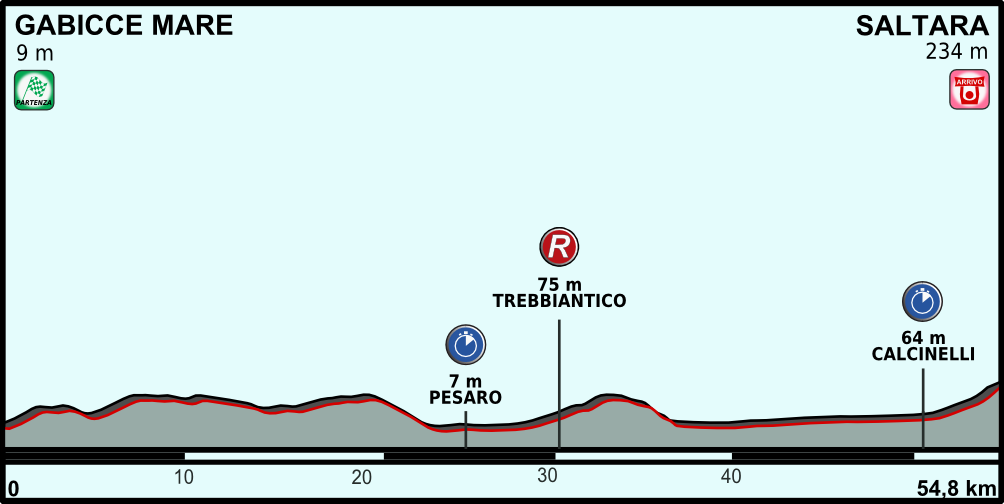

The first of two individual time trials to be held in the 2013 Giro d'Italia, the eighth stage was the longest such test against the clock to feature in the race since 2009. On that occasion, then-Rabobank rider Denis Menchov won the stage after completing the 60.6 km (37.7 mi) course, in the Cinque Terre, in a time just over 94 minutes. The Marche region played host to the 54.8 km (34.1 mi) parcours, with a twisty, technical course, but not overly mountainous unlike 2009. The final 3.5 km (2.2 mi) of the course was also set to test the riders; from the second intermediate time-check in Calcinelli, the riders steadily climbed towards the finish at the Villa del Balì in Saltara, with an 11.2% average gradient climb coming within the final kilometre. As was customary of time trial stages, the riders set off in reverse order from where they were ranked in the general classification at the end of the previous stage. Thus, Jack Bobridge of Blanco Pro Cycling, who, in 201st place – of the 207 riders who started the race – trailed overall leader Beñat Intxausti (Movistar Team) by one hour, twenty-four minutes and twelve seconds, was the first rider to set off on the stage.

Although Bobridge was first into the stage, he was not the first to finish, as Team Katusha's Maxim Belkov – who started the stage three minutes behind Bobridge, at one-minute intervals – recorded a time of one hour, twenty-one minutes and thirty-two seconds for the course; Bobridge finished three minutes further later, losing six minutes in total to Belkov. Belkov's time remained at the top of the time-sheets for around fifteen minutes before RadioShack–Leopard rider Jesse Sergent took over at the top, beating Belkov's time by 3' 05". Again, Sergent held the top spot for around the same length of time as what Belkov did, before the eventual stage-winning time was recorded. British national champion Alex Dowsett (Movistar Team) set the fastest time at each of the intermediate splits, and ultimately recorded a time exactly two minutes quicker than Sergent, in a time of one hour, sixteen minutes and twenty-seven seconds. In his début Grand Tour, Dowsett achieved his first stage victory since the 2011 Tour of Britain, also in an individual time trial.

Among the overall contenders, Team Sky's Bradley Wiggins was considered as the pre-stage favourite, but was not expected to take the maglia rosa after losing time the previous day into Pescara. Wiggins caught his minute-man Danilo Di Luca (Vini Fantini–Selle Italia) in the early part of the stage, but he had stop several minutes later with a puncture; he threw his bike to the ground, before receiving a new bike from his mechanics. Although he was 52 seconds down on Dowsett at the first split, Wiggins had reduced the gap to just 10 at the finish, which was the closest anyone got to Dowsett. Lampre–Merida's Michele Scarponi put in a solid performance to lose just 43 seconds to Wiggins, while the BMC Racing Team's Cadel Evans lost 29 to remain 47 seconds ahead of him, in the overall classification. Evans also moved up to second overall, as Astana's Vincenzo Nibali became the new leader. Nibali went quicker than Dowsett to the first intermediate, but faded in the second portion of the course, finishing fourth on the stage – just behind team-mate Tanel Kangert – losing eleven seconds to Wiggins, but maintained a 1' 16" lead over him overall.

Stage 8 result

	Rider	Team	Time
1	Alex Dowsett (GBR)	Movistar Team	1h 16' 27"
2	Bradley Wiggins (GBR)	Team Sky	+ 10"
3	Tanel Kangert (EST)	Astana	+ 14"
4	Vincenzo Nibali (ITA)	Astana	+ 21"
5	Stef Clement (NED)	Blanco Pro Cycling	+ 32"
6	Luke Durbridge (AUS)	Orica–GreenEDGE	+ 35"
7	Cadel Evans (AUS)	BMC Racing Team	+ 39"
8	Manuele Boaro (ITA)	Saxo–Tinkoff	+ 45"
9	Sergio Henao (COL)	Team Sky	+ 53"
10	Michele Scarponi (ITA)	Lampre–Merida	+ 53"

General classification after stage 8

	Rider	Team	Time
1	Vincenzo Nibali (ITA)	Astana	29h 46' 57"
2	Cadel Evans (AUS)	BMC Racing Team	+ 29"
3	Robert Gesink (NED)	Blanco Pro Cycling	+ 1' 15"
4	Bradley Wiggins (GBR)	Team Sky	+ 1' 16"
5	Michele Scarponi (ITA)	Lampre–Merida	+ 1' 24"
6	Ryder Hesjedal (CAN)	Garmin–Sharp	+ 2' 05"
7	Sergio Henao (COL)	Team Sky	+ 2' 11"
8	Mauro Santambrogio (ITA)	Vini Fantini–Selle Italia	+ 2' 43"
9	Przemysław Niemiec (POL)	Lampre–Merida	+ 2' 44"
10	Rigoberto Urán (COL)	Team Sky	+ 2' 49"

== Stage 9 ==
12 May 2013 — Sansepolcro to Firenze, 170 km (105.6 mi)

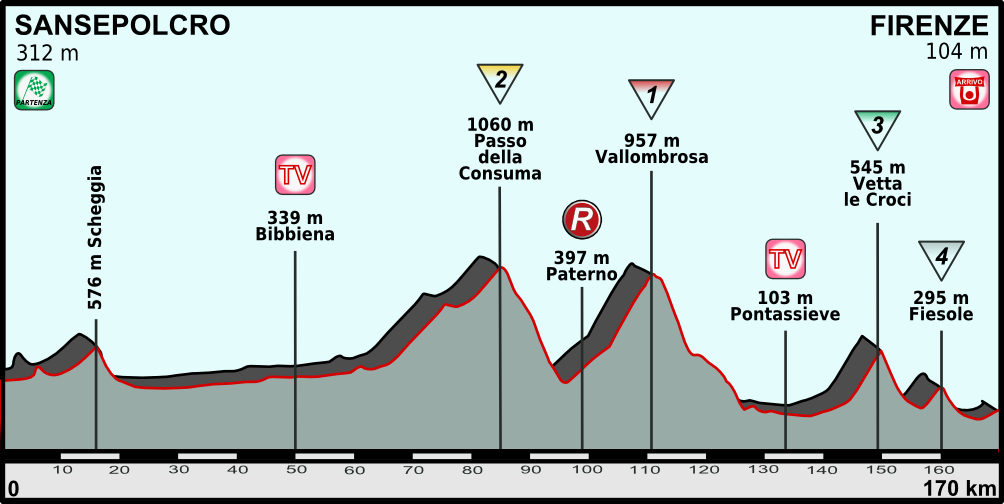

The ninth stage of the 2013 Giro d'Italia was the last to be contested before the first of two rest days to be held during the race, the following day. With an itinerary of 170 km (105.6 mi) through the mountains of Tuscany, it was to be expected that the breakaway would have a chance to achieve another stage victory, on roads expected to feature in September's UCI Road World Championships due to be held in the region. The parcours had a mix of categorised climbs throughout; for the four categorised climbs during the stage, each of the four categorisations available to the race organisers for ascents was implemented. The highest of these was the first-category Vallombrosa climb, but was not overly difficult at 6% over 9 km (5.6 mi). Two punchy climbs followed; the third-category Vetta le Croci averaged over 9% during the 4 km (2.5 mi) climb, while the Fiesole averaged 5.7%, before a 10 km (6.2 mi) run to the finish in Florence.

After an earlier seven-rider move had been brought back early in the stage, the day's breakaway came about at the 21 km (13.0 mi) point, with a group swelling to twelve riders going clear; the best placed among the group was Blanco Pro Cycling's Juan Manuel Gárate, who trailed overall leader Vincenzo Nibali (Astana) by 5' 42" overnight. The lead group split on the day's first climb, the Consuma Pass, when Colombia's Robinson Chalapud attacked along with Stefano Pirazzi of the Bardiani Valvole–CSF Inox team, with the duo being joined by Team Katusha rider Maxim Belkov on the descent from the climb. The trio were continuing to extend their lead over the main field, holding an advantage of over five minutes at that point. Belkov lost time on the second climb – where Pirazzi led Chalapud over the top again, in order to boost his position in the mountains classification – but was able to rejoin on the descent, once more.

Once Belkov had rejoined, he did not stay around long, accelerating down the road from Pirazzi and Chalapud. He had established an advantage of almost two minutes by the time that another three riders had joined up with Pirazzi and Chalapud, with around 40 km (24.9 mi) remaining of the stage; the chase group soon expanded to nine riders chasing after Belkov, who was over three and a half minutes clear with 25 km (15.5 mi) remaining. Belkov tired in the closing stages, but still did enough to win the stage by 44 seconds for his first professional victory. Behind, Jarlinson Pantano (Colombia) and Argos–Shimano's Tobias Ludvigsson had attacked out of the chase group, and had vainly set off in pursuit of Belkov. Both riders were ultimately beaten to the line by Ag2r–La Mondiale's Carlos Betancur, who attacked out of the peloton on the final climb; he mistakenly believed that he had won the stage, celebrating as he came across the line. Pantano beat Ludvigsson for third, while Cadel Evans (BMC Racing Team) led home the group of overall contenders not long after, taking the points classification lead in the process. One overall contender missing from the group however, was Ryder Hesjedal of Garmin–Sharp, who lost over a minute on the course, and dropped out of the top ten overall.

Stage 9 result

	Rider	Team	Time
1	Maxim Belkov (RUS)	Team Katusha	4h 31' 31"
2	Carlos Betancur (COL)	Ag2r–La Mondiale	+ 44"
3	Jarlinson Pantano (COL)	Colombia	+ 46"
4	Tobias Ludvigsson (SWE)	Argos–Shimano	+ 54"
5	Cadel Evans (AUS)	BMC Racing Team	+ 1' 03"
6	Beñat Intxausti (ESP)	Movistar Team	+ 1' 03"
7	Danilo Di Luca (ITA)	Vini Fantini–Selle Italia	+ 1' 03"
8	Mauro Santambrogio (ITA)	Vini Fantini–Selle Italia	+ 1' 03"
9	Damiano Caruso (ITA)	Cannondale	+ 1' 03"
10	Vincenzo Nibali (ITA)	Astana	+ 1' 03"

General classification after stage 9

	Rider	Team	Time
1	Vincenzo Nibali (ITA)	Astana	34h 19' 31"
2	Cadel Evans (AUS)	BMC Racing Team	+ 29"
3	Robert Gesink (NED)	Blanco Pro Cycling	+ 1' 15"
4	Bradley Wiggins (GBR)	Team Sky	+ 1' 16"
5	Michele Scarponi (ITA)	Lampre–Merida	+ 1' 24"
6	Sergio Henao (COL)	Team Sky	+ 2' 11"
7	Mauro Santambrogio (ITA)	Vini Fantini–Selle Italia	+ 2' 43"
8	Przemysław Niemiec (POL)	Lampre–Merida	+ 2' 44"
9	Rigoberto Urán (COL)	Team Sky	+ 2' 49"
10	Tanel Kangert (EST)	Astana	+ 3' 02"

== Stage 10 ==
14 May 2013 — Cordenons to Altopiano del Montasio, 167 km (103.8 mi)

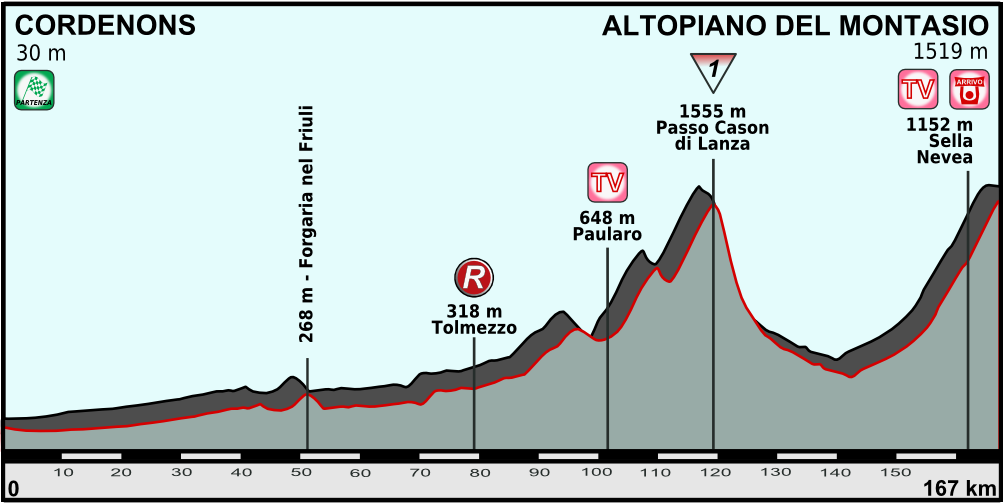

The race's first summit finish was key to its resumption after the first rest day the previous day; the 167 km (103.8 mi) parcours from Cordenons started with a gradual climb out of the starting town, with several small hills in the opening half of the stage. The roads started to climb towards more sharply after the day's first intermediate sprint point, coming with around 64 km (39.8 mi) to go in Paularo. From there, the riders began the climb of the Passo Cason di Lanza – a 14.5 km (9.0 mi) ascent from the bottom to the top, but with a downhill portion of just over 2.1 km (1.3 mi) – averaging a gradient of around 8.5%. A long gradual descent followed, towards the town of Chiusaforte before the ascent of the Altopiano del Montasio. After a sustained approach, the climb of 10.9 km (6.8 mi) ramped up immediately with 14% sections – sections reached 20% near the top of the climb – with the average being around 8%. The final kilometre was a false flat, averaging 3.2%, before the finish at 1,519 metres (4,984 ft) up.

A group of thirteen riders formed the day's breakaway, with the group being initiated at the 20 km (12.4 mi) mark of the stage, with their advantage over the main field reaching a maximum of around nine minutes at the mid-stage point. Team Sky moved to the front of the peloton as the first climb began, while at the front of the race, Androni Giocattoli–Venezuela rider Jackson Rodríguez attacked on his own. He was followed up the climb by RadioShack–Leopard's Tiago Machado, who had also attacked out of the group with Serge Pauwels of Omega Pharma–Quick-Step. The numbers in the peloton had reduced significantly thanks to the pace being set, before Rodríguez's team-mate Franco Pellizotti attacked from the group, beginning a chase of the leaders. Following his difficulties to remain with the overall contenders on the previous stage, defending Giro winner Ryder Hesjedal (Garmin–Sharp) again struggled to remain in contention, cracking on the climb. He lost almost 21 minutes by the stage's end.

Rodríguez began to suffer with mechanical problems on the descent from the climb, and after a change of machinery, he was joined by Pauwels at the front, after he had moved away from Machado; the duo reached the lower slopes of the final climb with a lead of around 2' 20" over the main field, still being led by Team Sky. This gap was wiped out before the steeper segments of the climb had commenced, with around 10 km (6.2 mi) remaining. Rigoberto Urán attacked several kilometres later, with Astana forced to try and chase down the move for race leader Vincenzo Nibali, through domestique Valerio Agnoli. Urán held a lead of around 50 seconds at one point during his attack, and ultimately soloed away to the stage victory. Fellow Colombian rider Carlos Betancur (Ag2r–La Mondiale) managed to get clear with around 1.5 km (0.9 mi) to go, and finished 19 seconds behind Urán, with the rest of the overall contenders coming across the line 12 seconds later, led home by Nibali. With eight bonus seconds gained at the line, Nibali extended his overall lead to 41 seconds over BMC Racing Team's Cadel Evans, while Urán moved ahead of team-mate Bradley Wiggins into third place, by one second.

Stage 10 result

	Rider	Team	Time
1	Rigoberto Urán (COL)	Team Sky	4h 37' 42"
2	Carlos Betancur (COL)	Ag2r–La Mondiale	+ 20"
3	Vincenzo Nibali (ITA)	Astana	+ 31"
4	Mauro Santambrogio (ITA)	Vini Fantini–Selle Italia	+ 31"
5	Cadel Evans (AUS)	BMC Racing Team	+ 31"
6	Rafał Majka (POL)	Saxo–Tinkoff	+ 31"
7	Domenico Pozzovivo (ITA)	Ag2r–La Mondiale	+ 31"
8	Robert Kišerlovski (CRO)	RadioShack–Leopard	+ 47"
9	Beñat Intxausti (ESP)	Movistar Team	+ 1' 06"
10	Bradley Wiggins (GBR)	Team Sky	+ 1' 08"

General classification after stage 10

	Rider	Team	Time
1	Vincenzo Nibali (ITA)	Astana	38h 57' 32"
2	Cadel Evans (AUS)	BMC Racing Team	+ 41"
3	Rigoberto Urán (COL)	Team Sky	+ 2' 04"
4	Bradley Wiggins (GBR)	Team Sky	+ 2' 05"
5	Robert Gesink (NED)	Blanco Pro Cycling	+ 2' 12"
6	Michele Scarponi (ITA)	Lampre–Merida	+ 2' 13"
7	Mauro Santambrogio (ITA)	Vini Fantini–Selle Italia	+ 2' 55"
8	Przemysław Niemiec (POL)	Lampre–Merida	+ 3' 35"
9	Domenico Pozzovivo (ITA)	Ag2r–La Mondiale	+ 4' 17"
10	Rafał Majka (POL)	Saxo–Tinkoff	+ 4' 21"

== Stage 11 ==
15 May 2013 — Tarvisio–Cave del Predil to Vajont–Erto e Casso, 182 km (113.1 mi)

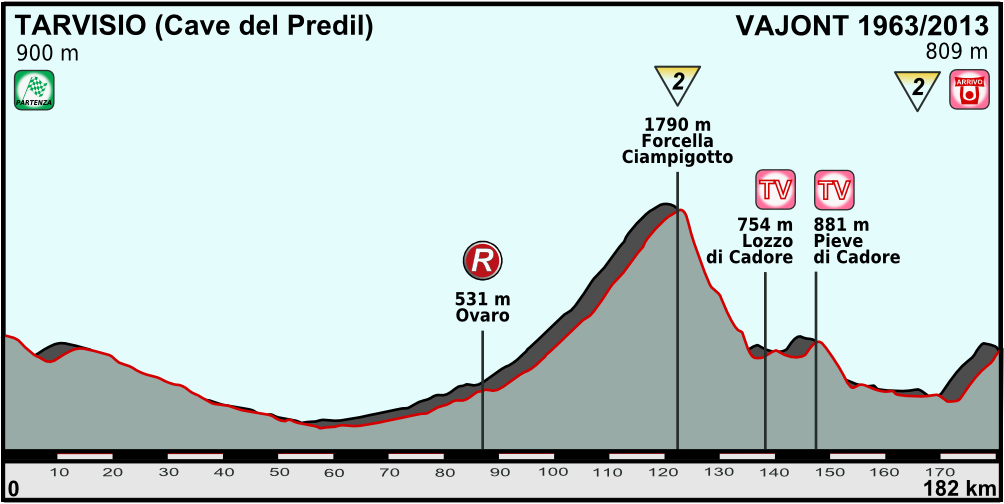

The midway point of the race was marked by a transitional stage across the Friuli-Venezia Giulia region, starting at the Cave del Predil around 15 km (9.3 mi) to the south of Tarvisio. After descending towards Tarvisio itself, the riders crested a small hill on the route at Camporosso, before descending gradually for around 50 km (31.1 mi). Having made their way through the feed zone at Ovaro – at the foot of the Monte Zoncolan, which featured in 2011 – the riders ascented the second-category Sella Ciampigotto, a rolling climb of around 4.5% in gradient. From there, the riders descended through the two intermediate sprint points – at Lozzo di Cadore and Pieve di Cadore – before the final kick up to the finish at Erto e Casso. The final climb was another rolling climb, with an average of around 5%, but the climb itself maxed out at 9% in places. The Vajont stage was held to commemorate victims of the Vajont Dam disaster in 1963, when a landslide caused major flooding in the Piave Valley, and the deaths of around 2,000 people.

Prior to the start, it was announced that Ag2r–La Mondiale rider Sylvain Georges – who had been lying 81st overall – had tested positive for heptaminol after the seventh stage, and he failed to start the stage. With descending key to the first hour of racing, the peloton remained together for the duration, before a twenty-rider breakaway group was allowed to form at the 75 km (46.6 mi) mark; 20 of the 23 teams that started the race were represented, with only Astana, Lampre–Merida and Lotto–Belisol not represented. The highest placed rider within the group was Vini Fantini–Selle Italia's Danilo Di Luca, who trailed overnight leader Vincenzo Nibali (Astana) by almost fourteen minutes overnight. The group built up a lead of around five minutes at the halfway point, prior to the day's first climb. After Stefano Pirazzi (Bardiani Valvole–CSF Inox) extended his mountains classification lead by placing second to Jackson Rodríguez of Androni Giocattoli–Venezuela at the summit, the group continued as one down the descent. The group held a lead of around five and a half minutes over the peloton, being led by Astana, who were setting the pace for Nibali.

Argos–Shimano rider Patrick Gretsch attacked the group, and set off to an advantage which eventually reached almost two minutes prior to the final climb. Di Luca tried to get away twice, but was unable to gain enough ground to breach the group; however, his move was the catalyst for another three riders to counter-attack, with Ag2r–La Mondiale's Guillaume Bonnafond being joined by Ramūnas Navardauskas of Garmin–Sharp – who wore the maglia rosa during the 2012 Giro d'Italia – and Daniel Oss of the BMC Racing Team. Bonnafond could not remain with his rivals, and soon dropped back to the group while Navardauskas and Oss set off in chase of Gretsch, catching him with around 17.5 km (10.9 mi) to go. Gretsch struggled to contribute to the pace, and ultimately cracked prior to the final climb. Navardauskas dropped Oss with several sharp accelerations at the 5 km (3.1 mi) to go mark, and soloed away to his first Grand Tour stage win by over a minute from Oss. Pirazzi broke away from the chasing group to take third – further extending his mountains lead – while the remainder of the group came home in small packs. The peloton came home almost six minutes down, although the Movistar Team's Beñat Intxausti was able to gain some time on the other overall contenders; a gap of 18 seconds was enough for Intxausti to move back into the top ten overall.

Stage 11 result

	Rider	Team	Time
1	Ramūnas Navardauskas (LTU)	Garmin–Sharp	4h 23' 14"
2	Daniel Oss (ITA)	BMC Racing Team	+ 1' 08"
3	Stefano Pirazzi (ITA)	Bardiani Valvole–CSF Inox	+ 2' 59"
4	Salvatore Puccio (ITA)	Team Sky	+ 3' 07"
5	Paul Martens (GER)	Blanco Pro Cycling	+ 3' 07"
6	Danilo Di Luca (ITA)	Vini Fantini–Selle Italia	+ 3' 07"
7	Egoi Martínez (ESP)	Euskaltel–Euskadi	+ 3' 07"
8	Serge Pauwels (BEL)	Omega Pharma–Quick-Step	+ 3' 10"
9	Evgeni Petrov (RUS)	Saxo–Tinkoff	+ 3' 11"
10	Jackson Rodríguez (VEN)	Androni Giocattoli–Venezuela	+ 3' 25"

General classification after stage 11

	Rider	Team	Time
1	Vincenzo Nibali (ITA)	Astana	43h 26' 27"
2	Cadel Evans (AUS)	BMC Racing Team	+ 41"
3	Rigoberto Urán (COL)	Team Sky	+ 2' 04"
4	Bradley Wiggins (GBR)	Team Sky	+ 2' 05"
5	Robert Gesink (NED)	Blanco Pro Cycling	+ 2' 12"
6	Michele Scarponi (ITA)	Lampre–Merida	+ 2' 13"
7	Mauro Santambrogio (ITA)	Vini Fantini–Selle Italia	+ 2' 55"
8	Przemysław Niemiec (POL)	Lampre–Merida	+ 3' 35"
9	Beñat Intxausti (ESP)	Movistar Team	+ 4' 05"
10	Domenico Pozzovivo (ITA)	Ag2r–La Mondiale	+ 4' 17"
