= List of highways numbered 109 =

Route 109 or Highway 109 can refer to multiple roads:

== Canada ==
- New Brunswick Route 109
- Ontario Highway 109
- Prince Edward Island Route 109
- Quebec Route 109

== China ==
- China National Highway 109

== Costa Rica ==
- National Route 109

== India ==
- National Highway 109 (India)

== Israel ==
- Route 109 (Israel)

== Nigeria ==
- F109 highway (Nigeria)

== Philippines ==
- N109 highway (Philippines)

== United Kingdom ==
- A109 road (England)
- B109 road

== United States ==
- U.S. Route 109 (former)
- Alabama State Route 109
- Arkansas Highway 109
- California State Route 109
- Colorado State Highway 109
- Connecticut Route 109
- Florida State Road 109
- Georgia State Route 109
- Illinois Route 109
- Indiana State Road 109
- Iowa Highway 109
- Kentucky Route 109
- Louisiana Highway 109
- Maine State Route 109
- Maryland Route 109
- Massachusetts Route 109
- M-109 (Michigan highway)
- Minnesota State Highway 109
  - County Road 109 (Hennepin County, Minnesota)
  - County Road 109 (Pine County, Minnesota)
- Missouri Route 109
- Nebraska Highway 109
  - Nebraska State Spur 109 (former)
- New Hampshire Route 109
  - New Hampshire Route 109A
- New Jersey Route 109
  - County Route 109 (Bergen County, New Jersey)
    - County Route S109 (Bergen County, New Jersey)
  - County Route 109 (Ocean County, New Jersey)
- New Mexico State Road 109
- New York State Route 109
  - County Route 109 (Cortland County, New York)
    - County Route 109A (Cortland County, New York)
  - County Route 109 (Erie County, New York)
  - County Route 109 (Fulton County, New York)
  - County Route 109 (Madison County, New York)
  - County Route 109 (Montgomery County, New York)
  - County Route 109 (Onondaga County, New York)
    - County Route 109A (Onondaga County, New York)
  - County Route 109 (Rockland County, New York)
  - County Route 109 (Sullivan County, New York)
  - County Route 109 (Tompkins County, New York)
- North Carolina Highway 109
  - North Carolina Highway 109A (Thomasville) (former)
  - North Carolina Highway 109A (Troy) (former)
- Ohio State Route 109
- Oklahoma State Highway 109
- South Carolina Highway 109
- South Dakota Highway 109
- Tennessee State Route 109
- Texas State Highway 109 (former)
  - Texas State Highway 109 (1939) (former)
  - Texas State Highway Loop 109
  - Farm to Market Road 109
- Utah State Route 109
- Vermont Route 109
- Virginia State Route 109
  - Virginia State Route 109 (1923-1928) (former)
  - Virginia State Route 109 (1928-1933) (former)
  - Virginia State Route 109 (1933-1946) (former)
- Washington State Route 109
- Wisconsin Highway 109

Territories

- Puerto Rico Highway 109

== See also ==
- A109
- B109 road
- D109 road
- List of national roads in Latvia § P109
- R109 road (Ireland)

Preceded by 108	Lists of highways 109	Succeeded by 110
