= Leonardo Gatto =

Italian footballer

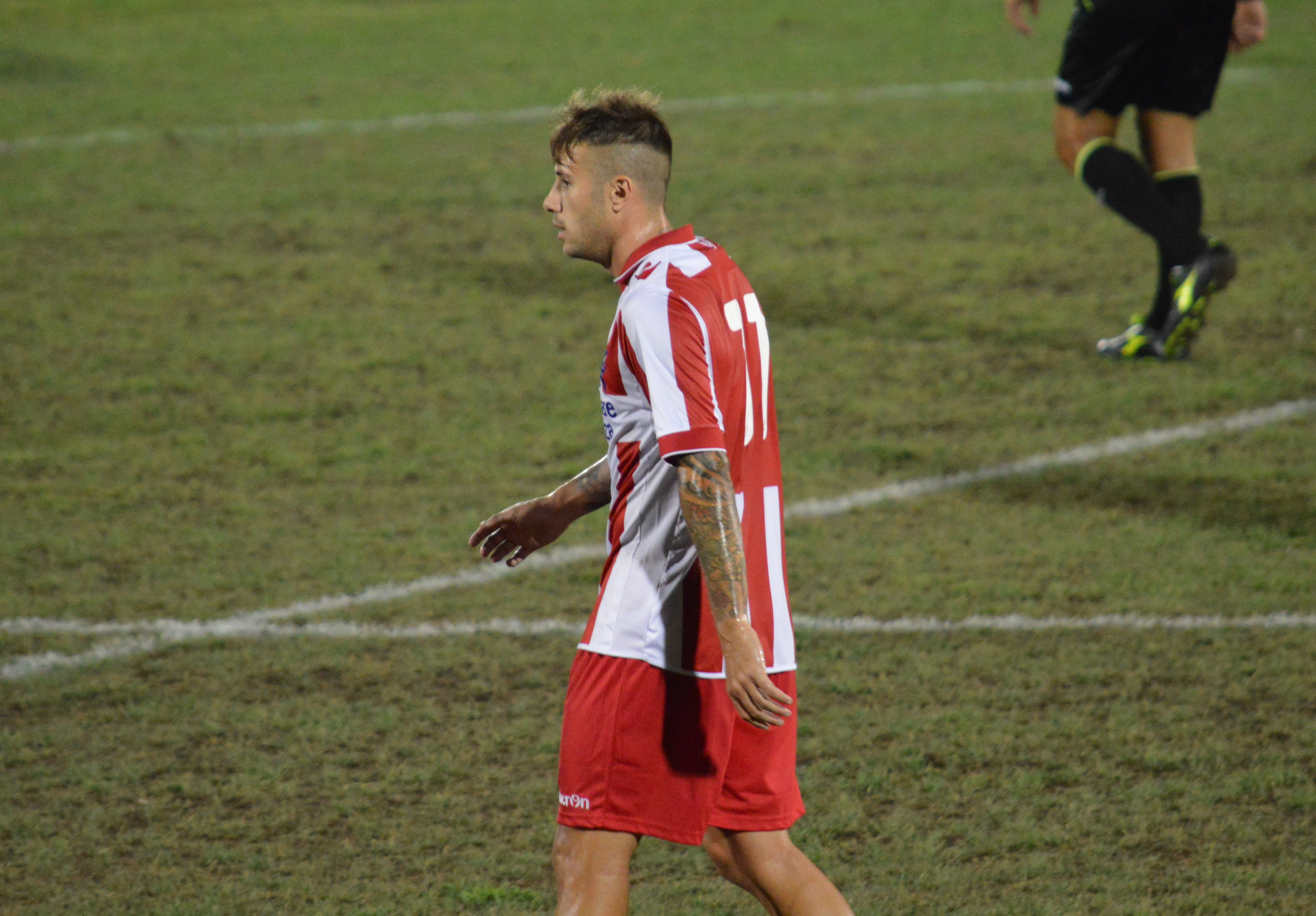

Personal information
- Full name: Leonardo Davide Gatto
- Date of birth: 28 April 1992 (age 34)
- Place of birth: Trebisacce, Italy
- Height: 1.79 m (5 ft 10 in)
- Position: Winger

Team information
- Current team: Sanremese
- Number: 32

Youth career
- Atalanta

Senior career*
Years	Team	Apps	(Gls)
2011–2013	Pisa	33	(4)
2013–2017	Atalanta	0	(0)
2013–2015	→ Lanciano (loan)	59	(9)
2015–2016	→ Vicenza (loan)	23	(2)
2016	→ Salernitana (loan)	19	(2)
2016–2017	→ Ascoli (loan)	33	(4)
2017–2018	Salernitana	12	(1)
2018–2020	Entella	18	(2)
2018–2019	→ Pro Vercelli (loan)	24	(2)
2019–2020	→ Triestina (loan)	26	(1)
2020–2021	Triestina	5	(0)
2021	→ Pro Vercelli (loan)	19	(1)
2021–2023	Pro Vercelli	45	(6)
2023–	Sanremese	7	(0)

International career
2011	Italy U20	2	(0)
2012–2013	Italy U20 "C"	4	(0)
2013	Italy U21	2	(0)
- * Club domestic league appearances and goals as of 20 December 2023

Leonardo Davide Gatto (born 28 April 1992) is an Italian footballer who plays as a midfielder for Serie D club Sanremese.

== Club career ==
=== Atalanta ===
Born in Trebisacce, Calabria, Gatto started his career at Lombard side Atalanta. Gatto was a member of U17 team in 2008–09 season; U18 in 2009–10 and the reserve in 2010–11.

=== Pisa ===
In July 2011 the club decided to gift Pisa half of the registration rights in order to farm out the player from the reserve, for a peppercorn of €250. In June 2012 the deal was renewed.

=== Return to Atalanta and loans ===
Gatto returned to Atalanta in June 2013 for €75,000.

In the same transfer window he was signed by Lanciano. In July 2014 the loan was renewed.

On 10 July 2015, he was signed by Vicenza in a temporary deal.

On 1 February 2016, Gatto was signed by Salernitana. He picked no.18 from departing Daniele Sciaudone.

In July 2016 Gatto was signed by Ascoli.

=== Return to Salernitana ===
On 16 August 2017 Salernitana signed Gatto on a three-year contract.

=== Entella ===
On 10 January 2018 Gatto was signed by Entella.

==== Pro Vercelli ====
On 24 August 2018 he joined Pro Vercelli on loan.

=== Triestina ===
On 8 August 2019 he joined Triestina on loan with an obligation to buy.

==== Return to Pro Vercelli ====
On 7 January 2021 he returned to Pro Vercelli on another loan.

== International career ==
Gatto received a U17 call-up in March 2009 He did not enter the final squad for elite qualification nor final tournament. In 2011, he received call-up twice from Italy national under-20 football team. The latter was act as a replacement of Manuel Giandonato.

In the 2012–13 season, Gatto, now an employee of a Lega Pro club, received call-up from Italy U20 Lega Pro team, the feeder team of U21 and dedicated to Lega Pro player (temporary deal excluded). He played the match against Croatia (twice), Russia and Oman. He also played in the unofficial friendly against ACF Fiorentina reserve.
