= Port of Changsha =

Port of Changsha 长沙港
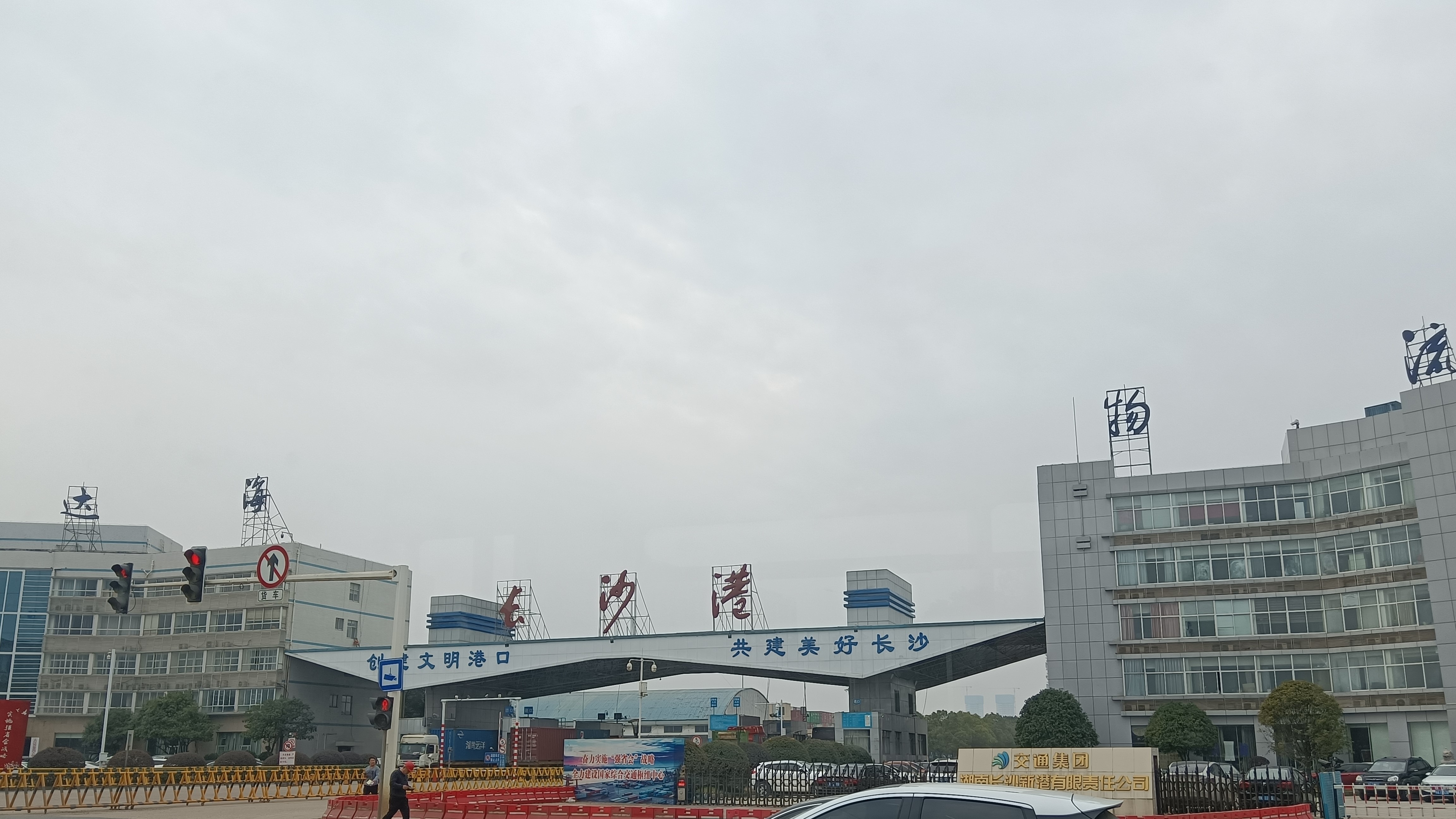
- Click on the map for a fullscreen view

Location
- Country: People's Republic of China
- Location: Changsha Hunan
- Coordinates: 28.3209391°N 112.9273603°E
- UN/LOCODE: CNCSH

Details
- Operated by: Hunan Changsha New Port Co., Ltd.
- No. of berths: 12
- Ro-Ro Terminal: 1
- Scope of Carrier: Container、Ore、Grain、Steel、Automobile

Statistics
- Annual cargo tonnage: 12.22 million (2022)
- Annual container volume: 205,919TEU（2022）
- Website http://www.portchangsha.com

Port of Changsha is one of the 36 major inland ports in China. It is the largest single-port area in terms of throughput in the entire province. It functions as a hub port integrating the handling of import and export containers, bulk cargo, rolling cargo, general cargo loading and unloading, and transportation.

The Xianing Port Area of Changsha Port is located in the northern part of the Kaifu District, on the east bank of the middle and lower reaches of the Xiang River. To the east, it is adjacent to the north–south Beijing-Guangzhou Railway and to the south, it relies on the east–west-oriented Shimen–Changsha railway, next to Changshabei Railway Station, with railway lines planned to enter the port. The road network is connected to the Jinggangao Expressway, the Hukun Expressway, and National Highway 107. It provides direct access to Changsha Huanghua International Airport, forming a three-dimensional transportation network integrating rail, road, water, and air.

== History ==
During the Spring and Autumn period and the Warring States period, Changsha began constructing a port city at Sanchaji, located on the western bank of the present-day Xiang River. This is what later generations referred to as the "Ancient Beijin City."

During the Tang Dynasty, Changsha became one of the four major rice markets in China, and the Port of Changsha played a crucial role in this economic activity.

During the Qing Dynasty, the population of Changsha city experienced significant growth, and the number of port docks increased from 9 to 27.

In 1904, the Port of Changsha was opened as a commercial port, and a steady stream of merchant ships came and went.

In 1995, the Ministry of Transport designated Changsha Port as one of the 23 main hub ports for inland waterways in China.

In 1997, the People's Government of Changsha City selected the location in Xianing to establish the main hub port of Changsha Port.

In July 2003, the first phase of Changsha New Port, primarily focused on container operations, was completed.

In September 2006, the second phase of Changsha New Port, with a focus on general cargo and dry bulk cargo, was put into operation.

== Data ==
Port of Changsha statistics
Year	Cargo Throughput (million tonnes)	Container Throughput (TEUs)	Total (million tonnes)	Year-on-Year
2015	2.27	121000	4.69	33%▲
2016	2.95	121000	5.37	14%▲
2017	3.91	148000	6.88	28%▲
2018	4.81	164000	8.09	18%▲
2019	6.29	165291	9.60	18.6%▲
2020	8.25	145025	11.15	18.43%▲
2021	10.50	200000	14.50	29.9%▲
2022	8.10	205919	12.22	14.61%▼
