= List of highways numbered 108 =

Route 108 or Highway 108 can refer to multiple roads:

== Canada ==
- New Brunswick Route 108
- Ontario Highway 108
- Prince Edward Island Route 108
- Quebec Route 108

== China ==
- China National Highway 108

== Costa Rica ==
- National Route 108

== India ==
- National Highway 108 (India)

== Japan ==
- Route 108 (Japan)

== Nigeria ==
- F108 highway (Nigeria)

== Philippines ==
- N108 highway (Philippines)

== United Kingdom ==
- B108 road

== United States ==
- Alabama State Route 108
  - County Route 108 (Lee County, Alabama)
- Arkansas Highway 108
- California State Route 108
- Connecticut Route 108
- Florida State Road 108 (pre-1945) (former)
- Georgia State Route 108
- Illinois Route 108
- Iowa Highway 108 (former)
- K-108 (Kansas highway) (former)
- Kentucky Route 108
- Louisiana Highway 108
- Maine State Route 108
- Maryland Route 108
  - Maryland Route 108A
  - Maryland Route 108H
- Massachusetts Route 108
- M-108 (Michigan highway) (former)
- Minnesota State Highway 108
- Missouri Route 108
- Nebraska Highway 108 (former)
- New Hampshire Route 108
- County Route 108 (Bergen County, New Jersey)
- New Mexico State Road 108
- New York State Route 108
  - County Route 108 (Cayuga County, New York)
  - County Route 108A (Cortland County, New York)
    - County Route 108B (Cortland County, New York)
  - County Route 108 (Fulton County, New York)
  - County Route 108 (Montgomery County, New York)
  - County Route 108 (Niagara County, New York)
  - County Route 108 (Onondaga County, New York)
  - County Route 108 (Rockland County, New York)
  - County Route 108 (Saratoga County, New York)
  - County Route 108 (Seneca County, New York)
  - County Route 108 (Suffolk County, New York)
  - County Route 108 (Sullivan County, New York)
  - County Route 108 (Wayne County, New York)
  - County Route 108 (Westchester County, New York)
- North Carolina Highway 108
- Ohio State Route 108
- Oklahoma State Highway 108
- Pennsylvania Route 108
- Rhode Island Route 108
- Tennessee State Route 108
- Texas State Highway 108
  - Texas State Highway Loop 108
  - Texas State Highway Spur 108
    - Texas State Highway Spur 108 (1940–1942) (former)
  - Farm to Market Road 108
- Utah State Route 108
- Vermont Route 108
- Virginia State Route 108
  - Virginia State Route 108 (1923-1928) (former)
  - Virginia State Route 108 (1928-1932) (former)
- Washington State Route 108
- West Virginia Route 108
- Wisconsin Highway 108

Territories

- Puerto Rico Highway 108
- U.S. Virgin Islands Highway 108

== See also ==
- 108 (number)
- A108 road (Great Britain)
- B108 road
- D108 road (Croatia)
- P108
- R108 road (Ireland)

Preceded by 107	Lists of highways 108	Succeeded by 109
