= Interstate 105 =

Interstate 105 may refer to either any of three unconnected Interstate Highways in the United States, each of which is or was related to Interstate 5:

- Interstate 105 (California), a spur of Interstate 5 in Los Angeles County, California
- Interstate 105 (California 1964–1968), a former part of U.S. Route 101 in downtown Los Angeles, California
- Interstate 105 (Oregon), a spur of Interstate 5 in Eugene, Oregon
- Interstate 105 (Washington), a cancelled auxiliary designation for Washington State Route 512 in Washington
