= List of highways numbered 107 =

Route 107 or Highway 107 can refer to multiple roads:

== Canada ==
- New Brunswick Route 107
- Nova Scotia Highway 107
- Prince Edward Island Route 107
- Quebec Route 107

== China ==
- China National Highway 107

== Costa Rica ==
- National Route 107

== India ==
- National Highway 107 (India)

== Japan ==
- Route 107 (Japan)

== Nigeria ==
- F107 highway (Nigeria)

== Philippines ==
- N107 highway (Philippines)

== United Kingdom ==
- A107 The A107 road in London

== United States ==
- Alabama State Route 107
- Arkansas Highway 107
- California State Route 107
- Connecticut Route 107
- Florida State Road 107 (pre-1945) (former)
- Georgia State Route 107
- Illinois Route 107
- Indiana State Road 107 (former)
- Iowa Highway 107
- K-107 (Kansas highway) (former)
- Kentucky Route 107
- Louisiana Highway 107
- Maine State Route 107
- Maryland Route 107
- Massachusetts Route 107
- M-107 (Michigan highway)
- Minnesota State Highway 107
- Missouri Route 107
- Nebraska Highway 107 (former)
- New Hampshire Route 107
  - New Hampshire Route 107A
- County Route 107 (Ocean County, New Jersey)
- New Mexico State Road 107
- New York State Route 107
  - County Route 107 (Fulton County, New York)
  - County Route 107 (Nassau County, New York)
  - County Route 107 (Onondaga County, New York)
  - County Route 107 (Orange County, New York)
  - County Route 107 (Seneca County, New York)
  - County Route 107 (Steuben County, New York)
  - County Route 107 (Suffolk County, New York)
  - County Route 107 (Tompkins County, New York)
    - County Route 107A (Tompkins County, New York)
- North Carolina Highway 107
- Ohio State Route 107
- Oklahoma State Highway 107 (1956–1961) (former)
  - Oklahoma State Highway 107 (1972–1981) (former)
  - Oklahoma State Highway 107 (1995–2000) (former)
- Pennsylvania Route 107
- Rhode Island Route 107
- South Carolina Highway 107
- Tennessee State Route 107
- Texas State Highway 107
  - Texas State Highway Loop 107
  - Texas State Highway Spur 107 (former)
  - Farm to Market Road 107
- Utah State Route 107
- Vermont Route 107
- Virginia State Route 107
  - Virginia State Route 107 (1923-1928) (former)
  - Virginia State Route 107 (1928-1933) (former)
  - Virginia State Route 107 (1933-1953) (former)
- Washington State Route 107
- West Virginia Route 107
- Wisconsin Highway 107

Territories

- Puerto Rico Highway 107
- U.S. Virgin Islands Highway 107

== See also ==
- D107 road (Croatia)
- P107
- R107 road (Ireland)

Preceded by 106	Lists of highways 107	Succeeded by 108
