= Marconia =

Marconia di Pisticci
- Comune
- Comune di Marconia di Pisticci
- Location within Italy Location within Basilicata
- Coordinates: 40°21′49″N 16°41′23″E
- Country: Italy
- Region: Basilicata
- Province: Matera (MT)
- Elevation: 106 m (348 ft)

Population (2001)
  - Total: ~ 13,000
- Demonym: Marconesi
- Time zone: UTC+1 (CET)
  - Summer (DST): UTC+2 (CEST)
- Postal code: 75015
- Dialing code: 0835
- Patron saint: Madonna delle Grazie
- Saint day: Second sunday of September
- Website: Official website

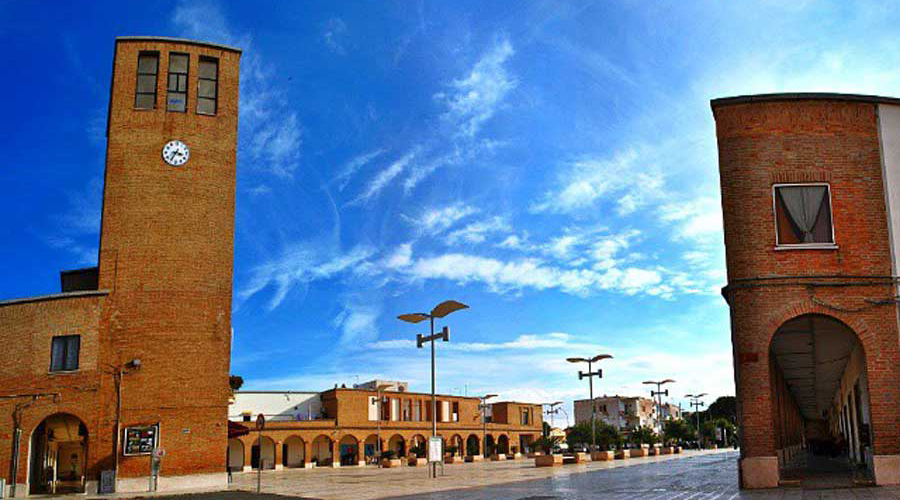
Electra Square in Marconia

Marconia is the main hamlet of the municipality of Pisticci in the Italian province of Matera. It is only 10 km from the Ionian coast of the same municipality and together with the peripheral urban agglomerations of Tinchi, Centro Agricolo, Casinello and the coastal area has approximately 13,000 inhabitants. Marconia is the newest and most populous town in the municipality of Pisticci and is located in a flat and central position in the Metapontino area.

Marconia was established during the Second World War as a fascist exile colony inhabited by political dissidents. After the dissolution of the colony, which occurred with the fall of fascism in Italy in 1943, some of the internees returned to their hometowns, others moved to Pisticci, but many decided to remain there.

Marconia is named for Guglielmo Marconi, an Italian 20th-century inventor credited with the invention of radio.
