= A106 =

A106 may refer to:

- Agusta A.106, a helicopter
- Alpine A106, a car
- A106 road
- A106 autoroute
- A106 (Atom: The Beginning), a character in the manga series Atom: The Beginning
