= Canna, Calabria =

Canna
- Comune
- Comune di Canna
- Location within Italy Location within Calabria
- Coordinates: 40°6′N 16°30′E
- Country: Italy
- Region: Calabria
- Province: Cosenza (CS)

Government
  - Mayor: Paolo Stigliano

Area
  - Total: 20.37 km^{2} (7.86 sq mi)
- Elevation: 417 m (1,368 ft)

Population (2007)
  - Total: 828
  - Density: 40.6/km^{2} (105/sq mi)
- Demonym: Cannesi
- Time zone: UTC+1 (CET)
  - Summer (DST): UTC+2 (CEST)
- Postal code: 87070
- Dialing code: 0981
- ISTAT code: 078024
- Patron saint: Madonna Immaculate
- Saint day: 8 December
- Website: Official website

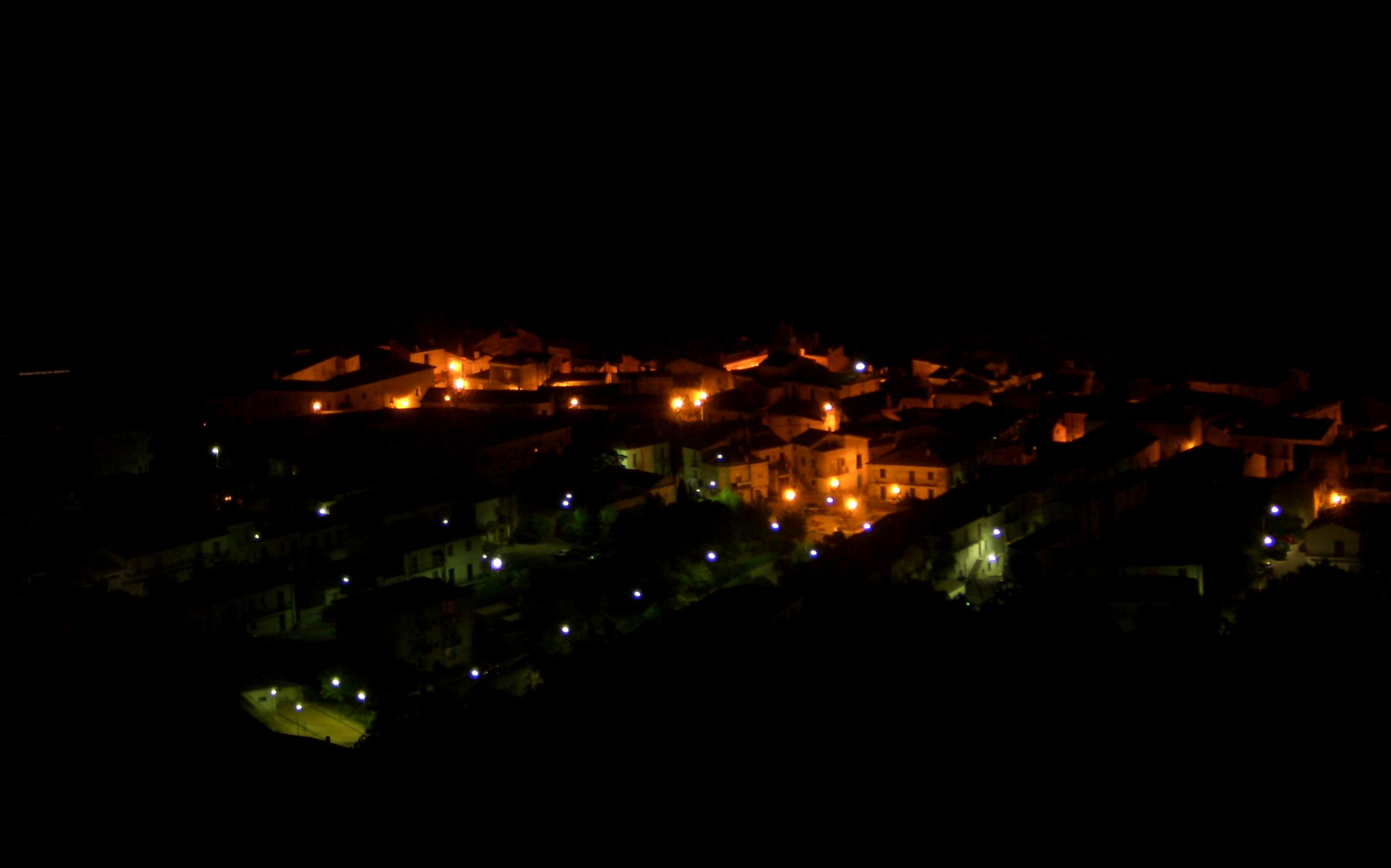
Canna, vista notturna sulla cittadina

Canna is a town and comune in the province of Cosenza in the Calabria region of southern Italy.
