= A105 =

A105 may refer to:

== Roads ==
- A105 road (England), a road in London connecting Canonbury and Enfield
- A105 motorway (France), a road near Combs-la-Ville
- Rublevo-Uspenskoe Shosse (route number A105 west of Moscow)

== Other uses ==
- AS-105, a 1965 spaceflight in the Apollo program
- Austin A105, a 1956 British car, in Austin's Westminster series
- RFA Easedale (A105), a 1941 Royal Fleet Auxiliary fleet tanker ship
- ASTM A105, a grade of carbon steel
