= A109 =

A109 may refer to:

- Agusta A109, the former designation of the AgustaWestland AW109, a helicopter model
- A109 road (England)
- A109 road (Kenya)
- RFA Abbeydale (A109) (1937–1959), a tanker of UK's Royal Navy
- RFA Bayleaf (A109) (1982–2011), a tanker of UK's Royal Navy
