= Villapiana =

Villapiana Greek: Leutermía
- Comune
- Comune di Villapiana
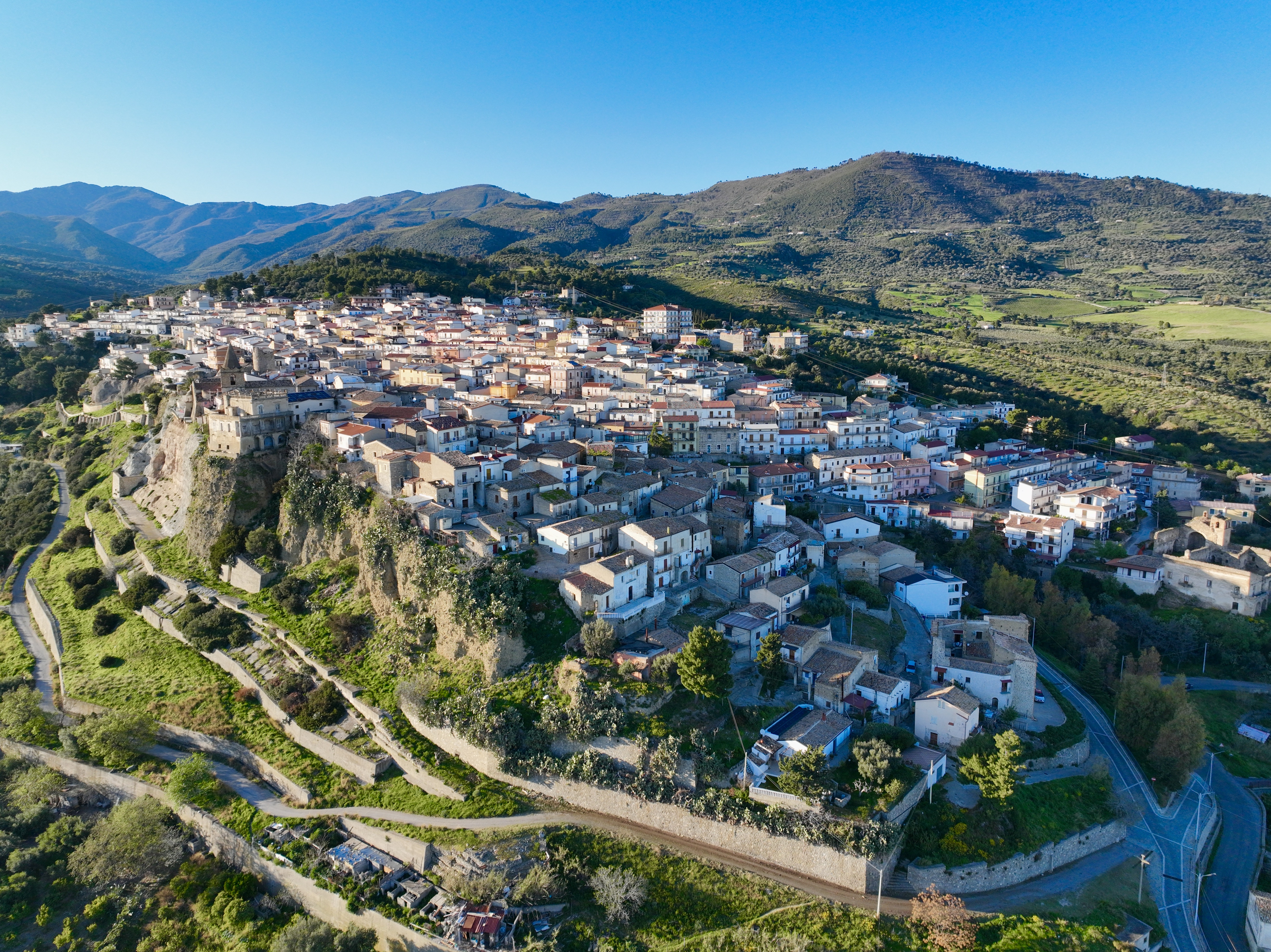
- Aerial view of Villapiana

- Villapiana within the Province of Cosenza

- Location within Italy Location within Calabria
- Coordinates: 39°51′N 16°27′E
- Country: Italy
- Region: Calabria
- Province: Cosenza (CS)
- Frazioni: Villapiana Lido, Villapiana Scalo

Government
  - Mayor: Vincenzo Ventimiglia

Area
  - Total: 39.73 km^{2} (15.34 sq mi)
- Elevation: 206 m (676 ft)

Population (February 2009)
  - Total: 5,371
  - Density: 135.2/km^{2} (350.1/sq mi)
- Demonym: Villapianesi
- Time zone: UTC+1 (CET)
  - Summer (DST): UTC+2 (CEST)
- Postal code: 87076
- Dialing code: 0981
- ISTAT code: 078154
- Patron saint: St. Francis of Paola
- Website: Official website

Villapiana (Calabrian: Villapiène) is a town and comune in the province of Cosenza in the Calabria region of southern Italy.

== History ==
Founded, as part of Magna Graecia, with the name of Lautermia, it was renamed Casalnuovo in the 14th century. On 4 January 1863 the town changed its toponym into the current one.

== Geography ==
Located in the northern corner of its province, close to the borders of Calabria with Basilicata, Villapiana borders with the municipalities of Cassano all'Ionio, Cerchiara di Calabria, Francavilla Marittima, Plataci and Trebisacce. The municipality includes the hamlets (frazioni) of Villapiana Lido and Villapiana Scalo, both by the Ionian Coast.

== Transport ==
The municipality, crossed by the Jonica railway, is served by two stations: Villapiana Lido in the homonym hamlet, and Villapiana-Torre Cerchiara in Villapiana Scalo. The coast is crossed by the state highway SS106 "Jonica", connecting Taranto with Reggio Calabria.
