= Rocca Imperiale =

- Comune
- Comune di Rocca Imperiale
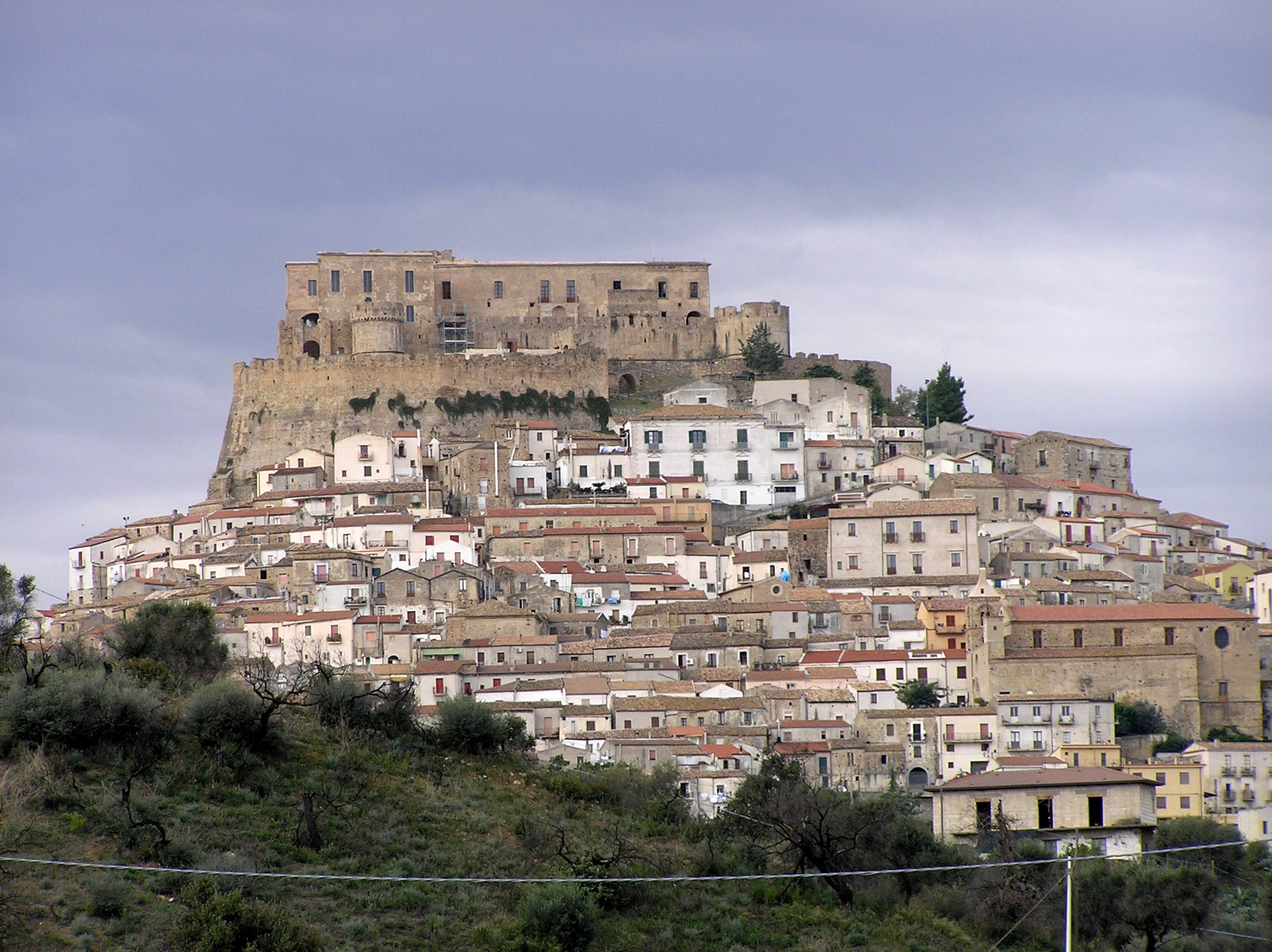
- The town with the Hohenstaufen castle at the top.

- Coat of arms

- Location within Italy Location within Calabria
- Coordinates: 40°7′N 16°35′E
- Country: Italy
- Region: Calabria
- Province: Cosenza (CS)
- Frazioni: Marina di Rocca Imperiale

Government
  - Mayor: Giuseppe Ranù

Area
  - Total: 55.03 km^{2} (21.25 sq mi)
- Elevation: 199 m (653 ft)

Population (30 September 2012)
  - Total: 3,306
  - Density: 60.08/km^{2} (155.6/sq mi)
- Demonym: Rocchesi
- Time zone: UTC+1 (CET)
  - Summer (DST): UTC+2 (CEST)
- Postal code: 87074
- Dialing code: 0981
- Patron saint: Madonna della Nova
- Saint day: 2 July
- Website: Official website

Rocca Imperiale is a town and comune in the province of Cosenza in the Calabria region of southern Italy. Rocca Imperiale is located in the middle of the arc that surrounds the Gulf of Taranto and sits 4 km away from the sea on a hill at the foothills of the Apennine Mountains, which stretches out to the shore that was once the ancient Siritide plain. It is one of I Borghi più belli d'Italia ("The most beautiful villages of Italy").

Main sights include the Castle of Frederick II of Hohenstaufen (Italian: Castello Svevo), Rocca Imperiale is the name of the town (meaning "imperial rock") the Chiesa Madre, the Monastery, and the wax museum.

== Twin towns – sister cities ==
Rocca Imperiale is twinned with:

- Valenza, Italy
