= Trebisacce =

- Comune
- Comune di Trebisacce
- Location within Italy Location within Calabria
- Coordinates: 39°52′N 16°32′E
- Country: Italy
- Region: Calabria
- Province: Cosenza (CS)
- Frazioni: Pagliara

Government
  - Mayor: Francesco Mundo

Area
  - Total: 26.72 km^{2} (10.32 sq mi)
- Elevation: 73 m (240 ft)

Population (2014)
  - Total: 9,046
  - Density: 338.5/km^{2} (876.8/sq mi)
- Demonym: Trebisaccesi
- Time zone: UTC+1 (CET)
  - Summer (DST): UTC+2 (CEST)
- Patron saint: Saint Leonard; Madonna del Rosario; Saint Rocco.
- Saint day: 6 November
- Website: Official website

Trebisacce is a town and comune in the province of Cosenza in the Calabria region of southern Italy. It is 92 km from the provincial capital of Cosenza, overlooking the Ionian Sea.

== Twin towns — sister cities ==
Trebisacce is twinned with:

- Mazara del Vallo, Italy
