= Laura Robson career statistics =

Career finals
Discipline	Type	Won	Lost	Total
Singles	Grand Slam	–	–	–
Singles	WTA Finals	–	–	–
Singles	Premier M/5	–	–	–
Singles	WTA Tour	–	1	1
Singles	Olympics	–	–	–
Singles	Total	–	1	1
Doubles	Grand Slam	–	–	–
Doubles	WTA Finals	–	–	–
Doubles	Premier M/5	–	1	1
Doubles	WTA Tour	–	1	1
Doubles	Olympics	–	–	–
Doubles	Total	–	2	2
Mixed	Grand Slam	–	–	–
Mixed	Olympics	–	1	1
Mixed	Total	–	1	1

This is a list of the main career statistics of professional British tennis player Laura Robson.

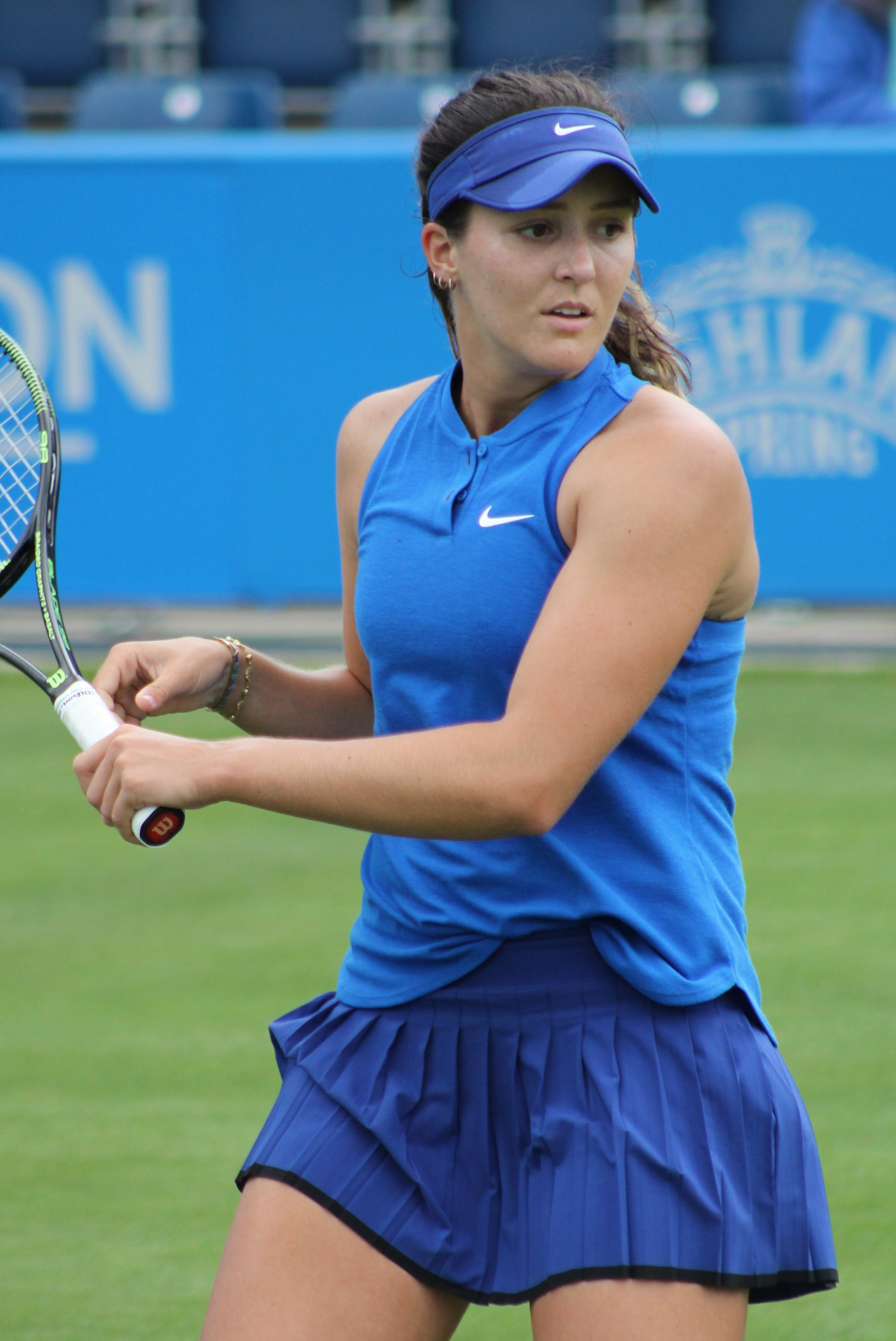
Robson at the 2016 Birmingham Classic.

== Career achievements ==
Laura Robson won her first Olympic medal at the 2012 Summer Olympics in mixed doubles alongside Andy Murray. At the 2012 US Open, she recorded the two biggest wins of her career over former Grand Slam champions Li Na and Kim Clijsters, before falling in the fourth round to Samantha Stosur. Robson reached her first WTA Tour singles final that same year in Guangzhou, losing to Hsieh Su-wei.

In 2013, Robson gained much praise by defeating Petra Kvitová in the second round Australian Open 11–9 in the deciding set, in a marathon match. At Madrid, Robson gained the first top four victory of her career, upsetting world No. 4, Agnieszka Radwańska, in the second round in straight sets, losing just four games. She subsequently lost to former world No. 1, Ana Ivanovic, in the following round, after having led 5–2 in the final set. At Wimbledon, she reached the fourth round as the home favorite, coming back from 1–6, 2–5 down to win her third-round match. At the US Open, Robson was seeded at a major event for the first time, at 30.

Over her career, Robson has claimed one ITF title. On the ITF Junior Circuit, she won the Wimbledon Championships in 2008 and finished runner-up at the Australian Open 2009 and 2010.

== Singles performance timeline ==
Key
W	F	SF	QF	#R	RR	Q#	P#	DNQ	A	Z#	PO	G	S	B	NMS	NTI	P	NH

(W) winner; (F) finalist; (SF) semifinalist; (QF) quarterfinalist; (#R) rounds 4, 3, 2, 1; (RR) round-robin stage; (Q#) qualification round; (P#) preliminary round; (DNQ) did not qualify; (A) absent; (Z#) Davis/Fed Cup Zonal Group (with number indication) or (PO) play-off; (G) gold, (S) silver or (B) bronze Olympic/Paralympic medal; (NMS) not a Masters tournament; (NTI) not a Tier I tournament; (P) postponed; (NH) not held; (SR) strike rate (events won / competed); (W–L) win–loss record.
To avoid confusion and double counting, these charts are updated at the conclusion of a tournament or when the player's participation has ended.

Only main-draw results in WTA Tour, Grand Slam tournaments, Fed Cup and Olympic Games are included in win–loss records.

Tournament	2009	2010	2011	2012	2013	2014	2015	2016	2017	2018	2019	SR	W–L	Win %
Grand Slam tournaments
Australian Open	A	Q2	A	1R	3R	1R	A	A	Q1	A	A	0 / 3	2–3	40%
French Open	A	A	A	1R	1R	A	A	1R	A	A	A	0 / 3	0–3	0%
Wimbledon	1R	1R	2R	1R	4R	A	1R	1R	1R	A	A	0 / 8	4–8	33%
US Open	Q3	Q3	2R	4R	3R	A	1R	1R	Q1	A	A	0 / 5	6–5	55%
Win–loss	0–1	0–1	2–2	3–4	7–4	0–1	0–2	0–3	0–1	0–0	0–0	0 / 19	12–19	38%
National representation
Summer Olympics	NH			2R	NH			A	NH			0 / 1	1–1	50%
Premier M & Premier 5
Dubai / Qatar Open (Note: The first Premier 5 event of the year has switched back and forth between the Dubai Tennis Championships and the Qatar Ladies Open since 2009. Dubai was classified as a Premier 5 event from 2009 to 2011 before being succeeded by Doha for the 2012–2014 period. In 2015, Dubai regained its Premier 5 status while Doha was demoted to Premier status. The Premier 5 tournaments were reclassified as WTA 1000 tournaments in 2021.)	A	A	A	Q1	1R	A	A	A	A	A	A	0 / 1	0–1	0%
Indian Wells Open	A	A	A	Q1	1R	A	A	1R	A	A	A	0 / 2	0–2	0%
Miami Open	A	A	A	Q2	2R	A	A	1R	A	A	A	0 / 2	1–2	33%
Madrid Open	A	A	A	A	3R	A	A	1R	A	A	A	0 / 2	2–2	50%
Italian Open	A	A	A	A	2R	A	A	Q1	A	A	A	0 / 1	1–1	50%
Cincinnati Open	A	A	Q1	Q2	A	A	A	A	A	A	A		0–0	0%
China Open	A	A	1R	2R	2R	A	A	A	A	A	A		2–3	40%
Career statistics
Titles	0	0	0	0	0	0	0	0	0	0	0	Career total: 0		
Finals	0	0	0	1	0	0	0	0	0	0	0	Career total: 1		
Year-end ranking	419	206	131	53	46	951	558	219	251	435	—			

== Olympic finals ==
=== Mixed doubles: 1 (silver medal) ===
Result	Year	Location	Surface	Partner	Opponents	Score
Silver	2012	Summer Olympics, London	Grass	(United Kingdom) Andy Murray	(Belarus) Max Mirnyi (Belarus) Victoria Azarenka	6–2, 3–6, [8–10]

== WTA Tour finals ==
=== Singles: 1 (runner-up) ===
Legend Grand Slam tournaments Premier M & Premier 5 Premier International (0–1)	Finals by surface Hard (0–1) Grass (0–0) Clay (0–0) Carpet (0–0)

Result	W–L	Date	Tournament	Tier	Surface	Opponent	Score
Loss	0–1	Sep 2012	Guangzhou Open, China	International	Hard	(Chinese Taipei) Hsieh Su-wei	3–6, 7–5, 4–6

=== Doubles: 2 (2 runner-ups) ===
Legend Grand Slam tournaments Premier M & Premier 5 (0–1) Premier (0–0) International (0–1)	Finals by surface Hard (0–1) Grass (0–1) Clay (0–0) Carpet (0–0)

Result	W–L	Date	Tournament	Tier	Surface	Partner	Opponent	Score
Loss	0–1	Mar 2013	Miami Open, United States	Premier M	Hard	(United States) Lisa Raymond	(Russia) Nadia Petrova (Slovenia) Katarina Srebotnik	1–6, 6–7^{(2–7)}
Loss	0–2	Jun 2017	Nottingham Open, United Kingdom	International	Grass	(United Kingdom) Jocelyn Rae	(Australia) Monique Adamczak (Australia) Storm Sanders	4–6, 6–4, [4–10]

== ITF Circuit finals ==
=== Singles: 4 (3 titles, 1 runner–up) ===
Legend $100,000 tournaments $60,000 tournaments $25,000 tournaments $10,000 tournaments	Finals by surface Hard (2–1) Clay (0–0) Grass (0–0) Carpet (1–0)

Result	W–L	Date	Tournament	Tier	Surface	Opponent	Score
Win	1–0	Nov 2008	ITF Sunderland, United Kingdom	10,000	Hard	(United Kingdom) Samantha Vickers	6–3, 6–2
Loss	1–1	Jul 2011	ITF Woking, United Kingdom	25,000	Hard	(Australia) Johanna Konta	4–6, 1–1 ret.
Win	2–1	Aug 2016	ITF Landisville, United States	25,000	Hard	(United States) Julia Elbaba	6–0, 6–0
Win	3–1	May 2017	Kurume Cup, Japan	60,000	Carpet	(United Kingdom) Katie Boulter	6–3, 6–4

=== Doubles: 9 (4 titles, 5 runner–ups) ===
Legend $75,000 tournaments $50/60,000 tournaments $25,000 tournaments	Finals by surface Hard (4–4) Clay (0–0) Grass (0–1)

Result	W–L	Date	Tournament	Tier	Surface	Partner	Opponents	Score
Loss	0–1	Jun 2012	Nottingham Trophy, UK	75,000	Grass	(United Kingdom) Heather Watson	(Greece) Eleni Daniilidou (Australia) Casey Dellacqua	4–6, 2–6
Loss	0–2	Jul 2015	Challenger de Granby, Canada	50,000	Hard	(Canada) Erin Routliffe	(Australia) Jessica Moore (Australia) Storm Sanders	5–7, 2–6
Win	1–2	Aug 2016	ITF Landisville, United States	25,000	Hard	(United Kingdom) Freya Christie	(Belgium) Elise Mertens (Belgium) An-Sophie Mestach	6–3, 6–4
Loss	1–3	Apr 2017	ITF Istanbul, Turkey	25,000	Hard	(United Kingdom) Freya Christie	(Russia) Olga Doroshina (Russia) Polina Monova	3–6, 2–6
Win	2–3	Sep 2017	Las Vegas Open, United States	60,000	Hard	(Belgium) An-Sophie Mestach	(United States) Sophie Chang (United States) Alexandra Mueller	7–6^{(9–7)}, 7–6^{(7–2)}
Loss	2–4	Oct 2017	Liuzhou Open, China	60,000	Hard	(United States) Jacqueline Cako	(China) Han Xinyun (Japan) Makoto Ninomiya	2–6, 6–7^{(3–7)}
Win	3–4	Feb 2018	Burnie International, Australia	60,000	Hard	(United States) Vania King	(Japan) Momoko Kobori (Japan) Chihiro Muramatsu	7–6^{(7–3)}, 6–1
Loss	3–5	Feb 2018	Launceston International, Australia	25,000	Hard	(Russia) Valeria Savinykh	(Australia) Jessica Moore (Australia) Ellen Perez	6–7^{(5–7)}, 4–6
Win	4–5	Mar 2018	ITF Yokohama, Japan	25,000	Hard	(Hungary) Fanny Stollár	(Japan) Momoko Kobori (Japan) Chihiro Muramatsu	5–7, 6–1, [10–4]

== ITF Junior finals ==
=== Grand Slam tournaments ===
==== Singles: 3 (1 title, 2 runner-ups) ====
Result	Year	Tournament	Surface	Opponent	Score
Win	2008	Wimbledon	Grass	(Thailand) Noppawan Lertcheewakarn	6–3, 3–6, 6–1
Loss	2009	Australian Open	Hard	(Russia) Ksenia Pervak	3–6, 1–6
Loss	2010	Australian Open	Hard	(Czech Republic) Karolína Plíšková	1–6, 6–7^{(5–7)}

== Fed Cup participation ==
Great Britain Fed Cup team

=== Singles (4–2) ===
Edition	Round	Date	Location	Against	Surface	Opponent	W/L	Score
2012 Fed Cup	WG II PO	Apr 2012	Borås (SWE)	Sweden	Hard (i)	Sofia Arvidsson	L	4–6, 6–1, 3–6
2013 Fed Cup	ZG I RR	Feb 2013	Eilat (ISR)	Portugal	Hard	Margarida Moura	W	6–2, 6–1
2013 Fed Cup	ZG I RR	Feb 2013	Eilat (ISR)	Hungary	Hard	Gréta Arn	W	0–6, 6–2, 6–1
2013 Fed Cup	ZG I PO	Feb 2013	Eilat (ISR)	Bulgaria	Hard	Dia Evtimova	W	6–0, 6–4
2013 Fed Cup	WG II PO	Apr 2013	Buenos Aires (ARG)	Argentina	Clay	Florencia Molinero	W	6–1, 6–1
2013 Fed Cup	WG II PO	Apr 2013	Buenos Aires (ARG)	Argentina	Clay	Paula Ormaechea	L	4–6, 6–4, 2–6

=== Doubles (9–1) ===
Edition	Round	Date	Location	Against	Surface	Partner	Opponents	W/L	Score
2012 Fed Cup	ZG I RR	Feb 2012	Eilat (ISR)	Portugal	Hard	Heather Watson	Maria João Koehler; Michelle Larcher de Brito	W	7–5, 6–0
2012 Fed Cup	ZG I RR	Feb 2012	Eilat (ISR)	Netherlands	Hard	Heather Watson	Kiki Bertens; Bibiane Schoofs	W	7–5, 7–6^{(7–5)}
2012 Fed Cup	ZG I RR	Feb 2012	Eilat (ISR)	Israel	Hard	Heather Watson	Julia Glushko; Keren Shlomo	W	6–2, 6–1
2013 Fed Cup	ZG I RR	Feb 2013	Eilat (ISR)	Bosnia and Herzegovina	Hard	Johanna Konta	Jasmina Kajtazovič; Jelena Simić	W	6–0, 6–0
2013 Fed Cup	ZG I RR	Feb 2013	Eilat (ISR)	Portugal	Hard	Heather Watson	Michelle Larcher de Brito; Joana Valle Costa	W	6–2, 6–1
2013 Fed Cup	ZG I RR	Feb 2013	Eilat (ISR)	Hungary	Hard	Johanna Konta	Tímea Babos; Katalin Marosi	L	4–6, 6–2, 2–6
2017 Fed Cup	ZG I RR	Feb 2017	Tallinn (EST)	Portugal	Hard (i)	Jocelyn Rae	Michelle Larcher de Brito; Inês Murta	W	6–2, 6–3
2017 Fed Cup	ZG I RR	Feb 2017	Tallinn (EST)	Latvia	Hard (i)	Jocelyn Rae	Diāna Marcinkēviča; Daniela Vismane	W	6–0, 6–7^{(2–7)}, 6–2
2017 Fed Cup	ZG I RR	Feb 2017	Tallinn (EST)	Turkey	Hard (i)	Jocelyn Rae	Ayla Aksu; Pemra Özgen	W	6–2, 6–2
2017 Fed Cup	WG II PO	Apr 2017	Constanța (ROU)	Romania	Clay	Jocelyn Rae	Simona Halep; Monica Niculescu	W	6–3, 1–6, [10–8]

== Top-10 wins per season ==
#	Player	Rank	Event	Surface	Rd	Score
2012
1.	(China) Li Na	No. 8	US Open	Hard	3R	6–4, 6–7^{(5–7)}, 6–2
2013
2.	(Czech Republic) Petra Kvitová	No. 8	Australian Open	Hard	2R	2–6, 6–3, 11–9
3.	(Poland) Agnieszka Radwańska	No. 4	Madrid Open	Clay	2R	6–3, 6–1
4.	(Russia) Maria Kirilenko	No. 10	Wimbledon	Grass	1R	6–3, 6–4

== See also ==
- List of Grand Slam Women's Singles champions
- WTA Tour records
