= Portuguese Tennis Federation =

Federeção Portuguesa de Ténis
- Sport: Tennis
- Abbreviation: (FPT)
- Founded: 1925
- Affiliation: International Tennis Federation
- Location: Lisbon
- President: Vasco Costa

Official website
- www.tenis.pt
- (Portugal)

The Portuguese Tennis Federation (Portuguese: Federação Portuguesa de Ténis, FPT) is the national governing body for tennis in Portugal founded in 1925. It is a member of the regional association Tennis Europe and the International Tennis Federation (ITF) and is responsible for the Portugal Davis Cup team and the Portugal Fed Cup team. FPT regulates tennis, padel tennis, wheelchair tennis and beach tennis professional and amateur activities in Portugal, including National Championships.

== Organization ==
The FPT has 13 geographical associations, with more than 300 clubs, and 3 professional associations representing coaches, players and officials.

- Tennis Officials Association
- Portugal Tennis Players Association
- Portuguese Association for Tennis Coaches
- Azores Tennis Association
- Alentejo Tennis Association
- Algarve Tennis Association
- Aveiro Tennis Association
- Castelo Branco Tennis Association
- Coimbra Tennis Association
- Leiria Tennis Association
- Lisbon Tennis Association
- Madeira Tennis Association
- Porto Tennis Association
- Setúbal Tennis Association
- Vila Real Tennis Association
- Viseu Tennis Association

== History ==
Without an organization to support a participation at the Davis Cup, a group of players met at Automóvel Club de Portugal headquarters in 1924 to solve the situation. In result, the Lawn Tennis Portuguese Federation was founded on 16 March 1925, with Guilherme Pinto Basto serving as its first President. The first Portuguese Davis Cup team would play later that year. However, it would not be until 1963 under President Herédia that Portugal would have a regular representation at the competition.

== Tournaments ==
- Estoril Open (2015–)
- Lisbon Open (1983)
- Oporto Open (1995–1996)
- Porto Open (2001–2002)
- Portugal Open (1990–2014)
- 2000 Tennis Masters Cup

=== National Championships ===
The Portuguese Tennis National Championships were first held in 1925 and have been organized ever since by FPT. Under the official name "Campeonato Nacional Absoluto/Taça Guilherme Pinto Basto", the 2014 and 2015 editions were held at CIF – Clube Internacional de Foot-Ball, in Lisbon.

The following list presents Portuguese champions for Singles, Doubles and Mixed tennis competitions. (Note: See)

Year	Men's singles	Women's singles	Men's doubles	Women's doubles	Mixed doubles
1925	Frederico D'Orey	Angélica Plantier (1/8)	António Casanovas (1/7); Frederico de Vasconcelos (1/5)	no competition	Angélica Plantier (1/5); Frederico de Vasconcelos (1/5)
1926	no competition	Angélica Plantier (2/8)	António Casanovas (2/7); Frederico de Vasconcelos (2/5)	no competition	Angélica Plantier (2/5); Frederico de Vasconcelos (2/5)
1927	Frederico Ribeiro	Angélica Plantier (3/8)	António Casanovas (3/7); Frederico de Vasconcelos (3/5)	no competition	no competition
1928	no competition	no competition	António Casanovas (4/7); Frederico de Vasconcelos (4/5)	no competition	no competition
1929	José de Verda (1/2)	Angélica Plantier (4/8)	José de Verda (1/2); A. Pinto Coelho (1/3)	no competition	Angélica Plantier (3/5); Frederico de Vasconcelos (3/5)
1930	José de Verda (2/2)	M. F. Borges	José de Verda (2/2); A. Pinto Coelho (2/3)	Gabriela Catarino (1/2); M. Teresa Cunha (1/2)	Gabriela Catarino (1/4); Frederico de Vasconcelos (4/5)
1931	Rodrigo de Castro Pereira	Angélica Plantier (5/8)	António Casanovas (5/7); Frederico de Vasconcelos (5/5)	no competition	Angélica Plantier (4/5); Frederico de Vasconcelos (5/5)
1932	António Casanovas	Angélica Plantier (6/8)	António Casanovas (6/7); José Roquette (1/14)	no competition	Angélica Plantier (5/5); Luís Ricciardi
1933	Domingos D'Avillez (1/2)	Angélica Plantier (7/8)	António Casanovas (7/7); Rodrigo de Castro Pereira	no competition	M. Teresa Cunha; A. Pinto Coelho
1934	José Roquette (1/14)	Miss Westray	Frederico Ribeiro; A. Pinto Coelho (3/3)	Gabriela Catarino (2/2); M. Teresa Cunha (2/2)	Viola Bajan; Joaquim Serra e Moura (1/2)
1935	José Roquette (2/14)	Angélica Plantier (8/8)	Joaquim Serra e Moura; Nuno de Castro Pereira	no competition	Gabriela Catarino (2/4); Joaquim Serra e Moura (2/2)
1936	José Roquette (3/14)	no competition	José Roquette (2/14); Eduardo Ricciardi (1/10)	no competition	no competition
1937	Domingos D'Avillez (2/2)	Gabriela Catarino	Domingos D'Avillez; Eduardo Ricciardi (2/10)	no competition	no competition
1938	José Roquette (4/14)	Miss Talt	José Roquette (3/14); Luís Megre	no competition	no competition
1939	Eduardo Ricciardi (1/4)	no competition	Vasco Horta e Costa (1/2); Alberto Matos	no competition	no competition
1940	José Roquette (5/14)	no competition	José Roquette (4/14); Eduardo Ricciardi (3/10)	Mrs. Graham; Mrs. Talt	Miss Wall; F. D'Almeida
1941	Eduardo Ricciardi (2/4)	no competition	José Roquette (5/14); Eduardo Ricciardi (4/10)	no competition	no competition
1942	José Roquette (6/14)	no competition	José Roquette (6/14); Eduardo Ricciardi (5/10)	no competition	no competition
1943	José Roquette (7/14)	no competition	Eduardo Ricciardi (6/10); António Boter (1/2)	no competition	no competition
1944	José Roquette (8/14)	no competition	José Roquette (7/14); António Boter (2/2)	no competition	Gabriela Catarino (3/4); José Roquette (1/4)
1945	José Roquette (9/14)	Peggy Brixhe (1/8)	José Roquette (8/14); Eduardo Ricciardi (7/10)	no competition	Gabriela Catarino (4/4); José Roquette (2/4)
1946	Eduardo Ricciardi (3/4)	Peggy Brixhe (2/8)	José Roquette (9/14); Eduardo Ricciardi (8/10)	no competition	no competition
1947	Vasco Horta e Costa	Peggy Brixhe (3/8)	José Roquette (10/14); Eduardo Ricciardi (9/10)	no competition	no competition
1948	Eduardo Ricciardi (4/4)	no competition	José Roquette (11/14); Eduardo Ricciardi (10/10)	no competition	J.C. Hoeizer; José Roquette (3/4)
1949	José Roquette (10/14)	Peggy Brixhe (4/8)	José Silva (1/4); Manuel Silva	no competition	no competition
1950	José Roquette (11/14)	no competition	Francisco Matos; Manuel Nicolau de Almeida	no competition	no competition
1951	José Roquette (12/14)	no competition	José Roquette (12/14); António Azevedo Gomes (1/7)	no competition	Peggy Brixhe (1/5); António Azevedo Gomes (1/3)
1952	José Roquette (13/14)	no competition	José Roquette (13/14); Vasco Horta e Costa (2/2)	no competition	Peggy Brixhe (2/5); António Azevedo Gomes (2/3)
1953	José Roquette (14/14)	Maria Silva Araújo (1/2)	José Roquette (14/14); José Silva (2/4)	no competition	Maria Silva Araújo (1/2); Manuel Silva
1954	Carlos Figueira (1/3)	Maria Silva Araújo (2/2)	David Cohen (1/5); António Azevedo Gomes (2/7)	no competition	Maria Silva Araújo (2/2); José Caetano
1955	Carlos Figueira (2/3)	Peggy Brixhe (5/8)	David Cohen (2/5); António Azevedo Gomes (3/7)	no competition	no competition
1956	Manuel Dinis (1/2)	no competition	David Cohen (3/5); António Azevedo Gomes (4/7)	no competition	no competition
1957	Manuel Dinis (2/2)	no competition	Manuel Dinis (1/4); José Silva (3/4)	no competition	M. J. Graça; Carlos Figueira
1958	José Silva	no competition	José Silva (4/4); António Azevedo Gomes (5/7)	no competition	no competition
1959	David Cohen	no competition	David Cohen (4/5); António Azevedo Gomes (6/7)	no competition	no competition
1960	Carlos Figueira (3/3)	no competition	Manuel Dinis (2/4); M. Vinhas (1/2)	no competition	no competition
1961	António Azevedo Gomes	Peggy Brixhe (6/8)	Manuel Dinis (3/4); M. Vinhas (2/2)	no competition	Peggy Brixhe (3/5); António Azevedo Gomes (3/3)
1962	Prata Dias	no competition	Manuel Dinis (4/4); João Caetano	no competition	no competition
1963	Alfredo Vaz Pinto (1/7)	no competition	Alfredo Vaz Pinto (1/6); João Roquette (1/6)	no competition	no competition
1964	Alfredo Vaz Pinto (2/7)	no competition	David Cohen (5/5); António Azevedo Gomes (7/7)	no competition	no competition
1965	João Lagos (1/3)	Peggy Brixhe (7/8)	Alfredo Vaz Pinto (2/6); João Roquette (2/6)	no competition	Peggy Brixhe (4/5); P. Vasconcelos
1966	João Lagos (2/3)	Peggy Brixhe (8/8)	Alfredo Vaz Pinto (3/6); João Roquette (3/6)	no competition	no competition
1967	João Lagos (3/3)	Leonor Santos (1/13)	Alfredo Vaz Pinto (4/6); João Roquette (4/6)	no competition	Maria do Carmo Arnoso; David Cohen
1968	Alfredo Vaz Pinto (3/7)	Leonor Santos (2/13)	Alfredo Vaz Pinto (5/6); João Roquette (5/6)	no competition	Leonor Santos (1/3); Alfredo Vaz Pinto (1/3)
1969	Alfredo Vaz Pinto (4/7)	Leonor Santos (3/13)	Alfredo Vaz Pinto (6/6); João Roquette (6/6)	no competition	Peggy Brixhe (5/5); João Roquette
1970	Alfredo Vaz Pinto (5/7)	Leonor Santos (4/13)	José Vilela (1/8); João Lagos (1/8)	no competition	no competition
1971	Alfredo Vaz Pinto (6/7)	Leonor Santos (5/13)	José Vilela (2/8); João Lagos (2/8)	no competition	no competition
1972	Alfredo Vaz Pinto (7/7)	Leonor Santos (6/13)	José Vilela (3/8); João Lagos (3/8)	no competition	Leonor Santos (2/3); Alfredo Vaz Pinto (2/3)
1973	José Vilela (1/5)	Leonor Santos (7/13)	José Vilela (4/8); João Lagos (4/8)	no competition	no competition
1974	José Vilela (2/5)	Leonor Santos (8/13)	José Vilela (5/8); João Lagos (5/8)	no competition	no competition
1975	José Vilela (3/5)	Leonor Santos (9/13)	José Vilela (6/8); João Lagos (6/8)	no competition	no competition
1976	José Vilela (4/5)	Leonor Santos (10/13)	José Vilela (7/8); João Lagos (7/8)	no competition	M. Lencastre; José Vilela
1977	José Vilela (5/5)	Deborah Fiuza (1/3)	Manuel de Sousa (1/2); Miguel Soares (1/2)	no competition	Deborah Fiuza; José Roquette (4/4)
1978	Sérgio Cruz (1/2)	Deborah Fiuza (2/3)	José Vilela (8/8); João Lagos (8/8)	Leonor Santos; Conceição Posser	Leonor Santos (3/3); Alfredo Vaz Pinto (3/3)
1979	Miguel Soares (1/2)	Leonor Santos (11/13)	José Manuel Cordeiro (1/6); Pedro Cordeiro (1/8)	no competition	no competition
1980	Sérgio Cruz (2/2)	Leonor Santos (12/13)	José Manuel Cordeiro (2/6); Pedro Cordeiro (2/8)	no competition	no competition
1981	Miguel Soares (2/2)	Deborah Fiuza (3/3)	Miguel Soares (2/2); Luís Filipe Silva	no competition	no competition
1982	Pedro Cordeiro (1/4)	Leonor Santos (13/13)	José Manuel Cordeiro (3/6); Pedro Cordeiro (3/8)	Paula Abreu; Marta Varanda (1/2)	Fátima Santiago (1/3); José Maria Santiago (1/3)
1983	Pedro Cordeiro (2/4)	Fátima Santiago (1/2)	José Manuel Cordeiro (4/6); Pedro Cordeiro (4/8)	Graça Cardoso; Marta Varanda (2/2)	Fátima Santiago (2/3); José Maria Santiago (2/3)
1984	Pedro Cordeiro (3/4)	Fátima Santiago (2/2)	José Manuel Cordeiro (5/6); Pedro Cordeiro (5/8)	Susana Marques (1/2); Fátima Santiago	Fátima Santiago (3/3); Luís de Sousa (1/2)
1985	Pedro Cordeiro (4/4)	Susana Marques (1/2)	Nuno Marques (1/3); João Cunha e Silva (1/5)	Susana Marques (2/2); Susana Carvalho da Silva	Graça Cardoso; Manuel de Sousa (1/2)
1986	João Cunha e Silva (1/5)	Susana Marques (2/2)	José Manuel Cordeiro (6/6); Pedro Cordeiro (6/8)	Patrícia Valadas (1/2); Ana Rita Ascenso (1/2)	Susana Marques; Luís de Sousa (2/2)
1987	João Cunha e Silva (2/5)	Patrícia Valadas (1/2)	Manuel de Sousa (2/2); Bernardo Mota (1/7)	Patrícia Valadas (2/2); Ana Rita Ascenso (2/2)	Ana Rita Ascenso; Manuel de Sousa (2/2)
1988	João Cunha e Silva (3/5)	Patrícia Valadas (2/2)	Pedro Cordeiro (7/8); Alberto Miguel	Tânia Couto (1/3); Maria Rego	Joana Pedroso (1/2); Paulo Machado
1989	João Cunha e Silva (4/5)	Tânia Couto	Pedro Cordeiro (8/8); Pedro Carvalho Silva	no competition	Tânia Couto (1/4); Emanuel Couto (1/4)
1990	Nuno Marques (1/4)	Sofia Prazeres (1/9)	Emanuel Couto (1/3); Pedro Sousa	no competition	Tânia Couto (2/4); Emanuel Couto (2/4)
1991	João Cunha e Silva (5/5)	Sofia Prazeres (2/9)	Emanuel Couto (2/3); Bernardo Mota (2/7)	Elisabete Coelho; Eva Mendonça	Tânia Couto (3/4); Emanuel Couto (3/4)
1992	Nuno Marques (2/4)	Sofia Prazeres (3/9)	R. Silva; Vasco Gonçalves (1/2)	Tânia Couto (2/3); Sofia Prazeres (1/6)	Tânia Couto (4/4); Emanuel Couto (4/4)
1993	Emanuel Couto (1/4)	Sofia Prazeres (4/9)	Emanuel Couto (3/3); Bernardo Mota (3/7)	Tânia Couto (3/3); Sofia Prazeres (2/6)	Manuela Costa (1/4); André Mota (1/3)
1994	Emanuel Couto (2/4)	Sofia Prazeres (5/9)	Nuno Marques (2/3); João Cunha e Silva (2/5)	Sofia Prazeres (3/6); Joana Pedroso (1/3)	Joana Pedroso (2/2); José Maria Santiago (3/3)
1995	Emanuel Couto (3/4)	Sofia Prazeres (6/9)	Bernardo Mota (4/7); Vasco Gonçalves (2/2)	Sofia Prazeres (4/6); Joana Pedroso (2/3)	Manuela Costa (2/4); André Mota (2/3)
1996	Bruno Fragoso (1/2)	Sofia Prazeres (7/9)	Hélder Lopes; Israel Monteiro	Sofia Prazeres (5/6); Joana Pedroso (3/3)	Manuela Costa (3/4); João Couto
1997	Bernardo Mota (1/2)	Sofia Prazeres (8/9)	Bernardo Mota (5/7); Bruno Fragoso (1/2)	Cristina Correia (1/4); Angela Cardoso (1/4)	Manuela Costa (4/4); André Mota (3/3)
1998	Bruno Fragoso (2/2)	Sofia Prazeres (9/9)	João Cunha e Silva (3/5); Bruno Fragoso (2/2)	Sofia Prazeres (6/6); Ana Catarina Nogueira (1/3)	Carlota Santos (1/2); Hélder Carvalho (1/2)
1999	Nuno Marques (3/4)	Ana Catarina Nogueira (1/3)	Nuno Marques (3/3); João Cunha e Silva (4/5)	Cristina Correia (2/4); Angela Cardoso (2/4)	Carlota Santos (2/2); Hélder Carvalho (2/2)
2000	Emanuel Couto (4/4)	Ana Catarina Nogueira (2/3)	Bernardo Mota (6/7); João Cunha e Silva (5/5)	Cristina Correia (3/4); Angela Cardoso (3/4)	no competition
2001	Nuno Marques (4/4)	Frederica Piedade (1/2)	Diogo Rocha; Leonardo Tavares (1/3)	Cristina Correia (4/4); Angela Cardoso (4/4)	no competition
2002	Bernardo Mota (2/2)	Frederica Piedade (2/2)	Bernardo Mota (7/7); Leonardo Tavares (2/3)	no competition	no competition
2003	Leonardo Tavares	Neuza Silva (1/4)	Leonardo Tavares (3/3); Tiago Godinho (1/3)	no competition	Magali de Lattre; Edgar Campos
2004	Frederico Gil (1/3)	Ana Catarina Nogueira (3/3)	Tiago Godinho (2/3); Rui Machado	Magali de Lattre; Neuza Silva	Kátia Rodrigues; Hugo Anão
2005	Rui Machado (1/4)	Magali de Lattre	Hugo Anão (1/2); Tiago Godinho (3/3)	Kátia Rodrigues (1/2); Joana Pangaio (1/4)	Catarina Ferreira (1/4); João Ferreira (1/4)
2006	Frederico Gil (2/3)	Neuza Silva (2/4)	João Ferreira; José R. Nunes	Kátia Rodrigues (2/2); Joana Pangaio (2/4)	Catarina Ferreira (2/4); João Ferreira (2/4)
2007	Frederico Gil (3/3)	Neuza Silva (3/4)	Hugo Anão (2/2); Filipe Rebelo	Ana Catarina Nogueira (2/3); Joana Pangaio (3/4)	Catarina Ferreira (3/4); João Ferreira (3/4)
2008	Rui Machado (2/4)	Neuza Silva (4/4)	Gonçalo Falcão (1/2); Nuno Páscoa	Frederica Piedade; Ana Catarina Nogueira (3/3)	Catarina Ferreira (4/4); João Ferreira (4/4)
2009	Gonçalo Pereira	Maria João Koehler (1/5)	Vasco Pascoal; Martim Trueva	Maria João Koehler; Joana Pangaio (4/4)	Ana Claro (1/2); José Ricardo Nunes (1/3)
2010	Martim Trueva	Maria João Koehler (2/5)	Vasco Mensurado; Frederico Ferreira Silva	Patrícia Martins; Diana Batista	Ana Claro (2/2); José Ricardo Nunes (2/3)
2011	João Domingues (1/2)	Maria João Koehler (3/5)	Diogo Cabral; Gonçalo Pereira (1/4)	Bárbara Luz (1/3); Joana Valle Costa (1/2)	Bárbara Luz; José Ricardo Nunes (3/3)
2012	Vasco Mensurado	Maria João Koehler (4/5)	Gonçalo Falcão (2/2); Gonçalo Pereira (2/4)	no competition	Rita Vilaça (1/3); Ricardo Jorge
2013	Rui Machado (3/4)	Maria João Koehler (5/5)	João Domingues(1/2); Gonçalo Pereira (3/4)	Bárbara Luz (2/3); Joana Valle Costa (2/2)	Joana Valle Costa; Gonçalo Falcão
2014	Rui Machado (4/4)	Bárbara Luz (1/2)	João Domingues(2/2); Gonçalo Pereira (4/4)	Raquel Mateus; Rita Vilaça	Rita Vilaça (2/3); Gonçalo Pereira (1/2)
2015	João Domingues (2/2)	Bárbara Luz (2/2)	Frederico Gil; Felipe Cunha e Silva	Bárbara Luz (3/3); Cláudia Gaspar	Rita Vilaça (3/3); Gonçalo Pereira (2/2)

== Presidents ==
This a comprehensive list of all Presidents of the FPT.

Name	Presidency
Guilherme Pinto Basto	1925–1934
Rodrigo de Castro Pereira	1934–1941
António Ferro	1941–1946
André Navarro	1946–1950
Rodrigo de Castro Pereira (2)	1950–1952
Joaquim de Serra e Moura	1952–1962
José Herédia	1962–1976
Manuel Cordeiro dos Santos	1976–1981
Armando Rocha	1981–1985
Alexandre Vaz Pinto	1985–1989
José Castro Rocha	1989–1991
Manuel Cordeiro dos Santos (2)	1991–1993
Manuel Marques da Silva	1993–1997
Paulo Andrade	1997–2000
Pedro Coelho	2001–2003
Manuel Valle-Domingues	2003–2005
José Corrêa de Sampaio	2005–2009
José Maria Calheiros	2009–2011
José Corrêa de Sampaio (2)	2011–2013
Vasco Costa	2013–present
