= 2013 Fed Cup Europe/Africa Zone Group I – Pool B =

Group B of the 2013 Fed Cup Europe/Africa Zone Group I was one of four pools in the Europe/Africa zone of the 2013 Fed Cup. Four teams competed in a round robin competition, with the top team and the bottom team proceeding to their respective sections of the play-offs: the top team played for advancement to the World Group II Play-offs, while the bottom team faced potential relegation to Group II.

== Standings ==
		(United Kingdom) GBR	(Portugal) POR	(Hungary) HUN	(Bosnia and Herzegovina) BIH	RR; W–L	Match; W–L	Set; W–L	Game; W–L	Standings
18	Great Britain		2–1	2–1	3–0	3–0	7–2	15–5	101–59	1
32	Portugal	1–2		0–3	2–1	1–2	3–6	7–15	73–94	3
34	Hungary	1–2	3–0		3–0	2–1	7–2	15–6	113–81	2
44	Bosnia and Herzegovina	0–3	1–2	0–3		0–3	1–8	3–16	57–110	4

== Round-robin ==
=== Great Britain vs. Bosnia and Herzegovina ===
Great Britain
3
Municipal Tennis Club, Eilat, Israel
7 February 2013
Hard (outdoors)

Bosnia and Herzegovina
0

			1	2	3
1	(United Kingdom) (Bosnia and Herzegovina)	Anne Keothavong; Dea Herdželaš	6; 4	6; 2
2	(United Kingdom) (Bosnia and Herzegovina)	Heather Watson; Anita Husarić	6; 3	6; 4
3	(United Kingdom) (Bosnia and Herzegovina)	Johanna Konta / Laura Robson; Jasmina Kajtazovič / Jelena Simić	6; 0	6; 0

=== Portugal vs. Hungary ===
Portugal
0
Municipal Tennis Club, Eilat, Israel
7 February 2013
Hard (outdoors)

Hungary
3

			1	2	3
1	(Portugal) (Hungary)	Bárbara Luz; Gréta Arn	1; 6	2; 6
2	(Portugal) (Hungary)	Michelle Larcher de Brito; Tímea Babos	6; 3	5; 7	5; 7
3	(Portugal) (Hungary)	Margarida Moura / Joana Valle Costa; Réka-Luca Jani / Katalin Marosi	4; 6	2; 6

=== Great Britain vs. Portugal ===
Great Britain
2
Municipal Tennis Club, Eilat, Israel
8 February 2013
Hard (outdoors)

Portugal
1

			1	2	3
1	(United Kingdom) (Portugal)	Laura Robson; Margarida Moura	6; 2	6; 1
2	(United Kingdom) (Portugal)	Heather Watson; Michelle Larcher de Brito	1; 6	4; 6
3	(United Kingdom) (Portugal)	Laura Robson / Heather Watson; Michelle Larcher de Brito / Joana Valle Costa	6; 2	6; 1

=== Hungary vs. Bosnia and Herzegovina ===
Hungary
3
Municipal Tennis Club, Eilat, Israel
8 February 2013
Hard (outdoors)

Bosnia and Herzegovina
0

			1	2	3
1	(Hungary) (Bosnia and Herzegovina)	Gréta Arn; Dea Herdželaš	6; 3	6; 2
2	(Hungary) (Bosnia and Herzegovina)	Tímea Babos; Jelena Simić	6; 0	7^{7} 6^{5}
3	(Hungary) (Bosnia and Herzegovina)	Tímea Babos / Katalin Marosi; Dea Herdželaš / Anita Husarić	7; 5	6; 4

=== Great Britain vs. Hungary ===
Great Britain
2
Municipal Tennis Club, Eilat, Israel
9 February 2013
Hard (outdoors)

Hungary
1

			1	2	3
1	(United Kingdom) (Hungary)	Laura Robson; Gréta Arn	0; 6	6; 2	6; 1
2	(United Kingdom) (Hungary)	Heather Watson; Tímea Babos	6; 3	6; 2
3	(United Kingdom) (Hungary)	Johanna Konta / Laura Robson; Réka-Luca Jani / Katalin Marosi	4; 6	6; 2	2; 6

=== Portugal vs. Bosnia and Herzegovina ===
Portugal
2
Municipal Tennis Club, Eilat, Israel
9 February 2013
Hard (outdoors)

Bosnia and Herzegovina
1

			1	2	3
1	(Portugal) (Bosnia and Herzegovina)	Joana Valle Costa; Anita Husarić	3; 6	0; 6
2	(Portugal) (Bosnia and Herzegovina)	Michelle Larcher de Brito; Jelena Simić	6; 3	3; 6	6; 2
3	(Portugal) (Bosnia and Herzegovina)	Michelle Larcher de Brito / Bárbara Luz; Dea Herdželaš / Anita Husarić	6; 1	6; 0
