= 2014 Fed Cup Europe/Africa Zone Group I – Pool D =

Fed Cup Group

Group D of the 2014 Fed Cup Europe/Africa Zone Group I was one of four pools in the Europe/Africa zone of the 2014 Fed Cup. Four teams competed in a round robin competition, with the top team and the bottom team proceeding to their respective sections of the play-offs: the top team played for advancement to the World Group II Play-offs, while the bottom team faced potential relegation to Group II.

== Standings ==
		(Belarus) BLR	(Bulgaria) BUL	(Portugal) POR	(Turkey) TUR	RR; W–L	Match; W–L	Set; W–L	Game; W–L	Standings
22	Belarus		2–1	3–0	3–0	3–0	8–1	17–3	116–70	1
27	Bulgaria	1–2		1–2	1–2	0–3	3–6	9–14	101–120	4
35	Portugal	0–3	2–1		2–1	2–1	4–5	8–13	85–105	2
39	Turkey	0–3	2–1	1–2		1–2	3–6	9–13	104–111	3

== Round-robin ==
=== Belarus vs. Turkey ===
Belarus
3
Syma Sport and Events Centre, Budapest, Hungary
4 February 2014
Hard (indoors)

Turkey
0

			1	2	3
1	(Belarus) (Turkey)	Aliaksandra Sasnovich; Pemra Özgen	6; 4	6; 3
2	(Belarus) (Turkey)	Olga Govortsova; Çağla Büyükakçay	7; 5	3; 6	7^{8} 6^{6}
3	(Belarus) (Turkey)	Ilona Kremen / Iryna Shymanovich; Çağla Büyükakçay / Pemra Özgen	7; 5	6; 1

=== Bulgaria vs. Portugal ===
Bulgaria
1
Syma Sport and Events Centre, Budapest, Hungary
4 February 2014
Hard (indoors)

Portugal
2

			1	2	3
1	(Bulgaria) (Portugal)	Isabella Shinikova; Maria João Koehler	6; 3	1; 6	4; 6
2	(Bulgaria) (Portugal)	Elitsa Kostova; Michelle Larcher de Brito	6; 4	2; 6	6^{3} 7^{7}
3	(Bulgaria) (Portugal)	Isabella Shinikova / Viktoriya Tomova; Bárbara Luz / Inês Murta	6; 2	7; 5

=== Belarus vs. Portugal ===
Belarus
3
Syma Sport and Events Centre, Budapest, Hungary
6 February 2014
Hard (indoors)

Portugal
0

			1	2	3
1	(Belarus) (Portugal)	Aliaksandra Sasnovich; Maria João Koehler	6; 3	6; 4
2	(Belarus) (Portugal)	Olga Govortsova; Michelle Larcher de Brito	6; 1	6; 3
3	(Belarus) (Portugal)	Ilona Kremen / Iryna Shymanovich; Michelle Larcher de Brito / Bárbara Luz	6; 1	6; 0

=== Bulgaria vs. Turkey ===
Bulgaria
1
Syma Sport and Events Centre, Budapest, Hungary
6 February 2014
Hard (indoors)

Turkey
2

			1	2	3
1	(Bulgaria) (Turkey)	Isabella Shinikova; Pemra Özgen	6; 2	3; 6	6; 4
2	(Bulgaria) (Turkey)	Elitsa Kostova; Çağla Büyükakçay	6^{3} 7^{7}	1; 6
3	(Bulgaria) (Turkey)	Elitsa Kostova / Isabella Shinikova; Çağla Büyükakçay / Pemra Özgen	7; 5	1; 6	5; 7

=== Belarus vs. Bulgaria ===
Belarus
2
Syma Sport and Events Centre, Budapest, Hungary
7 February 2014
Hard (indoors)

Bulgaria
1

			1	2	3
1	(Belarus) (Bulgaria)	Aliaksandra Sasnovich; Borislava Botusharova	6; 1	6; 3
2	(Belarus) (Bulgaria)	Olga Govortsova; Viktoriya Tomova	6; 3	6; 4
3	(Belarus) (Bulgaria)	Ilona Kremen / Iryna Shymanovich; Elitsa Kostova / Viktoriya Tomova	6; 4	3; 6	5; 7

=== Portugal vs. Turkey ===
Portugal
2
Syma Sport and Events Centre, Budapest, Hungary
7 February 2014
Hard (indoors)

Turkey
1

			1	2	3
1	(Portugal) (Turkey)	Bárbara Luz; İpek Soylu	6^{3} 7^{7}	2; 6
2	(Portugal) (Turkey)	Michelle Larcher de Brito; Çağla Büyükakçay	6; 4	6; 2
3	(Portugal) (Turkey)	Michelle Larcher de Brito / Bárbara Luz; Çağla Büyükakçay / Pemra Özgen	2; 6	6; 3	6; 3
