= 2012 Fed Cup Europe/Africa Zone Group I – Pool C =

Group C of the 2012 Fed Cup Europe/Africa Zone Group I was one of four pools in the Europe/Africa zone of the 2012 Fed Cup. Three teams competed in a round robin competition, with the top team and the bottom team proceeding to their respective sections of the play-offs: the top team played for advancement to the World Group II Play-offs, while the bottom team faced potential relegation to Group II.

		(Netherlands) NED	(United Kingdom) GBR	(Israel) ISR	(Portugal) POR	RR; W–L	Set; W–L	Game; W–L	Standings
23	Netherlands		1–2	1–2	1–2	0–3	9–13	105–112	4
26	Great Britain	2–1		3–0	3–0	3–0	17–2	112–47	1
36	Israel	2–1	0–3		1–2	1–2	7–14	81–106	3
46	Portugal	2–1	0–3	2–1		2–1	8–12	87–96	2

== Netherlands vs. Israel ==
Netherlands
1
Municipal Tennis Club, Eilat, Israel
1 February 2012
Hard (outdoors)

Israel
2

			1	2	3
1	(Netherlands) (Israel)	Bibiane Schoofs; Julia Glushko	6; 3	7; 5
2	(Netherlands) (Israel)	Michaëlla Krajicek; Shahar Pe'er	7; 5	6^{5} 7^{7}	1; 6
3	(Netherlands) (Israel)	Michaëlla Krajicek / Bibiane Schoofs; Julia Glushko / Shahar Pe'er	6^{3} 7^{7}	6; 2	3; 6

== Great Britain vs. Portugal ==
Great Britain
3
Municipal Tennis Club, Eilat, Israel
1 February 2012
Hard (outdoors)

Portugal
0

			1	2	3
1	(United Kingdom) (Portugal)	Anne Keothavong; Maria João Koehler	6; 3	6; 4
2	(United Kingdom) (Portugal)	Elena Baltacha; Michelle Larcher de Brito	6; 2	6; 3
3	(United Kingdom) (Portugal)	Laura Robson / Heather Watson; Maria João Koehler / Michelle Larcher de Brito	7; 5	6; 0

== Netherlands vs. Great Britain ==
Netherlands
1
Municipal Tennis Club, Eilat, Israel
2 February 2012
Hard (outdoors)

Great Britain
2

			1	2	3
1	(Netherlands) (United Kingdom)	Bibiane Schoofs; Anne Keothavong	6; 3	6^{3} 7^{7}	6; 3
2	(Netherlands) (United Kingdom)	Michaëlla Krajicek; Elena Baltacha	3; 6	3; 6
3	(Netherlands) (United Kingdom)	Kiki Bertens / Bibiane Schoofs; Laura Robson / Heather Watson	5; 7	6^{5} 7^{7}

== Israel vs. Portugal ==
Israel
1
Municipal Tennis Club, Eilat, Israel
2 February 2012
Hard (outdoors)

Portugal
2

			1	2	3
1	(Israel) (Portugal)	Julia Glushko; Maria João Koehler	6; 2	6; 4
2	(Israel) (Portugal)	Shahar Pe'er; Michelle Larcher de Brito	1; 6	2; 6
3	(Israel) (Portugal)	Julia Glushko / Shahar Pe'er; Maria João Koehler / Michelle Larcher de Brito	2; 6	6; 4	4; 6

== Netherlands vs. Portugal ==
Netherlands
1
Municipal Tennis Club, Eilat, Israel
3 February 2012
Hard (outdoors)

Portugal
2

			1	2	3
1	(Netherlands) (Portugal)	Bibiane Schoofs; Maria João Koehler	5; 7	6; 4	2; 6
2	(Netherlands) (Portugal)	Michaëlla Krajicek; Michelle Larcher de Brito	1; 6	2; 6
3	(Netherlands) (Portugal)	Kiki Bertens / Demi Schuurs; Bárbara Luz / Margarida Moura	6; 3	6; 0

== Israel vs. Great Britain ==
Israel
0
Municipal Tennis Club, Eilat, Israel
3 February 2012
Hard (outdoors)

Great Britain
3

			1	2	3
1	(Israel) (United Kingdom)	Julia Glushko; Anne Keothavong	2; 6	1; 6
2	(Israel) (United Kingdom)	Shahar Pe'er; Elena Baltacha	4; 6	3; 6
3	(Israel) (United Kingdom)	Julia Glushko / Keren Shlomo; Laura Robson / Heather Watson	2; 6	1; 6
