= Margarida Moura =

Portuguese tennis player (born 1993)

- Country (sports): Portugal
- Born: 30 July 1993 (age 33) Porto, Portugal
- Prize money: $14,690

Singles
- Career record: 27–72
- Career titles: 0
- Highest ranking: No. 719 (11 June 2012)

Doubles
- Career record: 43–74
- Career titles: 2 ITF
- Highest ranking: No. 504 (15 April 2013)

Team competitions
- Fed Cup: 0–3

Margarida Moura (born 30 July 1993 in Porto) is a Portuguese former tennis player.

She won two doubles titles on the ITF Circuit in her career. On 11 June 2012, she reached her best singles ranking of world No. 719. On 15 April 2013, she peaked at No. 504 in the WTA doubles rankings.

Playing for the Portugal Fed Cup team, Moura has a 0–3 win–loss record.

== ITF Circuit finals ==
=== Doubles: 4 (2 titles, 2 runner-ups) ===
| Legend $50,000 tournaments $25,000 tournaments $10,000 tournaments | Finals by surface Hard (1–0) Clay (0–2) Carpet (1–0) |

| Result | Date | Tournament | Surface | Partner | Opponents | Score |
|---|---|---|---|---|---|---|
| Win | May 2012 | ITF Cantanhede, Portugal | Carpet | (Portugal) Joana Valle Costa | (Spain) Aida Martínez Sanjuán (Spain) Paula Mocete Talamantes | 7–5, 6–1 |
| Loss | Jun 2012 | ITF Madrid, Spain | Clay | (Spain) Olga Parres Azcoitia | (Argentina) Tatiana Búa (Argentina) Melina Ferrero | 4–6, 1–6 |
| Loss | Jul 2012 | ITF Knokke, Belgium | Clay | (Argentina) Tatiana Búa | (Spain) Beatriz Morales Hernández (Australia) Alexandra Nancarrow | 1–6, 6–4, [6–10] |
| Win | Nov 2012 | ITF Guimarães, Portugal | Hard | (Portugal) Joana Valle Costa | (Liechtenstein) Kathinka von Deichmann (Germany) Stefanie Stemmer | 7–5, 3–6, [10–7] |

== Fed Cup participation ==
=== Singles ===
| Edition | Stage | Date | Location | Against | Surface | Opponent | W/L | Score |
|---|---|---|---|---|---|---|---|---|
| 2013 Fed Cup; Europe/Africa Zone Group I | R/R | 8 February 2013 | Eilat, Israel | (United Kingdom) Great Britain | Hard | (United Kingdom) Laura Robson | L | 2–6, 1–6 |

=== Doubles ===
| Edition | Stage | Date | Location | Against | Surface | Partner | Opponents | W/L | Score |
|---|---|---|---|---|---|---|---|---|---|
| 2012 Fed Cup; Europe/Africa; Zone Group I | R/R | 3 February 2012 | Eilat, Israel | Netherlands | Hard | (Portugal) Bárbara Luz | (Netherlands) Kiki Bertens (Netherlands) Demi Schuurs | L | 3–6, 0–6 |
| 2013 Fed Cup; Europe/Africa; Zone Group I | R/R | 7 February 2013 | Eilat, Israel | Hungary | Hard | (Portugal) Joana Valle Costa | (Hungary) Réka Luca Jani (Hungary) Katalin Marosi | L | 4–6, 2–6 |
