= Bárbara Luz =

Portuguese tennis player (born 1993)

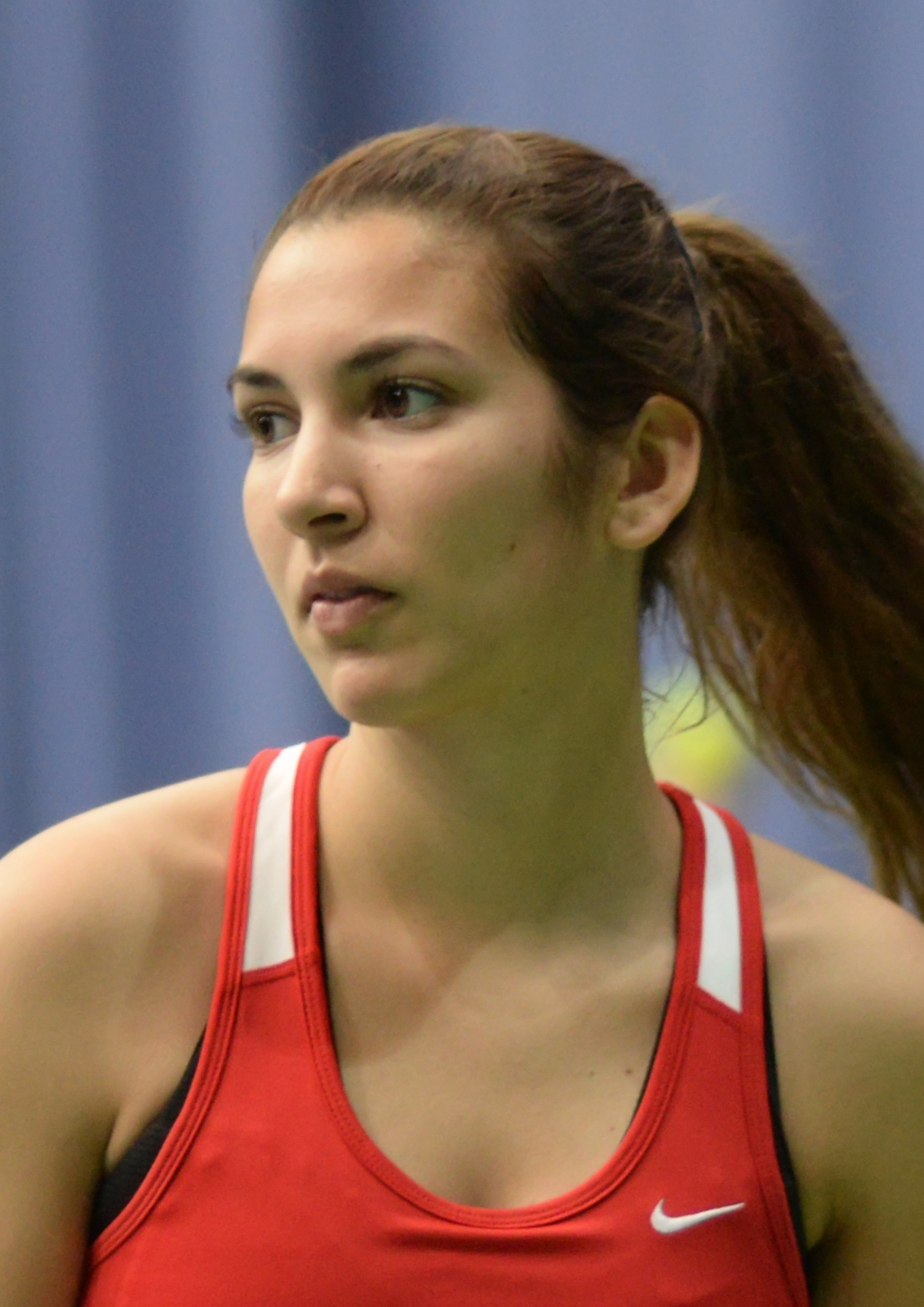
- Luz at the 2015 Fed Cup
- Country (sports): Portugal
- Born: 28 May 1993 (age 31); Coimbra
- Height: 1.70 m (5 ft 7 in)
- Prize money: $39,747

Singles
- Career record: 112–86
- Career titles: 3 ITF
- Highest ranking: No. 368 (26 May 2014)

Doubles
- Career record: 46–66
- Career titles: 1 ITF
- Highest ranking: No. 446 (20 October 2014)

Team competitions
- Fed Cup: 2–9

Bárbara Luz (born 28 May 1993) is a former professional tennis player from Portugal.

She won three singles titles and one doubles title on the ITF Circuit. On 26 May 2014, she reached a career-high singles ranking of world No. 368. On 20 October 2014, she peaked at No. 446 in the WTA doubles rankings.

Playing for the Portugal Fed Cup team, Luz has a 2–9 win–loss record.

== ITF finals ==
=== Singles: 9 (3 titles, 6 runner-ups) ===
Legend $50,000 tournaments $25,000 tournaments $10,000 tournaments	Finals by surface Hard (2–3) Clay (0–3) Carpet (1–0)

Result	W–L	Date	Tournament	Surface	Opponent	Score
Loss	0–1	Jun 2011	ITF Amarante, Portugal	Hard	(Portugal) Magali de Lattre	1–6, 1–6
Loss	0–2	Oct 2011	ITF São Paulo, Brazil	Clay	(Brazil) Paula Cristina Gonçalves	2–6, 3–6
Loss	0–3	Oct 2011	ITF Goiânia, Brazil	Clay	(Brazil) Beatriz Haddad Maia	2–6, 0–6
Win	1–3	Mar 2013	ITF Hyderabad, India	Hard	(India) Ankita Raina	4–6, 7–6^{(7–5)}, 7–6^{(7–3)}
Win	2–3	Mar 2013	ITF Hyderabad, India	Hard	(India) Ankita Raina	2–6, 6–3, 6–1
Win	3–3	Jun 2013	ITF Cantanhede, Portugal	Carpet	(Italy) Alice Balducci	6–3, 2–6, 7–5
Loss	3–4	Feb 2014	ITF Palma Nova, Spain	Clay	(Russia) Ekaterina Lopes	4–6, 2–6
Loss	3–5	Mar 2014	ITF Ponta Delgada, Portugal	Hard	(Russia) Ekaterina Lopes	4–6, 2–6
Loss	3–6	Mar 2014	ITF Ponta Delgada, Portugal	Hard	(Belgium) Elise Mertens	2–6, 4–6

=== Doubles: 4 (1 title, 3 runner-ups) ===
Legend $25,000 tournaments $10,000 tournaments	Finals by surface Hard (1–2) Clay (0–1)

Result	W–L	Date	Tournament	Surface	Partner	Opponents	Score
Loss	0–1	Oct 2010	ITF Espinho, Portugal	Clay	(United States) Samantha Powers	(Norway) Ulrikke Eikeri (Germany) Lena-Marie Hofmann	3–6, 1–6
Loss	0–2	Nov 2011	ITF Salvador, Brazil	Hard	(Brazil) Karina Venditti	(Brazil) Marcela Bueno (Brazil) Flávia Guimarães Bueno	6–7^{(2–7)}, 1–3 ret.
Loss	0–3	Apr 2013	ITF Antalya, Turkey	Hard	(Brazil) Beatriz Haddad Maia	(Romania) Irina Bara (Romania) Diana Buzean	5–7, 1–6
Win	1–3	Nov 2013	ITF Sant Jordi, Spain	Hard	(Spain) Nuria Párrizas Díaz	(India) Sowjanya Bavisetti (Spain) Lucía Cervera Vázquez	7–5, 6–4

== Fed Cup/Billie Jean King Cup participation ==
=== Singles ===
Edition	Stage	Date	Location	Against	Surface	Opponent	W/L	Score
2013	Z1 R/R	Feb 2013	Eilat, Israel	Hungary	Hard	(Hungary) Gréta Arn	L	1–6, 2–6
2014	Z1 R/R	Feb 2014	Budapest, Hungary	Turkey	Hard (i)	(Turkey) İpek Soylu	L	6–7^{(3–7)}, 2–6
2014	Z1 P/O	Feb 2014	Budapest, Hungary	Belgium	Hard (i)	(Belgium) An-Sophie Mestach	L	6–2, 0–6, 2–6

=== Doubles ===
Edition	Stage	Date	Location	Against	Surface	Partner	Opponents	W/L	Score
2012	Z1 R/R	Feb 2012	Eilat, Israel	Netherlands	Hard	(Portugal) Margarida Moura	(Netherlands) Kiki Bertens (Netherlands) Demi Schuurs	L	3–6, 0–6
2013	Z1 R/R	Feb 2013	Eilat, Israel	Bosnia and Herzegovina	Hard	(Portugal) Michelle Larcher de Brito	(Bosnia and Herzegovina) Anita Husarić (Bosnia and Herzegovina) Dea Herdželaš	W	6–1, 6–0
2014	Z1 R/R	Feb 2014	Budapest, Hungary	Bulgaria	Hard (i)	(Portugal) Inês Murta	(Bulgaria) Isabella Shinikova (Bulgaria) Viktoriya Tomova	L	2–6, 5–7
2014	Z1 R/R	Feb 2014	Budapest, Hungary	Belarus	Hard (i)	(Portugal) Michelle Larcher de Brito	(Belarus) Ilona Kremen (Belarus) Iryna Shymanovich	L	1–6, 0–6
2014	Z1 R/R	Feb 2014	Budapest, Hungary	Turkey	Hard (i)	(Portugal) Michelle Larcher de Brito	(Turkey) Çağla Büyükakçay (Turkey) Pemra Özgen	W	2–6, 6–3, 6–3
2014	Z1 P/O	Feb 2014	Budapest, Hungary	Belgium	Hard (i)	(Portugal) Michelle Larcher de Brito	(Belgium) Ysaline Bonaventure (Belgium) An-Sophie Mestach	L	6–7^{(3–7)}, 0–6
2015	Z1 R/R	Feb 2015	Budapest, Hungary	Bulgaria	Hard (i)	(Portugal) Michelle Larcher de Brito	(Bulgaria) Dia Evtimova (Bulgaria) Viktoriya Tomova	L	0–6, 3–6
2015	Z1 R/R	Feb 2015	Budapest, Hungary	Belarus	Hard (i)	(Portugal) Inês Murta	(Belarus) Vera Lapko (Belarus) Aliaksandra Sasnovich	L	4–6, 7–6^{(7–2)}, 2–6
