= Rita Vilaça =

Portuguese tennis player (born 1993)

- Country (sports): Portugal
- Born: 7 September 1993 (age 31); Braga, Portugal
- Prize money: $9,504

Singles
- Career record: 21–57
- Career titles: 0
- Highest ranking: No. 1020 (3 October 2011)

Doubles
- Career record: 22–21
- Career titles: 1 ITF
- Highest ranking: No. 741 (24 June 2013)

Team competitions
- Fed Cup: 0–2

Rita Vilaça (born 7 September 1993) is a Portuguese former tennis player.

Vilaça won one doubles title on the ITF Women's Circuit in her career. On 24 June 2013, she peaked at No. 741 in the WTA doubles rankings.

Playing for Portugal Fed Cup team, Vilaça has a win–loss record of 0–2.
