= Joana Valle Costa =

Portuguese tennis player (born 1995)

- Country (sports): Portugal
- Born: 31 October 1995 (age 29); Lisbon, Portugal
- Prize money: $9,416

Singles
- Career record: 19–25
- Career titles: 0
- Highest ranking: No. 782 (27 May 2013)

Doubles
- Career record: 17–21
- Career titles: 2 ITF
- Highest ranking: No. 709 (25 February 2013)

Team competitions
- Fed Cup: 0–3

Joana Valle Costa (born 31 October 1995) is a Portuguese former professional tennis player.

== Life ==
Costa won two doubles titles on the ITF Circuit in her career. On 27 May 2013, she reached her best singles ranking of world No. 782. On 25 February 2013, she peaked at No. 709 in the doubles rankings.

Valle Costa has a 0–3 record for Portugal in Fed Cup competition.

== ITF finals ==
=== Singles (0–1) ===
Legend $25,000 tournaments $10,000 tournaments	Finals by surface Hard (0–1) Clay (0–0)

Outcome	No.	Date	Tournament	Surface	Opponent	Score
Runner-up	1.	4 June 2012	ITF Amarante, Portugal	Hard	(France) Virginie Ayassamy	4–6, 6–1, 2–6

=== Doubles (2–0) ===
Legend $25,000 tournaments $10,000 tournaments	Finals by surface Hard (1–0) Carpet (1–0)

Outcome	No.	Date	Tournament	Surface	Partner	Opponents	Score
Winner	1.	28 May 2012	ITF Cantanhede, Portugal	Carpet	(Portugal) Margarida Moura	(Spain) Aida Martínez Sanjuán (Spain) Paula Mocete Talamantes	7–5, 6–1
Winner	2.	5 November 2012	ITF Guimarães, Portugal	Hard	(Portugal) Margarida Moura	(Liechtenstein) Kathinka von Deichmann (Germany) Stefanie Stemmer	7–5, 3–6, [10–7]

== Fed Cup participation ==
=== Singles ===
Edition	Stage	Date	Location	Against	Surface	Opponent	W/L	Score
2013 Fed Cup; Europe/Africa Zone Group I	R/R	9 February 2013	Eilat, Israel	Bosnia and Herzegovina	Hard	(Bosnia and Herzegovina) Anita Husarić	L	3–6, 0–6

=== Doubles ===
Edition	Stage	Date	Location	Against	Surface	Partner	Opponents	W/L	Score
2013 Fed Cup; Europe/Africa Zone Group I	R/R	7 February 2013	Eilat, Israel	Hungary	Hard	(Portugal) Margarida Moura	(Hungary) Réka Luca Jani (Hungary) Katalin Marosi	L	4–6, 2–6
2013 Fed Cup; Europe/Africa Zone Group I	R/R	8 February 2013	Eilat, Israel	(United Kingdom) Great Britain	Hard	(Portugal) Michelle Larcher de Brito	(United Kingdom) Laura Robson (United Kingdom) Heather Watson	L	2–6, 1–6
