= Jelena Simić =

Bosnian tennis player

- Country (sports): Bosnia and Herzegovina
- Born: 19 February 1992 (age 33); Bijeljina, SR Bosnia and Herzegovina, SFR Yugoslavia
- Prize money: $60,476

Singles
- Career record: 213–154
- Career titles: 5 ITF
- Highest ranking: No. 433 (1 August 2016)

Doubles
- Career record: 115–91
- Career titles: 8 ITF
- Highest ranking: No. 426 (30 April 2018)

Team competitions
- Fed Cup: 7–15

Jelena Simić (Bosnian pronunciation: [jělena sǐːmitɕ]; born 19 February 1992) is a Bosnian former tennis player.

To date, she has won five singles titles and eight doubles titles on the ITF Women's Circuit. On 1 August 2016, she reached her best singles ranking of world No. 433. On 30 April 2018, she peaked at No. 426 in the doubles rankings.

Playing for Bosnia and Herzegovina Fed Cup team, Simić has a win–loss record of 7–15.

== ITF Circuit finals ==
=== Singles: 9 (5–4) ===
Legend $25,000 tournaments $15,000 tournaments $10,000 tournaments	Finals by surface Hard (1–0) Clay (4–3) Carpet (0–1)

Result	No.	Date	Tournament	Surface	Opponent	Score
Win	1.	27 July 2015	ITF Tunis, Tunisia	Clay	(Russia) Maria Marfutina	1–6, 6–3, 6–4
Win	2.	3 August 2015	ITF Tunis, Tunisia	Clay	(Serbia) Barbara Bonić	6–2, 6–4
Loss	1.	10 August 2015	ITF Tunis, Tunisia	Clay	(Bosnia and Herzegovina) Dea Herdželaš	6–3, 6–7^{(6)}, 3–6
Win	3.	9 November 2015	ITF Port El Kantaoui, Tunisia	Hard	(Bosnia and Herzegovina) Ema Burgić	3–6, 6–1, 6–4
Loss	2.	5 December 2016	ITF Hammamet, Tunisia	Clay	(Greece) Valentini Grammatikopoulou	1–6, 3–6
Loss	3.	12 December 2016	ITF Hammamet, Tunisia	Clay	(Brazil) Carolina Alves	0–6, 6–4, 5–7
Win	4.	5 February 2017	ITF Hammamet, Tunisia	Clay	(Russia) Yana Sizikova	6–7^{(5)}, 6–4, 7–6^{(2)}
Win	5.	12 May 2017	ITF Hammamet, Tunisia	Clay	(Belgium) Déborah Kerfs	7–6^{(1)}, 2–6, 6–4
Loss	4.	15 December 2018	ITF Solarino, Italy	Carpet	(Spain) Júlia Payola	2–6, 6–2, 6–7^{(4)}

=== Doubles: 17 (8–9) ===
Legend $25,000 tournaments $15,000 tournaments $10,000 tournaments	Finals by surface Hard (3–2) Clay (5–7)

Result	No.	Date	Tier	Tournament	Surface	Partner	Opponents	Score
Loss	1.	17 November 2014	10,000	ITF Sousse, Tunisia	Hard	(Bosnia and Herzegovina) Dea Herdželaš	(Russia) Natela Dzalamidze (Ukraine) Oleksandra Korashvili	3–6, 1–6
Win	1.	27 July 2015	10,000	ITF Tunis, Tunisia	Clay	(Argentina) Sofía Luini	(Germany) Alina Wessel (Slovakia) Lenka Wienerová	7–6^{(5)}, 3–6, [10–8]
Win	2.	28 September 2015	10,000	ITF Port El Kantaoui, Tunisia	Hard	(Greece) Valentini Grammatikopoulou	(Sweden) Anette Munozova (Russia) Yana Sizikova	4–6, 6–4, [10–6]
Win	3.	12 October 2015	10,000	ITF Port El Kantaoui, Tunisia	Hard	(Ukraine) Valeriya Strakhova	(Belgium) Sofie Oyen (India) Kyra Shroff	6–3, 6–4
Win	4.	9 November 2015	10,000	ITF Port El Kantaoui, Tunisia	Hard	(Bosnia and Herzegovina) Ema Burgić	(United Kingdom) Mirabelle Njoze (United States) Miranda Ramirez	7–6^{(4)}, 6–4
Loss	2.	26 September 2016	10,000	ITF Pula, Italy	Clay	(India) Snehadevi Reddy	(Czech Republic) Petra Krejsová (Italy) Dalila Spiteri	0–6, 6–1, [3–10]
Win	5.	12 December 2016	10,000	ITF Hammamet, Tunisia	Clay	(Serbia) Tamara Čurović	(France) Audrey Albié (France) Jade Suvrijn	w/o
Loss	3.	27 March 2017	15,000	ITF Antalya, Turkey	Clay	(Slovakia) Sandra Jamrichová	(Kyrgyzstan) Ksenia Palkina (Georgia (country)) Sofia Shapatava	4–6, 5–7
Loss	4.	12 May 2017	15,000	ITF Hammamet, Tunisia	Clay	(Serbia) Natalija Kostić	(Australia) Naiktha Bains (Switzerland) Chiara Grimm	6–4, 3–6, [4–10]
Win	6.	20 May 2017	15,000	ITF Hammamet, Tunisia	Clay	(Serbia) Natalija Kostić	(Germany) Lisa Ponomar (Italy) Dalila Spiteri	6–4, 6–4
Win	7.	26 November 2017	15,000	ITF Hammamet, Tunisia	Clay	(Portugal) Inês Murta	(Russia) Yulia Kulikova (Romania) Denise-Antonela Stoica	7–5, 5–7, [10–7]
Loss	5.	3 December 2017	15,000	ITF Hammamet, Tunisia	Clay	(France) Jade Suvrijn	(Italy) Anna-Giulia Remondina (Italy) Miriana Tona	3–6, 4–6
Loss	6.	27 January 2018	15,000	ITF Hammamet, Tunisia	Clay	(Serbia) Natalija Kostić	(Switzerland) Karin Kennel (Russia) Maria Marfutina	4–6, 3–6
Win	8.	2 February 2018	15,000	ITF Hammamet, Tunisia	Clay	(Serbia) Natalija Kostić	(Venezuela) Andrea Gámiz (Argentina) Guadalupe Pérez Rojas	w/o
Loss	7.	10 February 2018	15,000	ITF Hammamet, Tunisia	Clay	(Serbia) Natalija Kostić	(Germany) Nora Niedmers (Germany) Natalia Siedliska	6–7^{(7)}, 6–0, [6–10]
Loss	8.	14 April 2018	25,000	ITF Pula, Italy	Clay	(United States) Chiara Scholl	(Netherlands) Bibiane Schoofs (Slovakia) Chantal Škamlová	2–6, 6–3, [7–10]
Loss	9.	10 November 2018	15,000	ITF Sharm El Sheik, Egypt	Hard	(Romania) Elena-Teodora Cadar	(Russia) Anna Morgina (Ukraine) Anastasiya Shoshyna	6–3, 3–6, [5–10]
