= Michelle Larcher de Brito =

Portuguese tennis player (born 1993)

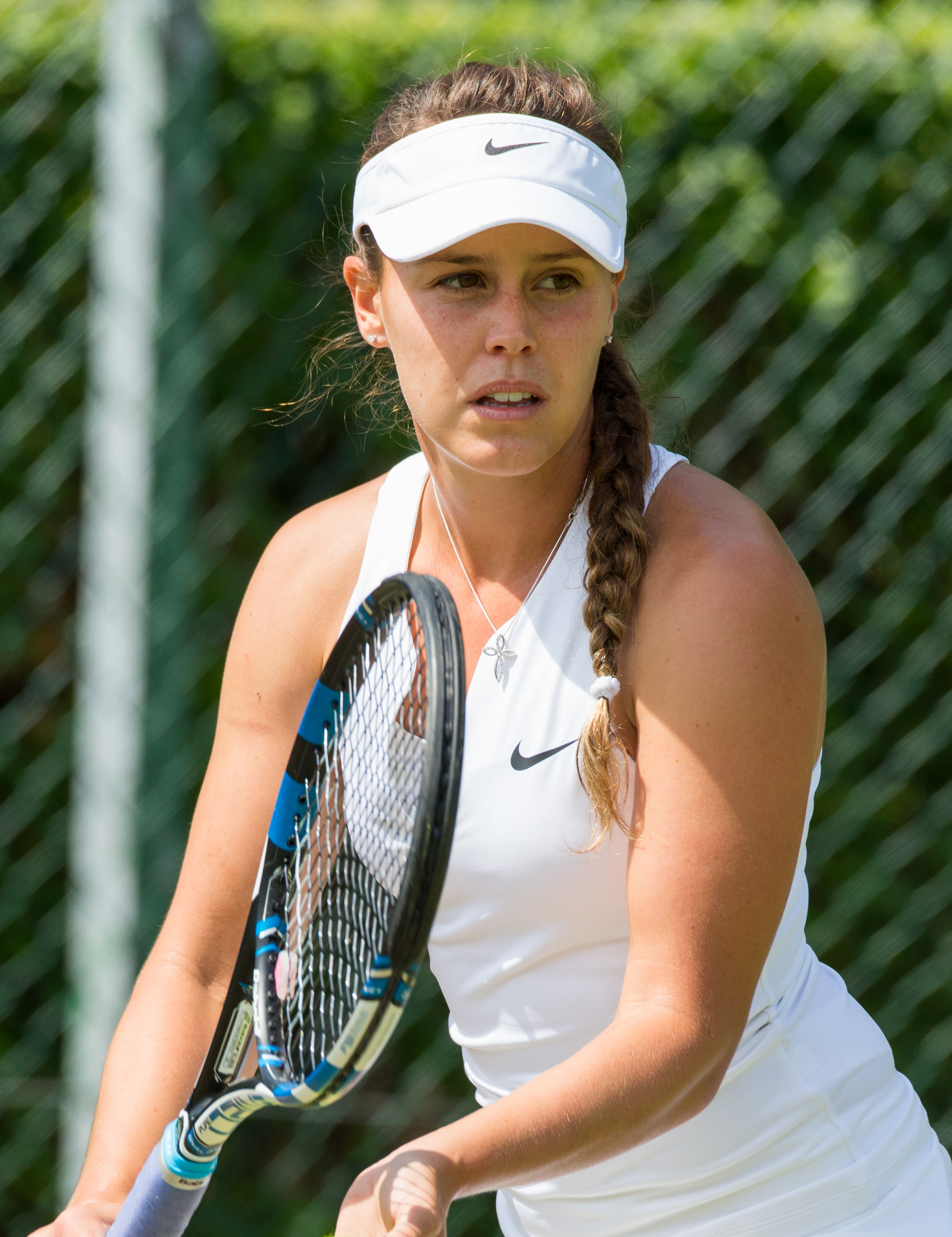
- Larcher de Brito at the 2015 Wimbledon qualifying
- Country (sports): Portugal
- Residence: Lisbon, Portugal
- Born: 29 January 1993 (age 33) Lisbon
- Height: 1.65 m (5 ft 5 in)
- Turned pro: 7 February 2007
- Retired: 2018
- Plays: Right-handed (two-handed backhand)
- Prize money: $924,144

Singles
- Career record: 257–211
- Career titles: 4 ITF
- Highest ranking: No. 76 (6 July 2009)

Grand Slam singles results
- Australian Open: 1R (2013)
- French Open: 3R (2009)
- Wimbledon: 3R (2013, 2014)
- US Open: 2R (2009, 2013)

Doubles
- Career record: 2–8
- Career titles: 0
- Highest ranking: No. 535 (28 February 2011)

Team competitions
- Fed Cup: 25–23

Micaela Carolina Larcher de Brito (born 29 January 1993), known by the anglicized name Michelle Larcher de Brito, is a Portuguese former professional tennis player. She is the former Portuguese No. 1. Larcher de Brito won four singles titles on the ITF Women's Circuit in her career. On 6 July 2009, she reached her best singles ranking of world No. 76.

Upon entering the 2009 French Open, Larcher de Brito became the second Portuguese female player ever to appear in the main draw of a Grand Slam tournament (after Deborah Fiuza in the 1975 Australian Open). She reached the third round, which remains her best ever result at a major (repeated at the 2013 and 2014 Wimbledon Championships). Playing for the Portugal Fed Cup team, she has a win–loss record of 25–23.

Larcher de Brito is now a real estate agent.

== Biography ==
Larcher de Brito was born in the Portuguese capital, Lisbon. She moved with her family to the United States when she was nine years old so she could attend the Nick Bollettieri Tennis Academy in Bradenton, Florida, where she remained until the end of 2007. She trained full-time with her father, António Larcher de Brito, who is Portuguese and from Angola. Her mother, Caroline, is from South Africa. She has two older brothers who are twins, Sérgio and Sebastião, born in 1989. She began playing at the age of 3 when her father introduced her at a local club. As a baseliner whose main attributes are her groundstrokes and movement, she won the 2008 Revelation Award from the Fundação Luso-Brasileira (Portuguese-Brazilian Foundation) and, as a result, appeared in the pages of Elle Portugal. In 2009, she won the Confederação do Desporto de Portugal (Portuguese Sports Confederation) female athlete of the year award against such rivals as Vanessa Fernandes and Telma Monteiro.

== Career ==
=== Junior ===
Larcher de Brito played on the ITF Junior Circuit from August 2006 to December 2007, winning three singles tournaments. At Grand Slam tournaments, she made it to the singles quarterfinals of the 2007 French Open and the doubles quarterfinals of the 2007 Wimbledon Championships. She won her last tournament, the 2007 Orange Bowl, becoming, at 14 years, 10 months and 11 days, the second youngest champion of the event's history after Nicole Vaidišová. She was also the youngest player ever to win the U-16 Eddie Herr Championship (in 2005 when she was 12). Her best junior ranking was 19th with a 54–16 singles record and a 10–17 doubles record.

=== 2007 ===
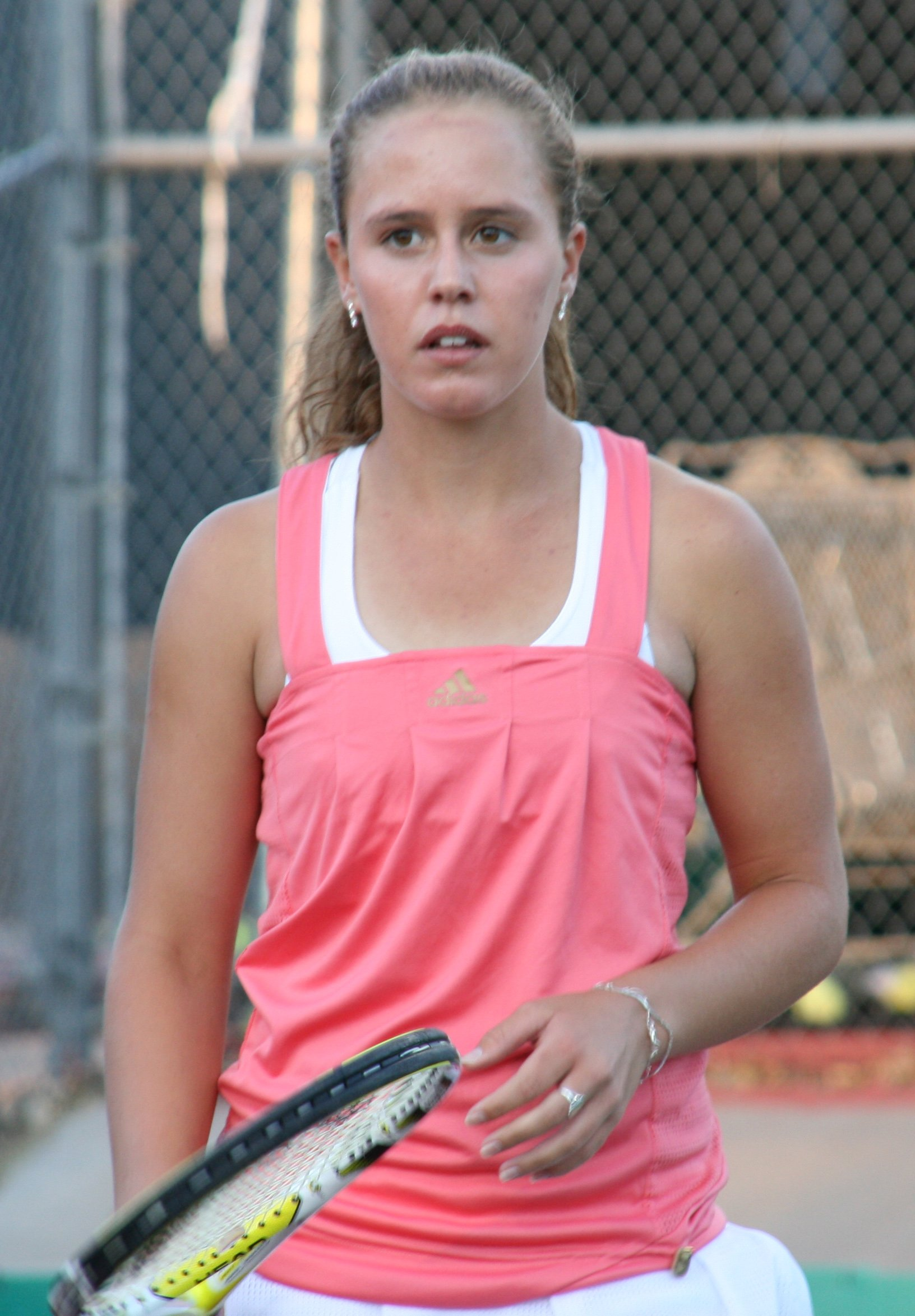
Larcher de Brito at the 2007 Championships in Albuquerque

Larcher de Brito made her debut on the ITF Women's Circuit in early February 2007, at the $75k hardcourt tournament in Midland, Michigan. There, as an unranked wildcard, she lost in the first round of both singles (against world No. 185, Kristina Brandi) and doubles, teaming with Gréta Arn, against the pairing of Julie Ditty and Natalie Grandin). She would make her WTA Tour debut as an unranked wildcard at the Miami Open, reaching the second round before falling to the 16th seed Daniela Hantuchová in straight sets. At 14 years, one month and three days, Brito became the seventh-youngest player in the history of the WTA tour to win a singles main draw match by beating Meghann Shaughnessy in the first round and the youngest since the Age Eligibility Rule was implemented in 1995. Despite this achievement, due to her age, she wasn't allowed to play any more senior tournaments until September. During that time, she played for the Sacramento Capitals in the World TeamTennis, becoming the youngest player ever to be drafted in the competition. She would be instrumental in the Capitals victory in the 2007 championship. In her return to the ITF Circuit, she became the first Portuguese player to reach a semifinal at a $75k event in Albuquerque, New Mexico, losing to third seed Rossana de los Ríos. The feat allowed her to debut in the WTA rankings at world No. 364.

=== 2008 ===
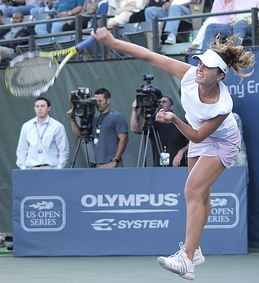
Facing Serena Williams at the 2008 Bank of the West Classic

In February, Larcher de Brito defeated world No. 124, Stéphanie Cohen-Aloro, in the first round of the Cellular South Cup, but lost in the second round to the world No. 43, Caroline Wozniacki, in straight sets.

On 28 March 2008, on her return to the Miami Masters, she upset world No. 16, Agnieszka Radwańska, in the second round. She would then lose to world No. 19, Shahar Pe'er. In the first round she defeated world No. 75, Ekaterina Makarova, in three sets. The following month, she debuted on her home tournament, the Portugal Open, where she lost to world No. 471, Sanda Mamić.

In June, she failed to qualify for Wimbledon, losing to world No. 105, Stéphanie Foretz Gacon, in the preliminary rounds.

On 16 July 2008, she nearly won the best victory of her career, narrowly losing to former world No. 1 player, Serena Williams, in three sets. The day before, she had beaten world No. 34, Gisela Dulko, in straight sets.

Based on her good Bank of the West Classic tournament performance, where she won three qualifying matches and one main draw match, on 21 July 2008, Larcher de Brito's WTA singles ranking rose 56 places from the previous week, from No. 226 to 170 in the world, her then best ranking ever. With that ranking she became the highest ranked female Portuguese player, ahead of then world No. 192, Neuza Silva. At the Canada Masters, Larcher de Brito won two qualifying matches to make it into the main draw. She then went on to defeat world No. 97, Vania King, in the first round and world No. 18, Flavia Pennetta, in the second, before losing to fourth seed Svetlana Kuznetsova. After such a great performance by the 15-year-old, she rose to No. 131 in the world, making her the highest ranked Portuguese tennis player of all time.

At the US Open, Larcher de Brito reached the third round of qualifying, beating world No. 165, Angela Haynes, and world No. 169, Abigail Spears, but lost to Raluca Olaru in straight sets.

Her most significant result of the season came in October at the Tashkent Open where she reached her first quarterfinal on the WTA Tour. She would lose to third seed and eventual champion Sorana Cîrstea, after she defeated Andreja Klepač and Tatiana Poutchek in the first two rounds.

=== 2009 ===
Larcher de Brito obtained an invite from the Hong Kong Tennis Patrons' Association twice again to play 2009 JB Group Classic for Team Europe with Jelena Janković and Ágnes Szávay, they lost to Team America (include two Americans Venus Williams, CoCo Vandeweghe and Argentine Gisela Dulko) 1–2 in the semifinals and then they lost to Team Asia Pacific (include Chinese Zheng Jie, Indian Sania Mirza and Zhang Ling from Hong Kong) 0–3 in the Silver Group final.

Larcher de Brito begun the season at the Australian Open where she reached the second qualifying round losing to world No. 169, Alberta Brianti. This was followed by a second round finish in Memphis, losing to world No. 52, Anne Keothavong, after defeating world No. 91, Sofia Arvidsson, in the first round and a qualification to Indian Wells, losing to world No. 107, Urszula Radwańska, in the first round. In Miami, after successful tournaments as a wildcard the two previous years, she failed to qualify this time by losing in the first qualifying round to Aravane Rezaï.

In April, she debuted in the Fed Cup, helping Portugal qualify to the Europe/Africa Group I with a 2–1 singles record.

At Estoril in May, she lost in straight sets to world No. 165, Elena Bovina, in the third qualifying round, but qualified to the main tournament as a lucky loser. She lost to seventh seed Shahar Pe'er. The following week at the Madrid Open, as the last direct acceptance into the qualifying draw, she reached the final round where she lost to Anna-Lena Grönefeld, after defeating Olga Govortsova in three sets.

On 22 May 2009, de Brito qualified for her first Grand Slam tournament main draw at the French Open after winning the final round of the qualifying by beating world No. 152, Kristína Kučová, world No. 177, Yuliana Fedak, and world No. 151, Ekaterina Ivanova. She became the first Portuguese female player ever to do so. After overcoming Melanie South in the first round, Larcher de Brito once again made history by becoming the first Portuguese player overall to qualify for the third round of a Grand Slam by beating world No. 15, Zheng Jie. She would lose to home player Aravane Rezaï, a game in which her opponent made a number of complaints about the amount of noise coming from the Portuguese. With her third round result, she entered the top 100 for the first time, a ranking of world No. 90.

After failing to qualify for the Birmingham Classic, where she lost in the second round to Chanelle Scheepers, she received a wildcard to participate in Wimbledon, before winning the Tradition-ICAP Liverpool International, an exhibition tournament, where she beat fellow Wimbledon wildcard Laura Robson in the final. At Wimbledon, she defeated Klára Zakopalová in the first round but fell to world No. 43, Francesca Schiavone, in the second. After the good results in Europe, she returned to the United States to compete on the US Open Series tournaments. However, her results were disappointing, first in Los Angeles, where she received a wildcard, losing to Sorana Cîrstea, then as a qualifier in Cincinnati losing to Yaroslava Shvedova and Toronto against world No. 69, Petra Kvitová.

Following those results it was announced that she signed a three-year deal with the famous Mouratoglou Tennis Academy to prepare herself during the European seasons. At the US Open, Larcher de Brito reached the second round, beating No. 97 Mathilde Johansson, before losing to world No. 19, Li Na. She finished the year by losing to Kirsten Flipkens in the first round of qualifying in Luxembourg.

=== 2010 ===
Playing in the qualifying phase at the Australian Open, Larcher de Brito failed to qualify for a Grand Slam tournament since the previous year's Australian Open, losing in the first qualifying round to Ekaterina Dzehalevich. This was followed by a four-match losing run in the Fed Cup in February (that saw the Portugal relegated to Europe/Africa Group II) and a third successive second round showing in Memphis, losing to Anne Keothavong.

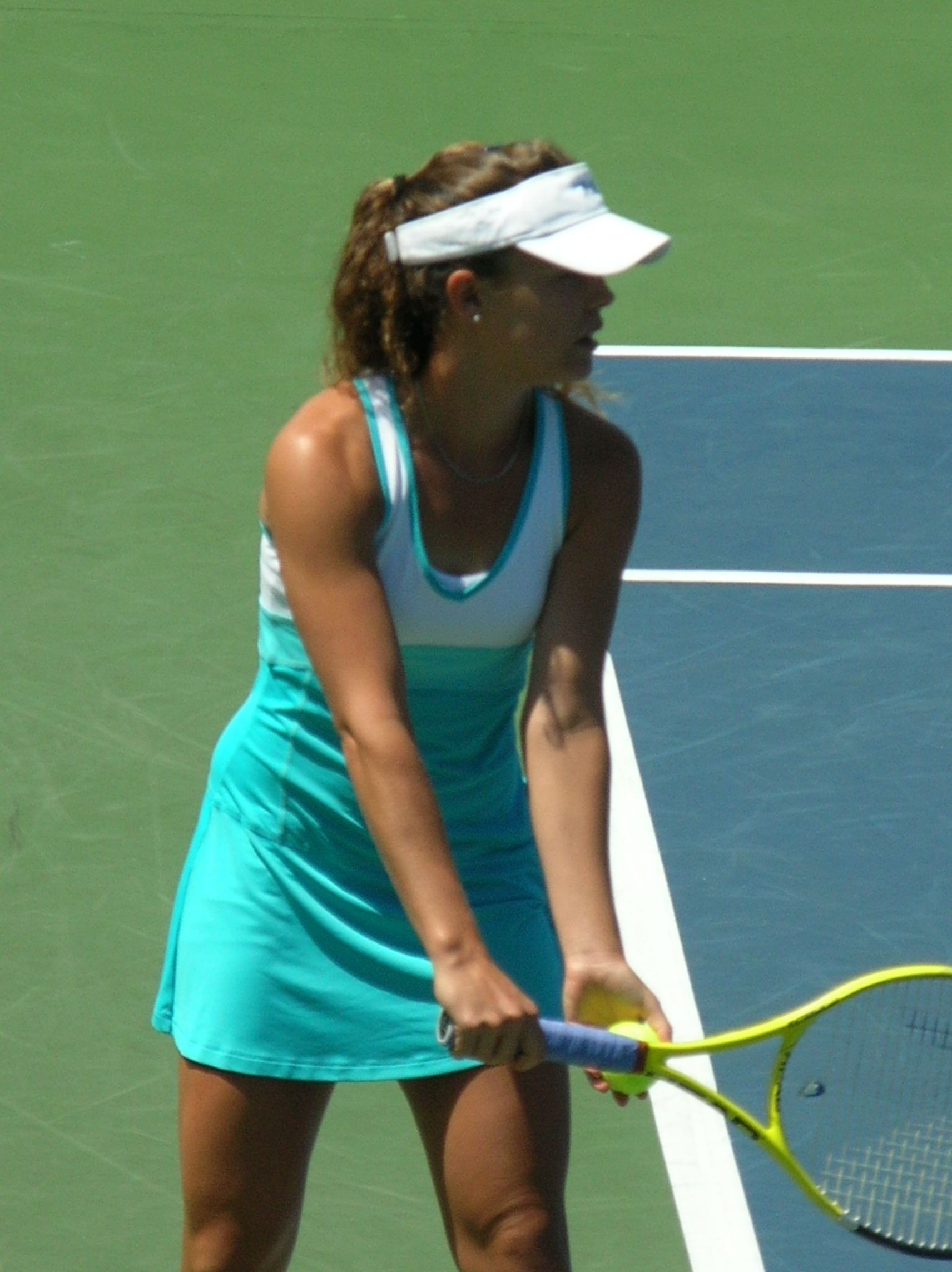
Larcher de Brito at the 2010 Bank of the West Classic

After first round exits at Indian Wells (after she won two qualifying matches against Klára Zakopalová and world No. 115, Arantxa Rus, she lost to Alexandra Dulgheru) and Miami (where she lost to world No. 40, Sorana Cîrstea), she found more success in the clay-court season with second round showings at Charleston (where she lost to Patty Schnyder) and Estoril (after she defeated world No. 71, Alizé Cornet, in the first round, she lost to Sorana Cîrstea). Despite signs of improvement, she failed to qualify to the main draw at the French Open, losing to Misaki Doi in the second qualifying round in three sets.

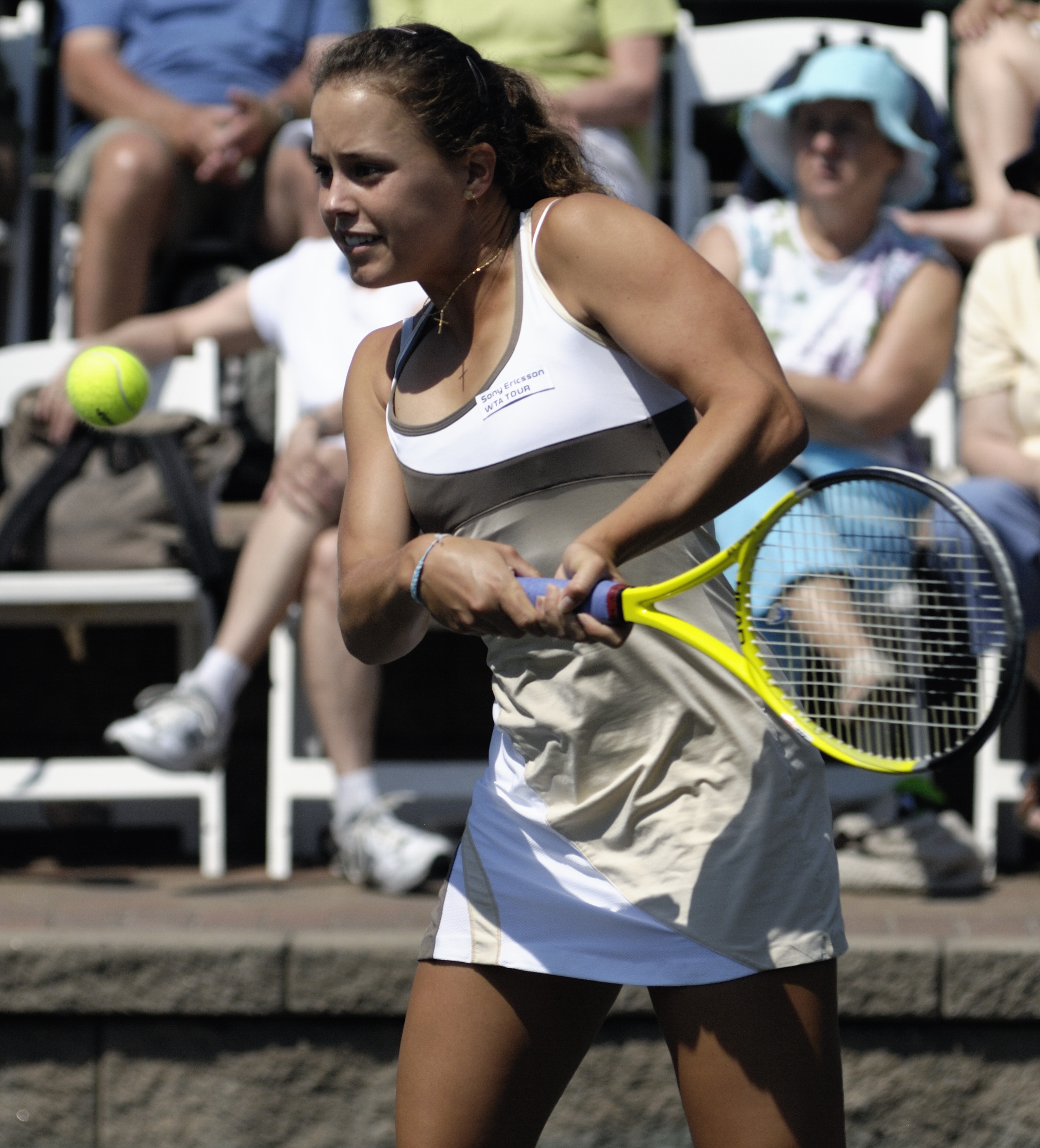
Larcher de Brito at the 2010 Family Circle Cup

In June came her best result of the season, a third round showing in Birmingham, where she lost to Kaia Kanepi, after defeating Ekaterina Dzehalevich and Olga Govortsova in the first two rounds. This was followed with a first round loss at Wimbledon against world No. 1 and eventual champion, Serena Williams. The American hardcourt season also proved to be unsuccessful with failed qualification attempts at Stanford and San Diego and a first round loss at the US Open against world No. 159, Sania Mirza (after she won three qualifying matches against Karolína Plíšková, Anastasiya Yakimova and Alexandra Panova). She finished the year at the $75k event in Albuquerque with another first round, straight set-loss to Daria Gavrilova.

=== 2011 ===
Larcher de Brito started the season by playing in a $25k event in Plantation, losing in the first round to world No. 323, Julia Boserup, in straight sets. She then took part in another $25k event in Lutz, losing in the second round to Jessica Pegula in a close three set-match. At her third event, at the $25k event in Rancho Santa Fe, California, Larcher de Brito won her first career title, beating world No. 189, Madison Brengle, in the final. Afterwards, she took part at the $100k event in Midland, losing in the second round to Ahsha Rolle. In Miami, she lost in the second round of qualifying to the former world junior No. 1, Arantxa Rus, after having defeated Magdaléna Rybáriková in the first round.

In April, at the $50k event in Charlottesville, Virginia, Larcher de Brito lost to Stéphanie Dubois in the final.

In May, she failed to qualify to the main draw at the French Open, losing to world No. 202, Elena Bogdan, in the first qualifying round.

In June, she reached the semifinals of the $75k event in Nottingham, losing to Olga Govortsova in straight sets.

In August, returning from injury, she won in the first round of qualifying for the US Open, beating Lesia Tsurenko in three sets in two hours 51 minutes with an incredible 19 double-faults. In the second round, she defeated world No. 193, Anna Floris, in only 56 minutes. In the third round, she lost to Karin Knapp in a long three-setter.

In September, she won in the second round of qualifying to the Bell Challenge, beating Amra Sadiković. In the third round, she lost to Gail Brodsky.

In October, Larcher de Brito was the third seed at the $25k tournament in Bayamón. In the first round, she defeated Yolima Ogando, in the second Teliana Pereira, in the quarterfinals she beat the No. 5 seed Madison Brengle. In her semifinal against Catalina Castaño, she again won in straight sets to book a final appearance against Monica Puig, winning in straight sets for her second career title.

In November, at the $75k event in Phoenix, Larcher de Brito lost to world No. 175, Sesil Karatantcheva, in the final, after defeating first seed Irina Falconi in the first round and third seed, Mandy Minella, in the semifinals.

=== 2012 ===
Playing in the qualifying phase at the Australian Open, Larcher de Brito won in the first qualifying round to knock out Kathrin Wörle. In the second round, she defeated Arantxa Parra Santonja. In the third round, she lost to the world No. 140, Stefanie Vögele.

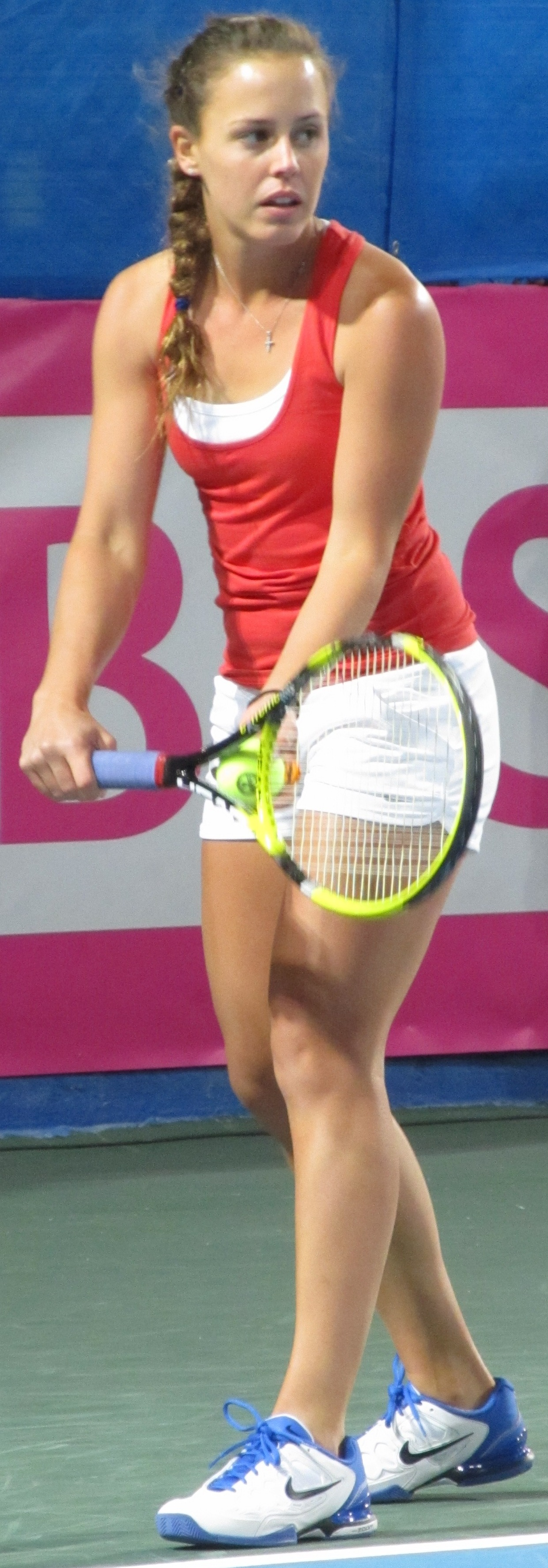
Larcher de Brito at the 2012 Fed Cup in Israel

This was followed by participation in the Fed Cup in February. After a straight sets-loss to Elena Baltacha, Portugal's overall 3–0 loss to Great Britain, Larcher de Brito, 99 places lower than her Israeli opponent Shahar Pe'er, played a solid baseline game and capitalised on the Israeli's errors to register a straight set-thrashing of the home favourite. She also beat Michaëlla Krajicek and Dia Evtimova to help Portugal to achieve fifth place in the Europe/Africa group. After that, at the $25k event in Surprise, Arizona, Larcher de Brito won her third career-title, defeating world No. 172, Claire Feuerstein, in the final.

In April, playing in the qualifying phase at Charleston, Larcher de Brito won in the first qualifying round to Alexandra Stevenson. In the second round, she lost to Karolína Plíšková. A week later, at the $25k event in Pelham, Larcher de Brito lost to the Edina Gallovits-Hall in the semifinals, after defeating the Julia Boserup in the first round and the young Australian Sacha Jones in the quarterfinals.

In May, playing in the qualifying phase at Brussels, Larcher de Brito won in the first qualifying round to Ysaline Bonaventure. In the second round, she lost to the world No. 98, Arantxa Rus. A week later, she failed to qualify to the main draw at the French Open, losing to Tatjana Malek in the first qualifying round.

In June, she reached the second round in the $75k tournament in Nottingham, where she lost to Elena Baltacha, after winning three matches in qualifying and defeating Ayumi Morita in the first round. A week later, playing in the qualifying phase at Birmingham, Larcher de Brito won in the first qualifying round Līga Dekmeijere. In the second round, she defeated Chan Yung-jan and qualified for the tournament main draw. Then she won in the first round, defeating Bojana Jovanovski in three sets. In the second round, she lost to Melanie Oudin. This was followed with a first round victory in the qualifying phase at Wimbledon against Ajla Tomljanović. In the second round, she lost to Karolína Plíšková.

In July, Michelle received a wildcard to the Stanford Classic. In the first round she won eleven straight games from 7–5, 2–0 down and eventually knocked out Jarmila Gajdošová. In the second round, she lost to sixth seed Chanelle Scheepers. A week later, playing in the qualifying phase at the San Diego Open, she beat Julia Boserup in the first round. In the second round she defeated Melanie Oudin and qualified for the tournament main draw. In the first round, she lost to Misaki Doi. This was followed with a first round victory in the qualifying phase at Washington against Alessandra Parra. In the second record she defeated Gabriela Paz and qualified for the tournament main draw. Larcher de Brito battled past Croat Mirjana Lučić-Baroni in a three-set thriller. She also had to endure a short delay because of temperatures rising to unplayable levels, but came out victorious against the German-born Lučić to labour into the second round. She broke her rival's serve twice and jumped to a 5–1 lead. Apart from wasting her chance of serving out the opening set with a breadstick, Larcher de Brito plucked her serve once more and clicked the opener with a 6–3 win. Lučić-Baroni re-focused in the follow-up set and got back in action. She earned the critical break in the fourth game and leaped to a 4–1 lead. The Croat held her remaining serves with poise and sealed the equalizer by winning six games to two. Larcher de Brito regained her strength in the final set, after Lučić-Baroni held her serve in the second game, the Portuguese unleashed her good form and went on a five-game streak, subsequently pulling out the decider with a breadstick. In the second round, she lost to world No. 50, Sloane Stephens.

In August, at the Rogers Cup, Larcher de Brito won the first round of qualifying against Kristina Mladenovic in straight sets. In the second round, she defeated Barbora Záhlavová-Strýcová. In the final round, she defeated Lučić-Baroni to qualify for the main draw. In the first round proper, she lost to Simona Halep. Later, she won the first round of qualifying at the US Open, beating Ekaterina Dzehalevich. She lost, however, to Elina Svitolina in the second round.

In September, she lost in the first round of the Bell Challenge to Petra Rampre. Later, she reached the semifinal at the $75k event in Albuquerque, losing to Maria Sanchez in straight sets despite saving seven match points.

In October, she reached the semifinals of the $25k event in Troy, losing to Sharon Fichman after saving five match points.

=== 2013 ===
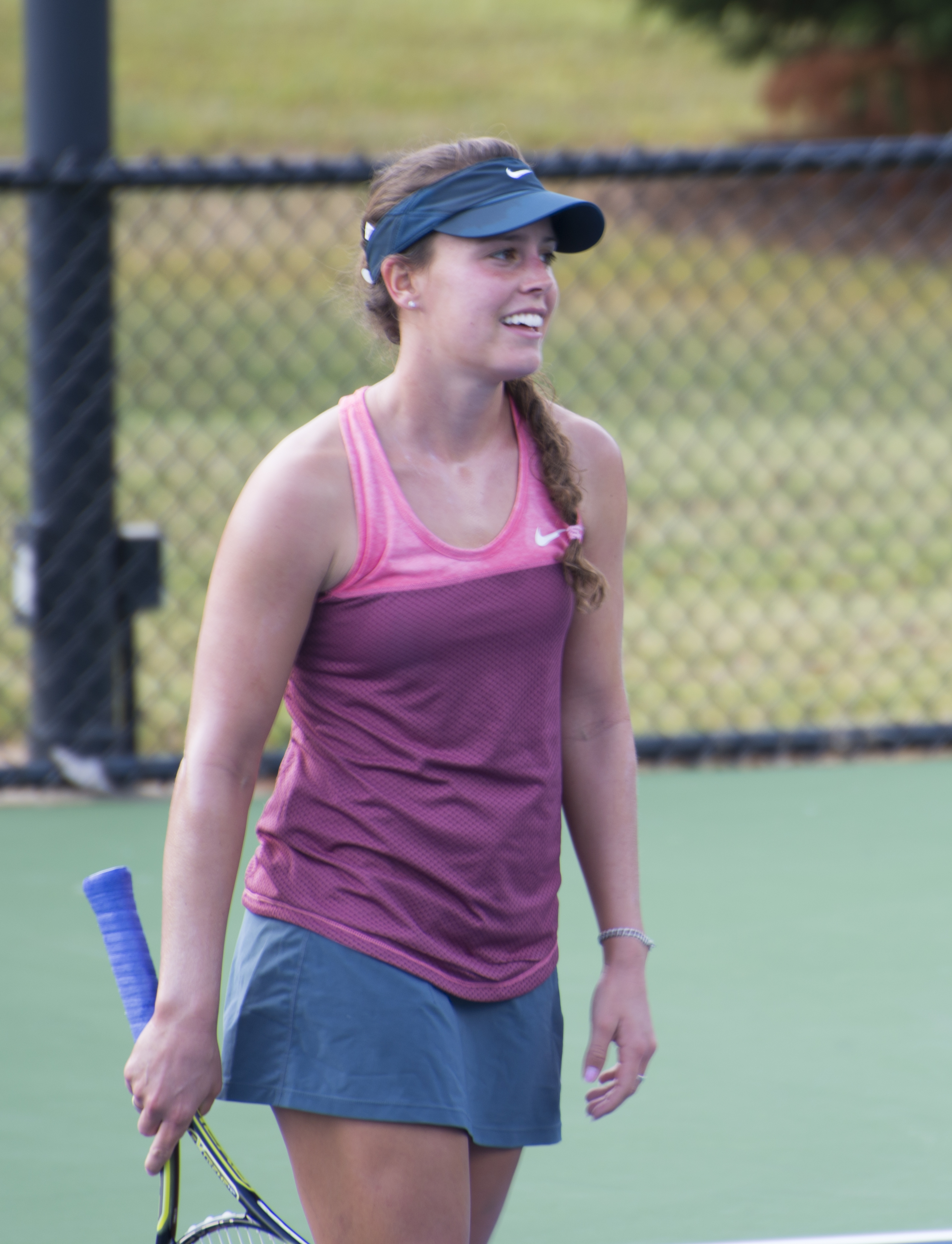
Michelle Larcher de Brito 2013

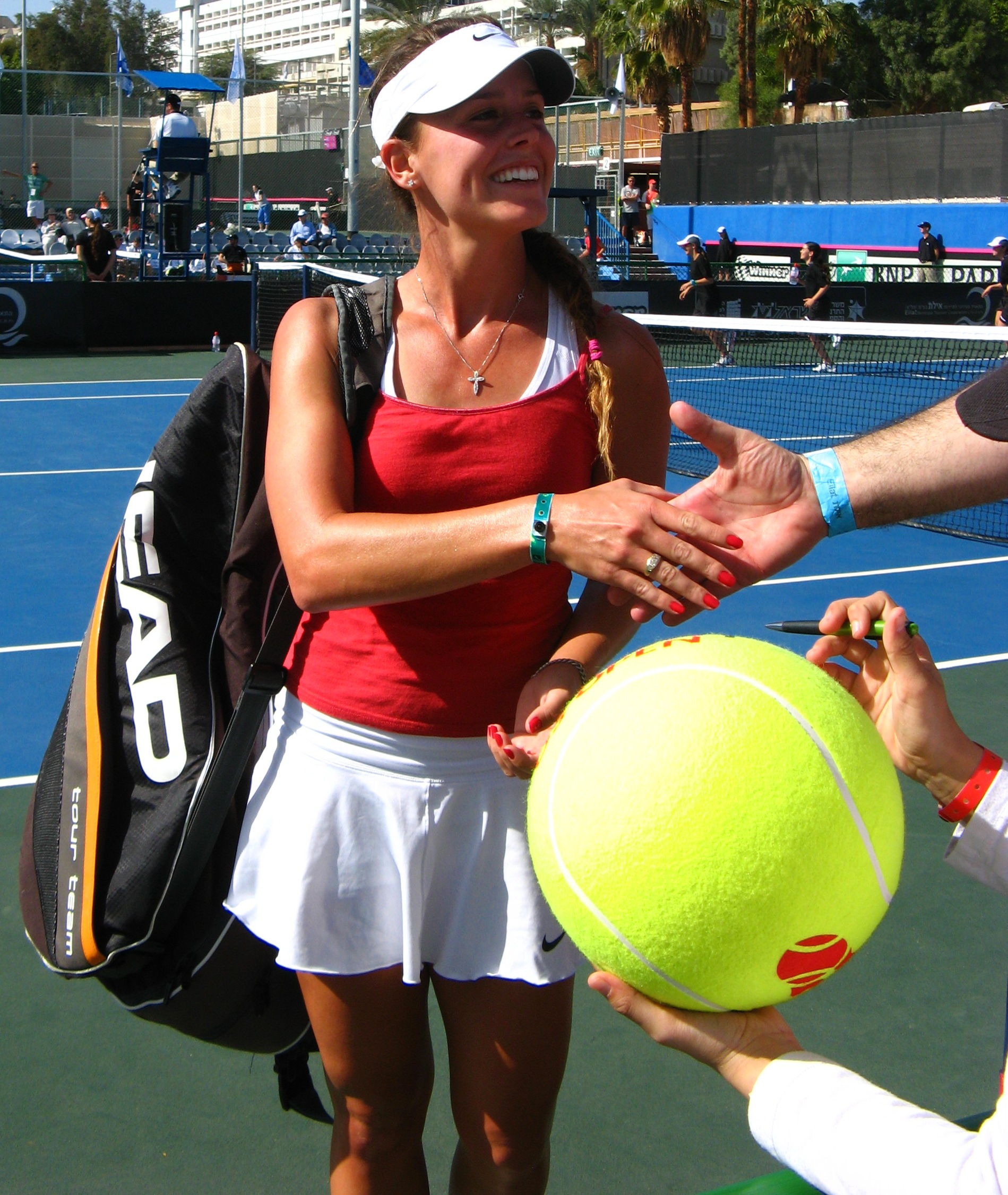
Larcher de Brito at the 2013 Fed Cup in Israel

Playing in the qualifying phase at the Australian Open, Larcher de Brito won in the first qualifying round over Azra Hadzic. In the second round she defeated Cristina Mitu. In the third round, Larcher de Brito needed more than two hours to defeat South Africa's Chanel Simmonds, triumphing in a titanic three set-clash on Court 10 to make her Australian Open main-draw debut. In the first round, she was defeated by 19th seed Ekaterina Makarova in straight sets. This was followed by participation in the Fed Cup in February. After a straight sets-loss to Tímea Babos in Portugal's overall 3–0 loss to Hungary, Michelle defeated Heather Watson. Laura Robson and Heather Watson held their nerve in a deciding doubles rubber against Portugal to secure Great Britain's second victory at the Fed Cup in Israel. Watson and Robson are occasional doubles partners, teaming up at the previous year's Olympic Games, and they easily saw off Larcher de Brito and Joana Valle Costa to earn Britain a 2–1 victory in the tie. In the last round, she defeated Jelena Simić from Bosnia and in doubles with Bárbara Luz they defeated Anita Husarić and Dea Herdželaš with the loss of just one game. This was followed by a loss in the qualifying in Memphis at the hands of world No. 96, Jana Čepelová.

At the qualifying to the Indian Wells Open, Larcher de Brito defeated Misaki Doi in the first round. In the second round, she qualified for the main draw, defeating Anastasia Rodionova. In the first round, she lost to Alexandra Dulgheru, the ex-top-25 player from Romania. Playing in the qualifying phase at the Family Circle Cup, Larcher de Brito won in the first round (Hayley Carter) but lost to Jessica Pegula in the second.

In May, in the qualification to the Brussels Open, Larcher de Brito won in the first qualifying round over Alicja Rosolska. In the second round, she lost to Yulia Putintseva. Later, she failed to qualify to the main draw at the French Open, where she lost in the first round of the qualifying to Maryna Zanevska. In June, playing in the qualifying phase at Birmingham, Larcher de Brito lost in the first qualifying round to Arantxa Parra Santonja. At Wimbledon, she qualified for the main draw by defeating Chanel Simmonds, Claire Feuerstein and Shahar Pe'er. In the first round of the main draw, Larcher de Brito defeated Melanie Oudin in three sets. In the second round, she defeated 2004 champion and world No. 3, Maria Sharapova, in straight sets. In the third round, however, she lost to the unseeded Karin Knapp from Italy.

In July, Larcher de Brito played in the qualifying phase of the Stanford Classic, defeating Julia Boserup in the second round. In the third round she defeated Natalie Grandin and qualified for the main draw where she lost to sixth seed Varvara Lepchenko. Lepchenko nearly let a 6–2, 5–1 lead slip away but eventually closed. The American won the match on her sixth match point. This was followed with a first-round victory in the qualifying phase at Washington against Louisa Chirico. In the second record, she defeated Victoria Duval to qualify for the main draw, but lost here to world No. 40, Madison Keys. A week later, at the Roger's Cup, Larcher de Brito lost in the first round of qualifying to Paula Ormaechea of Argentina.

In August, Larcher de Brito won the first round of US Open qualifying, beating Chiara Scholl. In the second round, she laboured to a three-set victory over Kazakhstani Zarina Diyas. To qualify for the Grand Slam main draw, she defeated Elena Baltacha in three sets. In round one of the main draw, Larcher de Brito defeated world No. 124, Eleni Daniilidou, but lost to Maria Kirilenko in round two.

In September, she lost in the first round of the Bell Challenge to Julie Coin of France. She would contest six more tournaments in the season, playing ITF tournaments in the United States. She was mostly unsuccessful and only advanced to one quarterfinal. She ended the year ranked world No. 109 – her highest season-ending ranking.

=== 2014 ===
Larcher de Brito elected to skip the Australian Open and remain in the United States, where she lost in the first round of an $25k tournament to Aleksandra Wozniak. She then qualified for the main draw in Indian Wells Open, but went down in the first round to Karolína Plíšková. She continued to play in American events until the French Open. Ranked world number 117, she entered the qualifying draw and defeated Aliaksandra Sasnovich, Irina Ramialison, and Allie Kiick for a spot in the main draw. She did, however, lose in the first round to Julia Görges.

She began her grass-court season in Nottingham, where she advanced to the semifinals. Larcher de Brito had lost the first set of her first three matches before coming back to win. Her run was ended in the semifinals by Zarina Diyas in straight sets. At Wimbledon, Larcher de Brito again played qualifying and had little trouble, defeating all three opponents in straight sets. She would then record her season-best win in the main draw, with a three-set win over two-time Grand Slam champion Svetlana Kuznetsova in the first round. She followed it up with another three-set win over Australian wildcard Jarmila Gajdošová, in the second round. She was defeated by Agnieszka Radwańska in the round of 32.

=== 2015 ===
At the Birmingham Classic, as a qualifier, she defeated lucky loser Zheng Saisai in the first round before producing the biggest win of her career by beating world No. 7, Ana Ivanovic, in three sets, before losing to Daniela Hantuchová in the third round. Larcher de Brito only played one other tournament in 2015, in Wimbledon, where she failed to qualify for the main draw.

== Grunting controversy ==
During the 2009 French Open and Wimbledon tournaments, Larcher de Brito came under criticism for what by some was considered excessive grunting. Larcher de Brito's in-game grunts at Wimbledon were recorded at 109 decibels, louder than police sirens and higher than the sound intensity records of other players. Some players and commentators have voiced suspicions that the grunting was used as an unsportsmanlike tactic to distract the opponent and that this tactic was actually taught by Nick Bollettieri, who was responsible for the training of Larcher de Brito and other grunting players.

Michelle Larcher de Brito denied being unsportsmanlike and stated: "Nobody can tell me to stop grunting. Tennis is an individual sport and I'm an individual player. If they have to fine me, go ahead, because I'd rather get fined than lose a match because I had to stop grunting [...] If it has inconvenienced the other player, there's nothing I can really do about it, because I don't really want to change anything. [...] I'm here to win. That's it. If people don't like my grunting they can always leave." On a more conciliatory note, however, Larcher de Brito has also remarked: "I'm 16 and I'm still learning. Maybe I can eventually put it under control. I don't know, but I'll try. It comes from Seles; it comes from Sharapova. It comes from great players." Like Larcher de Brito, Monica Seles and Maria Sharapova were also trained by Nick Bollettieri.

== ITF Circuit finals ==
=== Singles: 7 (4 titles, 3 runner–ups) ===
Legend $100,000 tournaments $75,000 tournaments $50,000 tournaments $25,000 tournaments $15,000 tournaments	Finals by surface Hard (3–2) Clay (1–1) Grass (0–0) Carpet (0–0)

Result	W–L	Date	Tournament	Tier	Surface	Opponent	Score
Win	1–0	Feb 2011	Rancho Santa Fe Open, United States	25,000	Hard	(United States) Madison Brengle	3–6, 6–4, 6–1
Loss	1–1	May 2011	ITF Charlottesville, United States	50,000	Clay	(Canada) Stéphanie Dubois	6–1, 6–7^{(5)}, 1–6
Win	2–1	Oct 2011	ITF Bayamón, Puerto Rico	25,000	Hard	(Puerto Rico) Monica Puig	6–3, 6–2
Loss	2–2	Nov 2011	ITF Phoenix, United States	75,000	Hard	(Bulgaria) Sesil Karatantcheva	1–6, 5–7
Win	3–2	Feb 2012	ITF Surprise, United States	25,000	Hard	(France) Claire Feuerstein	6–1, 6–3
Loss	3–3	Sep 2014	Las Vegas Open, United States	50,000	Hard	(United States) Madison Brengle	1–6, 4–6
Win	4–3	Mar 2017	ITF Tampa, United States	15,000	Clay	(Mexico) Victoria Rodríguez	6–2, 6–0

=== Exhibition ===
==== Singles ====
Result	Date	Tournament	Surface	Opponent	Score
Win	20 June 2009	Tradition-ICAP Liverpool International, UK	Grass	(United Kingdom) Laura Robson	6–4, 2–6, [10–6]

== Singles performance timeline ==
Key
W	F	SF	QF	#R	RR	Q#	DNQ	A	NH

(W) winner; (F) finalist; (SF) semifinalist; (QF) quarterfinalist; (#R) rounds 4, 3, 2, 1; (RR) round-robin stage; (Q#) qualification round; (DNQ) did not qualify; (A) absent; (NH) not held; (SR) strike rate (events won / competed); (W–L) win–loss record.

Tournament	2007	2008	2009	2010	2011	2012	2013	2014	2015	2016	2017	2018	W–L
Grand Slam
Australian Open	A	A	Q2	Q1	A	Q3	1R	A	A	Q3	A	A	0–1
French Open	A	A	3R	Q2	Q1	Q1	Q1	1R	Q1	A	A	A	2–2
Wimbledon	A	Q1	2R	1R	A	Q2	3R	3R	Q2	Q2	Q2		5–4
US Open	A	Q3	2R	1R	Q3	Q2	2R	Q2	A	A	A		2–3
Win–loss	0–0	0–0	4–3	0–2	0–0	0–0	3–3	2–2	0–0	0–0	0–0		9–10
Premier Mandatory tournaments
Indian Wells	A	A	1R	1R	A	A	1R	1R	Q2				0–4
Miami	2R	3R	Q1	1R	Q1	A	A	Q1	Q1				3–3
Madrid	Not held		Q2	Q1	A	A	A						0–0
Beijing	Not PMM		Q1	A	A	A	A						0–0
Win–loss	1–1	2–1	0–1	0–2	0–0	0–0	0–1	0–1	0–0	0–0	0–0		3–7
Premier 5 tournaments
Montreal/Toronto	A	3R	Q1	A	A	1R	Q1						2–2
Cincinnati	Not PM5		Q1	A	A	A	A						0–0
Win–loss	0–0	2–1	0–0	0–0	0–0	0–1	0–0	0–0	0–0	0–0	0–0	0–0	2–2
Career statistics
Tournaments	1	6	7	8	0	6	7						Career total: 35
Statistics by surface
Hard Win–loss	1–1	8–5	4–5	1–8	0–0	5–6	1–6						20–31
Clay win–loss	0–0	0–1	2–2	2–2	3–0	0–0							7–5
Grass win–loss	0–0	0–0	1–1	2–2	0–0	1–1	2–1						6–5
Carpet win–loss	0–0	0–0	0–0	0–0	0–0	0–0							0–0
Overall win–loss	1–1	8–6	7–8	5–12	3–0	6–7	3–7						33–41^{1}
Win (%)	50%	57%	47%	29%	100%	46%	30%						Career Win (%): 45%
Year-end ranking	312	124	114	205	146	130	109						$414,621

If ITF Women's Circuit (hardcourt: 45–26; clay: 13–13; grass: 7–2) and WTA qualifying (hardcourt: 31–17; clay: 9–9; grass: 4–4) participations are included, then her overall win–loss record stands at 139–103.

== Fed Cup ==
Larcher de Brito debuted for the Portugal Fed Cup team in 2009 and helped the team's promotion to the Europe/Africa Group I. The team was relegated back to Group II in 2010 and she helped again in 2011 with the team's promotion to the Europe/Africa Group I with five victories. She has a 18–14 singles record and a 7–9 doubles record (25–23 overall).

=== Fed Cup participation (24) ===
==== Singles (17) ====
Edition	Round	Date	Against	Surface	Opponent	W–L	Result
2009 Fed Cup; Europe/Africa Group II	RR	22–24 April 2009	Morocco	Hard	Fatima El Allami	Win	6–4, 7–5
2009 Fed Cup; Europe/Africa Group II	RR	22–24 April 2009	Latvia	Hard	Anastasija Sevastova	Loss	2–6, 3–6
2009 Fed Cup; Europe/Africa Group II	GII Play-Offs	25 April 2009	South Africa	Hard	Natalie Grandin	Win	6–4, 6–3
2010 Fed Cup; Europe/Africa Group I	RR	3–5 February 2010	Croatia	Hard	Petra Martić	Loss	4–6, 1–6
2010 Fed Cup; Europe/Africa Group I	RR	3–5 February 2010	Switzerland	Hard	Patty Schnyder	Loss	2–6, 4–6
2010 Fed Cup; Europe/Africa Group I	RR	3–5 February 2010	Romania	Hard	Alexandra Dulgheru	Loss	0–6, 7–5, 2–6
2010 Fed Cup; Europe/Africa Group I	GI Play-Offs	6 February 2010	Bulgaria	Hard	Tsvetana Pironkova	Loss	3–6, 3–6
2011 Fed Cup; Europe/Africa Group II	RR	4–6 May 2011	Morocco	Clay	Fatima El Allami	Win	4–6, 6–3, 6–2
2011 Fed Cup; Europe/Africa Group II	RR	4–6 May 2011	Finland	Clay	Emma Laine	Win	7–6^{(3)}, 6–3
2011 Fed Cup; Europe/Africa Group II	GII Play-Offs	7 May 2011	(Georgia (country)) Georgia	Clay	Sofia Shapatava	Win	3–6, 6–4, 7–6^{(6)}
2012 Fed Cup; Europe/Africa Group I	RR	1–3 February 2012	(United Kingdom) Great Britain	Hard	Elena Baltacha	Loss	2–6, 3–6
2012 Fed Cup; Europe/Africa Group I	RR	1–3 February 2012	Israel	Hard	Shahar Pe'er	Win	6–2, 6–1
2012 Fed Cup; Europe/Africa Group I	RR	1–3 February 2012	Netherlands	Hard	Michaëlla Krajicek	Win	6–1, 6–2
2012 Fed Cup; Europe/Africa Group I	GI Play-Offs	4 February 2012	Bulgaria	Hard	Dia Evtimova	Win	6–1, 6–1
2013 Fed Cup; Europe/Africa Group I	RR	7–9 February 2013	Hungary	Hard	Tímea Babos	Loss	6–3, 5–7, 5–7
2013 Fed Cup; Europe/Africa Group I	RR	7–9 February 2013	(United Kingdom) Great Britain	Hard	Heather Watson	Win	6–1, 6–4
2013 Fed Cup; Europe/Africa Group I	RR	7–9 February 2013	Bosnia and Herzegovina	Hard	Jelena Simić	Win	6–3, 3–6, 6–2

==== Doubles (7) ====
Edition	Round	Date	Partnering	Against	Surface	Opponents	W–L	Result
2010 Fed Cup; Europe/Africa Group I	RR	3 February 2010	Neuza Silva	Croatia	Hard	Jelena Kostanić Tošić; Silvia Njirić	Win	7–5, 6–4
2011 Fed Cup; Europe/Africa Group II	RR	4–6 May 2011	Maria João Koehler	Morocco	Clay	Fatima El Allami; Nadia Lalami	Win	6–3, 6–2
2011 Fed Cup; Europe/Africa Group II	RR	4–6 May 2011	Maria Joao Koehler	Finland	Clay	Emma Laine; Piia Suomalainen	Win	6–3, 6–2
2012 Fed Cup; Europe/Africa Group I	RR	1–3 February 2012	Maria João Koehler	(United Kingdom) Great Britain	Hard	Laura Robson; Heather Watson	Loss	5–7, 0–6
2012 Fed Cup; Europe/Africa Group I	RR	1–3 February 2012	Maria João Koehler	Israel	Hard	Shahar Pe'er; Julia Glushko	Win	6–2, 4–6, 6–4
2013 Fed Cup; Europe/Africa Group I	RR	7–9 February 2013	Joana Valle Costa	(United Kingdom) Great Britain	Hard	Laura Robson; Heather Watson	Loss	2–6, 1–6
2013 Fed Cup; Europe/Africa Group I	RR	7–9 February 2013	Bárbara Luz	Bosnia and Herzegovina	Hard	Anita Husarić; Dea Herdželaš	Win	6–1, 6–0

== Top-10 wins ==
#	Player	Rank	Event	Surface	Round	Score
2013
1.	(Russia) Maria Sharapova	No. 3	Wimbledon, UK	Grass	2R	6–3, 6–4
2015
2.	(Serbia) Ana Ivanovic	No. 7	Birmingham, UK	Grass	2R	6–4, 3–6, 7–6^{(6)}

Awards
Preceded by Vanessa Fernandes	Portuguese Sportswoman of the Year; 2009	Succeeded by Telma Monteiro
Sporting positions
Preceded by (Austria) Nikola Hofmanova	Orange Bowl Girls' Singles Champion; Category: 18 and under 2007	Succeeded by (United States) Julia Boserup
