= Portugal Billie Jean King Cup team =

National tennis team

Portugal
- Captain: Neuza Silva
- ITF ranking: 42 ▲1 (14 November 2016)
- Colors: red & white
- First year: 1968
- Years played: 33
- Ties played (W–L): 108 (47–60)
- Years in World Group: 6 (0–6)
- Best finish: World Group 2R (1968)
- Most total wins: Sofia Prazeres (30–19)
- Most singles wins: Michelle Larcher de Brito (18–14)
- Most doubles wins: Ana Catarina Nogueira (16–5)
- Best doubles team: Ana Catarina Nogueira / Neuza Silva (5–1); Angela Cardoso / Ana Catarina Nogueira (5–2); Joana Pedroso / Sofia Prazeres (5–5)
- Most ties played: Ana Catarina Nogueira (36)
- Most years played: Ana Catarina Nogueira (11)

The Portugal Billie Jean King Cup team represents Portugal in the Billie Jean King Cup tennis competition and are governed by the Federação Portuguesa de Ténis. They competed in the Europe/Africa Zone of Group II in 2011, but were promoted to Group I for 2012.

== History ==
Portugal competed in its first Fed Cup in 1968. Their best result was finishing fifth overall in the Europe/Africa Zone Group I in 2012.

== Players ==
Name	Years	First	Ties	Win/Loss		
Name	Years	First	Ties	Singles	Doubles	Total
Maria Paula Abreu	1	1983	1	–	0–1	0–1
Patrícia Alvarenga	1	1979	1	0–1	0–1	0–2
Maria-Carmen Arnoso	1	1968	1	–	0–1	0–1
Peggy Brixhe	1	1968	1	0–1	0–1	0–2
Manuel Maria Cabral Lencastre	3	1977	4	–	0–4	0–4
Angela Cardoso	4	1999	14	3–3	6–6	9–9
Graça Cardoso	1	1977	2	0–2	0–2	0–4
Cláudia Cianci	1	2019	1	–	0–1	0–1
Cristina Correia	3	1998	7	1–4	1–4	2–8
Manuela Costa	2	1995	5	–	3–2	3–2
Tânia Couto	2	1991	8	3–5	4–1	7–6
Magali de Lattre	4	2005	12	3–5	1–3	4–8
Deborah Fiúza	2	1979	5	1–4	1–3	2–7
Maria Inês Fonte	2	2019	6	0–4	1–3	1–7
Ana Gaspar	2	1996	6	5–1	–	5–1
Francisca Jorge	4	2017	14	5–6	1–8	6–14
Matilde Jorge	1	2021	2	–	1–1	1–1
Maria João Koehler	8	2008	24	6–13	5–7	11–20
Michelle Larcher de Brito	9	2009	32	18–14	7–9	25–23
Bárbara Luz	4	2012	9	0–3	2–6	2–9
Margarida Moura	2	2012	3	0–1	0–2	0–3
Inês Murta	6	2014	11	1–5	1–4	2–9
Ana Catarina Nogueira	11	1997	36	6–19	16–5	22–24
Joana Pedroso	5	1993	18	7–7	9–7	16–14
Leonora Peralta	4	1978	6	0–6	1–4	1–10
Frederica Piedade	7	2001	15	9–2	3–2	12–4
Carlota Plantier Santos	1	2005	2	1–0	0–1	1–1
Conceição Posser	1	1977	2	0–2	–	0–2
Sofia Prazeres	8	1991	30	17–13	13–6	30–19
Conceição Rio	1	1978	1	0–1	–	0–1
Katia Rodrigues	1	1999	1	–	0–1	0–1
Fátima Santiago	2	1983	4	0–4	0–3	0–7
Ana Filipa Santos	1	2019	3	1–2	–	1–2
Neuza Silva	8	2002	23	9–6	9–3	18–9
Joana Valle Costa	1	2013	3	0–1	0–2	0–3
Marta Varanda	2	1983	4	0–4	0–4	0–8
Helga Vieira	1	2000	3	1–1	0–1	2–1
Rita Vilaça	1	2017	2	–	0–2	0–2

== See also ==
- Billie Jean King Cup
- Portugal Davis Cup team
- Portuguese Tennis Federation
