= 2013 Giro d'Italia, Stage 12 to Stage 21 =

Cycling race stages

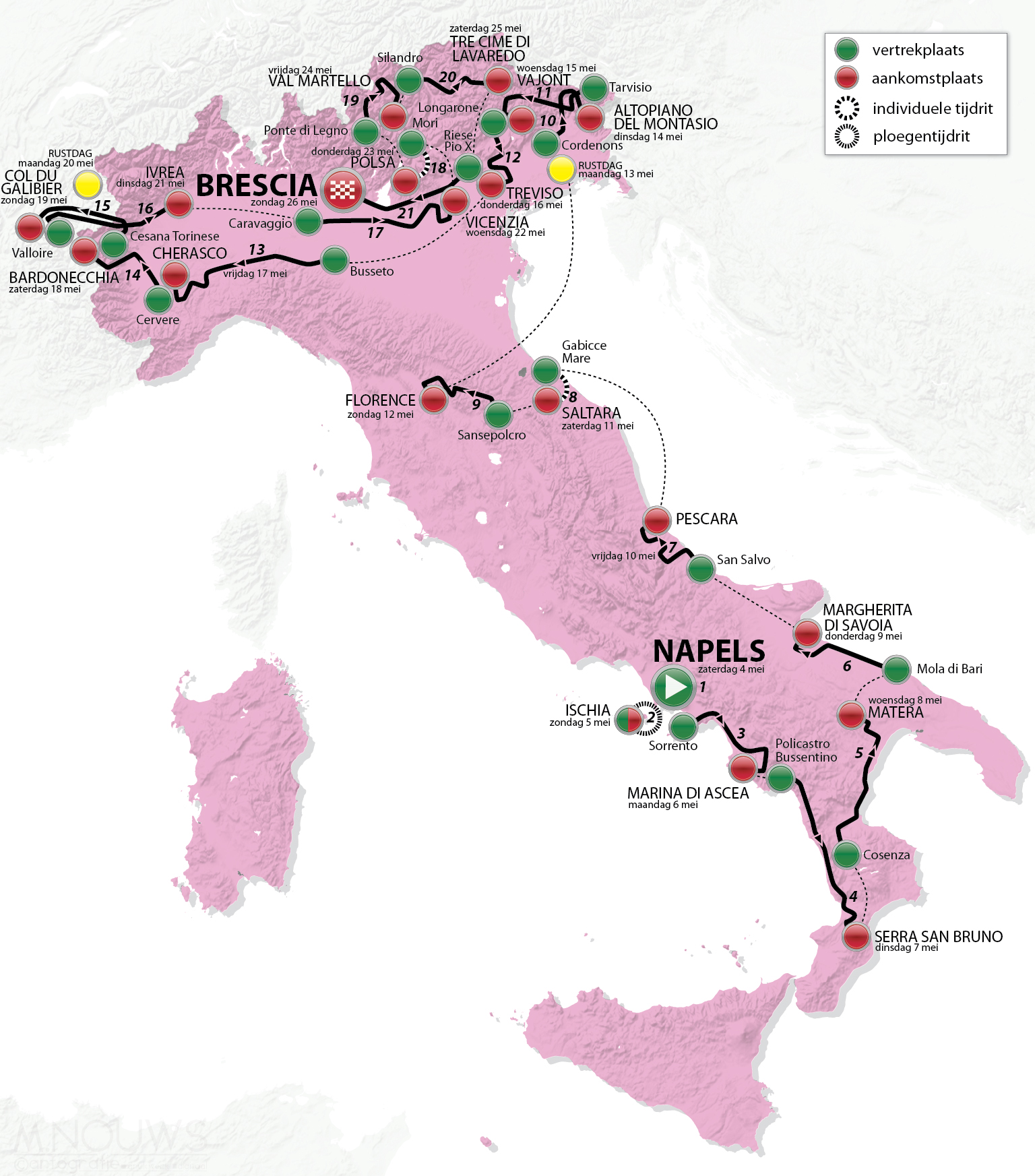
Overview of the stages; black lines represent distances covered in the individual stages, while black dotted lines are the distances covered in transfers between the stages.

Stage 12 of the 2013 Giro d'Italia was contested on 16 May, and the race concluded on 26 May. The second half of the race was almost entirely situated within Italy; it started with a categorised flat stage from Longarone to Treviso, before four mountain stages – as well as a mountainous individual time trial between Mori and Polsa – en route to the finish in Brescia, where the race concluded with a road stage for the first time since 2007. The race also crossed over into France during the fifteenth stage, ending with a summit finish on the Col du Galibier. After the second rest day of the race, the peloton returned to Italy in the following stage, from Valloire in France to Ivrea.

Having picked up the overall race lead after the eighth stage, Astana rider Vincenzo Nibali was able to hold onto the race leadership for the entire second half of the Giro, and as a result, achieved the second Grand Tour general classification victory of his career; he had previously won the 2010 Vuelta a España for the Liquigas–Doimo team. Nibali held a 41-second lead margin over BMC Racing Team's Cadel Evans until the fourteenth stage, when Nibali attacked on the final climb to the Monte Jafferau outside Bardonecchia, and was able to gain 45 seconds on Evans by finishing second to Vini Fantini–Selle Italia's Mauro Santambrogio. Nibali later won two stages during the final week of the race, further extending his overall advantage, and eventually completed the race with a winning margin of close to five minutes. Evans was unable to hold onto second place overall, as he faded on the final climb of the race to Tre Cime di Lavaredo; he ultimately finished third overall behind Team Sky rider Rigoberto Urán, who had become his squad's leader after Bradley Wiggins was forced to withdraw.

Aside from the overall race battle, Mark Cavendish was able to avenge his close defeat in the points classification at the 2012 race – where he lost the red jersey by a single point to Team Katusha rider Joaquim Rodríguez – by taking the classification on the final day in Brescia. The Omega Pharma–Quick-Step rider's victory in Brescia, his fifth of the race – he achieved three in the second half of the race, with other victories on stages 12 and 13 – allowed him to become only the fifth rider to complete a clean sweep of points classification victories at Grand Tours. Giovanni Visconti was another rider to take multiple victories during the second half of the race, taking solo victories at the Col du Galibier and into Vicenza. The second half of the race was also adversely affected by snow, with three stages being re-routed and a fourth having to be cancelled due to heavy snow and treacherous conditions; the cancelled stage was the first due to weather since the 1989 Giro d'Italia.

Legend (Note: Jerseys appearing in the table on the left of the page indicate those worn by the cyclist during the particular stage, while those appearing in the table on the right of the page indicate those awarded to the cyclist after the stage.)
A pink jersey	Denotes the leader of the General classification	A blue jersey	Denotes the leader of the Mountains classification
A red jersey	Denotes the leader of the Points classification	A white jersey	Denotes the leader of the Young rider classification
	s.t. indicates that the rider crossed the finish line in the same group as the one receiving the time above him, and was therefore credited with the same finishing time.		

== Stage 12 ==
16 May 2013 — Longarone to Treviso, 134 km (83.3 mi)

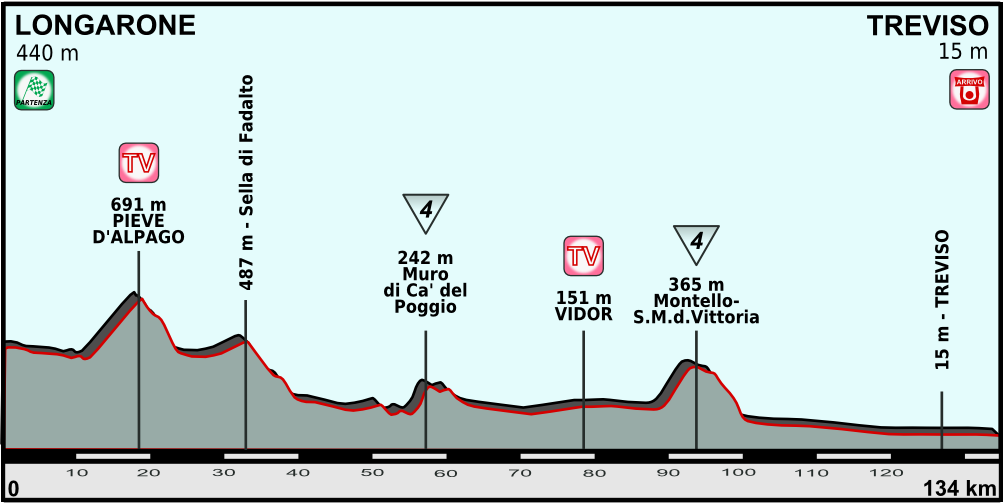

The second half of the race started with a stage ideally favoured towards the sprinters; with a parcours of 134 km (83.3 mi) – one of the shortest of the race – the stage was predominantly downhill from the start in Longarone, all the way to the finish in Treviso. Along the course, there were two fourth-category climbs alternating with the two intermediate sprint points – coming in the comunes of Pieve d'Alpago and Vidor respectively – within the opening two-thirds of the stage. The two categorised climbs were short and punchy; the Muro di Cà del Poggio averaged 12.2% over 1,200 metres (3,900 ft), while the Montello-Santa Maria della Vittoria ascented at an average of 6.3% over 3 km (1.9 mi). Once the riders reached Treviso, they completed a 7.5 km (4.7 mi) loop around the city; the final metres involved the crossing of a bridge, before the line on the Viale Bartolomeo Burchiellati.

Wet conditions awaited the riders in Longarone, where the breakaway was initiated almost immediately after the start, with a four-rider move going clear. The breakaway was made up of ninth stage winner Maxim Belkov (Team Katusha), Androni Giocattoli–Venezuela rider Fabio Felline, Bert De Backer of Argos–Shimano and Vacansoleil–DCM's Maurits Lammertink. Lammertink's team-mate Marco Marcato bridged the gap not long after, to make it a quintet. With a lead of nearly three-and-a-half minutes, all bar De Backer fell in the treacherous conditions, but were able to get back on their bikes not long after. The sprinters' teams slowly brought the lead group back, holding a 25-second lead going into the final loop around Treviso; the quintet managed to hold off until inside the final kilometre.

From there, the Omega Pharma–Quick-Step lead-out train swooped to the front, with Gert Steegmans providing the perfect launch for Mark Cavendish to take his third stage win of the race, and what was to be the 100th win of his professional career. Astana's Vincenzo Nibali maintained his 41-second overall lead ahead of the BMC Racing Team's Cadel Evans. Further behind, Team Sky rider Bradley Wiggins suffered the most notable time loss during the stage. With no fewer than four team-mates around him, Wiggins lost 3' 17" on the day to the main group, falling out of the top ten overall. Wiggins attributed his lack of performance to an ever-worsening medical ailment; he had been taking antibiotics due to him suffering from a cold and chest infection. Due to this, Team Sky general manager Dave Brailsford stated that the team would now be backing Rigoberto Urán, lying third overall, as their best hope of winning the race.

Stage 12 result

	Rider	Team	Time
1	Mark Cavendish (GBR)	Omega Pharma–Quick-Step	3h 01' 47"
2	Nacer Bouhanni (FRA)	FDJ	s.t.
3	Luka Mezgec (SLO)	Argos–Shimano	s.t.
4	Giacomo Nizzolo (ITA)	RadioShack–Leopard	s.t.
5	Brett Lancaster (AUS)	Orica–GreenEDGE	s.t.
6	Manuel Belletti (ITA)	Ag2r–La Mondiale	s.t.
7	Roberto Ferrari (ITA)	Lampre–Merida	s.t.
8	Sacha Modolo (ITA)	Bardiani Valvole–CSF Inox	s.t.
9	Ioannis Tamouridis (GRE)	Euskaltel–Euskadi	s.t.
10	Francisco Ventoso (ESP)	Movistar Team	s.t.

General classification after stage 12

	Rider	Team	Time
1	Vincenzo Nibali (ITA)	Astana	46h 28' 14"
2	Cadel Evans (AUS)	BMC Racing Team	+ 41"
3	Rigoberto Urán (COL)	Team Sky	+ 2' 04"
4	Robert Gesink (NED)	Blanco Pro Cycling	+ 2' 12"
5	Michele Scarponi (ITA)	Lampre–Merida	+ 2' 13"
6	Mauro Santambrogio (ITA)	Vini Fantini–Selle Italia	+ 2' 55"
7	Przemysław Niemiec (POL)	Lampre–Merida	+ 3' 35"
8	Beñat Intxausti (ESP)	Movistar Team	+ 4' 05"
9	Domenico Pozzovivo (ITA)	Ag2r–La Mondiale	+ 4' 17"
10	Rafał Majka (POL)	Saxo–Tinkoff	+ 4' 21"

== Stage 13 ==
17 May 2013 — Busseto to Cherasco, 254 km (157.8 mi)

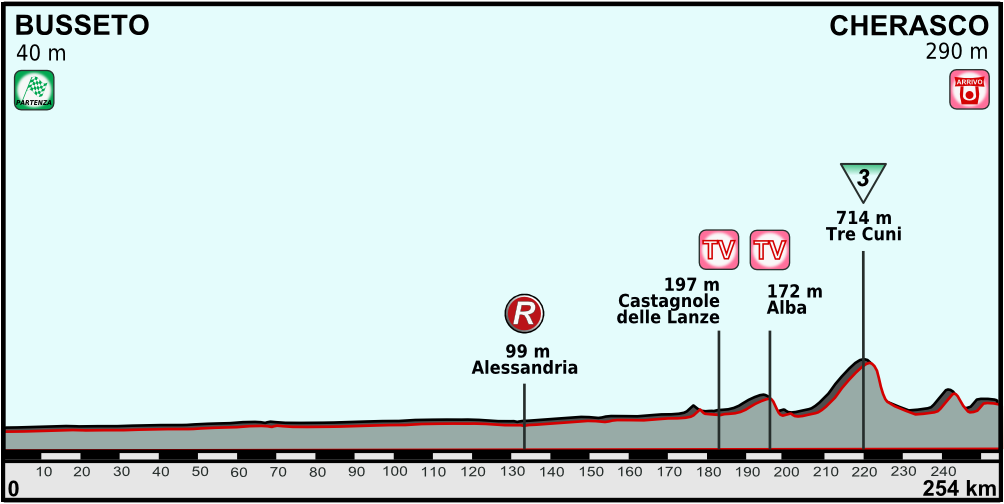

At 254 km (157.8 mi), the thirteenth stage was also the longest stage of the 2013 Giro d'Italia. The parcours, which ran through six different regions, was flat from the start to around the 175 km (108.7 mi) point. From there, there were several uncategorised hills on the route, passing through the two intermediate sprint points – which were competed at the comunes of Castagnole delle Lanze and Alba respectively – before reaching the day's only categorised climb. The third-category Tre Cuni was seen as a potential danger for the sprinters – ahead of the finish in Cherasco – with a gradual rolling climb of around 5% over 10 km (6.2 mi). From there, the riders descended towards the finish with several rolling hills in between; the expectations were still there for a sprint finish, but not a certainty. Prior to the start of the stage, former contenders for the overall classification, Bradley Wiggins (Team Sky) and Ryder Hesjedal (Garmin–Sharp) both withdrew from the race.

A seven-rider group broke away from the peloton after around 20 km (12.4 mi) of racing, and with no potential contenders for the overall classification, the main field allowed the breakaway members to build up a lead of almost fourteen minutes at one point during the stage. With the main contenders unwilling to pull the gap back, it was left to the teams of the sprinters to set the pace; they did so gradually, with the leaders holding an advantage of just over a minute before the climb to Tre Cuni, around 40 km (24.9 mi) from the finish. On the climb, Bardiani Valvole–CSF Inox's Nicola Boem initiated the first attack, and was joined by Pablo Lastras of the Movistar Team and Lars Bak (Lotto–Belisol), with the trio pulling clear of the remaining four members of the lead group. A small group attacked the peloton behind, but after several kilometres off the front of the bunch, this group was pulled back, leaving the three leaders around thirty seconds clear.

Omega Pharma–Quick-Step – looking to set up Mark Cavendish for a fourth stage win at the race – were stationed at the front of the peloton, and slowed the pace of the chase, and allowed the lead trio to gain several seconds of an advantage, pushing the lead out to almost a minute. Boem was dropped shortly after, while Lastras and Bak were joined by another group of riders, with seven going clear from the peloton. From the group, Giampaolo Caruso (Team Katusha) attacked with 6.5 km (4.0 mi) remaining, but his solo bid for victory was stopped with 1.5 km (0.9 mi) left. Cannondale led the field into the final kilometre for Elia Viviani, but Cavendish was first to launch his sprint, and was able to hold off the rest, just edging out Giacomo Nizzolo of RadioShack–Leopard on the line. With his fourth victory of the race, Cavendish became the sixth rider to win 40 Grand Tour stages, and the first rider to take successive Giro stages since Alessandro Petacchi in 2009.

Stage 13 result

	Rider	Team	Time
1	Mark Cavendish (GBR)	Omega Pharma–Quick-Step	6h 09' 55"
2	Giacomo Nizzolo (ITA)	RadioShack–Leopard	s.t.
3	Luka Mezgec (SLO)	Argos–Shimano	s.t.
4	Brett Lancaster (AUS)	Orica–GreenEDGE	s.t.
5	Elia Viviani (ITA)	Cannondale	s.t.
6	Manuel Belletti (ITA)	Ag2r–La Mondiale	s.t.
7	Daniele Bennati (ITA)	Saxo–Tinkoff	s.t.
8	Filippo Pozzato (ITA)	Lampre–Merida	s.t.
9	Anthony Roux (FRA)	FDJ	s.t.
10	Miguel Ángel Rubiano (COL)	Androni Giocattoli–Venezuela	s.t.

General classification after stage 13

	Rider	Team	Time
1	Vincenzo Nibali (ITA)	Astana	52h 38' 09"
2	Cadel Evans (AUS)	BMC Racing Team	+ 41"
3	Rigoberto Urán (COL)	Team Sky	+ 2' 04"
4	Robert Gesink (NED)	Blanco Pro Cycling	+ 2' 12"
5	Michele Scarponi (ITA)	Lampre–Merida	+ 2' 13"
6	Mauro Santambrogio (ITA)	Vini Fantini–Selle Italia	+ 2' 55"
7	Przemysław Niemiec (POL)	Lampre–Merida	+ 3' 35"
8	Beñat Intxausti (ESP)	Movistar Team	+ 4' 05"
9	Domenico Pozzovivo (ITA)	Ag2r–La Mondiale	+ 4' 17"
10	Rafał Majka (POL)	Saxo–Tinkoff	+ 4' 21"

== Stage 14 ==
18 May 2013 — Cervere to Bardonecchia, 180 km (111.8 mi)

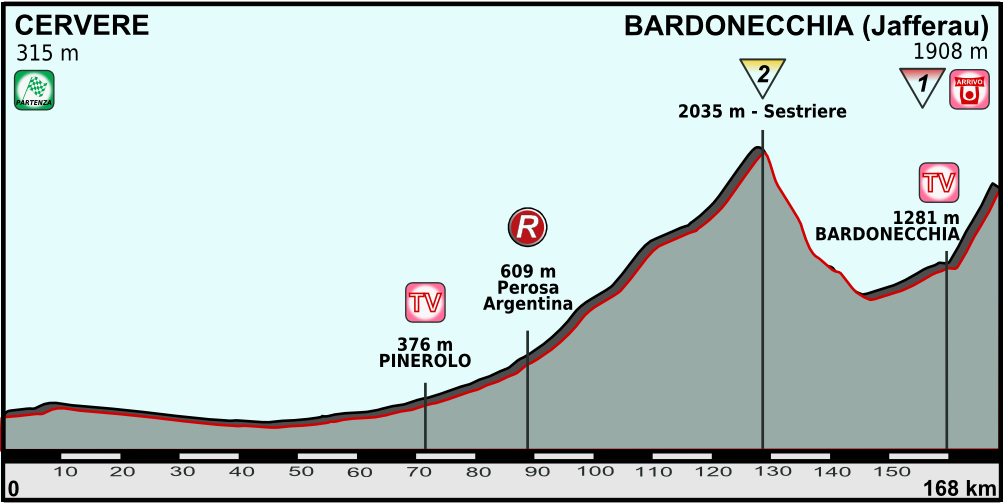

Originally due to be held over a parcours of 168 km (104.4 mi), the fourteenth stage was altered on the morning of the stage, due to bad weather, which also precluded televised live pictures of the race for all but the final few hundred metres. The originally-scheduled climb to Sestriere, a second-category gradual ascent, was removed from the itinerary, with the peloton being re-routed along roads in the Susa Valley to Oulx. The race rejoined the original itinerary at Oulx; in total, 12 km (7.5 mi) was added to the stage distance. From there, the parcours rose to steadily to an intermediate sprint at Bardonecchia, before the climb to the finish on the Jafferau. A first-category climb for its third appearance in the Giro, the Jafferau averaged a 9% gradient over 7.3 km (4.5 mi), with places reaching 14% and portions of the climb being run on unsurfaced roads.

A group of seven riders went clear after around 14 km (8.7 mi) of racing, but this was quickly reduced to four, as three riders fell on wet roads. When they had recovered to the main field, the lead group started to increase their advantage. The all-Italian group – former race leader Luca Paolini (Team Katusha), Daniele Pietropolli of Lampre–Merida, Bardiani Valvole–CSF Inox rider Sonny Colbrelli and Omega Pharma–Quick-Step's Matteo Trentin – were able to extend their advantage to almost ten minutes at one point before the peloton started to bring them back. As the race moved towards the Jafferau, Team Sky took up station on the front of the peloton, slimming the numbers in the main group. Before the final climb, Trentin was dropped by his three companions, and was soon caught by the main field on the climb.

The leaders held a lead of around four minutes at the foot, at which point, Colbrelli attacked. Only Paolini could stay with him, as they set about trying to hold off the front. Sergio Henao (Team Sky) attacked halfway up the climb, where he was joined by Diego Rosa of Androni Giocattoli–Venezuela; Rosa's move was the precursor of an attack by his team captain Franco Pellizotti. Pellizotti caught the duo, and soon set off alone after the leaders, pulling within two minutes before being caught. Paolini dropped Colbrelli with around 1.5 km (0.9 mi) remaining, and held a 43-second lead over the fast-closing chasers. After Paolini was caught, maglia rosa wearer Vincenzo Nibali attacked for Astana, pulling Vini Fantini–Selle Italia's Mauro Santambrogio with him. The two remained clear until the end, with Santambrogio taking the stage win, his first in a Grand Tour. Nibali finished close behind, to extend his overall lead to 1' 26" over BMC Racing Team's Cadel Evans, with Santambrogio moving into fourth overall, one second behind Rigoberto Urán of Team Sky.

Stage 14 result

	Rider	Team	Time
1	Mauro Santambrogio (ITA)	Vini Fantini–Selle Italia	4h 42' 55"
2	Vincenzo Nibali (ITA)	Astana	s.t.
3	Carlos Betancur (COL)	Ag2r–La Mondiale	+ 9"
4	Samuel Sánchez (ESP)	Euskaltel–Euskadi	+ 26"
5	Rigoberto Urán (COL)	Team Sky	+ 30"
6	Cadel Evans (AUS)	BMC Racing Team	+ 33"
7	Domenico Pozzovivo (ITA)	Ag2r–La Mondiale	+ 33"
8	Robert Kišerlovski (CRO)	RadioShack–Leopard	+ 33"
9	Sonny Colbrelli (ITA)	Bardiani Valvole–CSF Inox	+ 55"
10	Damiano Caruso (ITA)	Cannondale	+ 58"

General classification after stage 14

	Rider	Team	Time
1	Vincenzo Nibali (ITA)	Astana	57h 20' 52"
2	Cadel Evans (AUS)	BMC Racing Team	+ 1' 26"
3	Rigoberto Urán (COL)	Team Sky	+ 2' 46"
4	Mauro Santambrogio (ITA)	Vini Fantini–Selle Italia	+ 2' 47"
5	Michele Scarponi (ITA)	Lampre–Merida	+ 3' 53"
6	Przemysław Niemiec (POL)	Lampre–Merida	+ 4' 55"
7	Domenico Pozzovivo (ITA)	Ag2r–La Mondiale	+ 5' 02"
8	Rafał Majka (POL)	Saxo–Tinkoff	+ 5' 32"
9	Carlos Betancur (COL)	Ag2r–La Mondiale	+ 5' 39"
10	Beñat Intxausti (ESP)	Movistar Team	+ 5' 41"

== Stage 15 ==
19 May 2013 — Cesana Torinese to Les Granges du Galibier (France), 145 km (90.1 mi)

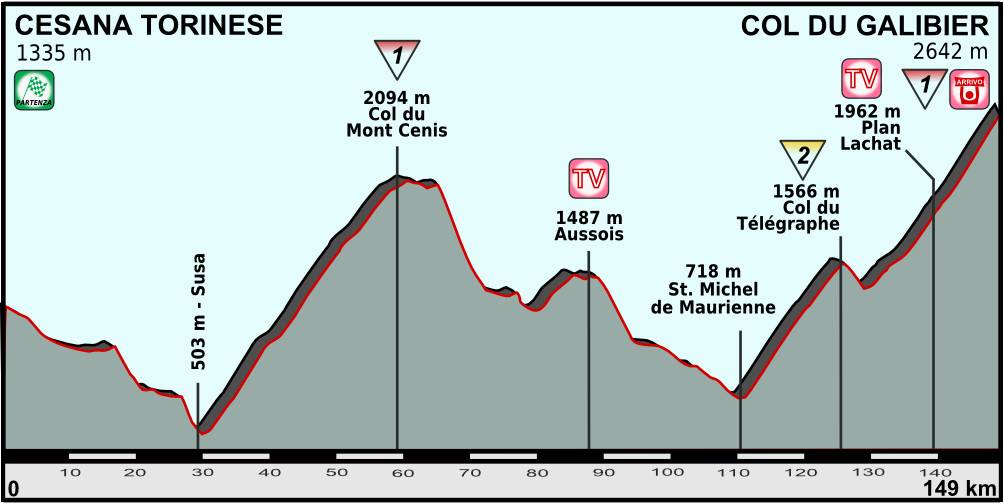

Originally due to be held over a parcours of 149 km (92.6 mi), the stage was slightly shortened due to snow on the Col du Galibier. The snow forced organisers to move the stage finish further down the climb, to the memorial in honour of Marco Pantani. Pantani soloed to a stage victory after attacking on the Col du Galibier during the 1998 Tour de France, before winning at Les Deux Alpes; the catalyst to his overall victory in the race. At one point, both the Col du Galibier and the day's opening climb, the Col du Mont Cenis, were reportedly off the itinerary due to the atmospherical conditions, but both were eventually ascended during the stage. The first-category Col du Mont Cenis climb started in Italy, and crossed over into France with a gradual 25.7 km (16.0 mi)-long climb, averaging around 6.2%, before the race descended down towards Saint-Michel-de-Maurienne, and the start of the second-category Col du Télégraphe. The Col du Télégraphe averaged 7.2% over nearly 12 km (7.5 mi), although reaching 11% in places. After a slight descent to Valloire, the Col du Galibier ascent commenced, with almost 14 km (8.7 mi) covered before the finish.

With continued uncertainty about the safety of the Col du Mont Cenis, racing was neutralised until near the top of the ascent, where mountains classification leader Stefano Pirazzi (Bardiani Valvole–CSF Inox) attacked with Colombia's Robinson Chalapud. The duo were joined on the descent by five more riders as the peloton allowed them to gain a lead of over two minutes. Orica–GreenEDGE rider Pieter Weening soon went off the front on his own, but could not force the pace by himself and soon fell back to rejoin the rest of the breakaway. The group held a maximum lead of over six minutes, but it was around a third of that by the time they reached the Col du Télégraphe. Pirazzi and Weening were strongest in the early kilometres, before Giovanni Visconti (Movistar Team) and Vini Fantini–Selle Italia's Matteo Rabottini were able to join back up with them. Visconti dropped his breakaway companions with around 23 km (14.3 mi) remaining, setting off on a solo effort. Rabottini tried to chase him on the descent from the Télégraphe, but ultimately, Visconti soloed to his first Grand Tour stage win. Rabottini's resolve lasted until inside the final kilometre when he cracked, and allowed a group of four riders to do battle for second. Ag2r–La Mondiale's Carlos Betancur won the sprint for second place ahead of Lampre–Merida's Przemysław Niemiec, and Rafał Majka of Saxo–Tinkoff; with the 12 seconds on offer for second, Betancur moved into the white jersey as young rider leader, ahead of Majka. The overall contenders group came across the line 54 seconds down on Visconti.

Stage 15 result

	Rider	Team	Time
1	Giovanni Visconti (ITA)	Movistar Team	4h 40' 48"
2	Carlos Betancur (COL)	Ag2r–La Mondiale	+ 42"
3	Przemysław Niemiec (POL)	Lampre–Merida	+ 42"
4	Rafał Majka (POL)	Saxo–Tinkoff	+ 42"
5	Fabio Duarte (COL)	Colombia	+ 47"
6	Michele Scarponi (ITA)	Lampre–Merida	+ 54"
7	Vincenzo Nibali (ITA)	Astana	+ 54"
8	Cadel Evans (AUS)	BMC Racing Team	+ 54"
9	Mauro Santambrogio (ITA)	Vini Fantini–Selle Italia	+ 54"
10	Rigoberto Urán (COL)	Team Sky	+ 54"

General classification after stage 15

	Rider	Team	Time
1	Vincenzo Nibali (ITA)	Astana	62h 02' 34"
2	Cadel Evans (AUS)	BMC Racing Team	+ 1' 26"
3	Rigoberto Urán (COL)	Team Sky	+ 2' 46"
4	Mauro Santambrogio (ITA)	Vini Fantini–Selle Italia	+ 2' 47"
5	Michele Scarponi (ITA)	Lampre–Merida	+ 3' 53"
6	Przemysław Niemiec (POL)	Lampre–Merida	+ 4' 35"
7	Carlos Betancur (COL)	Ag2r–La Mondiale	+ 5' 15"
8	Rafał Majka (POL)	Saxo–Tinkoff	+ 5' 20"
9	Domenico Pozzovivo (ITA)	Ag2r–La Mondiale	+ 5' 57"
10	Beñat Intxausti (ESP)	Movistar Team	+ 6' 21"

== Stage 16 ==
21 May 2013 — Valloire (France) to Ivrea, 238 km (147.9 mi)

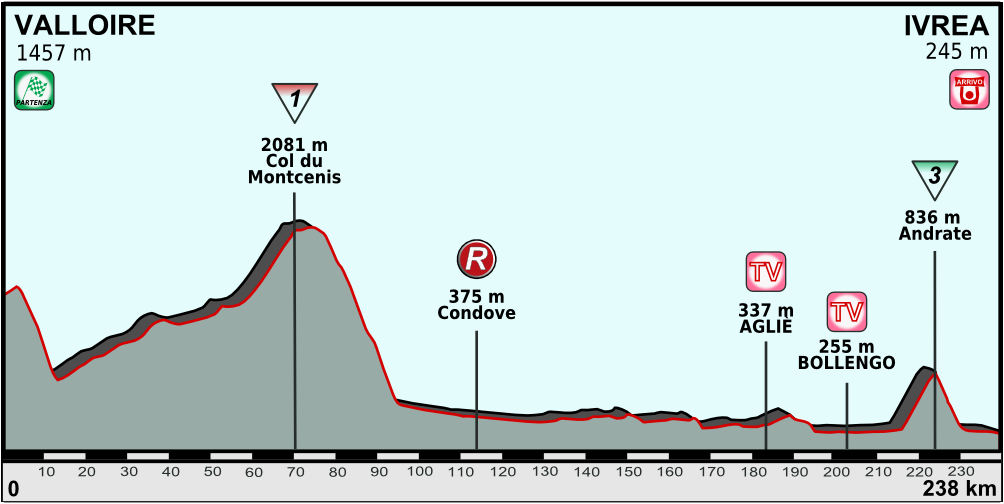

The final week of racing commenced after the race's second rest day the previous day; the sixteenth stage was a transitional stage, returning to Italy following the Col du Galibier finish of the previous stage. Starting in Valloire, the parcours of 238 km (147.9 mi) began with a descent from the Col du Télégraphe, going in the opposite direction from the way that the peloton had climbed previously. Having reached Saint-Michel-de-Maurienne, the parcours sloped up again towards Modane and onwards to the Mont Cenis, this time in reverse, crossing back into Italy. From the foot of the climb, there was around 100 km (62.1 mi) of relatively flat terrain before reaching the finish town of Ivrea for the first time. From there, a 40 km (24.9 mi) loop was tackled, which contained a third-category climb. The climb, the Andrate, averaged around 8% in gradient – reaching 13% in places – and was expected to deny the sprinters of any chance of winning the stage. The day's breakaway was formed prior to the Mont Cenis, when an attack by Blanco Pro Cycling's Wilco Kelderman instigated a move of sixteen riders in total, while six more riders were able to bridge up towards the leaders before they had reached the summit of the climb.

The 22-man lead group held an advantage of around three minutes over the top, with the lead continuing to increase on the descent into Italy. Astana were stationed on the front of the peloton, and were later joined by Team Katusha and RadioShack–Leopard to take up some of the pace-making, when the lead advantage had reached five minutes; this margin was putting the highest-placed riders from those teams – Yuri Trofimov and Robert Kišerlovski – in danger from Cannondale's Damiano Caruso, who was in the breakaway. The lead gap had been more than halved by the time the field reached the first intermediate sprint with around 54 km (33.6 mi) remaining, in the comune of Agliè. Counter-attacks were key on the run-in towards Ivrea for the first time; after several mini-attacks, Androni Giocattoli–Venezuela rider Emanuele Sella was the first to gain a manageable advantage over the rest of the breakaway.

He was later joined by Kelderman and Team Sky's Danny Pate, and they were around twenty seconds clear as they hit Ivrea. A five-rider group made contact on the final climb, among whom was mountains classification leader Stefano Pirazzi (Bardiani Valvole–CSF Inox), who continued to extend his points lead. The remnants of the peloton had also caught up with the leaders, with young rider leader Carlos Betancur of Ag2r–La Mondiale leading Pirazzi over the summit. All the main contenders for the race were up front, with the exception of Vini Fantini–Selle Italia's Mauro Santambrogio, who would ultimately lose over two minutes on the day. A group of three riders managed to get clear in the closing stages, where Beñat Intxausti (Movistar Team) won the sprint ahead of Astana's Tanel Kangert and Przemysław Niemiec of Lampre–Merida. Intxausti saluted his former team-mate Xavier Tondo while coming across the line; crossing his fingers to form an X, in honour of Tondo, who was killed prior to a training ride with Intxausti in May 2011.

Stage 16 result

	Rider	Team	Time
1	Beñat Intxausti (ESP)	Movistar Team	5h 52' 48"
2	Tanel Kangert (EST)	Astana	s.t.
3	Przemysław Niemiec (POL)	Lampre–Merida	s.t.
4	Ramūnas Navardauskas (LTU)	Garmin–Sharp	+ 14"
5	Cadel Evans (AUS)	BMC Racing Team	+ 14"
6	Franco Pellizotti (ITA)	Androni Giocattoli–Venezuela	+ 14"
7	Michele Scarponi (ITA)	Lampre–Merida	+ 14"
8	Rafał Majka (POL)	Saxo–Tinkoff	+ 14"
9	José Herrada (ESP)	Movistar Team	+ 14"
10	Carlos Betancur (COL)	Ag2r–La Mondiale	+ 14"

General classification after stage 16

	Rider	Team	Time
1	Vincenzo Nibali (ITA)	Astana	67h 55' 36"
2	Cadel Evans (AUS)	BMC Racing Team	+ 1' 26"
3	Rigoberto Urán (COL)	Team Sky	+ 2' 46"
4	Michele Scarponi (ITA)	Lampre–Merida	+ 3' 53"
5	Przemysław Niemiec (POL)	Lampre–Merida	+ 4' 13"
6	Mauro Santambrogio (ITA)	Vini Fantini–Selle Italia	+ 4' 57"
7	Carlos Betancur (COL)	Ag2r–La Mondiale	+ 5' 15"
8	Rafał Majka (POL)	Saxo–Tinkoff	+ 5' 20"
9	Beñat Intxausti (ESP)	Movistar Team	+ 5' 47"
10	Robert Gesink (NED)	Blanco Pro Cycling	+ 7' 24"

== Stage 17 ==
22 May 2013 — Caravaggio to Vicenza, 214 km (133.0 mi)

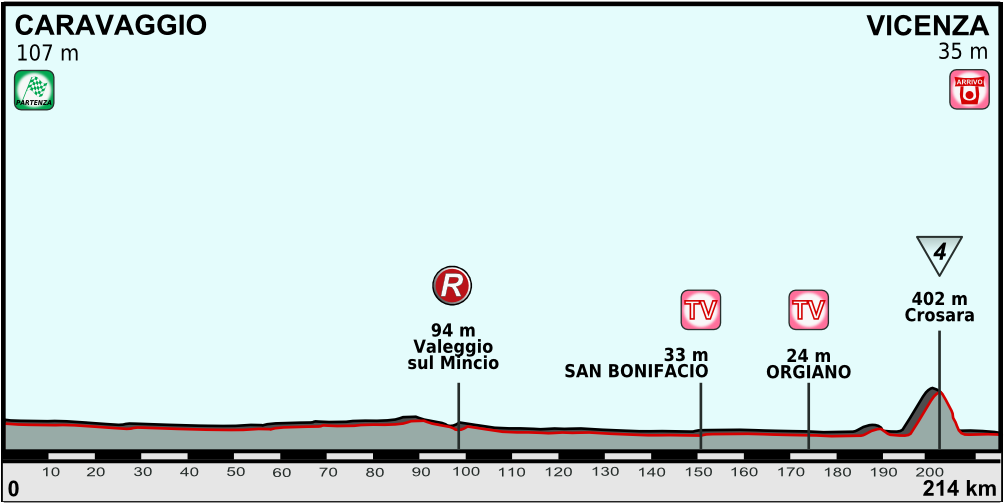

With the exception of the final stage of the race heading into Brescia, the seventeenth stage marked one of the last opportunities for a sprinter to prevail in the 2013 Giro d'Italia. Starting in the Lombardy comune of Caravaggio, the parcours of 214 km (133.0 mi) in length, was predominantly a flat, transitional stage, except for a fourth-category climb towards the end of the stage. Following the two intermediate sprint points in San Bonifacio and Orgiano, the climb of the Crosara was narrow and technical; averaging 6.8% over the course of 5.3 km (3.3 mi) – with portions of the climb reaching 12% in gradient – meaning that teams would have to take extra care in consideration of the climb, hoping to keep their sprinters in check prior to the descent and finish into Vicenza.

In the early kilometres, the day's breakaway was formed as Luke Durbridge (Orica–GreenEDGE), Maxim Belkov of Team Katusha, Lotto–Belisol rider Gert Dockx and Androni Giocattoli–Venezuela's Miguel Ángel Rubiano went clear. The quartet's lead reached a maximum of around five minutes at the midpoint of the stage, but was gradually reduced from then on. Omega Pharma–Quick-Step took station on the front of the peloton, in the hope of keeping points classification leader Mark Cavendish in contention for the stage victory; other sprinters' teams also helped to bring the time gap down. Belkov was first to be dropped, after falling into difficulty with around 30 km (18.6 mi) remaining. The other three riders from the lead group held an advantage of around one minute as they hit the foot of the Crosara. Cavendish ran into trouble on the climb, but remained as leader of the points classification overnight.

Rubiano lifted the pace, which saw Dockx being dislodged from the front, while a second burst of acceleration saw his only other lead companion, Durbridge, being dropped as well. Vini Fantini–Selle Italia launched a two-pronged attack through Alessandro Proni and Danilo Di Luca, with Di Luca forcing himself clear in chase of Rubiano; he caught him with just under 20 km (12.4 mi) remaining, when Giovanni Visconti (Movistar Team) attacked from the peloton, joining quickly after bridging the 30-second gap. Visconti attacked over the top of the climb solo, gaining a maximum advantage of 35 seconds, but did enough to hold on, despite nearly crashing, for his second stage win in four days – his team's third in succession, after Beñat Intxausti's win on stage 16 – by 19 seconds. Garmin–Sharp's Ramūnas Navardauskas led the main group across the line in second, mistakenly believing he had won the stage, while the main contenders were also positioned within the group, leaving the general classification unchanged.

Stage 17 result

	Rider	Team	Time
1	Giovanni Visconti (ITA)	Movistar Team	5h 15' 34"
2	Ramūnas Navardauskas (LTU)	Garmin–Sharp	+ 19"
3	Luka Mezgec (SLO)	Argos–Shimano	+ 19"
4	Filippo Pozzato (ITA)	Lampre–Merida	+ 19"
5	Danilo Hondo (GER)	RadioShack–Leopard	+ 19"
6	Salvatore Puccio (ITA)	Team Sky	+ 19"
7	Sacha Modolo (ITA)	Bardiani Valvole–CSF Inox	+ 19"
8	Fabio Felline (ITA)	Androni Giocattoli–Venezuela	+ 19"
9	Francisco Ventoso (ESP)	Movistar Team	+ 19"
10	Cadel Evans (AUS)	BMC Racing Team	+ 19"

General classification after stage 17

	Rider	Team	Time
1	Vincenzo Nibali (ITA)	Astana	73h 11' 29"
2	Cadel Evans (AUS)	BMC Racing Team	+ 1' 26"
3	Rigoberto Urán (COL)	Team Sky	+ 2' 46"
4	Michele Scarponi (ITA)	Lampre–Merida	+ 3' 53"
5	Przemysław Niemiec (POL)	Lampre–Merida	+ 4' 13"
6	Mauro Santambrogio (ITA)	Vini Fantini–Selle Italia	+ 4' 57"
7	Carlos Betancur (COL)	Ag2r–La Mondiale	+ 5' 15"
8	Rafał Majka (POL)	Saxo–Tinkoff	+ 5' 20"
9	Beñat Intxausti (ESP)	Movistar Team	+ 5' 47"
10	Robert Gesink (NED)	Blanco Pro Cycling	+ 7' 24"

== Stage 18 ==
23 May 2013 — Mori to Polsa, 20.6 km (12.8 mi), individual time trial (ITT)

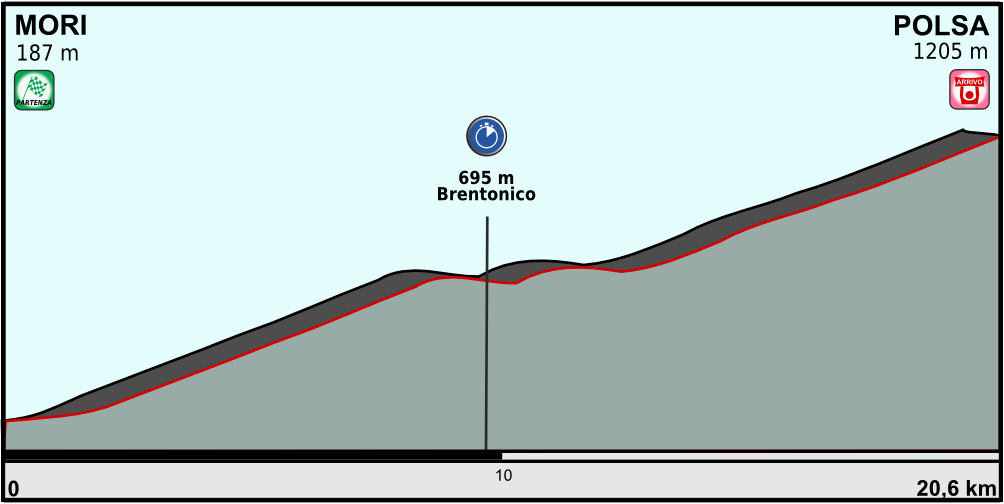

The second of two individual time trials to be held in the 2013 Giro d'Italia, the eighteenth stage was deemed as a mountainous time trial – the form of the discipline returning to the race after a one-year hiatus – in the Trentino-Alto Adige/Südtirol region, in northern Italy. The parcours of 20.6 km (12.8 mi) was split into several distinct sections; starting at the velodrome in Mori, the opening kilometre of the stage was on a false flat, before an 8 km (5.0 mi), 6.6% climb towards the intermediate time-check at Brentonico. An undulating false flat section in the middle portion was then covered, before a steeper climb to the finish in Polsa; the slopes hit 10% at one point during the climb, but again averaged 6.6% over around 6.5 km (4.0 mi). As was customary of time trial stages, the riders set off in reverse order from where they were ranked in the general classification at the end of the previous stage.

Thus, Rafael Andriato of Vini Fantini–Selle Italia, who, in 172nd place, trailed overall leader Vincenzo Nibali (Astana) by three hours, fifty-six minutes and fifty seconds, was the first rider to set off on the stage. Andriato was not the first rider to reach the line, as Euskaltel–Euskadi rider Miguel Mínguez – who started directly behind him on the road, at a one-minute interval – passed him and went on to record a time of 48' 55" for the course. Mínguez's time held for around quarter of an hour until Steve Cummings took the lead for the BMC Racing Team, when he recorded a time for the course of 47' 08". Eros Capecchi was first to break 47 minutes for the Movistar Team, before Team Sky's Dario Cataldo – the Italian national time trial champion – assumed the top position with a time of 46' 10". Blanco Pro Cycling rider Stef Clement was the next rider to record the quickest time, achieving a time five seconds clear of Cataldo, setting a time of 46' 05".

Damiano Caruso (Cannondale) broke into the 45-minute region with the next quickest time for the course, with the weather conditions changing around the time that he was reaching the finish in Polsa. From the sun that had greeted the earlier runners on the course, the weather worsened and soon heavy rain was falling. Caruso's time was ultimately good enough for third on the stage; the first rider to beat the time was Euskaltel–Euskadi's Samuel Sánchez, who recorded a time of 45' 27", a time which enabled him to move into the top ten in the general classification. However, the best performance was left to the overall leader, Nibali. Setting the best time at the intermediate time-check, Nibali completed the course in 44' 29", to take his third Giro stage victory. He also managed to get within 24 seconds of catching his main rival for the general classification, BMC Racing Team's Cadel Evans, who had started three minutes before him. As a result, Nibali's overall lead grew to 4' 02" over Evans, with Team Sky rider Rigoberto Urán ten seconds further back in third.

Stage 18 result

	Rider	Team	Time
1	Vincenzo Nibali (ITA)	Astana	44' 29"
2	Samuel Sánchez (ESP)	Euskaltel–Euskadi	+ 58"
3	Damiano Caruso (ITA)	Cannondale	+ 1' 20"
4	Michele Scarponi (ITA)	Lampre–Merida	+ 1' 21"
5	Rafał Majka (POL)	Saxo–Tinkoff	+ 1' 25"
6	Rigoberto Urán (COL)	Team Sky	+ 1' 26"
7	Carlos Betancur (COL)	Ag2r–La Mondiale	+ 1' 32"
8	Stef Clement (NED)	Blanco Pro Cycling	+ 1' 36"
9	Dario Cataldo (ITA)	Team Sky	+ 1' 41"
10	Danilo Di Luca (ITA)	Vini Fantini–Selle Italia	+ 1' 52"

General classification after stage 18

	Rider	Team	Time
1	Vincenzo Nibali (ITA)	Astana	73h 55' 58"
2	Cadel Evans (AUS)	BMC Racing Team	+ 4' 02"
3	Rigoberto Urán (COL)	Team Sky	+ 4' 12"
4	Michele Scarponi (ITA)	Lampre–Merida	+ 5' 14"
5	Przemysław Niemiec (POL)	Lampre–Merida	+ 6' 09"
6	Rafał Majka (POL)	Saxo–Tinkoff	+ 6' 45"
7	Carlos Betancur (COL)	Ag2r–La Mondiale	+ 6' 47"
8	Mauro Santambrogio (ITA)	Vini Fantini–Selle Italia	+ 7' 30"
9	Beñat Intxausti (ESP)	Movistar Team	+ 8' 36"
10	Samuel Sánchez (ESP)	Euskaltel–Euskadi	+ 9' 34"

== Stage 19 ==
24 May 2013 — Ponte di Legno to Val Martello–Martelltal, 160 km (99.4 mi)

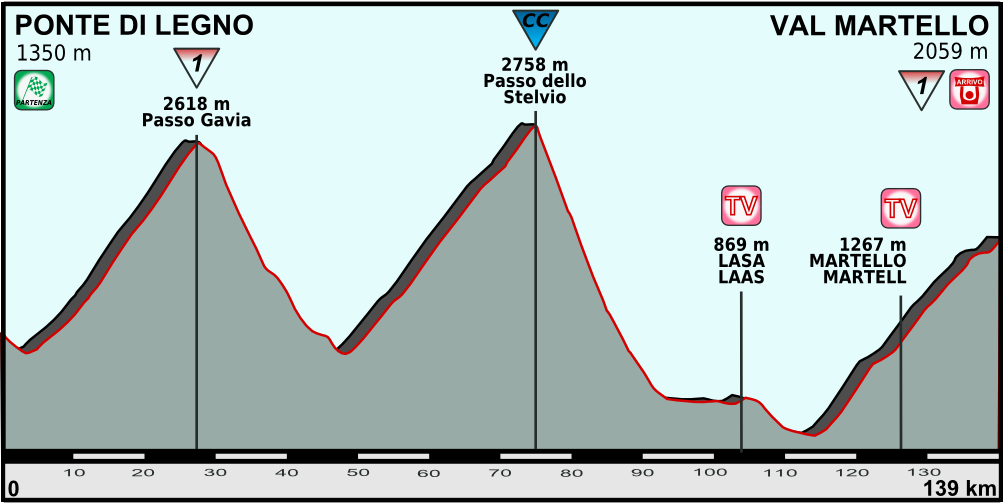

The nineteenth stage was scheduled to be the queen stage of the 2013 Giro d'Italia, covering a distance of 139 km (86.4 mi) between Ponte di Legno and Val Martello. However, much like the previous weekend's stages to Bardonecchia and the Col du Galibier, the scheduled route was affected by poor weather conditions; race organisers had been expecting snow to fall on the potentially key mountain stages. This materialised, and as such, the two main climbs for the day – the 16.5 km (10.3 mi)-long Passo di Gavia and the 21.7 km (13.5 mi) Passo di Stelvio (the scheduled Cima Coppi for the Giro), the highest two climbs of the race – were removed from the route. A revised route was released the night before the scheduled start of the stage.

Along with the extension of the stage by 21 km (13.0 mi), two new climbs were added to the route. The second-category Passo del Tonale was set to test the riders – the 7.5% average climb of 8.3 km (5.2 mi), coming inside the opening 20 km (12.4 mi) of the stage – while the first-category Hofmahdjoch, 9.5% over 8.4 km (5.2 mi), was due to be ascented halfway through the stage. Further adverse conditions overnight dropped even more snow on the scheduled itinerary, and ultimately, race organisers cancelled the stage on safety grounds; the first weather-related cancellation of a stage in the Giro since 1989 – when the sixteenth stage was cancelled – and the first cancellation of any form since 2001, when the peloton refused to race in the eighteenth stage, after drug raids. Competing riders and teams supported the decision that the race organisers made in relation to the stage.

Later in the day, it was announced that Vini Fantini–Selle Italia rider Danilo Di Luca had tested positive for the banned glycoprotein hormone erythropoietin (EPO) – which controls red blood cell production – during an out-of-competition drugs test held a week in advance of the race. After receiving notification of his rider's positive test, team manager Angelo Citracca stated that Di Luca had been sacked – after less than a month with the squad – and that they were launching legal proceedings against Di Luca. Di Luca – who had previously served a fifteen-month suspension after testing positive for continuous erythropoietin receptor activator (CERA) at the 2009 Giro d'Italia – himself expressed his "surprise" at the positive test, while race director Michele Acquarone angrily chastised Di Luca at a press conference, describing him as "stupid".

General classification after cancellation of stage 19

	Rider	Team	Time
1	Vincenzo Nibali (ITA)	Astana	73h 55' 58"
2	Cadel Evans (AUS)	BMC Racing Team	+ 4' 02"
3	Rigoberto Urán (COL)	Team Sky	+ 4' 12"
4	Michele Scarponi (ITA)	Lampre–Merida	+ 5' 14"
5	Przemysław Niemiec (POL)	Lampre–Merida	+ 6' 09"
6	Rafał Majka (POL)	Saxo–Tinkoff	+ 6' 45"
7	Carlos Betancur (COL)	Ag2r–La Mondiale	+ 6' 47"
8	Mauro Santambrogio (ITA)	Vini Fantini–Selle Italia	+ 7' 30"
9	Beñat Intxausti (ESP)	Movistar Team	+ 8' 36"
10	Samuel Sánchez (ESP)	Euskaltel–Euskadi	+ 9' 34"

== Stage 20 ==
25 May 2013 — Silandro–Schlanders to Tre Cime di Lavaredo, 210 km (130.5 mi)

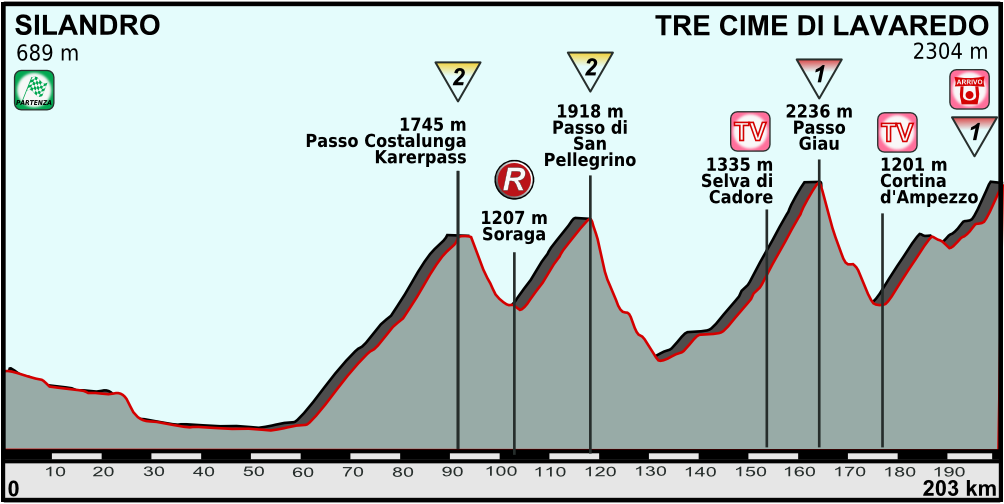

Like several other stages to be held during the second half of the 2013 Giro d'Italia, the penultimate stage of the race had to be re-routed due to unfavourable weather conditions which resulted in potentially dangerous riding conditions. The original parcours of 203 km (126.1 mi) was slightly lengthened to 210 km (130.5 mi), but it also meant that three of the five originally-scheduled climbs of the route being removed; the first-category Passo Giau was bypassed, along with the second-category ascents of the Karerpass and the Passo di San Pellegrino. With the previous day's cancellation of the Passo di Stelvio, the climb to Tre Cime di Lavaredo became the Cima Coppi. The Passo Tre Croci was the first part of the climb, averaging 7.2% over 8 km (5.0 mi), before a false flat to the short, steep Col Sant'Angelo. The final climb averaged over 11% for the final 4 km (2.5 mi), but reached 18% in places.

The day's breakaway was formed after around 25 km (15.5 mi) of racing, with a four-rider group consisting of earlier stage winner Adam Hansen (Lotto–Belisol), Pavel Brutt of Team Katusha, RadioShack–Leopard rider Yaroslav Popovych and Androni Giocattoli–Venezuela's Giairo Ermeti. The quartet built up a lead of more than eight minutes at one point during the stage, before the peloton – being led by Euskaltel–Euskadi, Colombia and Cannondale – set about reducing that advantage. As the leaders reached Cortina d'Ampezzo, their advantage was around three minutes; upon leaving the comune, Popovych attacked his companions. Brutt and Hansen were able to bridge back up, before Brutt attacked of his own accord. He quickly gained an advantage of around a minute over the others, when Orica–GreenEDGE rider Pieter Weening attacked from the peloton, closely followed by mountains classification leader Stefano Pirazzi (Bardiani Valvole–CSF Inox) and Darwin Atapuma of Colombia. Weening caught up with Hansen, and the duo set off in chase of Brutt, with the peloton around one minute behind the leader, and closing on the climb.

By the top of the Passo Tre Croci, Brutt was around 30 seconds clear of Weening – who had dropped Hansen – with the leaders group a further 20 seconds behind. In the driving snow, Brutt was caught with around 9 km (5.6 mi) remaining by Weening, Pirazzi, Omega Pharma–Quick-Step's Gianluca Brambilla and the Movistar Team's Eros Capecchi. Capecchi launched a move at the bottom of the final climb, gaining ground from the others, but behind, Vincenzo Nibali, in the maglia rosa for Astana, was pulled clear from the peloton by team-mate Tanel Kangert. Nibali was joined by Colombian duo Rigoberto Urán (Team Sky) and Carlos Betancur (Ag2r–La Mondiale) for a period, and after catching Capecchi, Nibali launched another attack, soloing away to his second consecutive stage victory, and all but securing the race overall. Colombia's Fabio Duarte bridged up to his compatriots, and ultimately won the sprint for second place, seventeen seconds behind, ahead of Urán and Betancur. In the general classification, Nibali extended his overall lead to 4' 43" over Urán, who had moved ahead of BMC Racing Team's Cadel Evans – who cracked on the climb – for second place overall. Betancur was another mover; he moved from seventh to fifth overall, and reclaimed the lead of the young rider classification from Saxo–Tinkoff rider Rafał Majka.

Stage 20 result

	Rider	Team	Time
1	Vincenzo Nibali (ITA)	Astana	5h 27' 41"
2	Fabio Duarte (COL)	Colombia	+ 17"
3	Rigoberto Urán (COL)	Team Sky	+ 19"
4	Carlos Betancur (COL)	Ag2r–La Mondiale	+ 21"
5	Fabio Aru (ITA)	Astana	+ 44"
6	Franco Pellizotti (ITA)	Androni Giocattoli–Venezuela	+ 48"
7	Domenico Pozzovivo (ITA)	Ag2r–La Mondiale	+ 54"
8	Damiano Caruso (ITA)	Cannondale	+ 58"
9	Darwin Atapuma (COL)	Colombia	+ 1' 00"
10	Rafał Majka (POL)	Saxo–Tinkoff	+ 1' 04"

General classification after stage 20

	Rider	Team	Time
1	Vincenzo Nibali (ITA)	Astana	79h 23' 19"
2	Rigoberto Urán (COL)	Team Sky	+ 4' 43"
3	Cadel Evans (AUS)	BMC Racing Team	+ 5' 52"
4	Michele Scarponi (ITA)	Lampre–Merida	+ 6' 48"
5	Carlos Betancur (COL)	Ag2r–La Mondiale	+ 7' 28"
6	Przemysław Niemiec (POL)	Lampre–Merida	+ 7' 43"
7	Rafał Majka (POL)	Saxo–Tinkoff	+ 8' 09"
8	Beñat Intxausti (ESP)	Movistar Team	+ 10' 26"
9	Mauro Santambrogio (ITA)	Vini Fantini–Selle Italia	+ 10' 32"
10	Domenico Pozzovivo (ITA)	Ag2r–La Mondiale	+ 10' 59"

== Stage 21 ==
26 May 2013 — Riese Pio X to Brescia, 197 km (122.4 mi)

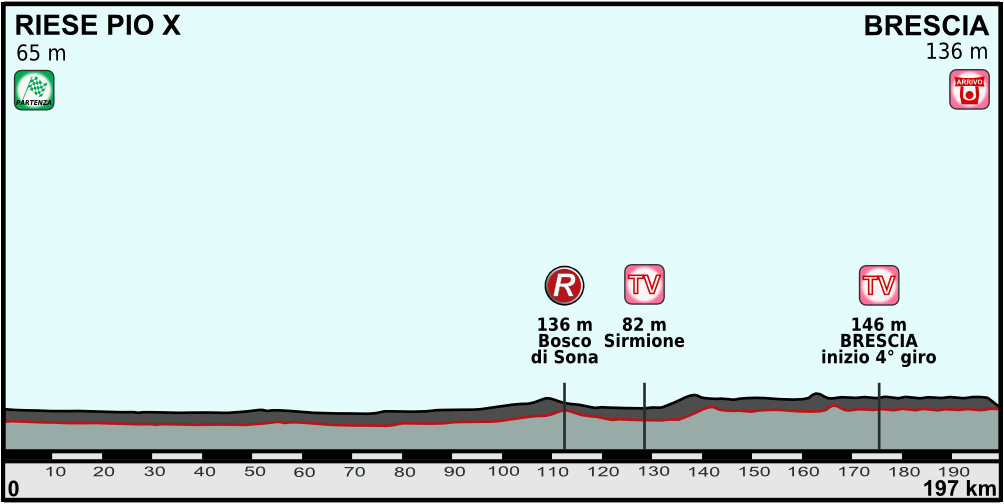

After the previous five editions of the Giro d'Italia had finished with individual time trial stages, the 2013 edition ended with a mass-start road stage. With no categorised climbs on the route, and very little in the way of undulation during the 197 km (122.4 mi) parcours, it was widely expected to finish in a mass sprint finish in Brescia. Once the riders had reached Brescia, the peloton had to complete eight laps of a 4.15 km (2.6 mi)-long city centre circuit, with the race's final intermediate sprint coming on the third passage through the finish line. Going into the stage, the points classification was also set to be settled, as overall leader Vincenzo Nibali (Astana) held an eleven-point advantage over Omega Pharma–Quick-Step's Mark Cavendish, with 41 points on offer during the stage. With little competition in the stage, the field remained together all the way to Brescia.

Cavendish had reduced the gap in the classification to three points, after taking the honours in the opening intermediate sprint at Sirmione. Vini Fantini–Selle Italia's Stefano Garzelli was allowed to head into Brescia on his own, in his final Giro d'Italia, before Astana took up the head of the pace again. Giairo Ermeti (Androni Giocattoli–Venezuela) attacked for the second day running, and once Cavendish had chased him down and taken the second batch of eight points at the other intermediate sprint, the group came back together for the eventual final sprint. Omega Pharma–Quick-Step led into the final kilometre for Cavendish, with Cannondale in tow for Elia Viviani; after Matteo Trentin pulled off, Cavendish launched his sprint and despite competition from Bardiani Valvole–CSF Inox's Sacha Modolo, achieved his fifth stage win of the race, to become the fifth rider to win the points classification at all three Grand Tours. Nibali finished within the peloton to take the general classification, and his second Grand Tour overall win, after the 2010 Vuelta a España. Ag2r–La Mondiale's Carlos Betancur and Stefano Pirazzi (Bardiani Valvole–CSF Inox) also confirmed their respective wins in the young rider classification and the mountains classification.

Stage 21 result

	Rider	Team	Time
1	Mark Cavendish (GBR)	Omega Pharma–Quick-Step	5h 30' 09"
2	Sacha Modolo (ITA)	Bardiani Valvole–CSF Inox	s.t.
3	Elia Viviani (ITA)	Cannondale	s.t.
4	Giacomo Nizzolo (ITA)	RadioShack–Leopard	s.t.
5	Luka Mezgec (SLO)	Argos–Shimano	s.t.
6	Roberto Ferrari (ITA)	Lampre–Merida	s.t.
7	Kenny Dehaes (BEL)	Lotto–Belisol	s.t.
8	Manuel Belletti (ITA)	Ag2r–La Mondiale	s.t.
9	Giovanni Visconti (ITA)	Movistar Team	s.t.
10	Luca Paolini (ITA)	Team Katusha	s.t.

Final General Classification

	Rider	Team	Time
1	Vincenzo Nibali (ITA)	Astana	84h 53' 28"
2	Rigoberto Urán (COL)	Team Sky	+ 4' 43"
3	Cadel Evans (AUS)	BMC Racing Team	+ 5' 52"
4	Michele Scarponi (ITA)	Lampre–Merida	+ 6' 48"
5	Carlos Betancur (COL)	Ag2r–La Mondiale	+ 7' 28"
6	Przemysław Niemiec (POL)	Lampre–Merida	+ 7' 43"
7	Rafał Majka (POL)	Saxo–Tinkoff	+ 8' 09"
8	Beñat Intxausti (ESP)	Movistar Team	+ 10' 26"
9	Mauro Santambrogio (ITA)	Vini Fantini–Selle Italia	+ 10' 32"
10	Domenico Pozzovivo (ITA)	Ag2r–La Mondiale	+ 10' 59"
