= 2013 Giro d'Italia =

2013 UCI World Tour, race 15 of 28
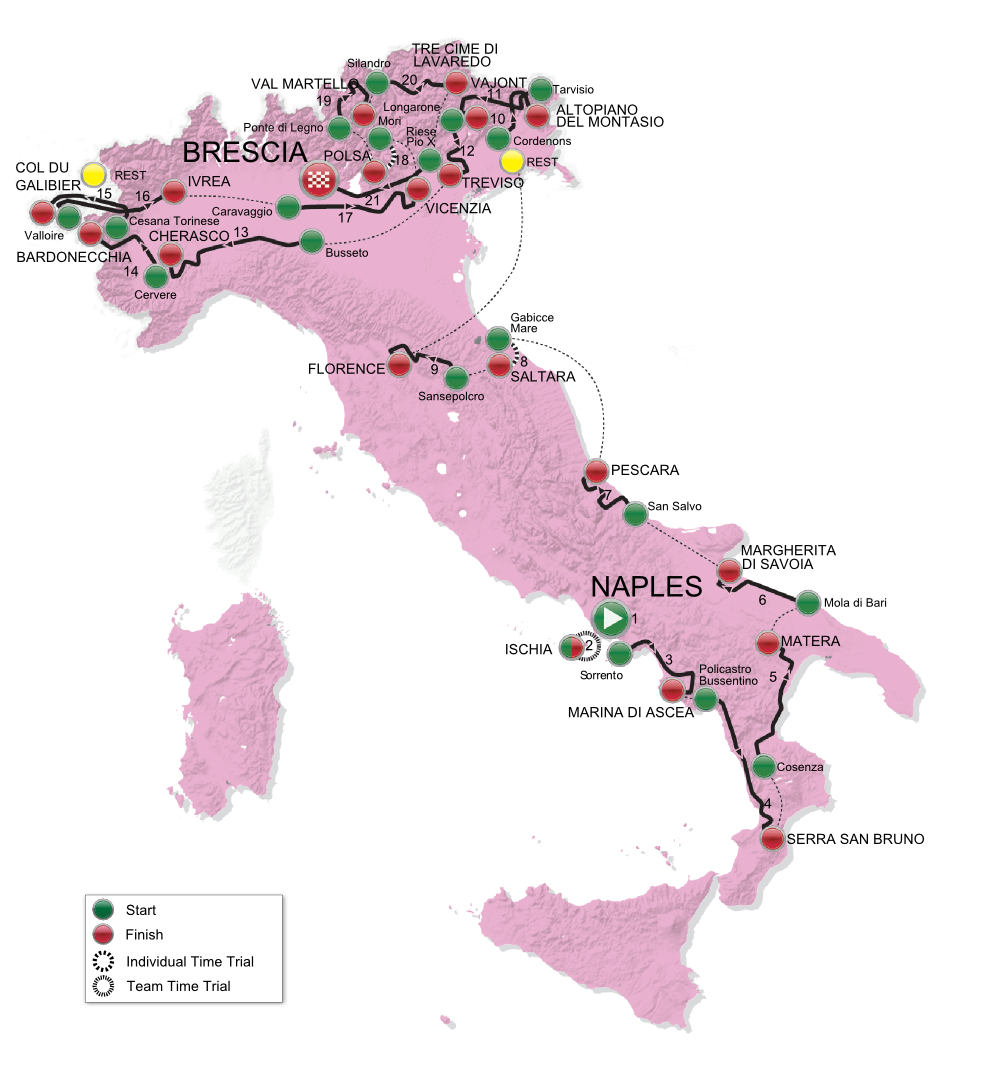

Race details
- Dates: 4–26 May 2013
- Stages: 21
- Distance: 3,405 km (2,116 mi)

Results
Jersey awarded to the overall winner	Winner	Vincenzo Nibali (ITA)	(Astana)
	Second	Rigoberto Urán (COL)	(Team Sky)
	Third	Cadel Evans (AUS)	(BMC Racing Team)
Jersey awarded to the points classification winner	Points	Mark Cavendish (GBR)	(Omega Pharma–Quick-Step)
Jersey awarded to the mountains classification winner	Mountains	Stefano Pirazzi (ITA)	(Bardiani Valvole–CSF Inox)
Jersey awarded to the young rider classification winner	Young rider	Carlos Betancur (COL)	(Ag2r–La Mondiale)
	Sprints	Rafael Andriato (BRA)	(Vini Fantini–Selle Italia)
Jersey awarded to the combativity classification winner	Combativity	Mark Cavendish (GBR)	(Omega Pharma–Quick-Step)
	Team	Team Sky	
	Team points	Movistar Team	

The 2013 Giro d'Italia was the 96th edition of the Giro d'Italia, one of cycling's Grand Tours. It started in Naples and finished in Brescia. Vincenzo Nibali of team Astana won the general classification.

== Teams ==
As a UCI World Tour race, the Giro was obliged to invite all teams in the UCI's top division—the ProTour teams—and these teams were obliged to take part. At the beginning of the season, there were, as in recent years, 18 ProTour teams, and the race organisers issued four wildcard invitations to fill the usual quota of 22 teams for the event. However, Team Katusha successfully appealed against its loss of ProTour status to the Court of Arbitration for Sport and the UCI decided against demoting any of the other teams; meaning that 23 teams took part in the Giro, as happened under a special dispensation in 2011. The participating teams were:

- Ag2r–La Mondiale
- Androni Giocattoli–Venezuela*
- Argos–Shimano
- Astana
- Bardiani Valvole–CSF Inox*
- Blanco Pro Cycling
- BMC Racing Team
- Cannondale
- Colombia*
- Euskaltel–Euskadi
- FDJ
- Garmin–Sharp
- Lampre–Merida
- Lotto–Belisol
- Movistar Team
- Omega Pharma–Quick-Step
- Orica–GreenEDGE
- RadioShack–Leopard
- Team Katusha
- Saxo–Tinkoff
- Team Sky
- Vacansoleil–DCM
- Vini Fantini–Selle Italia*

*: Pro Continental teams given wild card entry to this event.

== Pre-race favourites ==
2012 Giro winner Ryder Hesjedal, Bradley Wiggins, winner of the 2012 Tour de France, and Vincenzo Nibali were among the favourites for overall victory. Other possible contenders included Michele Scarponi, Cadel Evans, Robert Gesink and Samuel Sánchez.

== Route and stages ==
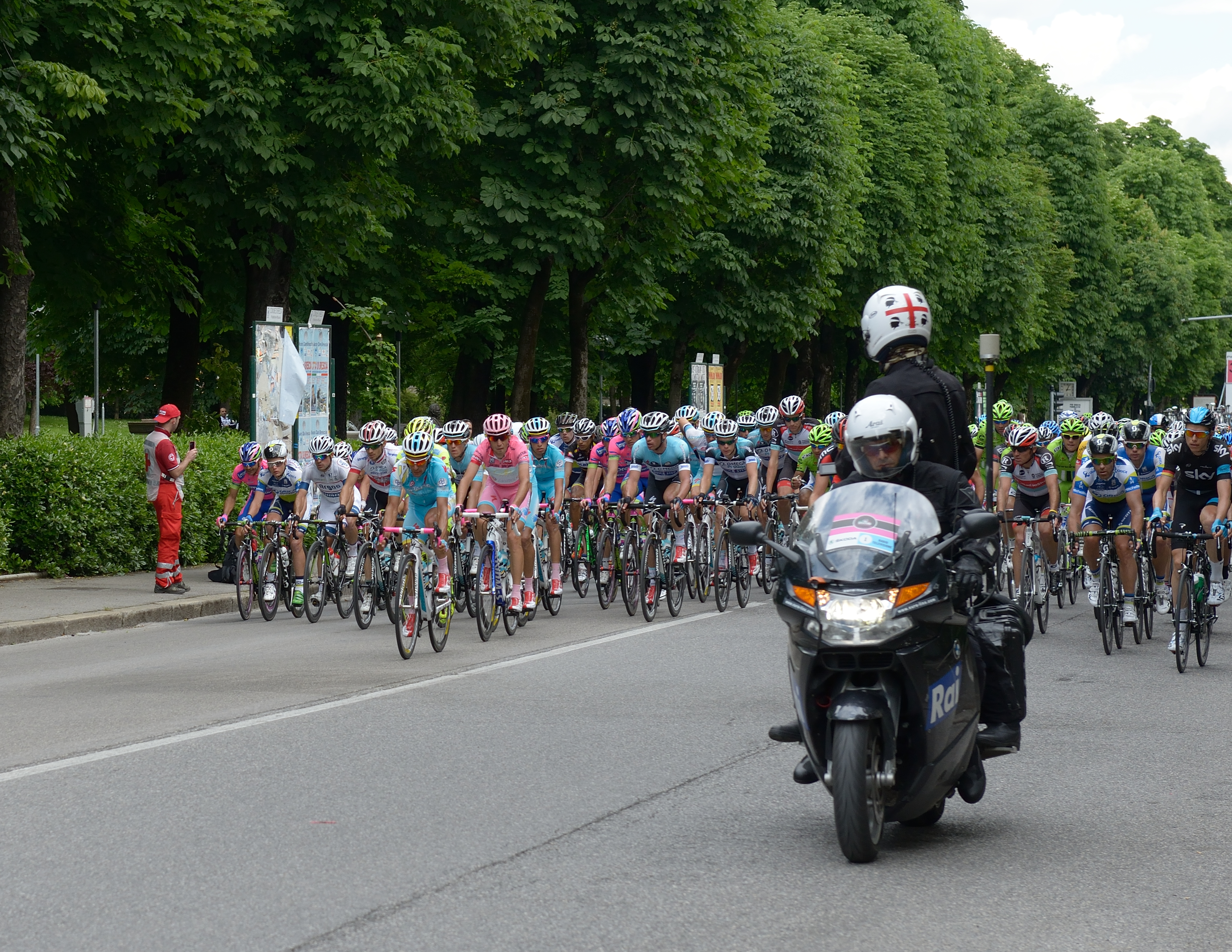
The Giro arrives at the final destination Brescia

On 30 September 2012 the complete route was announced in Milan. For the first time since 2008, the first stages of the race (eight in total) took place in the south of Italy. The island of Ischia also hosted a stage for the first time in 54 years.

In 2013, the race paid tribute to the victims of the Vajont Dam disaster of 1963, but also to composer Giuseppe Verdi in stage 13 and to famous cyclist and triple Giro winner Gino Bartali in stage 9. There was speculation before the race that some sections of the route may also be relevant for contenders of the world championships in Florence.

In a revocation of a rule change in the 2012 race, all mass-start stages again awarded time bonuses to the first three riders, 20, 12, and 8 seconds respectively. In 2012, stages classified high-mountain did not award time bonuses. This Giro was also the first to feature two intermediate sprints per road stage, rather than only one. These sprints awarded points to the points classification and bonus seconds in the general classification.

List of stages
Stage	Date	Course	Distance	Type	Winner
1	4 May	Naples	130 km (81 mi)	Flat stage	Mark Cavendish (GBR)
2	5 May	Ischia to Forio	17.4 km (11 mi)	Team time trial	Team Sky
3	6 May	Sorrento to Marina di Ascea	222 km (138 mi)	Medium-mountain stage	Luca Paolini (ITA)
4	7 May	Policastro Bussentino to Serra San Bruno	246 km (153 mi)	Medium-mountain stage	Enrico Battaglin (ITA)
5	8 May	Cosenza to Matera	203 km (126 mi)	Flat stage	John Degenkolb (GER)
6	9 May	Mola di Bari to Margherita di Savoia	169 km (105 mi)	Flat stage	Mark Cavendish (GBR)
7	10 May	San Salvo to Pescara	177 km (110 mi)	Medium-mountain stage	Adam Hansen (AUS)
8	11 May	Gabicce Mare to Saltara	54.8 km (34 mi)	Individual time trial	Alex Dowsett (GBR)
9	12 May	Sansepolcro to Florence	170 km (106 mi)	Medium-mountain stage	Maxim Belkov (RUS)
	13 May	Rest day			
10	14 May	Cordenons to Altopiano del Montasio	167 km (104 mi)	Mountain stage	Rigoberto Urán (COL)
11	15 May	Cave del Predil to Erto e Casso	182 km (113 mi)	Medium-mountain stage	Ramūnas Navardauskas (LTU)
12	16 May	Longarone to Treviso	134 km (83 mi)	Flat stage	Mark Cavendish (GBR)
13	17 May	Busseto to Cherasco	254 km (158 mi)	Flat stage	Mark Cavendish (GBR)
14	18 May	Cervere to Bardonecchia	180 km (112 mi)	Mountain stage	~~Mauro Santambrogio (ITA)~~; Vincenzo Nibali (ITA)
15	19 May	Cesana Torinese to Col du Galibier Valloire	149 km (93 mi)	Mountain stage	Giovanni Visconti (ITA)
	20 May	Rest day			
16	21 May	Valloire to Ivrea	238 km (148 mi)	Medium-mountain stage	Beñat Intxausti (ESP)
17	22 May	Caravaggio to Vicenza	214 km (133 mi)	Flat stage	Giovanni Visconti (ITA)
18	23 May	Mori to Pölsa	20.6 km (13 mi)	Individual time trial	Vincenzo Nibali (ITA)
19	24 May	Ponte di Legno to Martell	~~139 km (86 mi)~~	Mountain stage	Stage cancelled
20	25 May	Schlanders to Tre Cime di Lavaredo	203 km (126 mi)	Mountain stage	Vincenzo Nibali (ITA)
21	26 May	Riese Pio X to Brescia	197 km (122 mi)	Flat stage	Mark Cavendish (GBR)

== Race overview ==
The 2013 Giro d'Italia featured cold and wet weather, leading Bicycling magazine to call it "one of the more grueling Grand Tours in recent memory." During the first week of the race it looked like it may be a close contest that came down to the final stages. On the eighth stage, a time trial, Vincenzo Nibali took over the pink jersey (given to the overall leader). Early departures by contenders Ryder Hesjedal and Bradley Wiggins took much of the drama out of the race. By the final stages, all Nibali had to do was remain upright to claim victory. ESPN's Andrew Hood described his performance as "three nearly perfect weeks of racing." "Nibali revealed he is a complete rider, handling the stresses and demands of racing both on and off the bike," wrote Hood. Nibali called winning the Giro "a dream" and said it was unlikely he would compete in the Tour de France. It was the first time an Italian won the race outright since 2010.

Others with strong performance in the Giro d'Italia included Carlos Betancur, Mark Cavendish, Cadel Evans, and Rigoberto Urán. Riding in his first grand-tour event, 23-year-old Betancur finished fifth overall and won the best young rider's jersey. He had two second places on stages during the race. "I won my Giro", he said. Cavendish won five stages – all bunch sprints – and the points jersey. He became the fifth rider to win the points jersey at all three grand-tour races. Evans was written off by many commentators following a poor 2012 season, but bounced back with a third-place finish at the Giro. In so doing, he became the oldest rider to reach the podium since 1928. "I wasn't even planning on racing this Giro until a few weeks before it started, so to be [third] isn't so bad," he said. Urán won the tenth stage, and took second overall. His second-place finish came despite his loss of 1:30 on stage seven when he waited for teammate Bradley Wiggins to catch up to him. It was the best finish by Colombian rider since 1995.

== Classification leadership ==
In the 2013 Giro d'Italia, four different jerseys were awarded. For the general classification, calculated by adding each cyclist's finishing times on each stage, and allowing time bonuses for the first three finishers on mass-start stages, the leader received a pink jersey. This classification is considered the most important of the Giro d'Italia, and the winner is considered the winner of the Giro.

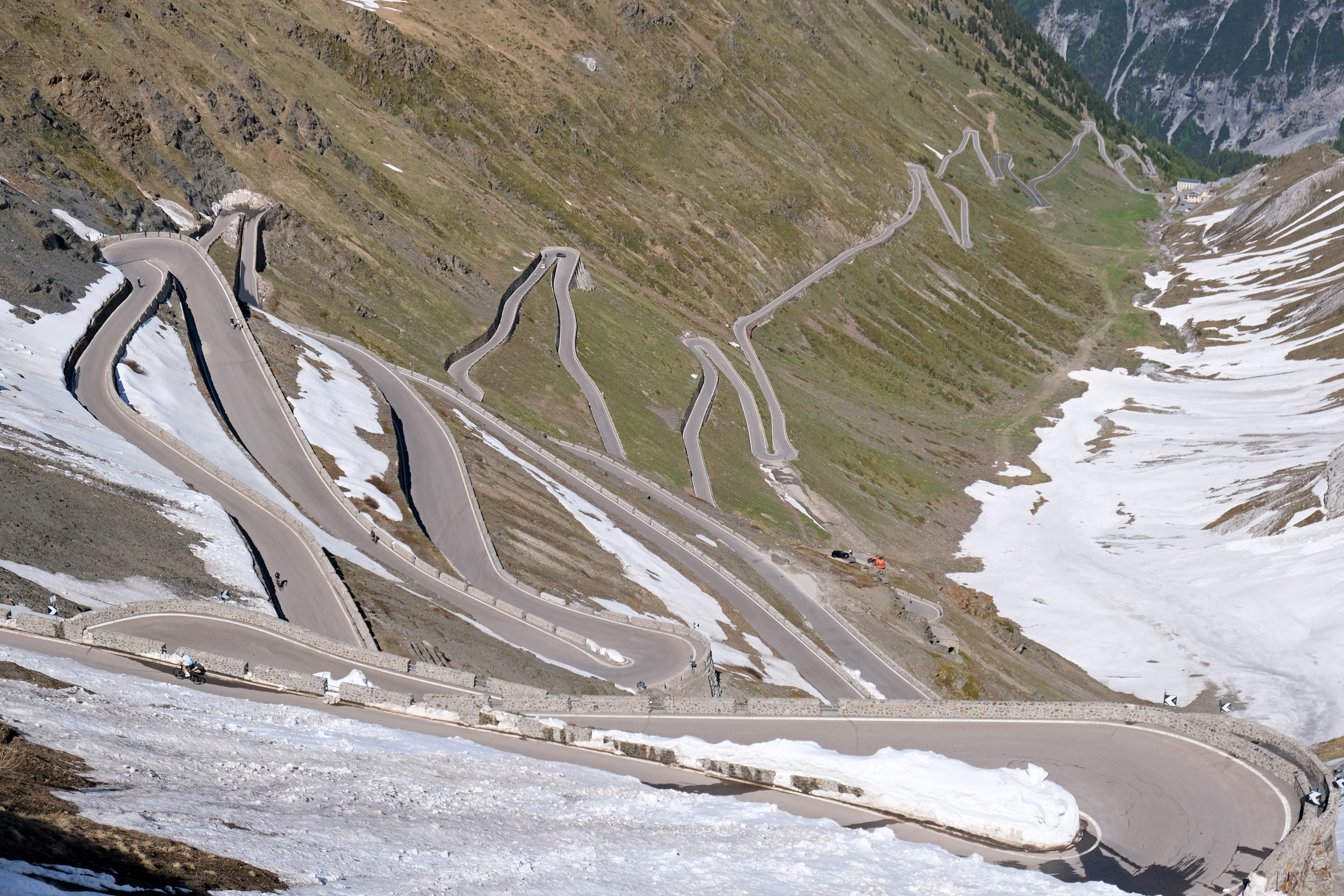
Some of the 48 hairpin turns near the top of the eastern ramp of the Passo dello Stelvio, which was planned to be the Cima Coppi of the 2013 Giro d'Italia, but was removed from the route (stage 19 was eventually cancelled) because of heavy snow and freezing temperatures.

Additionally, there was a points classification, awarding a red jersey. In the points classification, cyclists received points for finishing in the top 15 in a stage. Unlike in the better known points classification in the Tour de France, the type of stage has no effect on what points were on offer – each stage had the same points available on the same scale. The winner earned 25 points, second place earned 20 points, third 16, fourth 14, fifth 12, sixth 10, and one point fewer per place down to a single point for 15th. In addition, points could be won in intermediate sprints.

There was also a mountains classification, the leadership of which was marked by a blue jersey. In the mountains classifications, points were won by reaching the top of a climb before other cyclists. Each climb was categorized as either first, second, third, or fourth-category, with more points available for the higher-categorized climbs. The Cima Coppi, the race's highest point of elevation, was worth still more points than the other first-category climbs. Initially, the Cima Coppi was scheduled to be awarded at the top of the Passo dello Stelvio but, after the cancellation of the stage containing the climb, the Cima Coppi for the 2013 Giro d'Italia was the Tre Cime di Lavaredo, at 2,304 metres (7,559 ft).

The fourth jersey represents the young rider classification, marked by a white jersey. This was decided the same way as the general classification, but only riders born after 1 January 1988 were eligible.

There were also two classifications for teams. In the Trofeo Fast Team classification, the times of the best three cyclists per team on each stage were added; the leading team was the team with the lowest total time; the Trofeo Super Team was a team points classification, with the top 20 placed riders on each stage earning points (20 for first place, 19 for second place and so on, down to a single point for 20th) for their team.

The rows in the following table correspond to the jerseys awarded after that stage was run. In a break with the practice of recent years, defending Giro champion Ryder Hesjedal wore the pink jersey during the first stage.

Stage	Winner	General classification	Points classification	Mountains classification	Young rider classification	Trofeo Fast Team	Trofeo Super Team
1	Mark Cavendish	Mark Cavendish	Mark Cavendish	Giovanni Visconti	Elia Viviani	Orica–GreenEDGE	Orica–GreenEDGE
2	Team Sky	Salvatore Puccio	Mark Cavendish	Giovanni Visconti	Salvatore Puccio	Team Sky	Orica–GreenEDGE
3	Luca Paolini	Luca Paolini	Luca Paolini	Willem Wauters	Fabio Aru	Team Katusha	Team Katusha
4	Enrico Battaglin	Luca Paolini	Luca Paolini	Giovanni Visconti	Fabio Aru	Team Katusha	Team Katusha
5	John Degenkolb	Luca Paolini	Luca Paolini	Giovanni Visconti	Fabio Aru	Team Katusha	Team Katusha
6	Mark Cavendish	Luca Paolini	Mark Cavendish	Giovanni Visconti	Fabio Aru	Team Katusha	Team Katusha
7	Adam Hansen	Beñat Intxausti	Mark Cavendish	Giovanni Visconti	Rafał Majka	Team Katusha	Team Katusha
8	Alex Dowsett	Vincenzo Nibali	Mark Cavendish	Giovanni Visconti	Wilco Kelderman	Astana	Orica–GreenEDGE
9	Maxim Belkov	Vincenzo Nibali	Cadel Evans	Stefano Pirazzi	Wilco Kelderman	Blanco Pro Cycling	BMC Racing Team
10	Rigoberto Urán	Vincenzo Nibali	Cadel Evans	Stefano Pirazzi	Rafał Majka	Team Sky	Team Sky
11	Ramūnas Navardauskas	Vincenzo Nibali	Cadel Evans	Stefano Pirazzi	Rafał Majka	Team Sky	Team Sky
12	Mark Cavendish	Vincenzo Nibali	Mark Cavendish	Stefano Pirazzi	Rafał Majka	Team Sky	Team Sky
13	Mark Cavendish	Vincenzo Nibali	Mark Cavendish	Stefano Pirazzi	Rafał Majka	Team Sky	Team Sky
14	~~Mauro Santambrogio~~; Vincenzo Nibali	Vincenzo Nibali	Mark Cavendish	Stefano Pirazzi	Rafał Majka	Team Sky	Team Sky
15	Giovanni Visconti	Vincenzo Nibali	Mark Cavendish	Stefano Pirazzi	Carlos Betancur	Team Sky	Team Sky
16	Beñat Intxausti	Vincenzo Nibali	Mark Cavendish	Stefano Pirazzi	Carlos Betancur	Team Sky	Movistar Team
17	Giovanni Visconti	Vincenzo Nibali	Mark Cavendish	Stefano Pirazzi	Carlos Betancur	Team Sky	Movistar Team
18	Vincenzo Nibali	Vincenzo Nibali	Mark Cavendish	Stefano Pirazzi	Rafał Majka	Team Sky	Team Sky
19	Stage cancelled	Vincenzo Nibali	Mark Cavendish	Stefano Pirazzi	Rafał Majka	Team Sky	Team Sky
20	Vincenzo Nibali	Vincenzo Nibali	Vincenzo Nibali	Stefano Pirazzi	Carlos Betancur	Team Sky	Team Sky
21	Mark Cavendish	Vincenzo Nibali	Mark Cavendish	Stefano Pirazzi	Carlos Betancur	Team Sky	Movistar Team
Final		Vincenzo Nibali	Mark Cavendish	Stefano Pirazzi	Carlos Betancur	Team Sky	Movistar Team

Notes

- In stage 2, Nacer Bouhanni, who was third in the points classification, wore the red jersey, because Mark Cavendish (in first place) wore the pink jersey as leader of the general classification and Elia Viviani, who was second wore the white jersey as leader of the young rider classification.
- In stage 3, Alex Dowsett, who was second in the young rider classification, wore the white jersey, because Salvatore Puccio (in first place) wore the pink jersey as leader of the general classification during that stage.
- In stage 4, Mark Cavendish, who was second in the points classification, wore the red jersey, because Luca Paolini (in first place) wore the pink jersey as leader of the general classification during that stage. Also, Cadel Evans and John Degenkolb wore the red jersey for the same reason in stages 5, and 6, respectively. Cavendish also wore the red jersey in stage 21, despite being in second place, because Vincenzo Nibali (in first place) wore the pink jersey.

== Final standings ==
Legend
Pink jersey	Denotes the leader of the General classification	Green jersey	Denotes the leader of the Mountains classification
Red jersey	Denotes the leader of the Points classification	White jersey	Denotes the leader of the Young rider classification

=== General classification ===
	Rider	Team	Time
1	Vincenzo Nibali (ITA)	Astana	84h 53' 28"
2	Rigoberto Urán (COL)	Team Sky	+ 4' 43"
3	Cadel Evans (AUS)	BMC Racing Team	+ 5' 52"
4	Michele Scarponi (ITA)	Lampre–Merida	+ 6' 48"
5	Carlos Betancur (COL)	Ag2r–La Mondiale	+ 7' 28"
6	Przemysław Niemiec (POL)	Lampre–Merida	+ 7' 43"
7	Rafał Majka (POL)	Saxo–Tinkoff	+ 8' 09"
8	Beñat Intxausti (ESP)	Movistar Team	+ 10' 26"
9	~~Mauro Santambrogio (ITA)~~	~~Vini Fantini–Selle Italia~~	~~+ 10' 32"~~
10	Domenico Pozzovivo (ITA)	Ag2r–La Mondiale	+ 10' 59"

=== Points classification ===
	Rider	Team	Points
1	Mark Cavendish (GBR)	Omega Pharma–Quick-Step	158
2	Vincenzo Nibali (ITA)	Astana	128
3	Cadel Evans (AUS)	BMC Racing Team	111
4	Carlos Betancur (COL)	Ag2r–La Mondiale	108
5	Giovanni Visconti (ITA)	Movistar Team	105
6	Rigoberto Urán (COL)	Team Sky	102
7	~~Mauro Santambrogio (ITA)~~	~~Vini Fantini–Selle Italia~~	~~89~~
8	Elia Viviani (ITA)	Cannondale	88
9	Giacomo Nizzolo (ITA)	RadioShack–Leopard	75
10	Ramūnas Navardauskas (LTU)	Garmin–Sharp	65

=== Mountains classification ===
	Rider	Team	Points
1	Stefano Pirazzi (ITA)	Bardiani Valvole–CSF Inox	82
2	Vincenzo Nibali (ITA)	Astana	45
3	Giovanni Visconti (ITA)	Movistar Team	45
4	Jackson Rodríguez (VEN)	Androni Giocattoli–Venezuela	41
5	Carlos Betancur (COL)	Ag2r–La Mondiale	37
6	Robinson Chalapud (COL)	Colombia	31
7	Rigoberto Urán (COL)	Team Sky	26
8	~~Mauro Santambrogio (ITA)~~	~~Vini Fantini–Selle Italia~~	~~18~~
9	Fabio Duarte (COL)	Colombia	17
10	Pieter Weening (NED)	Orica–GreenEDGE	14

=== Young riders classification ===
	Rider	Team	Time
1	Carlos Betancur (COL)	Ag2r–La Mondiale	85h 00' 56"
2	Rafał Majka (POL)	Saxo–Tinkoff	+ 41"
3	Wilco Kelderman (NED)	Blanco Pro Cycling	+ 12' 50"
4	Darwin Atapuma (COL)	Colombia	+ 21' 28"
5	Diego Rosa (ITA)	Androni Giocattoli–Venezuela	+ 32' 55"
6	Fabio Aru (ITA)	Astana	+ 1h 17' 25"
7	Fabio Felline (ITA)	Androni Giocattoli–Venezuela	+ 1h 23' 31"
8	Jarlinson Pantano (COL)	Colombia	+ 1h 28' 09"
9	Thomas Damuseau (FRA)	Argos–Shimano	+ 1h 35' 26"
10	Francesco Manuel Bongiorno (ITA)	Bardiani Valvole–CSF Inox	+ 2h 04' 36"

=== Trofeo Fast Team classification ===
	Team	Time
1	(United Kingdom) Team Sky	254h 34′ 25″
2	(Kazakhstan) Astana	+ 4' 29"
3	(Spain) Movistar Team	+ 7' 27"
4	(Italy) Lampre–Merida	+ 10' 35"
5	(Netherlands) Blanco Pro Cycling	+ 15' 58"
6	(France) Ag2r–La Mondiale	+ 24' 59"
7	(Italy) Androni Giocattoli–Venezuela	+ 39' 16"
8	(Spain) Euskaltel–Euskadi	+ 55' 42"
9	(United States) BMC Racing Team	+ 1h 03' 24"
10	(Russia) Team Katusha	+ 1h 08' 43"

=== Trofeo Super Team classification ===
	Team	Points
1	(Spain) Movistar Team	281
2	(United Kingdom) Team Sky	276
3	(France) Ag2r–La Mondiale	273
4	(Italy) Lampre–Merida	268
5	(Kazakhstan) Astana	265
6	(United States) BMC Racing Team	232
7	(Russia) Team Katusha	196
8	(Italy) Vini Fantini–Selle Italia	195
9	(Luxembourg) RadioShack–Leopard	194
10	(Italy) Bardiani Valvole–CSF Inox	181

=== Minor classifications ===
Other less well-known classifications, whose leaders did not receive a special jersey, were awarded during the Giro. These awards were based on points earned throughout the three weeks of the tour. Each mass-start stage had two intermediate sprints, the Traguardi Volante, or T.V. The T.V. sprints gave bonus seconds towards the general classification, points towards the regular points classification, and also points towards the T.V. classification. This award was known by various names in previous years, and was previously time-based. It was won by Brazilian Rafael Andriato of the Vini Fantini–Selle Italia team. Andriato also won the Premio della Fuga, which rewarded riders who took part in a breakaway at the head of the field. Each rider in an escape of ten or fewer riders received one point for each kilometre that the group stayed clear.

Other awards included the Combativity classification, which was a compilation of points gained for position on crossing intermediate sprints, mountain passes and stage finishes. Points classification winner Mark Cavendish won this award. The Azzurri d'Italia classification was based on finishing order, but points were awarded only to the top three finishers in each stage. It was likewise won, like the closely associated points classification, by Cavendish. Teams were given penalty points for minor technical infringements. Cannondale were the only team to avoid being penalised altogether over the course of the race, and so won the Fair Play classification.
