= Mauro Santambrogio =

Italian cyclist

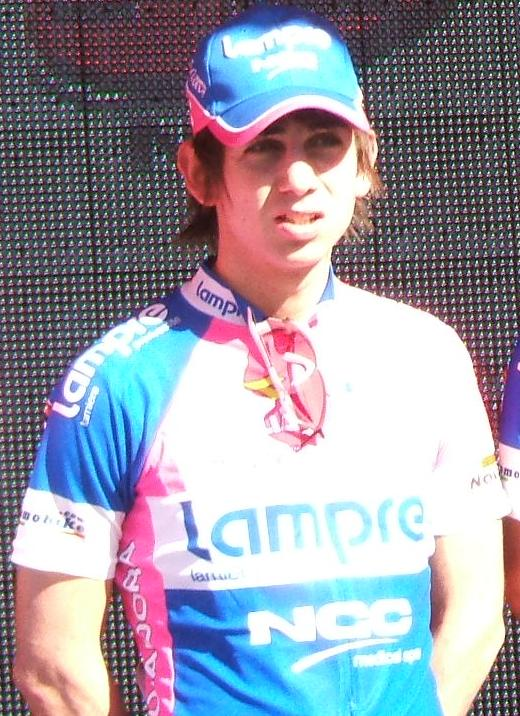

Personal information
- Full name: Mauro Santambrogio
- Nickname: Santa
- Born: 7 October 1984 (age 42) Erba, Italy
- Height: 1.73 m (5 ft 8 in)
- Weight: 63 kg (139 lb; 9.9 st)

Cycling career
- Sport: Cycling
- Current team: Retired
- Discipline: Road
- Role: Rider
- Rider type: Climber

Professional teams
- 2004–2005: LPR-Piacenza
- 2006–2009: Lampre–Fondital
- 2010–2012: BMC Racing Team
- 2013: Vini Fantini–Selle Italia
- 2015: Amore & Vita–Selle SMP

Major wins
- One-day races and Classics Tre Valli Varesine (2009) Other Trittico Lombardo (2009)

Mauro Santambrogio (born 7 October 1984 in Erba) is a former Italian professional road racing cyclist, who last rode for UCI Continental team Amore & Vita–Selle SMP.

== Career ==
Until 2009, Santambrogio rode for Lampre–NGC, and after the 2009 season he changed to BMC Racing Team. In 2010, he was mentioned in the Mantova doping investigation, and was sidelined for a few days by his team; he was again sidelined in 2011 when new evidence showed up.

After leaving BMC at the end of the 2012 season, Santambrogio joined Vini Fantini–Selle Italia. He made an excellent start to the season, including finishing 6th overall in Tour de San Luis, 7th overall in Tirreno–Adriatico and winning the GP Industria & Artigianato di Larciano in pouring rain. He was clear of the group with Patrik Sinkewitz, when Sinkewitz crashed at a right turn with 2 km (1.2 mi) to go. Santambrogio then soloed his way to victory. Santambrogio then finished 2nd overall in Giro del Trentino. At the Giro d'Italia, Santambrogio won Stage 14 after attacking with race leader Vincenzo Nibali, to rise to fourth overall, and just one second off the final podium place occupied by Rigoberto Urán. However, Santambrogio's form collapsed and he eventually finished 9th overall. Santambrogio's surprising performances had caused rumours amongst the peloton of doping from early in the race.

=== Doping ===
On 3 June 2013, it was announced that Santambrogio had tested positive for erythropoietin (EPO) after the first stage of the 2013 Giro d'Italia. This came just a few weeks after teammate Danilo Di Luca was thrown out of the Giro for testing positive for the same substance. Santambrogio was also sacked by the team. Santambrogio was suspended by the UCI until 2 November 2014.

On 22 October 2014, Santambrogio tested positive for testosterone and was suspended for three years. Santambrogio said he would not seek to return once his suspension has been served.

== Career achievements ==
=== Major results ===
2004
2nd Tour du lac Leman
5th Stausee-Rundfahrt Klingnau
8th GP della Costa Etruschi
2005
1st Giro del Lago Maggiore (GP Knorr)
3rd Road race, Mediterranean Games
3rd Giro del Mendrisiotto
5th Memorial Cimurri
7th Coppa Sabatini
7th Coppa Placci
2009
1st Overall Tre Valli Varesine
2nd Coppa Ugo Agostoni
8th Overall Tour Down Under
2010
2nd Coppa Ugo Agostoni
5th GP Ouest–France
8th Giro di Lombardia
2011
2nd Giro della Toscana
2012
4th Giro di Lombardia
6th Clásica de San Sebastián
6th Gran Piemonte
2013
1st GP Industria & Artigianato di Larciano
2nd Overall Giro del Trentino
3rd Trofeo Laigueglia
5th Gran Premio Città di Camaiore
6th Overall Tour de San Luis
7th Overall Tirreno–Adriatico

=== Grand Tour general classification results timeline ===
Grand Tour	2008	2009	2010	2011	2012	2013
Giro d'Italia	DNF	—	DNF	DNF	86	DSQ
Tour de France	—	132	DNF	—	—	—
Vuelta a España	121	—	—	88	58	—

Legend
—	Did not compete
DNF	Did not finish
