= Legion of the Lost =

2005 novel by Jaime Salazar

Legion of the Lost: The True Experience of an American in the French Foreign Legion
- First edition
- Author: Jaime Salazar
- Language: English
- Genre: autobiographical novel
- Publisher: Berkley Books
- Publication date: August 2, 2005
- Publication place: United States
- Media type: Print
- Pages: 256
- ISBN: 0425210154
- Website: legionofthelost.com

Legion of the Lost is an autobiographical novel by Jaime Salazar. It was published in the United States by Berkley Books, an imprint of Penguin Group, on August 2, 2005. It is based on Salazar's experience as an American in the French Foreign Legion; he enlisted in 1999 before deserting less than a year later. Salazar, a disillusioned American with a mechanical engineering degree, joins the Legion seeking a different path and a sense of purpose. The book follows his brutal training, his competitive nature, and his eventual disillusionment.

== Reception ==
New York Times reviewer William Grimes described the novel as an "improbable, very funny tale." "Salazar," Grimes wrote, "has a sly, sardonic sense of humor and a gift for understatement".
