= Valloire =

Valloire Valouère/Vârouère (Savoyard)
- Commune
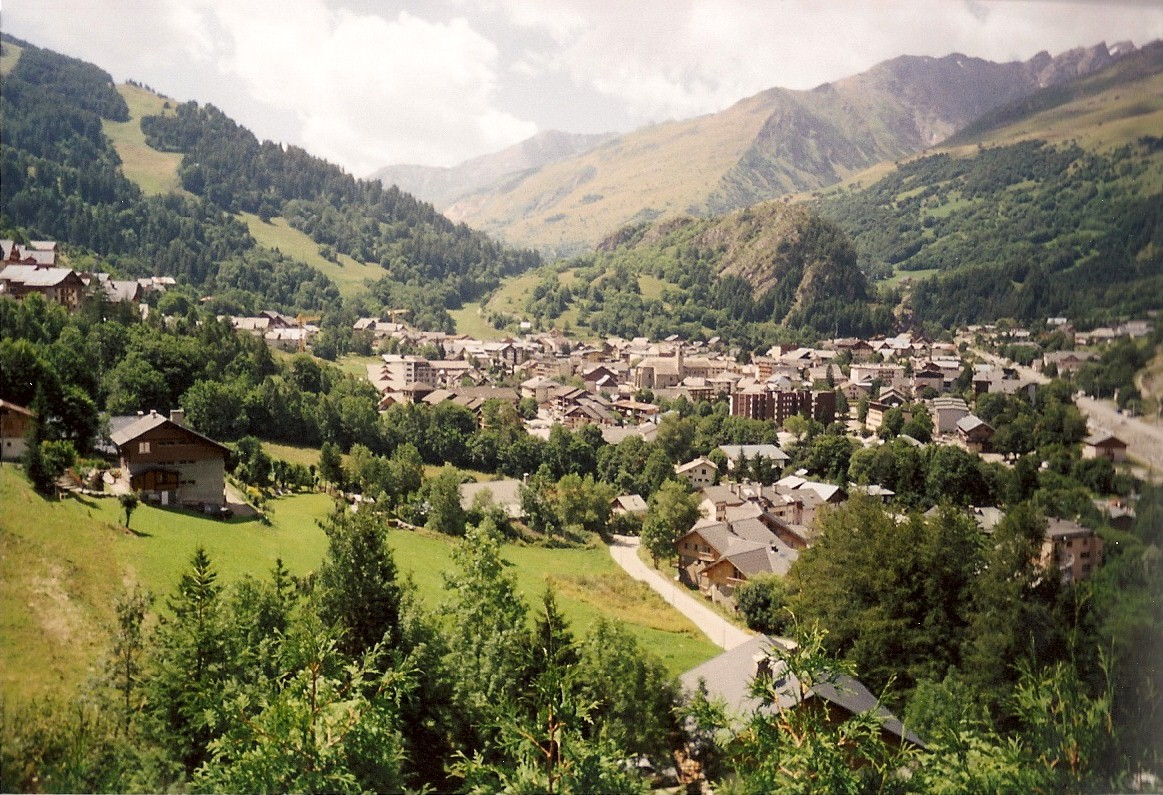
- A general view of Valloire
- Location of Valloire
- Location within France Location within Auvergne-Rhône-Alpes
- Coordinates: 45°09′57″N 6°25′45″E
- Country: France
- Region: Auvergne-Rhône-Alpes
- Department: Savoie
- Arrondissement: Saint-Jean-de-Maurienne
- Canton: Modane
- Intercommunality: Maurienne-Galibier

Government
  - Mayor (2020–2026): Jean-Pierre Rougeaux
- Area^{1}: 137.48 km^{2} (53.08 sq mi)
- Highest elevation: 3,504 m (11,496 ft)
- Lowest elevation: 694 m (2,277 ft)
- Population (2023): 1,064
  - Density: 7.739/km^{2} (20.04/sq mi)
- Time zone: UTC+01:00 (CET)
  - Summer (DST): UTC+02:00 (CEST)
- INSEE/Postal code: 73306 /73450
- Website: Valloire.net
- ^{1} French Land Register data, which excludes lakes, ponds, glaciers > 1 km^{2} (0.386 sq mi or 247 acres) and river estuaries.

Valloire-Galibier

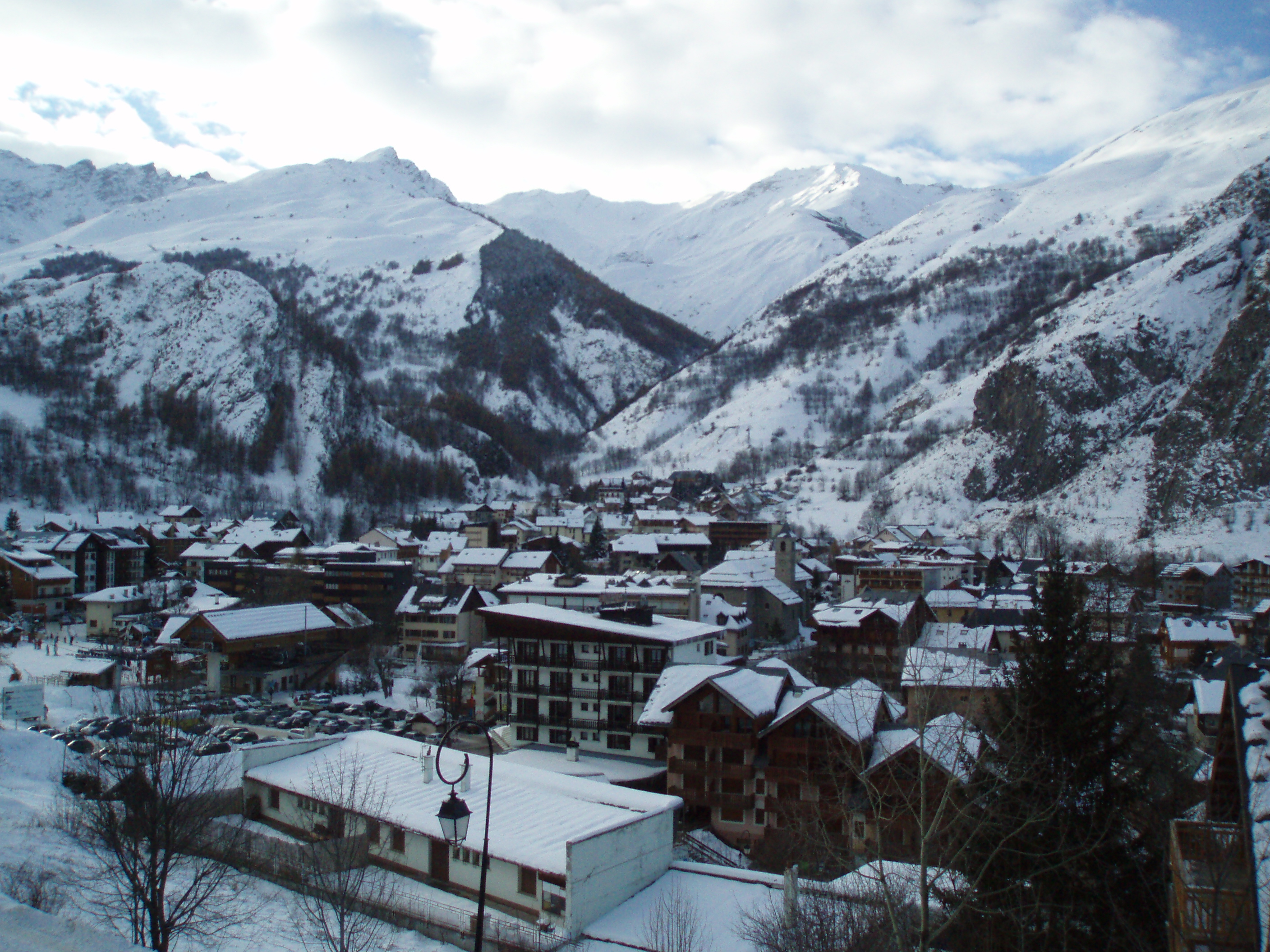
- Image of valloire village and two of its mountains, la Setaz and le Crey Du Quart
- Interactive map of Valloire-Galibier
- Location: Valloire, France
- Nearest city: St Jean de Maurienne, France
- Top elevation: 3,000 m (9,800 ft)
- Trails: 80
- Website: http://www.valloire.net/fr/hiver/

Valloire ([valwaʁ]; Savoyard: Valouère [vaˈlwɛːʁ] or Vârouère [vaˈrwɛːʁə]) is a commune in the Savoie department in the Auvergne-Rhône-Alpes region in south-eastern France.

The ski resort Valloire-Galibier is located in the commune, at the foot of the Col du Télégraphe and next to the ski resort of Valmeinier (the Alps) France.

70% of the Valloire/Valmeinier ski area is above 2,000 m (6,600 ft). It offers over 150 km of slopes, 33 lifts (two gondolas, 17 chairlift and 14 drag lifts), and 85 slopes (21 Green, 25 Blue, 31 Red and 6 Black). There is also a considerable amount of backcountry skiing available.

Valloire has two main skiing areas which can be accessed by lifts from the village. They are the Sétaz and the Crey du Quart. From the Crey du Quart, one can ski across to Valmeinier, which is included in the ski pass. The Crey du Quart also houses a large snowpark (with a dedicated daily ticket only for this park) which is designed to offer something to people of all skill levels. In the Arva Parc on the Sétaz one can learn how to rescue avalanche victims. The French Foreign Legion has a mountain outpost at Valloire Les Verneys and teaches beginning legionnaires on the slopes. Jaime Salazar dedicated a chapter in his 2005 Foreign Legion memoir Legion of the Lost to the severe mountain course in Valloire.

It is a traditional village known for its après-ski and restaurants. The resort includes two ski schools, École du Ski Français, which is the largest ski school company in France, and Ecole du Ski Internationale.

It is located in the Savoie region, with good transport links in and out of Modane, Lyon, Geneva and Chambery.

Valloire is known as an art resort. Since 1984, it has been organizing the International Competition of Ice Sculptures and Snow Sculptures around January 18 each year.

== Toponymy ==
The name of the locality is attested as Valloire in 1793, and as both Valoires and Valloire from 1801.

The etymology of Valloire is debated. The most common explanation derives the name from Latin Vallis Aurea, meaning “golden valley”. In this interpretation, the “gold” does not refer to the metal, but probably to the favorable exposure of the valley, which made cultivation particularly productive. This may partly explain why the population exceeded 3,000 inhabitants in the 17th century.

In Savoyard, the name of the commune is written Vârouère and pronounced [vaˈrwɛːʁə]. Outside the commune, the forms Vâlouère, pronounced [vaˈlwɛːʁ], and Valouère in the semi-phonetic Conflans orthography, are also found.

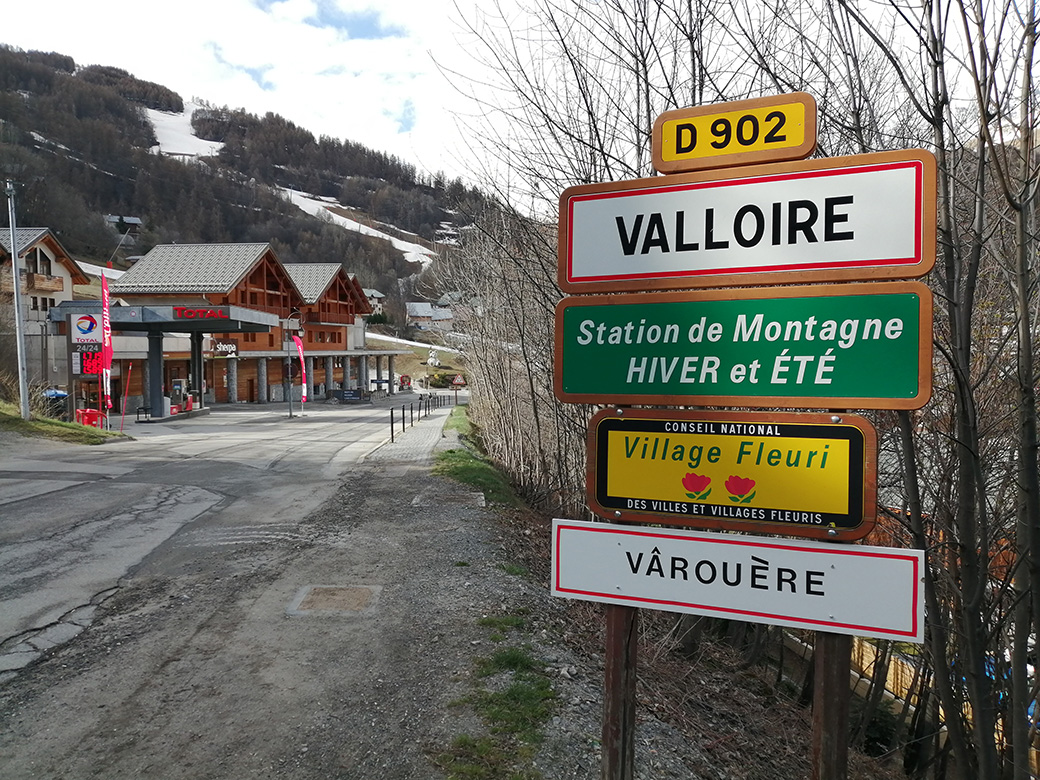
"Popular" settlement entrance sign in French and Arpitan

== History ==
During the early 1930s, Valloire was a simple village, void of tourism. In 1935–36, the first ski club arrived, Le Ski club de Paris. New hotels and an ice skating rink were opened. In the next two years, Valloire constructed its first ski lift. By 1945, it had added another five lifts. In 1970 Valloire expanded from the Sétaz and began developing the Crey du Quart. Four years later, Valloire and Valmeinier joined together to form one ski resort.

In 1989 the first snow cannons were unveiled, allowing for a more lengthy tourism season. Similar progress was made until 2007, when Valloire switched from conventional ski passes to "hands-free" ones, embedded with a chip.

Valloire has gained fame as the home of Jean-Baptiste Grange, a slalom World Cup winner.

In 2024 the Tour de France had a finish in Valloire in the fourth stage.

== Geography ==
=== Climate ===
Valloire has a humid continental climate (Köppen climate classification Dfb) closely bordering on an oceanic climate (Cfb). The average annual temperature in Valloire is 7.0 °C (44.6 °F). The average annual rainfall is 793.6 mm (31.24 in) with November as the wettest month. The temperatures are highest on average in July, at around 15.4 °C (59.7 °F), and lowest in January, at around −0.7 °C (30.7 °F). The highest temperature ever recorded in Valloire was 33.1 °C (91.6 °F) on 28 July 2013; the coldest temperature ever recorded was −23.0 °C (−9.4 °F) on 5 February 2012.

Climate data for Valloire (1991−2020 normals, extremes 1991−present)
Month	Jan	Feb	Mar	Apr	May	Jun	Jul	Aug	Sep	Oct	Nov	Dec	Year
Record high °C (°F)	16.8 (62.2)	17.6 (63.7)	19.5 (67.1)	23.8 (74.8)	29.4 (84.9)	32.5 (90.5)	33.1 (91.6)	32.6 (90.7)	27.3 (81.1)	27.5 (81.5)	20.2 (68.4)	16.8 (62.2)	33.1 (91.6)
Mean daily maximum °C (°F)	3.7 (38.7)	4.2 (39.6)	8.0 (46.4)	11.5 (52.7)	15.5 (59.9)	19.3 (66.7)	21.6 (70.9)	21.2 (70.2)	16.8 (62.2)	12.8 (55.0)	7.2 (45.0)	4.2 (39.6)	12.2 (54.0)
Daily mean °C (°F)	−0.7 (30.7)	−0.5 (31.1)	2.8 (37.0)	6.2 (43.2)	9.9 (49.8)	13.4 (56.1)	15.4 (59.7)	15.3 (59.5)	11.4 (52.5)	7.9 (46.2)	2.9 (37.2)	0.0 (32.0)	7.0 (44.6)
Mean daily minimum °C (°F)	−5.2 (22.6)	−5.3 (22.5)	−2.4 (27.7)	0.9 (33.6)	4.4 (39.9)	7.5 (45.5)	9.2 (48.6)	9.3 (48.7)	6.0 (42.8)	3.0 (37.4)	−1.3 (29.7)	−4.2 (24.4)	1.8 (35.2)
Record low °C (°F)	−19.6 (−3.3)	−23.0 (−9.4)	−18.6 (−1.5)	−9.6 (14.7)	−4.9 (23.2)	−3.1 (26.4)	0.2 (32.4)	−0.3 (31.5)	−5.1 (22.8)	−9.8 (14.4)	−14.9 (5.2)	−18.2 (−0.8)	−23.0 (−9.4)
Average precipitation mm (inches)	70.2 (2.76)	52.5 (2.07)	55.5 (2.19)	51.6 (2.03)	71.8 (2.83)	65.1 (2.56)	62.5 (2.46)	67.0 (2.64)	63.8 (2.51)	72.5 (2.85)	82.0 (3.23)	79.1 (3.11)	793.6 (31.24)
Average precipitation days (≥ 1.0 mm)	8.8	7.6	7.9	8.8	11.2	10.3	8.6	8.9	8.2	8.4	9.5	8.9	107.1
Source: Météo-France

== See also ==
- Communes of the Savoie department
