= List of highways numbered 9 =

Route 9, or Highway 9, may refer to:

== International ==
- E09 European route E09
- E009 European route E009

== Albania ==
- SH-9 Road in Albania.

== Argentina ==
- National Route 9

== Australia ==
=== New South Wales ===
- A9 (Sydney)

=== South Australia ===
  - Port River Expressway
  - Salisbury Highway
  - John Rice Avenue

=== Tasmania ===
- Arthur Highway, Tasmania

== Austria ==
- Pyhrn Autobahn

== Belarus ==
- M 9

== Bulgaria ==
- I-9 road (Bulgaria)

== Canada ==
- Alberta Highway 9
- British Columbia Highway 9
- Manitoba Highway 9
- Ontario Highway 9
- Prince Edward Island Route 9
- Quebec Route 9 (former)
- Saskatchewan Highway 9
- Yukon Highway 9

== Czech Republic ==
- I/9 Highway; Czech: Silnice I/9

== Denmark ==
- Danish national road 9

== Djibouti ==
- RN-9 (Djibouti)

== Finland ==
- Finnish national road 9

== Germany ==
- Bundesautobahn 9

== Greece ==
- A9 motorway (old number for the Patras bypass, now part of the A5)
- EO9 road

== Hong Kong ==
- Route 9 (Hong Kong)

== Hungary ==
- M9 expressway (Hungary)

== India ==
- National Highway 9 (India)

== Indonesia ==
- Indonesian National Route 9

== Iran ==
- Freeway 9 (Iran)

== Iraq ==
- Highway 9 (Iraq)

== Ireland ==
- M9 motorway (Republic of Ireland)
- N9 road (Ireland)

== Israel ==
- Highway 9 (Israel)

== Italy ==
- Autostrada A9
- RA 9

== Japan ==
- National Route 9
- Kyoto Jūkan Expressway
- San'in Expressway
- San'in Kinki Expressway

== Korea, South ==
- National Route 9

== Malaysia ==
- Sungai Besi Expressway
- FT 9 Malaysia Federal Route 9
- B9 Selangor State Route B9
- J9 Johor State Route J9
- N9 Negeri Sembilan State Route N9

== Nigeria ==
- A9 highway (Nigeria)

== Norway ==
- Norwegian National Road 9

== Paraguay ==
- National Route 9

== Philippines ==
- N9 highway (Philippines)

== Russia ==
- M9 highway (Russia)

== Sweden ==
- Swedish national road 9

== Thailand ==
- Kanchanaphisek Road (Motorway 9)

== United States ==
- Interstate 9 (proposed)
- U.S. Route 9
- New England Interstate Route 9 (former)
- Alabama State Route 9
  - County Route 9 (Lee County, Alabama)
- Alaska Route 9
- Arkansas Highway 9
- California State Route 9
- Colorado State Highway 9
- Connecticut Route 9
- Delaware Route 9
- Florida State Road 9
- Georgia State Route 9
- Idaho State Highway 9
- Illinois Route 9
- Indiana State Road 9
- Iowa Highway 9
- K-9 (Kansas highway)
- Kentucky Route 9
- Louisiana Highway 9
- Maine State Route 9
- Massachusetts Route 9
  - Massachusetts Route C9 (former)
- M-9 (Michigan highway) (former)
- Minnesota State Highway 9
- Mississippi Highway 9
- Missouri Route 9
  - Missouri Route 9 (1922) (former)
- Nebraska Highway 9
- Nevada State Route 9 (former)
- New Hampshire Route 9
- New Jersey Route 9 (former)
- New Mexico State Road 9
- New York State Route 9 (1924–1927) (former)
  - County Route 9 (Suffolk County, New York)
- North Carolina Highway 9
- North Dakota Highway 9
- Ohio State Route 9
- Oklahoma State Highway 9
- Pennsylvania Route 9 (former)
- South Carolina Highway 9
- South Dakota Highway 9 (former)
- Tennessee State Route 9
- Texas State Highway 9
  - Texas State Highway Loop 9
  - Texas State Highway Spur 9
  - Farm to Market Road 9
  - Texas Recreational Road 9
- Utah State Route 9
- Vermont Route 9
- Virginia State Route 9
- Washington State Route 9
  - Primary State Highway 9 (Washington) (former)
- West Virginia Route 9

- Guam Highway 9
- Puerto Rico Highway 9

== Uruguay ==
- Route 9 Gral. Leonardo Olivera

== Vietnam ==
- National Route 9 (Vietnam)

== Zambia ==
- Lusaka–Mongu Road

== See also ==
- List of A9 roads
- List of highways numbered 9A
- List of highways numbered 9B
- List of highways numbered 9E
- List of highways numbered 9W

Preceded by 8	Lists of highways 9	Succeeded by 10
