= E9 =

E9 or E-9 may refer to:

== Roads and trails ==
- European route E09
- European walking route E9
- E9, the Besraya Expressway in Malaysia
- Kyoto Jūkan Expressway, San'in Kinki Expressway and San'in Expressway, route E9 in Japan

== Vehicles ==
- BMW E9, a two-door coupé built for BMW by Karmann from 1968 to 1975
- EMD E9, a diesel locomotive
- E-9A Widget, U.S. Air Force range control aircraft

== Other uses ==
- E9 (countries) a forum of nine highly populated countries
- E9 (Lie algebra) (E_{9}), another name for the infinite dimensional affine Lie algebra
- E9 tuning, a common tuning for steel guitar necks of more than six strings
- E9, a baseball scorekeeping abbreviation for an error on the right fielder
- E9, a postcode district in the E postcode area of the London postal district
- Boston-Maine Airways IATA code
- E-9, a U.S. uniformed services pay grade

== See also ==
- 9E (disambiguation)
