= Ōyamazaki Tile Kiln Site =

Archaeological site in Japan

Ōyamazaki Tile Kiln ruins
- 大山崎瓦窯跡 (Japanese)
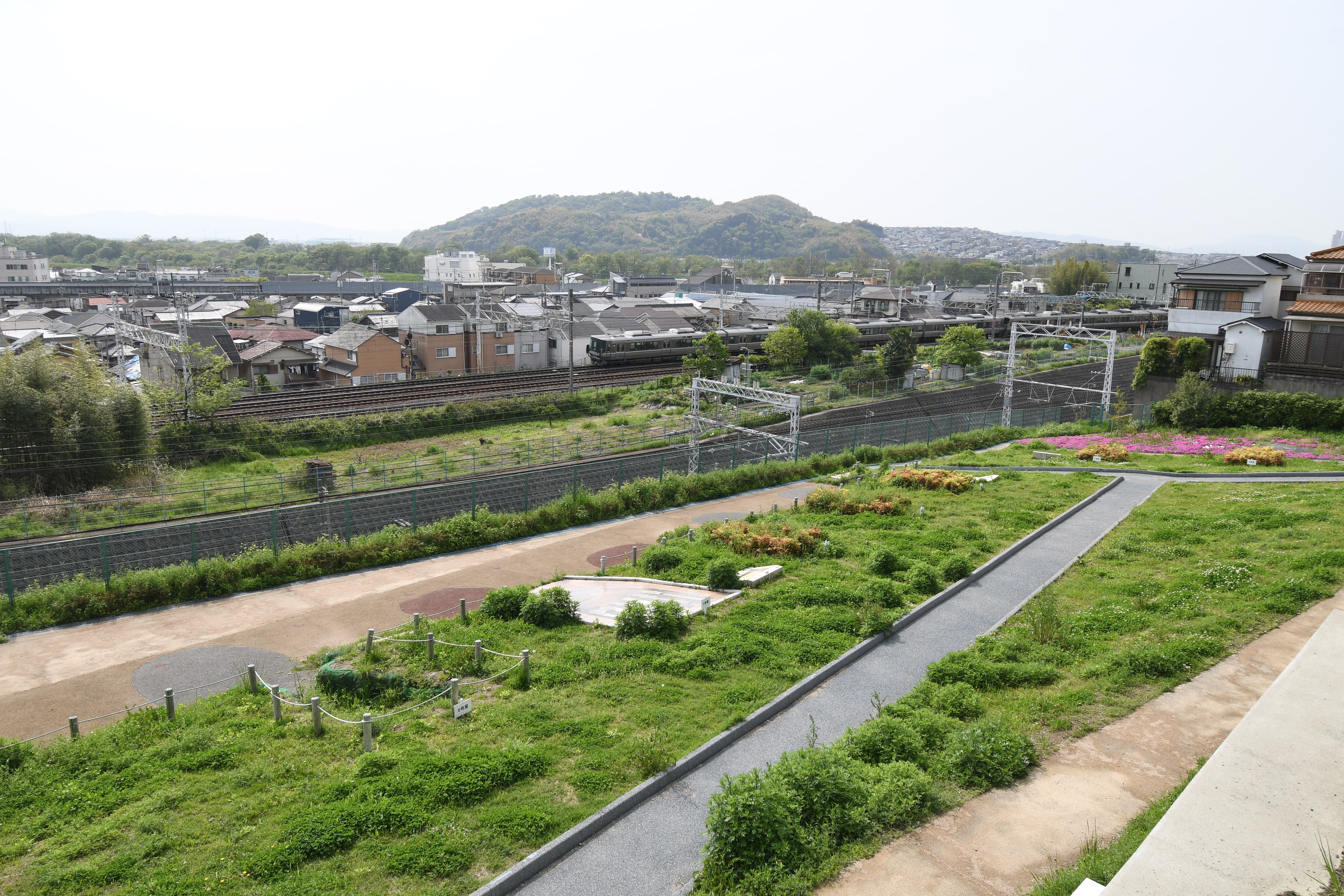
- Ōyamazaki Tile Kiln ruins

- Ōyamazaki Tile Kiln ruins Ōyamazaki Tile Kiln Site (Japan)
- Interactive map of Ōyamazaki Tile Kiln ruins
- 34°53′47″N 135°41′00″E
- Periods: early Heian period
- Location: Ōyamazaki, Kyoto, Japan
- Region: Kinai region

Site notes
- Public access: Yes (public park)

The Ōyamazaki Tile Kiln ruins (大山崎瓦窯跡, Ōyamazaki kawara gama ato) is an archaeological site with the ruins of an early Heian period kiln, located in the town of Ōyamazaki, Otokuni District, Kyoto Prefecture in the Kinai region of Japan. It was designated a National Historic Site of Japan in 2006.

== Overview ==
Kawara (瓦) roof tiles made of fired clay were introduced to Japan from Baekche during the 6th century along with Buddhism. During the 570s under the reign of Emperor Bidatsu, the king of Baekche sent six people to Japan skilled in various aspects of Buddhism, including a temple architect. Initially, tiled roofs were a sign of great wealth and prestige, and used for temple and government buildings. The material had the advantages of great strength and durability, and could also be made at locations around the country wherever clay was available.

The Ōyamazaki Tile Kiln was located in the southwestern tip of Kyoto Prefecture, at a strategic point for water and land transportation. Its existence was discovered during the construction of a residential are. The kiln was in operation during the early Heian period and fired roof tiles for the palaces and other governmental structures of Heian-kyō. At that time, many tile kilns around Heian-kyō produced large quantities of roof tiles to support the construction of the new capital of Japan, and this tile kiln was one of those government-run tile kilns. During archaeological excavations conducted in 2006, six flat kilns and numerous pits were confirmed, and subsequent excavations found six more kilns.Groups A and B consist of five kilns each, and group C consists of two kilns. Groups A and B are located in an “L” shape, and groups A and C are located in a straight line. The kilns were spaced approximately 6 meters apart. Each kiln was divided into a combustion chamber for burning firewood and a firing chamber for baking tiles, and in front of the combustion chamber was a vestibule that served as a workshop. In the front, there was a field of ash where ashes from firing and failed roof tiles were discarded. The scale of all kilns is unified and standardized to ensure a constant production volume. It took around five days to produce the roof tiles, after which the kiln needed repairs. The reason for the uniform arrangement of kilns is thought to have been to ensure seamless production by firing tiles and repairing kilns in groups.The Ōyamazaki kilns produced round and flat roof tiles with lotus and arabesque patterns for decorating the eaves, flat tiles for the ridgeline and Onigawara tiles for the ridge ends. .To the northwest of the tile kiln ruins is the temple of Yamazaki Shoten (Kannon-ji), a scenic spot with views to the east, northeast, and southwest, overlooking the ruins of Nagaoka-kyō, the Yodo River, and Otokoyama.

The remains have been backfilled for protection, but the area has been developed as a park, and reconstruction of kilns are displayed. The site is about 15 minutes walk from Yamazaki Station on the JR West Tokaido Main Line.

== See also ==
- List of Historic Sites of Japan (Kyoto)
