= Midōsuji =

Street in Osaka, Japan

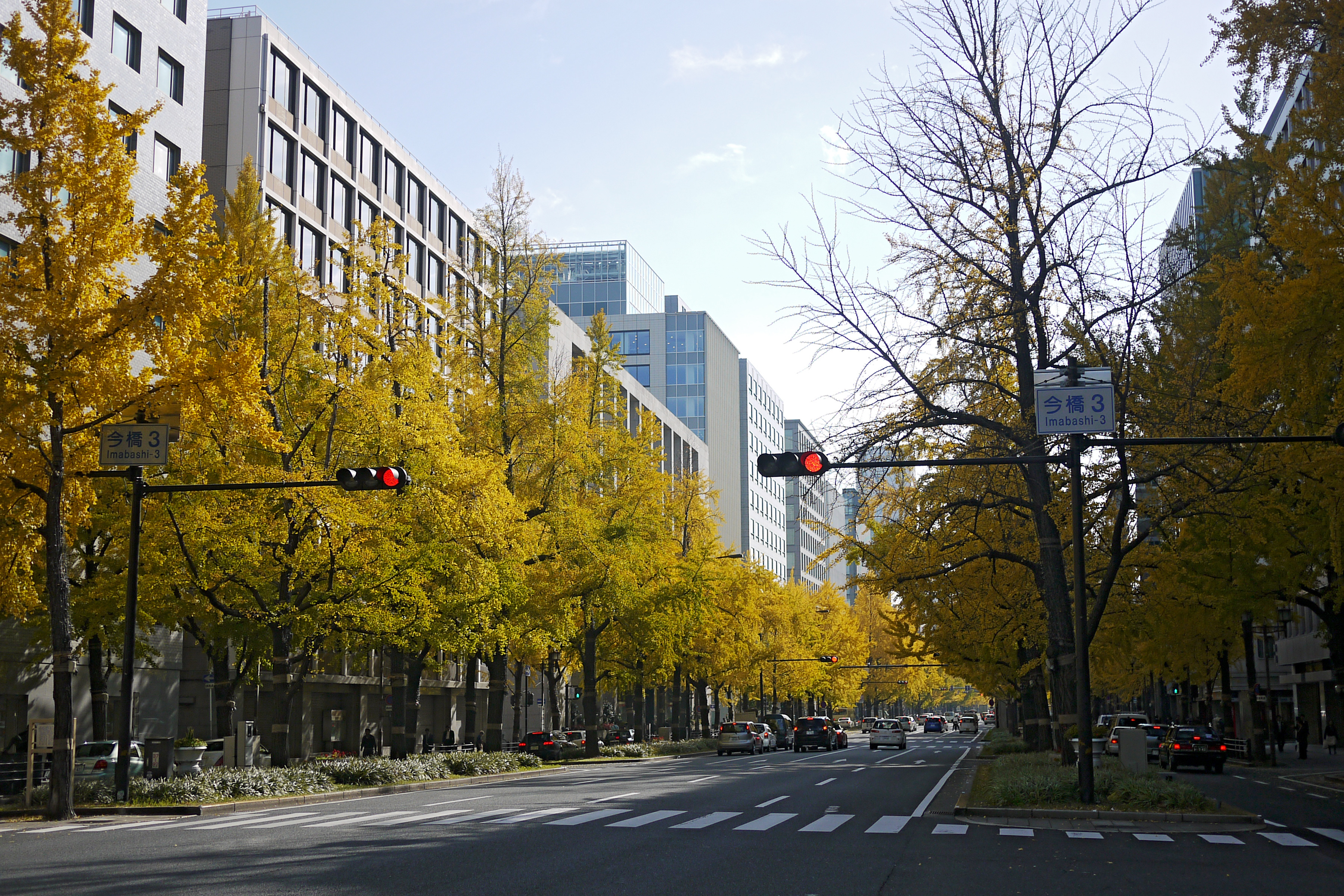
- Autumn colors along Midōsuji
- Former name: Yodoyabashisuji (淀屋橋筋)
- Length: 4.027 km (2.502 mi)
- Width: 43.6 metres (143 ft)
- Location: Osaka (Umeda, Nakanoshima, Shinsaibashi, Dōtonbori, Ame-mura, and Namba)
- South end: National Route 25 north in Namba
- Major junctions: National Route 172 in Chūō-ku; National Route 308 in Shinsaibashi
- North end: National Route 176 / National Route 423 in Kita-ku

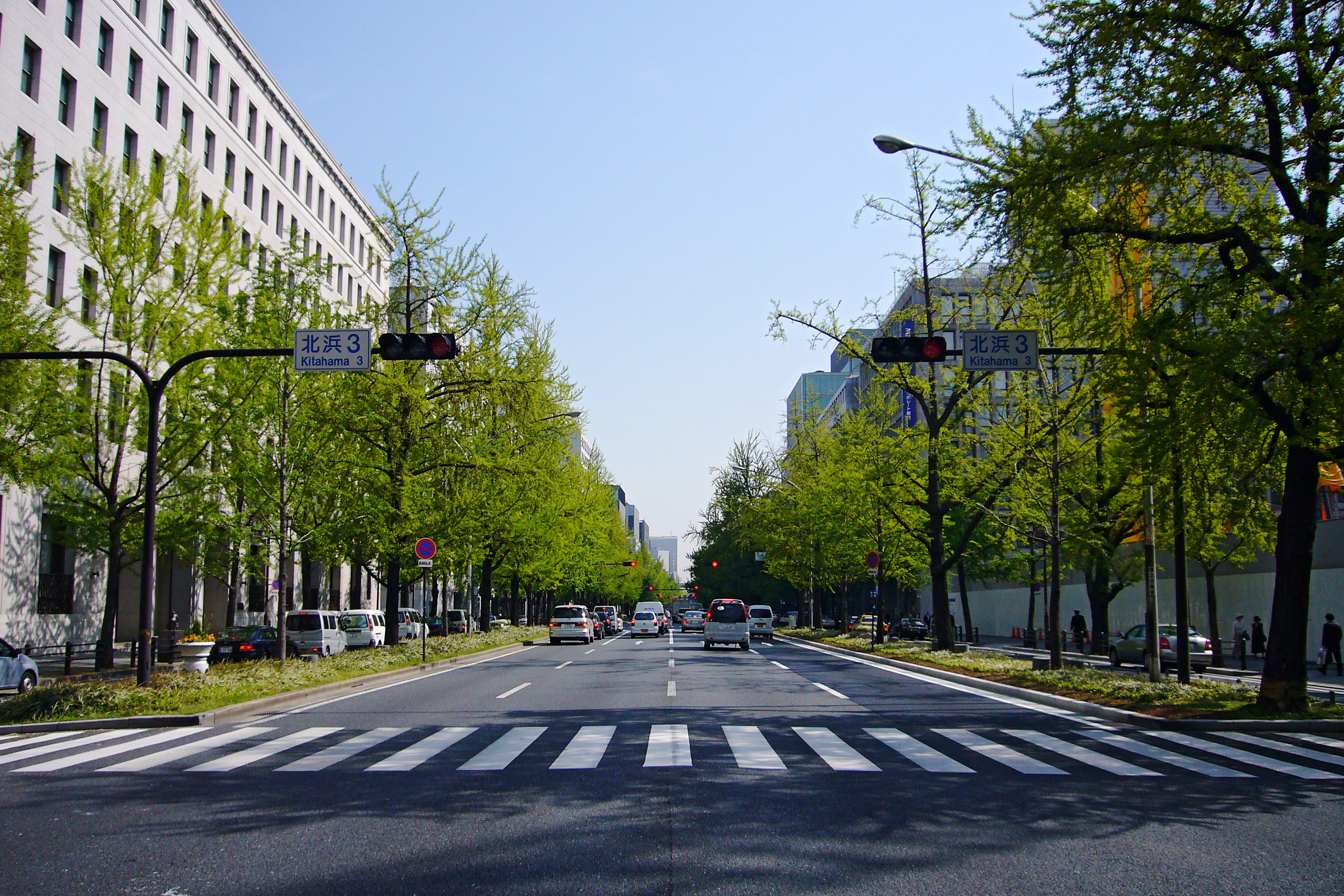
Yodoyabashi intersection of Midōsuji

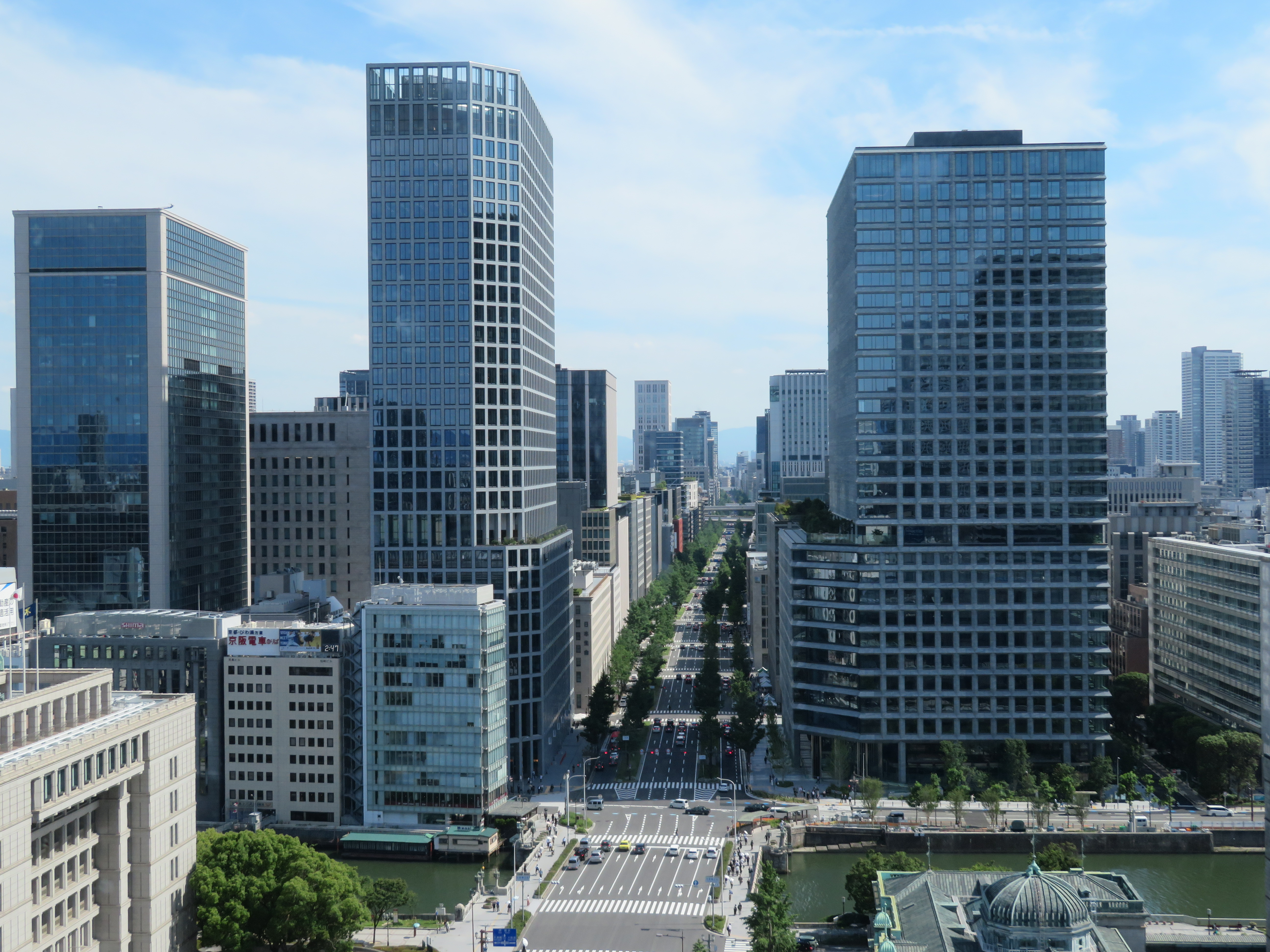
Yodoyabashi intersection of Midōsuji

Midōsuji (御堂筋, Midō-suji) Avenue is the primary main street in central Osaka, Japan. It runs north-south, passing Umeda, Nakanoshima, Shinsaibashi, Dōtonbori, Ame-mura, and Namba districts. Underneath the street is the Midōsuji Line subway. Especially in autumn when leaves of the ginkgo roadside trees turn yellow, a beautiful landscape can be seen.

The Midosuji Parade is held here, usually in October, featuring participants from Japan and abroad.

== Route description ==
Midōsuji becomes the Shinmido-suji in Kita-ku, Osaka, running concurrently with Japan National Route 423. After travelling about 16 kilometres (9.9 mi) to the north it becomes the Minō Toll Road. To the south, Midōsuji becomes the Kishu Highway.

== History ==
In Edo period, Midosuji was just a narrow street called "Yodoyabashisuji (淀屋橋筋)". Midōsuji was built in the Taishō period, widening an existing north-south street and extending it to run all the way to Umeda in the north and Namba in the south.

Today Midōsuji is an ultra high-class shopping street, housing clothing stores by such brands as Louis Vuitton, Chanel, major hotels, and even an Apple flagship.

The area has been referred to in songs by popular artists such as Hitomi Yaida on her 2006 album It's a New Day.

== Features ==
Point	Coordinates (links to map & photo sources)	Notes
Ōsaka Station	34.7018°N 135.4986°E	Umeda
Keihan National Highway	34.6983°N 135.5005°E	The terminus of Japan National Route 1
Shin-Midōsuji	34.6963°N 135.5013°E	
Nakanoshima	34.6938°N 135.5011°E	Nakanoshima
Chūō Ōdōri	34.6818°N 135.5006°E	
Nagahori-dōri	34.6751°N 135.5004°E	Shinsaibashi
Dōtonbori Canal	34.669°N 135.5003°E	Dōtonbori
Sennichimae-dōri	34.6671°N 135.5003°E	
Namba	34.6647°N 135.4999°E	Namba
