= Kitakinki-Toyooka Expressway =

Expressway in Hyogo Prefecture, Japan

Kitakinki Toyo-oka Expressway
- 北近畿豊岡自動車道

Route information
- Maintained by Ministry of Land, Infrastructure, Transport and Tourism
- Length: 67.5 km (41.9 mi)
- Existed: 1977–present
- Component highways: National Route 483

Major junctions
- South end: Kasuga Interchange; Maizuru-Wakasa Expressway in Tanba
- North end: Hidaka-Kannabekōgen Interchange; National Route 482 in Toyooka

Location
- Country: Japan

Highway system
- National highways of Japan; Expressways of Japan

The Kitakinki-Toyooka Expressway (北近畿豊岡自動車道, Kitakinki-Toyooka Jidōsha-dō), otherwise known as the Kitakinki Road, is an incomplete two-lane national expressway in Hyōgo Prefecture. It is owned and operated primarily by the Ministry of Land, Infrastructure, Transport and Tourism (MLIT), but has a short section maintained and tolled by the Hyōgo Prefecture Road Corporation. The route is signed E72 under MLIT's "2016 Proposal for Realization of Expressway Numbering."

== Junction list ==
The entire expressway is in Hyōgo Prefecture. PA – parking area, TB – toll gate

| Location | km | mi | Exit | Name | Destinations | Notes |
|---|---|---|---|---|---|---|
| Tanba | 0.0 | 0.0 | 3 / TB | Kasuga | National Route 175 / Maizuru-Wakasa Expressway | Southern terminus |
| Tanba | 6.9 | 4.3 | PA | Hikami | Hyōgo Prefecture Route 7 (Aogaki Kaibara Route) | Northbound access only to the parking area; full access to and from Route 7 |
| Tanba | 17.1 | 10.6 | — | Aogaki | Hyōgo Prefecture Route 7 (Aogaki Kaibara Route) | |
| Tanba | 24.4 | 15.2 | — | Tōzaka Ramp | National Route 427 | Northbound entrance, southbound exit |
| Tanba / Asago border | 25.5 28.1 | 15.8 17.5 | Tōsaka Tunnel; marking the border between Tanba and Asago | | | |
| Asago | 28.6 | 17.8 | TB | Tōsaka | | |
| Asago | 30.3 | 18.8 | — | Santō | National Route 427 | |
| Asago | 33.9 | 21.1 | PA | Santō | | Known otherwise as “Michinoeki Tajima no Mahoroba” |
| Asago | 36.4 | 22.6 | 17 | Wadayama | National Route 312 / Bantan Renraku Road south | Northern terminus of Bantan Renraku Road |
| Yabu | 46.1 | 28.6 | — | Yabu | Hyōgo Prefecture Route 70 (Jūni Shosawa Route) | Northbound exit, southbound entrance |
| Yabu | 46.4– 49.4 | 28.8– 30.7 | Yōka Tunnel | | | |
| Yabu | 50.1 | 31.1 | — | Yōka-Hyōnosen | National Route 9 | |
| Toyooka | 59.8 | 37.2 | — | Hidaka Kannabe-Kōgen | National Route 482 | |
| Toyooka | 63.0 | 39.1 | — | Hidaka-kita | Hyōgo Prefecture Route 1 (Hidaka Takeno Route) | Southbound exit, northbound entrance |
| Toyooka | 65.5 | 40.7 | — | Tajima Airport | Hyōgo Prefecture Route 50 (Tajima Airport Route) | Northbound exit, southbound entrance |
| Toyooka | 67.5 | 41.9 | — | Toyooka-Izushi | Hyōgo Prefecture Route 727 (Toyooka Inter Route) | Current northern terminus |
| Toyooka | 73.0 | 45.4 | — | Toyooka-kita | National Route 178 / San'in Kinki Expressway | Planned |
1.000 mi = 1.609 km; 1.000 km = 0.621 mi: Incomplete access; Unopened

== See also ==
- Japan National Route 483
