= Keiji Bypass =

Toll road in Japan

Keiji Bypass
- 京滋バイパス
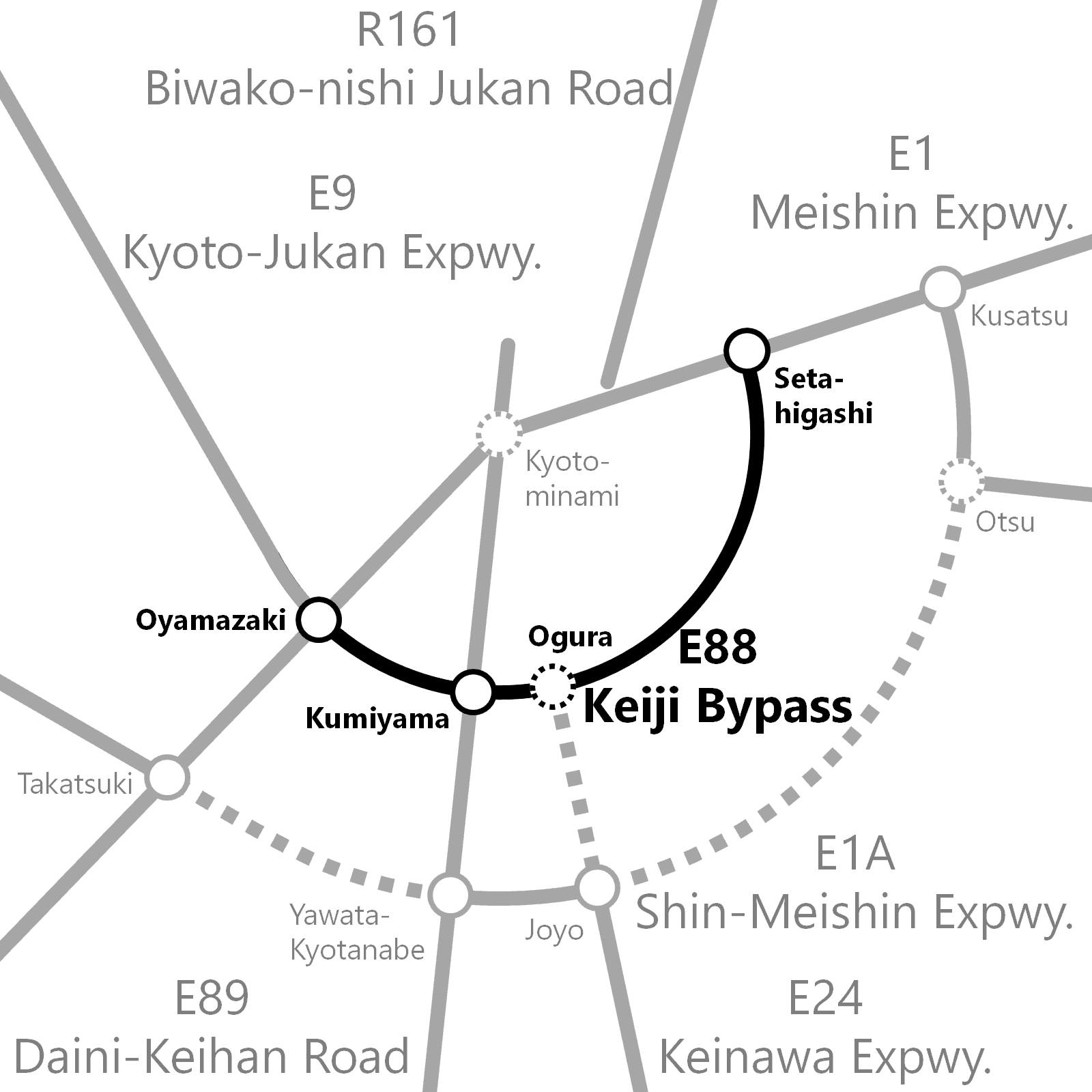
- Map of Keiji Bypass (black) and expressways (gray) around Kyoto City. Roads and junctions under planning are shown by dotted lines.

Route information
- Maintained by West Nippon Expressway Company
- Length: 27.1 km (16.8 mi)
- Existed: 1988–present
- Component highways: National Route 1 National Route 478

Major junctions
- East end: Seta-higashi Junction; AH1 Meishin Expressway in Ōtsu, Shiga
- West end: Ōyamazaki Junction Interchange; AH1 Meishin Expressway; Kyoto Jūkan Expressway in Ōyamazaki, Kyoto

Location
- Country: Japan

Highway system
- National highways of Japan; Expressways of Japan

The Keiji Bypass (京滋バイパス, Keiji Baipasu) is a toll road in Kyoto Prefecture and Shiga Prefecture. The highway serves as an alternative to Japan National Route 1 and the Meishin Expressway by bypassing Kyoto to the south of the city. It is owned and operated by the West Nippon Expressway Company (NEXCO West Japan). The route is signed E88 under the Ministry of Land, Infrastructure, Transport and Tourism's "2016 Proposal for Realization of Expressway Numbering."

== Route description ==
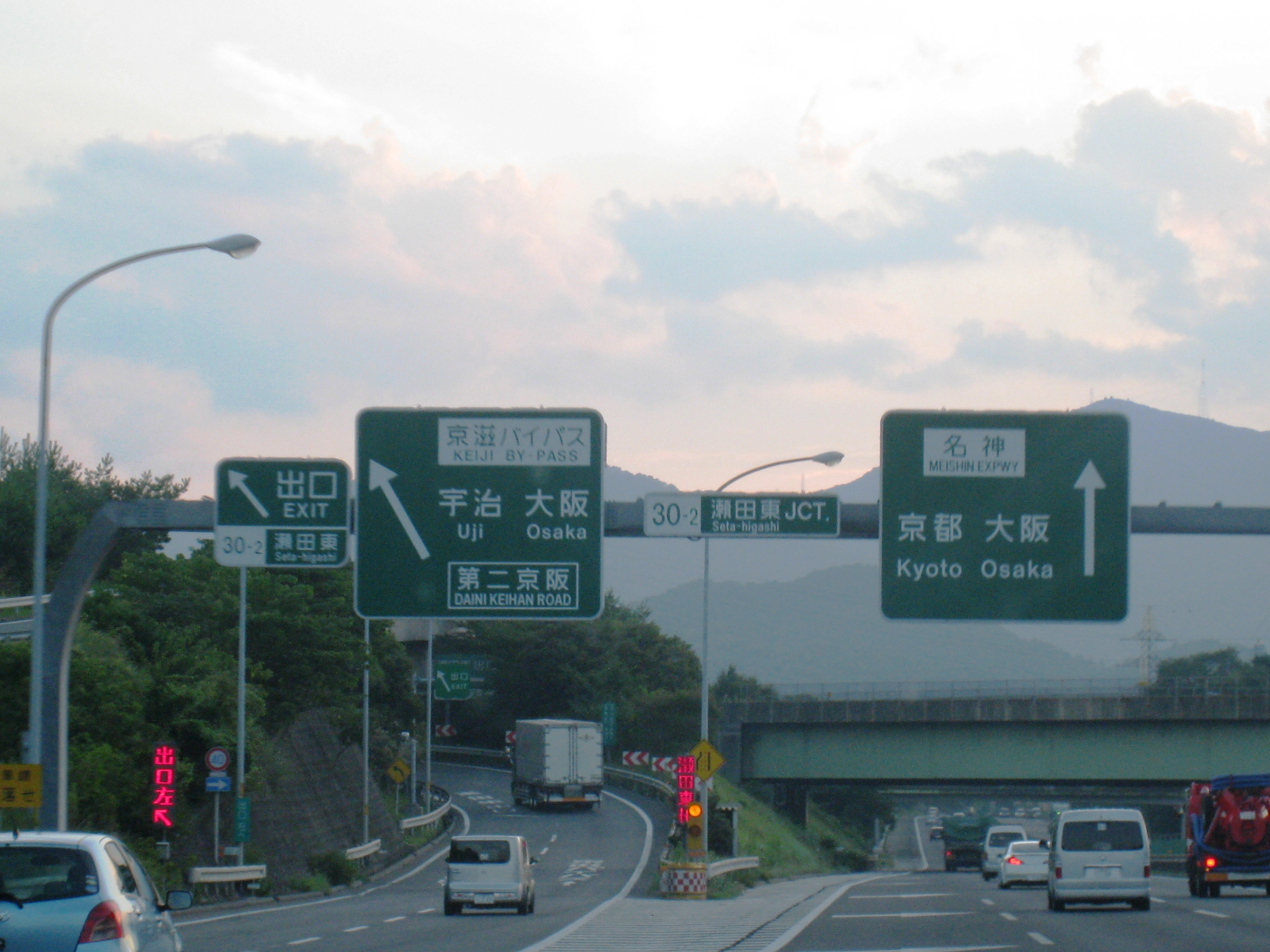
The eastern terminus of the Keiji Bypass at Seta-higashi Junction with the Meishin Expressway.

The Keiji Bypass is a four-lane dual-carriageway that begins at Seta-higashi Junction in the city of Ōtsu in Shiga Prefecture. From here it curves to the southwest to bypass Kyoto. It goes through several tunnels as it crosses in to Kyoto Prefecture. To the south of Kyoto, it is paralleled by National Route 1 and further to the west, National Route 478. Its western terminus is at the Meishin Expressway to the southwest of Kyoto. The roadway of the Keiji Bypass continues on to the northwest as the Kyoto Jūkan Expressway. The entire route has a speed limit of 80 km/h (50 mph).

== Junction list ==
The Keiji Bypass is a direct extension of National Route 1. Therefore, the distance markings continue from the sequence of Route 1, starting at 479.3 kilometres (297.8 mi) at Seta-highashi Interchange. TB= Toll booth

Prefecture	Location	km	mi	Exit	Name	Destinations	Notes
Shiga	Ōtsu	479.3	297.8	30-2	Seta-higashi	AH1 Meishin Expressway– Rittō, Nagoya	Eastbound exit, westbound entrance
Shiga	Ōtsu	479.5	297.9	30-2	Seta-higashi	National Route 1, Shiga Prefecture Route 2	
Shiga	Ōtsu	482.6	299.9	1	Ishiyama	Shiga Prefecture Route 106– Central Ōtsu, Kusastsu, Nangō District	Eastbound exit, westbound entrance
Shiga	Ōtsu	486.9	302.5	2	Nangō	Shiga Prefecture Route 3– Central Ōtsu, Uji, Ujitawara	Eastbound entrance, westbound exit
Kyoto	Uji	489.2	304.0	3	Kasatori		Eastbound exit, westbound entrance
Kyoto	Uji	493.9	306.9	4	Uji-higashi	Kyoto Prefecture Route 7– Kyoto, Uji, Amagase Dam	Eastbound entrance, westbound exit
Kyoto	Uji	497.0	308.8	5	Uji-nishi	National Route 24, Kyoto Prefecture Route 69– Jōyō, Kyoto	
Kyoto	Uji	498.0	309.4	6	Ogura	National Route 1, National Route 24– Nara, National Route 478, Ōyamazaki	Eastbound entrance, westbound exit
Kyoto	Kumiyama	500.0	310.7	2	Kumiyama	Daini Keihan Road– Kyoto, Kadoma, Osaka, Hirakata, Osaka	
Kyoto	Kumiyama	501.0	311.3	7	Kumiyama	National Route 1, National Route 478– Nara, National Route 24, Uji	Eastbound exit, westbound entrance
Kyoto	Kumiyama	503.0	312.5	8	Kumiyama-Yodo	National Route 478, Kyoto Prefecture Route 15, Kyoto Prefecture Route 81– Joyo, Fushimi	
Kyoto	Ōyamazaki	505.8	314.3	33-3	Ōyamazaki	National Route 171– Kyoto, Takatsuki, Osaka	
Kyoto	Ōyamazaki	506.4	314.7	33-3	Ōyamazaki	AH1 Meishin Expressway– Suita, Osaka, Nagoya	
Through to Kyoto Jūkan Expressway
1.000 mi = 1.609 km; 1.000 km = 0.621 mi: Incomplete access

== See also ==
- Japan National Route 1
- Japan National Route 478
