= 9B =

9B, 9b or IX-B may refer to:

- Route 9B (WMATA), a bus route operated by the Washington Metropolitan Area Transit Authority
- Stalag IX-B, a World War II German Army prisoner of war camp at Wegscheide close to Bad Orb
- 9B (TV series), a 1988 TV series with Canadian actor Zachary Ansley
- Boron-9 (^{9}B), an isotope of boron
- HAT-P-9b, an extrasolar planet

== See also ==
- List of highways numbered 9B
- B9 (disambiguation)
