= Bantan Renraku Road =

Road in Hyogo prefecture, Japan

Bantan Renraku Road
- 国道Bantan-Renraku号
- 播但連絡道路

Route information
- Maintained by Hyōgo Prefecture Road Corporation
- Length: 63.7 km (39.6 mi)
- Existed: 1973–present
- Component highways: National Route 312

Major junctions
- South end: Himeji Junction; National Route 2 in Himeji, Hyōgo
- North end: Wadayama Junction; Kitakinki-Toyooka Expressway in Asago, Hyōgo

Location
- Country: Japan

Highway system
- National highways of Japan; Expressways of Japan

The Bantan Renraku Road (播但連絡道路, Bantan Renraku Dōro) is a toll road in Hyōgo Prefecture, Japan. It is signed E95 under the "2016 Proposal for Realization of Expressway Numbering."

== Junction list ==
- IC - interchange, SIC - smart interchange, JCT - junction, SA - service area, PA - parking area, BS - bus stop, TB - toll gate

No.	Name	Connections	Dist. from Origin	Bus Stop	Notes	Location (all in Hyōgo)
	Himeji JCT	National Route 2 (Himeji Bypass)	0.0			Himeji
1	Ōshio Bessho Ramp	Pref. Route 399 (Ōshio Bessho Route)	0.7		Access only to Wadayama-bound traffic.	Himeji
2	Hanada IC/TB	Pref. Route 397 (Hanada Gochaku Teishajō Route)	4.8			Himeji
3	San'yō Himeji-Higashi IC	San'yō Expressway	7.1		Access only to and from San'yō Expressway.	Himeji
-	Toyotomi PA	-	7.4; 7.9		for Wadayama for Himeji	Himeji
4	Toyotomi Ramp	Pref. Route 218 (Nishitawara Himeji Route)	9.1		Access only to Himeji-bound traffic.	Himeji
5	Tohori Ramp	National Route 312	9.8		Access only to Wadayama-bound traffic.	Himeji
6	Funatsu Ramp	Pref. Route 81 (Ono Kōdera Route)	13.9			Himeji
7	Fukusaki-Minami TB		16.3		Tollbooth is located on Himeji-bound side	Fukusaki
7	Fukusaki-Minami Ramp		17.3		Access is available to Hyōgo Prefecture Route 218 via Fukusaki Town Road.	Fukusaki
9	Fukusaki IC	Chūgoku Expressway	17.7	○		Fukusaki
8	Fukusaki-Kita TB		18.9		Tollbooth is located on Himeji-bound side	Fukusaki
8	Fukusaki-Kita Ramp	Pref. Route 23 (Miki Shisō Route)	19.1			Fukusaki
9	Ichikawa-Minami Ramp		22.2		Access is available to National Route 312 and Hyōgo Prefecture Route 34 via Ichikawa Town Road.	Ichikawa
PA	Ichikawa SA		27.5			Ichikawa
10	Ichikawa-Kita Ramp	National Route 312	28.0		Access only to Himeji-bound traffic.	Ichikawa
11	Kanzaki-Minami Ramp	Pref. Route 8 (Kami Shisō Route)	31.4			Kamikawa
12	Kanzaki-Kita Ramp	National Route 312	38.4		Access only to Himeji-bound traffic.	Kamikawa
13	Ikuno Ramp	Pref. Route 39 (Ichinomiya Ikuno Route)	43.7		Access only from Himeji-bound traffic.	Asago
14	Ikuno-Kita Daiichi Ramp	National Route 312	46.2		Access only to Wadayama-bound traffic.	Asago
15	Ikuno-Kita Daini Ramp	National Route 312	46.4		Access only from Himeji-bound traffic.	Asago
	Michinoeki Fresh Asago		49.7			Asago
16	Asago IC	National Route 429; Pref. Route 70 (Jūni Shosawa Route)	51.7			Asago
TB	Wadayama TB		59.3			Asago
PA	Wadayama PA		60.3		southbound only northbound was abandoned on May 9, 2005	Asago
17	Wadayama IC	National Route 312	63.6	○		Asago
JCT	Wadayama JCT	Kitakinki-Toyooka Expressway	63.7			Asago

== See also ==
- Japan National Route 312
