= Ōyamazaki =

Ōyamazaki 大山崎町
- Town
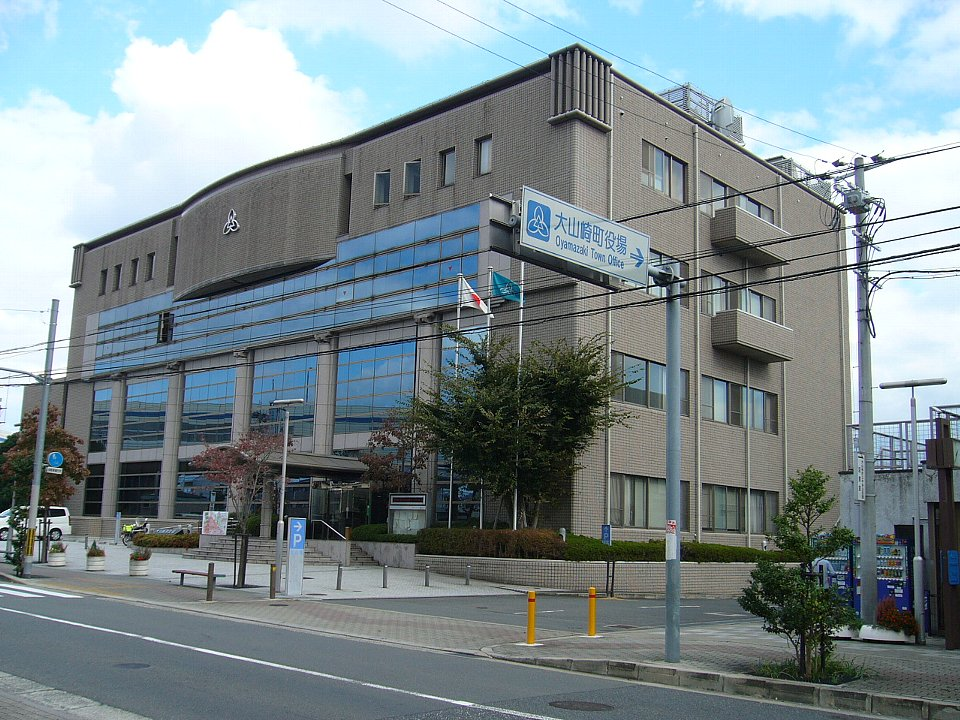
- Ōyamazaki Town Hall

- Flag Emblem
- Location of Ōyamazaki in Kyoto Prefecture

- Location in Japan
- Coordinates: 34°54′10″N 135°41′18″E
- Country: Japan
- Region: Kansai
- Prefecture: Kyoto
- District: Otokuni

Government
  - Mayor: Hikaru Maekawa

Area
  - Total: 5.97 km^{2} (2.31 sq mi)

Population (September 1, 2023)
  - Total: 16,219
  - Density: 2,720/km^{2} (7,040/sq mi)
- Time zone: UTC+09:00 (JST)
- City hall address: 3 Natsume, Enmyoji Koza, Oyamazaki-cho, Otokuni-gun, Kyoto-fu 618-8501
- Website: Official website
- Symbols
- Bird: Japanese bush warbler
- Flower: Cherry blossom
- Tree: Pinus densiflora

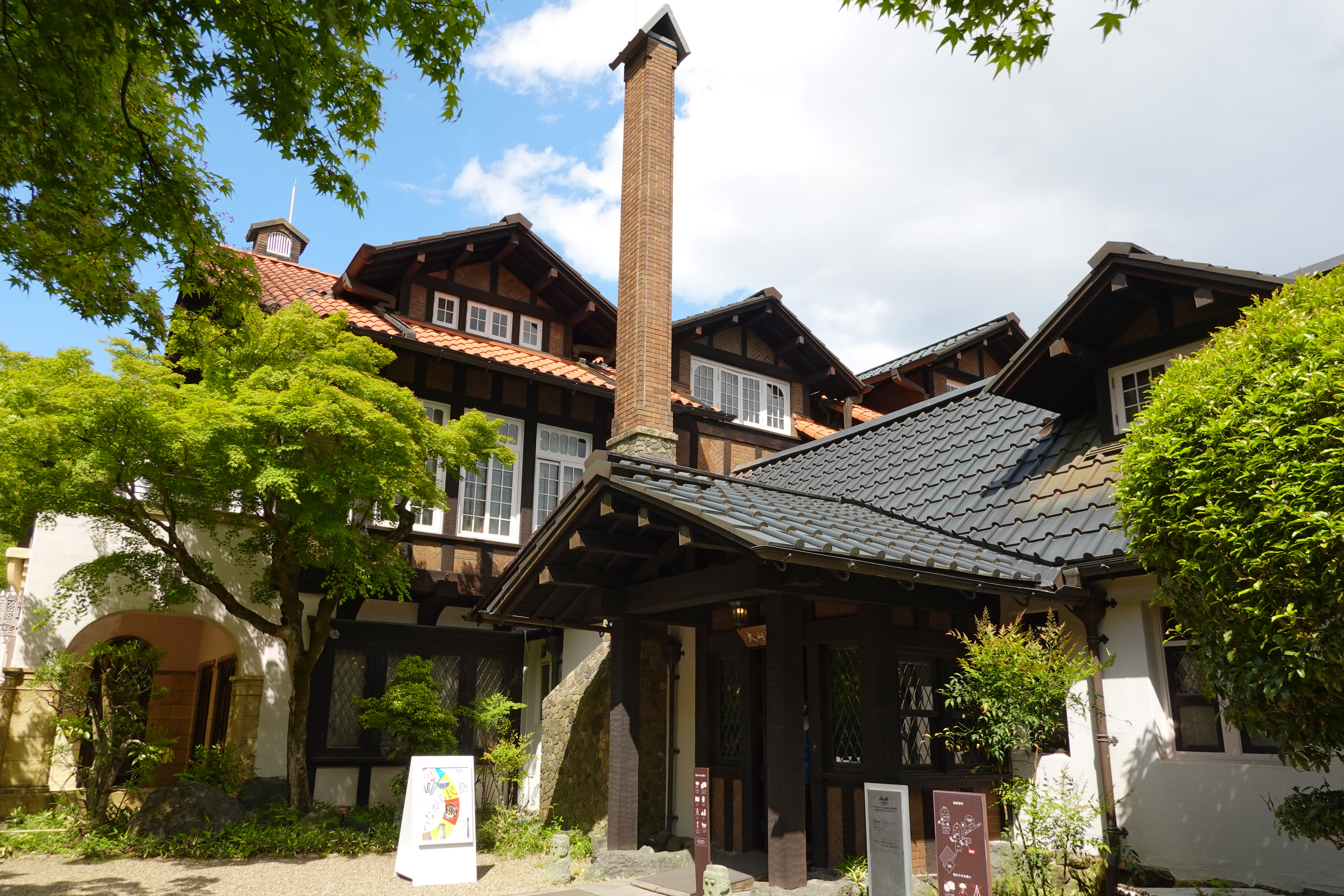
Asahi Beer Oyamazaki Villa Museum of Art

Hoshaku-ji

Ōyamazaki (大山崎町, Ōyamazaki-chō) is a town located in Otokuni District, Kyoto Prefecture, Japan. As of 1 September 2023, the town has an estimated population of 16,219 in 6722 households and a population density of 2700 persons per km^{2}. The total area of the town is 5.97 square kilometres (2.31 sq mi).

== Geography ==
Ōyamazaki is located in southeastern Kyoto Prefecture. Yamazaki has been an important transportation hub since ancient times, as the hills approach the plains and the confluence of the Katsura, Uji, and Kizugawa rivers is located at the foot of Mount Tennōzan, which at 270 meters, is the highest elevation in the town.The Battle of Yamazaki, where Toyotomi Hideyoshi defeated Akechi Mitsuhide, took place at the foot of Tennōzan. The Yamazaki area is also known for its famous spring water.

=== Neighboring municipalities ===
Kyoto Prefecture

- Kyoto
- Nagaokakyō
- Yawata

Osaka Prefecture

- Mishima District (Shimamoto)

=== Climate ===
Ōyamazaki has a humid subtropical climate (Köppen Cfa) characterized by warm summers and cool winters with light to no snowfall. The average annual temperature in Ōyamazaki is 14.5 °C (58.1 °F). The average annual rainfall is 1,677 millimetres (66.0 in) with September as the wettest month. The temperatures are highest on average in August, at around 26.5 °C (79.7 °F), and lowest in January, at around 3.1 °C (37.6 °F).

== Demographics ==
Per Japanese census data, the population of Ōyamazaki has remained relatively steady in recent decades.

Historical population
Year	Pop.	±%
1940	2,674	—
1950	3,010	+12.6%
1960	3,346	+11.2%
1970	10,375	+210.1%
1980	16,283	+56.9%
1990	16,152	−0.8%
2000	15,736	−2.6%
2010	15,123	−3.9%
2020	15,953	+5.5%

== History ==
The area of Ōyamazaki was part of ancient Yamashiro Province. During the early Heian period, Emperor Saga had a villa in Yamazaki. The site is now the Rikyu Hachiman-gu, which served for a time as the provincial capital of Yamashiro Province. During the Kamakura period, the area was famous for its production of edible oils, and as a security checkpoint on the southern approaches to Kyoto. The village of Ōyamazaki was established on April 1, 1889, with the creation of the modern municipalities system and was raised to town status in 1967.

== Government ==
Ōyamazaki has a mayor-council form of government with a directly elected mayor and a unicameral town council of 12 members. Ōyamazaki, collectively with the city of Nagaokakyō, contributes two members to the Kyoto Prefectural Assembly. In terms of national politics, the town is part of the Kyoto 6th district of the lower house of the Diet of Japan.

== Economy ==
The headquarters of Maxell and the Daihatsu Kyoto plant are located in Ōyamazaki.

== Education ==
Ōyamazaki has two public elementary schools and one public junior high school operated by town government. The town does not have a high school

== Transportation ==
=== Railways ===
JR West - Tōkaidō Main Line (JR Kyōto Line)

- Yamazaki

Hankyu - Kyoto Main Line

- Ōyamazaki

=== Highways ===
- Meishin Expressway
- Keiji Bypass
- Kyoto Jūkan Expressway
- National Route 171
- National Route 478

== Local attractions ==
- Asahi Beer Oyamazaki Villa Museum of Art
- Hoshaku-ji
