= Japan National Route 423 =

Road in Japan

National Route 423
- 国道423号
- 新御堂筋 (Shinmidō-suji)
- National Route 423 highlighted in red

Route information
- Length: 50.6 km (31.4 mi)
- Existed: 1982–present

Major junctions
- South end: National Route 25 in Kita-ku, Osaka
- National Route 1; National Route 479; National Route 171; Shin-Meishin Expressway; National Route 372 / Kyoto Jūkan Expressway
- North end: National Route 9 in Kameoka, Kyoto

Location
- Country: Japan

Highway system
- National highways of Japan; Expressways of Japan
← National Route 422	→ National Route 424

National Route 423 (国道423号, Kokudō Yonhyaku ni-jusangō) is a national highway of Japan connecting Kita-ku, Osaka and Kameoka, Kyoto in the Kansai region of Japan.

== Route description ==
National Route 423 has a total length of 50.6 kilometers (31.4 mi).

=== Minō Toll Road ===
The Minō Toll Road is a 7.2-kilometer-long (4.5 mi) two-lane toll road in Minoh, Osaka that connects the Shin-Meishin Expressway to the southern limits of the city via a tunnel under Mount Minō. It is a part of Route 423 that is tolled and maintained by the Osaka Prefectural Road Corporation.

=== Shinmidō-suji ===
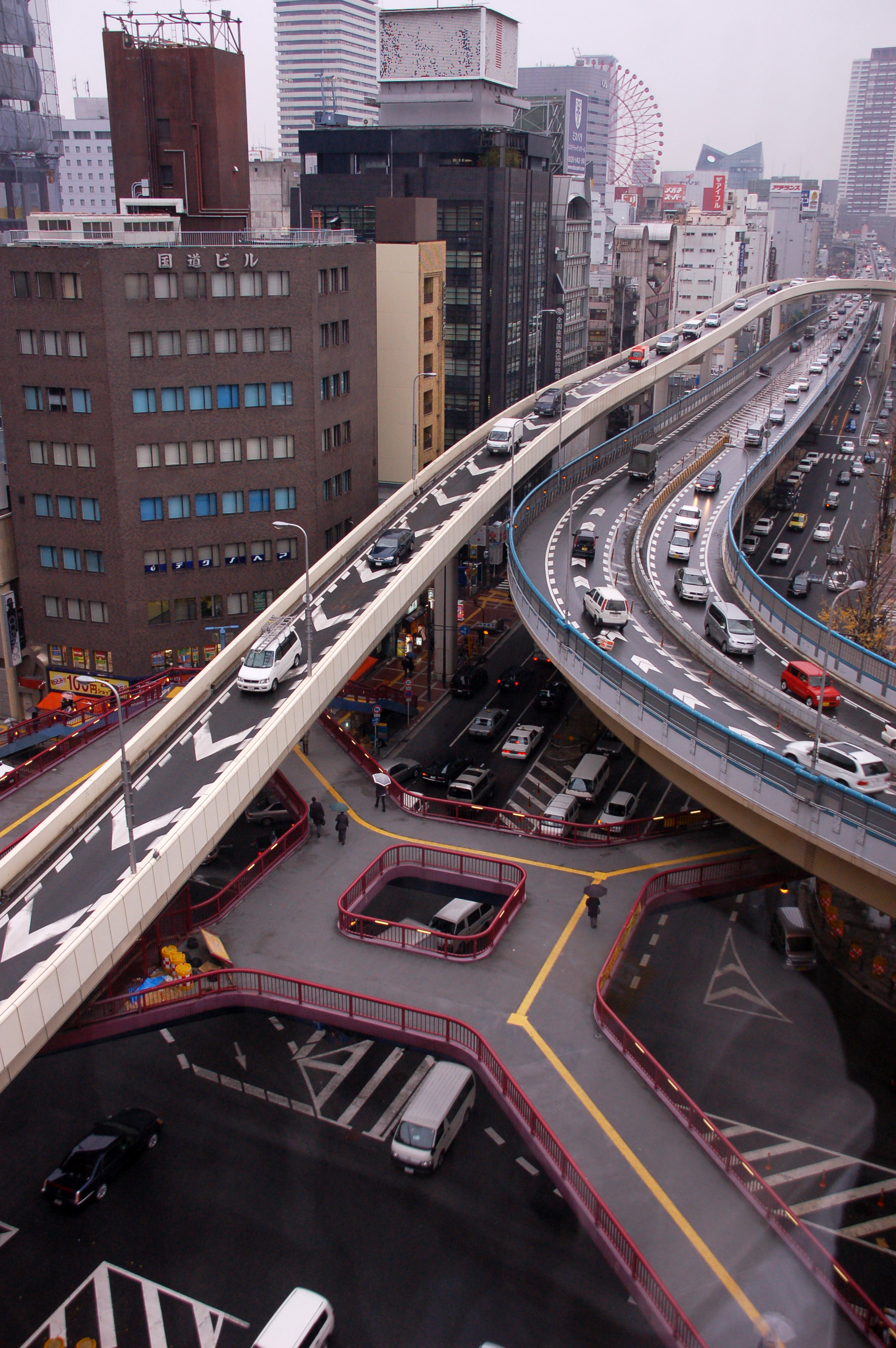
The Shinmidō-suji at its junction with Japan National Route 1 in Kita-ku.

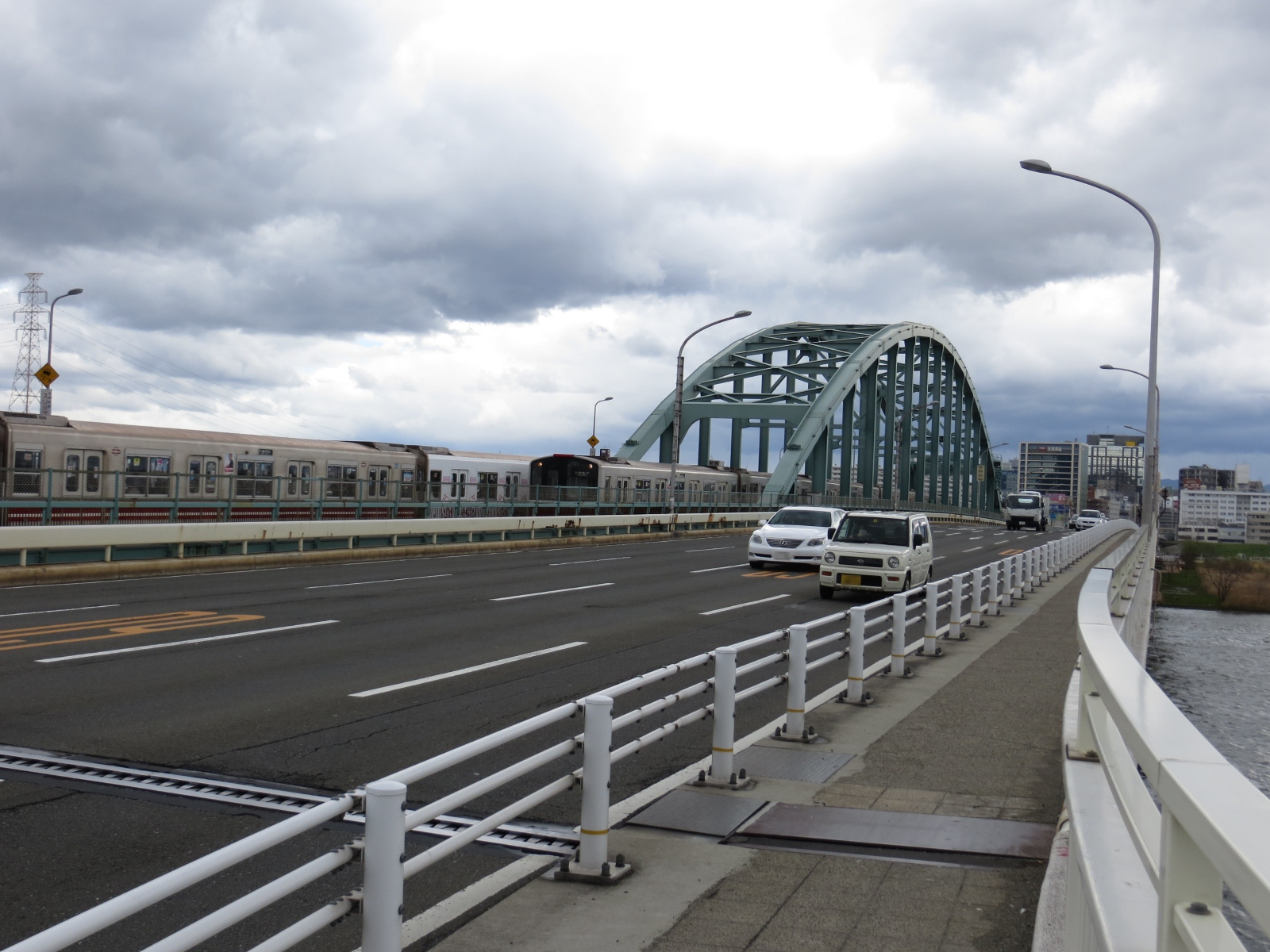
The Shin-Yodogawa Great Bridge carries Route 423 and the Midōsuji Line over the Yodo River.

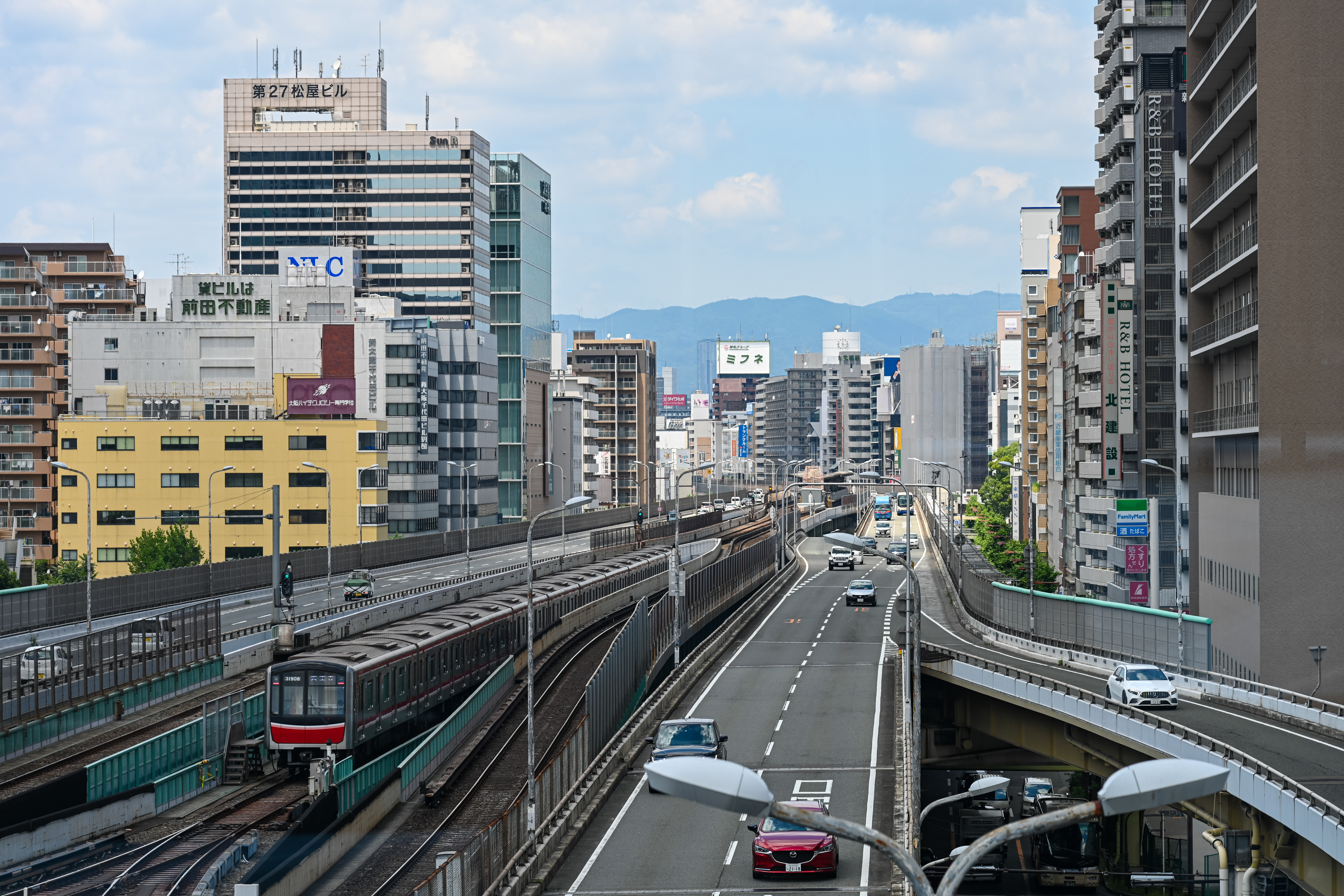
Osaka Metro Midōsuji Line train running between either direction of Shin-Midōsuji

The Shinmidō-suji is a 7.2-kilometer-long (4.5 mi) controlled-access highway that runs from the northern terminus of the Midōsuji in Kita-ku to the southern terminus of the Minō Toll Road in Minoh. From Kita-ku to Toyonaka, the median of the highway is utilized by the Midōsuji Line and Kita-Osaka Kyuko Railway.

== History ==
Much of what is now National Route 423 was part of the Settan-kaido, a road linking Ikeda in what was Settsu Province and Kameoka in what was then Tanba Province.

In 1964, the portion of the route between Kita-ku and Osaka Prefecture Route 9, known as the Shinmidō-suji, was built alongside the extended Midōsuji Line to accommodate automobile traffic from Shin-Ōsaka Station into central Osaka. Later in the decade, Shinmidō-suji was extended north again along with the Midōsuji Line to Suita were the venue for the Expo '70 was. National Route 423 was established in 1982 along the Shinmidō-suji, the planned Minō Toll Road, and the older Settan-kaido.

The Minō Toll Road section was opened to traffic on 30 May 2007 between Osaka Route 9 and the northern terminus at the Ikeda–Minoh route of National Route 423, completing the route. On 10 December 2017 the highway was connected to the Shin-Meishin Expressway at the northern terminus of the Ikeda–Minoh route and the toll road.

== List of major junctions ==
Prefecture	Location	km	mi	Exit	Name	Destinations	Notes
Osaka	Kita-ku, Osaka	0.0	0.0	—	Umeshin-minami	National Route 25 south (Midōsuji)	Southern terminus; traffic can only travel southbound on Midōsuji
Osaka	Kita-ku, Osaka	0.2	0.12	—	Umeshin-higashi	National Route 1 (Sonezaki-dori)	Partial interchange; southern end of controlled-access highway segment
Osaka	Yodo River	2.31 3.06	1.44 1.90	Shin-Yodogawa Great Bridge			
Osaka	Yodogawa-ku, Osaka	3.4	2.1	—	Nishinakajima	Osaka Prefecture Route 16 (Yodogawa Route)	Northbound exit, southbound entrance
Osaka	Yodogawa-ku, Osaka	4.2	2.6	—	Shin-Ōsaka	Shin-Osaka Station access road	
Osaka	Suita	7.0	4.3	—	Esaka	National Route 479	
Osaka	Suita	11.0	6.8	—	Momoyamadai	Osaka Prefecture Route 35 (Toyonaka-Settsu Route)	
Osaka	Toyonaka	12.6	7.8	—	Senri	Osaka Prefecture Route 2– to Chūgoku Expressway	
Osaka	Minoh	15.3	9.5	—	Minō	National Route 171 – Kyoto, Kobe	Northern end of controlled-access highway segment
Osaka	Minoh	16.2	10.1	—	Hakushima	Osaka Prefecture Route 9	Southern terminus of the Minō Toll Road; northern terminus of Shinmidō-suji; southbound entrance, northbound exit
Osaka	Minoh	23.4	14.5	13	Minō-Todoromi	National Route 423 south (Ikeda-Minoh route) / Shin-Meishin Expressway – Kyoto, Tsuyama, Okayama, Ikeda, Toyono	Northern terminus of the Minō Toll Road
Osaka	Toyono	21.0	13.0	—	Kanaishibashi	Osaka Prefecture Route 4	
Osaka	Toyono	22.7	14.1	—	Kishiroguchi	Osaka Prefecture Route 110 south	
Osaka	Toyono	23.2	14.4	—	Kishiroguchi	Osaka Prefecture Route 109 east	
Osaka	Toyono	24.4	15.2	—	Myokenguchi	Osaka Prefecture Route 605 west	
Kyoto	Kameoka	27.9	17.3	—	Yunohara	Kyoto Prefecture Route 733 east	
Kyoto	Kameoka	30.5	19.0	—	Waroji	Kyoto Prefecture Route 732 west	
Kyoto	Kameoka	36.3	22.6	—	Sogabe	Kyoto Prefecture Route 407	
Kyoto	Kameoka	38.0	23.6	13	Kameoka	National Route 372 west / Kyoto Jūkan Expressway	Southern end of Route 372 concurrency; interchange
Kyoto	Kameoka	38.1	23.7	—	Kazanokuchi	Kyoto Prefecture Route 406 west	
Kyoto	Kameoka	39.1	24.3	—	Kazuka	National Route 9 (San'indō) / Kyoto Prefecture Route 403 east	Northern terminus; northern end of Route 372 concurrency
1.000 mi = 1.609 km; 1.000 km = 0.621 mi: Concurrency terminus; Incomplete access

=== Ikeda–Minoh route ===
The entire toll road is in Osaka Prefecture.

Location	km	mi	Exit	Name	Destinations	Notes
Ikeda	0.0	0.0	—	Kibechō	National Route 173	Southern terminus
Ikeda	0.3	0.19	11-14	Ikeda-Kibe Daiichi	Hanshin Expressway Ikeda Route	Northbound entrance, southbound exit
Minoh	6.2	3.9	13	Minō-Todoromi	National Route 423 / Shin-Meishin Expressway – Kyoto, Tsuyama, Okayama, Ikeda, Toyono	Northern terminus of the Ikeda-Minoh route
Through to National Route 423 (main route)
1.000 mi = 1.609 km; 1.000 km = 0.621 mi: Incomplete access

== See also ==
- Minō Toll Road
