= B90 =

B90 may refer to:

== Places ==
- WOH S264, a red supergiant star in the Large Magellanic Cloud, also known by the catalog number B90 in the W60 catalog
- A postcode area in Solihull, West Midlands, England, UK

=== Roads ===
- Bundesstraße 90, a road in Germany; see List of federal highways in Germany
- Nassfeld Straße (Landesstraße 90; formerly Bundesstraße 90), a road in Austria
- B90, a road in Greenisland, County Antrim, Northern Ireland

== Vehicular ==
- DLR B90 stock, a passenger train on the Docklands Light Railway in London, UK
- Russian submarine Sarov (B-90)

=== Automotive ===
- Bestune B90, a mid-size car
- Dacia Sandero (B90), the first generation of the Dacia Sandero hatchback

=== Aviation ===
- Aeromarine B-90, an early U.S. aircraft engine
- Blackburn B-90, a British swing wing aeroplane from Blackburn Aircraft
- Russian Air Force B-90 (Bombardirovshik 90), a Russian air force bomber project

== Other uses ==
- B90 nuclear bomb
- Sicilian Defence, Najdorf Variation, Encyclopaedia of Chess Openings code
- B90 FM (1990–1993), a radio station in Wellington, New Zealand
- Bündnis 90 (Alliance 90), a German political coalition

== See also ==
- B (disambiguation)
- B9 (disambiguation)
- 90 (disambiguation)
