= 9E =

9E or 9-E can refer to:

- 9th meridian east
- IATA code for Endeavor Air
- List of highways numbered 9E
- Route 9E (WMATA); see List of Metrobus routes (Washington, D.C.)
- AIM-9E, a model of AIM-9 Sidewinder
- 9e, French for 9th
  - Paris 9e (9e arrondissement), or 9th arrondissement of Paris
  - 9e RIMA, or 9th Marine Infantry Regiment
  - 9e Régiment de Chasseurs Parachutistes, or 9th Parachute Chasseur Regiment
- HP 9E, Windows codepage 1250 in Hewlett-Packard printers

== See also ==
- E9 (disambiguation)
