= Japan National Route 483 =

Road in Hyōgo prefecture, Japan

National Route 483
- 国道483号

Route information
- Length: 11.6 km (7.2 mi)

Location
- Country: Japan

Highway system
- National highways of Japan; Expressways of Japan
← National Route 482	→ National Route 484

National Route 483 is a national highway of Japan connecting between Toyooka, Hyōgo and Tamba, Hyōgo in Japan, with a total length of 11.6 kilometers (7.2 mi).

A major part of the road is known as the Kitakinki-Toyooka Expressway (北近畿豊岡自動車道, Kitakinki Toyooka Jidōshadō), a toll road connecting Tamba, Hyōgo and Toyooka, Hyōgo managed by West Nippon Expressway Company.
