= List of A9 roads =

This is a list of roads designated A9.

- A009 road (Argentina), a road in the northeast of Santa Fe Province
- A9 highway (Australia) may refer to:
  - A9 (Sydney), a road linking Windsor and Campbelltown
  - Port River Expressway, a limited-access road connecting Port Adelaide and major interstate routes to Perth and Sydney
  - Arthur Highway, a road connecting Sorell and Port Arthur
- A9 motorway (Austria), a road connecting the A1 and A8 junction and the A1 border with Slovenia
- A9 motorway (Bosnia and Herzegovina) a road connecting the A1 with the M16 and the E661 route
- A9 road (China) may refer to:
  - A9 expressway (Shanghai), a controlled-access highway connecting A20 Huqingping Interchange and Jiangsu Province Boundary
- A9 (Croatia), a road connecting Pula, Croatia with the A8 motorway and the border with Slovenia
- A9 motorway (Cyprus), a road connecting Nicosia with the Troodos Mountains
- A9 autoroute (France), a road connecting Orange and Perthus
- Bundesautobahn 9 (Germany), a road connecting Berlin and Munich
- Autostrada A9 (Italy), a road connecting the A8 motorway at Lainate, near Milan with Como and Chiasso at the border with Switzerland
- A9 road (Latvia), a road connecting Riga and Liepāja
- A9 highway (Lithuania), a road connecting Panevėžys and Sitkūnai
- A9 motorway (Netherlands), a motorway in the Netherlands from Diemen to Alkmaar
- A9 highway (Nigeria), a road connecting Kano and Katsina to the Niger border
- Autopista AP-9, a road connecting the Portugal border and a junction with the Autovía A-52
- A9 highway (Sri Lanka), a road connecting Kandy and Jaffna
- A9 motorway (Switzerland), a motorway in southwest Switzerland
- A9 road (British Isles) may refer to:
  - A9 road (Isle of Man), a road connecting Ramsey and Andreas
  - A9 road (Scotland), a road connecting Edinburgh to Thurso
- A9 road (United States of America) may refer to:
  - County Route A9 (California), a road in Tehama County
- A9 Road (Zimbabwe)

== See also ==
- List of highways numbered 9
