= San'in Expressway =

Expressway in Japan

San-in Expressway
- 山陰自動車道

Route information
- Length: 380 km (240 mi)
- Existed: 1985–present

Major junctions
- From: Tottori JCT(Tottori 鳥取, Tottori)
- To: Mine (Mine 美祢, Yamaguchi)

Location
- Country: Japan
- Major cities: Yonago, Matsue, Hamada

Highway system
- National highways of Japan; Expressways of Japan

San'in Expressway (山陰自動車道 San'in Jidōsha-dō) is a proposed expressway extending from Tottori, Tottori prefecture to Mine, Yamaguchi prefecture, of Japan. It will follow a path along the northern (San'in) coast of Chūgoku region, passing through Tottori, Shimane, and Yamaguchi prefectures. It is numbered "E9" along with the Kyoto Jukan Expressway and the San'in Kinki Expressway.

Currently, the following segments are designated as part of the National Expressway route:

- Tottori-Masuda Route (鳥取益田線): Tottori -- Masuda, Shimane
- Misumi Mine Route (三隅美祢線): Nagato, Yamaguchi -- Mine

== List of interchanges and features ==
- IC - interchange, SIC - smart interchange, JCT - junction, SA - service area, PA - parking area, BS - bus stop, TN - tunnel, TB - toll gate, BR - bridge
- Bus stops labeled "○" are currently in use; those marked "◆" are closed.

=== Between Tottori Junction and Suko Interchange ===
Number	Name	Connections	Distance from Origin (km)	Bus Stop	Notes	Location	
Through to Tottori Expressway
(9)	Tottori JCT	San'in Kinki Expressway (planned); National Route 29 (Bypass)	0.0			Tottori	Tottori
1	Tottori-Nishi IC	Tottori Prefectural Route 49	1.8			Tottori	Tottori
2	Yoshioka Onsen IC	Tottori Prefectural Route 191	7.0			Tottori	Tottori
3	Mizuho-Hōgi IC	Tottori Prefectural Route 233	12.9			Tottori	Tottori
4	Hamamura-Shikano Onsen IC/PA	Tottori Prefectural Route 32	14.6			Tottori	Tottori
5	Aoya IC	National Route 9 (Aoya Hawai Road); Tottori Prefectural Route 280	19.3			Tottori	Tottori
6	Tomari-Tōgō IC	National Route 9 Tottori Prefectural Route 22	26.5			Yurihama	Tottori
SA	Hawai SA		30.5			Yurihama	Tottori
7	Hawai IC	National Route 9	33.1			Yurihama	Tottori
–	Hōjō IC/JCT	Hōjō Yubara Road (planning)			opening in 2026	Hokuei	Tottori
–	Daiei IC				opening in 2026	Hokuei	Tottori
9	Daiei-Tōhaku IC	National Route 9 Tottori Prefectural Route 320	46.0			Kotoura	Tottori
10	Kotoura-Higashi IC	Tottori Prefectural Route 44	48.6			Kotoura	Tottori
	Kotoura IC/PA		52.7		IC:opening in 2017	Kotoura	Tottori
11	Kotoura-Senjōsan IC	Tottori Prefectural Route 30	55.4		westbound exit, eastbound entrance	Kotoura	Tottori
11	Kotoura-Senjōsan IC	Tottori Prefectural Route 30	55.7		eastbound exit, westbound entrance	Kotoura	Tottori
12	Akasaki-Nakayama IC	Tottori Prefectural Route 228; Tottori Prefectural Route 278	58.0			Daisen	Tottori
12-1	Nakayama IC	Tottori Prefectural Route 278			eastbound exit, westbound entrance	Daisen	Tottori
-	(Shimoichi Junction)	-	62.3		Boundary between Nakayama Nawa Road and Nawa Yodoe Road	Daisen	Tottori
13	Nawa IC	Tottori Prefectural Route 240	66.6			Daisen	Tottori
14	Daisen IC	Tottori Prefectural Route 158	71.3			Daisen	Tottori
15	Yodoe IC	Tottori Prefectural Route 279	74.4			Daisen	Tottori
16	Yonago-Higashi IC	Tottori Prefectural Route 53	79.3		westbound exit, eastbound entrance	Yonago	Tottori
16	Yonago JCT; Yonago-Higashi Interchange	National Route 431; Yonago Expressway	80.3		eastbound exit, westbound entrance	Yonago	Tottori
17	Hinogawa-Higashi IC	Tottori Prefectural Route 159; Tottori Prefectural Route 160	81.9		westbound exit, eastbound entrance	Yonago	Tottori
17	Hinogawa-Higashi IC	Tottori Prefectural Route 159; Tottori Prefectural Route 160	82.2		eastbound exit, westbound entrance	Yonago	Tottori
18	Yonago-Minami IC	National Route 181	84.8			Yonago	Tottori
19-1	Yonago IC	Tottori Prefectural Route 300	87.4		westbound exit, eastbound entrance	Yonago	Tottori
19-2	Yonago-Nishi IC	National Route 9 (Yonago Road); National Route 180	88.0		westbound exit, eastbound entrance	Yonago	Tottori
19	Yonago-Nishi IC	National Route 9 (Yonago Road); National Route 180	88.0		eastbound exit, westbound entrance	Yonago	Tottori
20	Yasugi IC/TB	Shimane Prefectural Route 334	94.6			Yasugi	Shimane
21	Higashi-Izumo IC	National Route 9 (Matsue Road)	107.1			Matsue	Shimane
22	Chikuya IC	Shimane Prefectural Route 247	109.0		westbound exit, eastbound entrance	Matsue	Shimane
22	Chikuya IC	Shimane Prefectural Route 247	110.0		eastbound exit, westbound entrance	Matsue	Shimane
23	Yada IC		110.6			Matsue	Shimane
23-1	Matsue JCT	National Route 485 (Matsue Dandan Road)	111.4			Matsue	Shimane
24	Matsue-Higashi IC		112.3			Matsue	Shimane
25	Matsue-Chūō IC	Shimane Prefectural Route 21; Shimane Prefectural Route 246	113.8		westbound exit, eastbound entrance	Matsue	Shimane
25	Matsue-Chūō IC	Shimane Prefectural Route 21; Shimane Prefectural Route 246	114.8		eastbound exit, westbound entrance	Matsue	Shimane
26	Matsue-Nishi IC	Shimane Prefectural Route 24	116.0			Matsue	Shimane
27	Matsue-Tamatsukuri IC	National Route 9 (Matsue Road, Tamayu Bypass)	116.0			Matsue	Shimane
TB	Matsue-Tamatsukuri TB		118.1			Matsue	Shimane
SA	Shinjiko SA		119.3	○		Matsue	Shimane
BS	Shinji BS		129.5	○		Matsue	Shimane
28	Shinji IC	Shimane Prefectural Route 57	130.8			Matsue	Shimane
29	Shinji JCT	Matsue Expressway	132.4			Matsue	Shimane
30	Hikawa IC	Shimane Prefectural Route 183	137.0	○		Izumo	Shimane
TB	Hikawa TB	-				Izumo	Shimane
31	Izumo IC	Shimane Prefectural Route 337	150.6			Izumo	Shimane
–	Koryō IC	Shimane Prefectural Route 39	155.0		opening in 2024	Izumo	Shimane
33	Izumo-Tagi IC	Shimane Prefectural Route 340	159.5			Izumo	Shimane
34	Ōda-Asayama IC	Shimane Prefectural Route 286	168.5			Ōda	Shimane
35	Ōda-Chūō Sanbesan IC		174.8			Ōda	Shimane
36	Shizuma IC		179.8			Ōda	Shimane
37	Nima-Iwami Ginzan IC	Shimane Prefectural Route 31	187.7			Ōda	Shimane
38	Yusato IC	National Route 9	193.6			Ōda	Shimane
39	Yunotsu IC	National Route 9	197.1			Ōda	Shimane
40	Iwami-Fukumitsu IC	National Route 9	199.5			Ōda	Shimane
–	Aonami IC	National Route 9			planning	Gōtsu	Shimane
–	Asari IC	Shimane Prefectural Route 302	206.0		planning	Gōtsu	Shimane
Planned route Through to Shimane Prefectural Route 302						Gōtsu	Shimane
Through to National Route 9 (Gōtsu Bypass)						Gōtsu	Shimane
	Gōtsu IC	National Route 9 (Gōtsu Bypass); Shimane Prefectural Route 330	0.0			Gōtsu	Shimane
	Gōtsu-Nishi IC	Shimane Prefectural Route 299	5.1			Gōtsu	Shimane
	Hamada-Higashi IC	Shimane Prefectural Route 254	11.1			Hamada	Shimane
3-2	Hamada JCT	Hamada Expressway	14.5		concurrent with Hamada Expressway	Hamada	Shimane
-	Hamada TB		15.2		concurrent with Hamada Expressway	Hamada	Shimane
4	Hamada IC	National Route 9 (Hamada Bypass)	15.8		concurrent with Hamada Expressway	Hamada	Shimane
	Aioi IC	National Route 186	17.8			Hamada	Shimane
	Takezako IC		19.8			Hamada	Shimane
	Harai IC	National Route 9 (Hamada Bypass)	22.2		westbound exit, eastbound entrance	Hamada	Shimane
	Hamada-kō IC	Shimane Prefectural Route 339				Hamada	Shimane
	Nishimura IC	National Route 9	30.3			Hamada	Shimane
	Iwami-Misumi IC	National Route 9	36.7			Hamada	Shimane
–	Okami IC	National Route 9			opening in 2025	Hamada	Shimane
–	Kamate IC	National Route 9			opening in 2025	Masuda	Shimane
	Tōta IC	National Route 9	51.9		eastbound exit, westbound entrance	Masuda	Shimane
	Kushiro IC	Shimane Prefectural Route 333	53.6		westbound exit, eastbound entrance	Masuda	Shimane
Through to Shimane Prefectural Route 333						Masuda	Shimane
	Takatsu IC	National Route 191; Shimane Prefectural Route 333	56.4		eastbound exit, westbound entrance	Masuda	Shimane
	Hagi-Iwami Kukō IC	Shimane Prefectural Route 331	58.1			Masuda	Shimane
	Suko IC	National Route 9	59.7			Masuda	Shimane
Planned route

=== Between Kiyo-Higashi Interchange and Ozuki Junction ===
Number	Name	Connections	Distance from Origin (km)	Bus Stop	Notes	Location	
Planned route
–	Kiyo-Higashi IC	National Route 191			planning	Abu	Yamaguchi
–	Kiyo-Nishi IC	National Route 191			planning	Abu	Yamaguchi
Planned route						Hagi	Yamaguchi
	Hagi IC	Yamaguchi Prefectural Route 32; Ogōri Hagi Road (planned)	0.0			Hagi	Yamaguchi
	Sanmi IC	Yamaguchi Prefectural Route 296	5.7			Hagi	Yamaguchi
	Akeishi IC; Akeishi PA	Yamaguchi Prefectural Route 64	8.1			Hagi	Yamaguchi
	Misumi IC	National Route 191	15.2			Nagato	Yamaguchi
Planned route						Nagato	Yamaguchi
–	Nagato IC	National Route 316	0.0			Nagato	Yamaguchi
–	Tawarayama IC	Yamaguchi Prefectural Route 34	5.5			Nagato	Yamaguchi
–	Tawarayama Onsen IC	Yamaguchi Prefectural Route 38			planning	Nagato	Yamaguchi
–	Toyoda IC	National Route 435			planning	Shimonoseki	Yamaguchi
Planned route						Shimonoseki	Yamaguchi
–	Ozuki JCT	Through to Chūgoku Expressway				Shimonoseki	Yamaguchi
