= Japan National Route 484 =

Road in Okayama prefecture, Japan

National Route 484
- 国道484号
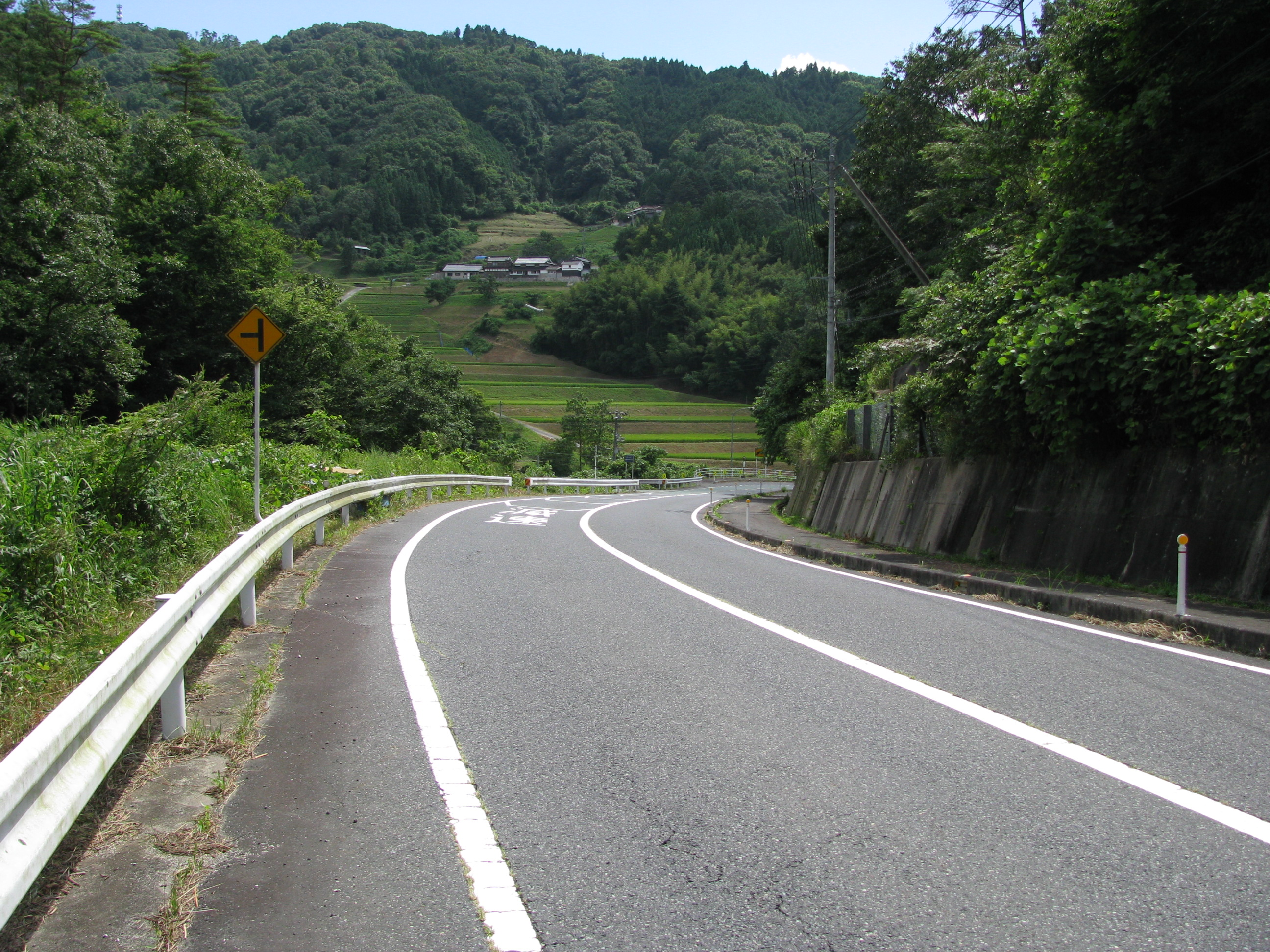

Route information
- Length: 62.9 km (39.1 mi)

Location
- Country: Japan

Highway system
- National highways of Japan; Expressways of Japan
← National Route 483	→ National Route 485

National Route 484 (国道484号) is a national highway of Japan in Okayama Prefecture that connects the cities of Bizen and Takahashi. The route has a total length of 62.9 kilometers (39.1 mi).
