= Maizuru-Wakasa Expressway =

National expressway in Japan

Maizuru-Wakasa Expressway
- 舞鶴若狭自動車道

Route information
- Length: 161.8 km (100.5 mi)
- Existed: 1987–present

Major junctions
- South end: Yokawa Junction; Chūgoku Expressway in Miki, Hyōgo (34.8955°N 135.1519°E)
- North end: Tsuruga Junction; Hokuriku Expressway in Tsuruga, Fukui (35.6341°N 136.0897°E)

Location
- Country: Japan
- Major cities: Sanda, Sasayama, Fukuchiyama, Maizuru, Obama

Highway system
- National highways of Japan; Expressways of Japan

The Maizuru-Wakasa Expressway (舞鶴若狭自動車道, Maizuru-Wakasa Jidōsha-dō) is a national expressway in Japan. It is owned and operated by West Nippon Expressway Company. It is signed as E27 under the Ministry of Land, Infrastructure, Transport and Tourism's "2016 Proposal for Realization of Expressway Numbering."

== Route description ==
Officially the expressway is referred to as the Kinki Expressway Tsuruga Route. This designation applies to the Maizuru-Wakasa Expressway as well as the Chūgoku Expressway beyond Yokawa Junction to Suita Junction.

The route of the expressway connects the coastline of the Japan Sea and the greater Osaka urban area by traversing the mountainous interior of the Kinki region.

Using the expressway to travel between the Chūgoku Expressway, Sanyō Expressway and Hokuriku Expressway is shorter and cheaper than using expressways that traverse a route via the greater Osaka urban area.

The expressway is 4 lanes from Yokawa Junction to Fukuchiyama Interchange and Ayabe Interchange to Ayabe Parking Area and the remainder is 2 lanes. Construction to expand the route to 4 lanes is currently underway on the section between Fukuchiyama Interchange and Ayabe Interchange and Ayabe Parking Area and Maizuru-Nishi Interchange. The speed limit is 80 km/h on 4-laned sections and 70 km/h on 2-laned sections.

== History ==
The first section of the expressway was opened to traffic in 1987 and the entire route was completed in 2014.

== List of interchanges and features ==
- IC - interchange, SIC - smart interchange, JCT - junction, SA - service area, PA - parking area, BS - bus stop, TN - tunnel, BR - bridge

| No. | Name | Connections | Dist. from Origin | Bus Stop | Notes | Location | |
|---|---|---|---|---|---|---|---|
| 6 | Yokawa JCT | Chūgoku Expressway | 0.0 | | | Miki | Hyōgo |
| - | Kami-Arakawa PA | | 1.5 | ◆ | | Miki | Hyōgo |
| 1 | Sanda-nishi IC | Pref. Route 92 (Sanda-nishi Inter Route) | 4.3 | ◆ | | Sanda | Hyōgo |
| - | Ōkawase Bus Stop | | | ◆ | | Sanda | Hyōgo |
| - | Furumori Bus Stop | | | ◆ | | Sasayama | Hyōgo |
| 2 | Tannan-Sasayamaguchi IC | Pref. Route 94 (Tannan-Sasayamaguchi Inter Route) | 22.5 | ◆ | | Sasayama | Hyōgo |
| - | Nishiki SA | | 25.6 | ◆ | | Sasayama | Hyōgo |
| - | Nakayama Bus Stop | | | ◆ | | Tamba | Hyōgo |
| 3 | Kasuga IC/JCT | National Route 175 / Kitakinki-Toyooka Expressway | 36.5 | ○ | | Tamba | Hyōgo |
| - | Ichijima Bus Stop | | | ◆ | | Tamba | Hyōgo |
| - | Mutsube PA | | 49.8; 49.9 | ◆ | For Yokawa, Toyooka for Kyoto, Tsuruga | Fukuchiyama | Kyoto |
| 4 | Fukuchiyama IC | National Route 9 | 53.5 | △ | | Fukuchiyama | Kyoto |
| 5 | Ayabe IC | Pref. Route 77 (Ayabe Inter Route) | 63.9 | | | Ayabe | Kyoto |
| 6 | Ayabe JCT | Kyoto Jūkan Expressway | 68.2 | | | Ayabe | Kyoto |
| - | Ayabe PA | | 70.7 | | | Ayabe | Kyoto |
| 7 | Maizuru-nishi IC | National Route 27; Pref. Route 27 (Ikeuchi Kyōda Route) | 76.3 | | | Maizuru | Kyoto |
| 8 | Maizuru-higashi IC | Pref. Route 28 (Ogura Nishi-Maizuru Route) | 87.0 | | | Maizuru | Kyoto |
| - | Maizuru PA | | 89.8 | | | Maizuru | Kyoto |
| 9 | Ōi-Takahama IC | Pref. Route 16 (Sakamoto Takahama Route) | 100.0 | | | Ōi | Fukui |
| 10 | Obama-nishi IC | National Route 27 | 111.5 | | | Obama | Fukui |
| - | Kato PA | | 112.8 | | | Obama | Fukui |
| 11 | Obama IC | Pref. Route 24 (Obama Kaminaka Route); Pref. Route 267 (Obama Inter Route) | 122.8 | | | Obama | Fukui |
| 12 | Wakasa-Kaminaka IC | Pref. Route 22 (Kaminaka Tagarasu Route) | 132.4 | | | Wakasa | Fukui |
| 12-1 | Mikatagoko PA/SIC | | 139.4 | | SIC opening in 2017 | Wakasa | Fukui |
| 13 | Wakasa-Mikata IC | National Route 27 | 141.6 | | | Wakasa | Fukui |
| 14 | Wakasa-Mihama IC | National Route 27 (Mihama-higashi Bypass) | 148.8 | | | Mihama | Fukui |
| 15-1 | Tsuruga-minami SIC | Pref. Route 211 (Yama Kushibayashi Route) | 155.1 | | SIC opening in 2016 | Tsuruga | Fukui |
| 3-1 | Tsuruga JCT | Hokuriku Expressway | 161.8 | | | Tsuruga | Fukui |
