= List of highways numbered 9W =

The following highways are numbered 9W:

- U.S. Route 9W
- Mississippi Highway 9W
- New York State Route 9W (1927–1930) (former)

== See also ==
- List of highways numbered 9
