= Minō Toll Road =

Road in Japan

Minō Toll Road
- 国道%route%号
- 箕面有料道路 (Minō Yūryōdōro); Minō Green Road 箕面グリーンロード (Minō Guriin Rōdo)

Route information
- Maintained by Osaka Prefectural Road Corporation
- Length: 7.2 km (4.5 mi)
- Existed: 30 May 2007–present
- Component highways: National Route 423 (Minoh Bypass)

Major junctions
- South end: Minoh. National Route 423 (Shinmidō-suji) / Osaka Prefecture Route 9
- North end: Minoh. National Route 423 / Shin-Meishin Expressway

Location
- Country: Japan

Highway system
- National highways of Japan; Expressways of Japan

The Minō Toll Road (箕面有料道路 Minō Yūryōdōro) is a two-lane toll road in Minoh, Osaka that connects the Shin-Meishin Expressway to the southern limits of the city via a tunnel under Mount Minō.

== History ==
The Minō Toll Road was opened to traffic on 30 May 2007 between its southern terminus at Osaka Route 9 and the northern terminus at the main line of Japan National Route 423. On 10 December 2017 the toll road was connected to the Shin-Meishin Expressway at the northern terminus of the toll road in addition to the already built junction with National Route 423.

== Junction list ==
The entire toll road is in Osaka Prefecture.

Location	km	mi	Exit	Name	Destinations	Notes
Through to National Route 423 (Shinmido-suji)
Minoh	0.0	0.0	—	Hakushima	Osaka Prefecture Route 9	Southern terminus of the toll road; southbound entrance, northbound exit
Minoh	7.2	4.5	13	Minō-Todoromi	National Route 423 / Shin-Meishin Expressway – Kyoto, Tsuyama, Okayama, Ikeda, Toyono	Northern terminus of the toll road
1.000 mi = 1.609 km; 1.000 km = 0.621 mi: Incomplete access
