= Highway 9 (Iraq) =

Road in Iraq

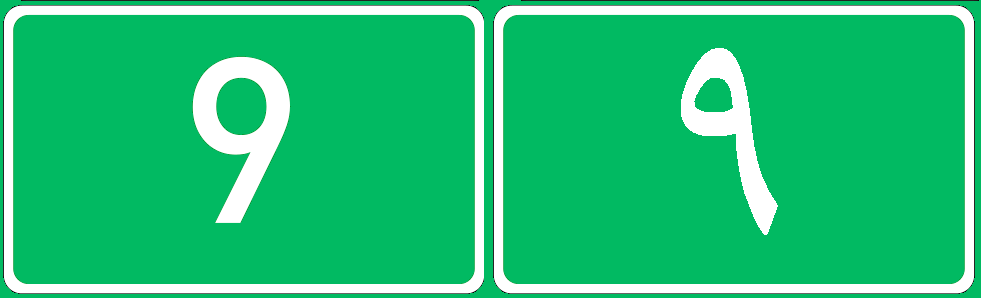
Highway 9
- ٩ طريق رقم

Location
- Country: Iraq

Highway system
- Highways in Iraq

Highway 9 is an Iraqi highway which extends from Karbala, through Al Najaf, to Al-Qādisiyyah. The highway saw military action during the U.S. Invasion of Iraq.
