= San'in Kinki Expressway =

Expressway in Japan

San-in Kinki Expressway
- 山陰近畿自動車道

Route information
- Maintained by West Nippon Expressway Company
- Length: 120 km (75 mi)
- Existed: 2005–present
- Component highways: National Route 9 / National Route 178 / National Route 312

Major junctions
- West end: Tottori Interchange; San'in Expressway in Tottori, Tottori
- East end: Miyazu Amano Hanashi Interchange; Kyoto Jūkan Expressway in Miyazu, Kyoto

Location
- Country: Japan

Highway system
- National highways of Japan; Expressways of Japan

San'in Kinki Expressway (山陰近畿自動車道, San'in Kinki Jidōsha-dō) is an incomplete expressway that, upon completion, will connect the San'in Expressway from Tottori interchange to the Kyoto Jūkan Expressway. When finished it will be about 120 kilometres (75 mi) long. It is owned and operated by partly by the Kyoto Prefectural Road Corporation and the Ministry of Land, Infrastructure, Transport and Tourism. It is numbered "E9" along with the Kyoto Jūkan Expressway and the San-in Expressway.

== Route description ==
As of December 2019, the San'in Kinki Expressway is an incomplete expressway linking the Kyoto Jūkan Expressway in Miyazu, Kyoto to the San'in Expressway in Tottori. It is made up of four east to west, separate sections that will eventually connect to one another upon the completion of the route.

== History ==
The San'in Kinki Expressway was designated as a planned route on 16 December 1994. On 27 March 2005, the section between Kasumi and Satsu interchanges was the first section of the expressway to open. The next section would open on 24 November 2008, between Higashihama and Igumi interchanges. Next, the expressway was extended west from Kasumi Interchange to Amarube Interchange on 12 December 2010. On 12 March 2011, a separate eastern section of the expressway opened between Yoza-Amanohashidate Interchange and Miyazu-Amanohashidate Interchange. On 22 March 2014, the section between Fukube Interchange and Iwami Interchange opened. From Iwami Interchange, the expressway was extended east to Uratomi on 26 March 2016. On the eastern section, the expressway was extended from Yoza-Amanohashidate Interchange to Kyōtango-Ōmiya Interchange on 30 October 2016. On 26 November 2017 the expressway was extended west from Amarube Interchange to Shin'onsen-Hamasaka Interchange.

== List of interchanges and features ==
- IC - interchange, SIC - smart interchange, JCT - junction, SA - service area, PA - parking area, TN - tunnel, TB - toll gate

| No. | Name | Connections | Dist. from Origin | Notes | Location | |
|---|---|---|---|---|---|---|
| (9) | Tottori JCT | San'in Expressway (planned); Tottori Expressway (planned) | | planning | Tottori | Tottori |
| 12.0 km gap in the expressway, connection is made by National Route 9 | | | | | Tottori | Tottori |
| | Fukube IC | National Route 9 Tottori Prefectural Route 43; Tottori Prefectural Route 265 | 0.0 | | Tottori | Tottori |
| | Ōtani IC | Tottori Prefectural Route 27 | | eastbound exit, westbound entrance | Iwami | Tottori |
| | Iwami IC | National Route 9 Tottori Prefectural Route 325 | 6.6 | | Iwami | Tottori |
| | Uratomi IC | Tottori Prefectural Route 155 | 8.5 | | Iwami | Tottori |
| 3.8 km gap in the expressway, connection is made by National Route 178 | | | | | Iwami | Tottori |
| | Higashihama IC | National Route 178; Tottori Prefectural Route 256 | 12.3 | | Iwami | Tottori |
| | Iigumi IC | National Route 178; Hyōgo Prefectural Route 128 | 15.8 | | Shin'onsen | Hyōgo |
| 7.6 km gap in the expressway, connection is made by National Route 178 | | | | | Shin'onsen | Hyōgo |
| 5 | Shin'onsen-Hamasaka IC | National Route 178; Hyōgo Prefectural Route 47 | 0.0 | | Shin'onsen | Hyōgo |
| 4 | Kuto IC | Hyōgo Prefectural Route 257 | | westbound exit, eastbound entrance | Shin'onsen | Hyōgo |
| 3 | Amarube IC | National Route 178; Hyōgo Prefectural Route 4 | 9.8 | | Kami | Hyōgo |
| 2 | Kasumi IC | Hyōgo Prefectural Route 4 Hyōgo Prefectural Route 11 | 15.1 | | Kami | Hyōgo |
| 1 | Satsu IC | National Route 178; Hyōgo Prefectural Route 256 | 21.3 | | Kami | Hyōgo |
| 7.6 km gap in the expressway, connection is made by National Route 178 | | | | | | Hyōgo |
| | (Takeno-chō, Toyooka) | | | planning | Toyooka | Hyōgo |
| | Toyooka-Kita IC/JCT | Kitakinki-Toyooka Expressway (planned) | | planning | Toyooka | Hyōgo |
| | (Shimotsurui, Toyooka) | | | planning | Toyooka | Hyōgo |
| Planned route Through to National Route 178 | | | | | | Hyōgo |
| | Amino IC | | | planning | Kyōtango | Kyoto |
| | Mineyama-Yasaka IC | | | planning | Kyōtango | Kyoto |
| | Ōyama-Mineyama IC | | 0.0 | planning | Kyōtango | Kyoto |
| 5.0 km gap in the expressway, connection is made by National Route 312 | | | | | Kyōtango | Kyoto |
| | Kyōtango-Ōmiya IC | Kyoto Prefectural Route 651; Kyoto Prefectural Route 655 | 5.0 | | Kyōtango | Kyoto |
| | Kyōtango-Ōmiya IC | Kyoto Prefectural Route 651; Kyoto Prefectural Route 655 | 5.0 | | Yosano | Kyoto |
| | Yoza-Amanohashidate IC | National Route 176; National Route 312 | 9.3 | | Yosano | Kyoto |
| | Yoza-Amanohashidate IC | National Route 176; National Route 312 | 9.3 | | Miyazu | Kyoto |
| 1 | Miyazu-Amanohashidate IC | Kyoto Prefectural Route 9 | 15.7 | | Miyazu | Kyoto |
Through to Kyoto Jūkan Expressway
