= List of highways numbered 9E =

The following highways are numbered 9E:

== United States ==
- U.S. Route 9E (former)
- Georgia State Route 9E (former)
- New York State Route 9E (former)

== See also ==
- List of highways numbered 9
