= Otokuni District =

District in Kyōto prefecture, Japan

Coordinates: 34°54′00″N 135°41′26″E

Location of Ōyamazaki in Kyoto prefecture

Otokuni (乙訓郡, Otokuni-gun) is a district located in Kyoto Prefecture, Japan.

As of 2003, the district has an estimated population of 15,493 and a density of 2,595.14 persons per km^{2}. The total area is 5.97 km^{2}.

== Towns and villages ==
- Ōyamazaki
