= Japan National Route 485 =

Road in Shimane prefecture, Japan

National Route 485
- 国道485号
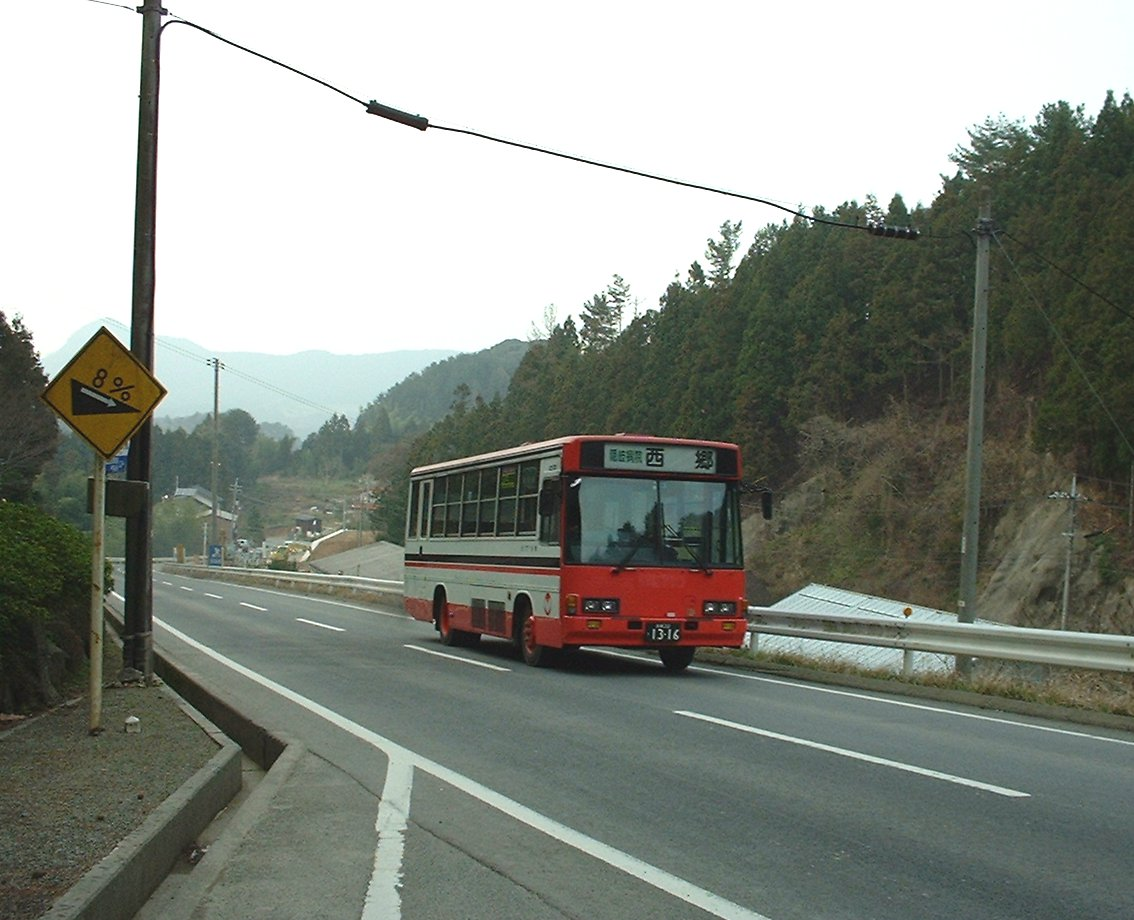

Route information
- Length: 67.5 km (41.9 mi)

Location
- Country: Japan

Highway system
- National highways of Japan; Expressways of Japan
← National Route 484	→ National Route 486

National Route 485 is a national highway of Japan connecting Okinoshima, Shimane and Matsue, Shimane in Japan, with a total land length of 67.5 kilometers (41.9 mi). A further 97.6 kilometres (60.6 mi) of the route exists as a maritime section linking the Oki Islands with Honshu.
