= Amerikamura =

Retail and entertainment district in Osaka, Japan

Coordinates: 34.672086°N 135.49796°E

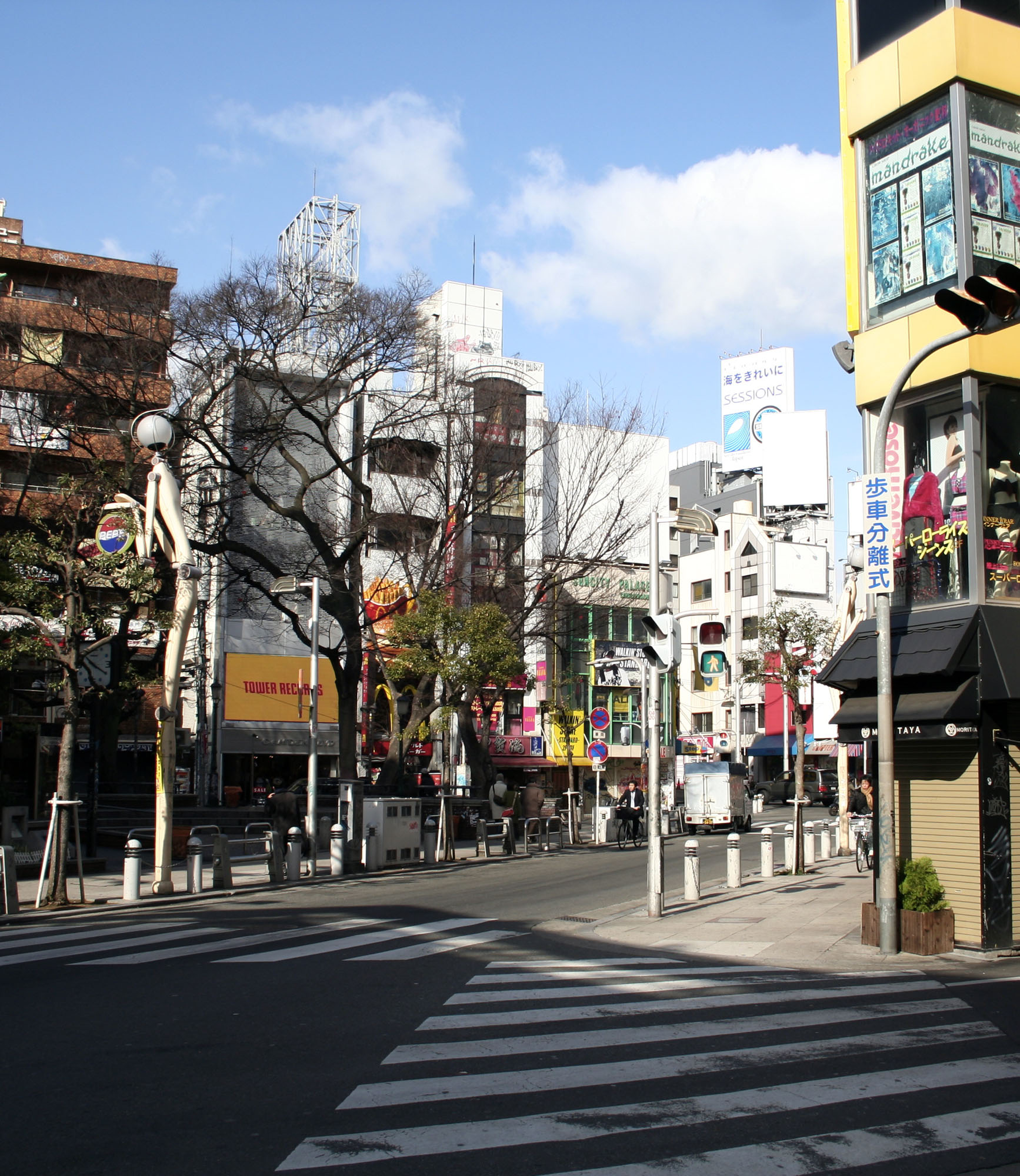
Triangle Park on a slow day

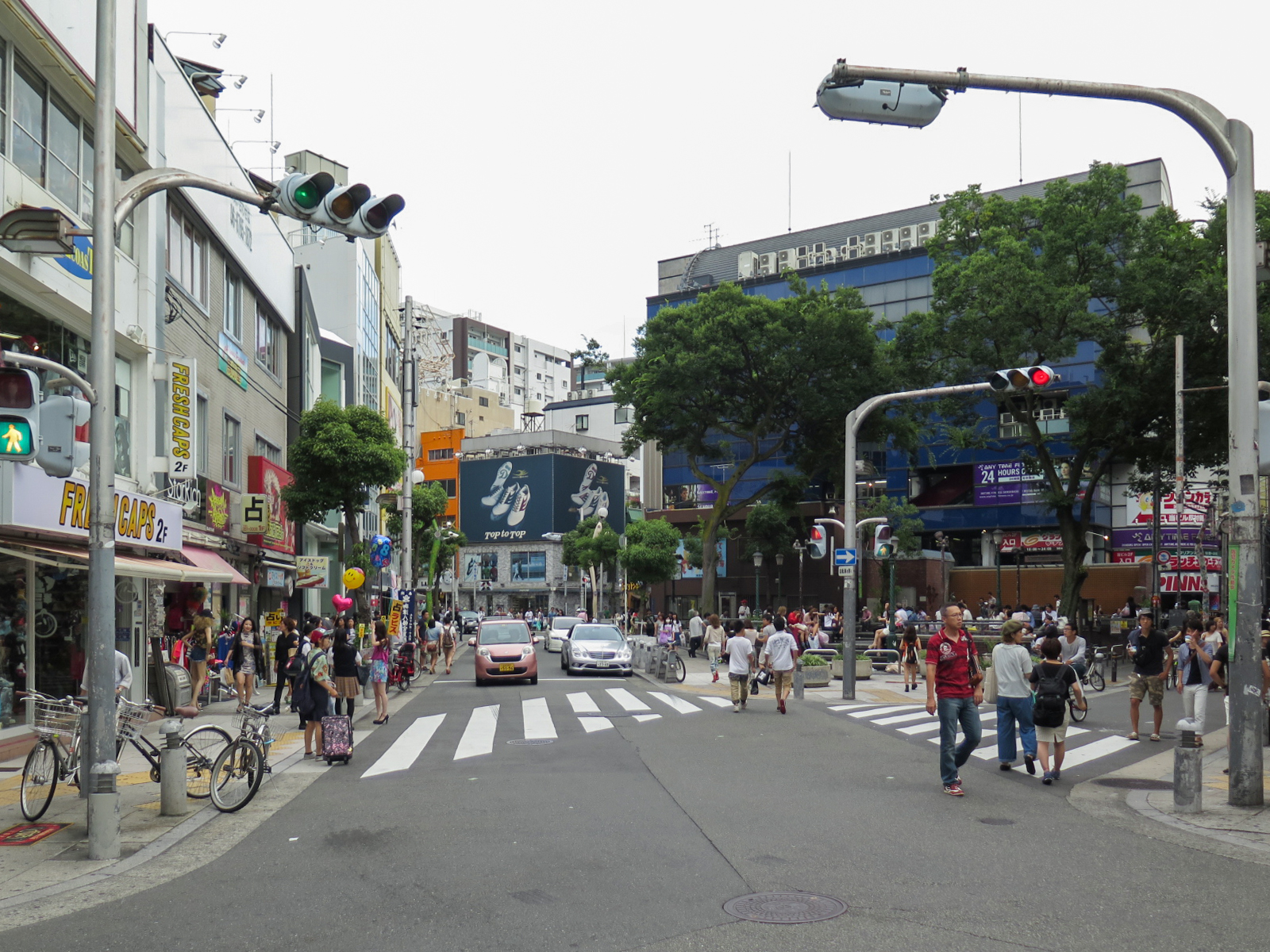
Triangle Park on a busy day

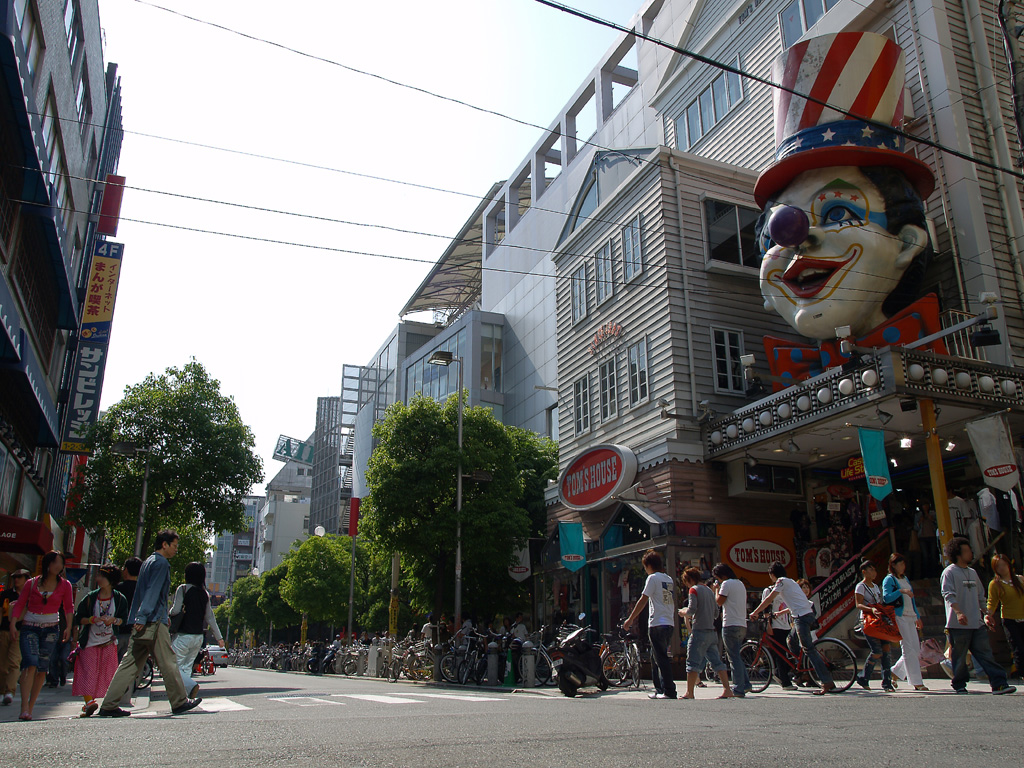
American-Village in 2006

Amerikamura (also America mura; Japanese: アメリカ村, lit. 'American Village') is a retail and entertainment area in the Chūō-ku district of Osaka, Japan. It is usually referred to by locals as "Ame-mura" (アメ村). Amerikamura is an area stretching from Nagahori Street to Dōtonbori (道頓堀), located in the west side of the Shinsaibashi station.

In the 1970s, warehouses in Amerikamura sold imported American vintage clothes, jeans, second-hand records and other goods from the West Coast of the United States.

Amerikamura is identifiable by a small-scale reproduction of the Statue of Liberty. The area centres on Triangle Park (三角公園 also known as 御津公園), a small concrete rest area surrounded by retail outlets of Western fashions, bars and nightclubs, some of which are run by or cater to Westerners. Osaka's registered foreign population is a small fraction of the total population; the makeup of the crowds and retail space in Ame-mura is predominantly Japanese. Locally, Ame-mura is known for being a place for observing Japanese street fashion and Japanese pop culture.

In 1983, the "Peace on Earth" mural was painted in Amerikamura by artist Seitaro Kuroda.
