= B9 =

B9, B IX or B-9 may refer to:

== Science ==
- Prodelphinidin B9, a plant phenolic compound
- Vitamin B_{9}, another name for folic acid
- B-Nine WSG, a formulation of the plant growth regulator daminozide
- Boron-9 (B-9 or ^{9}B), an isotope of boron
- A subclass of B-class stars

== Transport ==
- B9 (Croatia), a road part of the Istrian Y highway complex
- B9 (New York City bus) serving Brooklyn
- Bundesstraße 9, a federal highway in Germany
- Iran Airtour (IATA code B9)
- Air Bangladesh (former IATA code B9)

== Vehicles ==
- Bavarian B IX, an 1874 German steam locomotive model
- Bavarian B IX (Ostbahn), an 1869 German steam locomotive model
- Bensen B-9, a 1958 American small helicopter
- Boeing B-9 (sometimes referred to as the Y1B-9 or YB-9), a 1931 United States Army Air Corps bomber
- HMS B9, a British Royal Navy B-class submarine
- LNER Class B9, a class of British steam locomotives
- The former model name for the Subaru Tribeca

== Organizations ==
- The abbreviation used for the record label Bridge Nine
- Bucharest Nine (B9), a group of nine NATO members: Bulgaria, the Czech Republic, Estonia, Hungary, Latvia, Lithuania, Poland, Romania and Slovakia

== Other uses ==
- Iceberg B-9, a 1987 iceberg calved away from Antarctica
- Model B-9 on the TV series Lost in Space, otherwise known simply as “Robot (Lost in Space)“
- An international standard paper size (44×62 mm), defined in ISO 216

== See also ==
- 9B (disambiguation)
