= E9 (countries) =

International organization

The E9 is a forum of nine countries, which was formed to achieve the goals of UNESCO's Education For All (EFA) initiative. The “E” stands for education and the “9” represents the following nine countries: Bangladesh, Brazil, China, Egypt, India, Indonesia, Mexico, Nigeria and Pakistan, representing over half of the world's population and 70% of the world's illiterate adults. E-9 Initiative was launched in 1993 at the EFA Summit in New Delhi, India. E-9 Initiative has become a forum for the countries to discuss their experiences related to education, exchange best practices, and monitor EFA-related progress.

The aim of the initiative is to accelerate the improvement and promotion of the Sustainable Development Goal 4 agenda by driving rapid change in education systems in three of the 2020 Global Education Meeting priorities:

1. Support to teachers;
2. Investment in skills;
3. Narrowing of the digital divide.

== Socioeconomic status ==
E-9 countries have made significant socioeconomic progress. Brazil, China, India, Indonesia and Mexico are the Members of G-20. Mexico is an OECD member, while China is now the second largest economy in the world. Brazil and India are also the top ten economies. Indonesia has also been growing fast. In 1993, the E-9 countries accounted for only 16.5% of world's nominal GDP. Now, they represent almost 30% of world's nominal GDP.

== See also ==
- G6 (EU)
- G8
- G20
- E7 (countries)
- Group of Five
