= Japan National Route 482 =

Road in Japan

National Route 482
- 国道482号
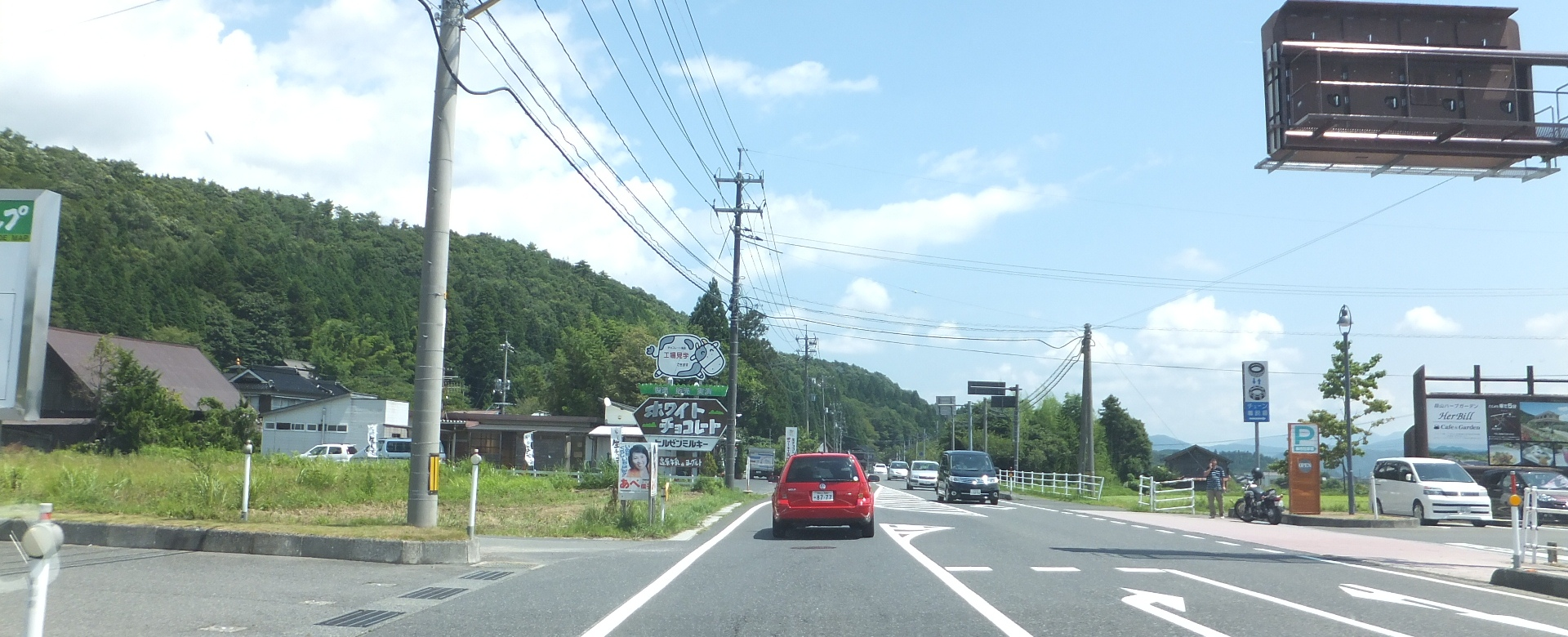

Route information
- Length: 324.7 km (201.8 mi)

Location
- Country: Japan

Highway system
- National highways of Japan; Expressways of Japan
← National Route 481	→ National Route 483

National Route 482 is a national highway of Japan connecting between Miyazu, Kyoto and Yonago, Tottori in Japan, with total length has 324.7 km (201.8 mi).
