= Kyoto Jūkan Expressway =

Expressway in Kyoto Prefecture, Japan

Kyoto-Jukan Expressway
- 京都縦貫自動車道

Route information
- Maintained by West Nippon Expressway Company and Kyoto Prefecture Road Corporation
- Length: 93.2 km (57.9 mi)
- Existed: 1988–present
- Component highways: National Route 478

Major junctions
- North end: Miyazu-Amanohahidate Interchange; San'in Kinki Expressway in Miyazu
- South end: Ōyamazaki Junction; AH1 Meishin Expressway; Keiji Bypass; National Route 171 in Ōyamazaki

Location
- Country: Japan

Highway system
- National highways of Japan; Expressways of Japan

The Kyoto Jūkan Expressway (京都縦貫自動車道, Kyōto Jūkan Jidōsha-dō) is a national expressway in Kyoto Prefecture. It is owned and operated primarily by the West Nippon Expressway Company (NEXCO West Japan) and the Kyoto Prefecture Road Corporation. The route is signed E9 under Ministry of Land, Infrastructure, Transport and Tourism's "2016 Proposal for Realization of Expressway Numbering."

== Route description ==
The expressway is owned by the Kyoto Prefecture Road Corporation from its northern terminus to Tamba Interchange where ownership switches over to NEXCO West Japan for the remainder of the route south to Ōyamazaki Junction.

== Junction list ==
The entire expressway is in Kyoto Prefecture. TB= Toll booth, PA= Parking Area

Location	km	mi	Exit	Name	Destinations	Notes
Through to San'in Kinki Expressway
Miyazu	0	0.0	1/TB	Miyazu-Amanohashidate	Kyoto Prefecture Route 9– National Route 176, Amanohashidate, Central Miyazu, Fukuchiyama, Ōe	
Maizuru	11.2	7.0	2	Maizuru-Ōe	Kyoto Prefecture Route 533– Miyazu, Amanohashidate, National Route 175	
Maizuru	11.9	7.4	PA	Yuragawa		
Ayabe	23.4	14.5	3	Ayabe	Maizuru-Wakasa Expressway– Maizuru, Osaka	
Ayabe	26.3	16.3	3-1	Ayabe-Ankokuji	National Route 27– Kyoto, Tanba, Hyōgo, Tsuruga, Fukui, Maizuru	
Kyōtamba	33.1	20.6	4	Kyōtamba-Wachi	National Route 27– Kyoto, Kameoka, Tsuruga, Maizuru	
Kyōtamba	44.6	27.7	5	Kyōtamba-Mizuho	National Route 173– Ayabe, Ikeda, Osaka, National Route 9, Fukuchiyama	
Kyōtamba	50.6	31.4	PA	Kyōtamba		
Kyōtamba	52.6	32.7	6	Tamba	National Route 9– Kyoto, Maizuru, Fukuchiyama	
Nantan	58.0	36.0	7	Sonobe	Kyoto Prefecture Route 19– Sonobe, National Route 9	
Nantan	62.4	38.8	8	Yagi-nishi	Kyoto Prefecture Route 408	Northbound exit, southbound entrance
Nantan	62.6	38.9	TB	Yagi		
Nantan	63.2	39.3	9	Yagi-naka	National Route 9– Kyoto, Kameoka, Fukuchiyama, Tanba, Hyōgo	Northbound entrance, southbound exit
Nantan	63.9	39.7	PA	Nantan		
Nantan	64.9	40.3	10	Yagi-higashi	Kyoto Prefecture Route 455	Northbound exit, southbound entrance
Kameoka	67.8	42.1	11	Chiyokawa	Kyoto Prefecture Route 73– Sasayama, Hyōgo, National Route 9, National Route 372	
Kameoka	70.3	43.7	12	Ōi	Kyoto Prefecture Route 407– National Route 9	
Kameoka	72.9	45.3	13	Kameoka	National Route 372 National Route 423– Sasayama, Ikeda, National Route 9	
Kameoka	78.2	48.6	TB	Shino		
Kameoka	78.4	48.7	14	Shino	Kameoka City Road 9– National Route 9	
Nishikyō-ku, Kyoto	83.6	51.9	15	Kutsukake	National Route 9	Northbound entrance, southbound exit
Nishikyō-ku, Kyoto	85.1	52.9	16	Ōharano	Kyoto Prefecture Route 10, Kyoto Prefecture Route 141– National Route 9, Central Kyoto, Rakusai New Town, Nagaokakyō, Mukō	
Nagaokakyō	91.9	57.1	17	Nagaokakyō	Kyoto Prefecture Route 10	
Ōyamazaki	93.2	57.9	33-3	Ōyamazaki	AH1 Meishin Expressway– Suita, Osaka, Nagoya	
Through to Keiji Bypass
1.000 mi = 1.609 km; 1.000 km = 0.621 mi: Incomplete access

== See also ==
- Japan National Route 478
- West Nippon Expressway Company
