= List of highways numbered 9B =

The following highways are numbered 9B:

== United States ==
- Florida State Road 9B
- Maine State Route 9B
- Nebraska Recreation Road 9B
- New York State Route 9B
