= Japan National Route 478 =

Road in Kyoto prefecture, Japan

National Route 478
- 国道478号
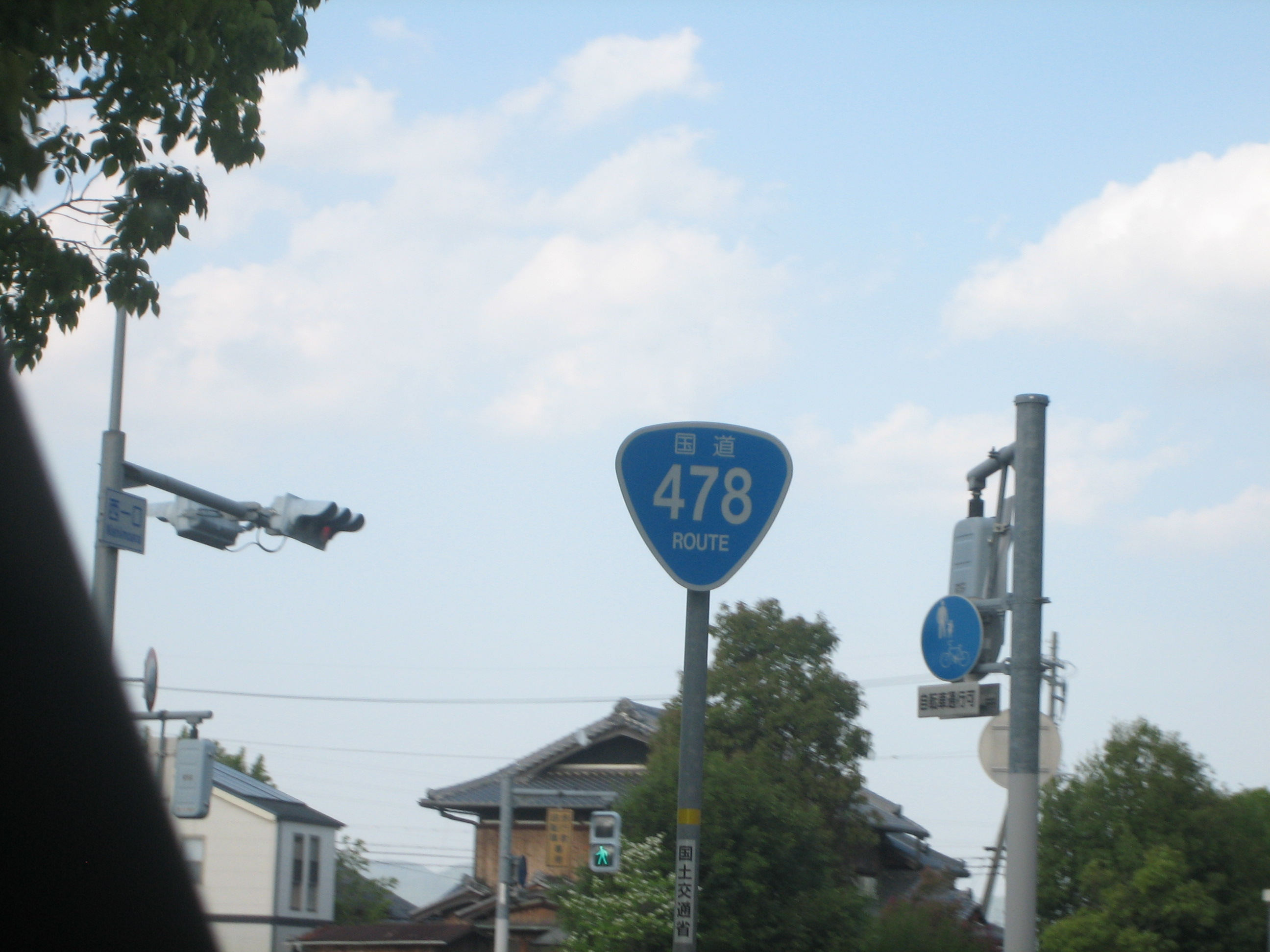

Route information
- Length: 63.9 km (39.7 mi)

Location
- Country: Japan

Highway system
- National highways of Japan; Expressways of Japan
← National Route 477	→ National Route 479

National Route 478 is a national highway of Japan connecting between Miyazu, Kyoto and Kumiyama, Kyoto in Japan, with total length has 63.9 kilometers (39.7 mi).

A major part of the road is known as the Kyoto Jūkan Expressway (京都縦貫自動車道, Kyōto Jūkan Jidōshadō), a toll road connecting Fushimi-ku, Kyoto and Miyazu, Kyoto managed by West Nippon Expressway Company.
