= Japan National Route 312 =

Road in Japan

National Route 312
- 国道312号
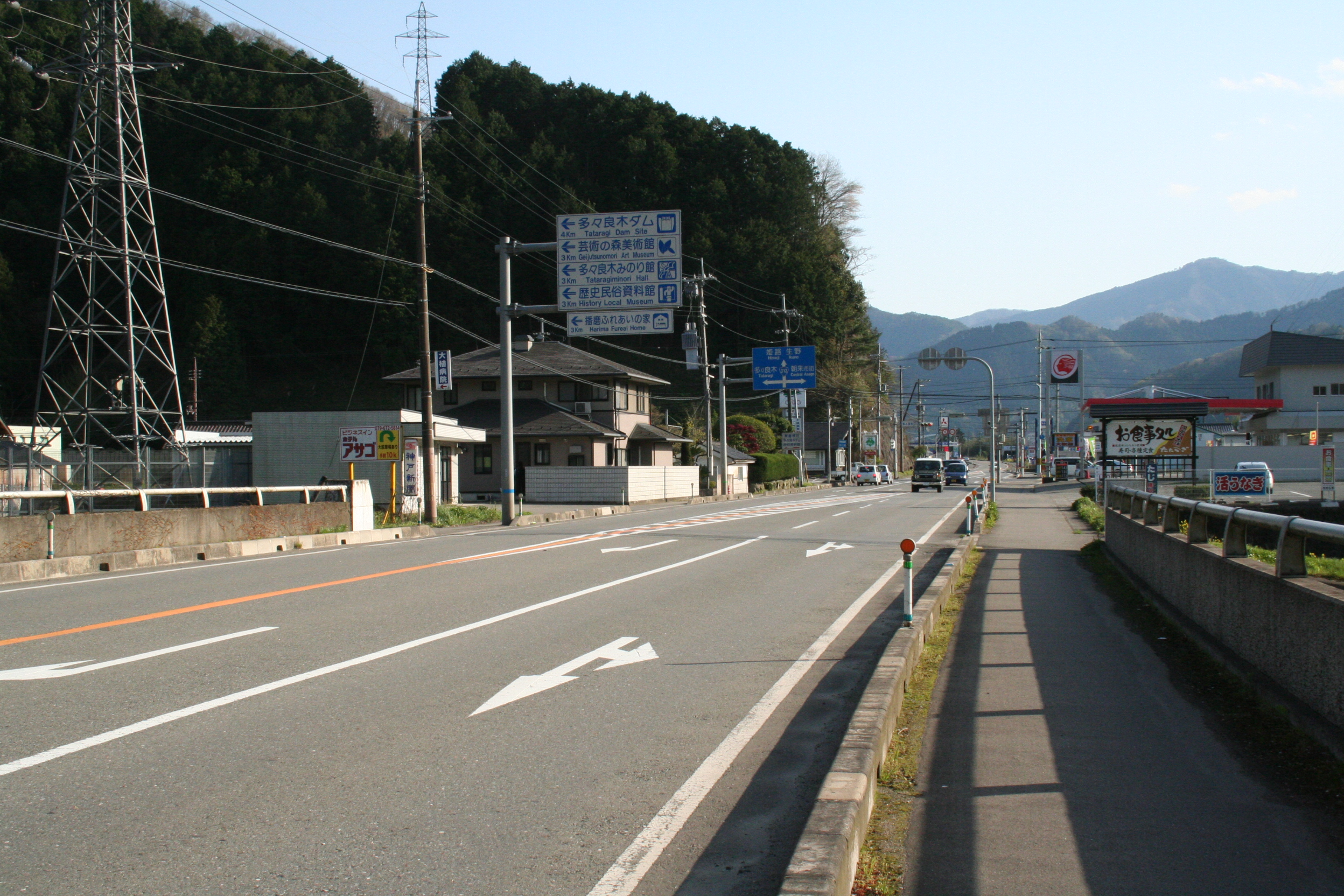

Route information
- Length: 153.5 km (95.4 mi)

Location
- Country: Japan

Highway system
- National highways of Japan; Expressways of Japan
← National Route 311	→ National Route 313

National Route 312 is a national highway of Japan connecting Miyazu, Kyoto and Himeji, Hyōgo in Japan, with a total length of 153.5 km (95.38 mi).
