= Japan National Route 171 =

Road in Japan

National Route 171
- 国道171号
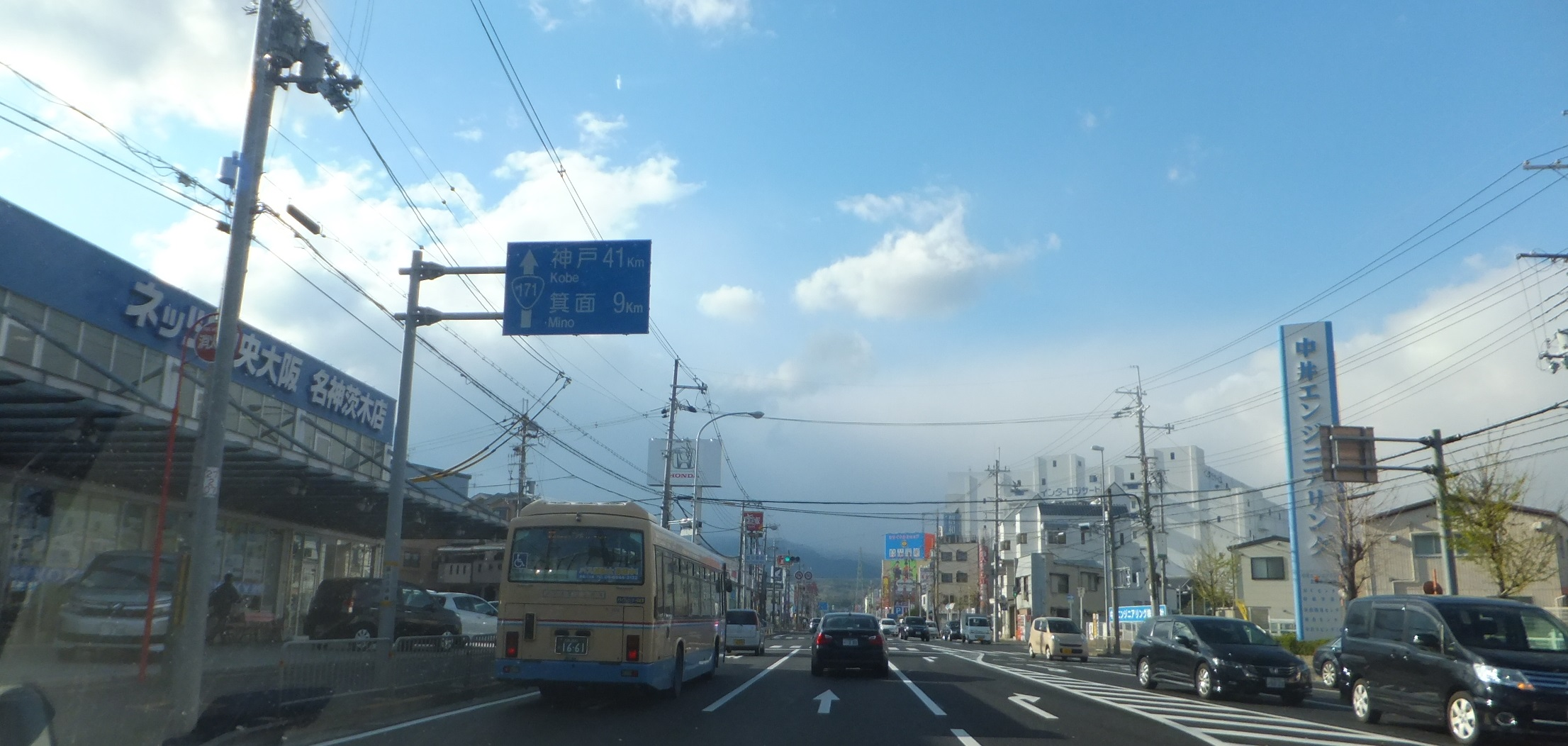

Route information
- Length: 67.7 km (42.1 mi)
- Existed: 18 May 1953–present

Major junctions
- North end: Minami-ku, Kyoto
- South end: National Route 2 in Chūō-ku, Kobe

Location
- Country: Japan

Highway system
- National highways of Japan; Expressways of Japan
← National Route 170	→ National Route 172

National Route 171 is a national highway of Japan connecting Minami-ku, Kyoto and Chūō-ku, Kobe in Japan, with a total length of 67.7 km (42.07 mi). Almost exactly in the middle of the highway's length lies an ancient ryokan built in 1635 called the Tsubaki Shogunate's Inn. Records show that Asano Naganori of Forty-seven rōnin fame stayed every year between 1697 and 1701's Ako incident. The inn burnt down in 1718 but was rebuilt and still exists today, remaining unchanged for almost 300 years.
