= Kyoto Prefecture =

Prefecture of Japan

Kyoto Prefecture 京都府
- Prefecture

Japanese transcription(s)
  - Japanese: 京都府
  - Rōmaji: Kyōto-fu
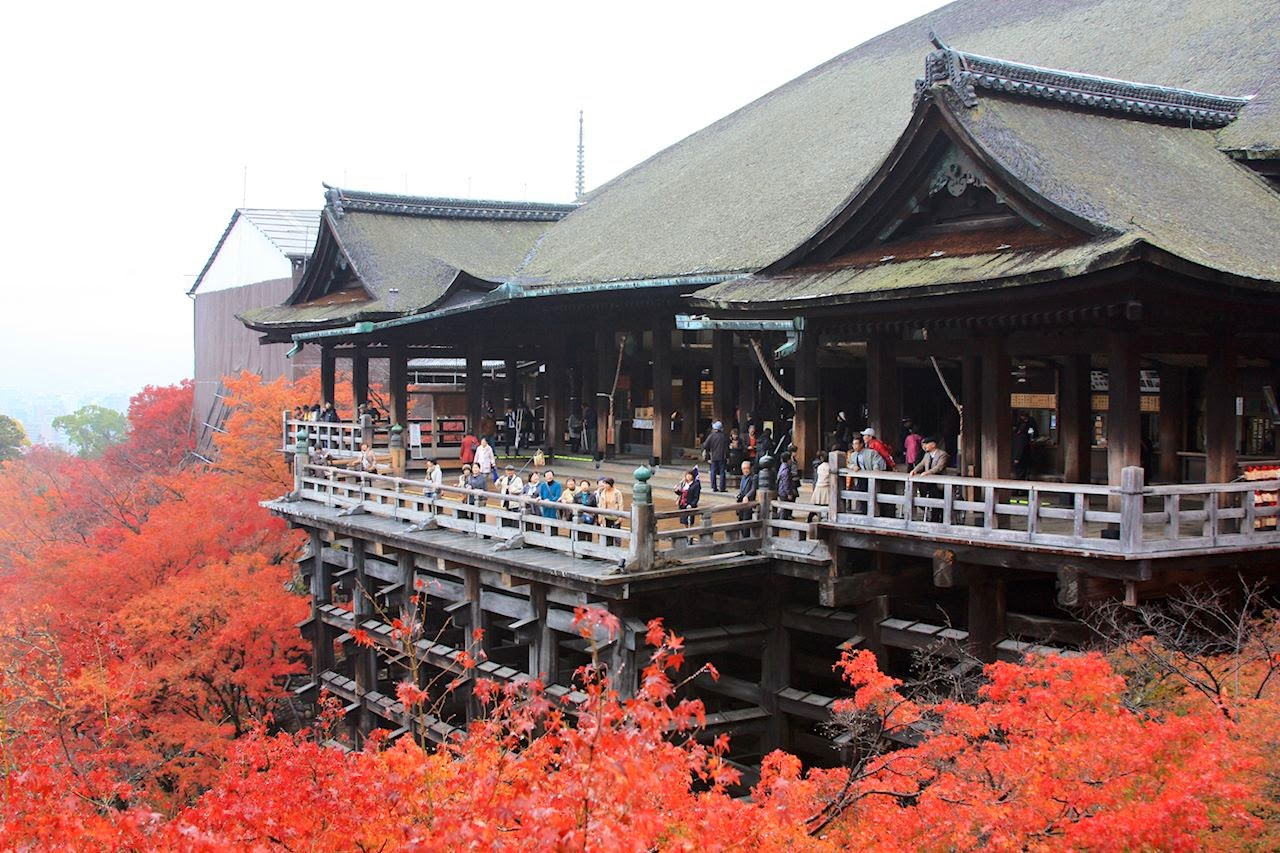
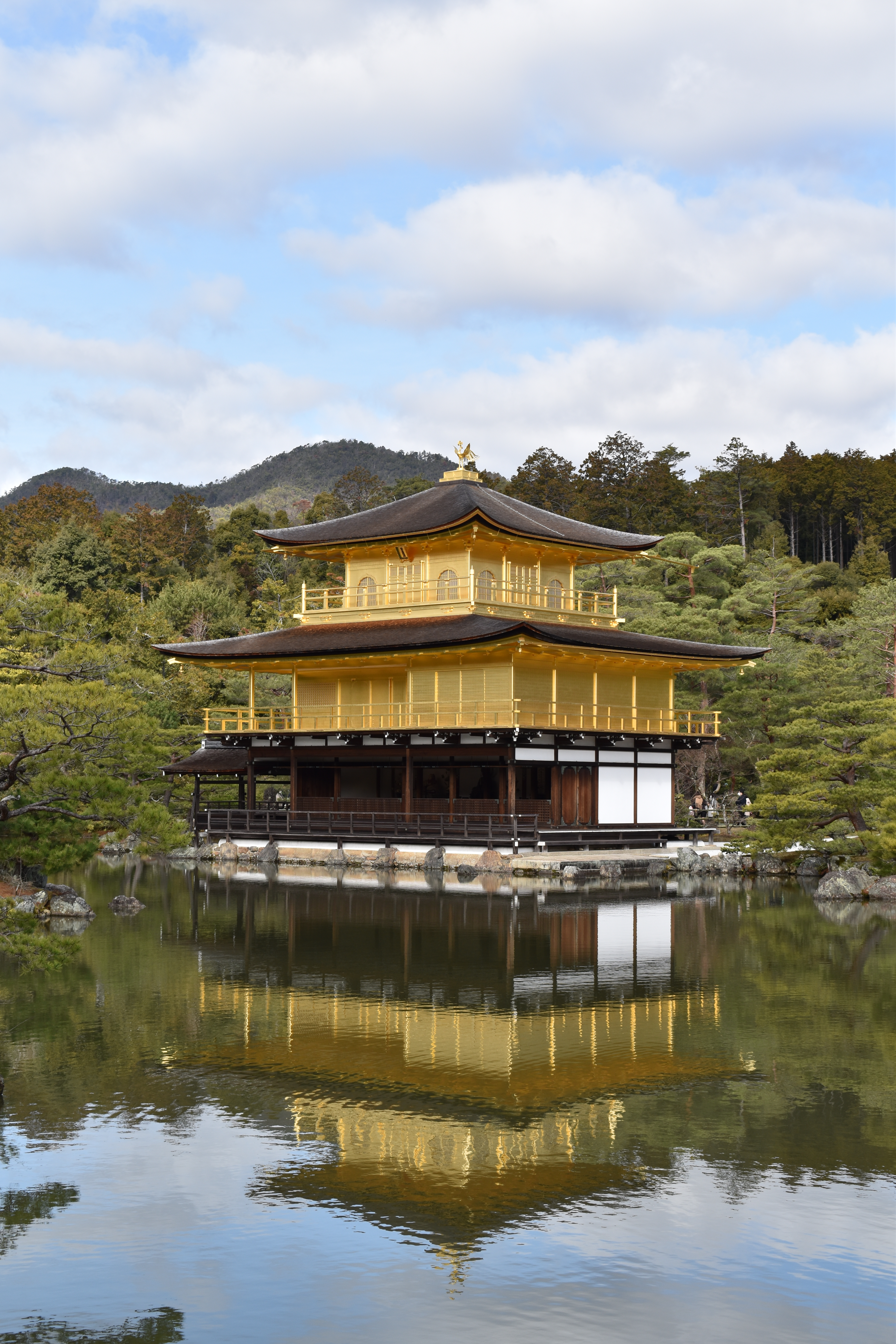
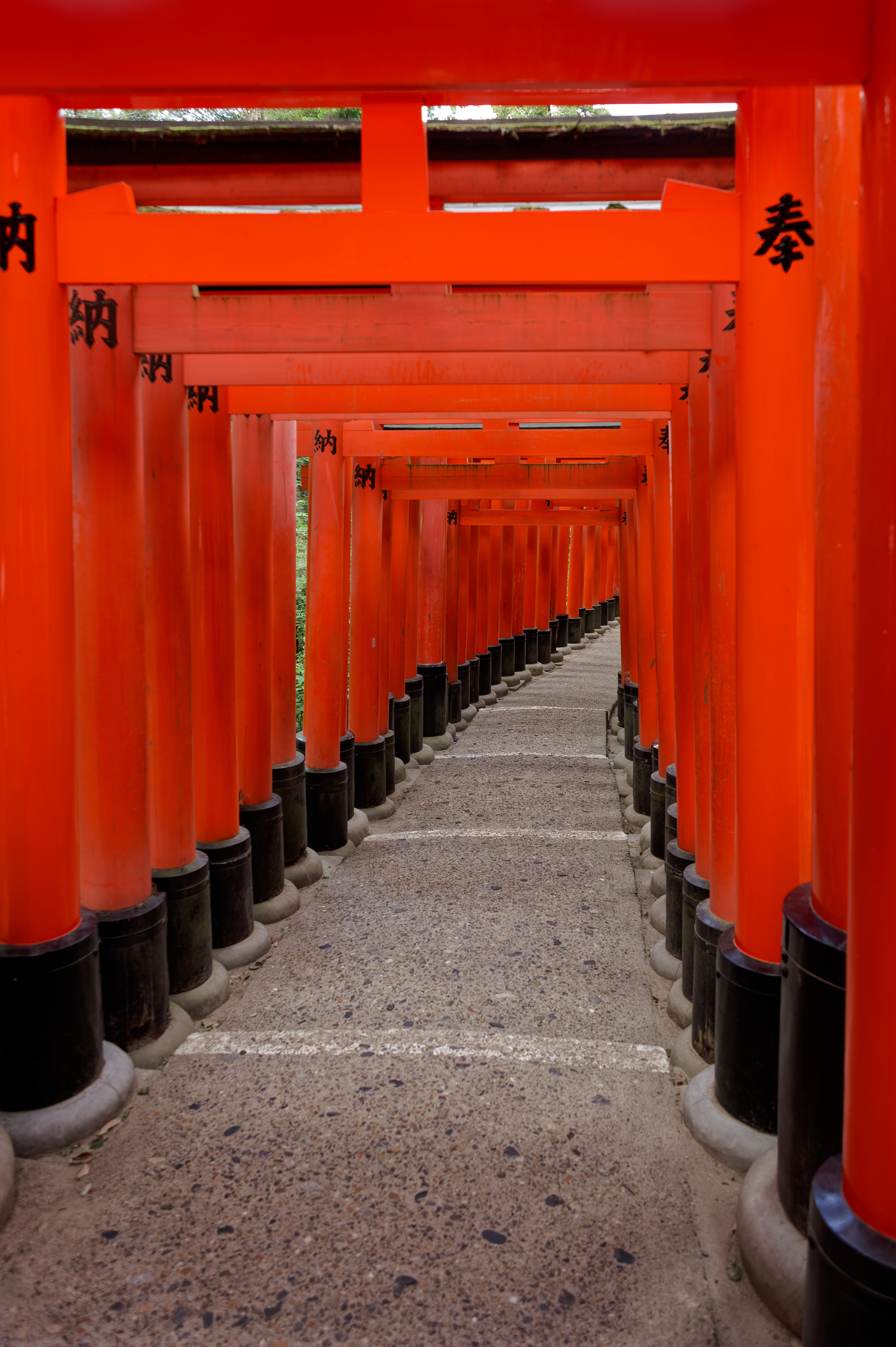
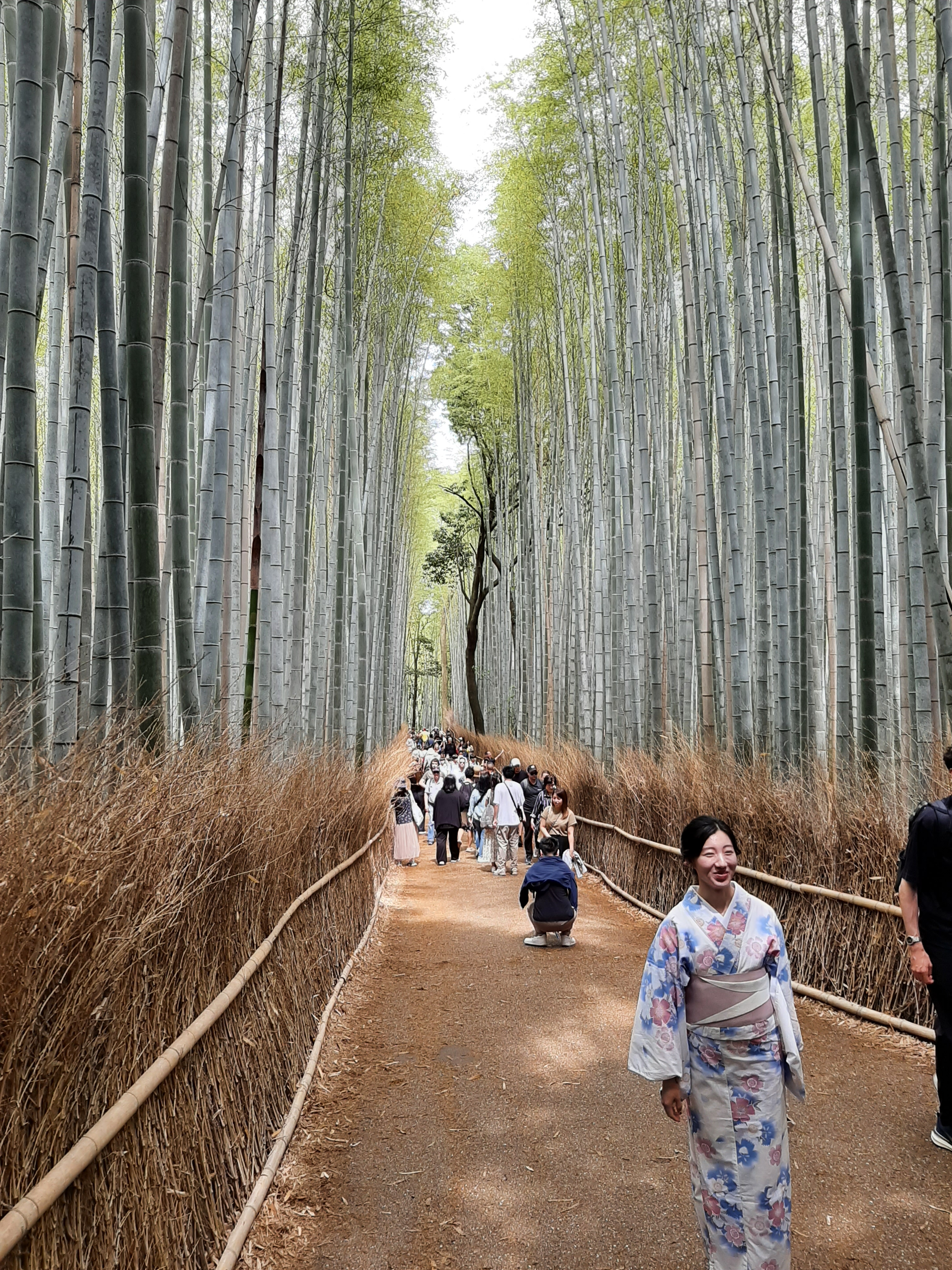
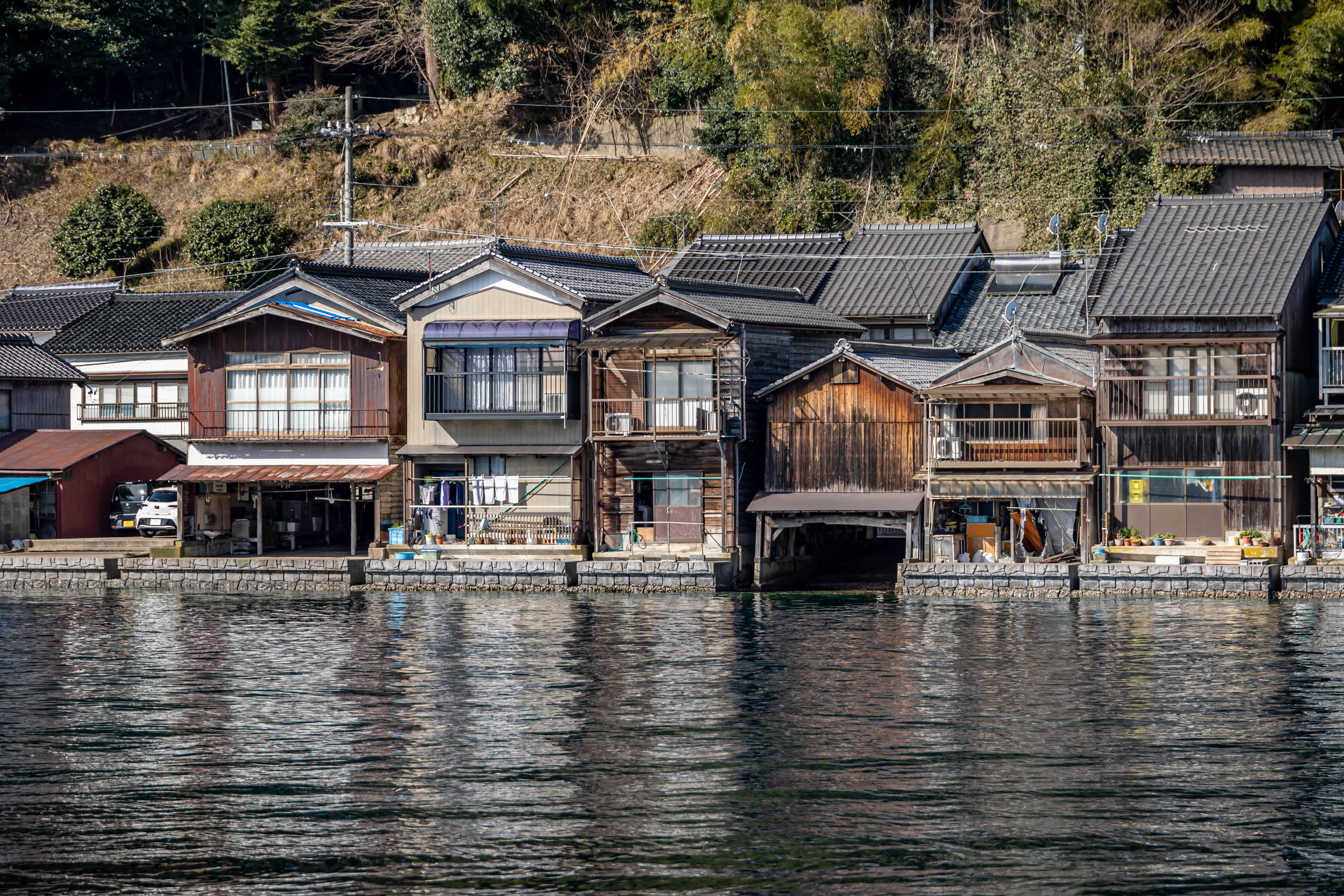
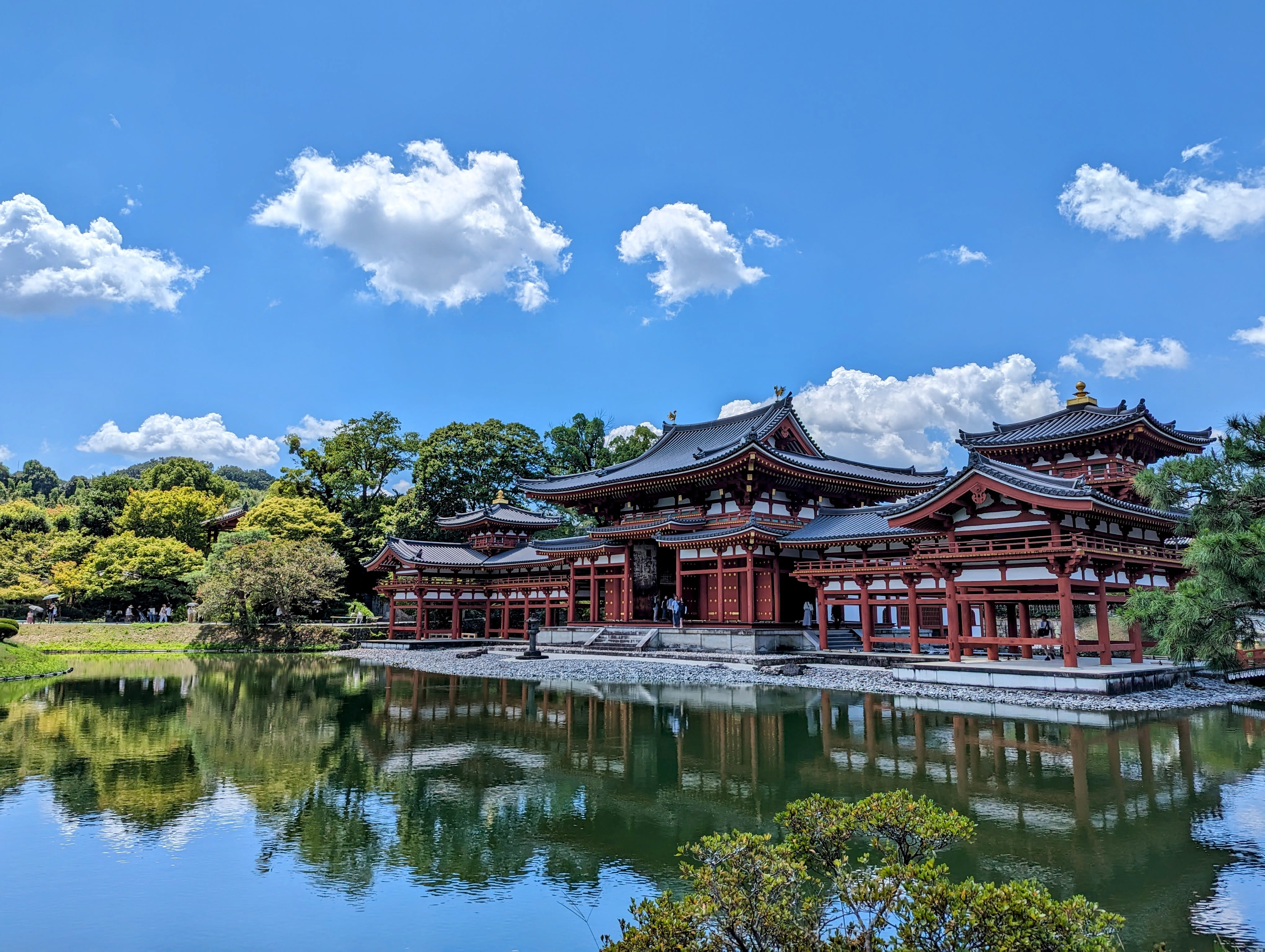
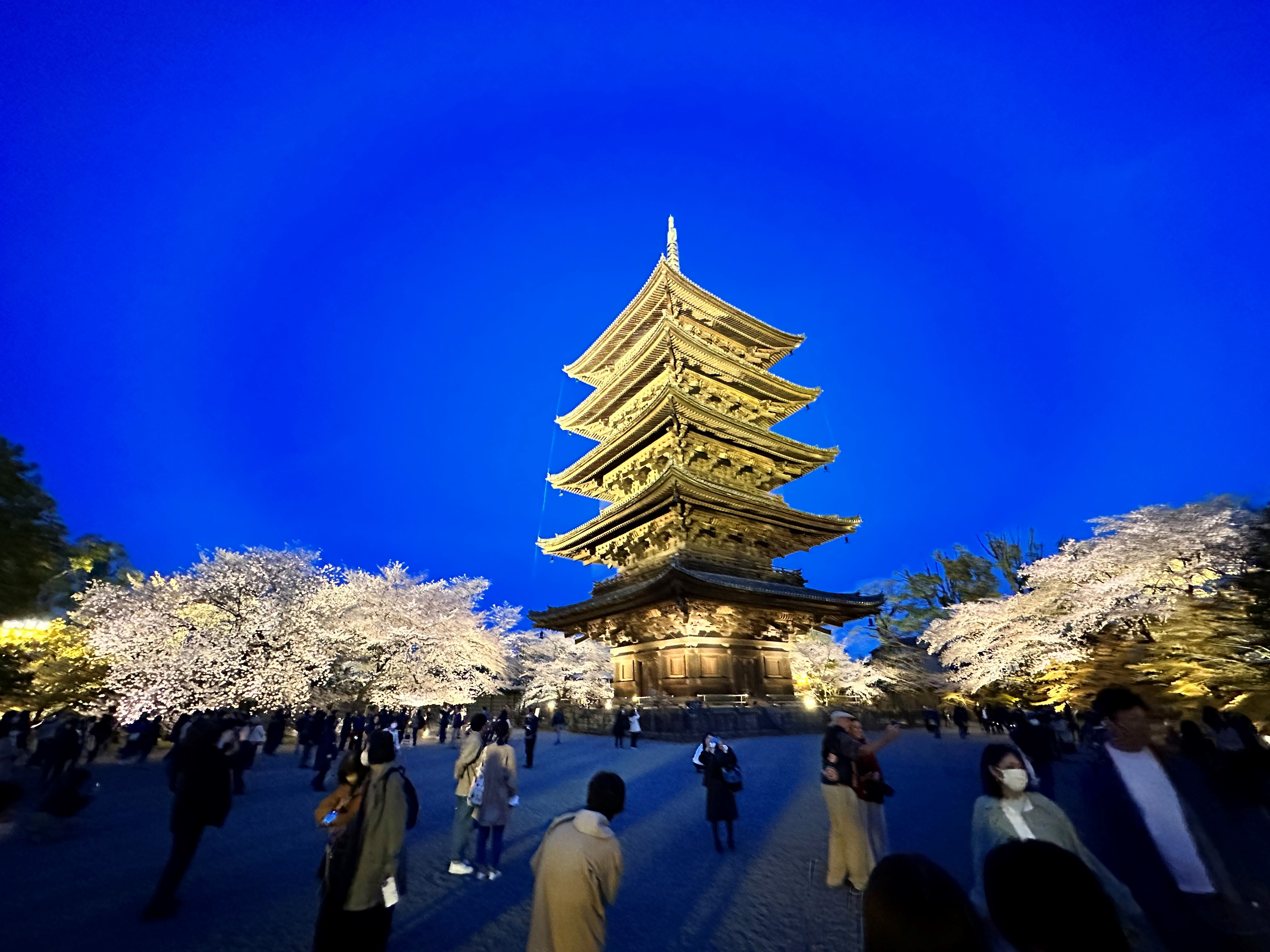
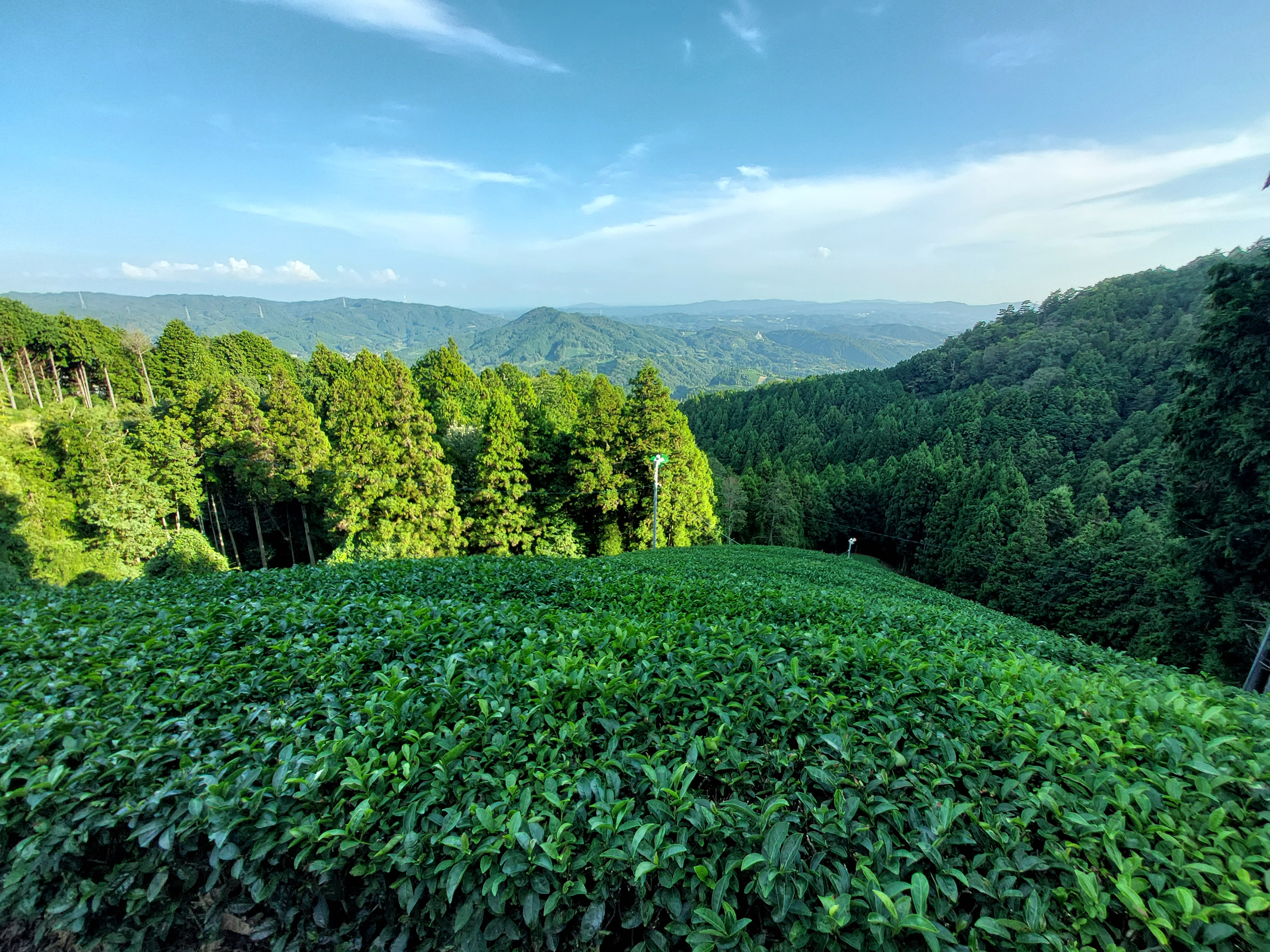
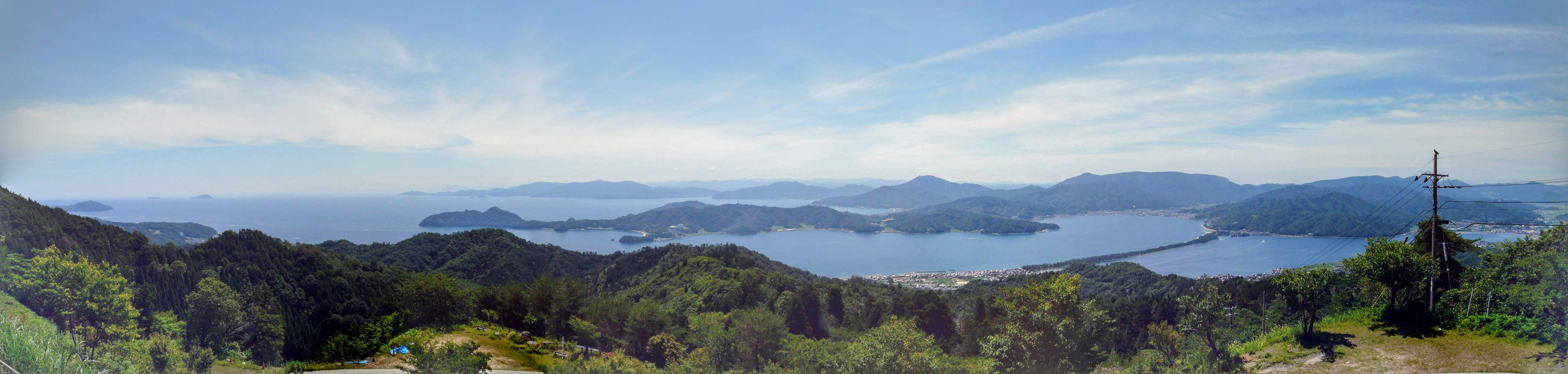
- Kiyomizu Temple Kinkakuji Fushimi Inari-taisha Sagano Bamboo forest in Arashiyama Ine-ura Byōdō-in Tō-ji Tea Plantation in Uji Panorama view of Amanohashidate and Miyazu Bay

- Flag Symbol
- Anthem: Kyoto-fu no uta
- Interactive map of Kyoto Prefecture
- Coordinates: 35°1′18″N 135°45′20.2″E
- Country: Japan
- Region: Kansai
- Island: Honshu
- Capital: Kyoto City
- Subdivisions: Districts: 6, Municipalities: 26

Government
  - Governor: Takatoshi Nishiwaki

Area
  - Total: 4,612.19 km^{2} (1,780.78 sq mi)
  - Rank: 31st

Population (1 October 2020)
  - Total: 2,578,087
  - Rank: 13th
  - Density: 566/km^{2} (1,470/sq mi)

GDP
  - Total: JP¥ 11,108 billion US$ 82.1 billion (2022)
- ISO 3166 code: JP-26
- Website: www.pref.kyoto.jp/en/index.html
- Symbols of Japan
- Bird: Streaked shearwater (Calonectris leucomelas)
- Flower: Weeping cherry blossom (Prunus spachiana)
- Tree: Kitayama Sugi (Cryptomeria japonica)

Kyoto Prefecture (京都府, Kyōto-fu; Japanese pronunciation: [k̟ʲj̊ó̞ò̞.tò̞, k̟ʲj̊ò̞ó̞.tó̞.ɸɯ̈̀, k̟ʲj̊ó̞ó̞.tó̞-], locally [k̟ʲj̊ó̞ò̞.tò̞, k̟ʲj̊ó̞ó̞.tó̞.ɸù, -hù]) is a prefecture of Japan located in the Kansai region of Honshu. It has a population of 2.48 million and has a geographic area of 4,612 square kilometres (1,781 sq mi). It borders Fukui Prefecture to the northeast, Shiga Prefecture to the east, Mie Prefecture to the southeast, Nara Prefecture and Osaka Prefecture to the south, and Hyōgo Prefecture to the west.

Kyoto, the capital and largest city, hosts 57% of the prefecture's total population. Other major cities includes Kameoka, Maizuru, and Uji. The prefecture is located on the Sea of Japan's coast and extends to the southeast towards the Kii Peninsula, covering territory of the former provinces of Tamba, Tango, and Yamashiro. It is centered on the historic capital of Kyoto, and is one of two prefectures in Japan (with Osaka) using the designation fu rather than the standard ken. Kyoto has made Kyoto Prefecture one of the most popular tourism destinations in Japan, and 21% of the prefecture's land area is designated as Natural Parks. The prefecture forms part of the Keihanshin metropolitan area, which is the second most populated region in Japan after the Greater Tokyo area and one of the world's most productive regions by GDP.

== History ==
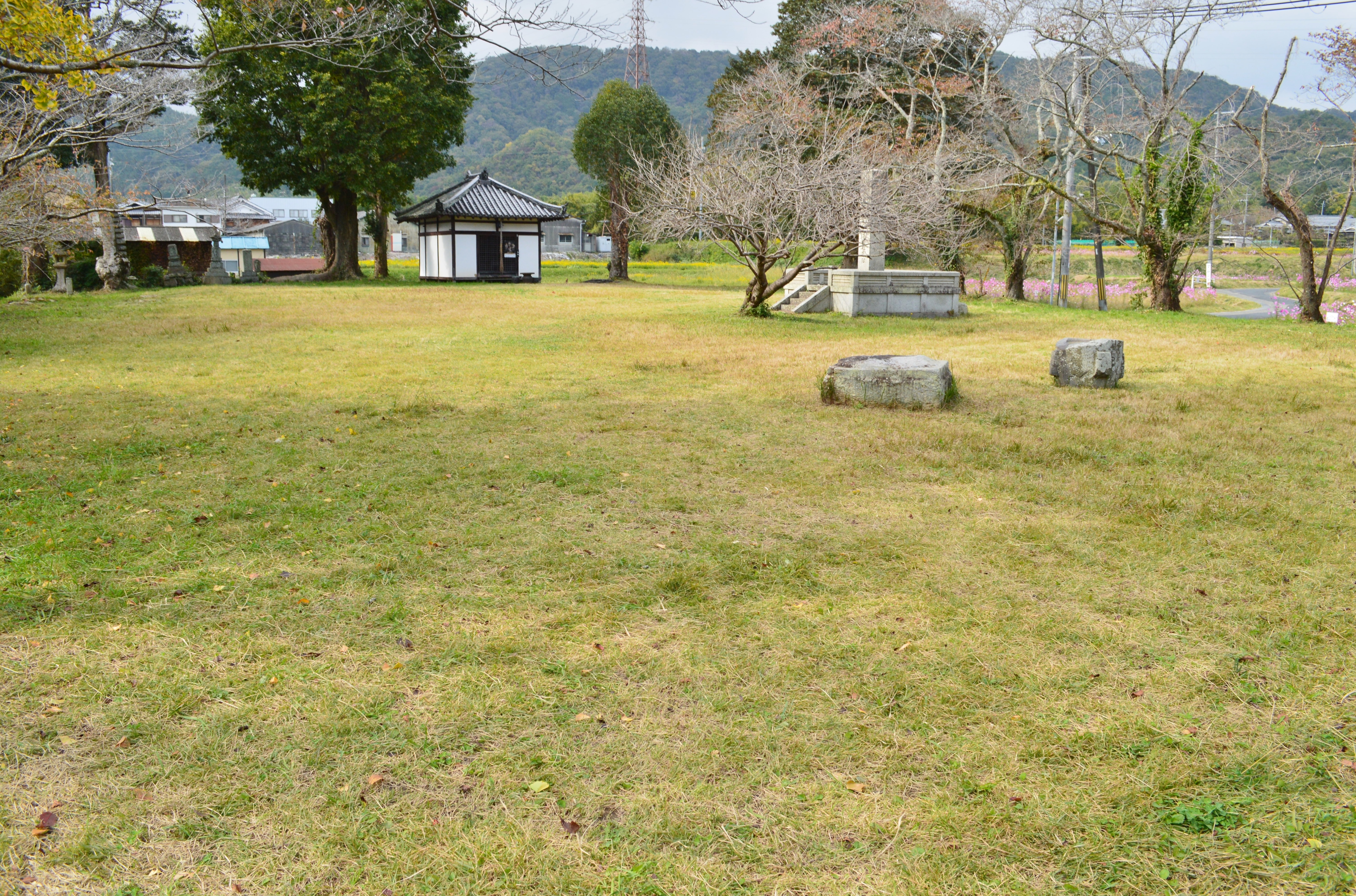
Kuni-kyō

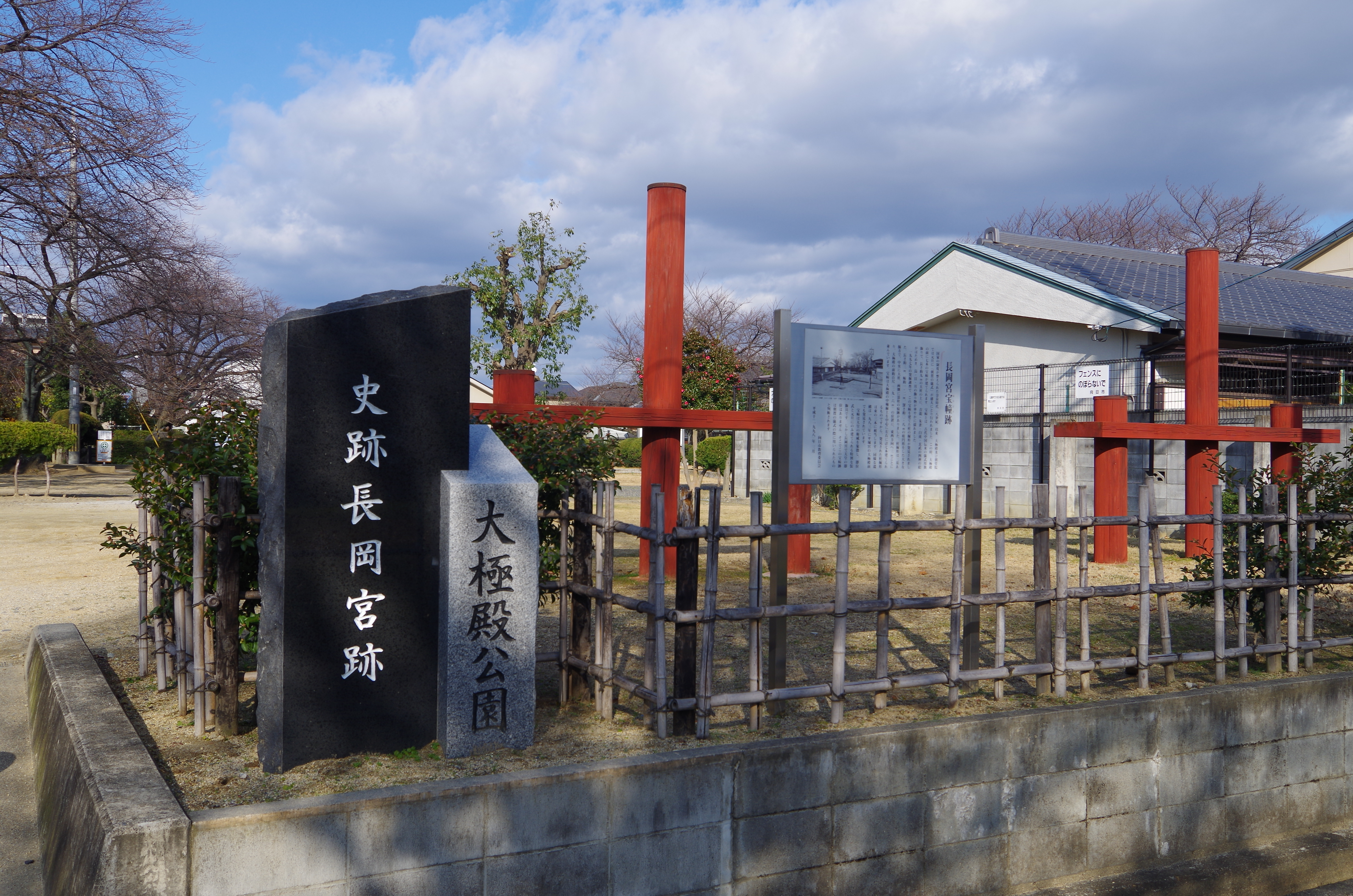
Nagaoka-kyō, a Capital of Japan in Otokuni Palace

Until the Meiji Restoration, the area of Kyoto Prefecture was known as Yamashiro.

For most of its history, the city of Kyoto was Japan's Imperial capital. The city's history can be traced back as far as the 6th century. In 544, the Aoi Matsuri was held in Kyoto to pray for good harvest and good weather.

Kyoto did not start out as Japan's capital. A noteworthy earlier capital was Nara. In 741, Emperor Shōmu moved the capital briefly to Kuni-kyo, between the cities of Nara and Kyoto, in present-day Kyoto Prefecture. In 784, the capital was moved to Nagaokakyō, also in present-day Kyoto Prefecture. In 794, Emperor Kanmu moved the capital to Heian-kyō, and this was the beginning of the current-day city of Kyoto. Even today, almost all of the streets, houses, stores, temples and shrines in Kyoto exist where they were placed in this year.

Although in 1192 real political power shifted to Kamakura, where a samurai clan established the shogunate, Kyoto remained the imperial capital as the powerless emperors and their court continued to be seated in the city. Imperial rule was briefly restored in 1333, but another samurai clan established a new shogunate in Kyoto three years later.

In 1467, a great civil war, the Ōnin War, took place inside Kyoto, and most of the town was burned down. Japan plunged into the age of warring feudal lords. A new strong man, Tokugawa Ieyasu, established the shogunate at Edo (today's Tokyo) in 1603.

In the 15th century AD, tea-jars were brought by the shōguns to Uji in Kyoto from the Philippines which was used in the Japanese tea ceremony.

The Meiji Restoration returned Japan to imperial rule in 1868. Emperor Meiji, who was now the absolute sovereign, went to stay in Tokyo during the next year. The imperial court has not returned to Kyoto since then. During the instigation of Fuhanken Sanchisei in 1868, the prefecture received its suffix fu. The subsequent reorganization of the old provincial system merged the former Tango Province, Yamashiro Province and the eastern part of Tanba Province into today's Kyoto Prefecture.

Although many Japanese major cities were heavily bombed during World War II, the old capital escaped such devastation. During the occupation, the U.S. Sixth Army and I Corps were headquartered in Kyoto.

== Geography ==
Kyoto Prefecture is almost in the center of Honshu and of Japan. It covers an area of 4,612.19 square kilometres (1,780.78 sq mi), which is 1.2% of Japan. Kyoto is the 31st largest prefecture by size. To the north, it faces the Sea of Japan and Fukui Prefecture. To the south, it faces Osaka and Nara Prefectures. To the east, it faces Mie and Shiga Prefectures. To its west is Hyōgo Prefecture. The prefecture is separated in the middle by the Tanba Mountains. This makes its climate very different in the north and south.

As of April 2016, 21% of the prefecture's land area was designated as Natural Parks, namely Sanin Kaigan National Park; Biwako, Kyoto Tamba Kogen, Tango-Amanohashidate-Ōeyama and Wakasa Wan Quasi-National Parks; and Hozukyō, Kasagiyama, and Rurikei Prefectural Natural Parks.

=== Municipalities ===
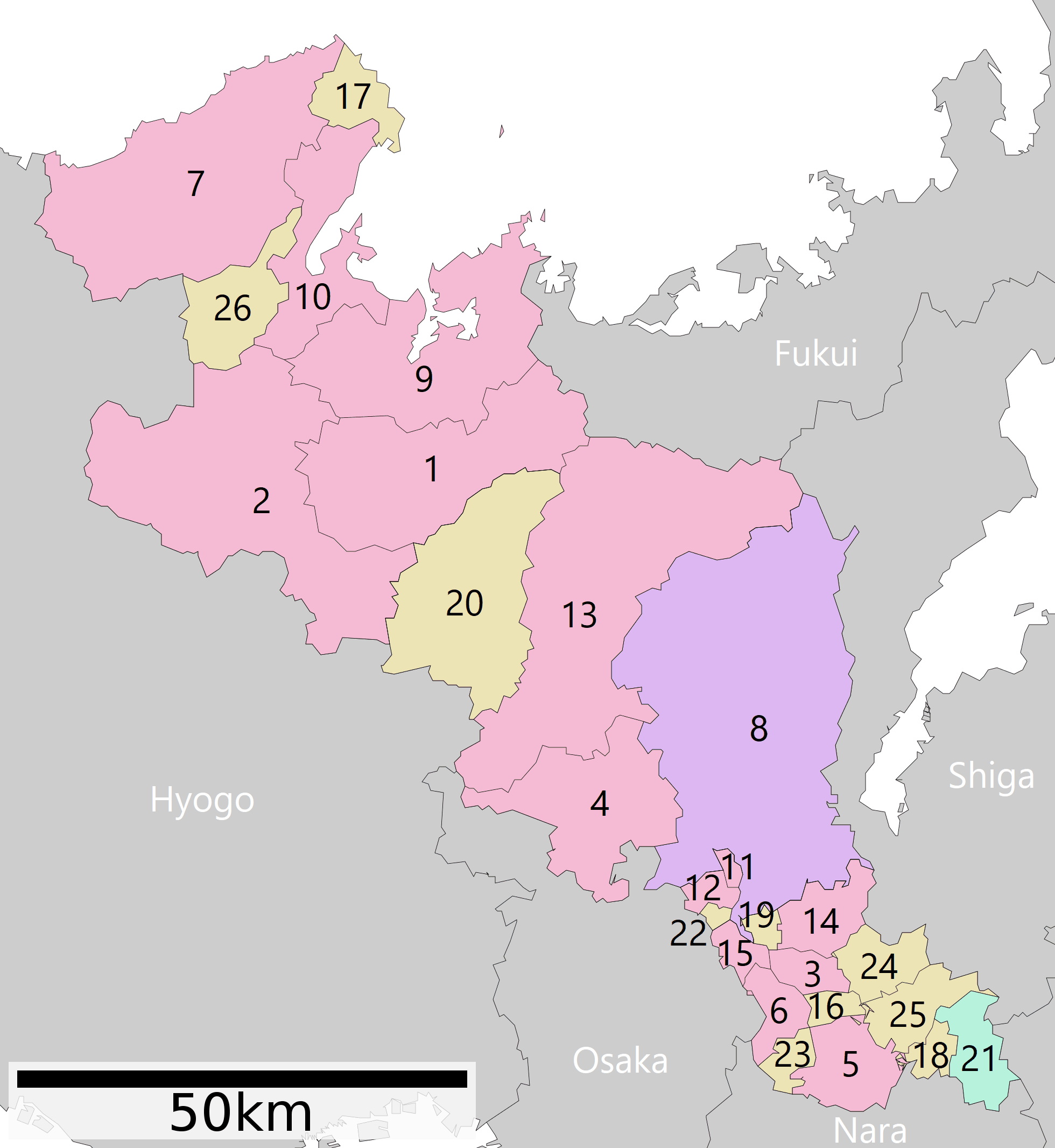
Map of Kyoto Prefecture Designated City City Town Village

Cities

Fifteen cities are located in Kyoto Prefecture:

Flag, name w/o suffix	Full name			Area (km^{2})	Population	Map
Flag, name w/o suffix	Japanese	Transcription	Translation	Area (km^{2})	Population	Map
Ayabe	綾部市	Ayabe-shi	Ayabe City	347.10	31,846	1
Fukuchiyama	福知山市	Fukuchiyama-shi	Fukuchiyama City	552.54	77,306	2
Jōyō	城陽市	Jōyō-shi	Jōyō City	32.71	74,607	3
Kameoka	亀岡市	Kameoka-shi	Kameoka City	224.80	86,174	4
Kizugawa	木津川市	Kizugawa-shi	Kizugawa City	85.13	77,907	5
Kyōtanabe	京田辺市	Kyōtanabe-shi	Kyōtanabe City	42.92	73,753	6
Kyōtango	京丹後市	Kyōtango-shi	Kyōtango City	501.44	50,860	7
Kyoto (capital)	京都市	Kyōto-shi	Kyoto City	827.83	1,463,723	8
Maizuru	舞鶴市	Maizuru-shi	Maizuru City	342.13	80,336	9
Miyazu	宮津市	Miyazu-shi	Miyazu City	172.74	16,758	10
Mukō	向日市	Mukō-shi	Mukō City	7.72	56,859	11
Nagaokakyō	長岡京市	Nagaokakyō-shi	Nagaokakyō City	19.17	80,608	12
Nantan	南丹市	Nantan-shi	Nantan City	616.40	31,629	13
Uji	宇治市	Uji-shi	Uji City	67.54	179,630	14
Yawata	八幡市	Yawata-shi	Yawata City	24.35	70,433	15

Kansai Science City is located in the southwest.

Towns and villages

These are the towns and villages in each district:

Flag, name w/o suffix	Full name			Area (km^{2})	Population	District	Map
Flag, name w/o suffix	Japanese	Transcription	Translation	Area (km^{2})	Population	District	Map
Ide	井手町	Ide-chō	Ide Town	18.04	7,406	Tsuzuki District	16
Ine	伊根町	Ine-chō	Ine Town	61.95	1,928	Yosa District	17
Kasagi	笠置町	Kasagi-chō	Kasagi Town	23.52	1,144	Sōraku District	18
Kumiyama	久御山町	Kumiyama-chō	Kumiyama Town	13.86	15,250	Kuse District	19
Kyōtamba	京丹波町	Kyōtamba-chō	Kyōtamba Town	303.09	12,907	Funai District	20
Minamiyamashiro	南山城村	Minamiyamashiro-mura	Minamiyamashiro Village	64.11	2,391	Sōraku District	21
Ōyamazaki	大山崎町	Ōyamazaki-chō	Ōyamazaki Town	5.97	15,953	Otokuni District	22
Seika	精華町	Seika-chō	Seika Town	25.68	36,198	Sōraku District	23
Ujitawara	宇治田原町	Ujitawara-chō	Ujitawara Town	58.16	8,911	Tsuzuki District	24
Wazuka	和束町	Wazuka-chō	Wazuka Town	64.93	3,478	Sōraku District	25
Yosano	与謝野町	Yosano-chō	Yosano Town	108.38	20,092	Yosa District	26

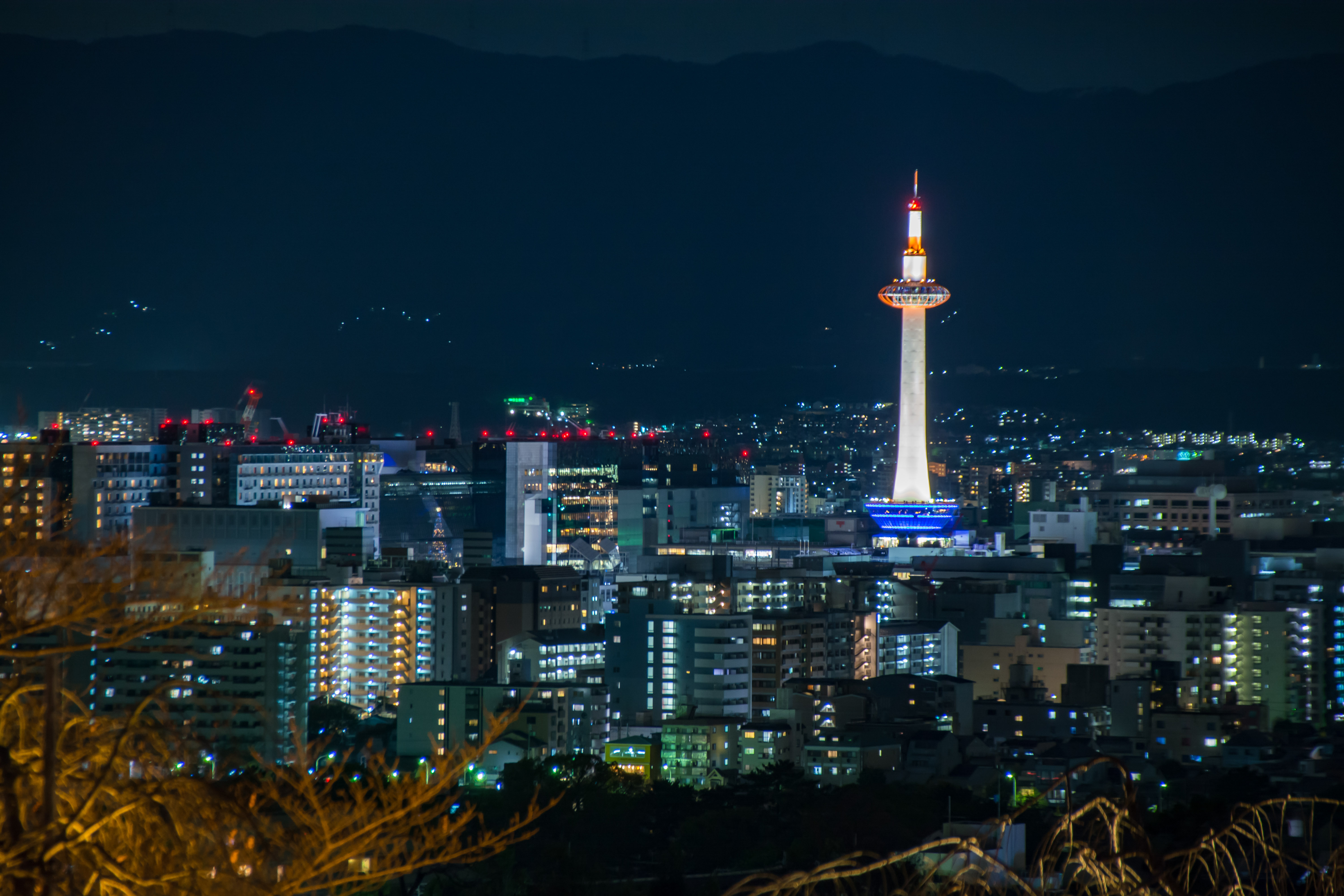
Kyoto City

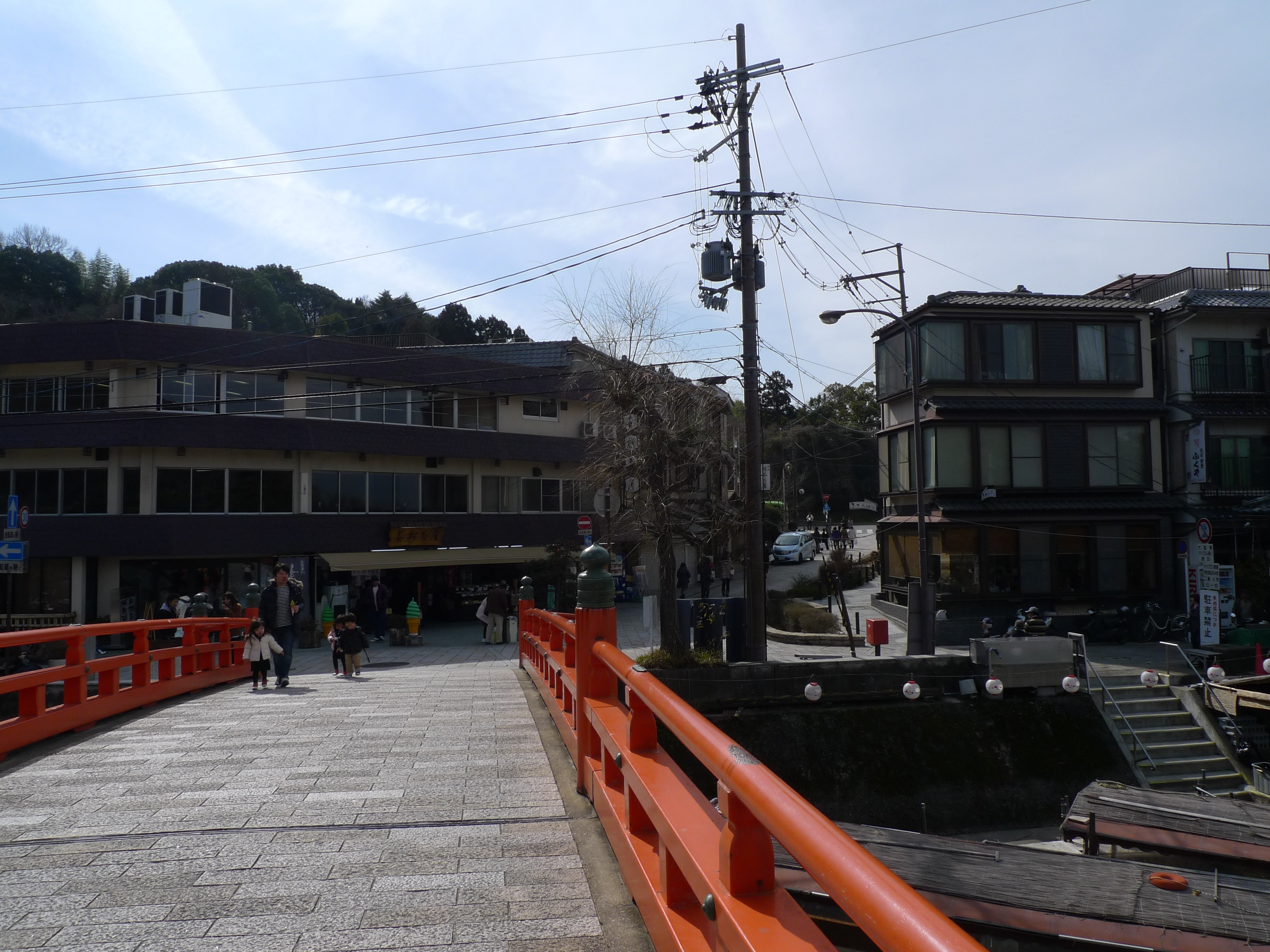
Uji City

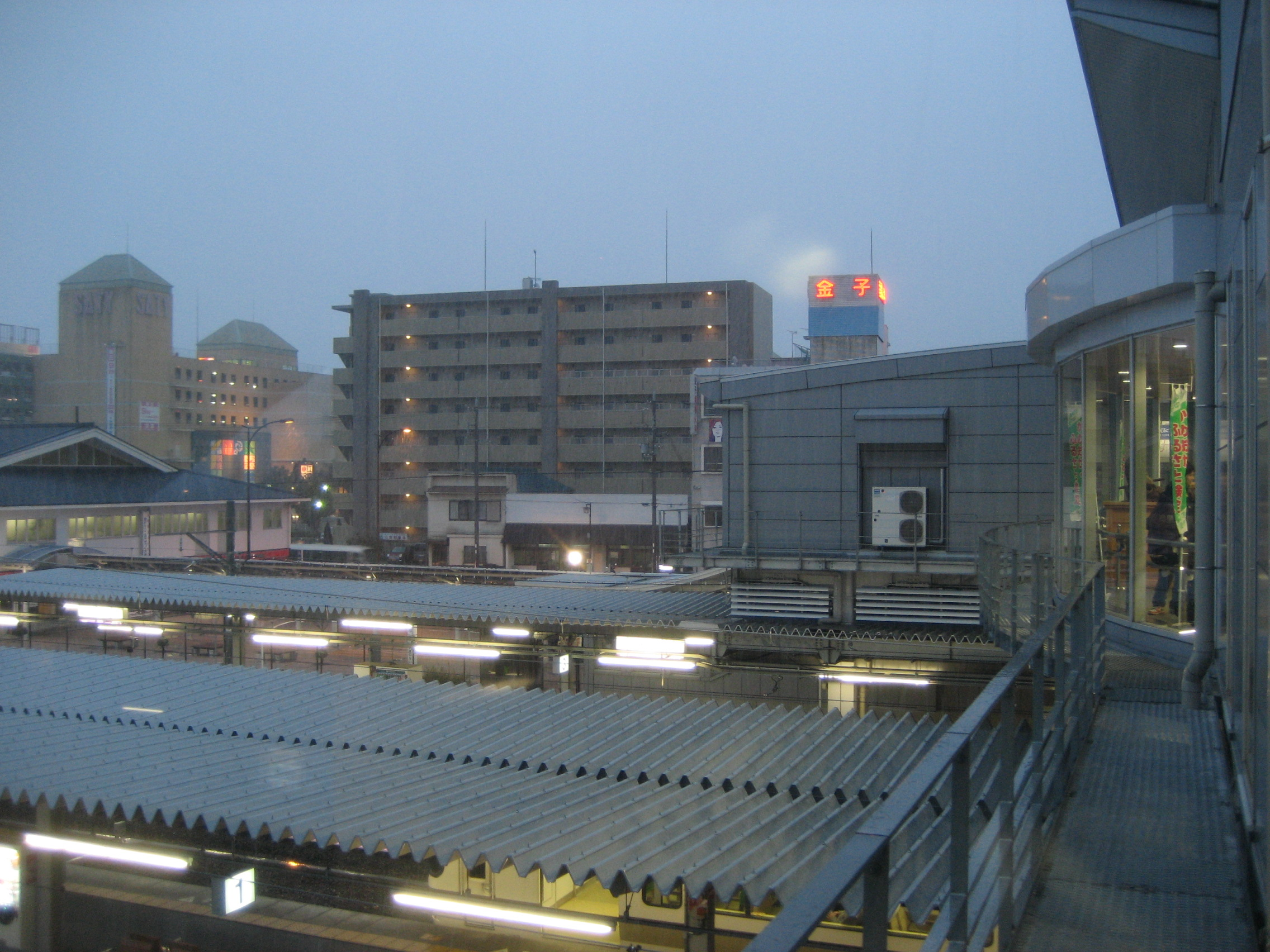
Kameoka City

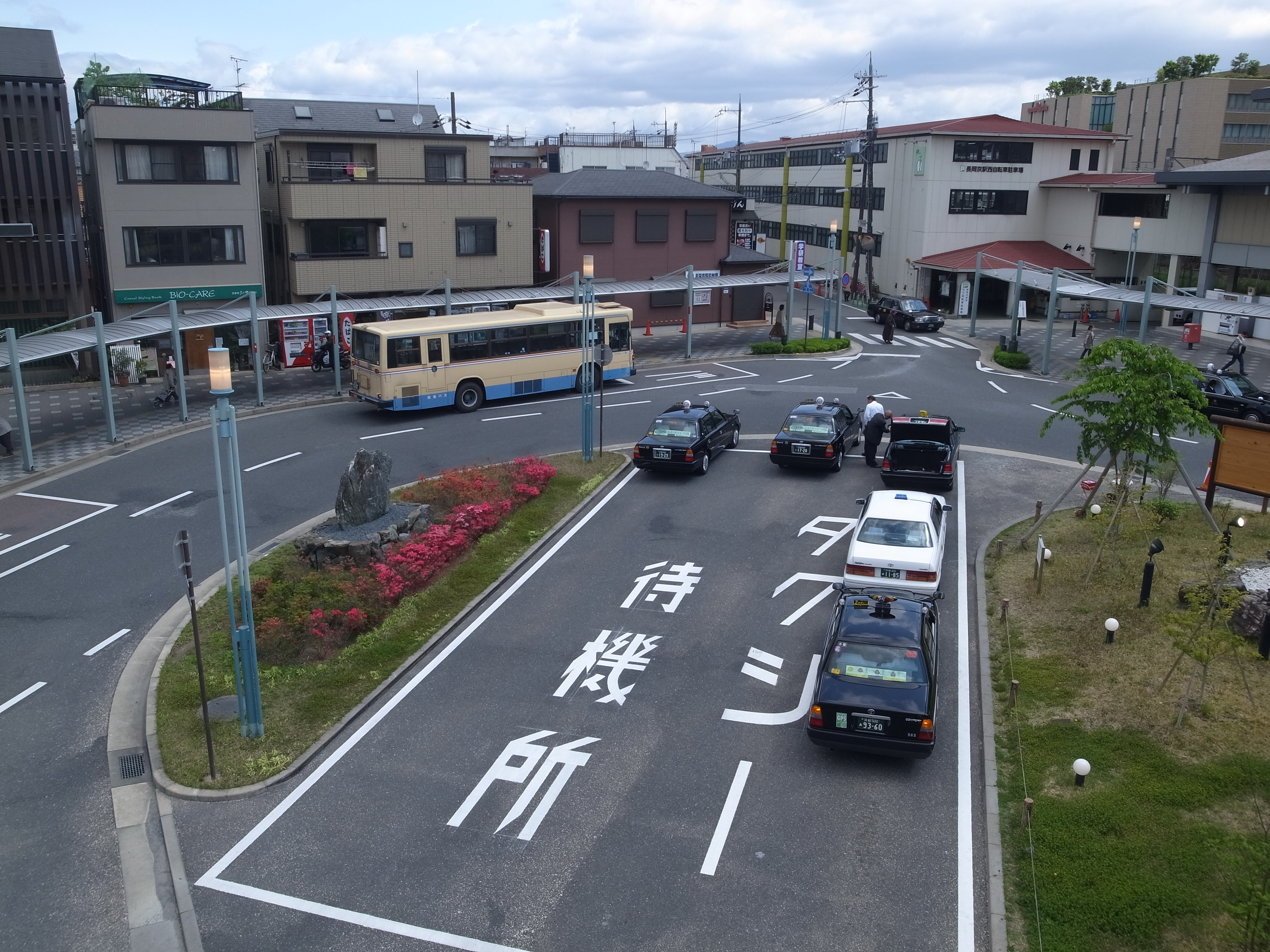
Nagaokakyō City

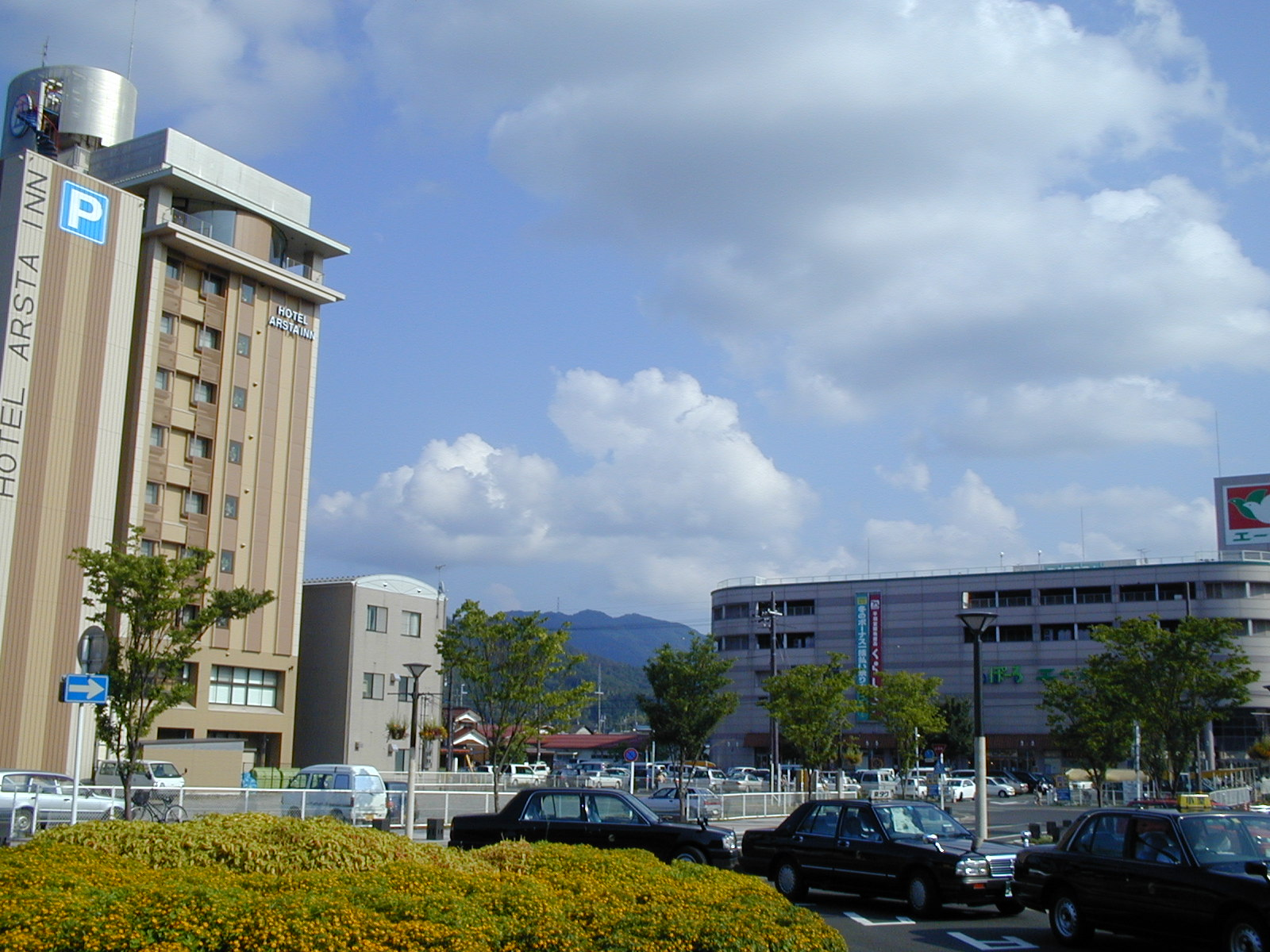
Maizuru City

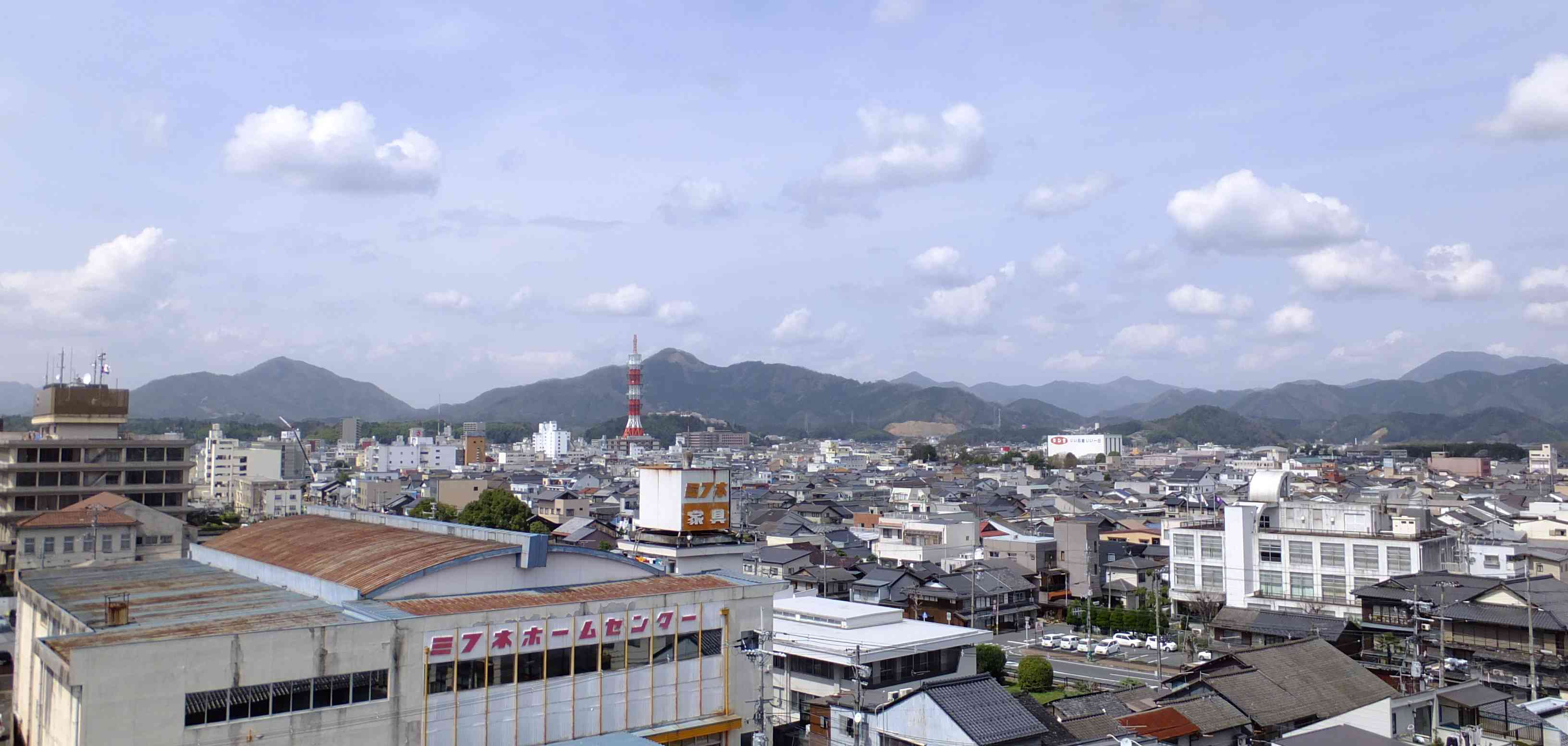
Fukuchiyama City

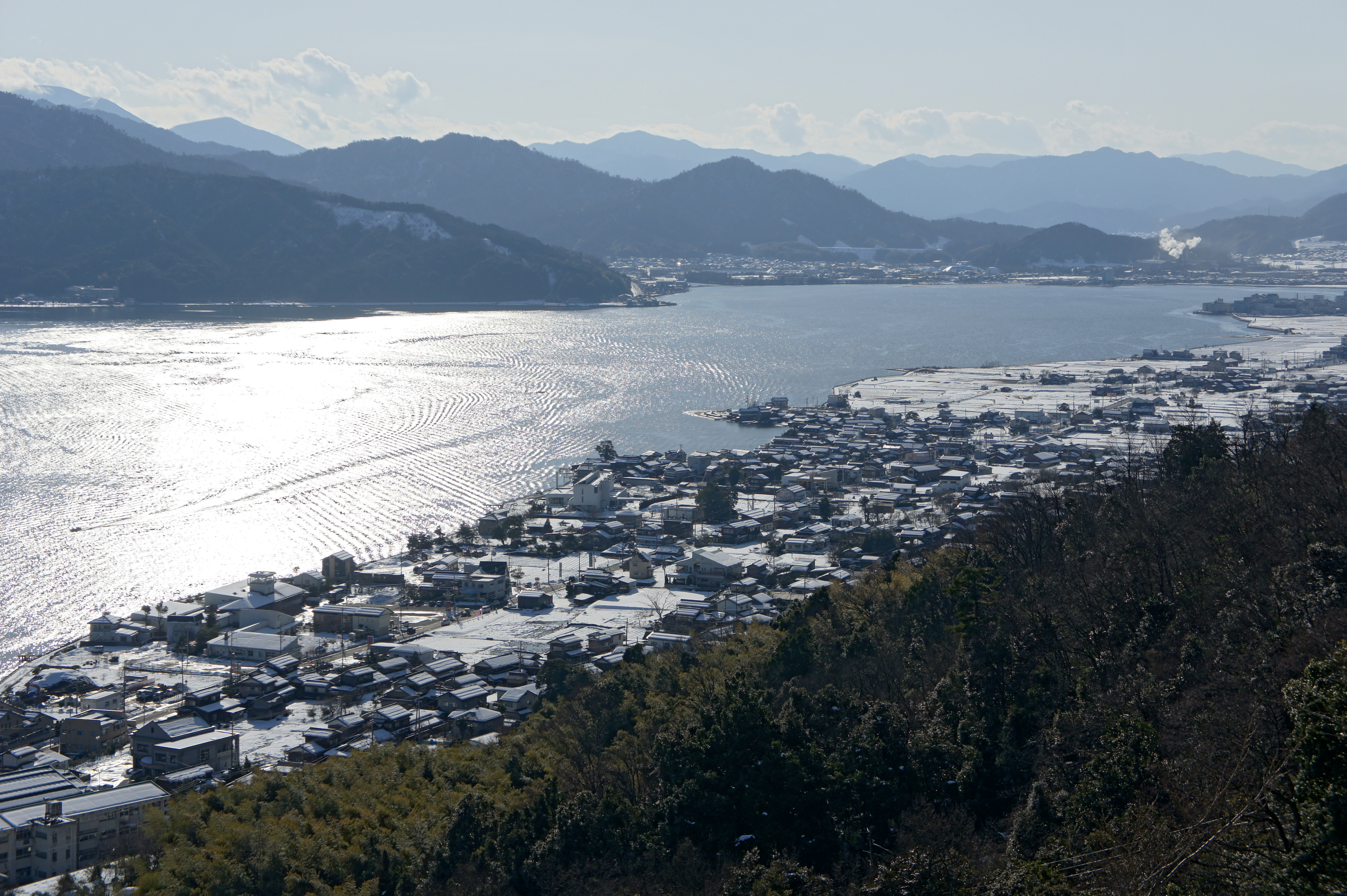
Miyazu City and Aso Bay

=== Demographics ===
Kyoto population pyramid in 2020

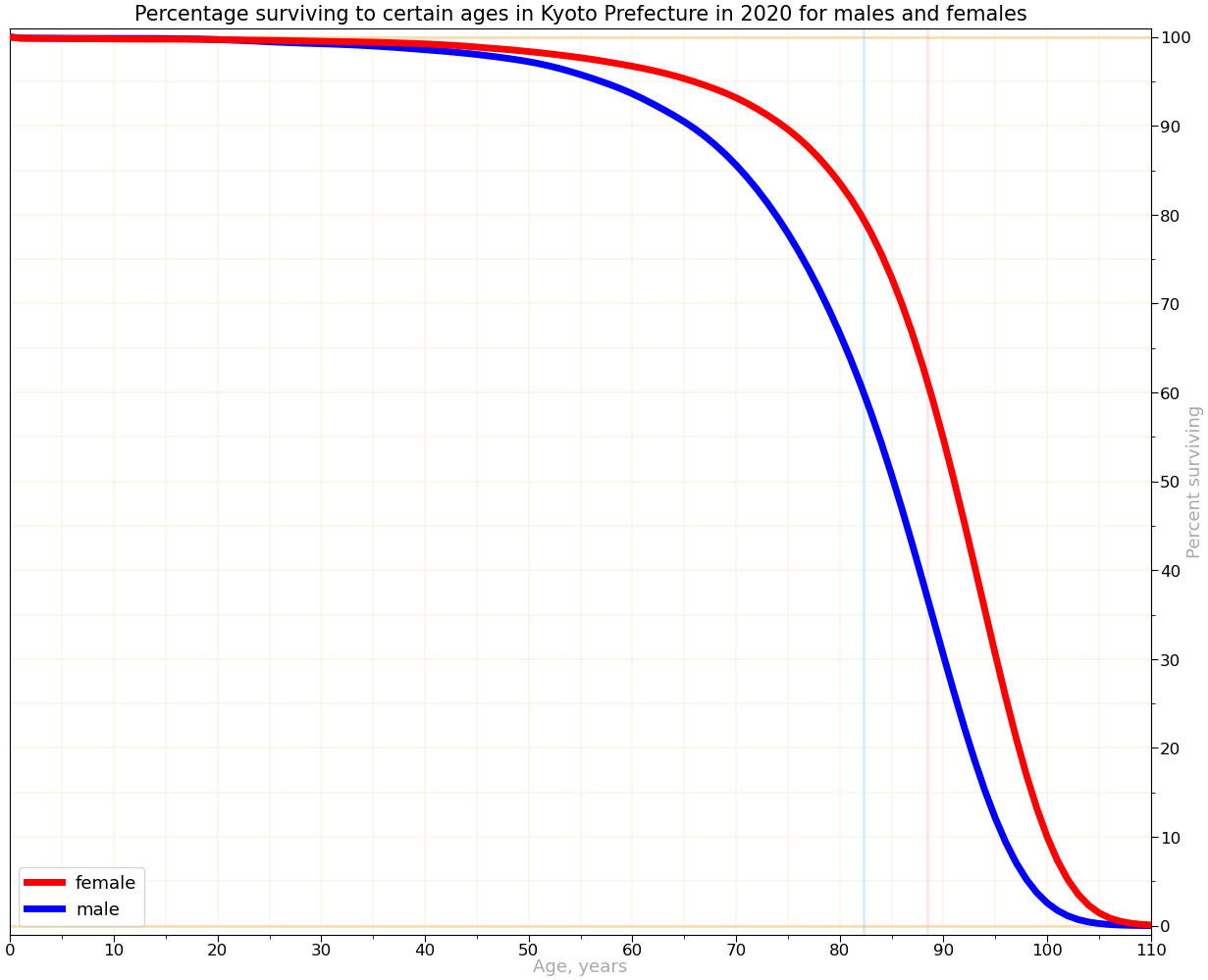
Kyoto Prefecture has one of the highest life expectancy in the country. In 2020 it was 85.54 years.

Historical population
Year	Pop.	±%
1885	846,761	—
1890	894,928	+5.7%
1900	1,022,695	+14.3%
1910	1,197,473	+17.1%
1920	1,287,147	+7.5%
1930	1,552,832	+20.6%
1940	1,729,993	+11.4%
1950	1,832,934	+6.0%
1960	1,993,403	+8.8%
1970	2,250,087	+12.9%
1980	2,527,330	+12.3%
1990	2,602,460	+3.0%
2000	2,644,391	+1.6%
2010	2,636,092	−0.3%
2020	2,578,087	−2.2%
Source: Statistics Division, Policy Planning Department, Kyoto Prefecture

=== Religion ===
According to Agency for Cultural Affairs research in 2020, over 60% believe in Shinto and Buddhism.

== Politics ==
The current governor of Kyoto is Takatoshi Nishiwaki, a former vice minister of the Reconstruction Agency. He was first elected in April 2018, and has since been re-elected twice.

The prefectural assembly has 60 members from 25 electoral districts and is still elected in unified local elections (last round: 2019). As of September 2020, it was composed as follows: Liberal Democratic Party 30, Japanese Communist Party 12, Democratic Party 11, Kōmeitō 5, Japan Restoration Party 2.

=== National representatives ===
Kyoto's delegation to the National Diet consists of six members of the House of Representatives and four members (two per election) of the House of Councillors. After the national elections of 2022, 2024 and 2025, the prefecture is represented by two LDPs, two CDPs, a Ishin, and an independent in the lower house, and two LDPs, one CDP and one Ishin in the upper house.

==== Representatives (lower house) ====
Constituency	Name	Party
Kyoto 1st	Yasushi Katsume	LDP
Kyoto 2nd	Seiji Maehara	Ishin
Kyoto 3rd	Kenta Izumi	CDP
Kyoto 4th	Keiro Kitagami	Independent
Kyoto 5th	Taro Honda	LDP
Kyoto 6th	Kazunori Yamanoi	CDP

==== Councillors (upper house) ====
Class	Name	Party
2022	Akira Yoshii	LDP
2022	Tetsuro Fukuyama	CDP
2025	Shohei Niimi	Ishin
2025	Shoji Nishida	LDP

=== Prefectural symbols ===
The prefectural flower of Kyoto is the weeping cherry. The Kitayama Sugi is the official tree, and the streaked shearwater the bird that symbolizes the prefecture.

== Defense facilities ==
It will be co-located with a JASDF facility already based in the city. At least initially, its primary sensor will be a mobile X-band radar used to gather data on ballistic missile launches which will then be relayed by the station to warships equipped with Aegis air defense systems and to ground-based interceptor missile sites. A hundred and sixty personnel will be based at the station.

== Economy ==
GDP (PPP) per capita
Year	US$
1975	4,746
1980	8,375
1985	12,799
1990	18,128
1995	21,190
2000	24,692
2005	29,256
2010	33,058
2015	38,567

Kyoto prefecture's economy is supported by industries that create value that is unique to Kyoto, such as the tourism and traditional industries supported by 1,200 years of history and culture, as well as high-technology industries that combine the technology of Kyoto's traditional industries with new ideas.

Northern Kyoto on the Tango Peninsula has fishing and water transportation, and midland Kyoto has agriculture and forestry. The prefecture produces 13% of the domestic sake and green tea. Japan's largest vertical farm is located in the prefecture.

The Kyoto-based manufacturing industry holds shares of Japan's high-technology product markets and others. As of 2021, eight Forbes Global 2000 companies were located in Kyoto prefecture: Nintendo, Nidec, Kyocera, Murata Manufacturing, Omron, Rohm, Bank of Kyoto, SCREEN Holdings. Takara Holdings, GS Yuasa, Mitsubishi Logisnext, Maxell, and Kyoto Animation are also based in the prefecture.

As of October 2021, the minimum wage in the prefecture was ¥937 per hour.

== Education ==
=== Colleges and universities ===
- Bukkyo University
- Doshisha University
- Doshisha Women's College of Liberal Arts
- Doshisha Women's Junior College
- Hanazono University
- Heian Jogakuin University
- Ikenobo College
- Kacho College
- Kyoto Bunkyo University
- Kyoto Bunkyo Junior College
- Kyoto City University of Arts
- Kyoto College of Economics
- Kyoto College of Graduate Studies for Informatics
- Kyoto College of Medical Science
- Kyoto College of Nursing
- Kyoto Institute of Technology
- Kyoto Junior College of Foreign Languages
- Kyoto Kacho University
- Kyoto Koka Women's University
- Kyoto Koka Women's College
- Kyoto Notre Dame University
- Kyoto Pharmaceutical University
- Kyoto Prefectural University
- Kyoto Prefectural University of Medicine
- Kyoto Saga Art College
- Kyoto Saga University of Arts
- Kyoto Sangyo University
- Kyoto Seika University
- Kyoto Seizan College
- Kyoto Tachibana University
- Kyoto University
- Kyoto University of Advanced Science
- Kyoto University of the Arts
- Kyoto Arts and Crafts University
- Kyoto University of Education
- Kyoto University of Foreign Studies
- Kyoto Women's University
- Meiji University of Integrative Medicine
- Ōtani University
- Otani University Junior College
- Ritsumeikan University
- Ryukoku University
- Ryukoku University Faculty of Junior College
- Shuchiin University
- Temple University, Japan Campus Kyoto
- University of Fukuchiyama

=== Primary schools ===
- Kyoto Municipal Shimogyo Shousei Elementary School
- Kyoto Municipal Suzakudaiyon Elementary School
- Kyoto Municipal Ansyu Elementary School
- Kyoto Municipal Umedukita Elementary School
- Kyoto Municipal Kamigamo Primary School
- Kyoto Municipal Kenryu Primary School
- Kyoto Municipal Shogaku Elementary School

=== Primary/secondary schools ===
- Toei Gakuen Ittoen Elementary, Junior and Senior High School

=== Secondary schools ===
- Heian Jogakuin (St. Agnes) Junior and Senior High School

=== Upper secondary schools ===
- Kyoto Prefectural Toba High School
- St. Joseph Gakuen Nissei High School
- Kyoto Gaidai Nishi High School
- Kyoto Municipal Murasakino Senior High School
- Kyoto Prefectural Sagano High School
- Kyoto Prefectural Nishiotokuni Senior High School

== Transportation ==
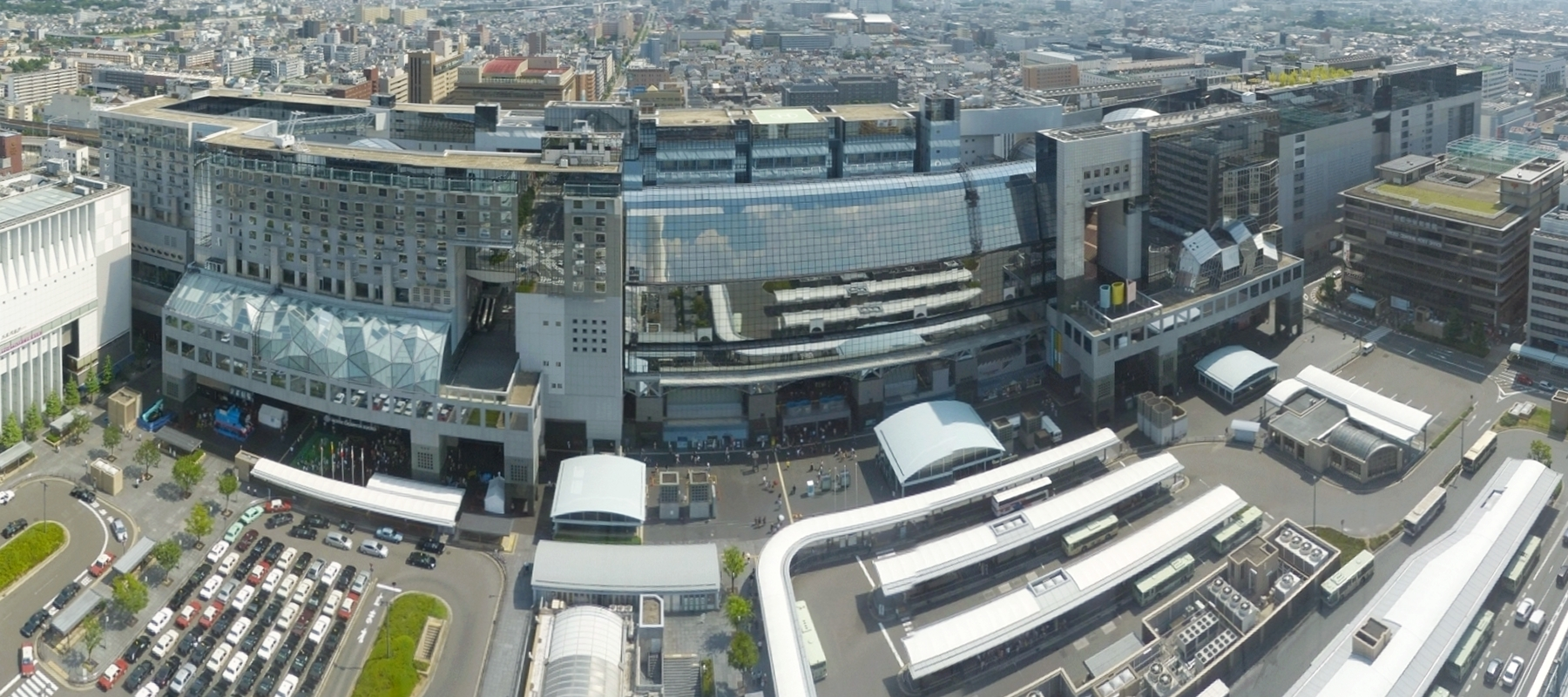
Kyoto Station

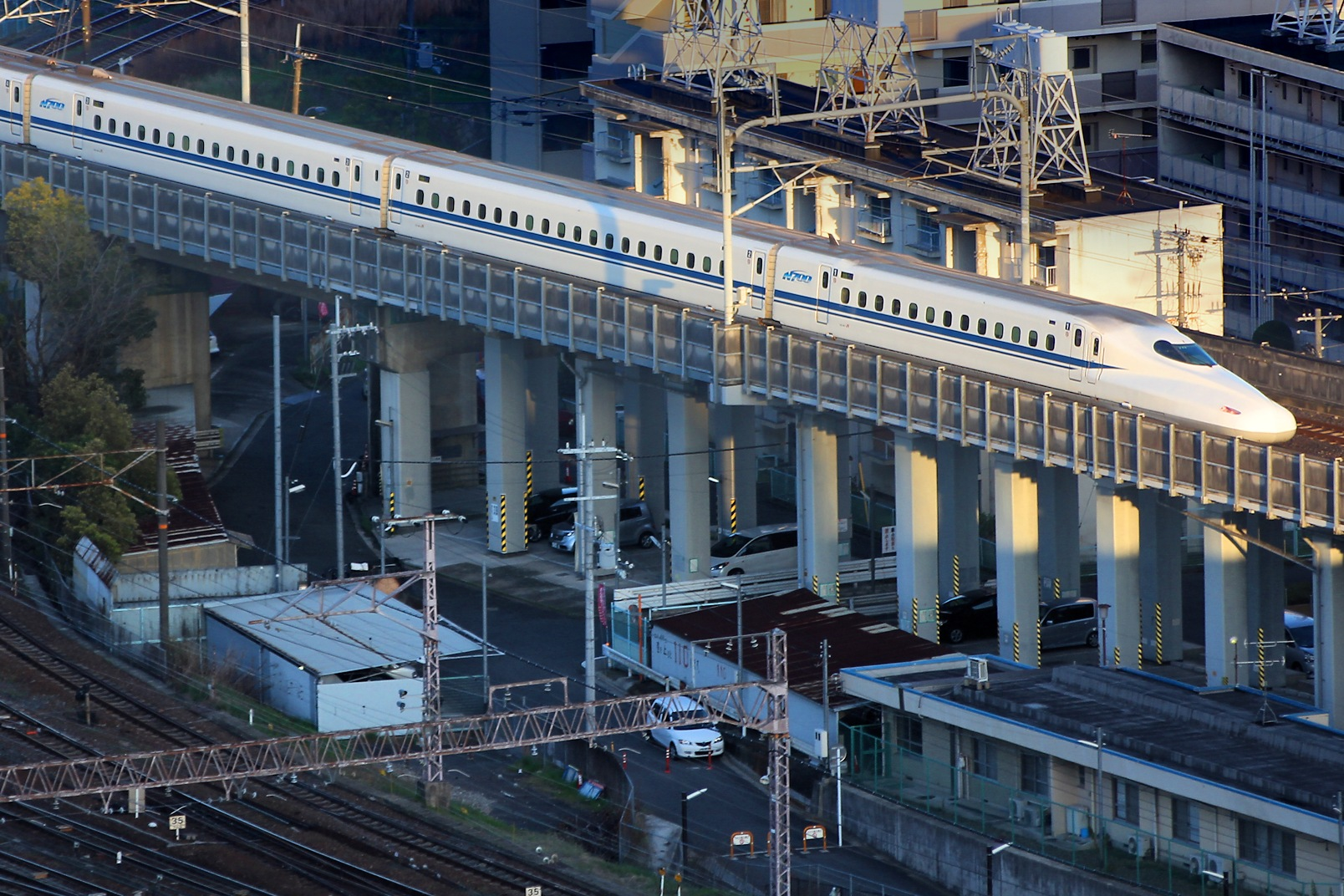
Tōkaidō Shinkansen arriving at Kyoto Station

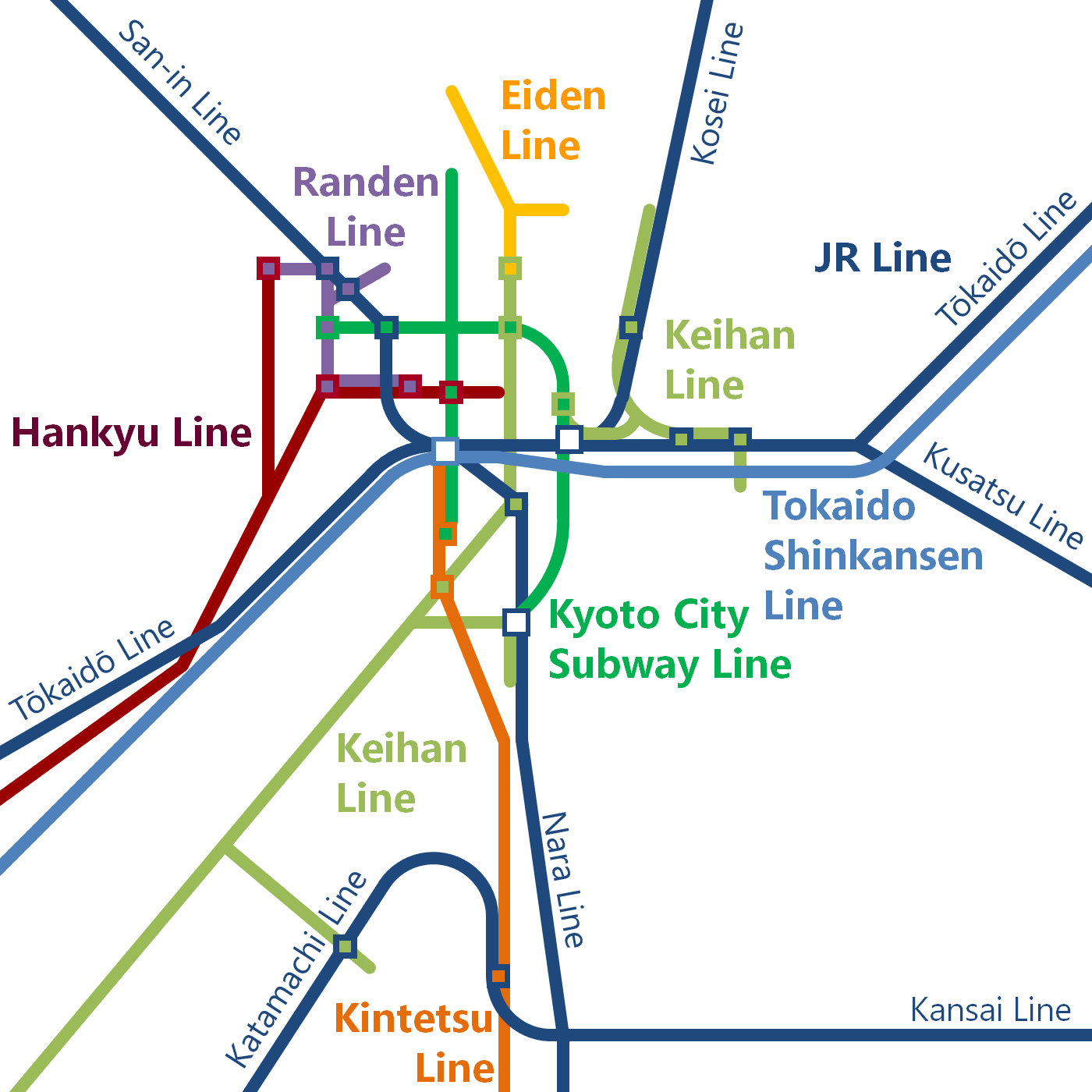
Railway map around southern Kyoto Prefecture.

=== Railways ===
- JR Central
  - Tōkaidō Shinkansen—Kyōto Station
- JR West
  - Kyoto Line
  - Biwako Line
  - Kosei Line
  - Nara Line
  - Kansai Line (Kizu-Kamo)
  - Sagano Line
  - Sanin Line
  - Fukuchiyama Line
  - Maizuru Line
  - Obama Line
- Keihan
  - Keihan Line
  - Uji Line
  - Keishin Line
  - Outou Line
- Hankyu
  - Kyoto Line
  - Arashiyama Line
- Kintetsu
  - Kyoto Line
- Kyoto Municipal Subway
  - Karasuma Line
  - Tōzai Line
- Sagano Scenic Railway (Arashiyama-Kameoka)
- Kyoto Tango Railway
  - Miyafuku Line
  - Miyamai Line
  - Miyatoyo Line

=== City tram ===
- Eiden
  - Eizan Line
  - Kurama Line
- Randen
  - Arashiyama Line
  - Kitano Line

=== Seaports ===
- Maizuru Port - Mainly international container terminal and ferry route to Hokkaido (Otaru and Tomakomai).

=== Roads ===
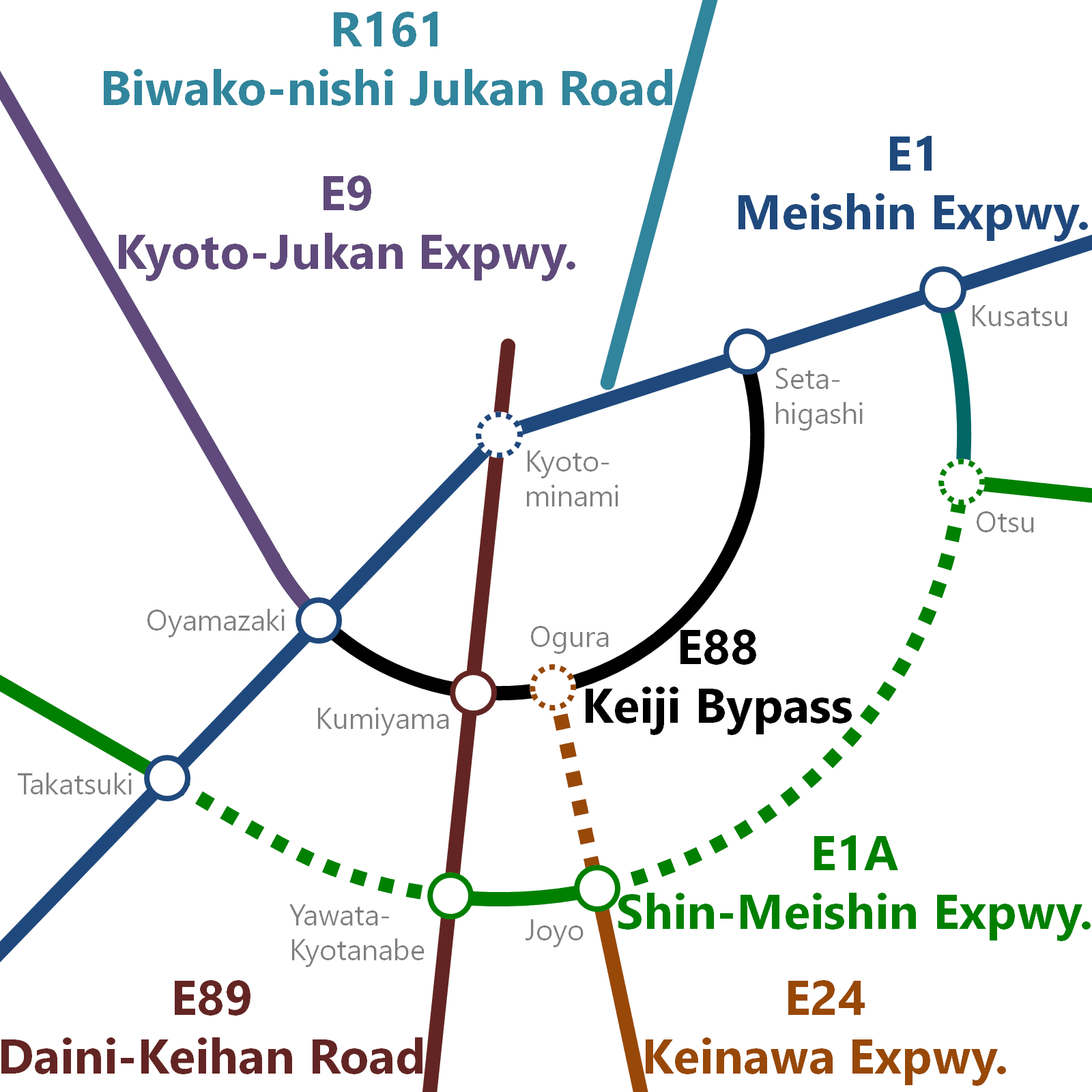
Expressway map around southern Kyoto Prefecture. Roads and junctions under planning are shown by dotted lines.

==== Expressways ====
- Keiji(Kyoto-Shiga) Bypass
- Keinawa(Kyoto-Nara-Wakayama) Expressway
- Kyoto-Jukan Expressway
- Maizuru Wakasa Expressway
- Meishin Expressway
- San'in Kinki Expressway
- Second Keihan Highway (Daini-Keihan Road)
- Shin-Meishin Expressway

==== National highways ====
- Route 1 (Route 8)
- Route 9 (Kyoto-Fukuchiyama-Tottori-Yonago-Izumo-Hamada-Yamaguchi)
- Route 24 (Kyoto-Nara-Kashihara-Hashimoto-Wakayama)
- Route 27 (Tanba-Maizuru-Tsuruga)
- Route 162
- Route 163
- Route 171 (Kyoto-Takatsuki-Minoo-Itami-Nishinomiya)
- Route 173
- Route 175 (Akashi-Nishiwaki-Fukuchiyama-Maizuru)
- Route 176 (Osaka-Sanda-Sasayama-Fukuchiyama-Miyazu)
- Route 178
- Route 307
- Route 312
- Route 372 (Kameoka-Sasayama-Kasai-Himeji)
- Route 423
- Route 426
- Route 429
- Route 477
- Route 478

== Culture ==
Kyoto has been, and still remains, Japan's cultural center. For over 1000 years it was Japan's capital. When the capital was changed to Tokyo, Kyoto remained Japan's cultural capital. The local government proposes a plan to move the Agency for Cultural Affairs to Kyoto and to regard Tokyo as the capital of politics and economy and Kyoto as the capital of culture. See Culture of Japan.

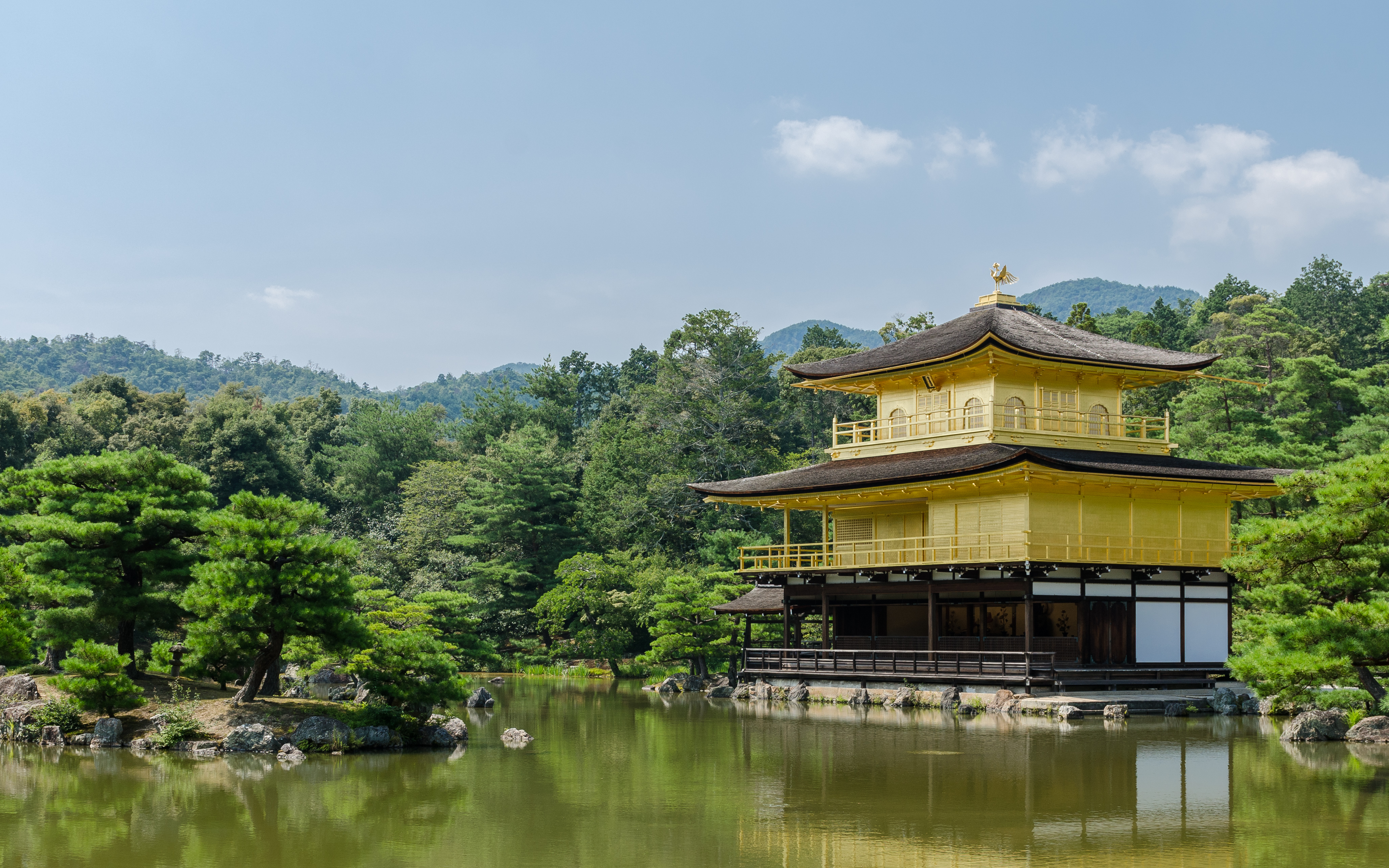
Kinkaku-ji

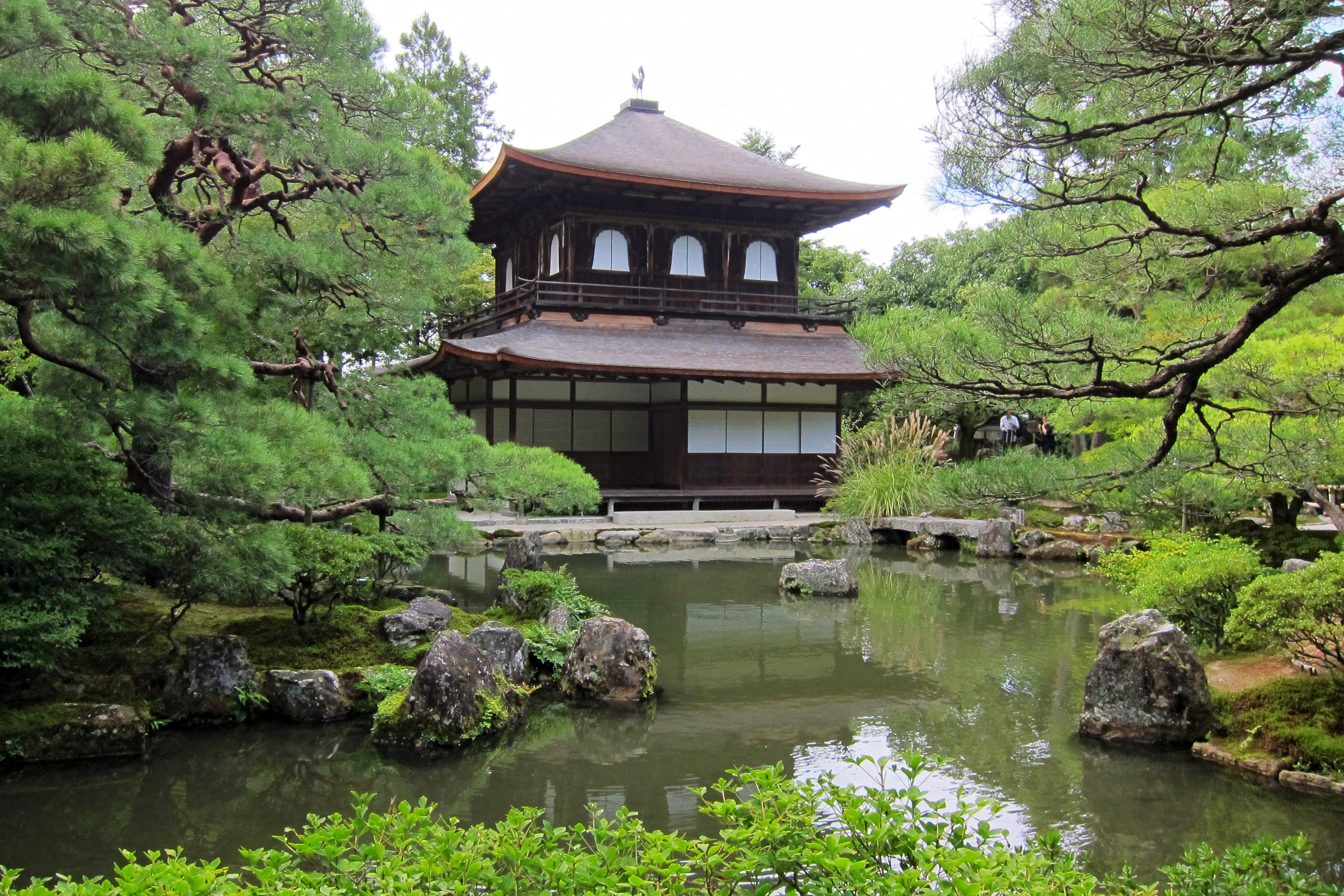
Ginkaku-ji

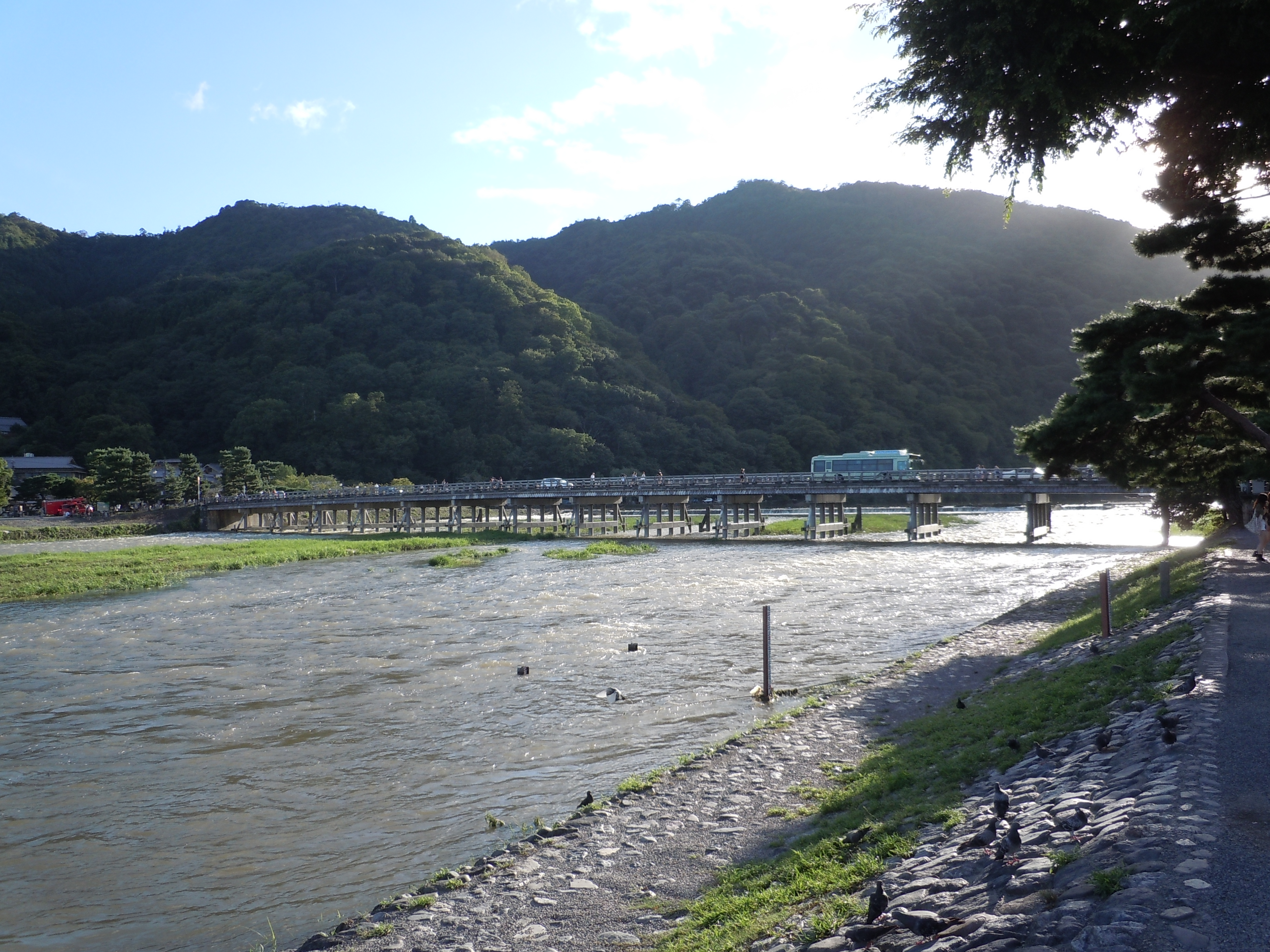
Togetsu Bridge in Arashiyama

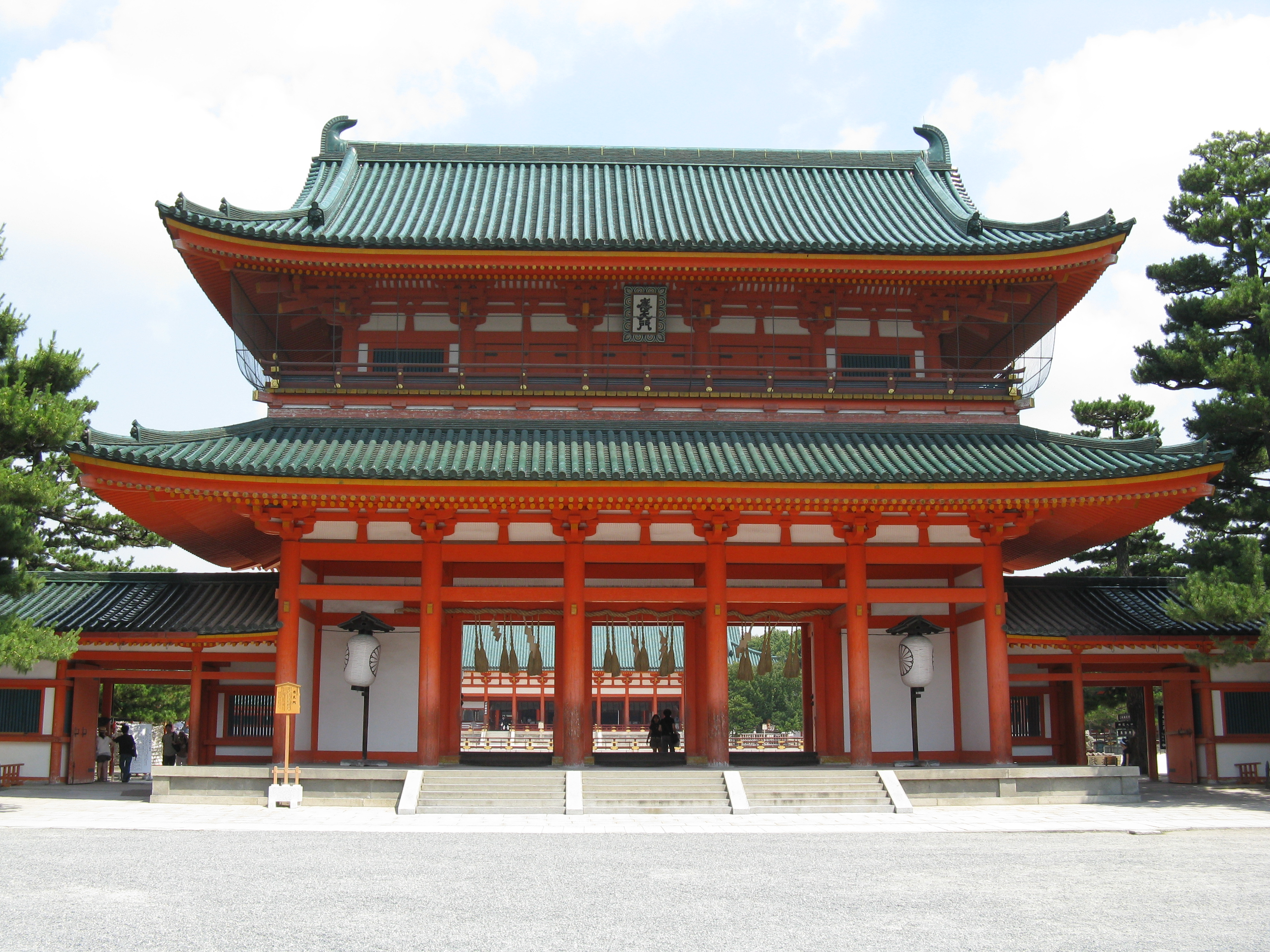
Heian Shrine

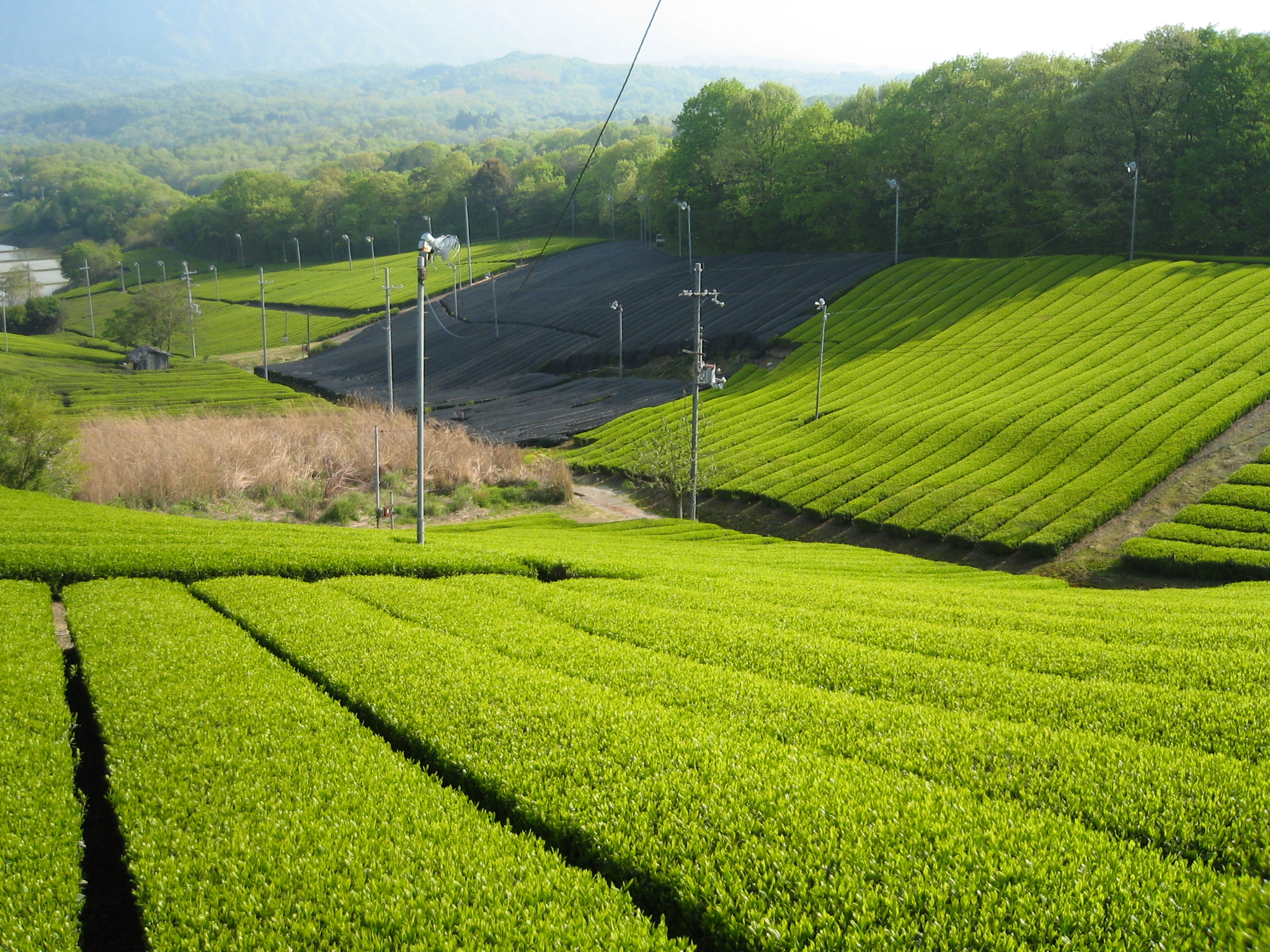
Japanese tea plantation

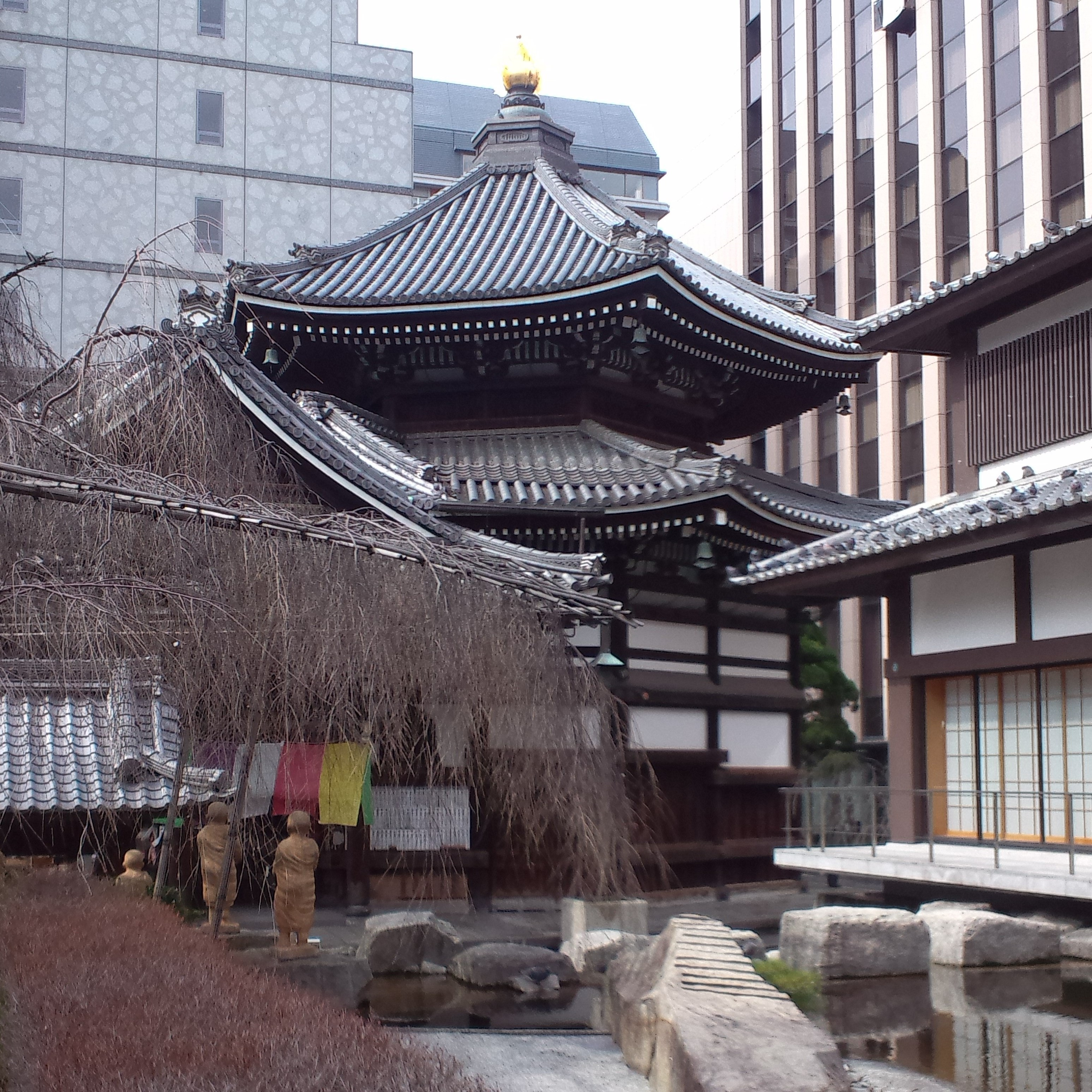
Rokkaku-dō, where a school of the Japanese flower arrangement originated from.

== Sports ==
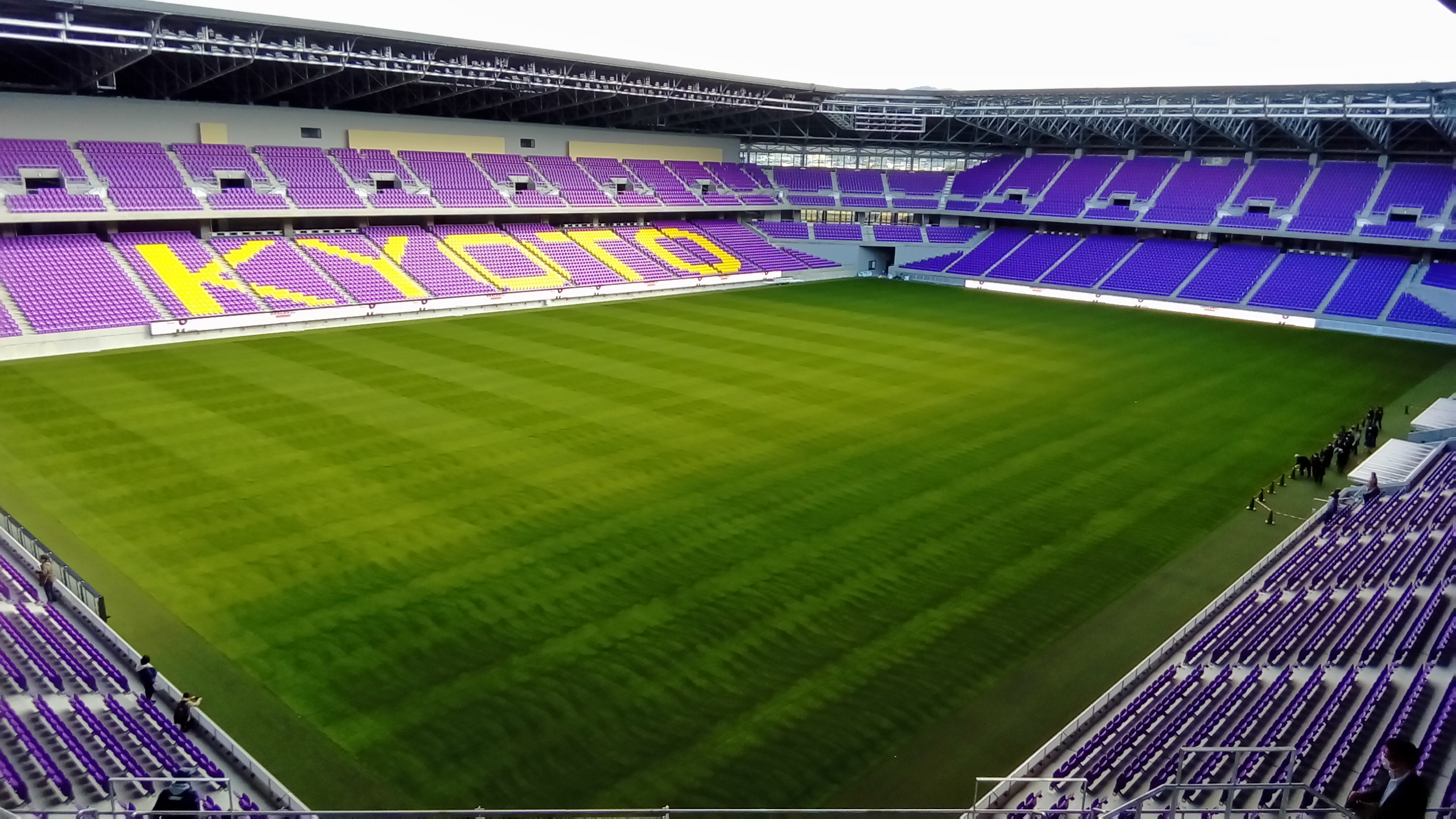
Sanga Stadium by Kyocera

The sports teams listed below are based in Kyoto.

Football (soccer)
- Kyoto Sanga F.C. (J1 League)
- Ococias Kyoto AC (Kansai Soccer League)
- AS. Laranja Kyoto (Kansai Soccer League)
Basketball
- Kyoto Hannaryz (B.League)
Rugby
- Mitsubishi Motors Kyoto Red Evolutions (Top West)
- Shimadzu Breakers (Top West)
- Unitika Phoenix (Top West)

== Tourism ==
Kyoto City is one of the most popular tourist spots in Japan, visited by many people across the world. Along with Tokyo, Kyoto is a common location for the graduation trip of Junior High and High schools.

Some of the festivals held in Kyoto are Aoi Matsuri from 544, Gion Matsuri from 869, Ine Matsuri from the Edo-era, Daimonji Gozan Okuribi from 1662, and Jidai Matsuri from 1895. Every shrine and temple holds some sort of event, and many of them are open for public viewing.

== International relations ==
Kyoto Prefecture has sister relationships with these places:

- Edinburgh, Scotland
- Leningrad Oblast, Russia
- Occitanie, France
- Oklahoma, United States
- Shaanxi Province, China
- Tuscany, Italy
- Quebec, Canada
- Special Region of Yogyakarta, Indonesia

These relationships are distinct from those of cities in Kyoto Prefecture with other cities.
