= Kyoto Sosei University =

Coordinates: 35°17′3.6″N 135°7′42.2″E

Kyoto Sosei University (京都創成大学, Kyoto sōsei daigaku) was a private university in Fukuchiyama, Kyoto, Japan. The predecessor of the school was founded in 1871, and it was chartered as a university in 2000.

It was changed to Seibi University in 2010.
