= Seibi University Junior College =

Discontinued collage in Fukuchiyama, Kyoto, Japan

Coordinates: 35°17′5.28″N 135°7′42.42″E

Seibi University Junior College (成美大学短期大学部, Seibi Daigaku Tanki Daigaku-bu, lit. "Seibi University Junior College Department") was a two-year college located in Fukuchiyama, Kyoto, Japan. Discontinued in 2017.

Seibi University Junior College is a part of the Seibi Gakuen school system which also includes Seibi High School and Seibi University. The college offers hospitality and nutrition courses.
