= Kyoto Bunkyo University =

Private university in Uji, Kyoto, Japan

- 京都文教大学
- Type: Private
- Established: 1904 (predecessor); 1996 (four-year college)
- Location: Uji, Kyoto Prefecture, Japan; 34°54′49.9″N 135°47′4.2″E
- Website: Kyoto Bunkyo University

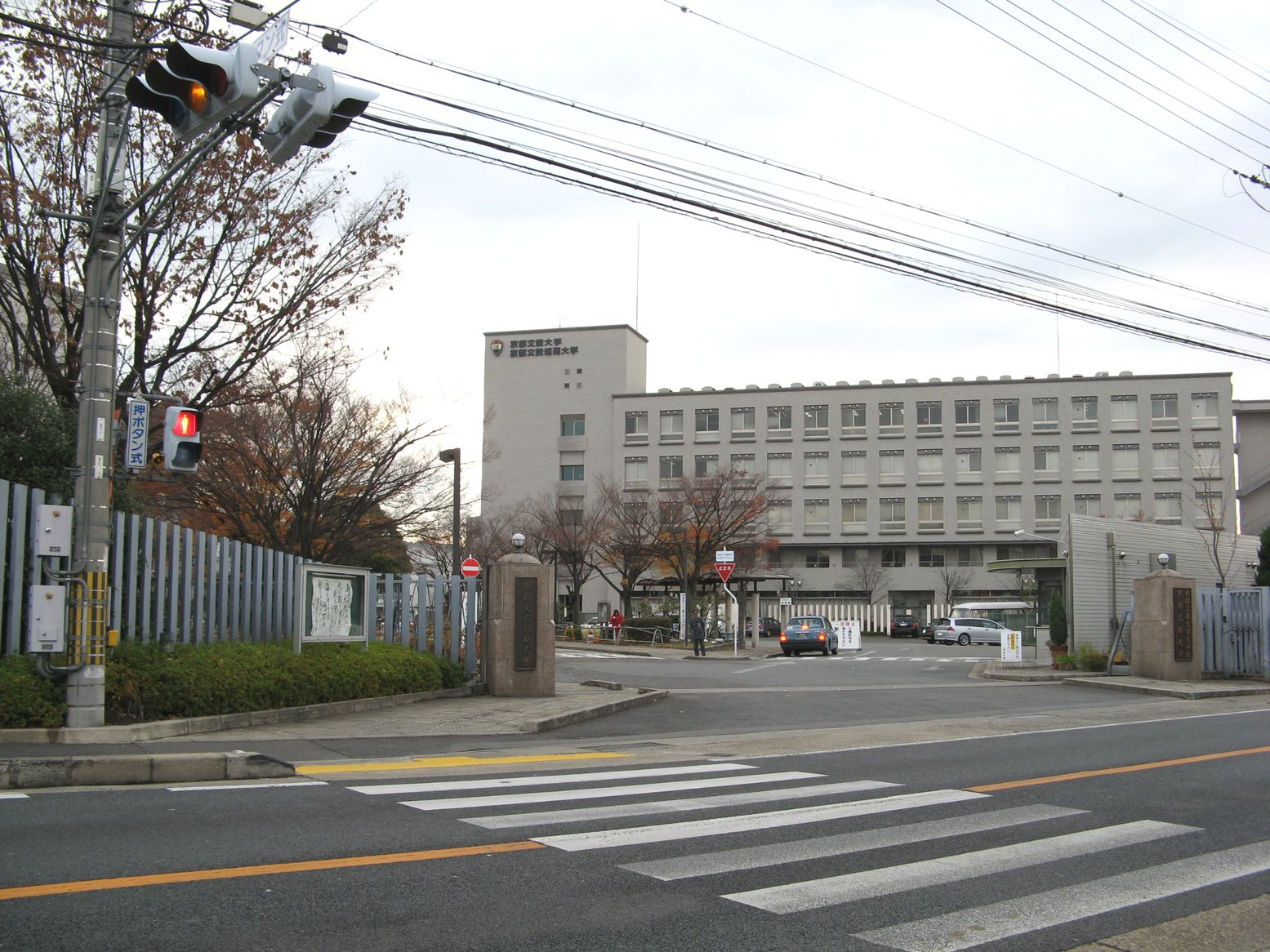
Kyoto Bunkyo University

Kyoto Bunkyo University (京都文教大学, Kyōto bunkyō daigaku) is a private university in Uji, Kyoto, Japan. The school's predecessor was founded in 1904. It was chartered as a junior college in 1960 and became a four-year college in 1996.
