= Hozukyō Prefectural Natural Park =

Natural park in Kyōto Prefecture, Japan

- 府立保津峡自然公園
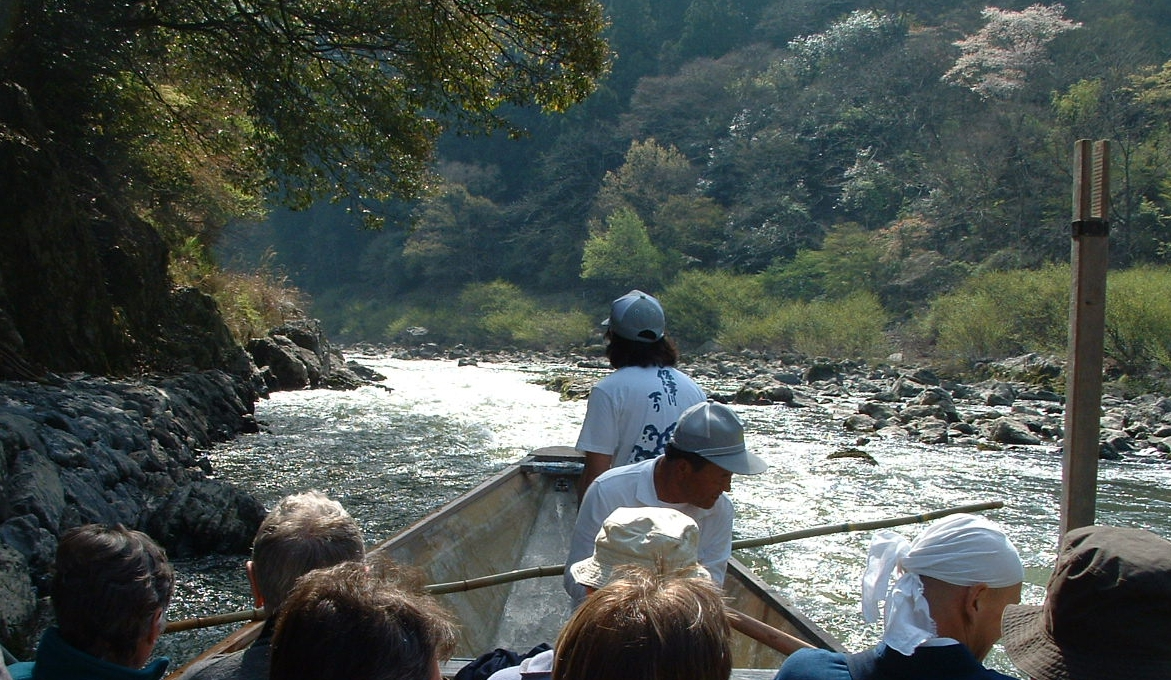
- Hozu River

- Location within Kyoto Prefecture Location within Japan
- Location: Kyōto Prefecture, Japan
- Coordinates: 35.02°N 135.6389°E
- Area: 0.71 km^{2} (0.27 sq mi)

Hozukyō Prefectural Natural Park (府立保津峡自然公園, Furitsu Hozukyō shizen kōen) is a Prefectural Natural Park in central Kyōto Prefecture, Japan. The park flanks the Hozu River within the municipalities of Kameoka and Kyoto (Ukyō-ku).

== See also ==
- National Parks of Japan
