= Kyoto Seizan College =

Coordinates: 34°56′15.7″N 135°40′34.9″E

Kyoto Seizan College (京都西山短期大学, Kyōto seizan tanki daigaku) is a private junior college in Nagaokakyo, Kyoto, Japan, established in 1950. The present name was adopted in 2004. Its philosophy is based on Jōdo-shū Seizan-ha Buddhism.
