= Kyoto Bunkyo Junior College =

Private junior college in Uji, Kyoto, Japan

Coordinates: 34°54′53.2″N 135°47′0.6″E

Kyoto Bunkyo Junior College (京都文教短期大学, Kyōto bunkyō tanki daigaku) is a private junior college in Uji, Kyoto, Japan, established in 1960.
