= Kyoto College of Economics =

Private junior college in Kyoto, Japan

Coordinates: 34°58′15.9″N 135°40′45.9″E

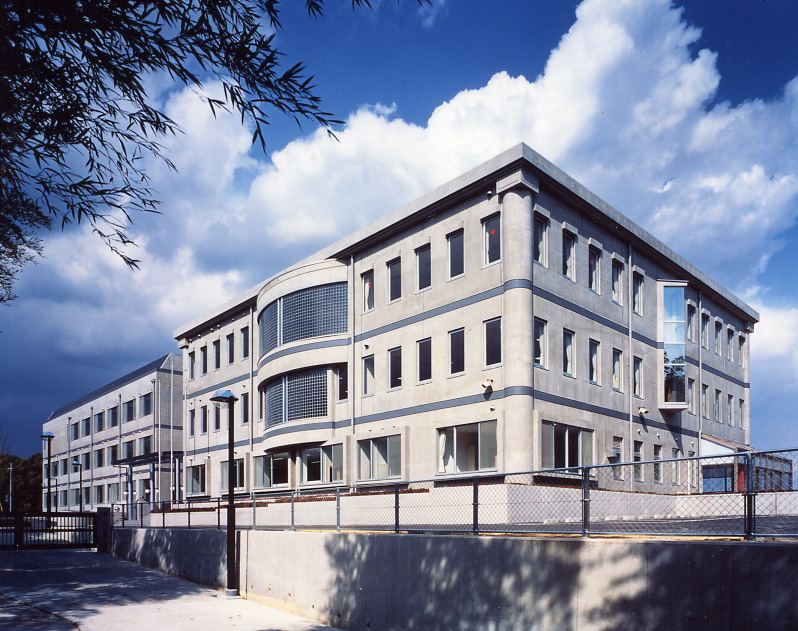
Kyoto College of Economics in Kyoto, Kyoto prefecture, Japan.

Kyoto College of Economics (京都経済短期大学, Kyōto keizai tanki daigaku) is a private junior college in Kyoto, Kyoto, Japan, established in 1993. The predecessor of the school was founded in 1907.
