= University of Fukuchiyama =

Coordinates: 35°17′3.6″N 135°7′42.2″E

The University of Fukuchiyama
- 福知山公立大学
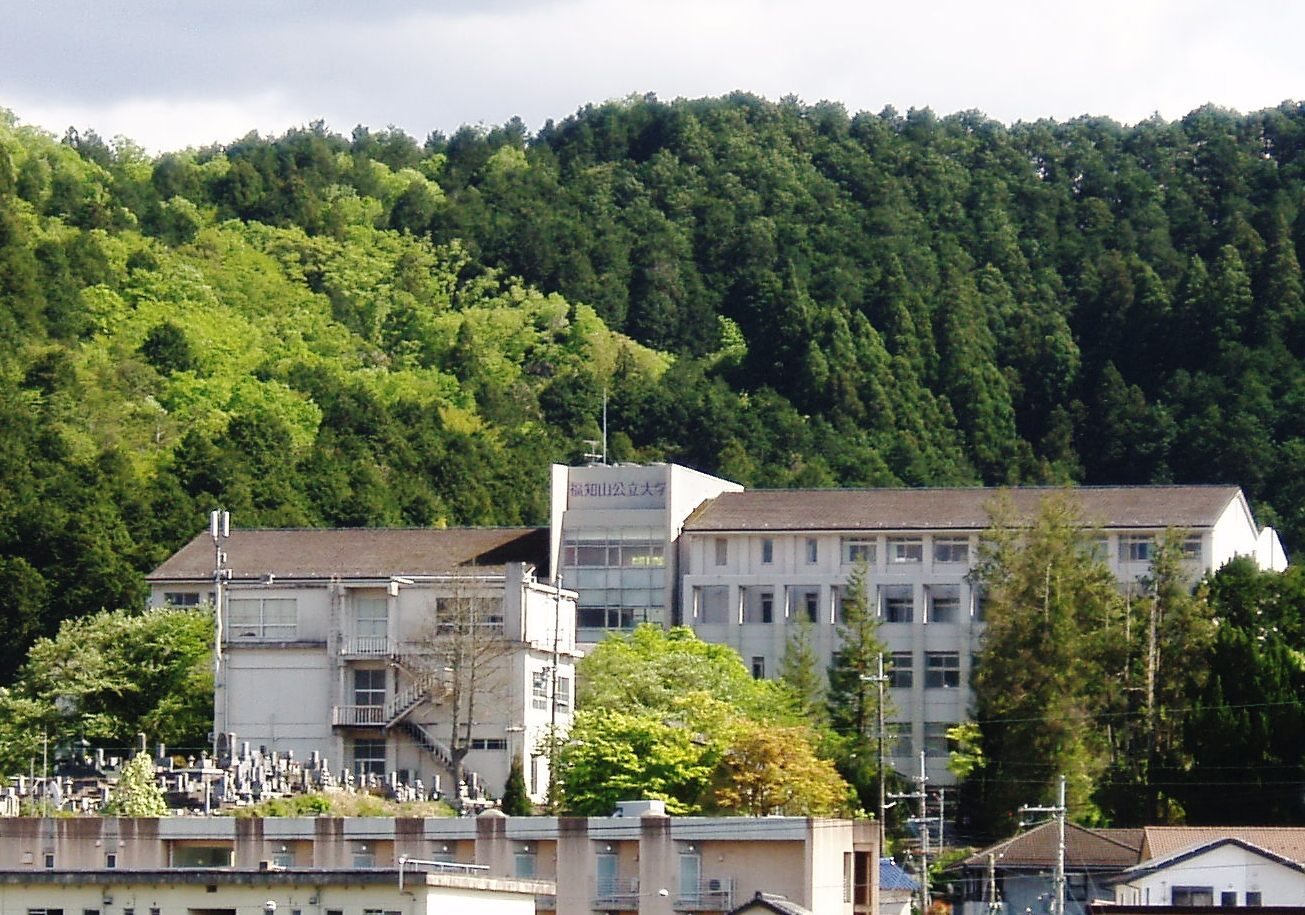
- Type: Public
- Established: 2000
- Endowment: N/A
- Academic staff: 24 full-time 12 part-time
- Administrative staff: N/A
- Undergraduates: 371
- Address: 3370 Hori, Fukuchiyama-shi, Kyoto-fu 620-0886, Fukuchiyama, Kyoto, Japan
- Campus: Urban
- Colors: Purple White
- Website: The University of Fukuchiyama

The University of Fukuchiyama (福知山公立大学, Fukuchiyama kōritsu daigaku) is a public university in Fukuchiyama, Kyoto, Japan.

The University of Fukuchiyama is a part of the Seibi Gakuen school system, which also includes Seibi High School, and Seibi Junior College. The university offers regional management and informatics.

== History ==
The school's predecessor, Kyoto Sosei University (京都創成大学, Kyōto sōsei daigaku), was founded in 1871 as a private school in Fukuchiyama, Kyoto. It was chartered as a junior college in 1950, and as a four-year university in 2000, then renamed Seibi University in 2010. In 2016, it became a public university and was renamed the University of Fukuchiyama.
