= Dōtonbori =

Coordinates: 34°40′07″N 135°30′05″E

Dōtonbori 道頓堀
- Area
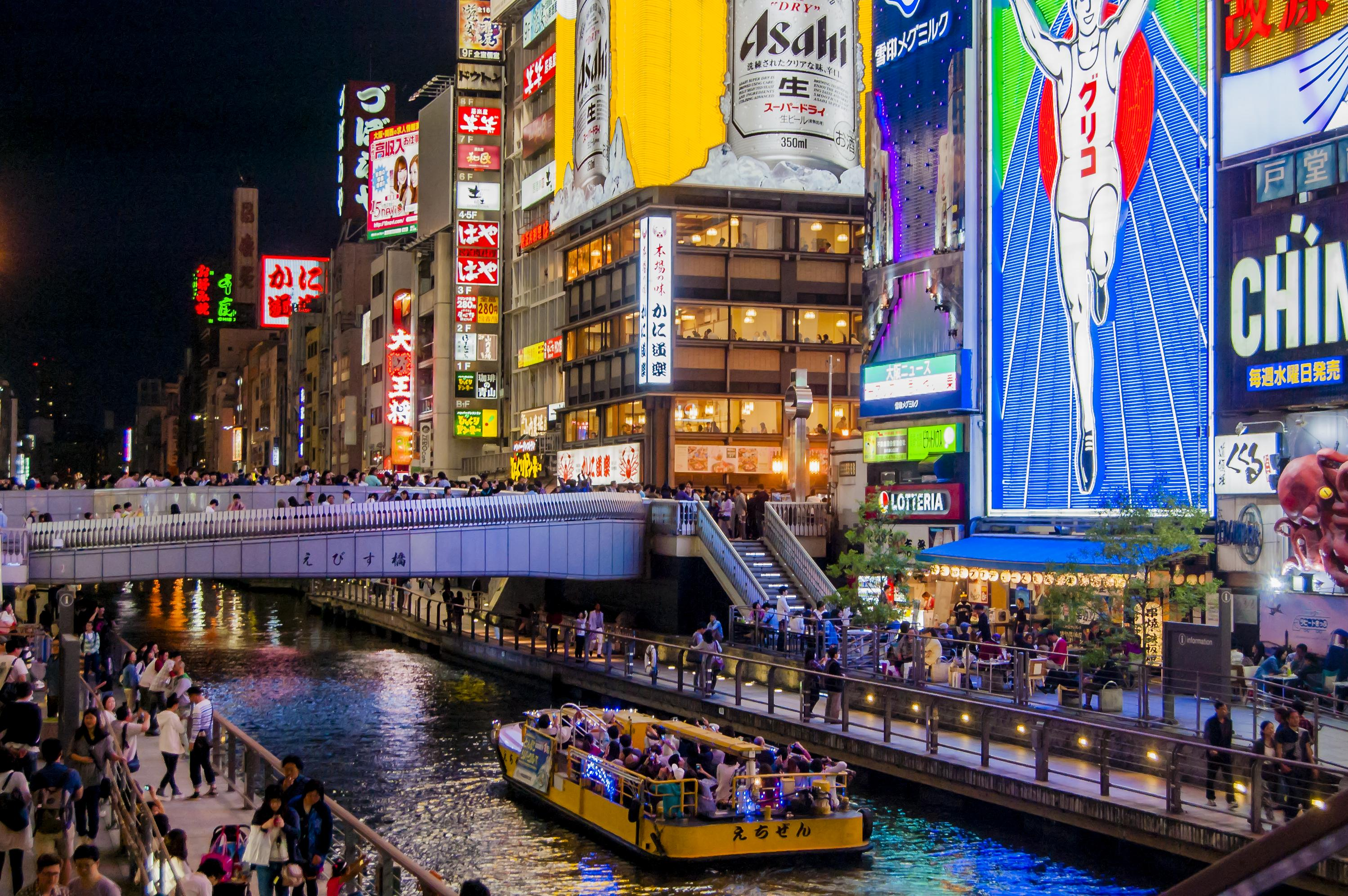
- Illuminated signboards at Ebisu Bridge on the Dōtonbori Canal
- Interactive map of Dōtonbori
- Country: Japan
- City: Osaka
- Established: 1612
- Founder: Yasui Dōton

Dōtonbori or Dōtombori (道頓堀; pronounced [do̞ːtõ̞mbo̞ɾʲi]) is a district in Osaka, Japan. Known as one of Osaka's principal tourist and nightlife areas, the area runs along the Dōtonbori canal from Dōtonboribashi Bridge to Nipponbashi Bridge in the Namba district of the city's Chūō ward. Historically a theater district, it is now a popular nightlife and entertainment area characterized by its eccentric atmosphere and large illuminated signboards.

One of the area's most prominent features is an illuminated billboard, known as Glico Man, for confectionery company Glico displaying the image of a runner crossing a finishing line, which is often seen as an icon of Osaka within Japan.

== History ==
Historical images of Dōtonbori

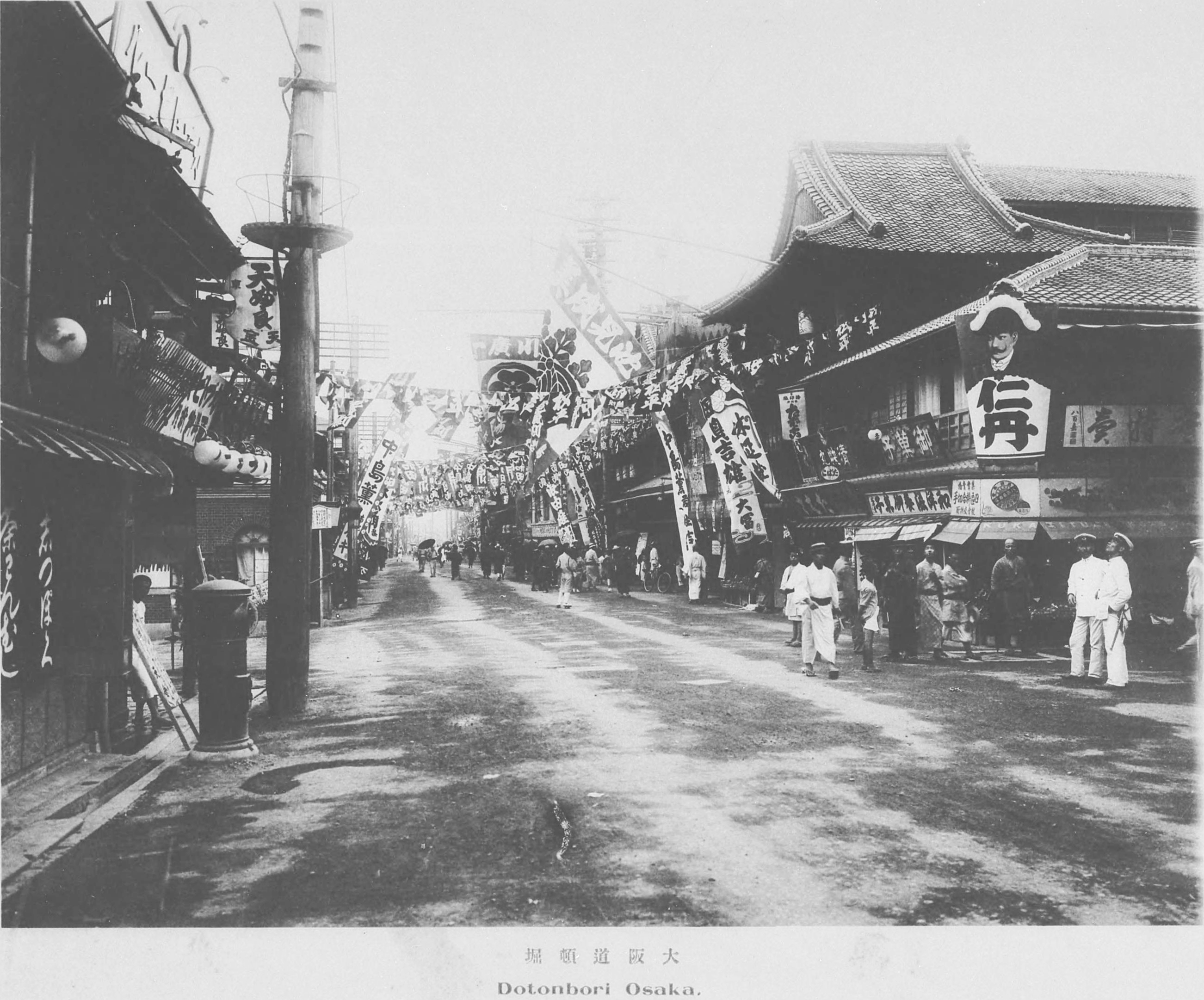
1910

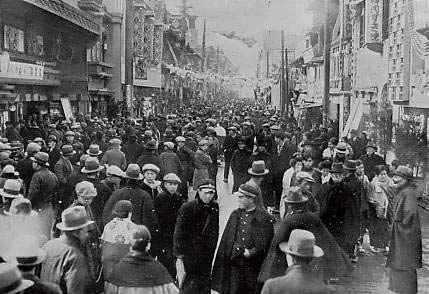
1930s

=== Origin ===
Dōtonbori traces its history back to 1612, when the administrator of local canals, Nariyasu Dōton, began construction of the canal on the southern edge of Osaka. Nariyasu Dōton was joined by Yasui Jihē, Yasui Kuhē, and Hirano Tōjirō. Construction was interrupted: Yasui Jihē died after an illness and Nariyasu Dōton died during the Siege of Osaka in summer 1615, having fought on the losing side of Toyotomi Hideyori. Yasui Kuhē and Hirano Tōjirō continued construction and the canal was completed by September 1615. The new lord of Osaka Castle, Matsudaira Tadaaki, named the canal and avenue beside it Dōtonbori ("bori" from "hori", meaning "canal"), even though Nariyasu Dōton had been on the losing side during the siege.

Over time, the story changed to credit the canal to a fictional local entrepreneur, Yasui Dōton. According to the revised story, Yasui Dōton began expanding the tiny Umezu River at his own expense in 1612, hoping to increase commerce in the region by connecting the two branches of the Yokobori River with a canal running east–west. He also died during the Siege of Osaka and his cousin finished the canal in 1615. The popularity of the revised story resulted in a stone monument erected for Yasui Dōton in 1915 at the north end of Nipponbashi. In the 1965 Dōtonbori Trial (道頓堀裁判) disputing the ownership rights of the canal, it was determined that Yasui Dōton was a fictional character, based on Yasui family records dating back to the 1600s.

The character of Dōtonbori became defined in 1621 when the Tokugawa Shogunate instituted urban planning and designated Dōtonbori as the entertainment district of Osaka. Yasui Kuhē is credited with luring playhouses and performance tents to the district, and the theatre owners rewarded the Yasui family by reserving a box for each performance. By 1662, the avenue boasted six Kabuki theatres and five Bunraku theatres, as well as the unique Takeda Karakuri mechanical puppet theatre. Many restaurants and cafes were built to cater to the flood of tourists and entertainment-seekers pouring nightly into Dōtonbori.

Selected locations in Dōtonbori
- Bridges
- Parks and open spaces
- Points of interest
1 Shinsaibashi-suji (心斎橋筋)
2 Nipponbashi (日本橋) / Sakaisuji Line
3 Aiaibashi (相合橋)
4 Tazaemonbashi (太左衛門橋)
5 Ebisubashi (戎橋)
6 Dōtonboribashi (道頓堀橋) / Midōsuji
7 Cui-daore
8 Kani Dōraku (original location, Honten)
9 namBa HIPS

=== Modern development ===
Over the years, declining interest in traditional forms of entertainment led to the closing of most of Dōtonbori's original attractions. With the exception of the Osaka Shochikuza, its remaining theatres were all destroyed during World War II.

A redevelopment project was started in the 1960s to improve water quality in the canal. Land on the north and south banks was reclaimed to raise the river walls, and to partially fund the project, half the reclaimed land was sold to the owners of the land next to the canal. The other half was designated as a greenbelt parkway. The Dōtonbori Trial began when the descendants of Yasui Kuhē, one of the two people who had completed the canal in 1615, filed suit against the city and prefectural governments over ownership rights to the land along the canal.

Further development of the land bordering the canal began in 2001, and the 170 metres (560 ft) between Tazaemonbashi and Ebisubashi was opened to the public in 2004. Prior to that time, development along the canal primarily focused on the streets parallel to it (Dōtonbori Street on the south bank, and Sōemonchō Street on the north bank), and very few storefronts faced the canal itself.

== Attractions ==
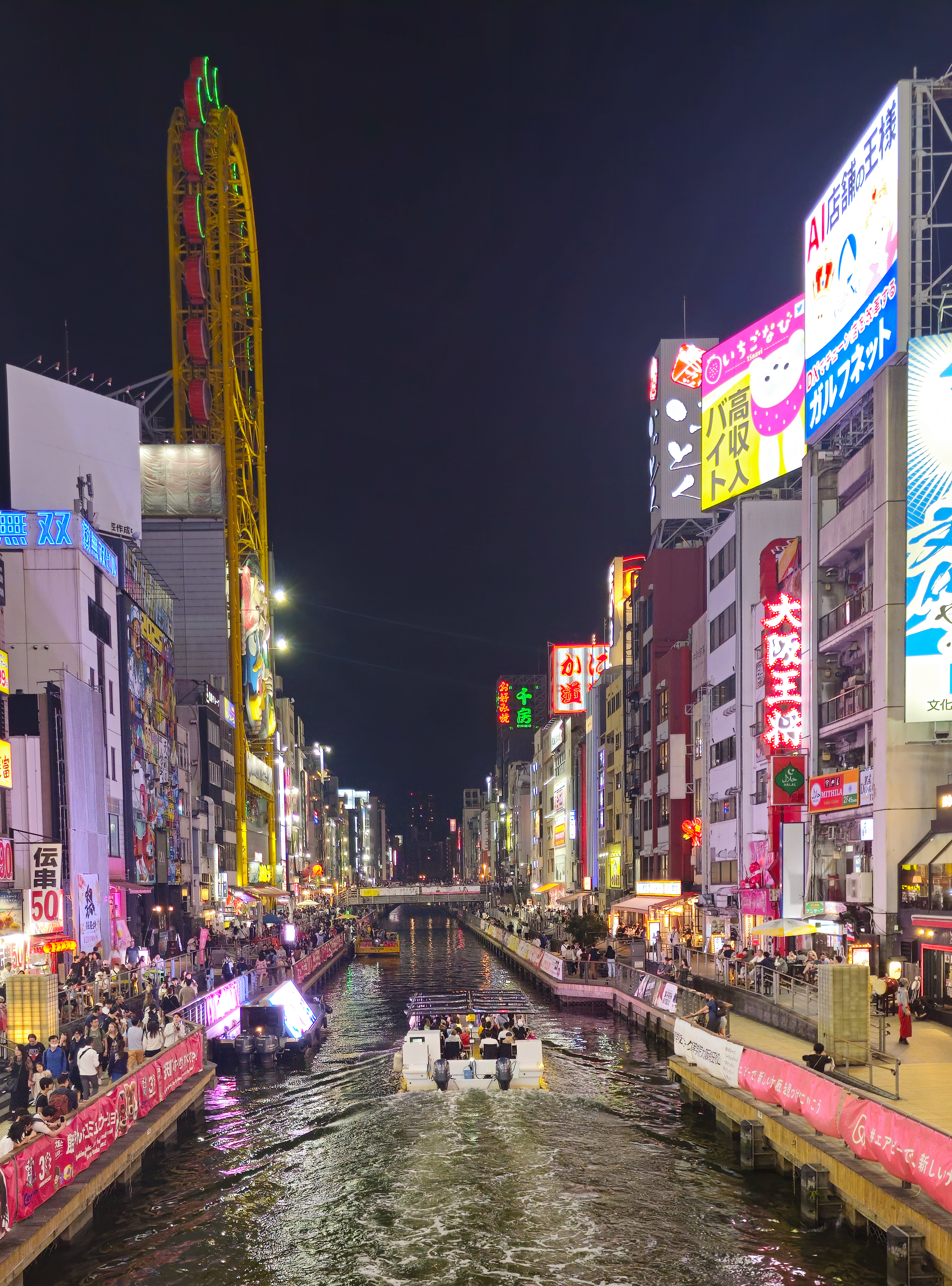
View of Dōtonbori from Midosuji Avenue

Kuidaore (食い倒れ) is a Japanese word meaning to ruin oneself [go bankrupt] by extravagant spending on food or, more pithily, "eat until you drop". It is part of a larger proverb: "Ruin yourself with fashions in Kyoto, ruin yourself with meals in Osaka" (「京都の着倒れ、大阪の食い倒れ」), reflecting local priorities (and artistry) in the clothing and food of Kyoto and Osaka, respectively.

The phrase is associated with Dōtonbori, and is often used in tourist guides and advertisements. It can be seen in the names of several locations in Dōtonbori, such as the mascot Kuidaore Taro and the defunct restaurant Cui-daore.

Some foods associated specifically with Osaka and kuidaore include okonomiyaki, takoyaki, and kitsune udon.

=== Restaurants ===
Osaka is a major destination for tourists, both domestic and international. The Dotonbori district is a popular area for visitors to the city and boasts a number of well known restaurants offering a range of traditional and modern Japanese dishes.

==== Notable restaurants ====
- Kinryū Ramen (金龍ラーメン): There are three Kinryū (Golden Dragon) Ramen restaurants in Dōtonbori, one at each end of the street and one in the middle. The chain, which opened its first location in 1982, is notable for its giant three-dimensional golden dragon billboards, as well as its seating consisting of tatami mats. Unlike many Japanese restaurants, Kinryū Ramen is open 24 hours, and offers a free garlic and kimchi bar.
- Kani Dōraku (かに道楽): A crab restaurant, famous for its moving crab billboard at several locations. There are three restaurants along Dōtonbori Street, south of the canal: the original/main western (Honten) location near Ebisubashi, the Nakamise (middle) one near Tazaemonbashi, and the eastern (Higashimise) one near Nipponbashi. The original location opened in 1962 and the current moving crab sign was installed in 1996. Prior incidents involving the sign include an accident in 1984, when a leg fell off and struck a customer, and 2003, when fans of the local Hanshin Tigers baseball team climbed the sign and removed the eyes.
- Otakoya (大たこ): A popular takoyaki stand which started in 1972 on Dōtonbori Street near Tazaemonbashi; it was forced to move in 2010 because the original site was municipal land. One of the primary attractions is the size of the octopus used.
- Zubora-ya (づぼらや): A fugu restaurant with a huge blowfish lantern hanging out front. Zubora-ya first opened for business in 1920 at its original and main location in Shinsekai, Naniwa Ward, later opening a second branch on Dōtonbori Street. Both locations temporarily closed on April 8, 2020 for the COVID-19 pandemic; the closure was made permanent on September 15.
- Dōtonbori Ramen Taishokudo: A ramen restaurant formed by eight famous ramen shops from across Japan.
- Hariju (播重): A beef restaurant established in 1924; the present Dōtonbori location opened in 1948. They use only Japanese beef. One of the more famous beef restaurants.
- Imai (今井): An Udon restaurant since 1946; the flagship and original location is sometimes called Dōtonbori Imai Honten (道頓堀 今井 本店). The Imai family ran a teahouse (from the 1780s) and music instrument store (1913–1945) at the site, but the store burned during World War II and was rebuilt as a restaurant.
- Cui-daoré (くいだおれ), a massive eight-story restaurant with a different Osaka cuisine on each floor, was a self-proclaimed contender for the title of the world's largest restaurant. It was founded in 1949 by Rokuro Yamada and the Kuidaore Taro bunraku puppet was unveiled in 1950, with a face modeled from Yamada; the restaurant and puppet were intended to attract families with small children. The building was expanded into a large concrete structure in 1959, but it ceased operations and closed on 8 July 2008. Since then, the building has been remodeled and now houses a variety of shops and restaurants as the Nakaza Cui-daoré Building.
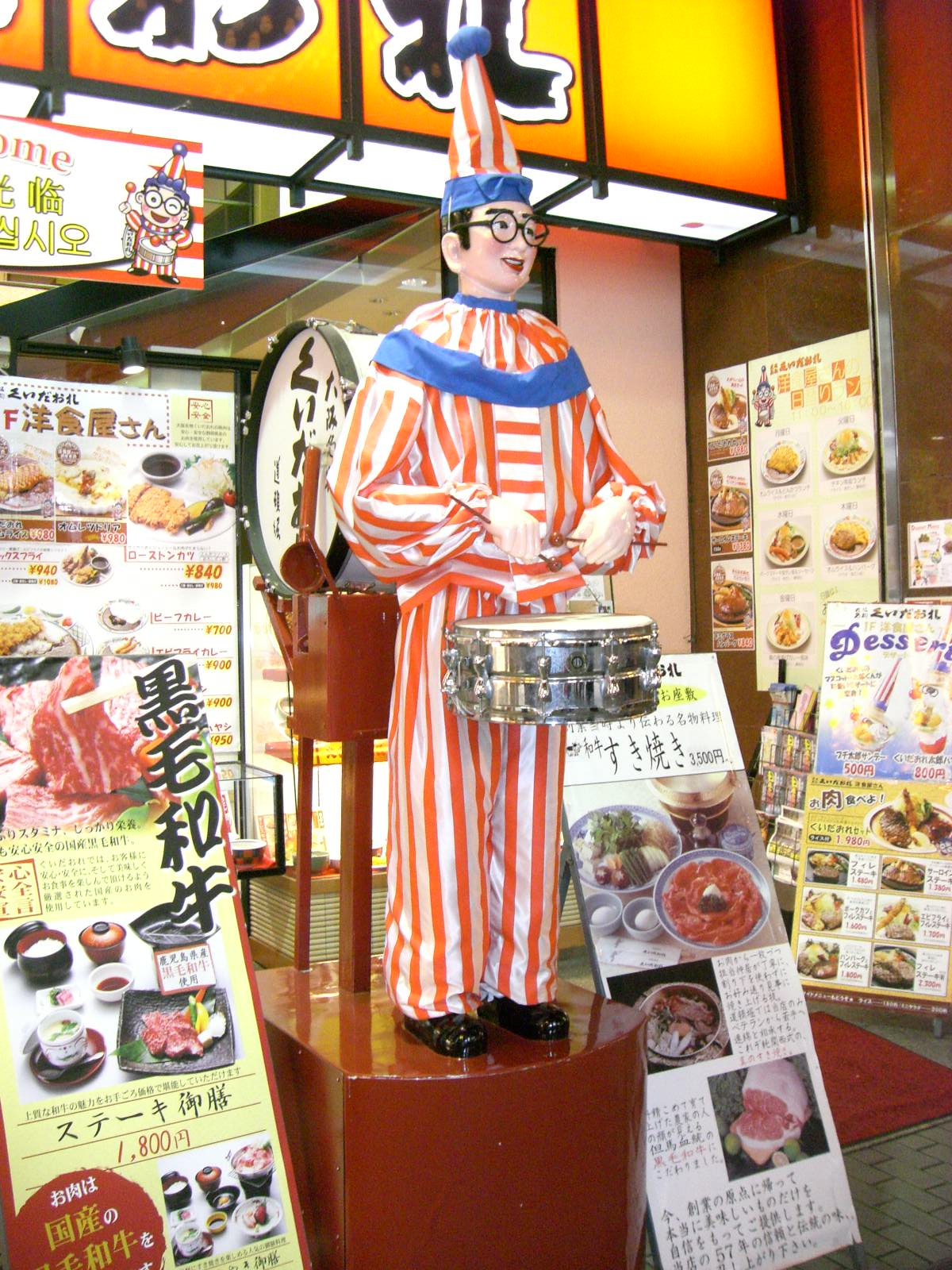
Kuidaore Taro

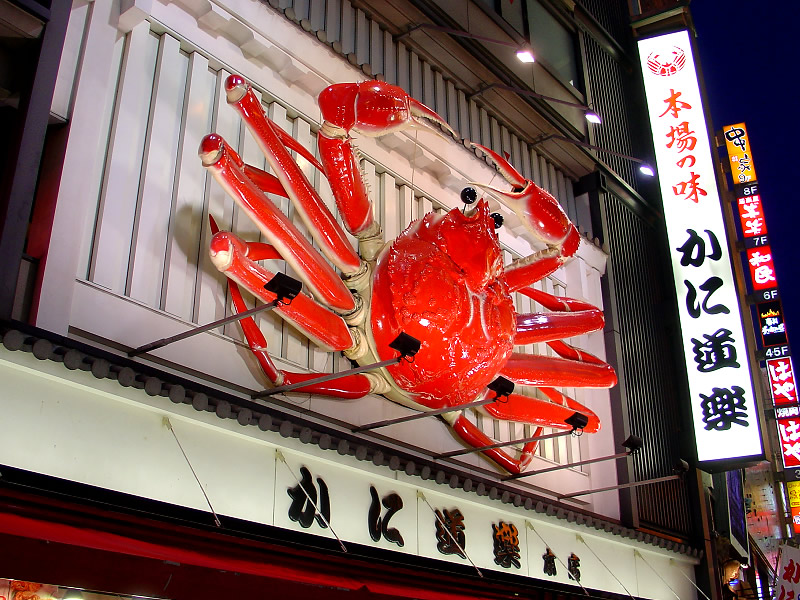
Kani Dōraku crab

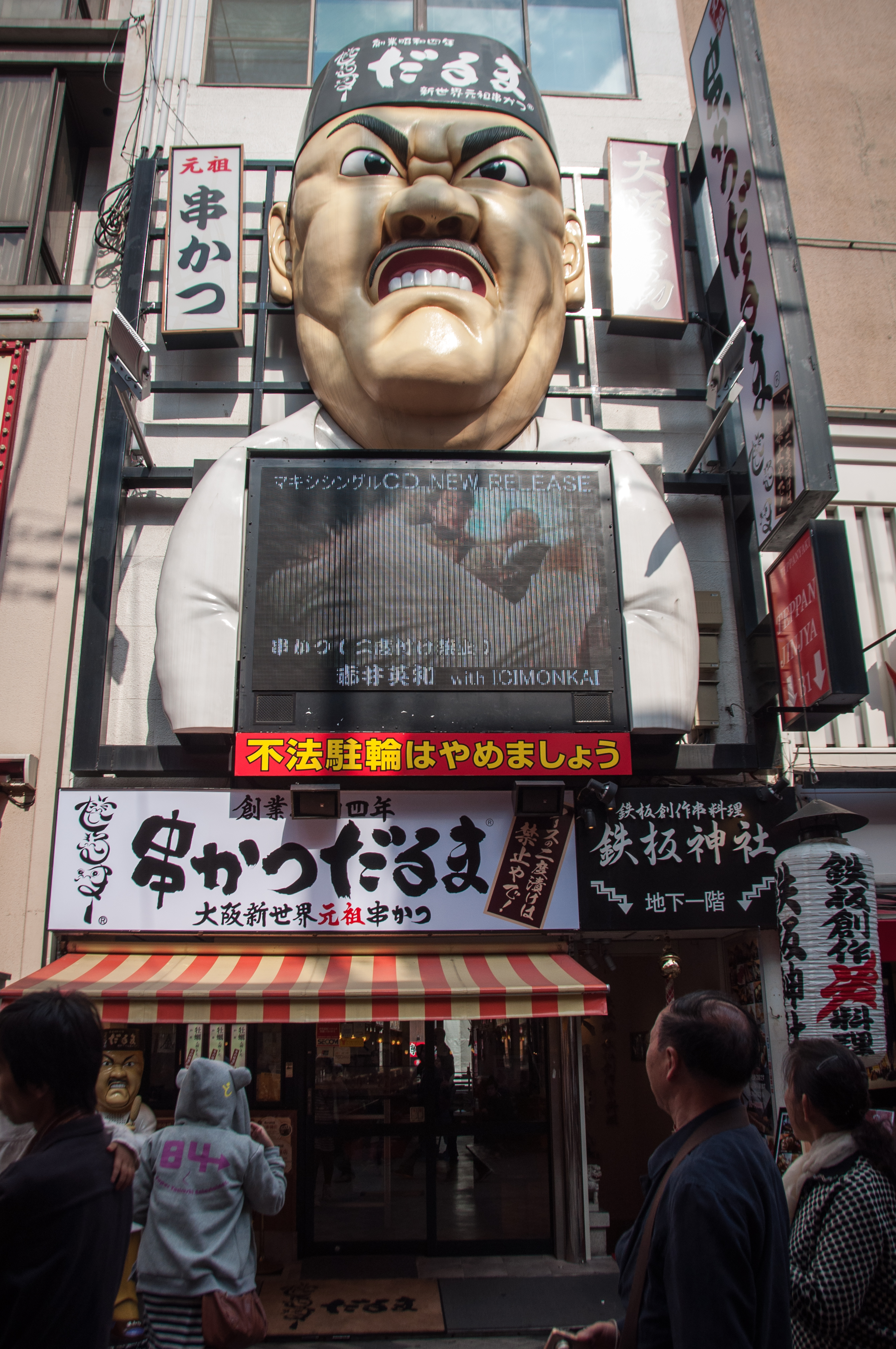
Kushikatsu Daruma

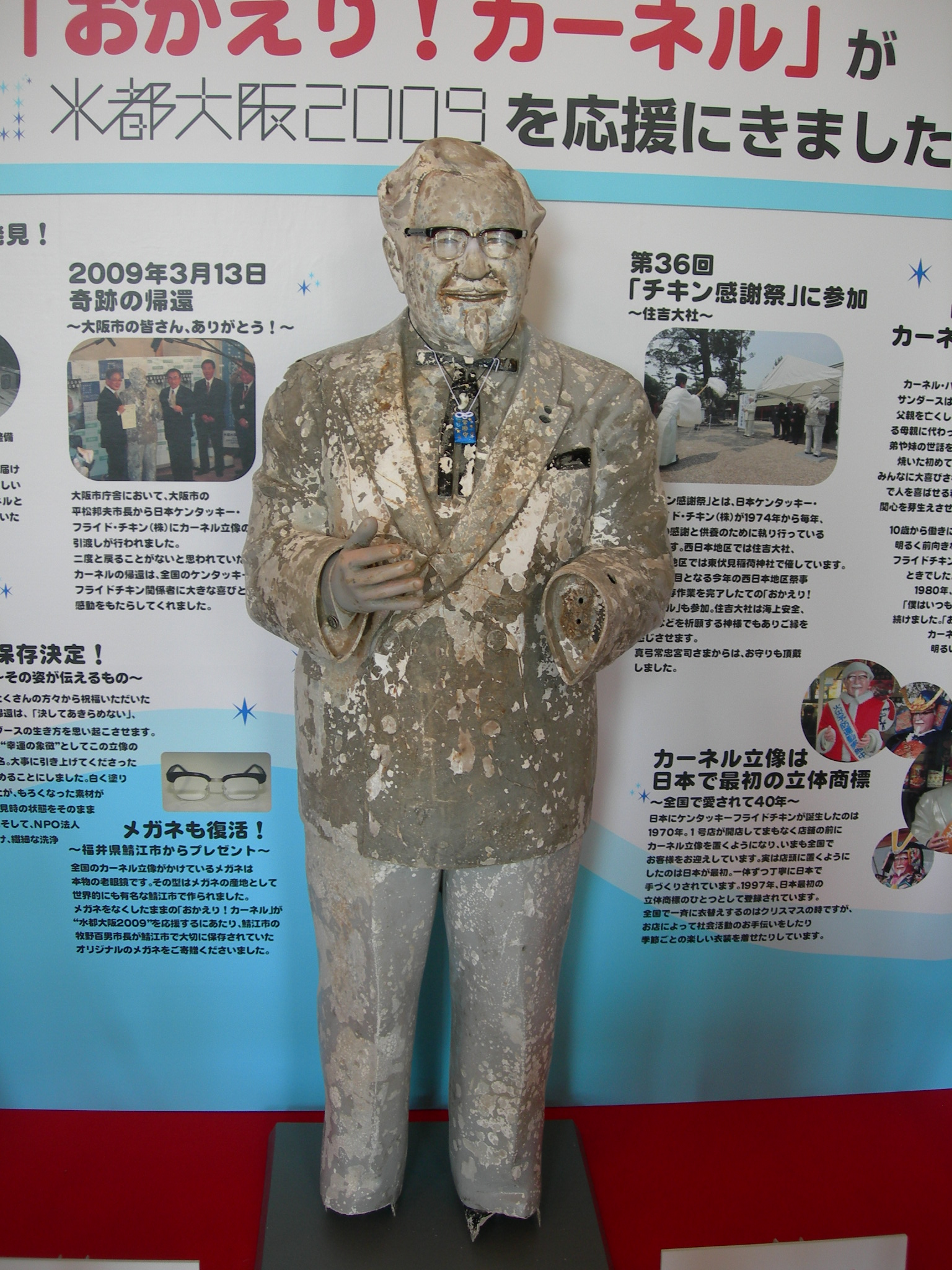
Recovered Colonel Sanders statue

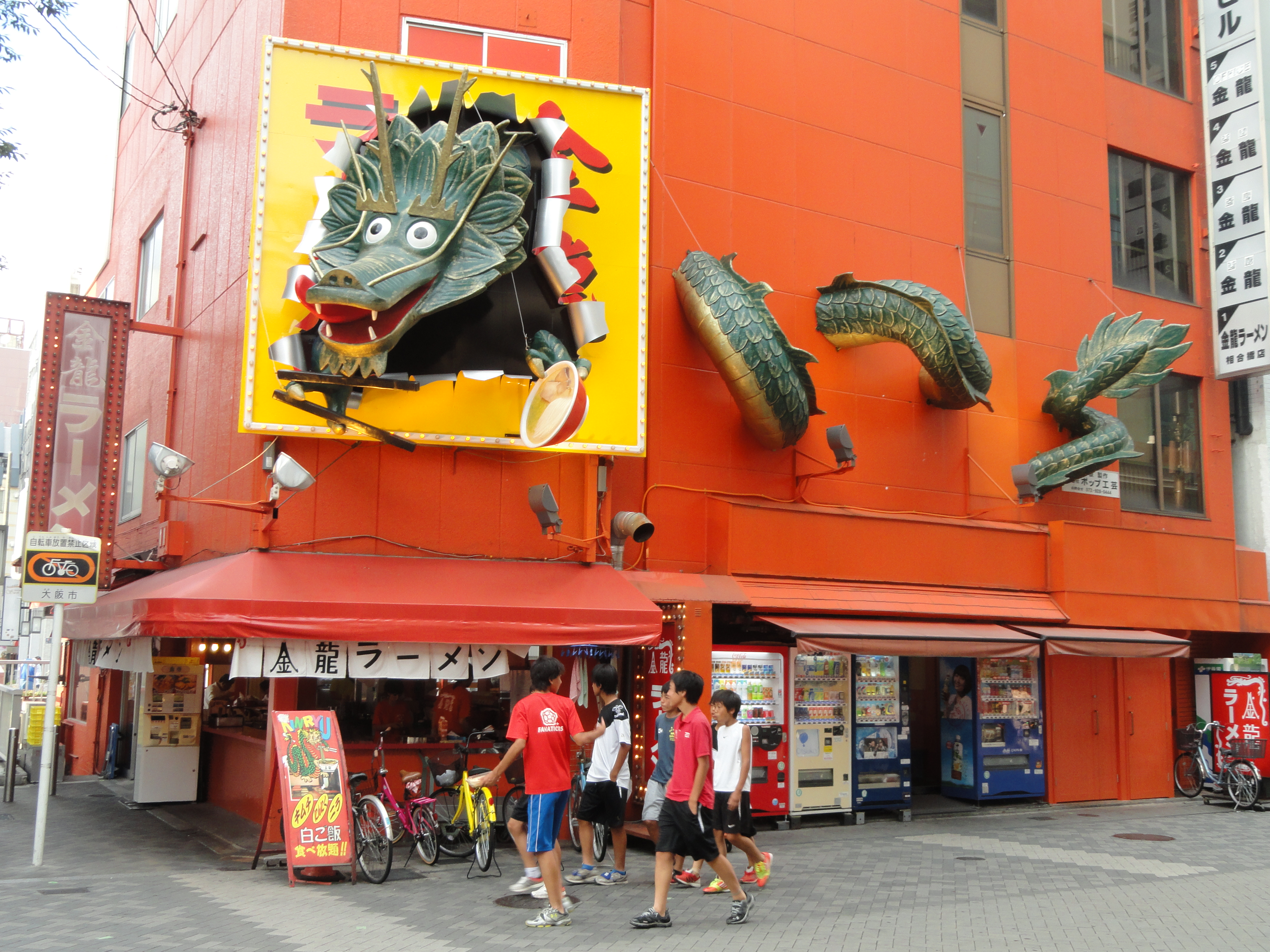
Kinryu Ramen

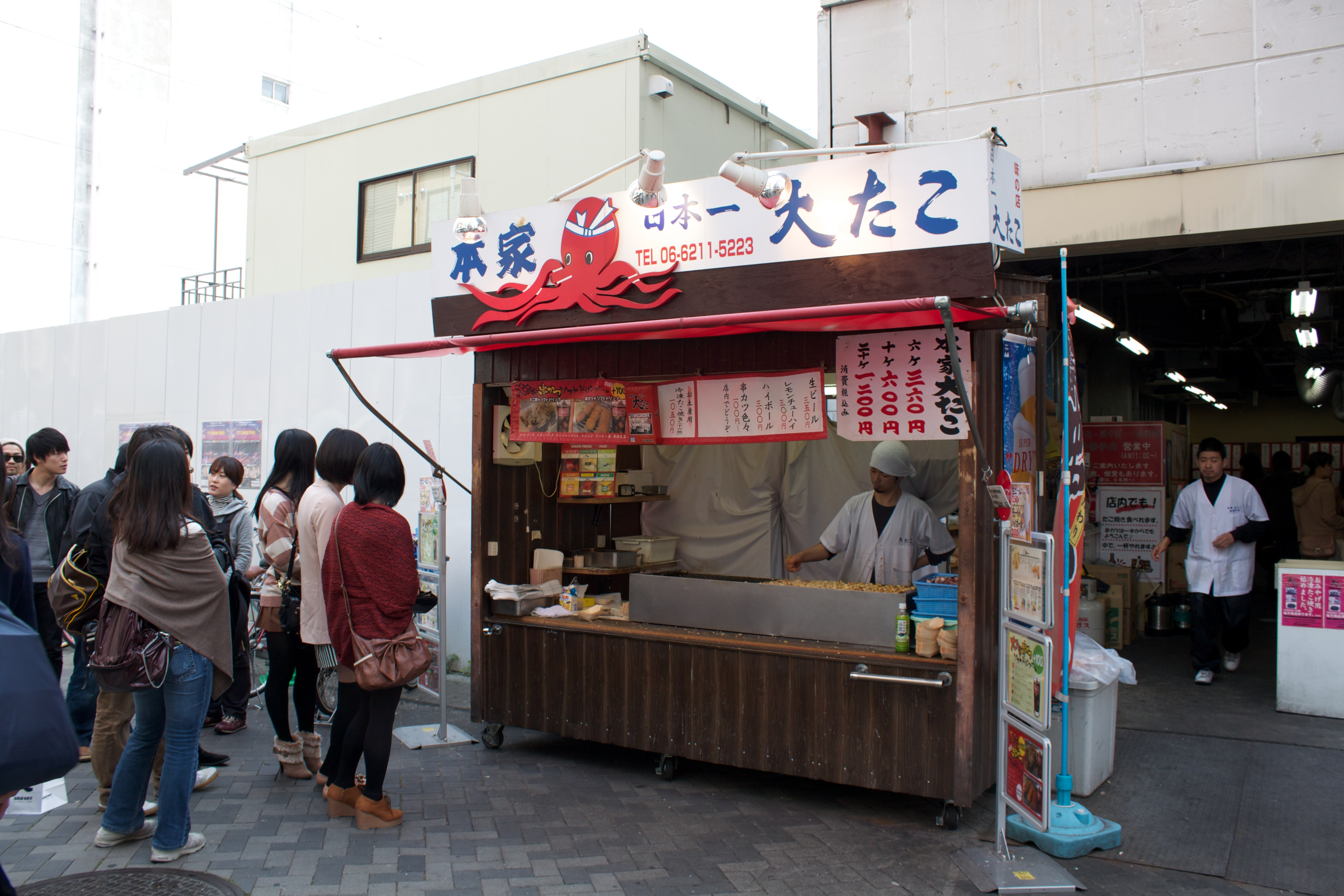
Otakoya (takoyaki stand)

=== Landmarks and sights ===
- Glico Man: Originally installed in 1935 by food processing company Ezaki Glico to promote their caramel candy, the sign depicts a giant runner on a blue track with both arms raised. The sign has been altered on several occasions to celebrate events such as the World Cup and to show support for Osaka's baseball team, the Hanshin Tigers. The current version is the sixth, which uses LEDs and was installed in October 2014. The previous five incarnations of the sign used neon lights. The sign is just west of Ebisubashi, on the south bank of the canal.
- Kuidaore Taro: In front of the Cui-daore building is a mechanical drum-playing clown, also known as the Kuidaore Ningyo, installed in 1950. Every March the visiting rikishi for the Osaka Grand Sumo tournament used to line up with Kuidaore Taro for photos. Now that the restaurant has closed, Kuidaore Taro has been moved to a new location slightly east of his old haunt.
- Kani Dōraku crab: This six and a half meter crab is on the front of the crab restaurant Kani Dōraku. It is mechanised, being able to move its arms and eyestalks. Built in 1960, this mechanical billboard soon spawned imitations, including a squid that puffs steam and oni (demons) that light up at night.
- Ebisu Tower: the ferris wheel, which reaches a height of 77 metres (253 ft), is built into the facade of the Dotonbori Don Quijote store branch and is decorated with an image of the god of fishermen and luck, Ebisu. Cracks were discovered in a rail, forcing it to shut down from June 2008 until it reopened on January 19, 2018 after the store spent ¥250 million to repair it. The store is just west of Tazaemonbashi, on the north bank of the canal.
- Gateway signs There are two illuminated signs that form gateways above Dōtonbori Street. The one at the western end of the district is decorated with animated neon lights, just west of the intersection with Midosuji. The other one, at the eastern end, is just west of the intersection with Sakaisuji.
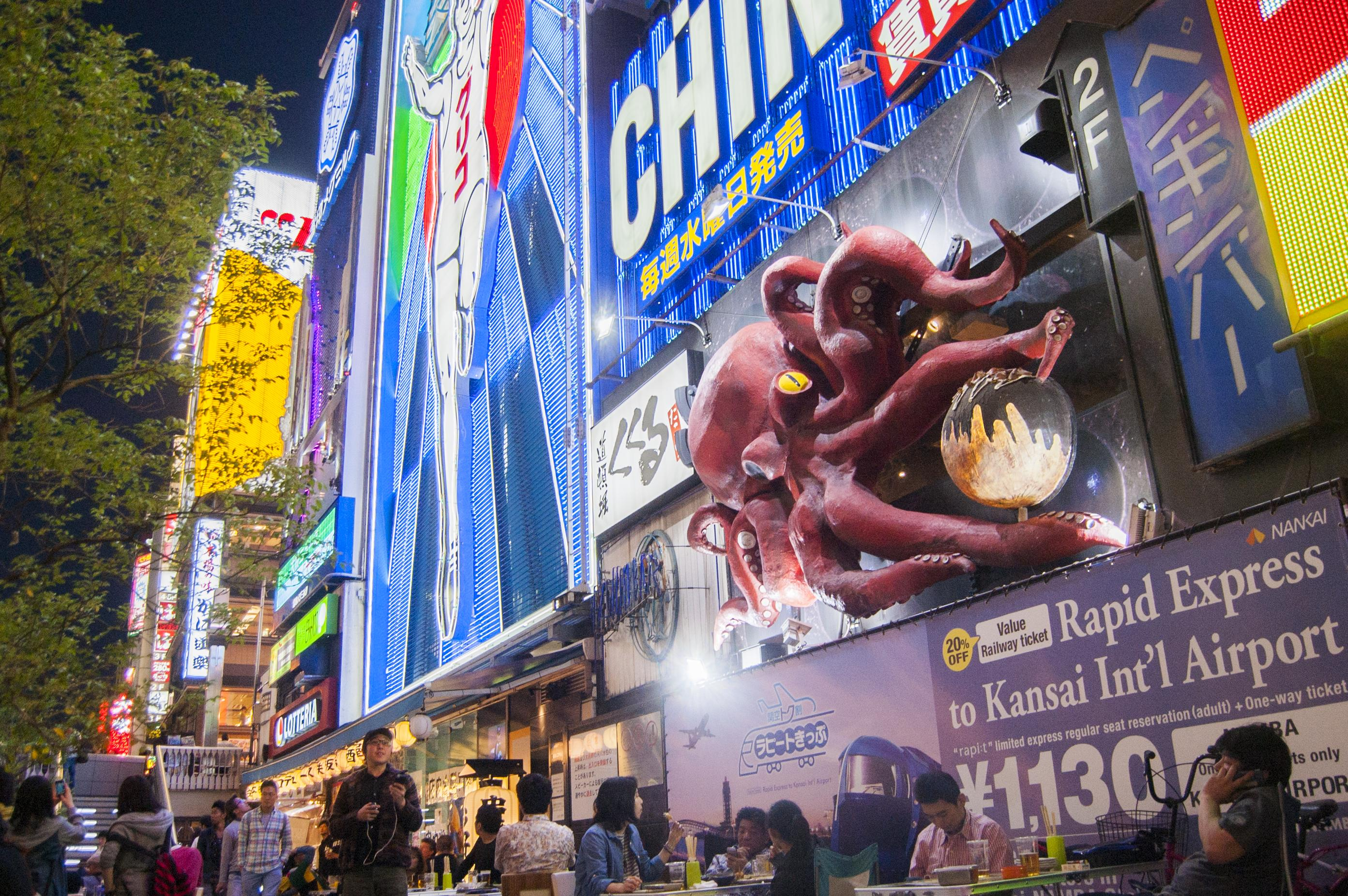
Visitors enjoy illuminated billboards, video screens and mechanized signs along the boardwalk near the Glico Man sign

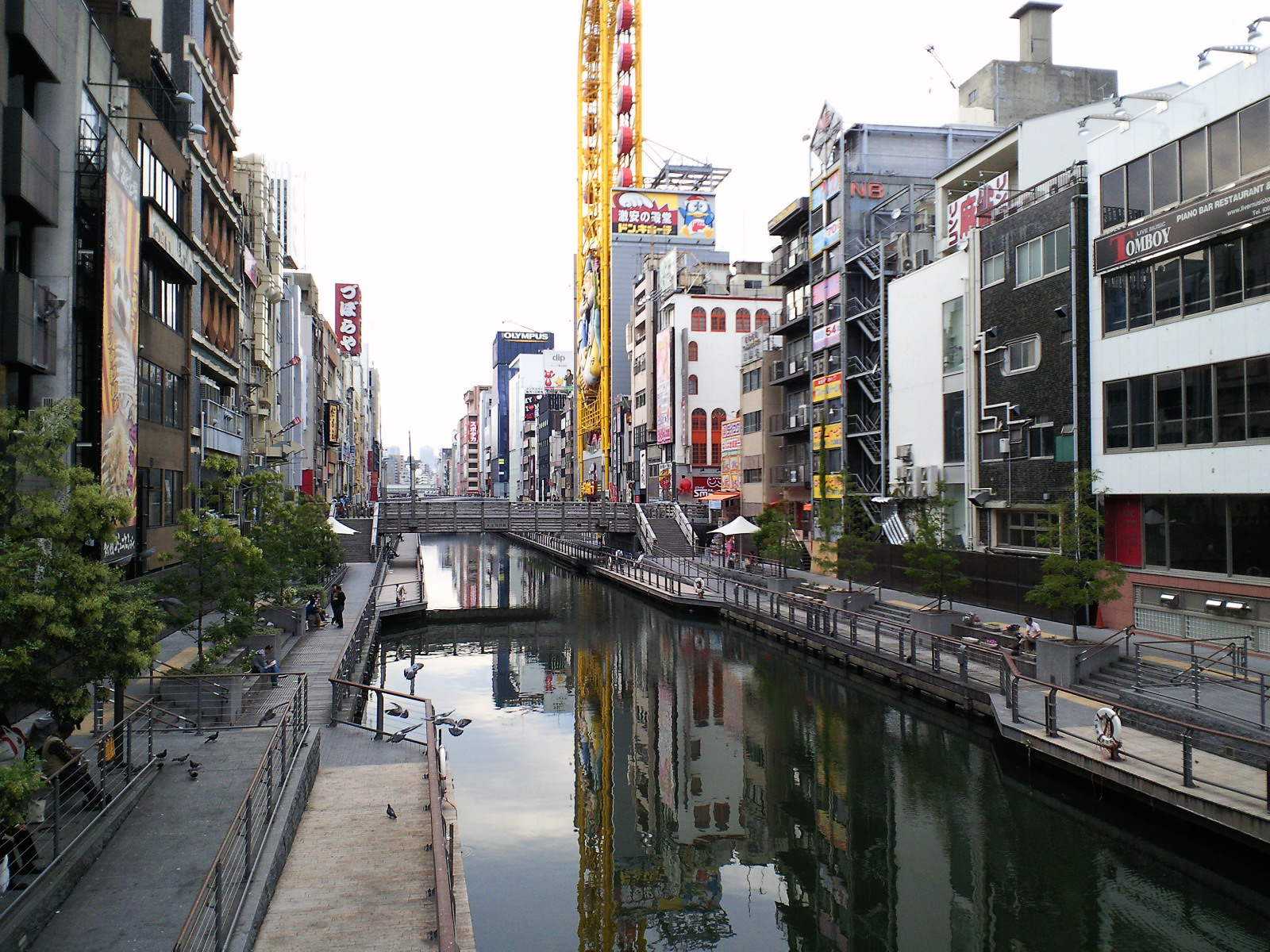
Day view of Dōtonbori canal from Aiaibashi, directed west

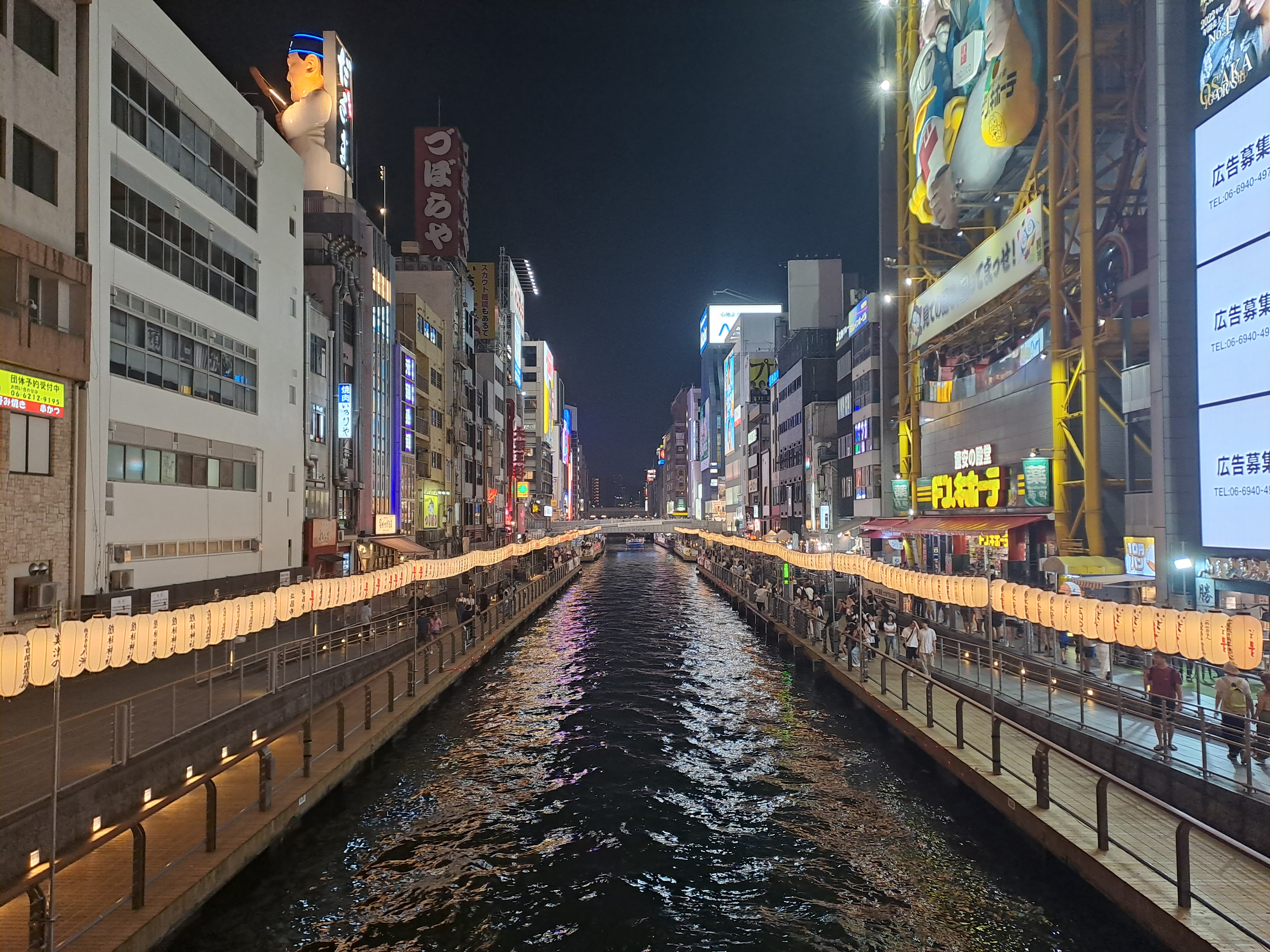
Dōtonbori canal at night, view from Tazaemonbashi, directed west

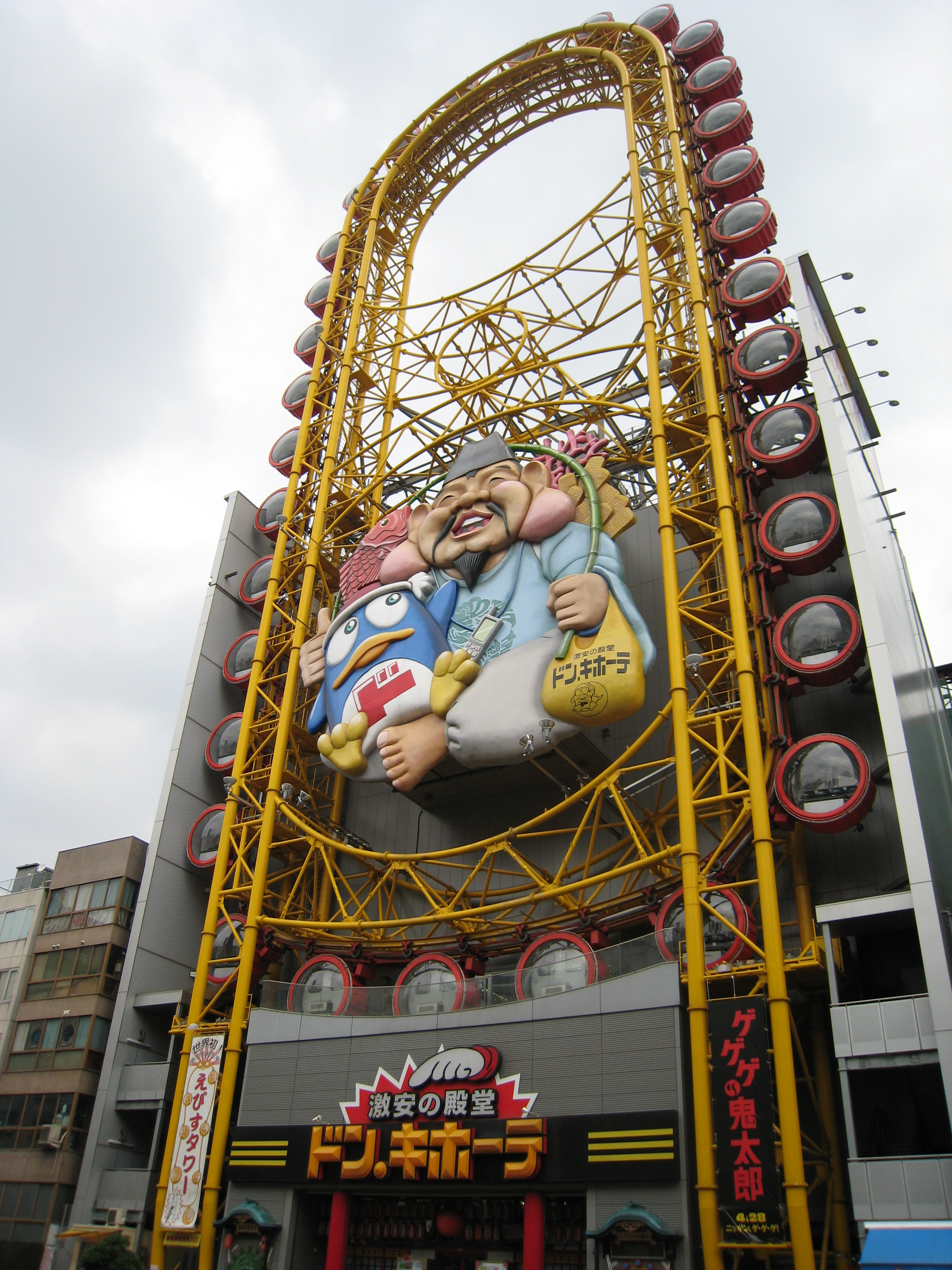
Ebisu Tower and ferris wheel

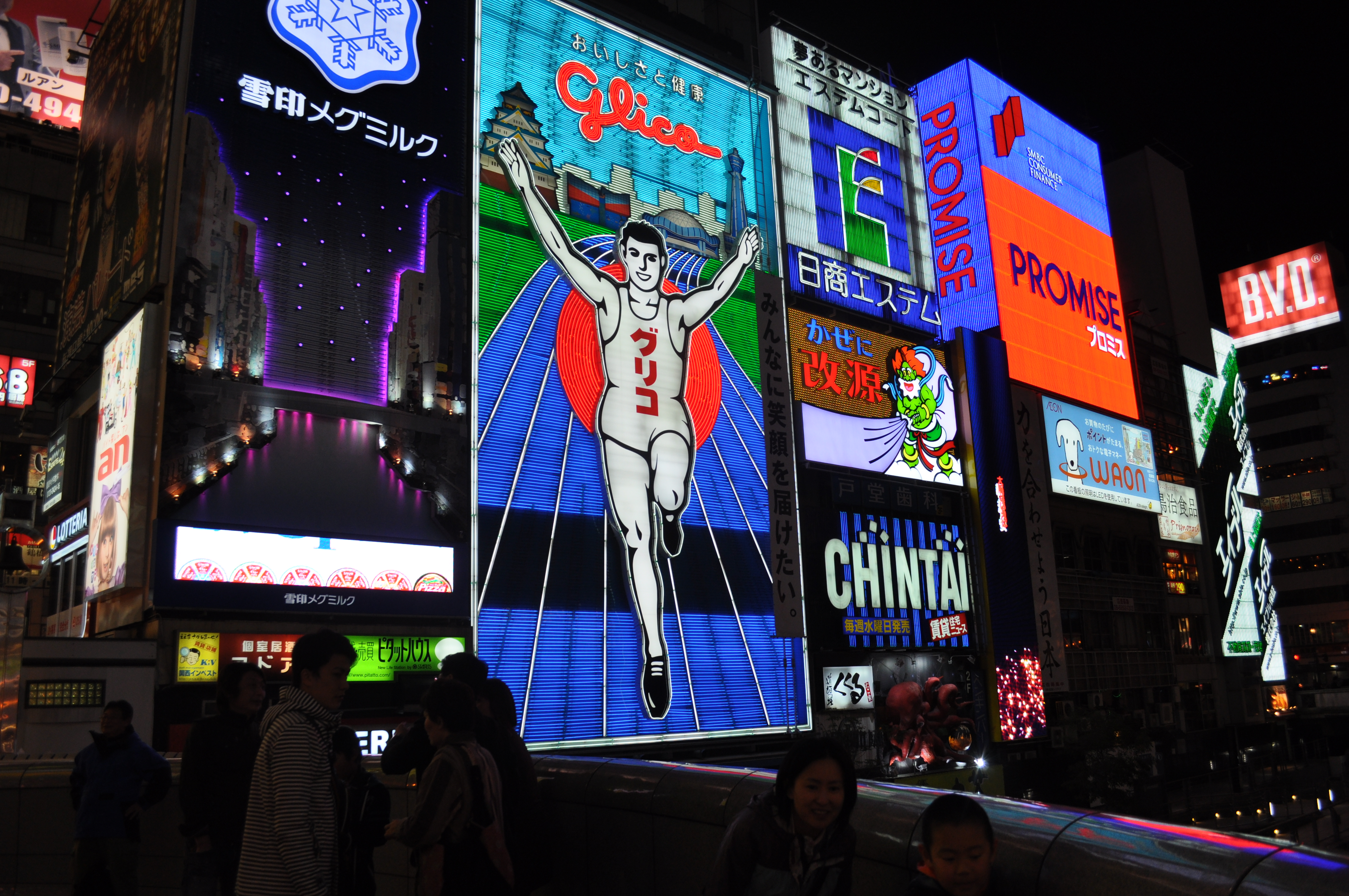
Glico Man sign (5th neon version), lit at night

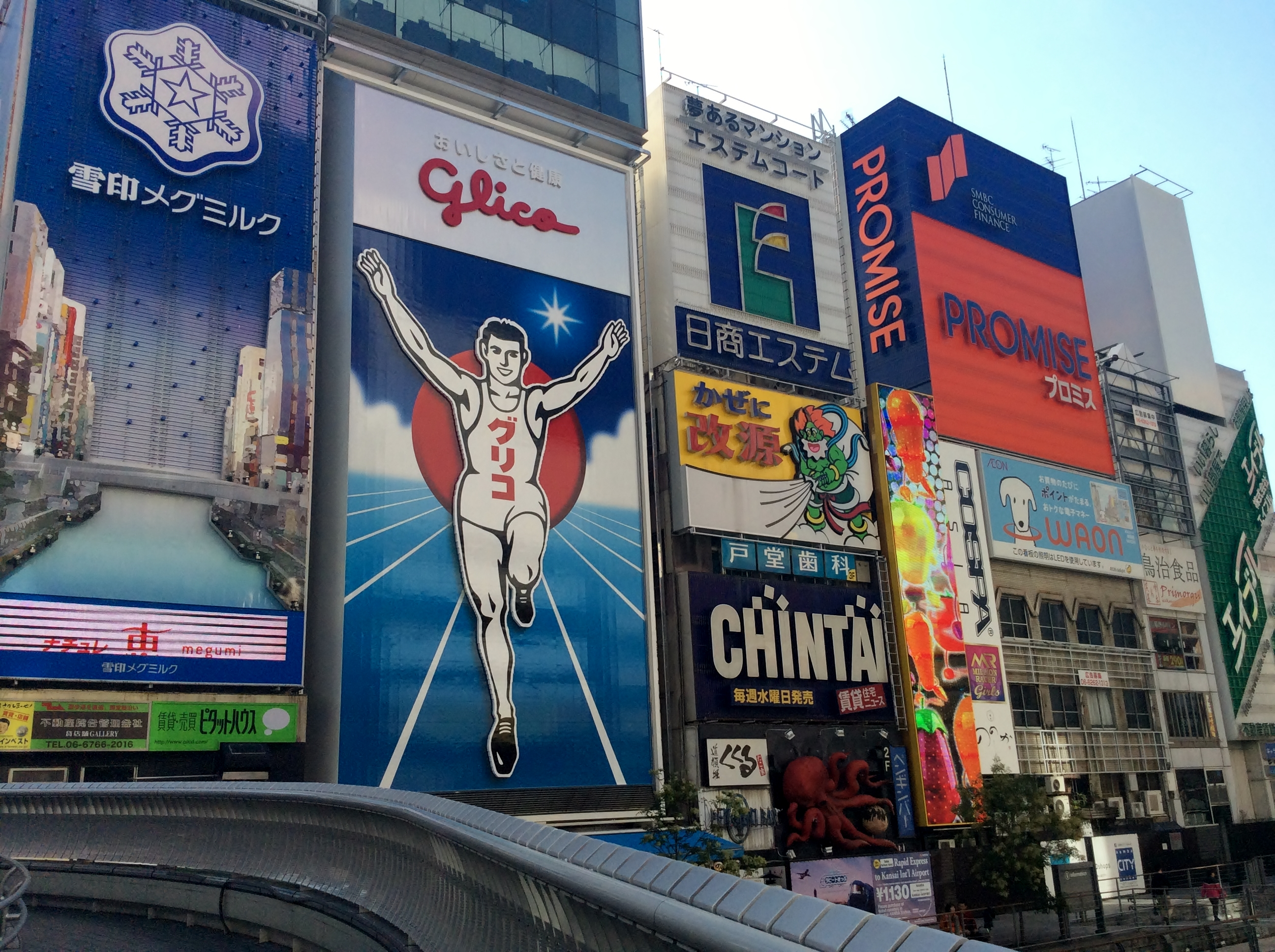
Day view of Glico Man sign (6th LED version) from Ebisubashi

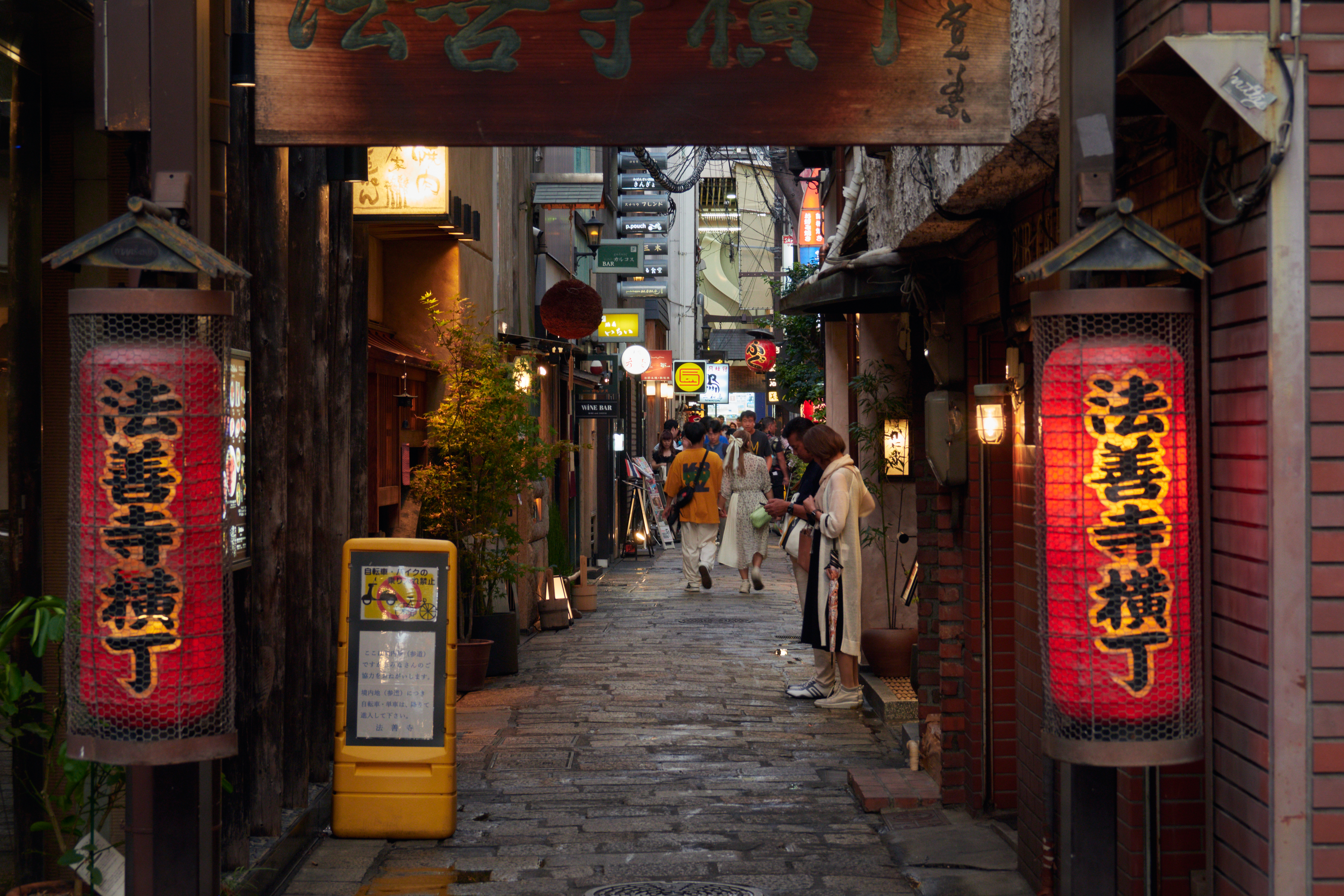
Hōzenji Yokochō

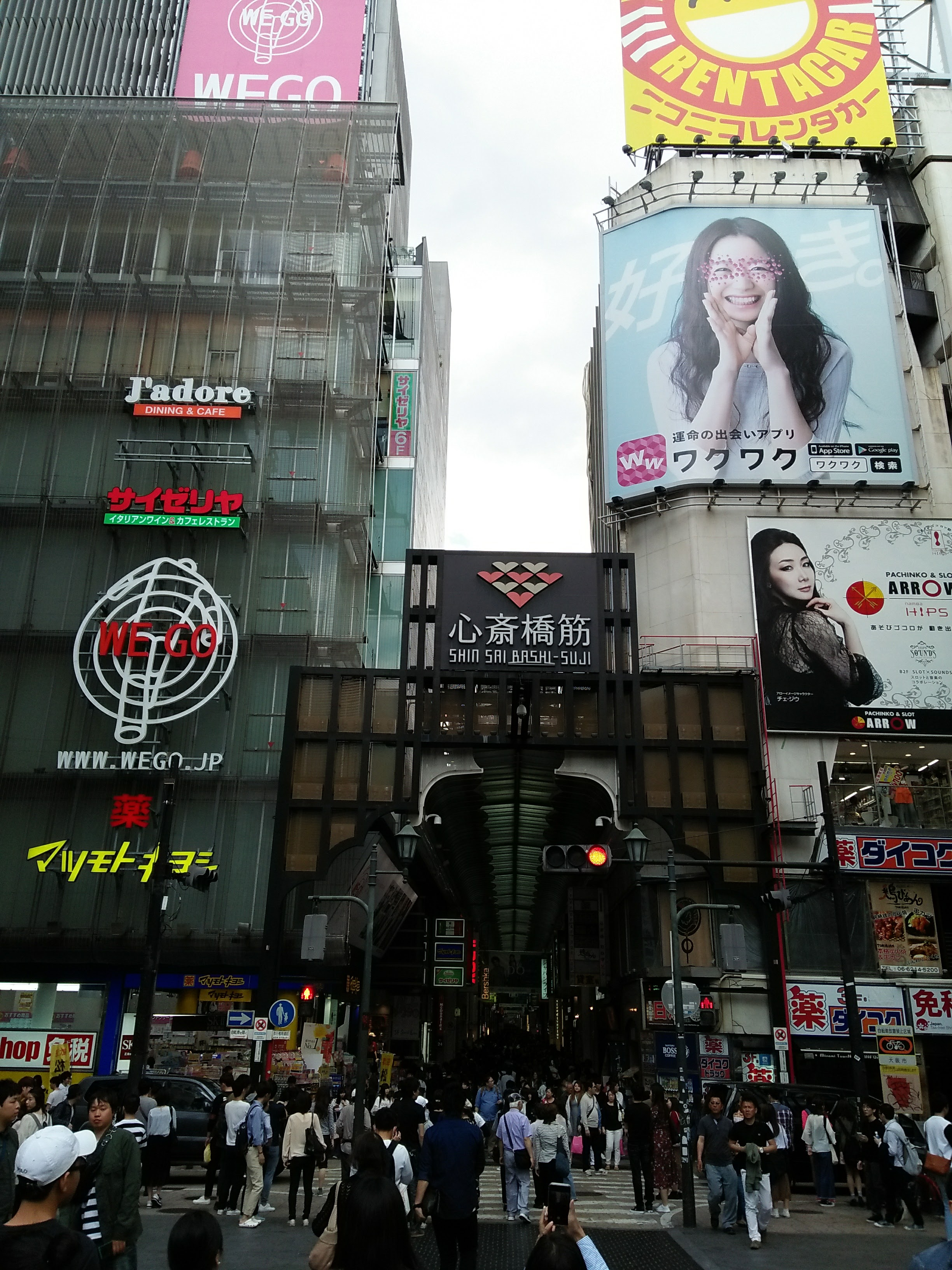
Shinsaibashi-suji, a covered shopping street complex north of Ebisubashi

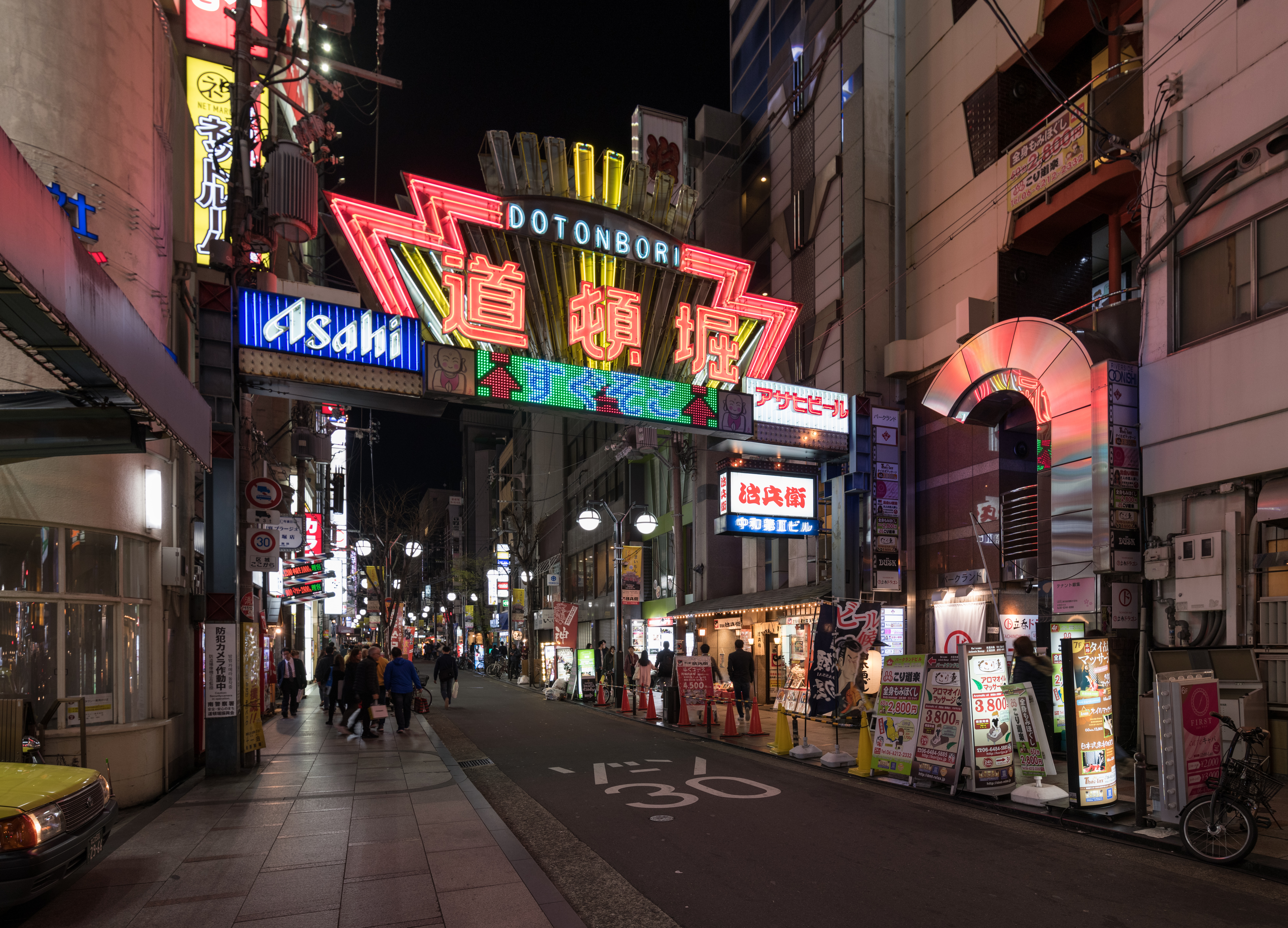
Western gateway sign (facing west)

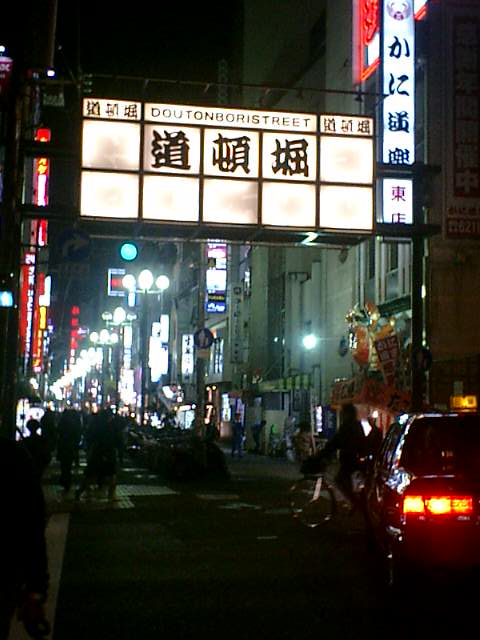
Eastern gateway sign (facing west)

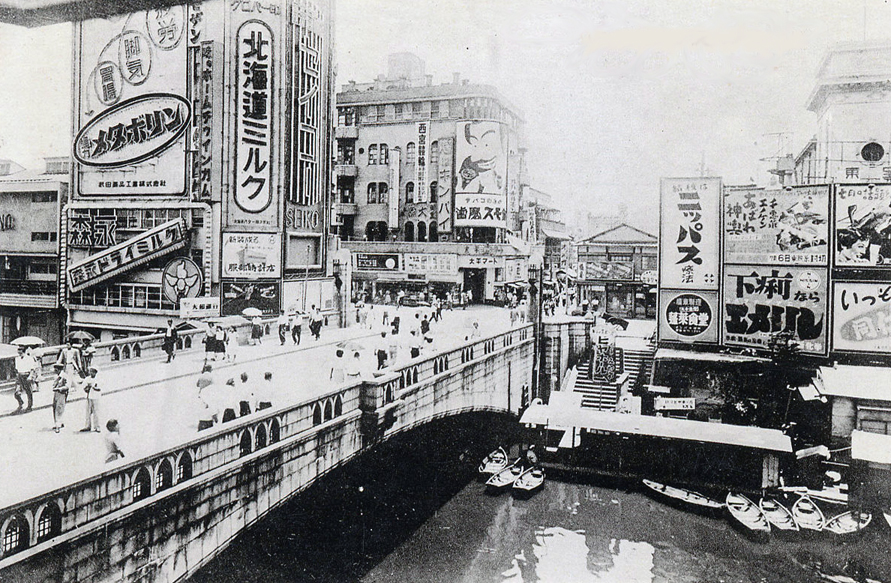
Ebisubashi (1951)

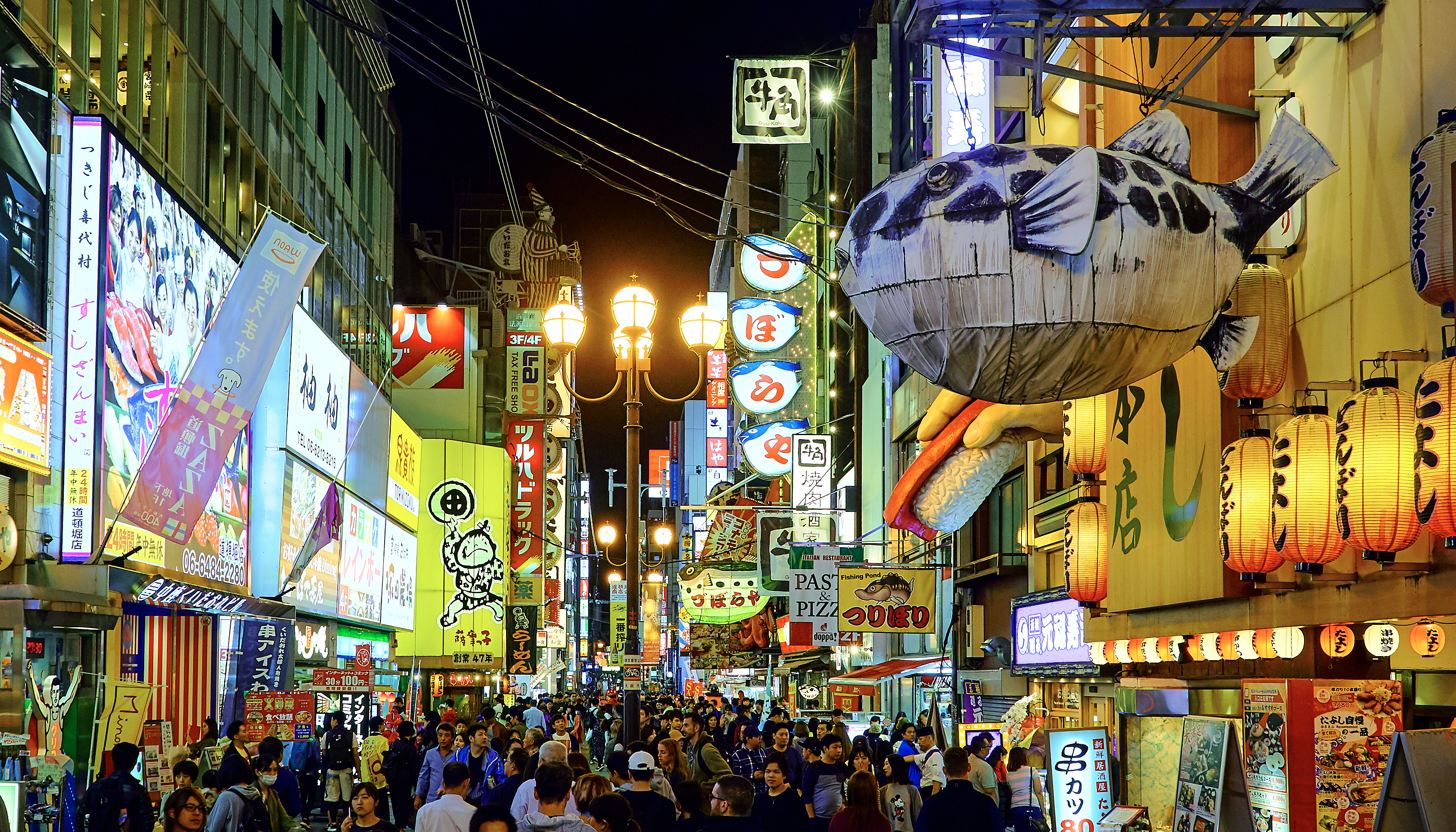
Illuminated signs lining Dōtonbori Street

Dōtonbori River Walk

=== Bridges ===
Motor vehicles cross the canal by way of either Dōtonboribashi (part of Midosuji Avenue) at the west end or Nipponbashi (part of Sakaisuji Avenue) at the east end of the main Dōtonbori district. In between are several footbridges connecting the Namba and Shinsaibashi shopping districts to Dōtonbori, such as Tazaemonbashi and Aiaibashi.

==== Ebisubashi ====
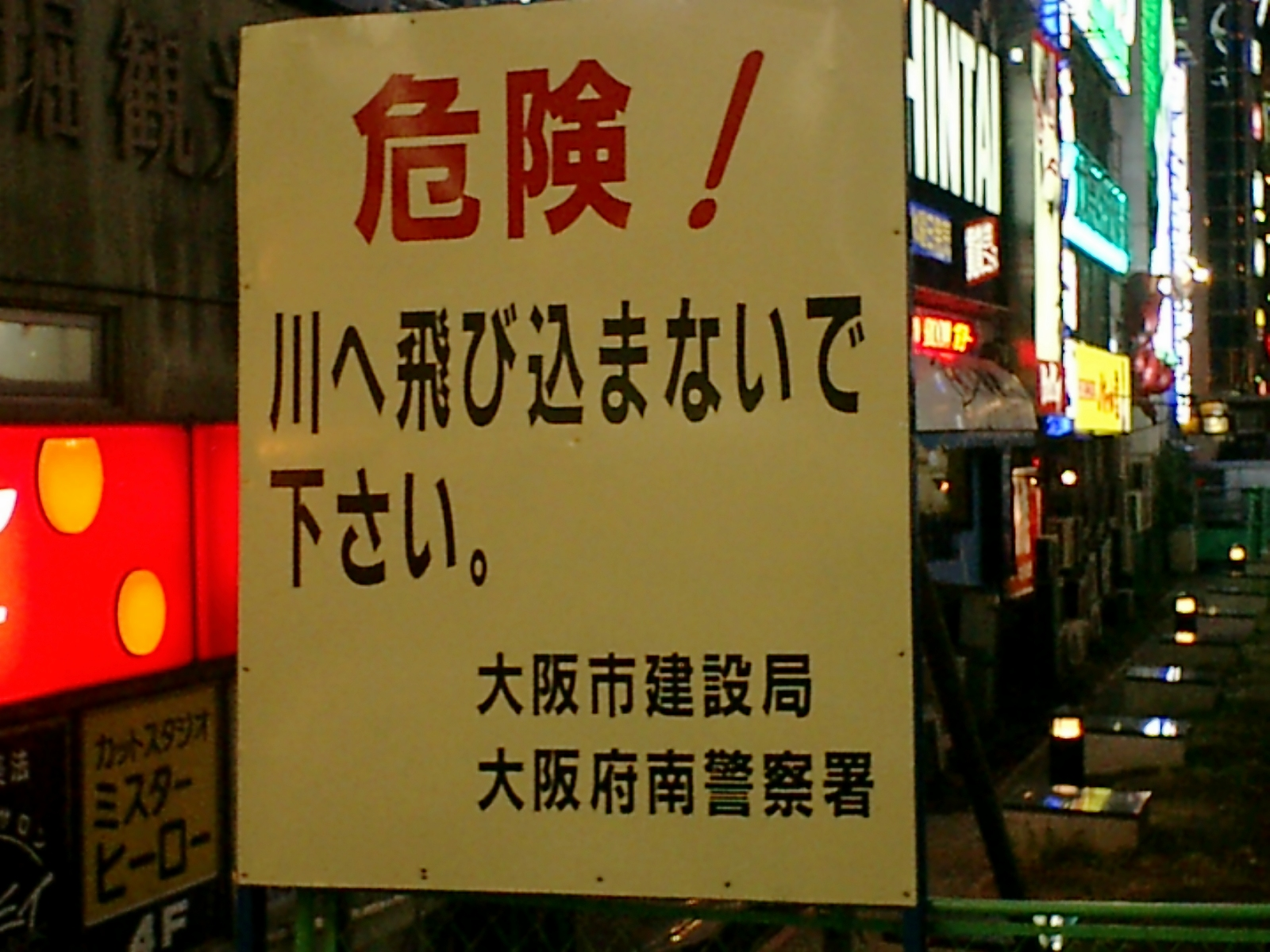
A sign in Dōtonbori advising visitors not to dive into the river.

Ebisubashi is just east of the Glico Man billboard. Originally constructed to provide access to the nearby Ebisu Shrine, the bridge is the location of a legendary curse, considered broken in 2023, on Osaka's baseball team, the Hanshin Tigers. More practically, the bridge provides a link between the Shinsaibashi-suji and Ebisubashi-suji shopping districts.

Due to the familiarity of the Glico Man, Ebisubashi makes for a convenient gathering point, hence its nicknames, nanpa-bashi, mostly used by foreigners, and hikkake-bashi ("the pulling bridge"), mostly used by native Japanese.

== In media ==
- The fictional location of Sotenbori, as depicted in SEGA's Yakuza series of video games, is based on Dōtonbori.
- One of the stages in SNK vs. Capcom: The Match of the Millennium takes place in Dōtonbori. It is always the first stage of the arcade mode.
- The Nudist Beach HQ in the anime Kill la Kill is located underneath the Dōtonbori canal. The robot suits used by them is also named after it.
- Dōtonbori, along with other areas within Osaka are featured in racing game Asphalt 9.
- It is featured in John Wick: Chapter 4.
- Most action sequences in the movie Gantz: O take place on and around Ebisu Bridge.

== See also ==
- Shinsaibashi
- Sōemonchō
- Amerikamura
- Tourism in Japan
