= Glico Man =

Neon sign in Dōtonbori, Osaka

The Glico Man sign as seen in October 2014

The Glico Man (グリコマン, Guriko Man), also referred to as the Glico Running Man, is a giant neon sign and billboard mounted above the Ebisubashi Bridge spanning the Dōtonbori canal in Dōtonbori district, Osaka, Japan. It depicts a runner with both arms raised as he crosses a finish line on a blue running track. The sign was erected by Japanese food processing company Ezaki Glico in 1935 to promote the company's caramel candy, which used the catchphrase "three hundred meters on a single piece," suggesting that the 300 calories the candy contains was enough to run the same length.

The Glico Man is considered to be a major tourist attraction in Dōtonbori and Osaka as a whole, with depictions of the sign being found on postcards and tourist advertisements. In 2014, the sign was installed with LED lights. It is the sixth major improvement to the sign since it was first installed.

In October 2026, Glico announced that the sign would temporarily shut down for maintenance and repairs, with the scheduled re-illumination in the spring of 2027.
