= Sōemonchō =

Sōemonchō 宗右衛門町
- District
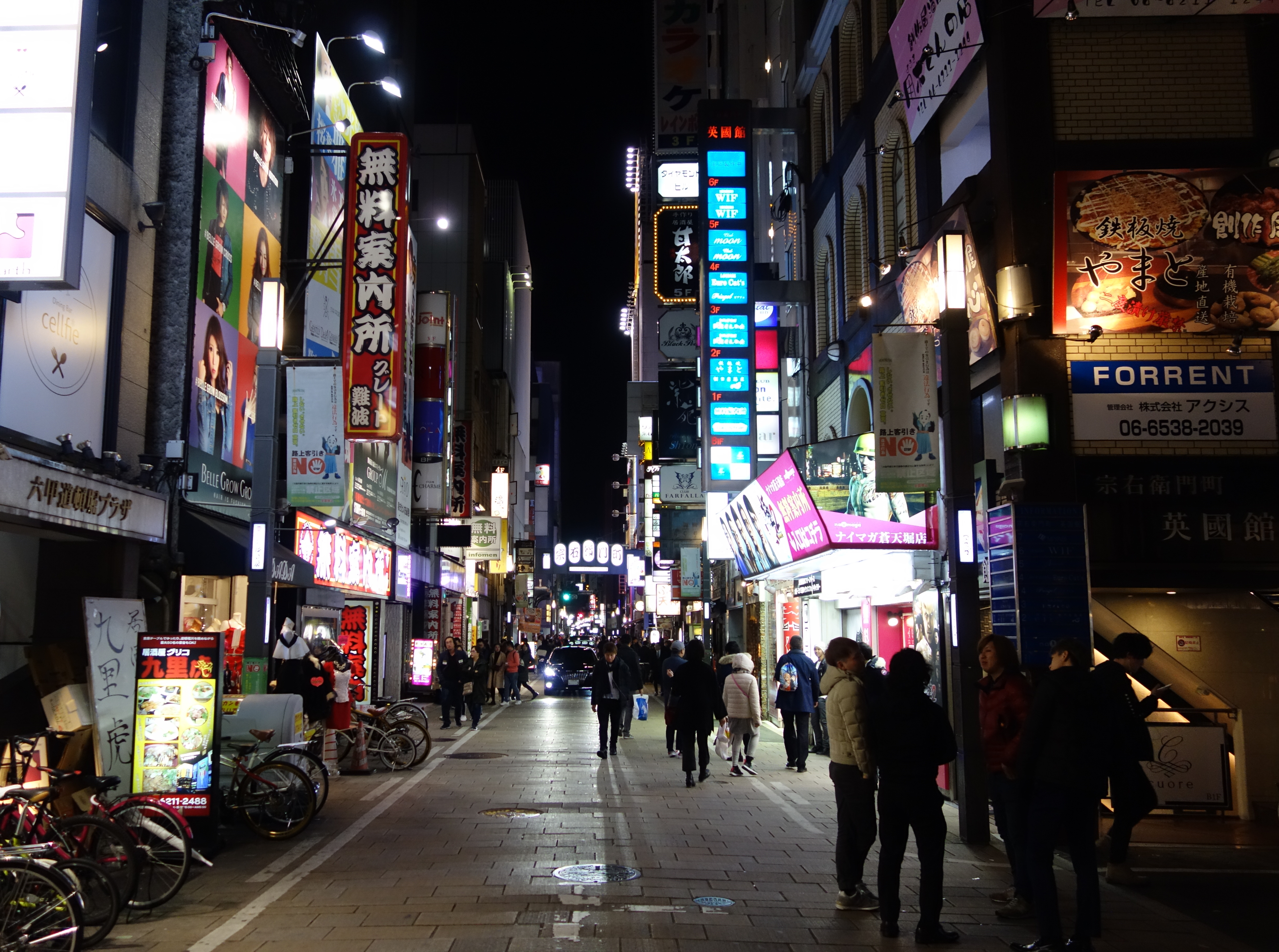
- Sōemonchō during the night
- Interactive map of Sōemonchō
- Coordinates: 34°40′11″N 135°30′15″E
- Country: Japan
- City: Osaka
- Post code: 542-0084

Sōemonchō or Soemonchō (宗右衛門町) is an entertainment district in Chūō-ku, one of the wards of Osaka, Japan. The district borders on two other entertainment districts, Shinsaibashi to the north and Dōtonbori to the south. Sōemonchō has a high concentration of bars, restaurants and nightclubs.

Sōemonchō is featured in the song "Sōemonchō Blues" (宗右衛門町ブルース) by Katsuji Heiwa and Dark Horse, which was released in 1972 and became a major hit in Japan, selling two million copies.

== See also ==
- Shinsaibashi
- Dōtonbori
