= Shinsaibashi =

Shinsaibashi 心斎橋
- District
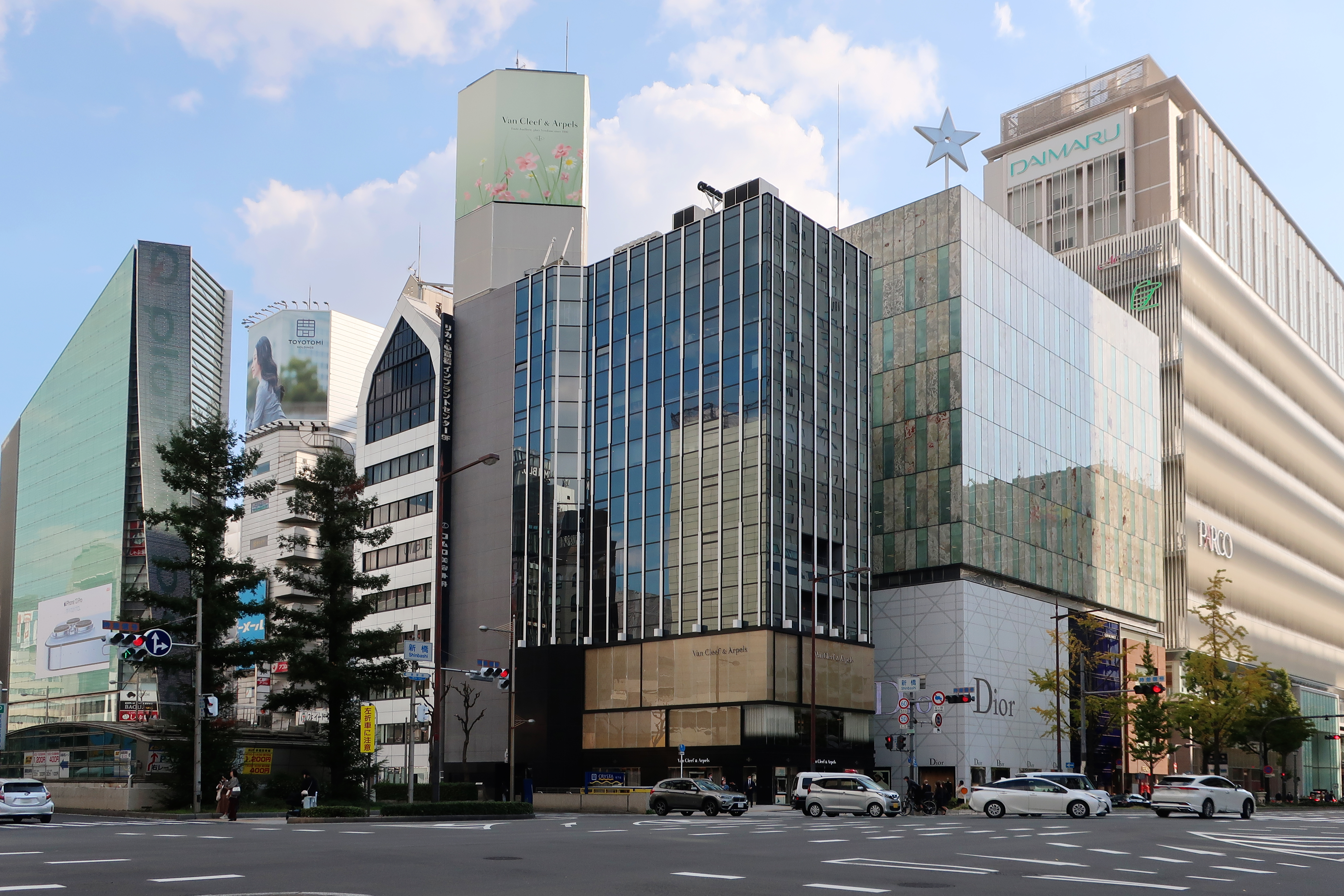
- Shinbashi intersection
- Interactive map of Shinsaibashi
- Country: Japan
- City: Osaka

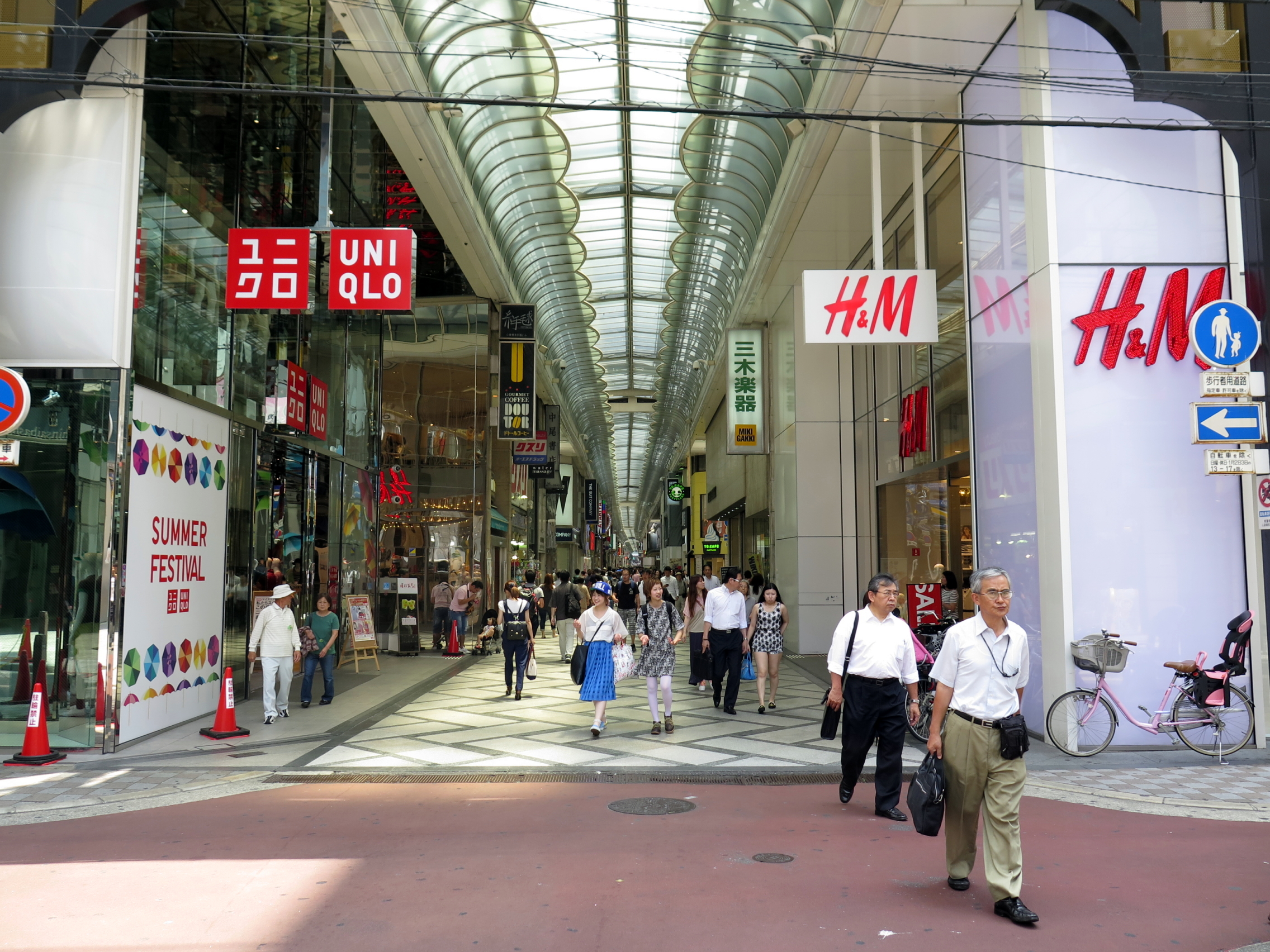
An afternoon in Shinsaibashi

Shinsaibashi (心斎橋) is a district in the Chūō-ku ward of Osaka, Japan and the city's main shopping area. At its center is Shinsaibashi-suji (心斎橋筋), a covered shopping street, that is north of Dōtonbori and Sōemonchō, and parallel and east of Mido-suji street. Associated with Shinsaibashi, and west of Mido-suji street, is Amerika-mura, an American-themed shopping area and center of Osaka's youth culture. Major stores and boutiques concentrates are found around the area. Shinsaibashi is easily accessed via the subway.

== History ==
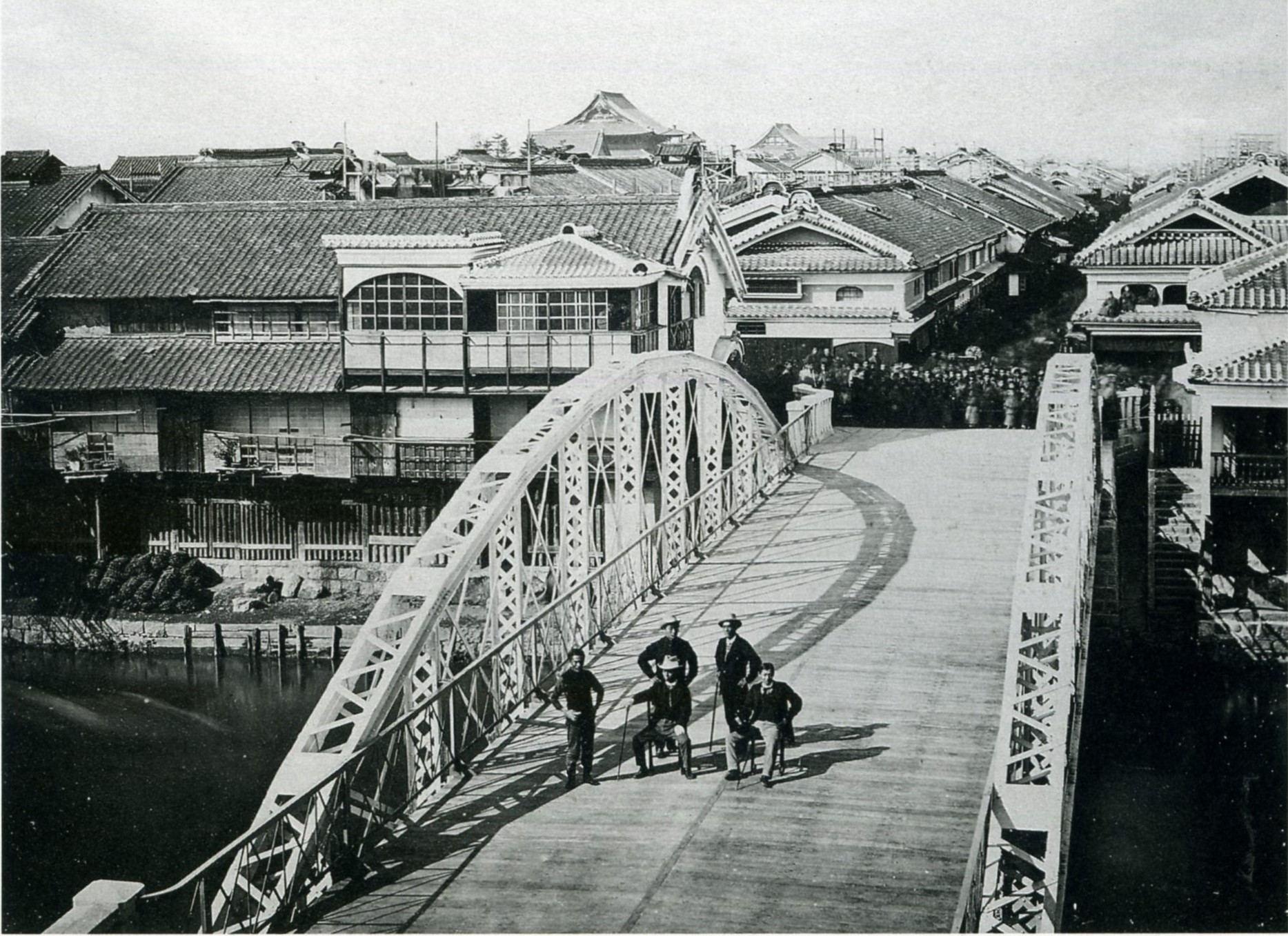
The Shinsaibashi bridge after 1873

Sidewalk bridge with railing and lamps from the stone Shinsaibashi bridge

Like many place names in Osaka, the Shinsaibashi shopping district gets its name from one of the many "Machi-bashi" (town bridges) that were built and managed by the local merchants. Shinsaibashi was a much-loved landmark bridge that spanned the Nagahori-gawa canal.

In 1622, at the time of the excavation of the Nagahori-gawa canal, the original 35 metres-long and 4 metres-wide wooden bridge was built by Shinsai Okada, one of the four merchants who dug the Nagahori-gawa canal. The bridge was named after its builder.

As the popularity of Shinmachi to the north and the Dōtonbori theatre district to the south increased, so did the popularity of the shops lining the streets connected by the bridge, establishing the area as Osaka's main shopping district.

The well-used wooden bridge required considerable maintenance and repairs by the townspeople who owned it. In 1873, the wooden bridge was replaced with a 37.1 metres-long and 5.2 metres-wide arched truss iron bridge that had been imported from Germany. The arched bridge was considered to be quite unusual, and became a popular topic of conversation amongst Osakans.

In 1909, accompanying the construction of a street car along the Nagahori-dori road, the iron bridge was replaced with Osaka's first stone bridge. It was a Western-styled, elegant double arched bridge with a row of four-leafed clovers carved into the railings. At night the bridge was illuminated by eight gas lamps. The bridge was affectionately nicknamed "Eyeglasses bridge" by the townspeople because, with the reflection of its two stone arches in the water, it looked like a pair of glasses.

In 1964, the Nagahori-gawa canal was reclaimed to become a road, the bridge taken down, and the carved railings and the lamps from the stone bridge were used in the construction of a pedestrian overpass. This bridge was used in one of the scenes in the 1989 Hollywood movie Black Rain.

The overpass was removed as a part of the construction of the Crysta Nagahori, an underground shopping mall beneath the Nagahori-dori road. The mall opened in 1997, and the lamps and part of the carved stone railing of the overpass were used for a sidewalk bridge above the mall. Water in the ceiling of the mall flows under the bridge.

In 1973, to commemorate its 100th anniversary, the German-made iron bridge was reconstructed; it is now a pedestrian overpass in Tsurumi Ryokuchi Park.

== Retail establishments ==
A busy crowd inside Shinsaibashi

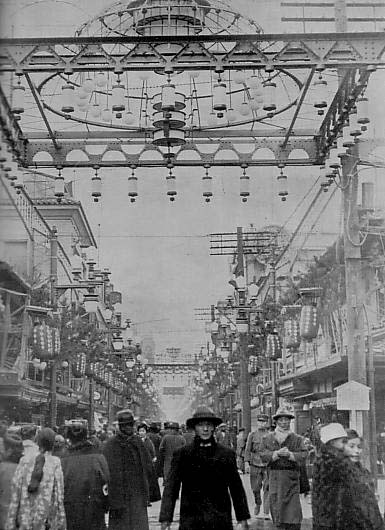
Shinsaibashi-suji in 1930s

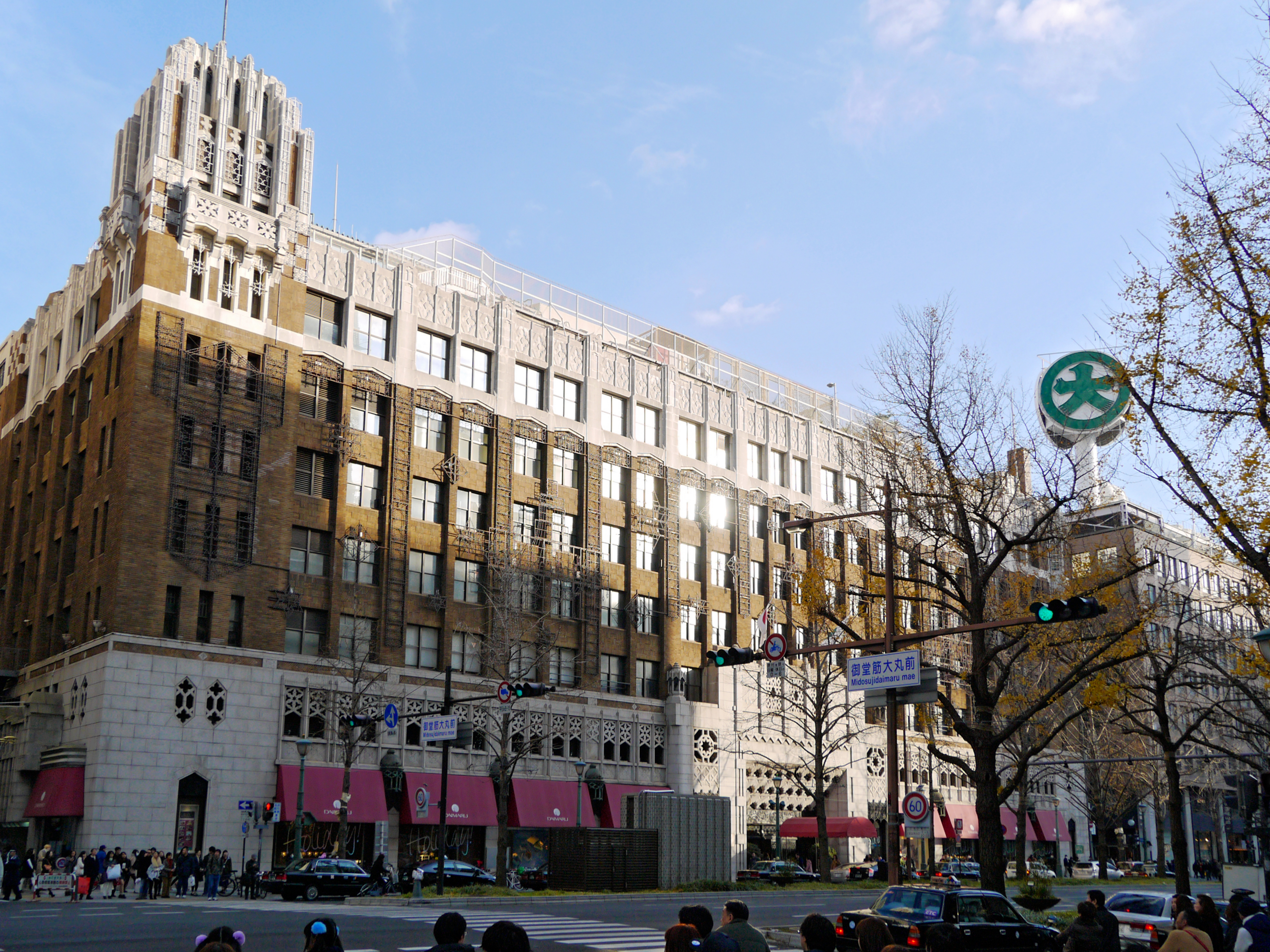
The main building and south wing of Daimaru Shinsaibashi

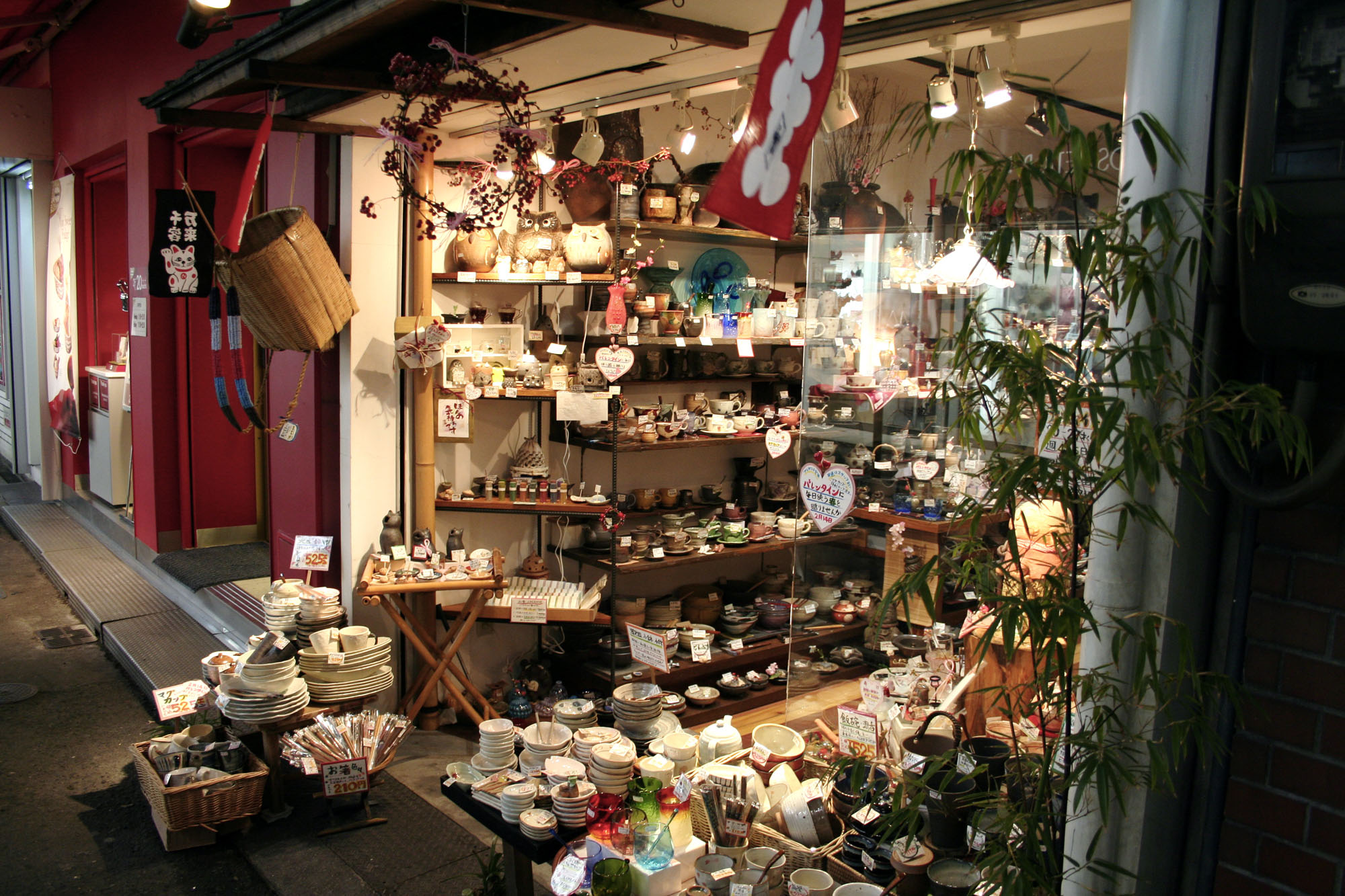
A ceramics store off the side of Shinsaibashi

- Daimaru
- PARCO
- Shinsaibashi-suji shopping arcade
- Shinsaibashi OPA, a fashion-oriented shopping mall that opened in 1994, permanently closed on January 12, 2026, after 31 years of operation.
- Tokyu Hands
- Apple Store
- Camera Naniwa
- Crysta Nagahori
- Shinsaibashi ZERO GATE
- Coach
- Dior
- Chanel
- Gucci
- Louis Vuitton
- Diesel
- Cartier
- Harry Winston
- Versace
- Armani
- Dolce & Gabbana
- Giorgio Armani
- Rolex
- Beams
- Hermès
- Omega
- Givenchy
- Yves Saint-Laurent
- Dunhill
- BVLGARI
- Fendi
- Samantha Thavasa
- Franck Muller
- Benetton
- Uniqlo
- Gap
- Ships
- United Arrows
- H&M
- Vivienne Westwood

== Osaka Metro stations ==
- Shinsaibashi Station - Midosuji Line (M19), Nagahori Tsurumi-ryokuchi Line (N15)
- Yotsubashi Station - Yotsubashi Line (Y14)

== Gallery ==
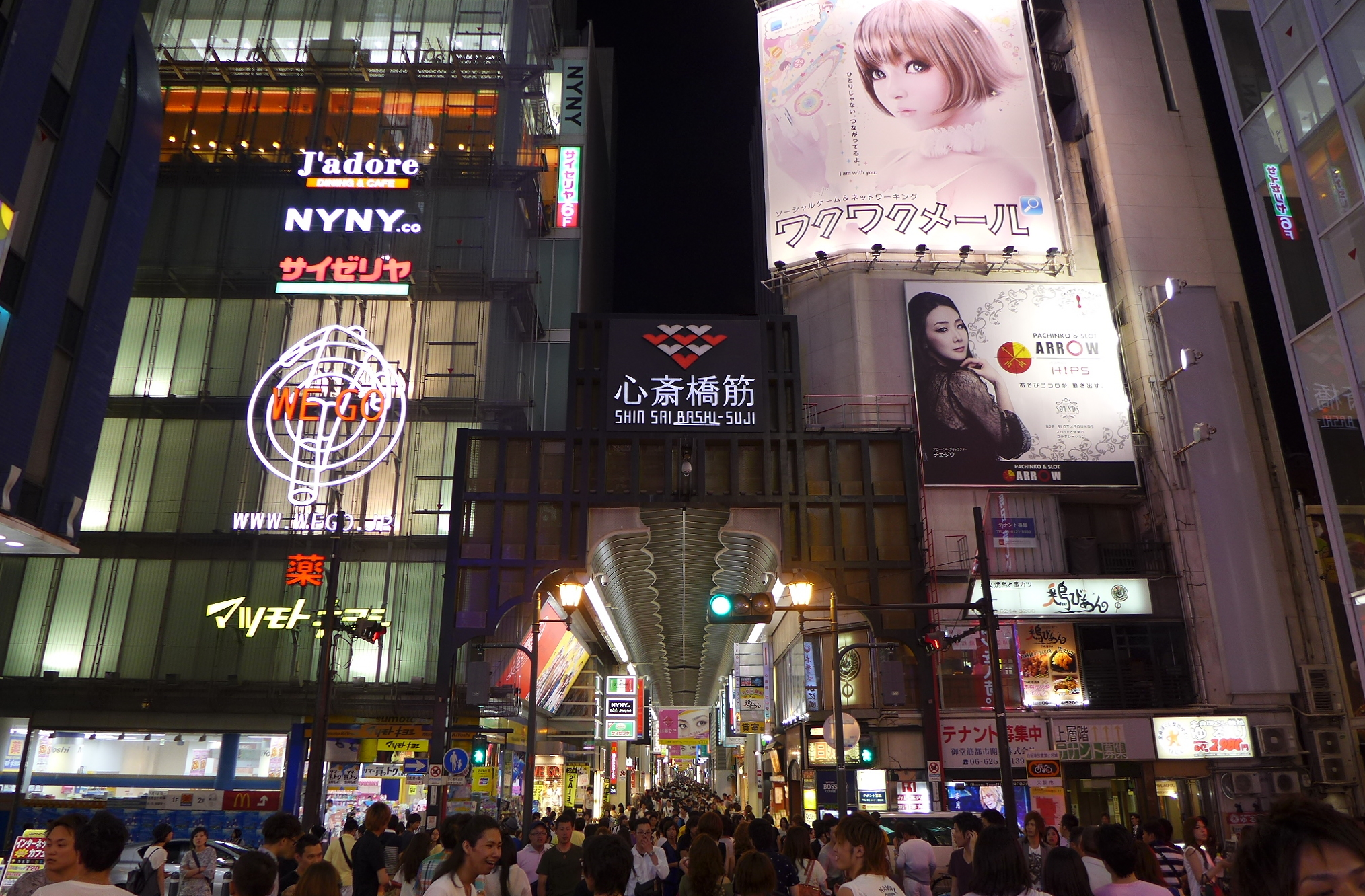
Shinsaibashisuji Gate night view

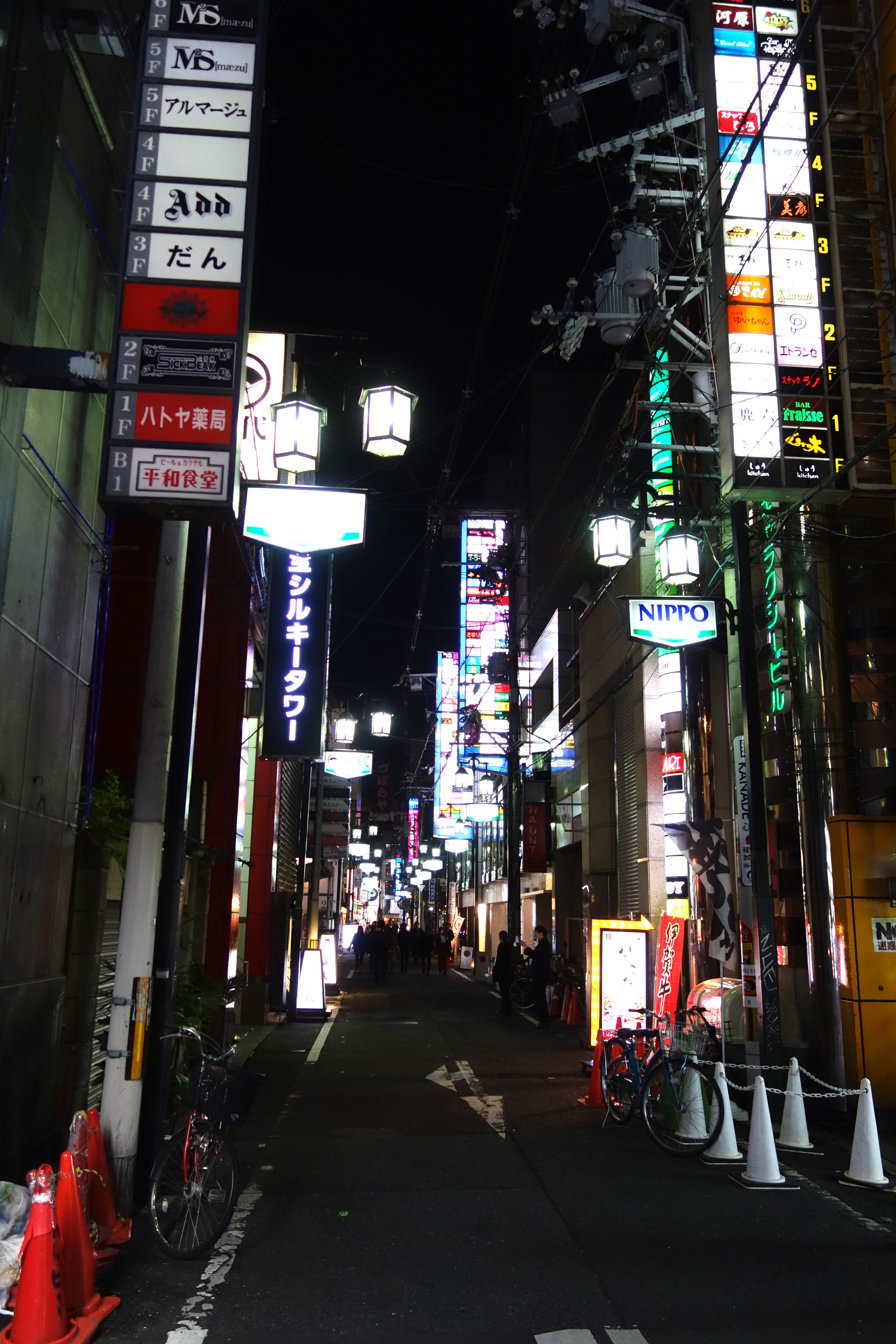
Shinsaibashi street (facing south)

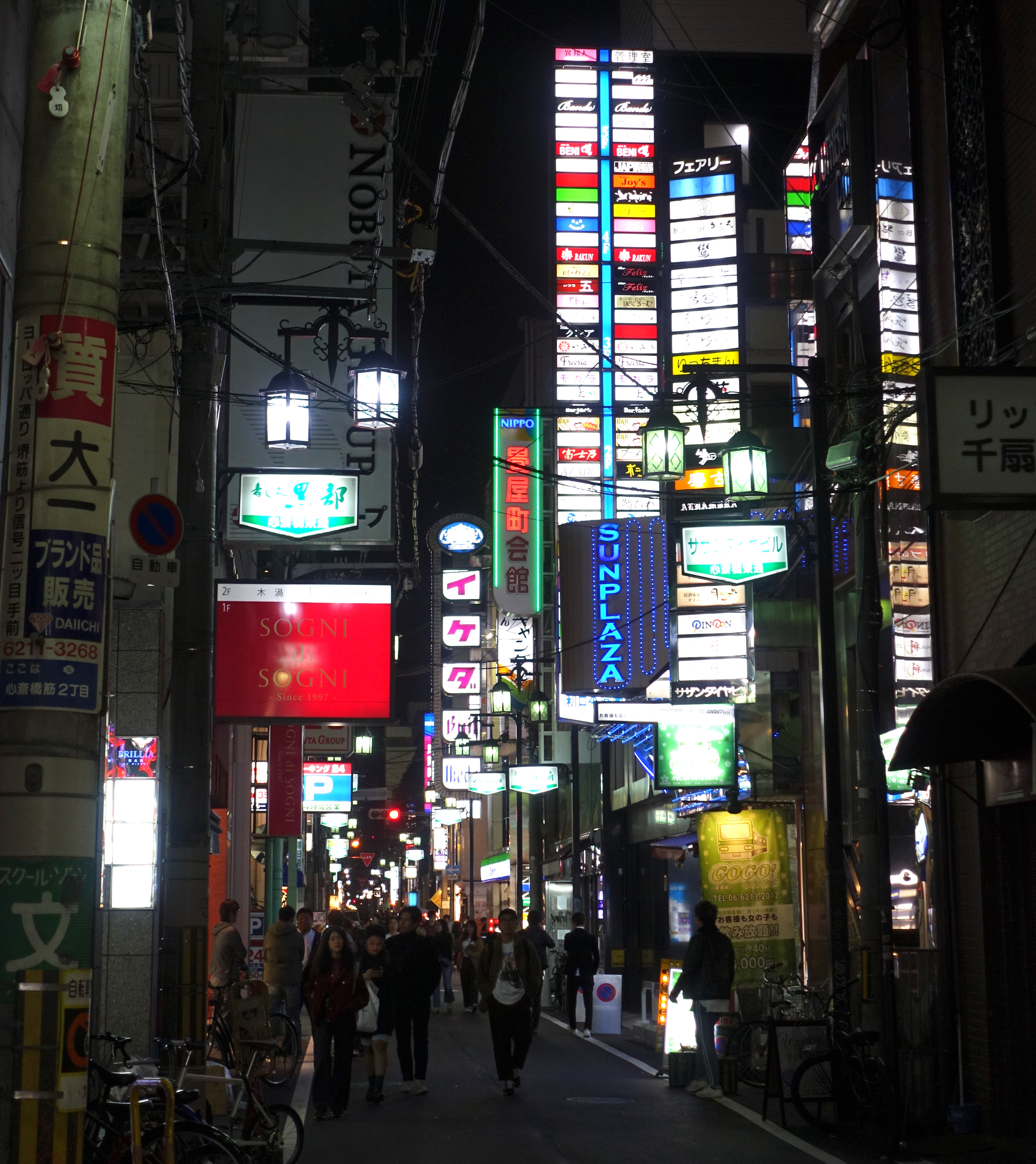
Shinsaibashi street (facing north)

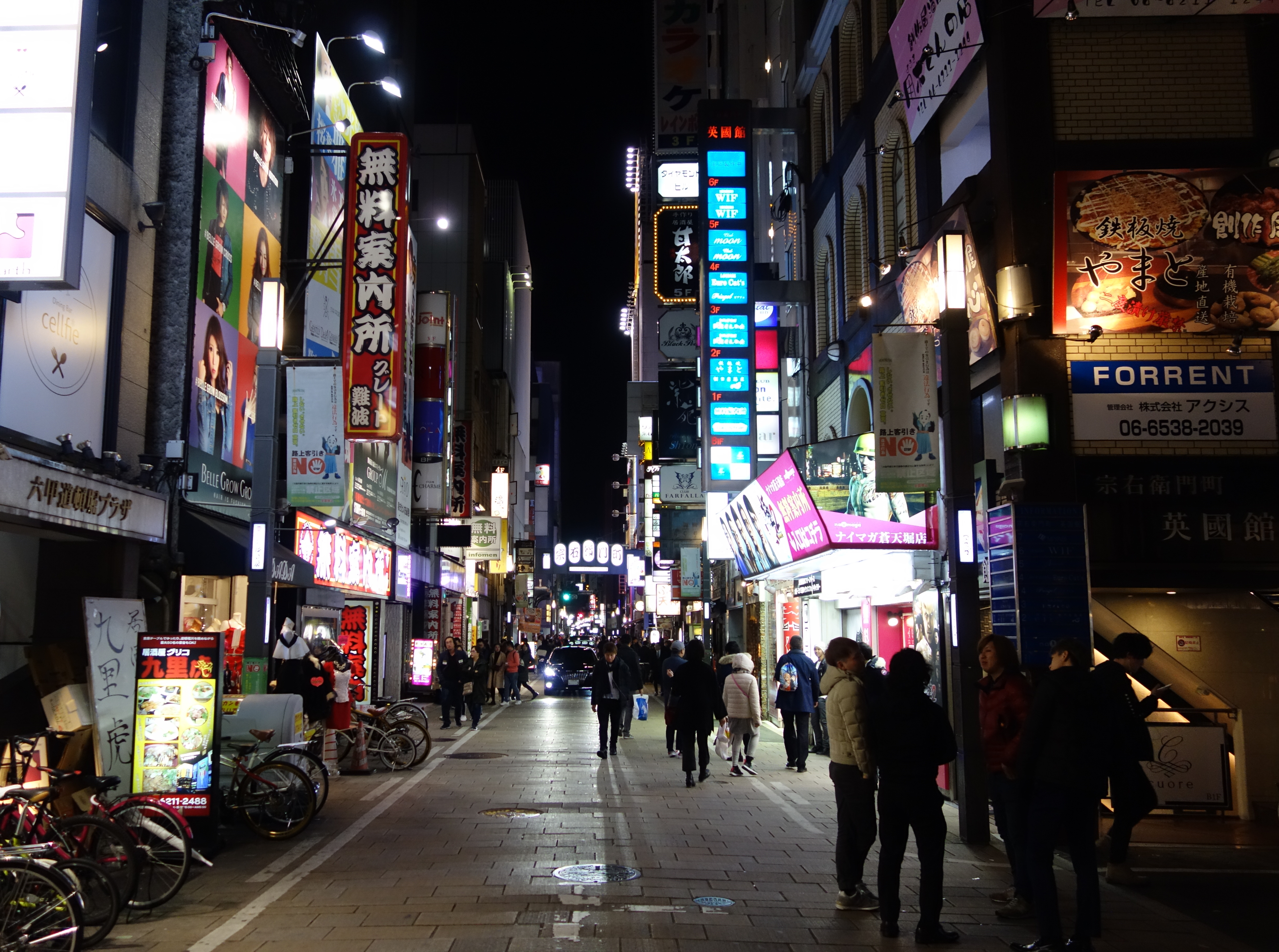
Border between Shinsaibashi and Sōemonchō

== See also ==
- List of upscale shopping districts
