= Kani Dōraku =

Japanese restaurant chain

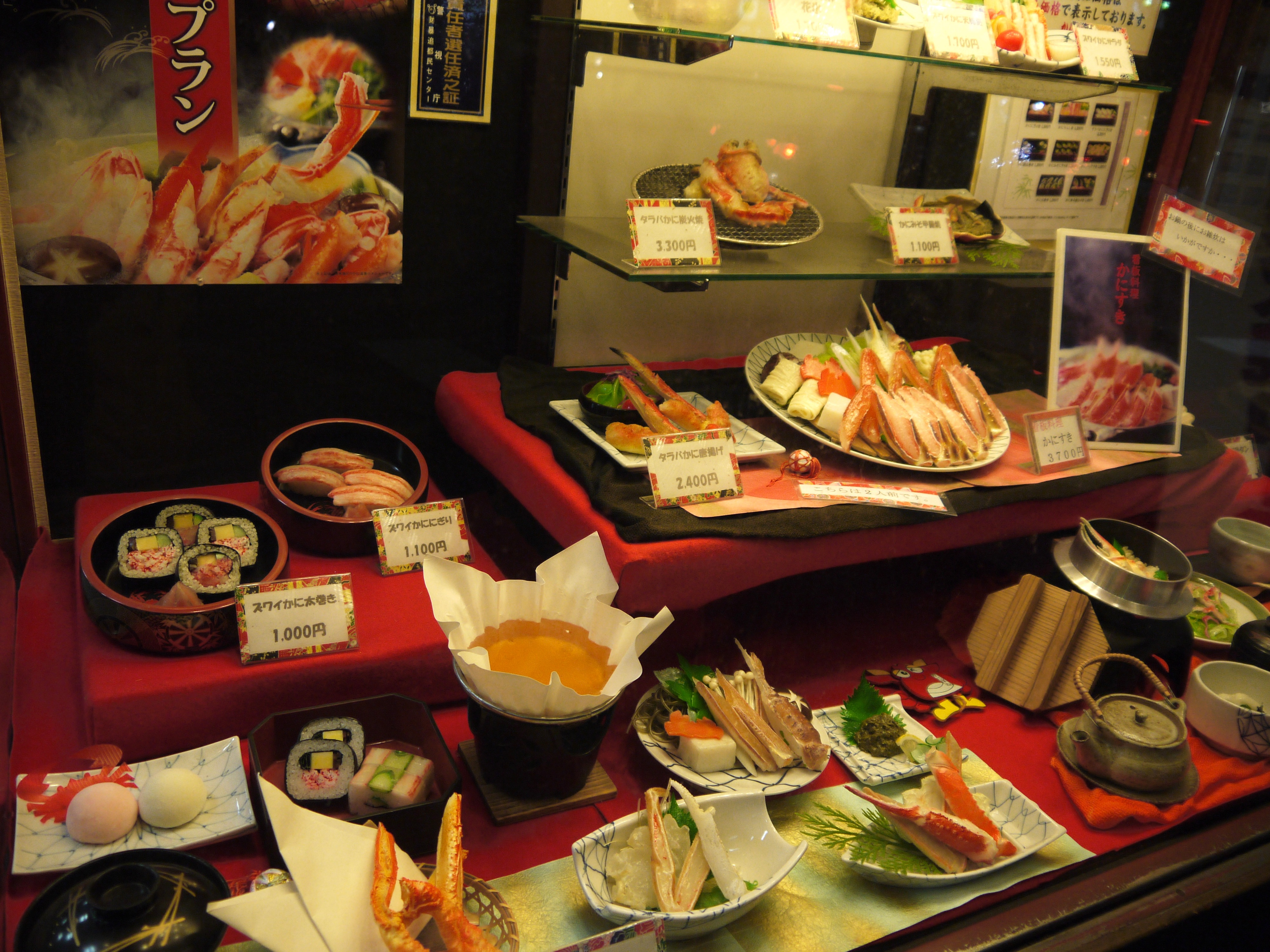
Window display with fake food

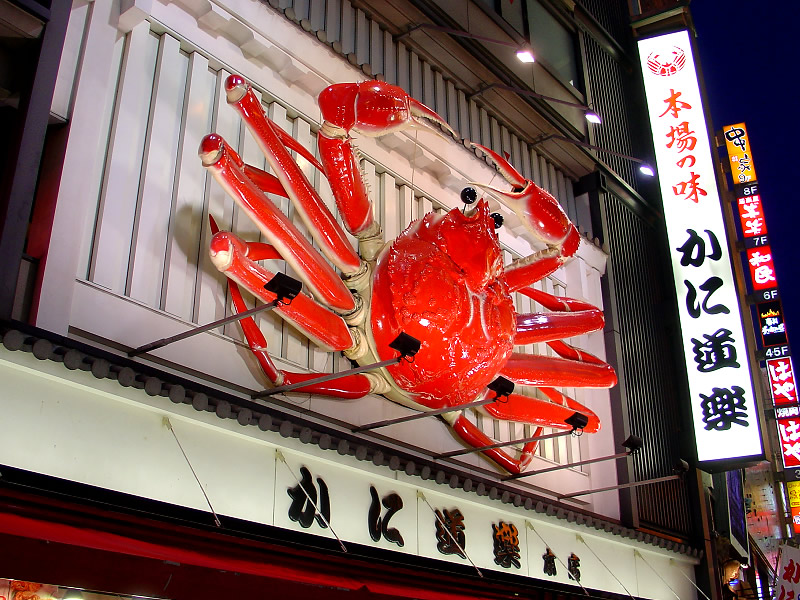
Iconic mechanical crab display that is emblematic of the chain

Kani Dōraku (かに道楽) is a Japanese restaurant chain that specialises in crustaceans and other seafood.

The restaurants are known for their traditional appearance and the large animatronic red crab above their main entrances.
