= 173rd =

173rd or 173d may refer to:

- 173d Air Refueling Squadron, unit of the Nebraska Air National Guard 155th Air Refueling Wing
- 173D Special Troops Battalion, combat engineer battalion of the United States Army headquartered in Italy
- 173rd (3/1st London) Brigade, formation of the British Army's Territorial Force that was raised in 1915
- 173rd Airborne Brigade Combat Team, airborne infantry brigade combat team of the United States Army based in Italy
- 173rd Special Operations Aviation Squadron, Australian Army helicopter squadron providing support to the Special Operations Command
- 173rd Battalion (Canadian Highlanders), CEF, unit in the Canadian Expeditionary Force during the First World War
- 173rd Division (People's Republic of China), created in February 1949
- 173rd Fighter Wing, unit of the Oregon Air National Guard, stationed at Kingsley Field Air National Guard Base
- 173rd meridian east, from the North Pole across the Pacific Ocean, New Zealand, the Southern Ocean, and Antarctica to the South Pole
- 173rd meridian west, from the North Pole across the Arctic Ocean, Asia, the Pacific Ocean, the Southern Ocean, and Antarctica to the South Pole
- 173rd New York State Legislature met from January 4, 1961, to March 31, 1962
- 173rd New York Volunteer Infantry, infantry regiment in the Union Army during the American Civil War
- 173rd Ohio Infantry, infantry regiment in the Union Army during the American Civil War
- 173rd pope, Pope Gregory VIII (1100–1187), reigned from 21 October to his death
- 173rd Rifle Division, infantry division of the Soviet Union's Red Army during World War II
- 173rd Support Battalion (United States), Combat Support Battalion of the United States Army based in Italy
- 173rd Tunnelling Company, in the Royal Engineers, created by the British Army during World War I
- Pennsylvania's 173rd Representative District, located in Philadelphia County

== See also ==
- 173
- 173 (number)
- 173 AD
- 173 BC
