= 173rd Regiment =

173rd Regiment may refer to:

- 173rd Field Regiment, Royal Artillery
- 173rd New York Infantry Regiment, Union Army
- 173rd Ohio Infantry Regiment, Union Army
- 173rd Pennsylvania Infantry Regiment, Union Army

== See also ==
- 173rd (disambiguation)
