= List of highways numbered 172 =

The following highways are numbered 172:

== Canada ==
- New Brunswick Route 172
- Prince Edward Island Route 172
- Quebec Route 172

== Ireland ==
- R172 road

== Japan ==
- Japan National Route 172

== United Kingdom ==
- A172 road
- B172 road

== United States ==
- Interstate 172 (former)
- Interstate 172
- Alabama State Route 172
- Arizona State Route 172 (former)
- California State Route 172
- Colorado State Highway 172
- Connecticut Route 172
- Georgia State Route 172
- Illinois Route 172
- Kentucky Route 172
- Louisiana Highway 172
- Maine State Route 172
- Maryland Route 172
- M-172 (Michigan highway) (former)
- Minnesota State Highway 172
- Mississippi Highway 172
- Missouri Route 172
- Nevada State Route 172
- New Jersey Route 172
- New Mexico State Road 172
- New York State Route 172
- North Carolina Highway 172
- Ohio State Route 172
- Pennsylvania Route 172 (former)
- South Carolina Highway 172
- Tennessee State Route 172
- Texas State Highway 172
  - Texas State Highway Loop 172
  - Texas State Highway Spur 172
  - Farm to Market Road 172 (Texas)
- Utah State Route 172
- Virginia State Route 172
- Washington State Route 172
- Wisconsin Highway 172
- Wyoming Highway 172

Territories:

- Puerto Rico Highway 172

Preceded by 171	Lists of highways 172	Succeeded by 173
