= 173rd Division =

173rd Division may refer to:

- 173rd Division (People's Republic of China)
- 173rd Rifle Division, Soviet Union

== See also ==
- List of military divisions by number
- 173rd Regiment (disambiguation)
- 173rd (disambiguation)
