= List of highways numbered 174 =

The following highways are numbered 174:

== Brazil ==
- BR-174

== Canada ==
- Ottawa Road 174
- Prince Edward Island Route 174

== Costa Rica ==
- National Route 174

== Ireland ==
- R174 road

== Japan ==
- Route 174 (Japan) (Japan's shortest national highway)

== United Kingdom ==
- A174 road
- B174 road

== United States ==
- Interstate 174 (proposed)
- Alabama State Route 174
- California State Route 174
- Connecticut Route 174
- Georgia State Route 174
- Illinois Route 174 (former)
- Kentucky Route 174
- Louisiana Highway 174
- Maine State Route 174
- Maryland Route 174
- M-174 (Michigan highway)
- Missouri Route 174
- New Jersey Route 174 (former)
- New Mexico State Road 174
- New York State Route 174
  - New York State Route 174X
- Ohio State Route 174
- Pennsylvania Route 174
- South Carolina Highway 174
- Tennessee State Route 174
- Texas State Highway 174
  - Texas State Highway Spur 174
  - Farm to Market Road 174
- Utah State Route 174
- Virginia State Route 174
- Washington State Route 174
- Wisconsin Highway 174 (former)
- Wyoming Highway 174

Territories:

- Puerto Rico Highway 174

Preceded by 173	Lists of highways 174	Succeeded by 175
