= Charles B. Morton =

American politician

Charles Beatty Morton (February 2, 1833 – January 16, 1922) was an American politician from New York.

== Life ==
Morton was born on February 2, 1833, in Troy, New York. He attended the Albany Academy from 1840 to 1849.

Morton moved to Brooklyn in 1855. He was a member of the Metropolitan Police Department from 1857 to 1861. In April 1861, when Abraham Lincoln first called for "three months' men" to fight in the American Civil War, he enlisted. After the three months expired, he promptly re-enlisted. He organized a company for the 13th Regiment of Brooklyn, served in the 47th Regiment of Brooklyn, and organized the 173rd New York Infantry Regiment. He became colonel of the latter regiment in 1862.

Morton was honorably discharged in 1863, at which point he became a recorder for the Board of Enrollment in the 2nd New York District. In 1866, he became the Deputy Auditor for the City of Brooklyn. In 1869, he became Chief Clerk of Internal Revenue for the 1st and 3rd Districts. In 1871, he was elected to the New York State Assembly as a Republican, representing the Kings County 7th District. He served in the Assembly in 1872.

Morton was Secretary of the New York City Police Department from 1875 to 1880, Assistant Postmaster of Brooklyn from 1877 to 1884, and an attache of the City Clerk's Office for over 20 years. He was a delegate to the 1894 New York State Constitutional Convention and a presidential elector for Charles Evans Hughes in the 1916 presidential election.

Morton was a member of the Grand Army of the Republic and the Freemasons. He was married to Harriet Lucinda Green.

Morton died at home from apoplexy on January 16, 1922. He was buried in Graham Cemetery in Hubbardsville.

New York State Assembly
Preceded by William Wainwright	New York State Assembly; Kings County, 7th District; 1872	Succeeded by Frederick Cocheu
