= 173rd Battalion (Canadian Highlanders), CEF =

- Active: 1916–1917
- Country: Canada
- Branch: Canadian Expeditionary Force
- Type: Infantry

Commanders
- Notable commanders: Lieut-Col. W. H. Bruce

The 173rd (Highlanders) Battalion, CEF, was a unit in the Canadian Expeditionary Force during the First World War. One of a number of Highlander battalions in the Canadian Expeditionary Force, it was based in Hamilton, Ontario, and began recruiting during the winter of 1915/16.

The unit sailed for England on November 14, 1916, on the RMS Olympic, with 32 officers and 950 other ranks. Of the 950 other ranks, 741 had attested with the 173rd, 145 with the 213th Battalion, CEF, and 32 with 23 different units.

On January 17, 1917, the 173rd arrived at Bramshott where on January 19 it became part of the 2nd Reserve Battalion of the 6th Reserve Brigade. The 2nd Reserve Battalion was designated to supply drafts for the 125th and 116th Battalions, CEF. The 173rd (Highlanders) Battalion had one Officer Commanding: Lieut-Col. W. H. Bruce.

The battalion has been perpetuated by the Argyll and Sutherland Highlanders of Canada since 1920.

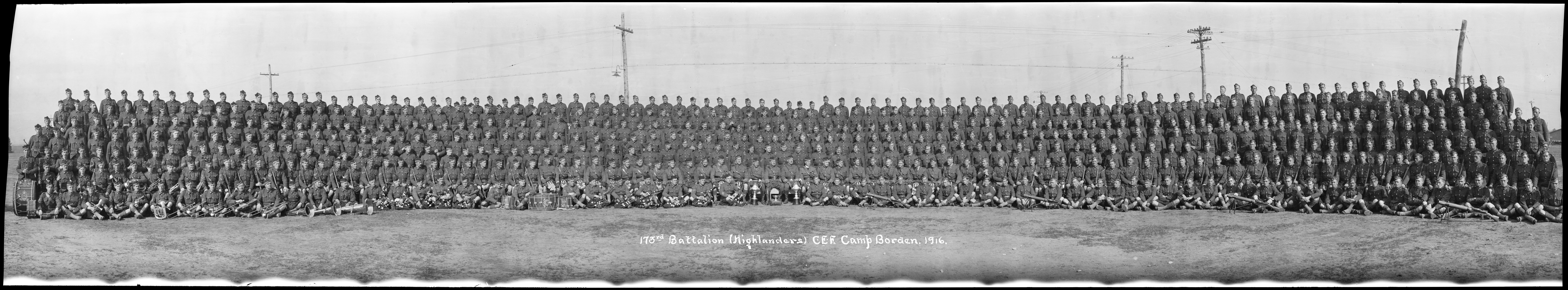
Group photo of 173rd Battalion at Camp Borden in 1916

== See also ==
- List of infantry battalions in the Canadian Expeditionary Force
- The Canadian Crown and the Canadian Forces
- Military history of Canada
- History of the Canadian Army
- Canadian Forces
