= Utah State Route 169 =

State Route 169

Location
- Country: United States
- State: Utah

Highway system
- Utah State Highway System; Interstate; US; State; Minor; Scenic
← SR-168	→ SR-170

Utah State Route 169 may refer to:

- Utah State Route 169 (1977-1990), a former state route in the Ogden Valley in eastern Weber County, Utah, United States, that connected Utah State Route 162 (now Utah State Route 158) at a junction in the Wasatch-Cache National Forest (north of the Pineview Reservoir) with Utah State Route 166 (now Utah State Route 162) in Eden
- Utah State Route 169 (1962-1977), a former state highway designation (legislative overlay) for the section of U.S. Route 89/U.S. Route 91 in Salt Lake and Davis counties in Utah, United States, that ran between the Interstate 15 Becks interchange in northern Salt Lake City and the Interstate 15 in north Bountiful
- Utah State Route 169 (1935-1953), a former state highway in the Heber Valley in northern Wasatch County, Utah, United States, that ran east from Utah State Route 6 (U.S. Route 40/U.S. Route 189) in Heber City along East Center Street to Lake Creek (a former settlement that is now part of Heber City)

== See also ==
- List of state highways in Utah
- List of highways numbered 169
