= List of highways numbered 171 =

Route 171, or Highway 171, may refer to:

== Canada ==
- Prince Edward Island Route 171
- Quebec Route 171

== Costa Rica ==
- National Route 171

== Ireland ==
- R171 road

== Israel ==
- Route 171 (Israel)

== Japan ==
- Japan National Route 171

== Korea, South ==
- Expressway 171
  - Osan–Hwaseong Expressway
  - Yongin–Seoul Expressway

== United Kingdom ==
- A171 road

== United States ==
- U.S. Route 171
- Alabama State Route 171
- Arkansas Highway 171
- California State Route 171 (former)
- Connecticut Route 171
- Florida State Road 171 (former)
- Georgia State Route 171
- Illinois Route 171
- K-171 (Kansas highway)
- Kentucky Route 171
- Maine State Route 171
- Maryland Route 171
- M-171 (Michigan highway)
- Minnesota State Highway 171
- Missouri Route 171
- Nevada State Route 171
- New Hampshire Route 171
- New Jersey Route 171
- New Mexico State Road 171
- New York State Route 171
- North Carolina Highway 171
- Ohio State Route 171
- Oklahoma State Highway 171
- Pennsylvania Route 171
- South Carolina Highway 171
- Tennessee State Route 171
- Texas State Highway 171
  - Business State Highway 171-E (Texas)
  - Texas State Highway Loop 171
  - Farm to Market Road 171
- Utah State Route 171
- Virginia State Route 171
- Washington State Route 171
- Wisconsin Highway 171
- Wyoming Highway 171

Territories

- Puerto Rico Highway 171

Preceded by 170	Lists of highways 171	Succeeded by 172
