= Charles Davidson Dunbar =

British military musician

Charles Davidson Dunbar, DCM (17 July 1870 – 25 January 1939) was the first pipe major to be commissioned as a pipe officer in Britain and the British Empire. He emigrated from Scotland to Canada, where he came to be called "Canada's greatest military piper".

== Background ==
According to the official record of his birth, he was born on 17 July 1870, to an unmarried needlewoman, Alexandrina Leith Miller, who lived on Bridge Street in the Caithness village of Halkirk, in northern Scotland. His father was Charles Dunbar of Halkirk, according to a family letter.

Though Alexandrina Miller was poor, she was sufficiently educated to teach Charles to read and made sure he attended the Parish School. In later records, he used the name Charles Dunbar and, subsequently, Charles Davidson Dunbar, perhaps to honour his half-brother, Alexander Davidson. He gave his father's name as William Dunbar on both his entrance records to industrial school and his marriage license.

Only one William Dunbar appears to have lived in Halkirk at the time of Charles' birth, the lessee of Braal "Brawl" Castle. But there are no documents that directly link this William Dunbar with Alexandrina Miller or her son Charles. No baptismal record has been found and William Dunbar's will does not mention Charles or his mother.

When Alexandrina Miller died on 8 September 1876, in Halkirk, she was identified as a single woman aged 48. Her parents were James Miller, a crofter, and Margaret, whose maiden name was Henderson. The cause of her death, certified by John Craven, physician and surgeon, was phthisis pulmonary (tuberculosis) and chronic rheumatism. Her daughter, Charles' half-sister, Margaret H. Budge, was present at her death.

Charles was then just six years old, and the only child still living with his mother. It appears he then stayed with at least one of his half-siblings in Halkirk for several years before being taken to Edinburgh and registered at the original Ragged School by his half-brother, Alexander Davidson, who had recently become a policeman in Edinburgh. He entered the school on 13 September 1879; according to the school's records, he could read but could not write. He was to be detained at the school until he turned 16. The Rev. Dr Thomas Guthrie's original Ragged School – later called the "Industrial School" – had been established in 1847 in Ramsay Lane as an orphanage, primarily for boys. The building still exists, at the top of Castlehill on the Royal Mile, near Edinburgh Castle, and is now part of the Camera Obscura attraction.

Thomas Guthrie, a preacher and reformer, had been a leader in the formation of the Free Church of Scotland and a keen advocate of "Ragged Schools." His Edinburgh school educated, fed, and provided a home for 45 of the Old Town's most destitute children. Boys were taught how to make shoes and clothes, and the girls to be 'thrifty wives for working men." Here, Charles Dunbar learned to write and was trained as a carpenter. It appears that it was during his time at the school that he learned to play the bagpipes. Not all of the school's records are available for public review and it is not known whether the school provided piping tuition or he received it privately.

== British Army ==
Discharged from the school on 1 May 1886, two months before his 16th birthday, Charles Dunbar set his sights on joining the military. He enlisted with the Seaforth Highlanders as a piper on 6 October 1886. He stood only 5 feet 3 inches tall – probably the result of a scanty diet during his childhood – but it was often said of him that he appeared taller than he was because of his stance and demeanor. Fraser's Scottish Annual records that "he was fortunate that the commander of the Seaforth Highlanders at that time was Colonel Guinness, an officer who took exceptional pride in the efficiency of his pipe band".

"Colonel Guinness saw once that here was a keen, ambitious, stripling of parts, and although scarcely the age for enlistment, Dunbar being just 16, was allowed to try the piping tests and although these were fairly hard, set as they were for men of from 18 to 21 years of age. Dunbar passed very creditably and was taken on the strength of the regiment and posted to the pipe band. It was a proud day for the slim, fair-haired boy when he went through the 'piper's initiation' and was fitted out with a uniform, a kit and a full sized bagpipe and the ivory-mounted 'feadan' (chanter) placed in his hands by a kindly pipe sergeant with the words: 'Ye ken, my lad, the auld word, 'learn young, learn fair. Ye're young enough, in all conscience, but gin ye wish to gang far, ye'll hae to wark hard and keep at it. Guid luck tae ye, my boy'."

After service in Scotland and Ireland, he transferred to the 3rd Royal Scots on 1 January 1894 and after just a year's service with his new regiment, he became a candidate for the pipe major's position with the Second Battalion of the Gordon Highlanders.

Selection was by competition – open to Army pipers and outsiders. William Dunbar won in a keen contest and, on 11 February 1895, formally joined the Second Battalion. He was promoted to sergeant piper and assumed the duties of pipe major on 3 March.

The regiment was quartered at Maryhill Barracks and was commanded by Colonel Oxley, who was succeeded by Colonel Dick Cunningham, VC. According to the historian Robert Fraser: "This promotion was recognition of his stature within the army as a piper. Already in 1893 he was performing full pipe programmes of marches, strathspeys, and reels. That year he established himself as a piper of the first rank, at Inverness. He had acquired a reputation as an obliging, trustworthy, honest, and able soldier. In May 1895, he completed his second class Army Certificate which gave him a good elementary education He was stationed in Scotland in 1895 and 1896."

While his regiment was in Scotland, he met Margaret Dolina Murray, affectionately called "Maggie". They were married on 39 April 1896, in Edinburgh. Their marriage certificate identifies Charles Dunbar as "Pipe Major, Guard in Highlanders, bachelor"; and Margaret Murray as a domestic servant and spinster. The document also lists Charles' father as William Dunbar, general merchant, deceased, and his mother as Alexandrina Dunbar (Miller), deceased; the marriage was witnessed by William A. Murray (Margaret's brother) and his fiancé Mary Hill.

Soon afterwards, the Second Battalion was moved to Aldershot where Margaret gave birth to the couple's first son – William Charles Dunbar – on 8 May 1897. That same year, Charles Dunbar played for Queen Victoria when she visited the camp to inspect the Highlanders.

=== Boer War ===
Within two years, the new family was on board ship with the regiment to India – where a second son, Colin Murray Dunbar, was born on 3 January 1900 but not before Pipe Major Charles Dunbar was posted away to South Africa to serve in the Boer War, his first experience in action. The Second Battalion was one of the first units ordered to South Africa, where it won numerous battle honours.

At the Battle of Elandslaagte on 21 October 1899, Charles Dunbar piped the Gordons into battle. He was wounded in the head but continued to lead the troops onwards: conduct under fire for which he was awarded the Distinguished Conduct Medal (DCM), a decoration for valor second only to the Victoria Cross. On three further occasions he was cited for bravery, including at the celebrated Relief of Ladysmith on 28 February 1900. Whilst still in South Africa, he transferred to the Third Battalion of the Gordon Highlanders on 23 July 1901. Often in action, he earned six clasps for the ribbon of his South Africa medal, each representing a significant battle. At Pretoria, with other Highland pipers, he also won a prize for piping, presented to him by Lord Kitchener.

Following the war, the Gordons returned to Scotland and Charles Dunbar and his family took up life in Aberdeen. His reputation as a piper steadily grew. He was an instructor for the Aberdeen Amateur Piper's Society and often played at for parades and marches, and at Highland games. He won the Beatty silver cup, a competition open to pipers of the Highland regiments, and, in 1905, was awarded Good Conduct and Long Service Medals.

It was during his time in Aberdeen that he was given the set of silver-mounted pipes which had been bought for him by Colonel Dick-Cunningham, of the Gordons, who had been killed in South Africa. (These pipes, along with their original leather case, and his entire regalia including his uniform, kilt, medals and photos, were deposited on permanent loan with the Argyll and Sutherland Regimental Museum in Hamilton on 7 May 2000, by descendants of Charles Dunbar.)

Two more sons were born to Charles and Maggie Dunbar in Aberdeen: George, on 8 January 1906, and Percy Gordon on 10 January 1909.

== Canada ==
Meanwhile, Charles Dunbar was still corresponding with Canadians he had met and served with in South Africa, at their urging, he decided to leave the Army after 24 years of service and emigrate to Canada. In 1911, the family arrived in Hamilton, Ontario, where, shortly afterwards, their last child, a daughter they named Margaret ("Peggy") was born.

Charles Dunbar joined a cartage business owned by one of Hamilton's leading families, Hendrie and Company, as a clerk. The company was a pickup and delivery service using Clydesdale horses pulling flat, platform wagons that collected shipments at the railways and delivered supplies and freight to the surrounding communities. Charles Dunbar was regarded as a loyal and valued employee. The Dunbars lived at 18 Hilton Street in Hamilton. Small by today's standards for a family of seven, it was a home that remained in the family's ownership until a few years before their daughter Margaret's death in 2004.

A piper of renown, Charles came to the attention of the 91st (later the Argyll and Sutherland Highlanders of Canada, Princess Louise's). He was asked by senior officers of the regiment to join them and on 15 September 1913, he enlisted as pipe major. It is reported that he was also approached by the 48th Highlanders of Toronto but Charles Dunbar was unwilling to supplant James Fraser who was the regiment's serving pipe major.

Charles Dunbar taught his sons to play the pipes, though none attained his mastery of the instrument.

Maggie Dunbar found time to become active in the Red Cross and church activities at St. Paul's Presbyterian Church. Charles Dunbar's life revolved around his work, his family, the regiment and the pipe band. He had high standards and was an excellent teacher although it is reported that many of his piping students had a difficult time meeting his exacting standards. Sydney Featherstone and John Knox Cairns were two of his students who did excel, and they went on to succeed him.

== World War I ==
At the outbreak of the First World War, Sergeant Dunbar was one of the first to enlist – on 24 September 1914, as a staff sergeant. He traveled to Valcartier, Quebec, and, on his arrival there, wired his wife to let her know what had transpired and have her send on his belongings. He went to France with Colonel William Hendrie who was in command of the Canadian remount depot. From France, Charles Dunbar he did a tour of duty in England, during which he secured a transfer to the 19 Battalion (91st unit) of the Canadian Expeditionary as pipe-major and immediately took command of the pipe band.

Again, he volunteered to pipe the troops into battle. The advent of trench warfare and the machine gun made charges led by pipers very dangerous. In Belgium and France, he and his corps piped their battalion to Ypres and to the battlefront of the Somme. During the Battle of the Somme, fighting at Courcelette on 14 September 1916, Pipe Major Dunbar was seriously wounded in the stomach and left leg by shrapnel. After many months of recuperation in England, he returned to Hamilton on 4 July 1917, and immediately re-joined the 91st Canadian Highlanders.

On 6 January 1915, while he had been stationed on Salisbury Plain in England, Dunbar had been recommended for an officer's commission. On 7 November 1917, he was commissioned as a lieutenant. His commission was unique; he was the first pipe-major in the history of British and Canadian forces to hold a commission while retaining command of a pipe band. He held his position as pipe-officer of the 91st Canadian Highlanders regimental pipe band until his retirement in 1937.

== Post-War service ==
Under his leadership, the band gained an international reputation and won many awards. Charles Dunbar oversaw the recruitment, training and outfitting of his pipers. He was known for his devotion to duty and his influence in shaping young soldiers in the traditions of duty and service. He also won numerous prizes and medals for his piping and his dancing during the 1920s – in Canada, Britain and the United States. At Pictou, Nova Scotia, in 1923, he won three championship prizes at events commemorating the 150th anniversary of the landing of the first Highlanders. He won premier honours at Buffalo, New York and Toronto; and, at the first Highland games held at Banff, Alberta, he carried off the gold medal for piobaireachd and the Ian Beattie Silver Cup, along with $100 in prize money. His most outstanding successes included winning the strathspey and reel competitions at Oban and Inverness in Scotland. At Banff, Alberta, in Canada, he won a gold medal for piobaireachd. Back home in Hamilton, he commanded the band that played for the Duke of Windsor, the future King Edward VIII, when he visited the city as Prince of Wales in 1919. He also was one of the pipers selected to play for the Governor General of Canada, Viscount Byng of Vimy, at a special dinner on 15 April 1925.

His last parade was in 1936. His list of medals included the Distinguished Conduct Medal, the Volunteer Decoration, the Victory Medal, the South Africa 1899-1901 Medal, the Mons Star 1914–1915, Service Medal 1914–1918, Allies Medal, King George V Jubilee Medal, Efficiency Decoration, Imperial Long Service Decoration and the Canadian Long Service Decoration.

Upon his retirement as pipe-officer in 1937, Charles Dunbar was honoured by the Argyll and Sutherland Highlanders (Princess Louise's) with a banquet at which he was presented with a silver tea set as a token of appreciation for his years of service. At his retirement, he referred to Colonel John I. McLaren, the late Lieutenant-Colonel W. W. Stewart and to Colonel James Chisholm as having persuaded him to move to Canada and join the regiment.

Speeches were made by Lieutenant-Colonel McLaren, his Officer Commanding in France; Colonel James Chisholm, who termed him "the successor to the MacCrimmons of Skye"; Colonel C. W. Gibson and many other officers who commended his example, in obedience to the call of duty, as a characteristic that had been the making of the British Empire. He was described as a "a soldier and a Highland gentleman in the highest terms."

Captain William Hendrie, who was at the retirement function, recounted how, when Charles Dunbar was wounded at the Somme, a silver plate from the bass drone of his pipes was lost. Years later, when Charles Dunbar went to the French river, to visit the summer home of the Hendries, the local station master asked if Lieutenant Dunbar was with them, and handed him the silver plate, picked up by his son on the battlefield.

William Hendrie also said Charles Dunbar had been a piper for the Duke of Connaught when he was Governor-General of Canada, and played for him on many occasions in Hamilton and Toronto. "His Royal Highness liked to hear some of the old marches which he had heard in the Army, such as Benachie, Dumbarton's Drums, The 74th's Farewell to Edinburgh and The Barren Rocks of Aden".

Charles Dunbar had been in poor health for some time but his death on 25 January 1939, just two years after retiring from the regiment, was unexpected. At the time of his death he was known to be the only commissioned pipe major in the British Empire. In his lifetime his regiment, the Argylls, recognized his importance. One of his commanding officers called him "as fine a type of officer as can be found in the Canadian Militia today"; another referred to him as "one of the most important officers that this unit possesses." Major Archie Cairns recalled that the "only time I ever saw my father weep, was when he first learned that his friend and mentor Charlie Dunbar was dead."

His funeral service at St Paul's Presbyterian Church in Hamilton was fitting for a pipe major. The church was filled to capacity, and a large crowd lined the streets to watch the cortege pass. Pipe Major Syd H. Featherstone played The Death of the Chief as the casket was borne from the church. The unusually large pipe band which followed the escort and the firing party consisted of the pipers of the 48th Highlanders of Toronto, the Argyll and Sutherland Highlanders, the Toronto Scottish Regiment, the St. Catharine's band, and the veterans of the 19th Battalion from Hamilton, Toronto and Brantford.

Charles Dunbar was buried with full military honors at the family plot in Woodland Cemetery, Hamilton, Ontario, overlooking Lake Ontario. His casket was adorned with his officer's bonnet and broadsword. At the cemetery, the firing party fired three volleys over the grave, the pipers of the Argyll and Sutherland Highlanders playing the Church Call between each volley. The lament he had so often played in honour of departed comrades now sounded for him.

An Ontario Heritage Plaque dedicated in his honour was unveiled on 18 September 1983 at a ceremony at Dundurn Castle in Hamilton and was later affixed to the wall of the Argyll and Sutherland Highlanders of Canada Armoury at 200 James Street North.

== Sources ==
- The Dictionary of Hamilton Biography Vol II, 1876–1924
- Historian Robert Fraser, who has written a pamphlet about Dunbar's military history and directed a tribute to Charles Davidson Dunbar in the Argyll and Sutherland Highlanders Museum in Hamilton, Ontario, Canada
- The National Archives of Scotland; Gail Inglis, archive assistant, North Highland Archive, Wick Library, Wick, Scotland; Gordon Johnson, genealogist; newspaper articles
- Fraser's Scottish Annual of 1928.

== Memorial ==
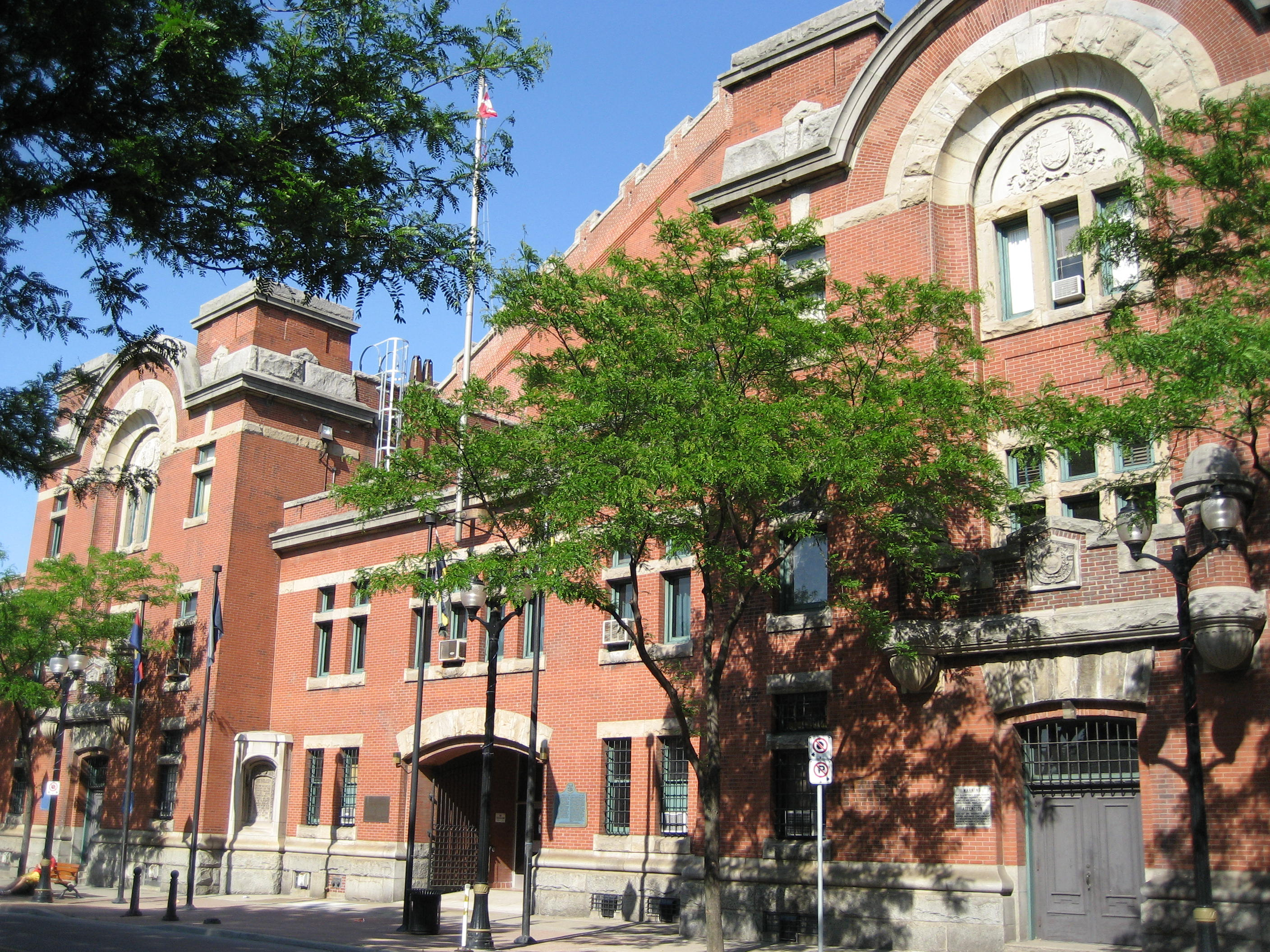
John Weir Foote VCA Armouries

A plaque commemorating Lieutenant Pipe Major Charles Dunbar, DCM, 1870-1939 is displayed on the wall of the John Weir Foote VCA Armouries on the east side of James Street North in Hamilton, Canada."An internationally renowned piper, Dunbar was born in Halkirk, Scotland. In 1886, he joined the British Army, embarking upon a distinguished career as a military piper. During the Boer War, Dunbar was wounded while piping troops into battle. For his gallantry he was awarded the Distinguished Conduct Medal. In 1911 he emigrated to Hamilton where he soon joined the 91st (later the Argyll and Sutherland Highlanders of Canada (Princess Louise's). As pipe-major of the 19th Battalion, he saw action during the First World War. Widely respected for his devotion to duty and gentlemanly demeanour and acclaimed as a musician and bandsman, Dunbar received many honours. Unique among them was his appointment as lieutenant in 1917, the first pipe-major to become a pipe-officer in the history of Canadian and British forces."
