= List of highways numbered 169 =

The following highways are numbered 169:

== Canada ==
- Prince Edward Island Route 169
- Quebec Route 169

== Costa Rica ==
- National Route 169

== India ==
- National Highway 169 (India)

== Ireland ==
- R169 road

== Japan ==
- Japan National Route 169

== United Kingdom ==
- A169 road
- B169 road

== United States ==
- Interstate 169 (Kentucky)
- Interstate 169 (Texas)
  - Interstate 169 (Tennessee) (former proposal)
- U.S. Route 169
- Alabama State Route 169
- Arizona State Route 169
- Arkansas Highway 169
- California State Route 169
- Connecticut State Route 169
- Florida State Road 169 (former)
- Georgia State Route 169
- Illinois Route 169
- Kentucky Route 169
- Louisiana Highway 169
- Maine State Route 169
- Maryland Route 169
- Massachusetts Route 169
- M-169 (Michigan highway) (former)
- U.S. Route 169 in Minnesota
- Nevada State Route 169
- New Jersey Route 169 (former)
- New Mexico State Road 169
- New York State Route 169
- Ohio State Route 169
- Tennessee State Route 169
- Texas State Highway 169
  - Texas State Highway Spur 169
- Utah State Route 169 (former)
- Virginia State Route 169
- Washington State Route 169
- Wisconsin Highway 169

Territories

- Puerto Rico Highway 169

Preceded by 168	Lists of highways 169	Succeeded by 170
