= List of highways numbered 170 =

The following highways are numbered 170:

== Canada ==
- New Brunswick Route 170
- Prince Edward Island Route 170
- Quebec Route 170

== Costa Rica ==
- National Route 170

== Japan ==
- Japan National Route 170

== United Kingdom ==
- A170 road
- B170 road

== United States ==
- Interstate 170 (Missouri)
- Interstate 170 (Maryland) (former)
- U.S. Route 170 (former)
- Alabama State Route 170
- Arizona State Route 170 (former)
- Arkansas Highway 170
- California State Route 170
- Colorado State Highway 170
- Georgia State Route 170 (former)
- Illinois Route 170
- K-170 (Kansas highway)
- Kentucky Route 170
- Louisiana Highway 170
- Maine State Route 170
- Maryland Route 170
- M-170 (Michigan highway) (former)
- Nevada State Route 170
- New Jersey Route 170 (former)
- New Mexico State Road 170
- New York State Route 170
  - New York State Route 170A
- Ohio State Route 170
- Pennsylvania Route 170
- South Carolina Highway 170
- Tennessee State Route 170
- Texas State Highway 170
  - Texas State Highway Loop 170
  - Farm to Market Road 170
- Utah State Route 170 (former)
- Virginia State Route 170
- Washington State Route 170
- Wisconsin Highway 170
- Wyoming Highway 170

Territories

- Puerto Rico Highway 170

Preceded by 169	Lists of highways 170	Succeeded by 171
