= Utah State Route 170 =

State Route 170

Location
- Country: United States
- State: Utah

Highway system
- Utah State Highway System; Interstate; US; State; Minor; Scenic
← SR-169	→ SR-171

Utah State Route 170 may refer to:

- Utah State Route 170 (1992-1993), a former state highway in northwestern Sevier County, Utah, United States, that connected Utah State Route 24 (south of Aurora) with U.S. Route 50 (about 3.5 miles [5.6 km] west of Scipio), via Aurora, and was renumbered Utah State Route 260 in 1993. (From 1955 to 1969 this roadway had also been designated as Utah State Route 256.)
- Utah State Route 170 (1935-1969), a former state highway in the Cache Valley in Cache County, Utah, United States, that connected Utah State Route 142 in Trenton with Utah State Route 1 (U.S. Route 91) in Richmond and was added to Utah State Route 142 in 1969

== See also ==
- List of state highways in Utah
- List of highways numbered 170
