= List of highways numbered 173 =

The following highways are numbered 173:

== Canada ==
- Prince Edward Island Route 173
- Quebec Route 173

== India ==
- National Highway 173 (India)

== Ireland ==
- R173 road

== Japan ==
- Japan National Route 173

== Korea, South ==
- Iksan–Pyeongtaek Expressway Branch

== Philippines ==
- National Route 173 (Philippines)

== United Kingdom ==
- A173 road
- B173 road

== United States ==
- Alabama State Route 173
- Arizona State Route 173 (former)
- California State Route 173
- Connecticut Route 173
- Florida State Road 173
- Georgia State Route 173
- Illinois Route 173
- Iowa Highway 173
- K-173 (Kansas highway)
- Kentucky Route 173
- Louisiana Highway 173
- Maine State Route 173
- Maryland Route 173
- M-173 (Michigan highway) (former)
- Missouri Route 173
- New Jersey Route 173
- New Mexico State Road 173
- New York State Route 173
- Ohio State Route 173
- Oregon Route 173
- Pennsylvania Route 173
- South Carolina Highway 173
- Tennessee State Route 173
- Texas State Highway 173
  - Texas State Highway Loop 173
  - Farm to Market Road 173 (Texas)
- Utah State Route 173
- Virginia State Route 173
- Washington State Route 173
- Wisconsin Highway 173
- Wyoming Highway 173

Territories

- Puerto Rico Highway 173

Preceded by 172	Lists of highways 173	Succeeded by 174
