= 173 =

173 may also refer to:

- 173 BC
- AD 173
- 173 (number), the natural number following 172 and preceding 174
- UFC 173
- 173 Ino
- Radical 173
- Kosmos 173
- SCP-173
- Route 173, a list of highways referred to as 173
