= John Rennie (GC) =

Recipient of the George Cross

John Rennie GC
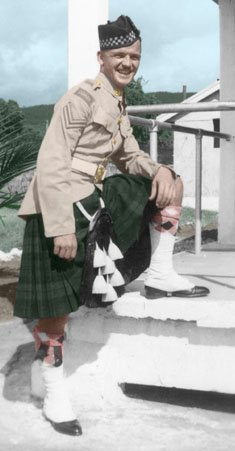
- Born: 13 December 1920; Aberdeen, Scotland
- Died: 29 October 1943 (aged 22); Riddlesworth, Norfolk, England
- Burial place: Brookwood Military Cemetery, Surrey
- Military career
- Allegiance: Canada
- Branch: Canadian Army
- Rank: Acting Sergeant
- Nickname: Jock
- Unit: The Argyll and Sutherland Highlanders of Canada (Princess Louise's)
- Awards: George Cross

Acting Sergeant John Rennie, GC (13 December 1920 – 29 October 1943) was posthumously awarded the George Cross for the gallantry he displayed in protecting others after a training accident at Riddlesworth in Norfolk on 29 October 1943.

Serving with The Argyll and Sutherland Highlanders of Canada (Princess Louise's), he was overseeing a grenade throwing drill when a live grenade rolled back into the trench his men were in. He pushed another man out of the way, picked up the grenade and attempted to throw it to safety as it exploded. He was mortally wounded but, by his sacrifice, had protected his comrades from the explosion. "Jock" Rennie was born in Aberdeen in Scotland in 1920 and had emigrated with his family to Kitchener, Ontario as a child.

== Plaque ==
A plaque in his honour is displayed on the wall of the John Weir Foote VCA Armouries on the east side of James Street North in Hamilton, Ontario, Canada. "Jock Rennie was awarded the George Cross posthumously in May 1944 for an instinctive, selfless act of heroism. Born in Aberdeen, Scotland, he came to Ontario with his family as a child and grew up in Kitchener, Ontario. Rennie enlisted in The Argyll and Sutherland Highlanders of Canada (Princess Louise's) at Hamilton, Ontario in July 1940, and went overseas with them to England in the summer of 1943. On October 29, 1943, he was supervising a grenade-throwing exercise near Riddlesworth when a live grenade fell back into the trench. Rennie pushed one of his men aside and tried to throw the grenade clear. At that moment it exploded. His body shielded others from harm, but he died of his injuries."

He was buried in the Commonwealth War Graves Commission Brookwood Military Cemetery in Surrey, United Kingdom.

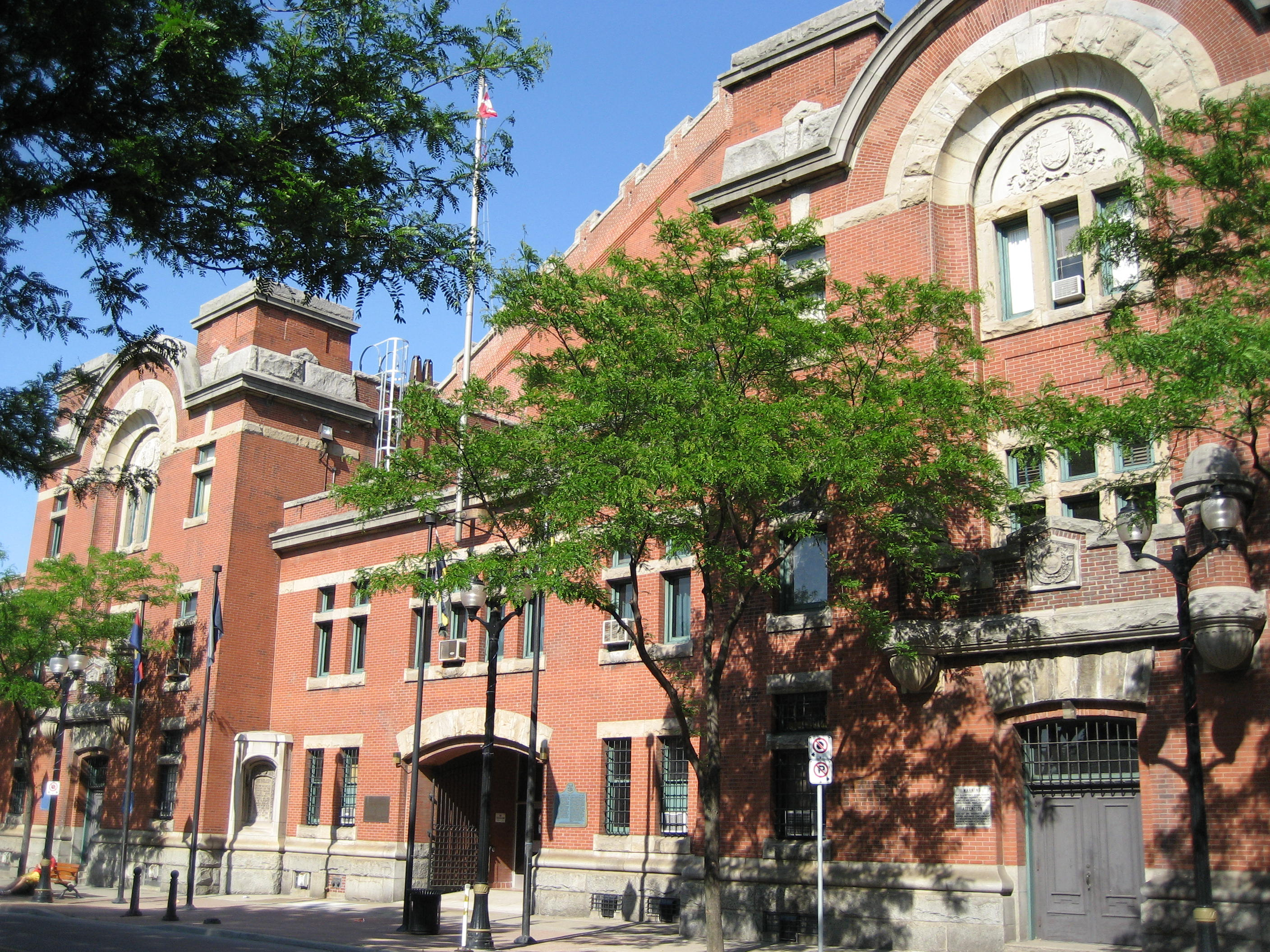
John Weir Foote VCA Armouries

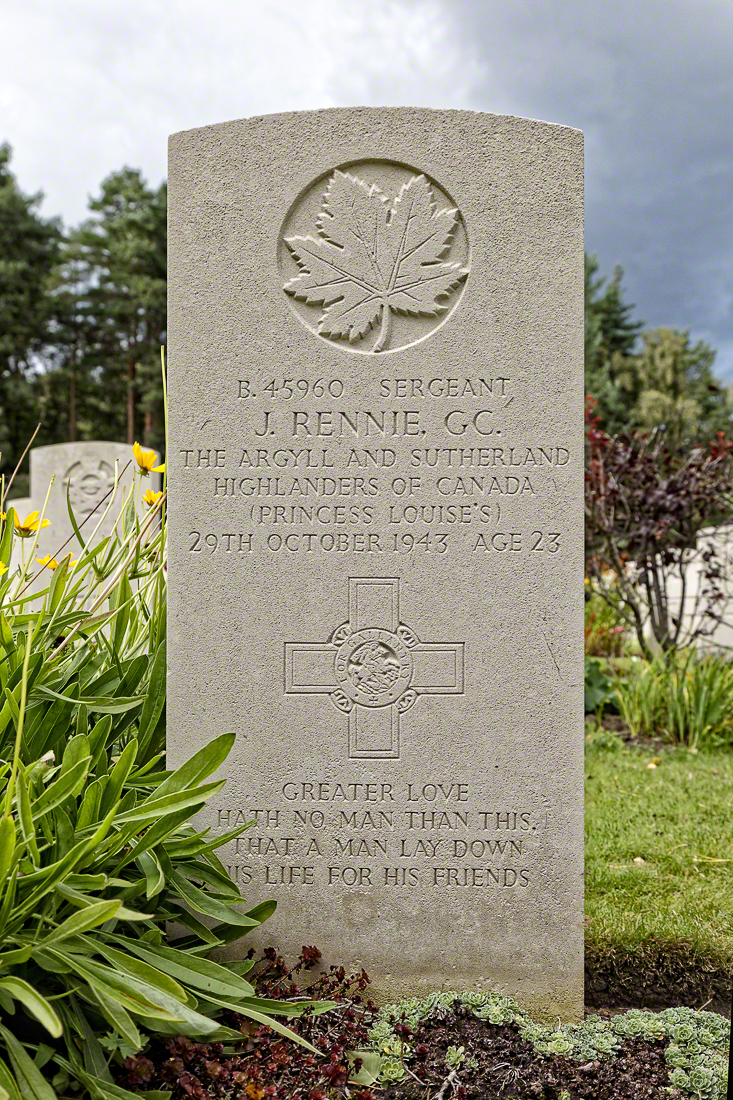
Rennie's CWGC gravestone in Brookwood Military Cemetery
