= Argyll and Sutherland Highlanders of Canada (Princess Louise's) =

The Argyll and Sutherland Highlanders of Canada (Princess Louise's)
- Cap badge of the regiment
- Active: 16 September 1903–present
- Country: Canada
- Branch: Canadian Army
- Type: Light Infantry
- Size: 1 battalion
- Part of: 31 Canadian Brigade Group
- Garrison/HQ: Hamilton, Ontario
- Nickname: The Argylls
- Motto: Albainn gu brath (Scottish Gaelic for 'Scotland forever')
- March: Quick: "The Campbells Are Coming"; B Company: "The Black Bear"
- Engagements: First World War: Somme 1916; Vimy 1917; Passchendaele; Ypres 1917; Second World War: Falaise; The Scheldt; War in Afghanistan
- Battle honours: See #Battle honours
- Website: Official website; www.argylls.ca

Commanders
- Colonel-in-chief: Vacant
- Honorary colonel: Col Glenn De Caire, OOM
- Honorary lieutenant-colonel: LCol Shendal Yalchin
- Commanding officer: LCol Adam MacInnis, CD
- Regimental sergeant major: CWO Davide Calconi, CD

Insignia
- Tactical recognition flash
- Tartan: Sutherland

The Argyll and Sutherland Highlanders of Canada (Princess Louise's), or A & SH of C, is a Primary Reserve Highland infantry regiment of the Canadian Armed Forces, based at John W. Foote VC Armoury in Hamilton, Ontario. The regiment is part of 2nd Canadian Division's 31 Canadian Brigade Group. The regiment was formed in 1903 as "91st 'Highlanders'", and since 1920 "Princess Louise's" has been part of the regimental title, for Princess Louise, Duchess of Argyll. On 24 May 2026 the regiment formed a tactical grouping with the Royal Hamilton Light Infantry (Wentworth Regiment) as part of the Canadian Army modernization.

== Badge ==
"A torteau charged with a leopard's face Or and environed by a wreath of thistles proper, overall an annulus Azure edged and inscribed 'Argyll and Sutherland' and 'Canada' in letters Or surmounted in chief by the Royal Crown proper and in base by two scrolls Azure edged and inscribed 'Albainn' and 'gu-brath' in letters Or."

== Foundations ==
The idea for a full Highland regiment in Hamilton first took shape among the members of the St. Andrew's Society (of which James Chisholm was the long-time treasurer) and the Sons of Scotland (of which, he was also a member). Late in 1902 meetings were held and prominent members of the city's Highland-Canadian community were asked to "take hold of the matter."

James Chisholm and his partner, William Alexander Logie (a captain in the XIII Regiment), took a leading role in organizing locally and in lobbying Ottawa. With the support of local Scottish organizations and clan societies, a deputation was sent to Ottawa bearing a petition to the minister of Militia. The minister, Frederick Borden, was less than enthusiastic about the potential cost and the Highland character of the proposed unit (he wanted the militia in a common uniform). Col. W. D. Otter, whom Logie canvassed for his opinion, was skeptical of the group's ability to "get either the officers or the men and if we got both [of] these we could not get the money …"

Hamilton's Scottish-Canadian elite moved quickly to fill the ranks of the officer corps and to raise the necessary funds to outfit the regiment in full Highland dress. Those who came forward included: Chisholm, Logie, J. R. Moodie, Walter W. Stewart, E. M. Dalley, Roy Moodie, E. F. Lazier, John Inglis McLaren, and many others from all walks of professional and business life.

A draft letter written by either Chisholm or Logie to local MPs noted that the proposed "officers are a fine lot of fellows and of good standing and large influence in the community." The group obtained (as of 25 March 1903) over 700 names for the rank and file. The "men are a particularly fine class drawn chiefly from the better class of Scotchmen who own their own homes and have a stake in the community." Chisholm and Logie were well-connected within the Liberal Party and maintained steady pressure upon local politicians to forward the group's cause. Chisholm monitored all communications with Borden. When the minister curtly informed a local lawyer to forward his support of the proposed Highland regiment "through the regular official channel," Chisholm promptly asked the minister of Militia for an explanation particularly as Borden had already written to Chisholm indicating that a Highland regiment would be raised. Borden denied having done so but by 17 August 1903 he reported (confidentially to Logie) authorizing the establishment of a Highland regiment. Chisholm, Logie, and the Scottish community were unrelenting and in the end won the day.

The regiment was formed on 13 September 1903 and gazetted three days later as the 91st Regiment Canadian Highlanders.

== Regimental history ==
=== Early days ===
In winning the day, Chisholm and Logie used every reasonable tactic at hand. They were particularly adept at putting pressure at the highest possible level, usually the minister, thus circumventing the normal channels of the Department of Militia and Defence. They continued this newly established tradition after the regiment was formed. When they wrote to the minister in 1904 concerning an account of $9.55 for plumbing in the officers' quarters, an exasperated senior aide wrote to Logie suggesting that "your Regiment should come into line . . . ." He went on to say, "It would be simply impossible to run this Department if other Regiments went about these matters as yours does." Nothing, however, changed. When in 1906 the Department of Customs insisted upon charging duty upon a snuff mull sent to the 91st by the British Argylls, Logie and Chisholm appealed to Chisholm's friend, Adam Zimmerman, MP, who took up their case with the Assistant Commissioner of Customs. A compromise was eventually reached.

Chisholm began his service with the 91st on 16 September 1903 as its paymaster holding the rank of honorary captain. For the rest of his life, the regiment was a significant part of his life. Logie served as the regiment's first commanding officer until 1911 so for a time Chisholm and Logie's office on James Street was an alternate battalion headquarters. Two evenings a week, Chisholm could be found at the James Street Armouries – the 91st was quartered in the recently built addition (designed in part by his architect brother-in-law Walter Wilson Stewart, also a member of the 91st). As well as the matters of weekly administration, there was an endless round of ceremonial functions and Chisholm took and maintained a interest in the Pipe Band. Finally, the 91st provided a rich social life in the officers' mess, whether the normal course of socializing after weekly parades, full mess dinners, special functions, balls, or the annual celebration of Hogmanay.

In 1904, when Douglas Cochrane, 12th Earl of Dundonald was still a General Officer Commanding the Militia of Canada, he was appointed an honorary colonel of the 91st Highlanders division, a title he held briefly before he was dismissed on the same year, which the dominion cabinet described as "Indiscretion and insubordination". Douglas became angry and argued with ministers at a dinner at Montreal, an argument which Douglas alleged that; ".. important parts of his reports for 1902 and 1903 were wrongfully suppressed by the minister of militia, contrary to his wishes. Sir Frederick Borden is charged by Lord Dundonald with falsehood in the house of commons. He declares the militia has been greatly neglected and lacks all that is necessary to make it efficient..".

=== The Great War ===
Regimental camp flag

During the First World War, the regiment acted as a training unit providing 145 officers and 5,207 other ranks for service in the numbered battalions of the C.E.F., especially the 16th, 19th, and the 173rd Highlanders. The latter was broken up for reinforcements, much to the chagrin of its men. Although the Argylls perpetuate both the 19th and the 173rd, it is the former which provides the regiment its most intimate connection with the Great War. The 91st gave the 19th all four of its commanding officers and its Pipe Major, Charles Davidson Dunbar, DCM, a Pipe Major of international renown.

As part of the 4th Infantry Brigade, 2nd Division, the 19th went from the mud and misery of Salisbury Plain, England, to the mud and blood of Flanders. The battalion saw its first action at Saint-Eloi in April 1916 and went on to serve on the Somme, at Courcelette, Vimy Ridge, Hill 70, Passchendaele, Drocourt-Quéant, and the Pursuit to Mons. In December 1918, its pipe Band played a victorious Canadian Corps across the Rhine and into Germany. The 19th has no official history published, however in 2016, a detailed history was published in the book “It Can't Last Forever – The 19th Battalion and the Canadian Corps in the First World War”, by David Campbell.

The 19th Battalion (Central Ontario), CEF was authorized on 7 November 1914 and embarked for Great Britain on 13 May 1915. It disembarked in France on 15 September 1915, where it fought as part of the 4th Infantry Brigade, 2nd Canadian Division in France and Flanders until the end of the war and disbanded on 15 September 1920.

The 173rd Battalion (Canadian Highlanders), CEF was authorized on 15 July 1916 and embarked for Great Britain on 14 November 1916. It provided reinforcements for the Canadian Corps until 4 January 1917, when its personnel were absorbed by the 2nd Reserve Battalion, CEF. The battalion disbanded on 1 September 1917. The 173rd Battalion was awarded the battle honour THE GREAT WAR 1916-17.

The 3rd Battalion, CMGC, CEF, was formed in France on 23 March 1918 from the machine gun companies of the 3rd Canadian Division, the 7th Machine Gun Company, 8th Machine Gun Company, 9th Machine Gun Company and later the 15th Machine Gun Company. It provided machine gun support to the 3rd Canadian Division in France and Flanders until the end of the war and disbanded on 15 November 1920.

=== Victoria Cross recipient ===
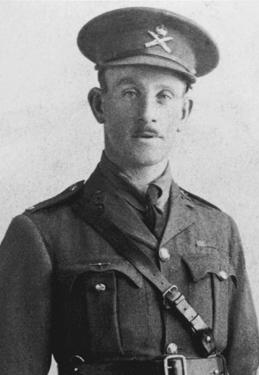
Lt. Hugh McKenzie, VC, DCM, C de G, CMGC.

Lt. Hugh McKenzie, who had risen from Private to Company Sergeant-Major in Princess Patricia's Canadian Light Infantry before accepting his commission and transferring to the Canadian Machine Gun Corps, was awarded the Victoria Cross posthumously for his actions during Passchendaele. He had already won the Empire's second-highest award for gallantry, the Distinguished Conduct Medal as well as the French Croix de Guerre with the PPCLI. On 30 October 1917, he was a member of the 7th Canadian Machine Gun Company, Canadian Machine Gun Corps, leading a section of four machine guns. Seeing that one of the PPCLI companies was hesitating to advance in the face of a German machine gun position on dominating ground, he handed command of his troops to an NCO and went to rally the men of his old regiment. Lt. McKenzie organized an attack and captured the enemy position. Once on the position, however, he realized that it was itself under dominating enemy machine gun fire from a nearby pillbox. Lt. McKenzie organized parties to capture the pillbox by making both frontal and flanking attacks. He was killed while leading the frontal attack. When the awarding of his Victoria Cross was announced in the London Gazette on 12 February 1918, his surname was misspelled as "Mackenzie."

=== Inter-war years ===
The regiment went through the inter-war years, endured the general militia reorganizations, and prospered. Not only was it large in numbers, (rarely below 400, at times exceeding 600) it benefited from a considerable cadre of First War veterans of all ranks. Tradition continued to play a pre-eminent role and the regiment enjoyed a visible civic profile through weekly parades on the streets, a close attachment to the city's elite, and the activities of three highly active bands (pipe — still under Dunbar, brass, and bugle).

=== The Second World War ===
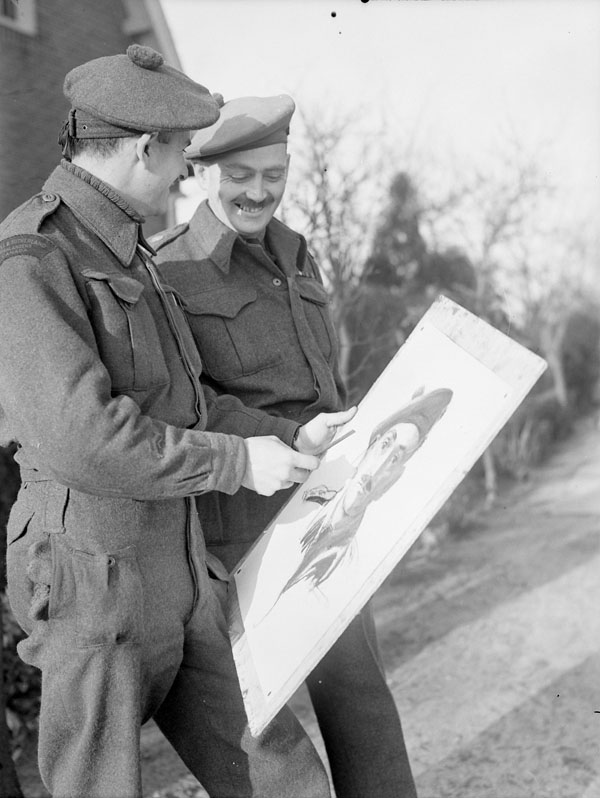
Private F.T.V. Savard shows Lieutenant-Colonel J.D. Stewart, commanding officer of the 1st Battalion, a portrait of Colonel Stewart which he is painting, Elshout, Netherlands, 17 December 1944.

Details from the regiment were called out on service before the actual start of the war on 26 August 1939 and placed on active service on 1 September 1939 as The Argyll and Sutherland Highlanders (Princess Louise's) (Machine Gun), CASF (Details), for local protection duties.

The details were formed as a battalion and designated The Argyll and Sutherland Highlanders (Princess Louise's), CASF on 15 August 1940. It was redesignated the 1st Battalion, The Argyll and Sutherland Highlanders (Princess Louise's) (Machine Gun), CASF on 7 November 1940 and then the 1st Battalion, The Argyll and Sutherland Highlanders (Princess Louise's), CASF on 1 February 1941. It served in Jamaica on garrison duty from 10 September 1941 to 20 May 1943, and embarked for Great Britain on 21 July 1943. On 26 July 1944, it landed in France as part of the 10th Canadian Infantry Brigade, 4th Canadian Armoured Division, and it continued to fight in North West Europe until the end of the war. The overseas battalion was disbanded on 15 February 1946.

The Argylls mobilized a battalion for the Canadian Active Service Force in June 1940. Prior to this, there were occasional call outs. Beginning in August 1939, Argylls performed guard duty on the local canal and electrical facility, for example. The problems of active duty were myriad. First World War pattern tunics and the kilt were issued until modern Battle Dress was issued, Ross rifles were the only weapons, and hollow pipes and bricks comprised heavy weapons for the mortar platoon.

Niagara

The first months of the war were spent in and around Niagara-on-the-Lake, a dreary round of guard duty on the Welland Canal and local power facilities. There was little training and almost no new equipment. The first Bren light machine guns, for example, arrived in December 1940. But there was time for setting the foundations for excellent administration and for addressing the usual range of problems associated with turning civilians into soldiers. It was during this period that the notorious "Mad Five" went AWOL, made their way to the Sunnyside Amusement Park in Toronto and telegraphed the CO – "Having a great time. Wish you were here." In May 1941 the 1st Battalion entrained for Nanaimo, BC, where it underwent several tedious months of route marches alternating with inspections.

Jamaica

September 1941 to May 1943 brought a sojourn in the sun – garrison duty in Jamaica. During this period, the reality of war was brought home by the fate of the Winnipeg Grenadiers (which unit the Argylls replaced in Jamaica) in Hong Kong, and of the Royal Hamilton Light Infantry (a sister unit from Hamilton) at Dieppe. Under the command of Lieutenant-Colonel Ian Sinclair, the unit received new weapons and modern equipment, improved its administration, and began a complete program of small unit tactics, fitness, and training.

England

The men of the 1st Battalion returned to Hamilton in May 1943. In preparation for overseas service, it received a new CO and senior officers, and many warrant officers and NCOs were also replaced. A notable exception was the Regimental Sergeant Major, Peter Caithness McGinlay. By August 1943 the unit had moved to England and joined the l0th Brigade of the 4th Canadian (Armoured) Division. Acting Sergeant John Rennie won a posthumous George Cross in October 1943, dying while shielding others from an exploding grenade during training. Collective training, specialized courses for individuals, and schemes at battalion, brigade and divisional level occupied the unit, now under the command of Lieutenant-Colonel J. David Stewart for whom the Argylls' reported a genuine affection. In action, he was described as having an intuitive sense of battle (which could not be taught), cool imperturbability, and a refusal to fight according to preconceived notions.

Normandy

The unit's first battles in early August 1944 were small successes fought along the road to Falaise. The first major action, Hill 195 on 10 August, was an unorthodox success; Stewart led the battalion single file through the darkness of night and German lines to capture this hitherto unassailable strong point. It was an act which historian John A. English has called "the single most impressive action of Operation Totalize." Less than ten days later in the Falaise Gap, a battle group of "B" and "C" companies of the Argylls, and a squadron of South Alberta Regiment tanks captured St Lambert-sur-Dives and held it for three days against desperate counter-attacks. The action resulted in Major David Vivian Currie of the South Albertas being awarded the Victoria Cross.

Of the experience of battle, Cpl H. E. Carter wrote to his mother on 13 August:

"That life in the front is not fun, not glamorous — it's dirty, and fierce and anyone that says they're not scared is crazy. But I'm not going to talk much about that. We try and keep our spirits up, joke and enjoy yourself under fire and we do an exceptionally good job of it." That very same day Capt Mac Smith put it best when he wrote to his wife: "The men are simply wonderful. They have done well, and are getting better. They grumble . . . and dig, and advance and dig, and advance. They stand shelling mortaring and occasional bombing, and then stand up in their trenches and ask where the hell the food is."

The Scheldt

The Rhineland

Closing Phases

Friesoythe

Canadian Army Historian C.P. Stacey commented that the only time he saw what could be considered a war crime committed by Canadian soldiers was after the very popular Commanding Officer of the Argylls, Lieutenant-Colonel F.E. Wigle, was shot dead during the battle of Friesoythe on 14 April 1945, allegedly by a German civilian. Col. Wigle was in fact killed by a German paratrooper at his tactical headquarters located south of Friesoythe.

"Apparently a rumour was going round that Colonel Wigle had been killed by a civilian sniper; as a result a great part of the town of Friesoythe was set on fire in a mistaken reprisal. This unfortunate episode only came to my notice and thus got into the pages of history because I was in Friesoythe at the time and saw people being turned out of their houses and the houses burned. How painfully easy it is for the business of "reprisals" to get out of hand!"

As a result, Friesoythe was almost totally destroyed or, as G.L. Cassidy put it, "The raging Highlanders cleared the remainder of that town as no town has been cleared for centuries, we venture to say." One German source estimates that 300 of 355 houses were totally destroyed, for a percentage rate of 84.5. Another source, the Brockhaus Enzyklopaedie, estimated the destruction as high as 90%. The incident is also recounted in Tony Foster's Meeting of Generals.

Overall

Through Moerbrugge, the Scheldt, Kapelsche Veer, the Hochwald Gap, Friesoythe, the Küsten Canal, and Bad Zwischenahn, the Argylls engaged the enemy. Their casualties (267 killed and 808 wounded) were the lowest in the 10th Brigade. Despite repeated turnovers in the rifle companies, the unit maintained its composition and performance during ten months of battle. Capt. Claude Bissell noted that these factors made them "a happy regiment and a formidable one in action."

The 1st Battalion provided the headquarters and one rifle company for the Canadian Berlin Battalion, a composite battalion which represented the Canadian Armed Forces in the British victory celebrations in Berlin in July 1945. The battalion returned to Hamilton in January 1946 where it was dismissed.

=== Post-war ===
The regiment now reverted to its traditional peacetime role with the primary reserves. By the early 1960s the reservoir of veterans had dried up. Numbers shrunk with the various changes in defence policy and equipment became outdated. By the 1980s military policies reversed once more, and the emphasis in national defence shifted back to a focus on war fighting as opposed to civil defence. The 1990s saw the introduction of the Total Force concept in which the Militia was considered an equal partner with the Regular Force in meeting the commitments of the Canadian Forces. While retaining its Highland traditions, and Argylls serve Canadians whether combating natural disasters at home (66 deployed during the 1998 ice storm and many volunteered during the Red River flood) or augmenting UN or NATO deployments abroad. Since the 1950s, Argylls have been deployed on active service augmenting Canada's regular forces in places such as Norway, Cyprus, Germany, Namibia, Golan Heights, Bosnia, Kosovo, and Afghanistan.

=== War in Afghanistan ===
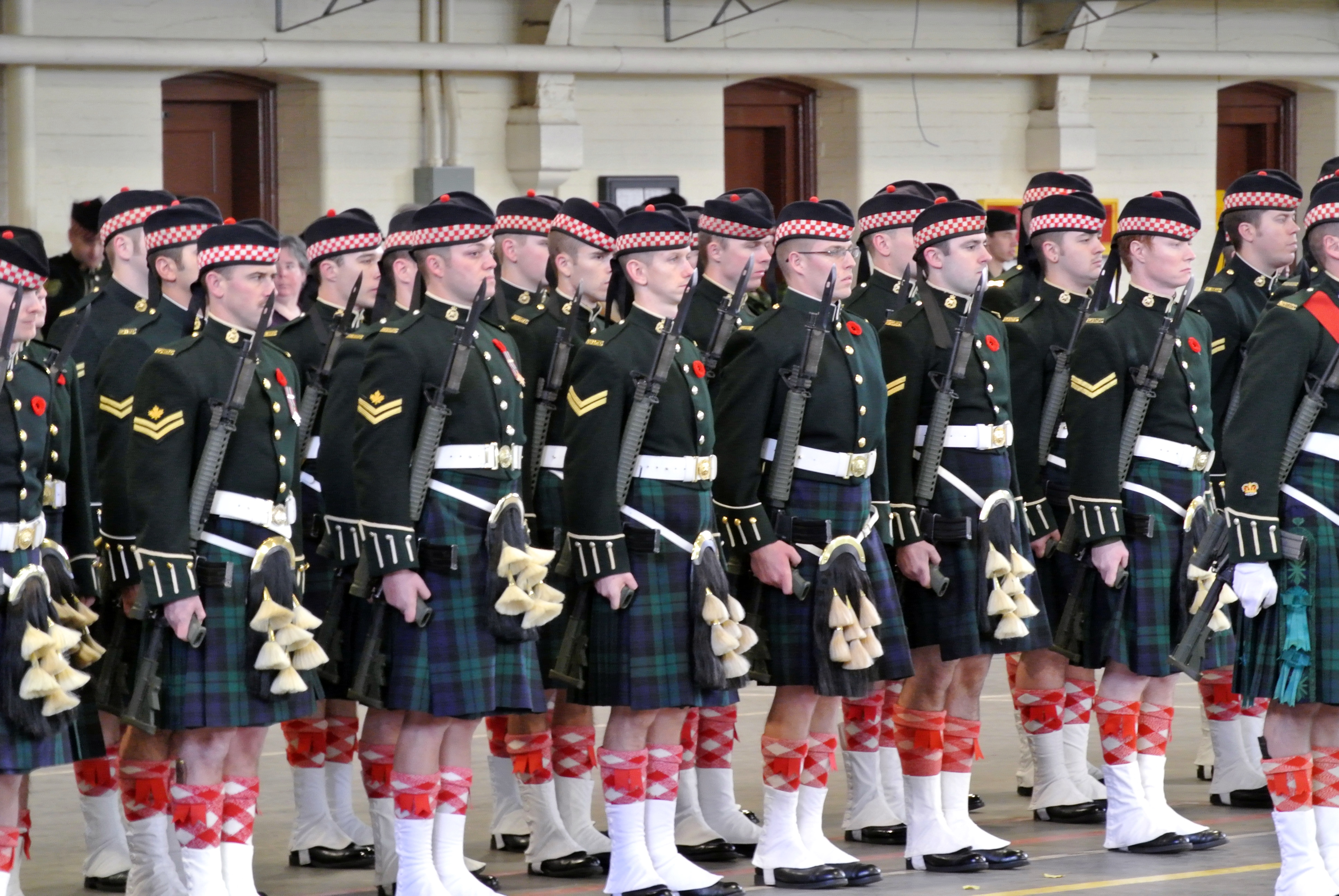
Members in ceremonial dress No. 1 during the 2013 Veterans Parade.

The regiment contributed an aggregate of more than 20% of its authorized strength to the various Task Forces which served in Afghanistan between 2002 and 2014.

=== Community ===
A strong tradition of reciprocal local support (from 1902 to the present) is exemplified in the 91st Highlanders Athletic Association (which runs the oldest indoor track meet in North America) and the annual Greater Hamilton Tattoo.

Community support has been symbolic, material, and artistic. In 1972, Hamilton granted the Argylls the freedom of the city. The Ontario government has erected heritage plaques to two Argylls (Pipe-Officer Charles Davidson Dunbar, D.C.M. and Acting Sergeant John Rennie, G.C. 1919–1943) on the Armouries' outer walls (the only regiment in the Hamilton-Wentworth, Niagara, Toronto area to be so distinguished). Retired Colours hang in three Hamilton churches and there is a continuing affiliation with Central Presbyterian Church. The local business community contributed generously to the Argyll Regimental Foundation. Local, provincial, and national funds underwrote the project (1984–91) and publication (1996) of Black Yesterdays: The Argylls' War, a pictorial history of the regiment in the Second World War.

=== National War Memorial terrorist attack ===
On 22 October 2014, Corporal Nathan Cirillo of the Argylls was murdered while standing ceremonial guard duty at the National War Memorial (Canada) in Ottawa, Ontario. He was approached from behind and shot several times in the back by an Islamic extremist. The shooter also fired shots at another guard, before traveling to the Parliament Buildings where he was shot dead.

== Pipes and Drums ==
The regimental Pipes and Drums band has represented the unit at gatherings across the country and internationally, for example the Royal Edinburgh Military Tattoo (five appearances since 1950, the most recent of which was in August 2012) and various events in Europe.

A 3/4 retreat march bagpipe tune "Lament for the Argylls" was composed by Major Archie Cairns in honour of the Argyll and Sutherland Highlanders of Canada (Princess Louise's). Major Cairns was Pipe Major of the regimental band during the 1950s and was son of Pipe Major John Knox Cairns, who served with the 19th Battalion (Central Ontario), CEF, as a piper during the First World War.

=== Pipe Majors ===
- Pipe Major W.G. Munro, 1903
- Pipe Major A.M. MacGregor, 1903–1913
- Pipe Major Charles Davidson Dunbar, DCM, 1913–1914
- Pipe Major J. McMurrich, c.1914-c.1917
- Pipe Officer (Lieut) Charles Davidson Dunbar, DCM, 1917–1937
- Pipe Major A. McKenzie, c.1922
- Pipe Major S. Featherstone, 1923–1940
- Pipe Major J.K. Cairns, 1946–1949
- Pipe Major J. Wilson, 1949–1952
- Pipe Major A. Cairns, 1952–1954
- Pipe Major C. Wright, 1954–1956
- Pipe Major A. Craig, CD, 1957–1963
- Pipe Major W. Day, CD, 1963–1965
- Pipe Major G. Henderson, CD, 1965–1973
- Pipe Major J. Terence, MMM, CD, 1973–2000
- Pipe Major T.G. Lee, CD, 2000–2010
- Pipe Major S.H. Balinson, CD, 2010–2024
- Pipe Major J.J.A. Kersell, CD, 2024–Present

=== 1st Battalion (1940–1946) ===
- Pipe Sergeant P.C. McGinlay, 1940
- Pipe Sergeant F. Noble, 1940
- Pipe Major F. Noble, 1940–1946

=== 2nd Battalion (1940–1946) ===
- Pipe Major S. Featherstone, 1940–1946

=== Drum Majors ===
- Drum Major C. Stewart, CD, 1964-1973
- Drum Major R. DiCiacca, CD, 1974-2000
- Drum Major B. Jaeckle, CD, 2000-2018
- Drum Major K.W. Wilson, CD, 2018-Present

=== Directors of Music and Band Masters ===
- Captain H. Stares, 1903-1939
- Band Master(WOII) H. Cummings, c.1939
- Band Master R. Whetstone, unknown dates
- Band Master(2Lt) H. Leroy, unknown dates

=== Bugle Majors ===
- BMaj A.G. Andrews, c.1911
- BMaj J. Moore, c.1928
- BMaj J. Lougheed, c.1940

=== 19th Battalion, CEF (1914–1919) ===
- Pipe Sergeant A. McKenzie, 1914-1915
- Pipe Major C.D. Dunbar, DCM, 1915–1916
- Pipe Sergeant A. McKenzie, 1916-1918

=== 173rd Battalion, CEF (1916-1917) ===
- Pipe Major A.T. Pollock, 1916-1917
- Band Master F. McCallum, c.1916-c.1917

== Regimental tartan ==
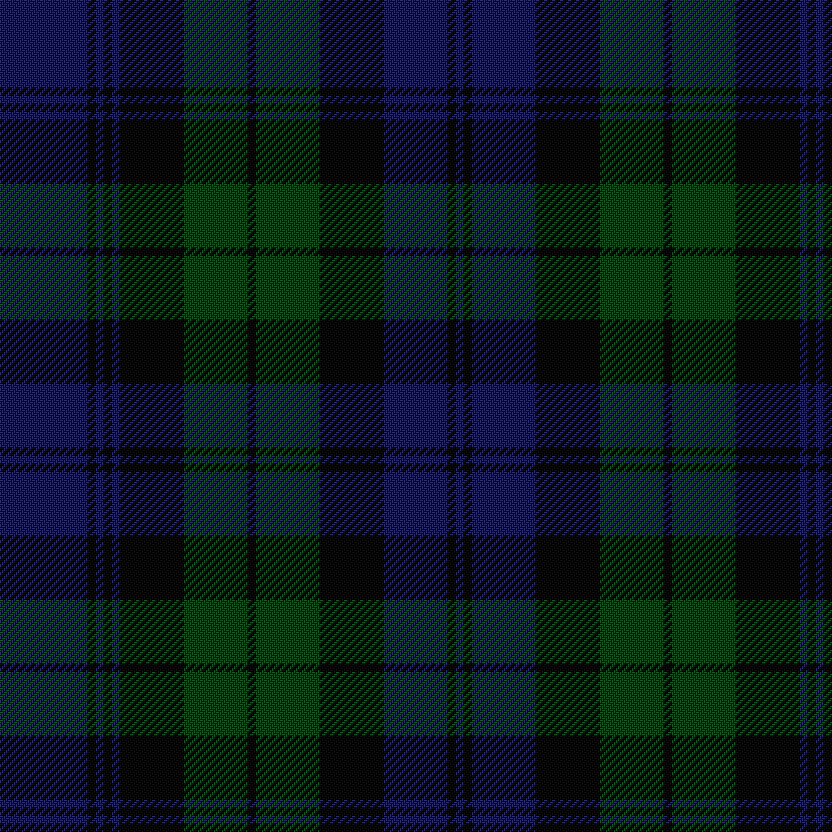
The Black Watch tartan, also known as "Government No. 1", or the Campbell tartan. The regiment wears Government No. 1a, which is very similar to the Black Watch tartan used by several military units throughout the Commonwealth.

The kilt worn by the Argyll and Sutherland Highlanders are traditionally box pleated while those of The Black Watch (Royal Highland Regiment), who wear Government No. 1 Tartan, are knife pleated.

== Headdress ==
The Glengarry worn by the Argylls is unique in having red and white dicing; other Scottish and Highland units generally have a black square alternating with red in the centre row. This pattern of dicing was worn by the 93rd Sutherland Highlanders on Kilmarnock bonnets and balmorals from their inception in 1803 to their amalgamation with the Argyllshire Highlanders in 1881, and on glengarries by the Imperial Argyll and Sutherland Highlanders from 1881 to 2006. Affiliate regiments in the Commonwealth also wear this unique pattern of glengarry, including the Calgary Highlanders. Regimental pipers in all Argyll-affiliated units wear plain black glengarries without dicing.

== Lineage ==
=== The Argyll and Sutherland Highlanders of Canada (Princess Louise's) ===
- Originated 1 September 1903 as the 91st "Highlanders"
- Redesignated 2 July 1904 as the 91st Regiment Canadian Highlanders'
- Redesignated 1 May 1920 as The Argyll and Sutherland Highlanders of Canada'
- Redesignated 15 October 1920 as the Princess Louise's (Argyll and Sutherland Highlanders) of Canada
- Redesignated 15 June 1927 as The Argyll and Sutherland Highlanders of Canada (Princess Louise's)
- Amalgamated 15 December 1936 with the 3rd Machine Gun Battalion, CMGC (less 'C Company') and redesignated as The Argyll and Sutherland Highlanders of Canada (Princess Louise's) (Machine Gun)
- Redesignated 7 November 1940 as the 2nd (Reserve) Battalion, The Argyll and Sutherland Highlanders of Canada (Princess Louise's)
- Redesignated 1 February 1941 as the 2nd (Reserve) Battalion, The Argyll and Sutherland Highlanders of Canada (Princess Louise's)
- Redesignated 15 February 1946 as The Argyll and Sutherland Highlanders of Canada (Princess Louise's)

=== 3rd Machine Gun Battalion, CMGC ===
- Originated 1 June 1919 as the 3rd Machine Gun Brigade, CMGC
- Redesignated 15 September 1924 as the 3rd Machine Gun Battalion, CMGC
- Amalgamated 15 December 1936 (less C Company) with The Argyll and Sutherland Highlanders of Canada (Princess Louise's)

=== Chart ===
Lineage chart

1903	91st "Highlanders"
1904	91st Regt Canadian Highlanders
1914	19th Bn, CEF	173rd "Overseas" Bn, CEF
1917	Absorbed by 2nd Reserve Bn
1918	3rd Bn, CMGC, CEF
1919	3rd MG Bde, CMGC
1920	Disbanded	Disbanded
1920	1st Bn (91st Bn, CEF), The Argyll and Sutherland Highlanders of Canada	2nd Bn (19th Bn, CEF), (Note: Reserve) The Argyll and Sutherland Highlanders of Canada	3rd Bn (173rd Bn, CEF), The Argyll and Sutherland Highlanders of Canada
1920	1st Bn (91st Bn, CEF), Princess Louise's (Argyll and Sutherland Highlanders) of Canada	2nd Bn (19th Bn, CEF), Princess Louise's (Argyll and Sutherland Highlanders) of Canada	3rd Bn (173rd Bn, CEF), Princess Louise's (Argyll and Sutherland Highlanders) of Canada
1924	3rd MG Bn, CMGC
1927	1st Bn (91st Bn, CEF), The Argyll and Sutherland Highlanders of Canada (Princess Louise's)	2nd Bn (19th Bn, CEF), The Argyll and Sutherland Highlanders of Canada (Princess Louise's)	3rd Bn (173rd Bn, CEF), The Argyll and Sutherland Highlanders of Canada (Princess Louise's)
1936	Disbanded	Disbanded
1936	The Argyll and Sutherland Highlanders of Canada (Princess Louise's) (MG)
1940	The Argyll and Sutherland Highlanders (Princess Louise's), CASF
1940	1st Bn, The Argyll and Sutherland Highlanders (Princess Louise's) (MG), CASF	2nd (Reserve) Bn, The Argyll and Sutherland Highlanders of Canada (Princess Louise's) (MG)
1941	1st Bn, The Argyll and Sutherland Highlanders (Princess Louise's), CASF	2nd (Reserve) Bn, The Argyll and Sutherland Highlanders of Canada (Princess Louise's)
1946	Disbanded	The Argyll and Sutherland Highlanders of Canada (Princess Louise's)

== Perpetuations ==
=== The Great War ===
- 19th Battalion (Central Ontario), CEF
- 173rd Battalion (Canadian Highlanders), CEF
- 3rd Battalion, Canadian Machine Gun Corps, CEF

== Battle honours ==
Battle honours on the regimental colour

Battle honours in small capitals are for large operations and campaigns and those in lowercase are for more specific battles. Bold type indicates honours emblazoned on the regimental colour.

First World War
- Mount Sorrel
- **Somme, 1916, '18**
- Flers–Courcelette
- Thiepval
- Ancre Heights
- **Arras, 1917, '18**
- **Vimy, 1917**
- Hill 70
- **Ypres, 1917**
- **Passchendaele**
- **Amiens**
- Scarpe, 1918
- **Drocourt–Quéant**
- **Hindenburg Line**
- Canal du Nord
- Cambrai, 1918
- **Pursuit to Mons**
- **France and Flanders, 1915–18**
Second World War
- **Falaise**
- Falaise Road
- St. Lambert-sur-Dives
- **The Seine, 1944**
- **Moerbrugge**
- **The Scheldt**
- Breskens Pocket
- **The Lower Maas**
- Kapelsche Veer
- **The Rhineland**
- **The Hochwald**
- Veen
- **Friesoythe**
- **Küsten Canal**
- Bad Zwischenahn
- **North-West Europe, 1944–1945**
South-West Asia
Afghanistan

== Regimental colours ==
Regimental colour

Camp flag

The regimental stand of colours includes both the sovereign's (King's Colour), the senior colour, and the Regimental Colour. The King's Colour is based on the National Flag (Maple Leaf), with a crimson circle inscribed with 'The Argyll and Sutherland Highlanders of Canada (Princess Louise's)' surmounted by a crown emblazoned in the centre. The Regimental Colour is in the regiment's facing colour, yellow, and bears a crimson circle inscribed with 'The Argyll and Sutherland Highlanders of Canada (Princess Louise's)' surmounted by a crown in the middle. Centred on the crimson circle is a leopard's head, the central device from the regimental cap badge. A wreath of maple leaves and thistles and the regimental motto ring the central design, and encircling the wreath are the 20 battle honours of the regiment selected for emblazonment. In each corner is the personal cypher of Princess Louise, Duchess of Argyll, or of Queen Elizabeth II.

== Legacy ==
Stanley Thomas John Fryer (1885–1956), designed the memorial to the Men of the 91st Regiment, Canadian Highlanders, at the Hamilton Armouries, James Street North in 1921.

== Armoury ==
Site	Date(s)	Designated	Location	Description	Image
John Weir Foote Armoury 200 James Street North	1888–1908	1989 National Historic Sites of Canada; 1991 Classified on the Register of the Government of Canada Heritage Buildings	Hamilton; 43°15′42.76″N 79°51′58.42″W	Named after John Weir Foote, one large complex is composed of two armouries. The north section of the building is representative of the second evolutionary stage in drill hall construction in Canada (in the 1870s to 1890s); Houses Argyll and Sutherland Highlanders of Canada (Princess Louise's); 11th Field Regiment, Royal Hamilton Light Infantry, 31 Service Battalion, 31 Signals Regiment.	Exterior view of the John Weir Foote Armoury

== Alliances ==
- United Kingdom – The Argyll and Sutherland Highlanders (5 SCOTS)
- Australia – The Royal New South Wales Regiment
- Pakistan – 1st Battalion (Scinde), The Frontier Force Regiment

== Order of precedence ==
Preceded by The Algonquin Regiment (Northern Pioneers)	The Argyll and Sutherland Highlanders of Canada (Princess Louise's)	Succeeded by The Lake Superior Scottish Regiment

== See also ==
- Canadian-Scottish regiment
