= Japan National Route 174 =

National highway in Japan

National Route 174
- 国道174号
- Japan National Route 174 highlighted in red

Route information
- Length: 0.187 km (0.116 mi; 610 ft)
- Existed: 1953–present

Major junctions
- South end: Port of Kobe
- North end: National Route 2 in Chūō-ku, Kobe

Location
- Country: Japan

Highway system
- National highways of Japan; Expressways of Japan
← National Route 173	→ National Route 175

National Route 174 (国道174号, Kokudō Hyakunanajūyon-gō) is a national highway connecting the Port of Kobe and National Route 2 in Kobe, Japan. It is the shortest national highway in Japan.

== Route description ==
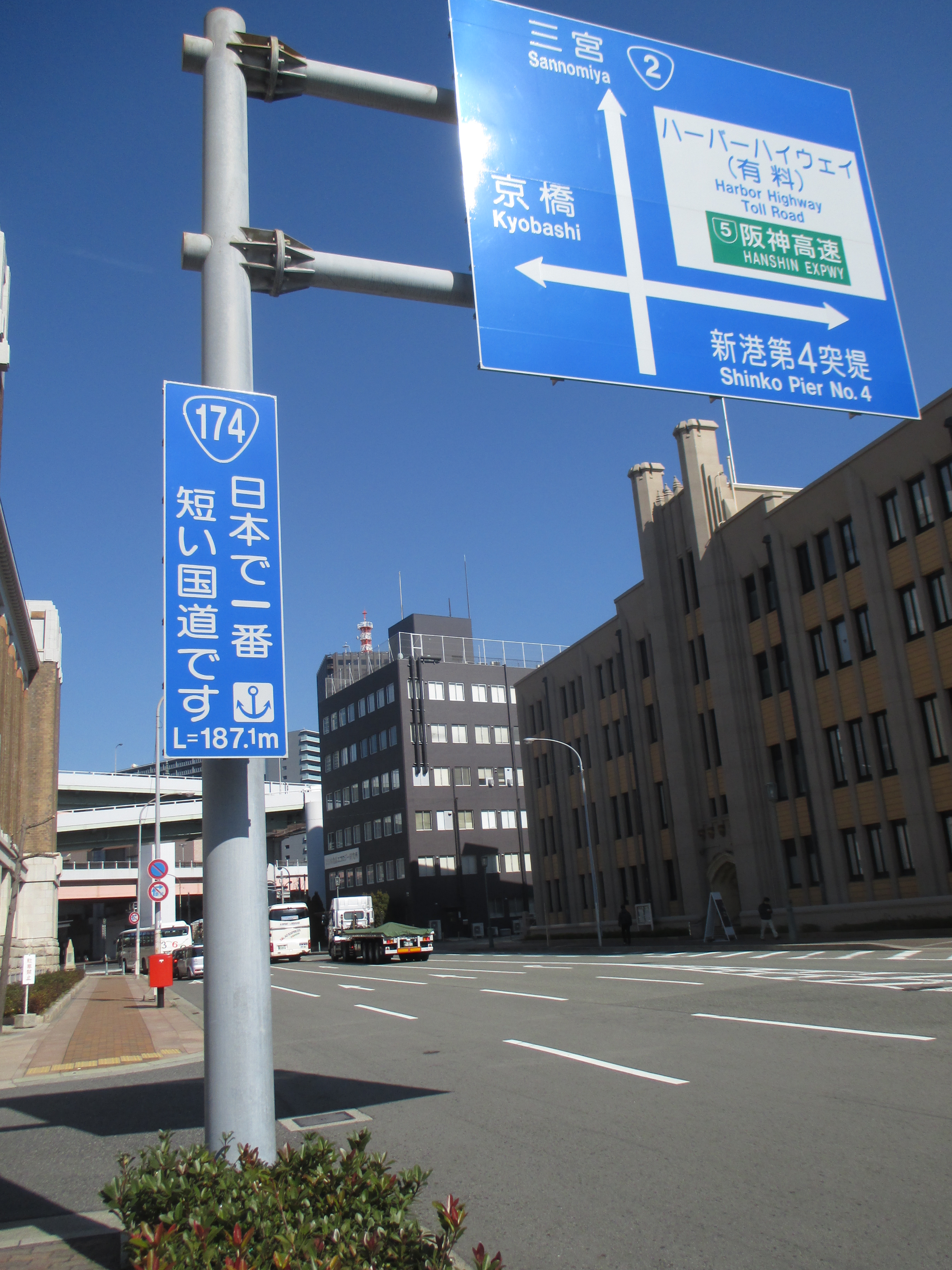
The starting point of the highway.

National Route 174 measures just 187 meters (614 ft) from its southern terminus at the Port of Kobe to its northern terminus, a junction with National Route 2 in Chūō-ku, Kobe. This brief routing makes it the shortest out of all of Japan's national highways.

== History ==
On 18 May 1953, the road was established by the Cabinet of Japan as Second Class National Highway 174 between the Port of Kobe to its intersection with National Route 2. That route was upgraded on 1 April 1965 to the current General National Highway 174.

== Junction list ==
The entire highway is in Hyōgo Prefecture.

Location	km	mi	Destinations	Notes
Chūō-ku, Kobe	0.0	0.0	Shinko Harbor Road– Shinko Higashi Wharf, Shinko Piers 1 and 2, Port Island, Hanshin Expressway	Southern terminus
Chūō-ku, Kobe	0.088	0.055	Kyōbashi	
Chūō-ku, Kobe	0.187	0.116	National Route 2 – Akashi, Kōbe Station, Osaka, Ashiya; Hyōgo Prefecture Route 30 – Sannomiya, Shin-Kobe Station	Northern terminus; roadway continues as Hyōgo Prefecture Route 30
1.000 mi = 1.609 km; 1.000 km = 0.621 mi
