= Japan National Route 172 =

National highway in Japan

National Route 172
- 国道172号

Route information
- Length: 8.0 km (5.0 mi)
- Existed: 18 May 1953–present

Major junctions
- West end: Port of Osaka, Minato-ku, Osaka
- East end: National Route 25 in Chūō-ku, Osaka

Location
- Country: Japan

Highway system
- National highways of Japan; Expressways of Japan
← National Route 171	→ National Route 173

National Route 172 is a national highway of Japan connecting Minato-ku, Osaka and Chūō-ku, Osaka in Japan, with a total length of 8 km (4.97 mi).
