= Japan National Route 173 =

National highway in Japan

National Route 173
- 国道173号
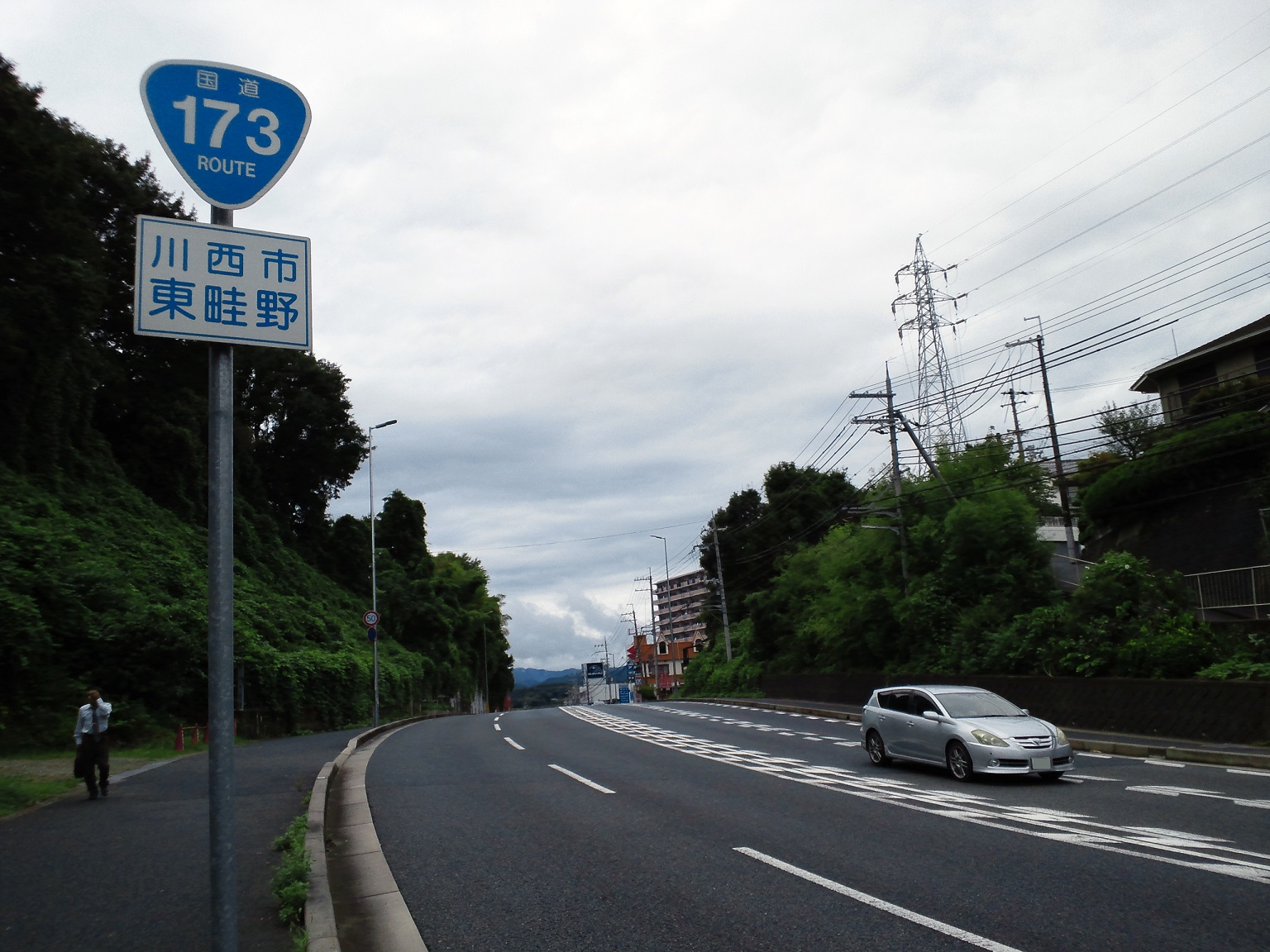

Route information
- Length: 72.4 km (45.0 mi)
- Existed: 1963–present

Location
- Country: Japan

Highway system
- National highways of Japan; Expressways of Japan
| ← National Route 172 | → National Route 174 |

National Route 173 is a national highway of Japan connecting Ikeda, Osaka and Ayabe, Kyoto in Japan, with a total length of 72.4 km (44.99 mi).

== History ==
Route 173 originally ran from Osaka to Kobe. This was redesignated as Route 43 in 1958. The current Route 173 was designated in 1963 from Ikeda to Mizhuo, replacing a section of Route 9 when it was rerouted. On 1 April 1975 Route 173 was extended over a section of Route 43 to Ayabe.
