= R172 road (Ireland) =

Road in Ireland

R172 road
- Bóthar R172

Location
- Country: Ireland

Highway system
- Roads in Ireland; Motorways; Primary; Secondary; Regional

The R172 road is a regional road in Ireland linking Blackrock and Dundalk in County Louth.

== See also ==
- Roads in Ireland
- National primary road
- National secondary road
