= 213th Battalion (American Legion), CEF =

The 213th Battalion, CEF was a unit in the Canadian Expeditionary Force during World War I. Based in Toronto, Ontario, the unit began recruiting in early 1916 throughout Military Districts 1, 2, 3, 4, 5, and 6. After sailing to England in January 1917, the battalion was absorbed into the 4th Reserve Battalion. The 213th Battalion, CEF had one Officer Commanding: Lieutenant-Colonel B. J. McCormick.
