= 173rd Ohio Infantry Regiment =

- Active: September 18, 1864, to July 5, 1865
- Country: United States
- Allegiance: Union
- Branch: Infantry
- Engagements: Battle of Nashville

The 173rd Ohio Infantry Regiment, sometimes 173rd Ohio Volunteer Infantry (or 173rd OVI) was an infantry regiment in the Union Army during the American Civil War.

== Service ==
The 173rd Ohio Infantry was organized in Gallipolis, Ohio, and mustered in for one year service on September 18, 1864, under the command of Colonel John R. Hurd.

The regiment was attached to Post and Defenses of Nashville, Tennessee, Department of the Cumberland, to March 1865. 3rd Sub-District, District of Middle Tennessee, Department of the Cumberland, to June 1865.

The 173rd Ohio Infantry mustered out of service July 12, 1865, at Nashville, Tennessee, and was discharged at Camp Dennison near Cincinnati, Ohio, on July 5, 1865.

== Detailed service ==
Left Ohio for Nashville, Tenn., September 18, arriving there October 1. Assigned to guard duty at Nashville, Tenn., until February 1865. Occupation of Nashville during Hood's investment December 1–15, 1864. Battle of Nashville December 15–16. Guarding prisoners at Nashville until February 1865. Moved to Columbia, Tenn., February 15. Duty there and at Johnsonville until June 20. Moved to Nashville June 20, and there mustered out June 26. Disbanded at Camp Dennison, Ohio, July 5, 1865.

== Casualties ==
The regiment lost a total of 108 enlisted men during service, all due to disease.

== Commanders ==
- Colonel John Ricker Hurd

== See also ==
- List of Ohio Civil War units
- Ohio in the Civil War
