= 173rd Division (People's Republic of China) =

173rd Division (1949-50)
- Active: 1949.2 - 1950.11
- Country: People's Republic of China
- Branch: People's Liberation Army
- Type: Division
- Role: Infantry
- Part of: 58th Corps
- Engagements: Chinese Civil War

The 173rd Division (Chinese: 第173师) was created in February 1949 under the Regulation of the Redesignations of All Organizations and Units of the Army, issued by Central Military Commission on November 1, 1948, basing on the 3rd Sub-district of Tongbai Military District. Its history could be traced to 5th Independent Brigade of Jinan Military District formed in August 1947.

The division was composed of 517th, 518th and 519th Infantry Regiments. As a part of 58th Corps, during the Chinese Civil War the division took part in the creation of Tongbai base area and Xiangfan Campaign.

In November 1950 the division was inactivated.

- Division Headquarters merged into Navy Command, Middle-South Military Region;
- 517th and 518th Infantry Regiments were transferred to Nanyang Military Sub-district;
- 519th Infantry Regiment was transferred to Shangqiu Military Sub-district.
