= 173rd New York Infantry Regiment =

- Active: September 22, 1862 – October 18, 1865
- Country: United States
- Allegiance: Union
- Branch: Infantry
- Engagements: Battle of Fort Bisland; Siege of Port Hudson; Red River Campaign; Battle of Sabine Cross Roads; Battle of Pleasant Hill; Battle of Monett's Ferry; Battle of Fort Stevens

The 173rd New York Infantry Regiment (a.k.a., "4th Metropolitan Guard" and "4th National Guard") was an infantry regiment in the Union Army during the American Civil War.

== Service ==
The 173rd New York Infantry was organized at Brooklyn, New York beginning September 22, 1862 and mustered in for three-years service November 10, 1862 under the command of Colonel Charles B. Morton.

The regiment was attached to Grover's Division, Department of the Gulf, to January 1863. 2nd Brigade, 3rd Division, XIX Corps, Department of the Gulf, to September 1863. 1st Brigade, 3rd Division, XIX Corps, to February 1864. 3rd Brigade, 1st Division, XIX Corps, Department of the Gulf, to July 1864, and Army of the Shenandoah, Middle Military Division, to February 1865. 3rd Brigade, 1st Provisional Division, Army of the Shenandoah, to April 1865. 3rd Brigade, Dwight's Division, Department of Washington, to June 1865. District of Savannah, Georgia, Department of the South, to October 1865.

The 173rd New York Infantry mustered out of service October 18, 1865.

== Detailed service ==
Left New York for New Orleans, Louisiana, December 9, 1862. Occupation of Baton Rouge, Louisiana, December 17, 1862, and duty there until March 1863. Operations on Bayou Plaquemine and the Black and Atchafalaya Rivers February 18–28. Operations against Port Hudson, Louisiana, March 7–27. Moved to Algiers April 3, thence to Brashear April 8. Operations in western Louisiana April 9 – May 14. Bayou Teche Campaign April 11–20. Fort Bisland, near Centreville, April 12–13. Expedition from St. Martinsville to Breaux Bridge April 17–21. Expedition from Opelousas to Chicotsville and Bayou Boeuf April 26–29. Expedition to Alexandria, on Red River, May 4–12. Marched to Port Hudson May 19–26. Siege of Port Hudson May 26 – July 9. Assaults on Port Hudson May 27 and June 14. Surrender of Port Hudson July 9. Moved to New Orleans July 15, and duty there until August 28. Sabine Pass Expedition September 4–11. Moved to Brashear City September 16, then to Berwick. Western Louisiana Campaign October 3-November 30. Vermillionville November 11. At New Iberia until January 7, 1864. Moved to Franklin January 7, and duty there until March. Red River Campaign March 10-May 22. Advance from Franklin to Alexandria, March 14–26. Battle of Sabine Cross Roads April 8. Pleasant Hill April 9. Monett's Bluff, Cane River Crossing, April 23. At Alexandria April 26 – May 13. Construction of dam at Alexandria April 30 – May 10. Retreat to Morganza, May 13–20. Mansura May 16. Duty at Morganza until July. Moved to Fort Monroe, Virginia, then to Washington, D.C., July 2–31. Sheridan's Shenandoah Valley Campaign August 7 – November 28. Served with the brigade, detached as supply train guard for the army, from August 14 to October 27. Duty near Middletown and Newtown until December, and at Stevenson's Depot and Winchester until April 1865. Moved to Washington, D.C., and duty there until June. Grand Review of the Armies May 23–24. Moved to Savannah, Georgia, June 30 – July 7. Duty there and in the Sub-District of Ogeechee, District of Savannah, until October.

== Casualties ==
The regiment lost a total of 175 men during service; 6 officers and 38 enlisted men killed or mortally wounded, two officers and 129 enlisted men died of disease.

== Commanders ==
- Colonel Charles B. Morton
- Colonel Lewis Mead Peck

== See also ==
- List of New York Civil War regiments
- New York in the Civil War
